= 2022 Bataan local elections =

Local elections in the Philippines

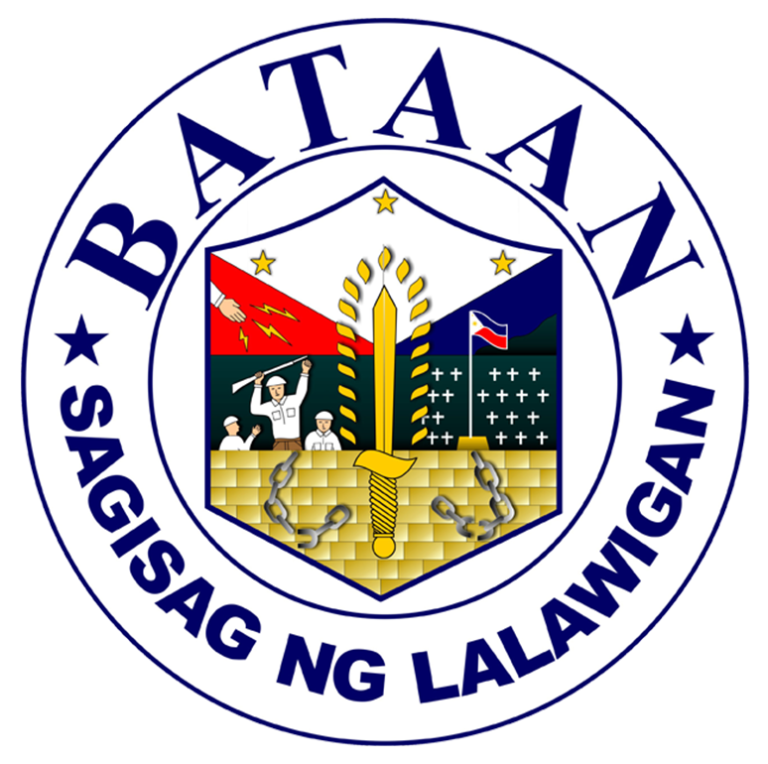
- May 9, 2022
- Registered: 566,479
- Turnout: 498,293
- 2022 Bataan gubernatorial election
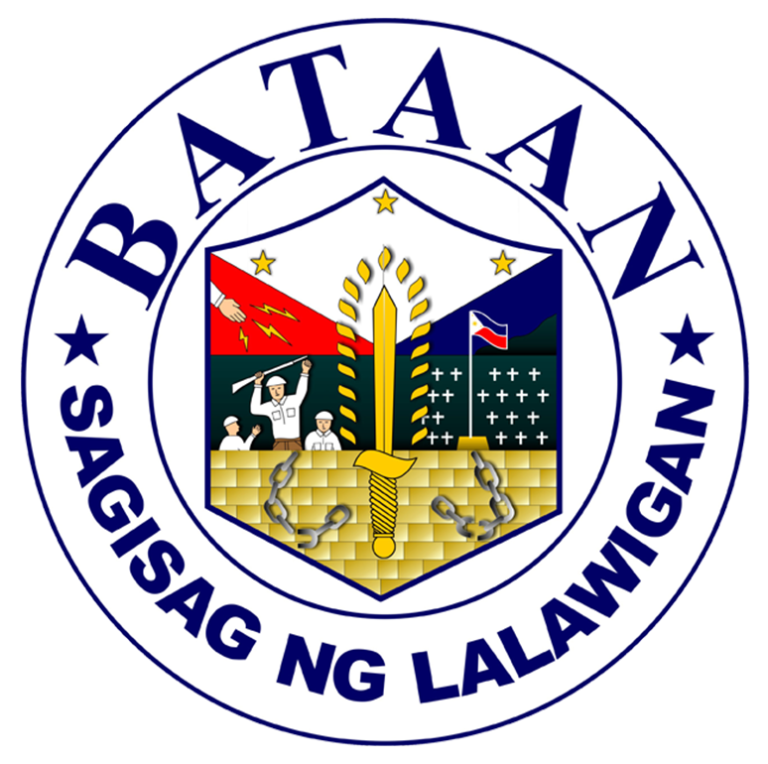
- May 9, 2022
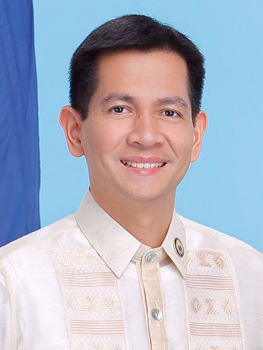
Candidate	Joet Garcia
Party	PDP–Laban
Running mate	Cris Garcia
Popular vote	376,924
Percentage	100%
Governor before election
Albert Garcia
NUP
Elected Governor
Joet Garcia
PDP–Laban
- 2022 Bataan vice gubernatorial election
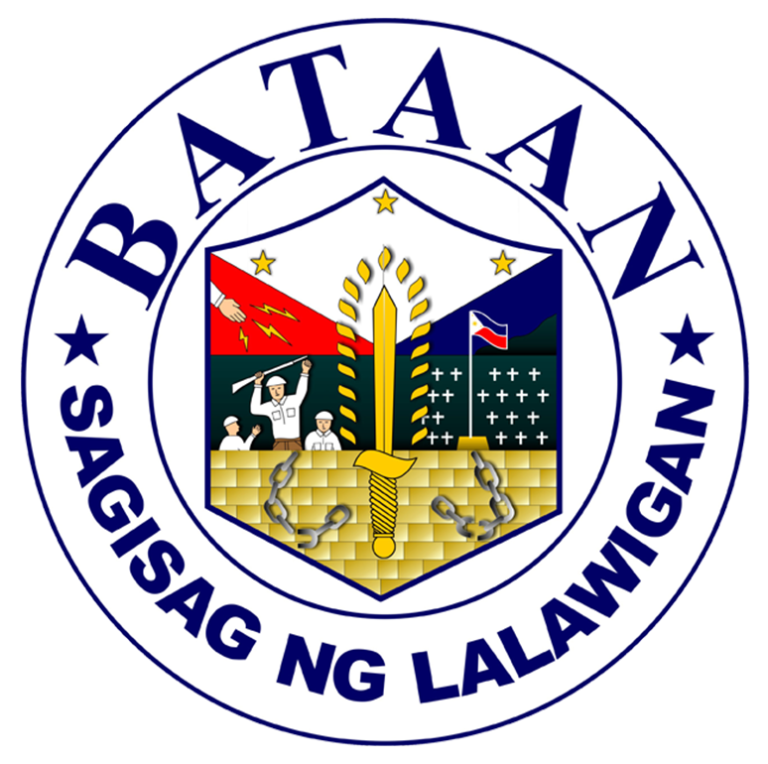
- May 9, 2022
	NUP	Ind	Ind
Candidate	Cris Garcia	Ronil Castro	Joemel Pugma
Party	NUP	Independent	Independent
Popular vote	340,594	34,625	15,435
Percentage	87.18%	7.34%	5.46%
Vice-Governor before election
Cris Garcia
NUP
Elected Vice-Governor
Cris Garcia
NUP

Local elections were held in Bataan on May 9, 2022, as part of the 2022 Philippine general election. Voters will select candidates for all local positions: a town mayor, vice mayor, and town councilors, as well as members of the Sangguniang Panlalawigan, a vice-governor, a governor, and representatives for the province's three congressional districts in the Philippine House of Representatives.

== Results ==
=== Governor ===
Bataan Gubernatorial Election
Party	Candidate	Votes	%
PDP–Laban	Joet Garcia	376,924	100
Total votes		376,924	100
PDP–Laban gain from NUP			

==== Per City/Municipality ====
City/Municipality	Jose Enrique Garcia III	
City/Municipality	Votes	%
Abucay	19,137	100.00
Bagac	15,396	100.00
Balanga	55,229	100.00
Dinalupihan	49,746	100.00
Hermosa	32,814	100.00
Limay	37,077	100.00
Mariveles	53,396	100.00
Morong	13,359	100.00
Orani	32,166	100.00
Orion	25,932	100.00
Pilar	21,041	100.00
Samal	21,631	100.00
TOTAL	376,924	100.00

=== Vice Governor ===
Bataan Vice Gubernatorial Election
Party	Candidate	Votes	%
NUP	Cris Garcia (Incumbent)	340,594	87.18
Independent	Ronil Castro	34,625	7.34
Independent	Joemel Pugma	15,435	5.46
Total votes		390,654	100
NUP hold			

==== Per City/Municipality ====
City/Municipality	Ma. Cristina Garcia		Ronil Castro		Joemel Pugma	
City/Municipality	Votes	%	Votes	%	Votes	%
Abucay	17,089	90.48	1,409	7.46	389	2.06
Bagac	14,200	87.96	1,295	8.02	649	4.02
Balanga	49,914	95.16	1,961	3.74	575	1.10
Dinalupihan	45,162	83.13	5,832	10.73	3,335	6.14
Hermosa	29,567	90.45	2,280	6.97	843	2.58
Limay	33,522	87.27	3,095	8.06	1,794	4.67
Mariveles	47,891	74.97	10,962	17.16	5,031	7.88
Morong	12,631	81.73	2,231	14.44	593	3.84
Orani	28,293	92.43	1,647	5.38	669	2.19
Orion	24,116	90.44	1,701	6.38	847	3.18
Pilar	18,859	93.43	983	4.87	344	1.70
Samal	19,350	92.38	1,229	5.87	366	1.75
TOTAL	340,594	87.18	34,625	7.34	15,435	5.46

=== Congressional Districts ===
==== 1st District ====
Philippine House of Representatives Election at Bataan's 1st District
Party	Candidate	Votes	%
Lakas	Geraldine Roman (Incumbent)	107,496	100
Total votes		107,496	100
Lakas gain from PDP–Laban			

==== 2nd District ====
Philippine House of Representatives Election at Bataan's 2nd District
Party	Candidate	Votes	%
NUP	Albert Garcia	128,222	78.94
PROMDI	Laissa Roque	34,201	21.05
Total votes		162,423	100
NUP hold			

==== 3rd District ====
Philippine House of Representatives Election at Bataan's 3rd District
Party	Candidate	Votes	%
NUP	Maria Angela Garcia	102,488	58.24
PDSP	Boboy Peliglorio	73,465	41.75
Total votes		175,953	100
NUP win (new seat)			

=== Provincial Board ===
Party	Votes	%	Seats
National Unity Party	265,298	25.21	3
Nacionalista Party	258,794	24.59	3
Lakas–CMD	179,680	17.07	2
Partido Demokratiko Pilipino-Lakas ng Bayan	166,128	15.78	2
Partido Demokratiko Sosyalista ng Pilipinas	90,414	8.59	–
PROMDI	84,315	8.01	–
Independent	7,907	0.75	–
Ex officio seats			3
Reserved seats			1
Total	1,052,536	100.00	14

==== 1st District ====
Bataan Provincial Board Election at Bataan's 1st District
Party	Candidate	Votes	%
Lakas	Antonino Roman III	91,618	18.39
Nacionalista	Benjie Serrano	79,767	16.01
PDP–Laban	Jomar Gaza	67,348	13.52
Independent	Armando Atienza	7,907	1.59
Total votes		246,640	100

==== 2nd District ====
Bataan Provincial Board Election at Bataan's 2nd District
Party	Candidate	Votes	%
NUP	Iya Roque	109,315	21.94
Nacionalista	Manny Beltran	93,385	18.74
Lakas	Noel Valdecañas	88,062	17.67
Total votes		290,762	100

==== 3rd District ====
Bataan Provincial Board Election at Bataan's 3rd District
Party	Candidate	Votes	%
PDP–Laban	Popoy Del Rosario	98,780	19.82
NUP	Doctor Jorge Estanislao	90,062	18.07
Nacionalista	Angel Sunga	85,642	17.19
NUP	Bro. Harold Espeleta	65,921	13.23
PDSP	Joel Ibarra	56,760	11.39
PROMDI	Marimel Lopez	45,226	9.08
PROMDI	Ace Liloc	39,089	7.84
PDSP	Anthony Zalavaria Galorpo	33,654	6.75
Total votes		515,134	100

=== City and Municipality ===
==== 1st District ====
- Municipalities: Abucay, Hermosa, Orani, Samal

===== Abucay =====
Abucay Mayoral Election
Party	Candidate	Votes	%
NUP	Robin Tagle	12,981	53.84
Lakas	Ana Santiago	10,525	43.65
Independent	Armando Madrid	605	2.51
Total votes		24,111	100.00

Abucay Vice Mayoral Election
Party	Candidate	Votes	%
Independent	Roberto Pabustan	10,664	44.42
NUP	Roy Samson	6,706	27.94
Lakas	Dexter "Teri Onor" Dominguez	5,644	23.51
Independent	Jayson Marcelo	991	4.13
Total votes		24,005	100.00

===== Hermosa =====
Hermosa Mayoral Election
Party	Candidate	Votes	%
PDP–Laban	Antonio Joseph Inton	22,742	53.96
PROMDI	Danilo Malana	19,402	46.04
Total votes		42,144	100.00

Hermosa Vice Mayoral Election
Party	Candidate	Votes	%
PDP–Laban	Patrick Rellosa	19,876	48.84
PROMDI	Christopher Vitug	11,057	27.17
Independent	Kristine Ann Alonzo-Gaza	991	4.13
Total votes		31,924	100.00

===== Orani =====
Orani Mayoral Election
Party	Candidate	Votes	%
Nacionalista	Efren Dominic Pascual	28,003	68.98
PDSP	Reynaldo Ibe Jr.	12,594	31.02
Total votes		40,597	100.00

Orani Vice Mayoral Election
Party	Candidate	Votes	%
Nacionalista	Emmanuel Roman	29,435	80.16
PDSP	Daniel Roman	7,287	19.84
Total votes		36,722	100.00

===== Samal =====
Samal Mayoral Election
Party	Candidate	Votes	%
Aksyon	Alexander Acuzar	15,895	60.29
Lakas	Aida Macalinao	10,471	39.71
Total votes		26,366	100.00

Samal Vice Mayoral Election
Party	Candidate	Votes	%
Lakas	Ronald Ortiguerra	13,295	51.45
Aksyon	Felix Espino Jr.	12,548	48.55
Total votes		25,843	100.00

==== 2nd District ====
- City: Balanga
- Municipalities: Limay, Orion, Pilar

===== Balanga =====
Balanga Mayoral Election
Party	Candidate	Votes	%
PDP–Laban	Francis Anthony Garcia	53,650	100.00
Total votes		53,650	100.00
PDP–Laban hold			

Balanga Vice Mayoral Election
Party	Candidate	Votes	%
PDP–Laban	Vianca Lita Gozon	51,255	100.00
Total votes		51,255	100.00
PDP–Laban hold			

===== Limay =====
Limay Mayoral Election
Party	Candidate	Votes	%
PDP–Laban	Nelson David	29,240	58.40
PROMDI	Lilvir Roque	20,829	41.60
Total votes		50,069	100.00

Limay Vice Mayoral Election
Party	Candidate	Votes	%
PDP–Laban	Richie Jason David	30,568	62.43
PROMDI	Robert Arvin Roque	18,399	37.57
Total votes		48,967	100.00

===== Orion =====
Orion Vice Mayoral Election
Party	Candidate	Votes	%
NUP	Antonio Raymundo	15,839	46.16
PROMDI	Jose Santos	11,288	32.89
PDSP	Ramon Hernandez	7,189	20.95
Total votes		34,316	100.00

Orion Vice Mayoral Election
Party	Candidate	Votes	%
NUP	Rex Joseph Fuster	21,346	100.00
Total votes		21,346	100.00
NUP hold			

===== Pilar =====
Pilar Mayoral Election
Party	Candidate	Votes	%
NUP	Carlos Pizarro Jr.	19,570	79.43
PFP	Eduardo Santos	5,069	20.57
Total votes		24,639	100.00

Pilar Vice Mayoral Election
Party	Candidate	Votes	%
NUP	Cecilia Garcia	17,456	72.49
PFP	Eduardo Santos Jr.	6,624	27.51
Total votes		24,080	100.00

==== 3rd District ====
- Municipalities: Bagac, Dinalupihan, Mariveles, Morong

===== Bagac =====
Bagac Mayoral Election
Party	Candidate	Votes	%
PDP–Laban	Ramil Del Rosario	10,913	52.55
PDSP	Dolores Ramos	9,159	44.10
Reporma	Eduardo Del Rosario	585	2.82
Independent	Cecilio Gunio	110	0.53
Total votes		20,767	100.00

Bagac Vice Mayoral Election
Party	Candidate	Votes	%
PDP–Laban	Ron Del Rosario	13,691	71.77
PDSP	Suzette Nojadera	5,385	28.23
Total votes		19,076	100.00

===== Dinalupihan =====
Dinalupihan Mayoral Election
Party	Candidate	Votes	%
NUP	German Santos Jr.	32,303	50.94
Aksyon	Joel Jaime Payumo	25,822	40.72
Liberal	Renato Matawaran	5,030	7.93
Independent	Jovito Nolasco	254	0.40
Total votes		63,409	100.00

Dinalupihan Vice Mayoral Election
Party	Candidate	Votes	%
Aksyon	Fernando Manalili	31,857	53.01
NUP	Armando Buniag	23,700	39.44
PDDS	Francis Miranda	3,847	6.40
Independent	Celso Alfredo Jr.	689	1.15
Total votes		60,093	100.00

===== Mariveles =====
Mariveles Mayoral Election
Party	Candidate	Votes	%
NUP	Ace Jello Concepcion	40,452	54.18
Aksyon	Jocelyn Castañeda	34,215	45.82
Total votes		74,667	100.00

Mariveles Vice Mayoral Election
Party	Candidate	Votes	%
NUP	Angelito Rubia	38,188	52.02
Aksyon	Frein Jarane Castañeda	35,223	47.98
Total votes		73,411	100.00

===== Morong =====
Morong Mayoral Election
Party	Candidate	Votes	%
NUP	Cynthia Linao-Estanislao	10,872	56.10
PDSP	Jose Calma Jr.	5,903	30.46
KBL	Mary Jane Garcia	2,422	12.50
PDDS	Mel Anthony Bautista	183	0.83
Total votes		19,380	100.00

Morong Vice Mayoral Election
Party	Candidate	Votes	%
NUP	Leila Linao-Muñoz	10,455	58.12
PDSP	Malou Castro-Calma	5,423	30.15
KBL	Ernesto Manalo	1,834	10.20
PDDS	Susan Cuizon	276	1.53
Total votes		17,988	100.00
