= Bataan Provincial Board =

Legislative body of the province of Bataan, Philippines

Bataan Provincial Board Sangguniang Panlalawigan ng Bataan
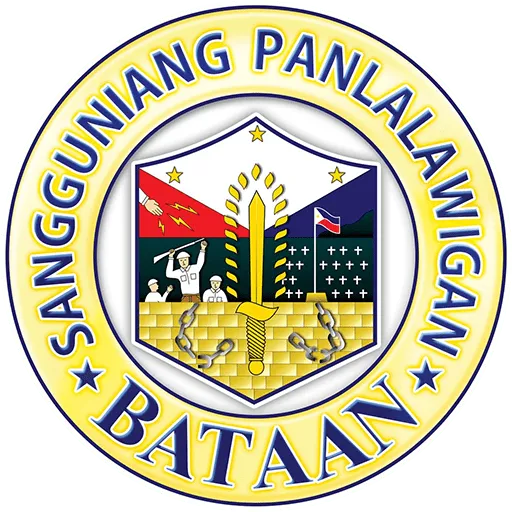

Type
- Type: Unicameral
- Term limits: 3 terms (9 years)

Leadership
- Presiding Officer: Ma. Cristina M. Garcia, PFP since June 30, 2019

Structure
- Seats: 14 board members 1 ex officio presiding officer
- Political groups: PFP (6) NUP (3) Nacionalista (3) TBD (1) Nonpartisan (3)
- Length of term: 3 years
- Authority: Local Government Code of the Philippines

Elections
- Voting system: Plurality-at-large (regular members); Indirect election (ex officio members); Acclamation (sectoral member)
- Last election: May 12, 2025
- Next election: May 15, 2028

Meeting place
- Bataan Provincial Building, Balanga

The Bataan Provincial Board is the Sangguniang Panlalawigan (provincial legislature) of the Philippine province of Bataan.

The members are elected via plurality-at-large voting: the province is divided into two districts, each sending five members to the provincial board; the electorate votes for five members, with the five candidates with the highest number of votes being elected. The vice governor is the ex officio presiding officer, and only votes to break ties. The vice governor is elected via the plurality voting system province-wide.

The districts used in electing board members are coextensive with the legislative districts of Bataan.

== District apportionment ==
Elections	No. of seats per district			Ex officio seats	Reserved seats	Total seats
Elections	1st	2nd	3rd	Ex officio seats	Reserved seats	Total seats
2004–2022	5	5	—	3	1	14
2022–present	3	3	4	3	1	14

== List of members ==
An additional three ex officio members are the presidents of the provincial chapters of the Association of Barangay Captains, the Councilors' League, the Sangguniang Kabataan provincial president; the municipal and city (if applicable) presidents of the Association of Barangay Captains, Councilor's League and Sangguniang Kabataan, shall elect amongst themselves their provincial presidents which shall be their representatives at the board.

=== Current members ===
These are the members after the 2025 local elections and 2023 barangay and SK elections:

- Vice Governor: Ma. Cristina M. Garcia (PFP)

Seat	Board member	Party	Start of term	End of term
1st district	Jomar L. Gaza	PFP	June 30, 2019	June 30, 2028
1st district	Mylene A. Serrano	Nacionalista	June 30, 2025	June 30, 2028
1st district	Godofredo B. Galicia Jr.	PFP	June 30, 2025	June 30, 2028
2nd district	Maria Margarita R. Roque	PFP	June 30, 2019	June 30, 2028
2nd district	Noel Joseph L. Valdecañas	PFP	June 30, 2022	June 30, 2028
2nd district	Victor A. Baluyot Jr.	PFP	June 30, 2025	June 30, 2028
3rd district	Romano L. Del Rosario	Nacionalista	June 30, 2019	June 30, 2028
3rd district	Angelito M. Sunga	Nacionalista	June 30, 2022	June 30, 2028
3rd district	Jorge S. Estanislao	NUP	June 30, 2022	June 30, 2028
3rd district	Roman Harold R. Espeleta	NUP	June 30, 2022	June 30, 2028
ABC	Romeo Austria	Nonpartisan	January 12, 2024	January 1, 2026
PCL	Jovy Z. Banzon	PFP	June 30, 2022	June 30, 2028
SK	Lovely Joy Poblete	Nonpartisan	November 27, 2023	January 1, 2026
IPMR	Feliciano Magay	Nonpartisan	August 7, 2023	August 7, 2026

=== Vice Governor ===
Election year	Name	Party
2001	Rogelio Roque	NPC
2004	Benjamin Alonzo	PDSP
2007	Serafin Roman	KAMPI
2010	Efren Pascual	Nacionalista
2013	Efren Pascual	Liberal
2016	Efren Pascual	NUP
2019	Cristina M. Garcia	NUP
2022	Cristina M. Garcia	NUP
2025	Cristina M. Garcia	PFP

=== 1st District ===
- Municipalities: Abucay, Hermosa, Orani, Samal
- Population (2020): 229,071

Election year	Member (party)	Member (party)	Member (party)	Member (party)	Member (party)
2004	Rodolfo Izon (NPC)	Edwin Enrile (NPC)	Edward Roman (NPC)	Rodolfo Salandanan (NPC)	Orlando Miranda (Lakas)
2007	Rodolfo Izon (Lakas)	Gaudencio Ferrer (NPC)	Edward Roman (Lakas)	Efren Pascual, Jr. (Lakas)	Orlando Miranda (Lakas)
2010	Efren Cruz (Lakas-Kampi)	Gaudencio Ferrer (Liberal)	Aristotle Gaza (Lakas-Kampi)	Jose Alejandro Payumo III (Liberal)	Teri Onor (Nacionalista)
2013	Rolando Tigas (NUP)	Gaudencio Ferrer (Liberal)	Aristotle Gaza (NUP)	Reynaldo Ibe (Liberal)	Teri Onor (Nacionalista)
2016	Benjamin Serrano Jr. (Nacionalista)	Teri Dominguez (NUP)	Aristotle Gaza (NUP)	Reynaldo Ibe (NUP)	Rolly Tigas (NUP)
2019	Benjamin Serrano Jr. (Nacionalista)	Jomar Gaza (PDP–Laban)	Godofredo Galicia (NUP)	Reynaldo Ibe (NUP)	Maria Dela Fuente (NUP)
2022	Benjamin Serrano Jr. (Nacionalista)	Jomar Gaza (PDP–Laban)	Antonino Roman III (Lakas)		

=== 2nd District ===
- City: Balanga
- Municipalities: Limay, Orion, Pilar
- Population (2020): 289,455

Election year	Member (party)	Member (party)	Member (party)	Member (party)	Member (party)
2004	Manuel Beltran (NPC)	Edgardo Calimbas (NPC)	Dante Manalaysay (NPC)	Fernando Austria (Lakas)	Eduard Florendo (Lakas)
2007	Manuel Beltran (KAMPI)	Edgardo Calimbas (KAMPI)	Angel Peliglorio, Jr. (NPC)	Gerardo Roxas (KAMPI)	Eduard Florendo (KAMPI)
2010	Manuel Beltran (Lakas-Kampi)	Jovy Banzon (Lakas-Kampi)	Dante Manalaysay (Lakas-Kampi)	Gerardo Roxas (Lakas-Kampi)	Eduard Florendo (Lakas-Kampi)
2013	Gerardo Roxas (NUP)	Edgardo Calimbas (NUP)	Dante Manalaysay (NUP)	Jovy Banzon (NUP)	Jose Villapando, Sr. (Liberal)
2016	Manuel Beltran (NUP)	Edgardo Calimbas (NUP)	Dante Manalaysay (NUP)	Jovy Banzon (NUP)	Peping Villapando (NUP)
2019	Manuel Beltran (NUP)	Edgardo Calimbas (NUP)	Maria Margarita Roque (NUP)	Jose Villapando, Sr. (NUP)	Romano Del Rosario (NUP)
2022	Manuel Beltran (NUP)	Noel Joseph Valdecañas (Lakas)	Maria Margarita Roque (NUP)		

=== 3rd District ===
- Municipalities: Bagac, Dinalupihan, Mariveles, Morong
- Population (2020): 334,847

Election year	Member (party)	Member (party)	Member (party)	Member (party)
2022	Romano Del Rosario (PDP–Laban)	Jorge Estanislao (NUP)	Angelito Sunga (Nacionalista)	Roman Harold Espeleta (NUP)

=== Ex officio seats ===
Election year	Liga ng mga Barangay	Sangguniang Kabataan
2018	Doroteo Austria	Precious Manuel
2023	Romeo Austria	Lovely Joy Poblete

Election year	PCL member
2019	Noel Joseph Valdecañas (PDP–Laban)
2022	Jovy Banzon (PDP–Laban)
2025	

=== Reserved seats ===
Selection year	Indigenous People Mandatory Representative
2019	Rosita Sison
2023	Feliciano Magay
