= Sabino de Leon Jr. =

Filipino lawyer and judge (1932-2003)

146th Associate Justice of the Supreme Court of the Philippines
- In office 11 October 1999 – June 2002

Personal details
- Born: June 1, 1932
- Died: June 16, 2003 (aged 71)
- Education: Ateneo de Manila University

Sabino de Leon Jr. (1 June 1932 - 16 June 2003) was a Filipino lawyer who served on the Supreme Court of the Philippines from 1999 to 2002.

== Early life and education ==
Sabino de Leon Jr. was born on 1 June 1932 in Pilar, Bataan. His father served as assistant mayor of Greater Manila for Quezon City, among other roles in local government over his life.

He attended Ateneo de Manila University, achieving his degree in law.

== Career ==
On 13 March 1990, de Leon was appointed an appellate judge in the Sandiganbayan's second division.

In 1999, he was appointed an Associate Justice of the Supreme Court of the Philippines by Joseph Estrada, where he served for three years before retiring in June 2002.

Despite being an Estrada appointee, de Leon was quoted as saying "Those who are knowledgeable don’t give too much importance to these comments of Erap" in response to attacks levied by him when Estrada accused the Court's Chief Justice of lobbying for his position. Additionally, he moved to impeach eight High Court Justices, and summoning four to testify before the Sandiganbayan.

== Notable cases ==
=== Estrada v Desierto (2001) ===
The Court ruled that Estrada had effectively resigned after he was ousted, rejecting the defence of duress. The Court also ruled that as he had effectively resigned, Presidential Immunity did not apply. De Leon ruled with the majority.

=== Secretary of Justice v Judge Lantion (2001) ===
The Court ruled that extradition is an executive function, rather than a criminal proceeding, therefore full constitutional rights do not apply. It also stated that the lack of notice of extradition is to prevent flight, and therefore giving notice of extradition would defeat this purpose. De Leon ruled with the majority.

== Death ==
On 16 June 2003, Sabino de Leon Jr. died. In response to his death, the Court's Chief Justice Hilario Davide Jr. "promised to defend the high court against attacks on its integrity", referencing comments by Estrada regarding his position while de Leon was in office.
