= Legislative districts of Bataan =

Legislative district of the Philippines

The legislative districts of Bataan are the representations of the province of Bataan in the various national legislatures of the Philippines. The province is currently represented in the lower house of the Congress of the Philippines through its first, second and third congressional districts.

== History ==
Before 1972, Bataan comprised a lone legislative district, electing one representative to the various national legislatures, except during the Japanese occupation of the Philippines when the province sent two representatives to the National Assembly of the Second Philippine Republic. Upon the restoration of the Philippine Commonwealth in 1945, the province continued to comprise a lone district.

The province was represented in the Interim Batasang Pambansa as part of Region III from 1978 to 1984, and elected one representative to the Regular Batasang Pambansa in 1984. Bataan was redistricted into two legislative districts under the new Constitution which took effect on February 7, 1987; both districts elected separate members to the restored House of Representatives starting that same year.

== Current Districts ==
NUP (2) Lakas–CMD (1)

Legislative districts and representatives of Bataan
District	Current Representative		Party	Constituent LGUs	Population (2020)	Area	Map
District	Image	Name	Party	Constituent LGUs	Population (2020)	Area	Map
1st		Antonino "Tony" B. Roman, III (since 2025); Orani	Lakas–CMD	List: Abucay; Hermosa; Orani; Samal	229,071	357.92 km^{2}	Map
2nd		Albert Garcia (since 2022); Balanga	NUP	List: Balanga; Limay; Orion; Pilar	289,455	318.24 km^{2}	Map
3rd		Maria Angela Garcia (since 2022); Dinalupihan	NUP	List: Bagac; Dinalupihan; Mariveles; Morong	334,847	696.82 km^{2}	Map

== Historical Districts ==
=== Philippine Assembly (1907–1916) ===
Representatives	Tenure
Jose M. Lerma	1907-1909
Tomas G. del Rosario	1910-1912
Pablo R. Tecson	1912-1916

=== House of Representatives (1916-1935) ===
Representatives	Tenure
Maximino delos Reyes	1916-1922
Antonio G. Llamas	1922-1925
Manuel S. Banson	1925-1928
Teodoro Camacho	1928-1931
Fortunato de Leon	1931-1934
Teodoro Camacho	1934-1935

=== 1935-1941 ===
Period	Representative
Commonwealth National Assembly; 1935–1941	Teodoro Camacho

=== 1943–1944 ===
Period	Representatives
National Assembly; 1943–1944	Joaquin J. Linao
National Assembly; 1943–1944	Simeon D. Salonga

=== 1945-1946 ===
Period	Representative
1st Commonwealth Congress; 1945–1946	Antonio G. Llamas

=== House of Representatives (1946–1972) ===
Representatives	Tenure
Bonifacio B. Camacho	1946-1949
Medina Ponce de Leon	1949-1953
Jose R. Nuguid	1954-1965
Pablo R. Roman	1966-1972

=== 1984–1986 ===
Period	Representative
Regular Batasang Pambansa; 1984–1986	Antonino P. Roman, Jr.
