= Joet Garcia =

Filipino politician

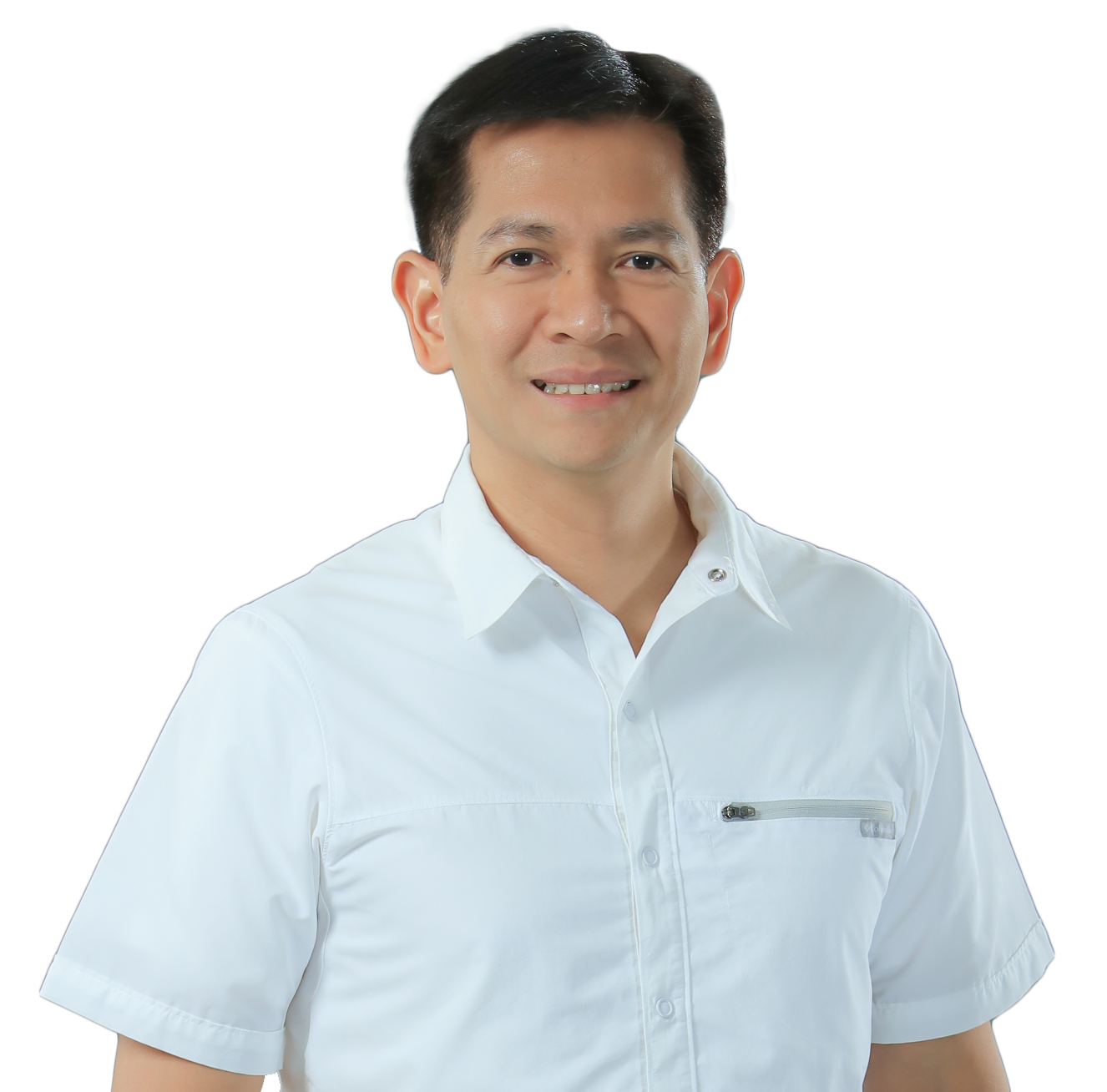

25th Governor of Bataan
- Incumbent
- Assumed office June 30, 2022
- Vice Governor: Cris Garcia
- Preceded by: Albert Garcia

Member of the Philippine House of Representatives from Bataan's 2nd district
- In office June 30, 2016 – June 30, 2022
- Preceded by: Tet Garcia
- Succeeded by: Albert Garcia

Mayor of Balanga
- In office June 30, 2007 – June 30, 2016
- Preceded by: Melanio S. Banzon Jr.
- Succeeded by: Francis Garcia

Personal details
- Born: Jose Enrique Sandejas Garcia III; November 12, 1971 (age 54) Manila, Philippines
- Party: PFP (2024–present); Partido Balikatan ng Bataan (local party)
- Other political affiliations: PDP (2021–2024); NUP (2011–2021); Lakas-CMD (2007–2011)
- Spouse: Maria Isabel Fernandez
- Children: 3
- Parent(s): Tet Garcia (father); Victoria Sandejas (mother)
- Relatives: Maria Angela Garcia (sister); Albert Garcia (brother)

Jose Enrique Sandejas Garcia III (born November 12, 1971) is a Filipino politician from Bataan. He is the incumbent governor of Bataan since June 30, 2022.

== Early life and education ==
Jose Enrique Garcia III was born on November 12, 1971 in Sampaloc, Manila.

== Career ==
Joet Garcia served as Mayor of Balanga from 2007 to 2016.

Garcia later served as Representative of Bataan's 2nd District from 2016 to 2022.

He got elected as governor of Bataan in the 2022 election and has assumed office since June 30, 2022.

== Personal life ==
Joet Garcia is part of a political family. His father Enrique "Tet" Garcia was governor of Bataan. His older brother, Albert Garcia, is a representative of the province's 2nd congressional district.

Joet Garcia is married to Maria Isabel Fernandez with whom he had three sons.

Political offices
| Preceded by Albert Garcia | Governor of Bataan; 2022–present | Incumbent |
| Preceded by Melanio Banzon Jr. | Mayor of Balanga; 2007–2016 | Succeeded by Francis Garcia |
House of Representatives of the Philippines
| Preceded by Enrique T. Garcia Jr. | Member of the House of Representatives from Bataan's 2nd district 2016–2022 | Succeeded by Albert Garcia |
