= Bataan's at-large congressional district =

Legislative district of the Philippines

Bataan's at-large congressional district refers to the lone congressional district of the Philippines in the province of Bataan for various national legislatures before 1987. The province elected its representatives province-wide at-large from its reorganization under Article 6 of the Decreto de 18 junio de 1898 y las instrucciones sobre el régimen de las provincias y pueblos for the Malolos Congress in 1898 until the creation of a first and second district on February 2, 1987. It was a single-member district throughout the ten legislatures of the Insular Government of the Philippine Islands from 1907 to 1935, the three legislatures of the Philippine Commonwealth from 1935 to 1946, the seven congresses of the Third Philippine Republic from 1946 to 1972, and the national parliament of the Fourth Philippine Republic from 1984 to 1986.

Bataan has had two instances in its history where more than one member represented it in the national legislatures. Three members were elected or appointed at-large for the National Assembly (Malolos Congress) of the First Philippine Republic from 1898 to 1901 and two members for the National Assembly of the Second Philippine Republic from 1943 to 1944.

After 1986, all representatives were elected from its congressional districts.

== Representation history ==
#	Term of office		National Assembly	Seat A				Seat B				Seat C			
#	Start	End	National Assembly	Image	Member	Party	Electoral history	Image	Member	Party	Electoral history	Image	Member	Party	Electoral history
=== Bataan's at-large district for the Malolos Congress ===
District created June 18, 1898.
–	September 15, 1898	March 23, 1901	1st		José Tuázon	Nonpartisan	Elected in 1898.		Hermógenes Marco	Nonpartisan	Appointed		Pedro Teopaco	Nonpartisan	Appointed
#	Term of office		Legislature	Single seat				Seats eliminated							
#	Start	End	Legislature	Image	Member	Party	Electoral history	Seats eliminated							
=== Bataan's at-large district for the Philippine Assembly ===								Seats eliminated							
District re-created January 9, 1907.								Seats eliminated							
1	October 16, 1907	October 16, 1909	1st		José María Lerma	Nacionalista	Elected in 1907.	Seats eliminated							
2	October 16, 1909	October 16, 1912	2nd		Tomás del Rosario	Progresista	Elected in 1909.	Seats eliminated							
3	October 16, 1912	October 16, 1916	3rd		Pablo Técson	Nacionalista	Elected in 1912.	Seats eliminated							
#	Term of office		Legislature	Single seat				Seats eliminated							
#	Start	End	Legislature	Image	Member	Party	Electoral history	Seats eliminated							
=== Bataan's at-large district for the House of Representatives of the Philippine Islands ===								Seats eliminated							
4	October 16, 1916	June 6, 1922	4th		Maximino de los Reyes	Nacionalista	Elected in 1916.	Seats eliminated							
4	October 16, 1916	June 6, 1922	5th		Maximino de los Reyes	Nacionalista	Re-elected in 1919.	Seats eliminated							
5	June 6, 1922	June 2, 1925	6th		Antonio G. Llamas	Demócrata	Elected in 1922.	Seats eliminated							
6	June 2, 1925	June 5, 1928	7th		Manuel S. Bánzon	Demócrata	Elected in 1925.	Seats eliminated							
7	June 5, 1928	June 2, 1931	8th		Teodoro Camacho	Nacionalista; Consolidado	Elected in 1928.	Seats eliminated							
8	June 2, 1931	June 5, 1934	9th		Fortunato de León	Demócrata	Elected in 1931.	Seats eliminated							
(7)	June 5, 1934	September 16, 1935	10th		Teodoro Camacho	Nacionalista; Democrático	Elected in 1934.	Seats eliminated							
#	Term of office		National Assembly	Single seat				Seats eliminated							
#	Start	End	National Assembly	Image	Member	Party	Electoral history	Seats eliminated							
=== Bataan's at-large district for the National Assembly (Commonwealth of the Philippines) ===								Seats eliminated							
(7)	September 16, 1935	December 30, 1941	1st		Teodoro Camacho	Nacionalista; Democrático	Re-elected in 1935.	Seats eliminated							
(7)	September 16, 1935	December 30, 1941	2nd		Teodoro Camacho	Nacionalista	Re-elected in 1938.	Seats eliminated							
#	Term of office		National Assembly	Seat A				Seat B				Seats restored			
#	Start	End	National Assembly	Image	Member	Party	Electoral history	Image	Member	Party	Electoral history	Seats restored			
=== Bataan's at-large district for the National Assembly (Second Philippine Republic) ===												Seats restored			
District re-created September 7, 1943.												Seats restored			
–	September 25, 1943	February 2, 1944	1st		Joaquín J. Linao	KALIBAPI	Elected in 1943.		Simeón D. Salonga	KALIBAPI	Appointed as an ex officio member.	Seats restored			
#	Term of office		Common wealth Congress	Single seat				Seats eliminated							
#	Start	End	Common wealth Congress	Image	Member	Party	Electoral history	Seats eliminated							
=== Bataan's at-large district for the House of Representatives of the Commonwealth of the Philippines ===								Seats eliminated							
District re-created May 24, 1945.								Seats eliminated							
(5)	–	–	1st		Antonio G. Llamas	Nacionalista	Elected in 1941. Died before start of term.	Seats eliminated							
#	Term of office		Congress	Single seat				Seats eliminated							
#	Start	End	Congress	Image	Member	Party	Electoral history	Seats eliminated							
=== Bataan's at-large district for the House of Representatives of the Philippines ===								Seats eliminated							
9	May 25, 1946	December 30, 1949	1st		Bonifacio Camacho	Nacionalista	Elected in 1946.	Seats eliminated							
10	December 30, 1949	December 30, 1953	2nd		Medina Lacson de León	Nacionalista	Elected in 1949.	Seats eliminated							
11	December 30, 1953	December 30, 1965	3rd		José R. Nuguid	Nacionalista	Elected in 1953.	Seats eliminated							
11	December 30, 1953	December 30, 1965	4th		José R. Nuguid	Nacionalista	Re-elected in 1957.	Seats eliminated							
11	December 30, 1953	December 30, 1965	5th		José R. Nuguid	Nacionalista	Re-elected in 1961.	Seats eliminated							
12	December 30, 1965	September 23, 1972	6th		Pablo R. Román	Liberal	Elected in 1965.	Seats eliminated							
12	December 30, 1965	September 23, 1972	7th		Pablo R. Román	Nacionalista	Re-elected in 1969. Removed from office after imposition of martial law.	Seats eliminated							
District dissolved into the sixteen-seat Region III's at-large district for the Interim Batasang Pambansa.								Seats eliminated							
#	Term of office		Batasang Pambansa	Single seat				Seats eliminated							
#	Start	End	Batasang Pambansa	Image	Member	Party	Electoral history	Seats eliminated							
=== Bataan's at-large district for the Regular Batasang Pambansa ===								Seats eliminated							
District re-created February 1, 1984.								Seats eliminated							
–	July 23, 1984	March 25, 1986	2nd		Antonino P. Roman	KBL	Elected in 1984.	Seats eliminated							
District dissolved into Bataan's 1st and 2nd districts.								Seats eliminated							

== See also ==
- Legislative districts of Bataan
