= Bataan's 2nd congressional district =

House of Representatives of the Philippines legislative district

- Constituency for the House of Representatives of the Philippines
- Map
- Location of Bataan within the Philippines
- Province: Bataan
- Region: Central Luzon
- Population: 289,455 (2020)
- Electorate: 199,306 (2025)
- Major settlements: 4 LGUs: Cities; Balanga; Municipalities; Limay; Orion; Pilar
- Area: 318.24 km^{2} (122.87 sq mi)199,306 (2025)

Current constituency
- Created: 1987
- Representative: Albert Garcia
- Political party: NUP
- Congressional bloc: Majority

Bataan's 2nd congressional district is one of the three congressional districts of the Philippines in the province of Bataan. It has been represented in the House of Representatives since 1987. The district consists of the provincial capital Balanga and adjacent eastern Bataan municipalities of Limay, Orion and Pilar. The southwestern municipalities of Bagac and Mariveles were once part of the district until these were reassigned to the third district effective 2022. It is currently represented in the 19th Congress by Albert Garcia of the National Unity Party (NUP).

== Representation history ==
#	Image	Member	Term of office		Congress	Party	Electoral history	Constituent LGUs
#	Image	Member	Start	End	Congress	Party	Electoral history	Constituent LGUs
=== Bataan's 2nd district for the House of Representatives of the Philippines ===
District created February 2, 1987 from Bataan's at-large district.
1		Tet Garcia	June 30, 1987	June 30, 1992	8th	PDP–Laban	Elected in 1987.	1987–2022; Bagac, Balanga, Limay, Mariveles, Orion, Pilar
1		Tet Garcia	June 30, 1987	June 30, 1992	8th	LDP	Elected in 1987.	1987–2022; Bagac, Balanga, Limay, Mariveles, Orion, Pilar
2		Dominador N. Venegas	June 30, 1992	June 30, 1995	9th	Lakas	Elected in 1992.	1987–2022; Bagac, Balanga, Limay, Mariveles, Orion, Pilar
(1)		Tet Garcia	June 30, 1995	June 30, 2004	10th	LDP	Elected in 1995.	1987–2022; Bagac, Balanga, Limay, Mariveles, Orion, Pilar
(1)		Tet Garcia	June 30, 1995	June 30, 2004	11th	LDP	Re-elected in 1998.	1987–2022; Bagac, Balanga, Limay, Mariveles, Orion, Pilar
(1)		Tet Garcia	June 30, 1995	June 30, 2004	12th	Lakas	Re-elected in 2001.	1987–2022; Bagac, Balanga, Limay, Mariveles, Orion, Pilar
3		Albert Garcia	June 30, 2004	June 30, 2013	13th	Lakas	Elected in 2004.	1987–2022; Bagac, Balanga, Limay, Mariveles, Orion, Pilar
3		Albert Garcia	June 30, 2004	June 30, 2013	14th	Lakas	Re-elected in 2007.	1987–2022; Bagac, Balanga, Limay, Mariveles, Orion, Pilar
3		Albert Garcia	June 30, 2004	June 30, 2013	15th	NUP	Re-elected in 2010.	1987–2022; Bagac, Balanga, Limay, Mariveles, Orion, Pilar
(1)		Tet Garcia	June 30, 2013	June 13, 2016	16th	NUP	Elected in 2013. Died.	1987–2022; Bagac, Balanga, Limay, Mariveles, Orion, Pilar
4		Joet Garcia	June 30, 2016	June 30, 2022	17th	NUP	Elected in 2016.	1987–2022; Bagac, Balanga, Limay, Mariveles, Orion, Pilar
4		Joet Garcia	June 30, 2016	June 30, 2022	18th	PDP–Laban	Re-elected in 2019.	1987–2022; Bagac, Balanga, Limay, Mariveles, Orion, Pilar
(3)		Albert Garcia	June 30, 2022	Incumbent	19th	NUP	Elected in 2022.	2022–present Balanga, Limay, Orion, Pilar
(3)		Albert Garcia	June 30, 2022	Incumbent	20th	NUP	Re-elected in 2025.	2022–present Balanga, Limay, Orion, Pilar

== Election results ==
=== 2025 ===
Candidate	Party	Votes	%
Albert Garcia (incumbent)	National Unity Party	149,614	100.00
Total		149,614	100.00
Valid votes		149,614	86.39
Invalid/blank votes		23,562	13.61
Total votes		173,176	100.00
Registered voters/turnout		199,306	86.89
National Unity Party hold			
Source: Commission on Elections

=== 2022 ===
2022 Philippine House of Representatives elections
Party	Candidate	Votes	%
NUP	Albert Garcia	107,496	75.86
PROMDI	Laissa Roque	34,201	24.14
Total votes		141,697	100.00
NUP gain from PDP–Laban			

=== 2019 ===
2019 Philippine House of Representatives elections
Party	Candidate	Votes	%
NUP	Joet Garcia	173,701	100
Total votes		173,701	100
NUP hold			

== See also ==
- Legislative districts of Bataan
