= Bataan's 1st congressional district =

House of Representatives of the Philippines legislative district

- Constituency for the House of Representatives of the Philippines
- Map
- Location of Bataan within the Philippines
- Province: Bataan
- Region: Central Luzon
- Population: 229,071 (2020)
- Electorate: 163,095 (2025)
- Major settlements: 4 LGUs: Municipalities; Abucay; Hermosa; Orani; Samal
- Area: 357.92 km^{2} (138.19 sq mi)

Current constituency
- Created: 1987
- Representative: Antonino B. Roman III
- Political party: Lakas–CMD
- Congressional bloc: TBD

Bataan's 1st congressional district is one of the three congressional districts of the Philippines in the province of Bataan. It has been represented in the House of Representatives since 1987. The district consists of municipalities in northeastern Bataan, namely Abucay, Hermosa, Orani and Samal. The northern municipalities of Dinalupihan and Morong were once part of the district until these were reassigned to the third district effective 2022. It is currently represented in the 20th Congress by Antonino Roman III of the Lakas–CMD.

== Representation history ==
#	Image	Member	Term of office		Congress	Party	Electoral history	Constituent LGUs
#	Image	Member	Start	End	Congress	Party	Electoral history	Constituent LGUs
=== Bataan's 1st district for the House of Representatives of the Philippines ===
District created February 2, 1987 from Bataan's at-large district.
1		Felicito Payumo	June 30, 1987	June 30, 1998	8th	Liberal	Elected in 1987.	1987–2022; Abucay, Dinalupihan, Hermosa, Morong, Orani, Samal
1		Felicito Payumo	June 30, 1987	June 30, 1998	9th	Liberal	Re-elected in 1992.	1987–2022; Abucay, Dinalupihan, Hermosa, Morong, Orani, Samal
1		Felicito Payumo	June 30, 1987	June 30, 1998	10th	Liberal	Re-elected in 1995.	1987–2022; Abucay, Dinalupihan, Hermosa, Morong, Orani, Samal
2		Antonino Roman	June 30, 1998	June 30, 2007	11th	LAMMP	Elected in 1998.	1987–2022; Abucay, Dinalupihan, Hermosa, Morong, Orani, Samal
2		Antonino Roman	June 30, 1998	June 30, 2007	12th	Independent	Re-elected in 2001.	1987–2022; Abucay, Dinalupihan, Hermosa, Morong, Orani, Samal
2		Antonino Roman	June 30, 1998	June 30, 2007	13th	Liberal	Re-elected in 2004.	1987–2022; Abucay, Dinalupihan, Hermosa, Morong, Orani, Samal
3		Herminia Roman	June 30, 2007	June 30, 2016	14th	Lakas	Elected in 2007.	1987–2022; Abucay, Dinalupihan, Hermosa, Morong, Orani, Samal
3		Herminia Roman	June 30, 2007	June 30, 2016	15th	Liberal	Re-elected in 2010.	1987–2022; Abucay, Dinalupihan, Hermosa, Morong, Orani, Samal
3		Herminia Roman	June 30, 2007	June 30, 2016	16th	Liberal	Re-elected in 2013.	1987–2022; Abucay, Dinalupihan, Hermosa, Morong, Orani, Samal
4		Geraldine Roman	June 30, 2016	June 30, 2025	17th	Liberal	Elected in 2016.	1987–2022; Abucay, Dinalupihan, Hermosa, Morong, Orani, Samal
4		Geraldine Roman	June 30, 2016	June 30, 2025	18th	PDP–Laban	Re-elected in 2019.	1987–2022; Abucay, Dinalupihan, Hermosa, Morong, Orani, Samal
4		Geraldine Roman	June 30, 2016	June 30, 2025	19th	Lakas	Re-elected in 2022.	2022–present Abucay, Hermosa, Orani, Samal
5		Antonino B. Roman III	June 30, 2025	Incumbent	20th	Lakas	Elected in 2025.	2022–present Abucay, Hermosa, Orani, Samal

== Election results ==
=== 2025 ===
Candidate	Party	Votes	%
Antonino Roman III	Lakas–CMD	114,677	100.00
Total		114,677	100.00
Valid votes		114,677	84.07
Invalid/blank votes		21,733	15.93
Total votes		136,410	100.00
Registered voters/turnout		163,095	83.64
Lakas–CMD hold			
Source: Commission on Elections

=== 2022 ===
2022 Philippine House of Representatives elections
Party	Candidate	Votes	%
Lakas	Geraldine Roman	107,496	100.00
Total votes		107,496	100.00
Lakas hold			

=== 2019 ===
2019 Philippine House of Representatives elections
Party	Candidate	Votes	%
PDP–Laban	Geraldine Roman	152,253	91.59
KDP	Emelita "Emy" Lubag	13,983	8.41
Total votes		266,236	100.00
PDP–Laban hold			

=== 2016 ===
2016 Philippine House of Representatives elections
Party	Candidate	Votes	%
Liberal	Geraldine Roman	106,015	62.12
Aksyon	Danny Malana	64,643	37.88
Total votes		170,658	100.00
Liberal hold			

=== 2013 ===
2013 Philippine House of Representatives elections
Party	Candidate	Votes	%
Liberal	Herminia Roman	87,535	59.30
NPC	Felicito Payumo	60,084	40.70
Total votes		147,619	100.00
Liberal hold			

=== 2010 ===
2010 Philippine House of Representatives elections
Party	Candidate	Votes	%
Lakas–Kampi	Herminia Roman	80,400	51.27
Independent	Maria Angela Garcia	76,428	48.73
Total votes		156,828	100.00
Lakas–Kampi hold			

== See also ==
- Legislative districts of Bataan
