= Antonino Roman III =

Filipino politician and content creator

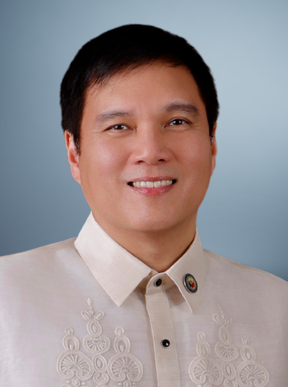
- Official portrait, 2025

Member of the Philippine House of Representatives from Bataan's 1st District
- Incumbent
- Assumed office June 30, 2025
- Preceded by: Geraldine Roman

Member of the Bataan Provincial Board form the 1st district
- In office June 30, 2022 – June 30, 2025

Personal details
- Born: Antonino Batista Roman III; June 3, 1968 (age 58) Ermita, Manila, Philippines
- Party: Lakas (2021–present)
- Education: Ateneo de Manila University (BA, LL.B,); Columbia University (LL.M)

Antonino "Tony" Batista Roman III (born July 3, 1968) is a Filipino politician, lawyer, and internet personality who currently serves as Representative of Bataan's 1st district since June 2025.

He ran in the 2022 Philippine general election as a board member, winning first place. He ran for the congressman for the first district of Bataan, winning unopposed.

== Early life and education ==
Antonino Roman III was born on July 3, 1968 in Ermita, Manila, to Antonino Roman and Herminia Batista. He had his elementary education in the Victoria School Foundation from 1975 to 1981. He had his secondary education in the University of the Philippines Integrated School from 1981 to 1985. He had his tertiary education in Ateneo de Manila University from 1985 to 1989, gaining a Bachelor of Arts Degree in Economics. He had his graduate school at Ateneo, attaining a Juris Doctor. He had his post-graduate studies the Columbia University from 1996 to 1997, gaining a Master of Laws, at the University of Cambridge in 2019, gaining a High Impact Leadership Certificate, and from 2019 to 2022 at the Harvard Kennedy School.

== Political career ==
In the 2022 elections in Bataan, he ran as a board member for the Bataan Provincial Board in the first district under Lakas–CMD (Lakas). He won, gaining first place out of three winning candidates with 91,618 votes, 18.39 percent of the votes. During his term, he was proclaimed as a 'TikTok Lawyer', giving free legal advice in the platform. In the 2025 Philippine House of Representatives elections, he ran as the congressman for Bataan's 1st congressional district under Lakas. He won unopposed with 114,677 votes, 19.57 percent of the votes.

== Electoral history ==
Electoral history of Antonino Roman III
Year	Office	Party	Votes received				Result
Year	Office	Party	Total	%	P.	Swing	Result
2022	Board Member (Bataan–1st)	Lakas	91,618	18.39%	1st	—N/a	Won
2025	Representative (Bataan–1st)	Lakas	114,677	100.00%	1st	—N/a	Unopposed
