= Albert Garcia =

Filipino politician

Albert S. Garcia
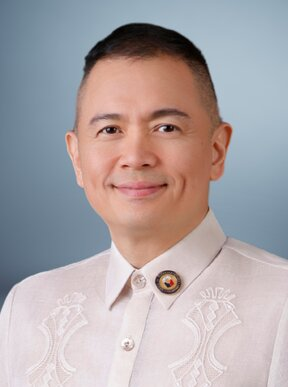
- Official portrait, 2025

Member of the Philippine House of Representatives from Bataan's 2nd district
- Incumbent
- Assumed office June 30, 2022
- Preceded by: Joet Garcia
- In office June 30, 2004 – June 30, 2013
- Preceded by: Tet Garcia
- Succeeded by: Tet Garcia

24th Governor of Bataan
- In office June 30, 2013 – June 30, 2022
- Vice Governor: Efren B. Pascual (2013–2016); Jovy Banzon (acting) (2016–2017); Maria Cristina Garcia (2017–2022)
- Preceded by: Tet Garcia
- Succeeded by: Joet Garcia

Mayor of Balanga
- In office June 30, 1998 – June 30, 2004
- Preceded by: Melanio Banzon Jr.
- Succeeded by: Melanio Banzon Jr.

Personal details
- Born: Albert Raymond Sandejas Garcia; February 1, 1970 (age 56) New York City, U.S.
- Party: NUP (2011–present); Partido Balikatan ng Bataan (local party)
- Other political affiliations: Lakas-CMD (1998–2011)
- Relations: Maria Angela Garcia (sister); Joet Garcia (brother)
- Parent(s): Tet Garcia (father); Victoria Sandejas (mother)
- Nickname: Abet

Albert Raymond "Abet" Sandejas Garcia (born February 1, 1970) is a Filipino politician. He currently serves as a member of the Philippine House of Representatives representing the 2nd District of Bataan since 2022. He served as the 24th provincial Governor of Bataan from 2013 to 2022 under the National Unity Party, which also he is the president of the political party. He has previously been elected to two terms as a Member of the House of Representatives, representing the 2nd District of Bataan. He first won election to Congress in 2004 and was re-elected in 2007. Prior to his election to Congress, Garcia served two terms as mayor of Balanga from 1998 to 2004.

== See also ==
- Tau Gamma Phi

Political offices
Preceded by Enrique Garcia Jr.	Governor of Bataan; 2013–2022	Succeeded by Joet Garcia
Preceded by Melanio Banzon Jr.	Mayor of Balanga; 1998–2004	Succeeded by Francis Garcia
House of Representatives of the Philippines
Preceded by Joet Garcia	Member of the House of Representatives from Bataan's 2nd district 2022–present	Incumbent
Preceded by Enrique T. Garcia Jr.	Member of the House of Representatives from Bataan's 2nd district 2004–2013	Succeeded by Tet Garcia
