= Orani =

Municipality in Bataan, Philippines

- Municipality
- Municipality of Orani
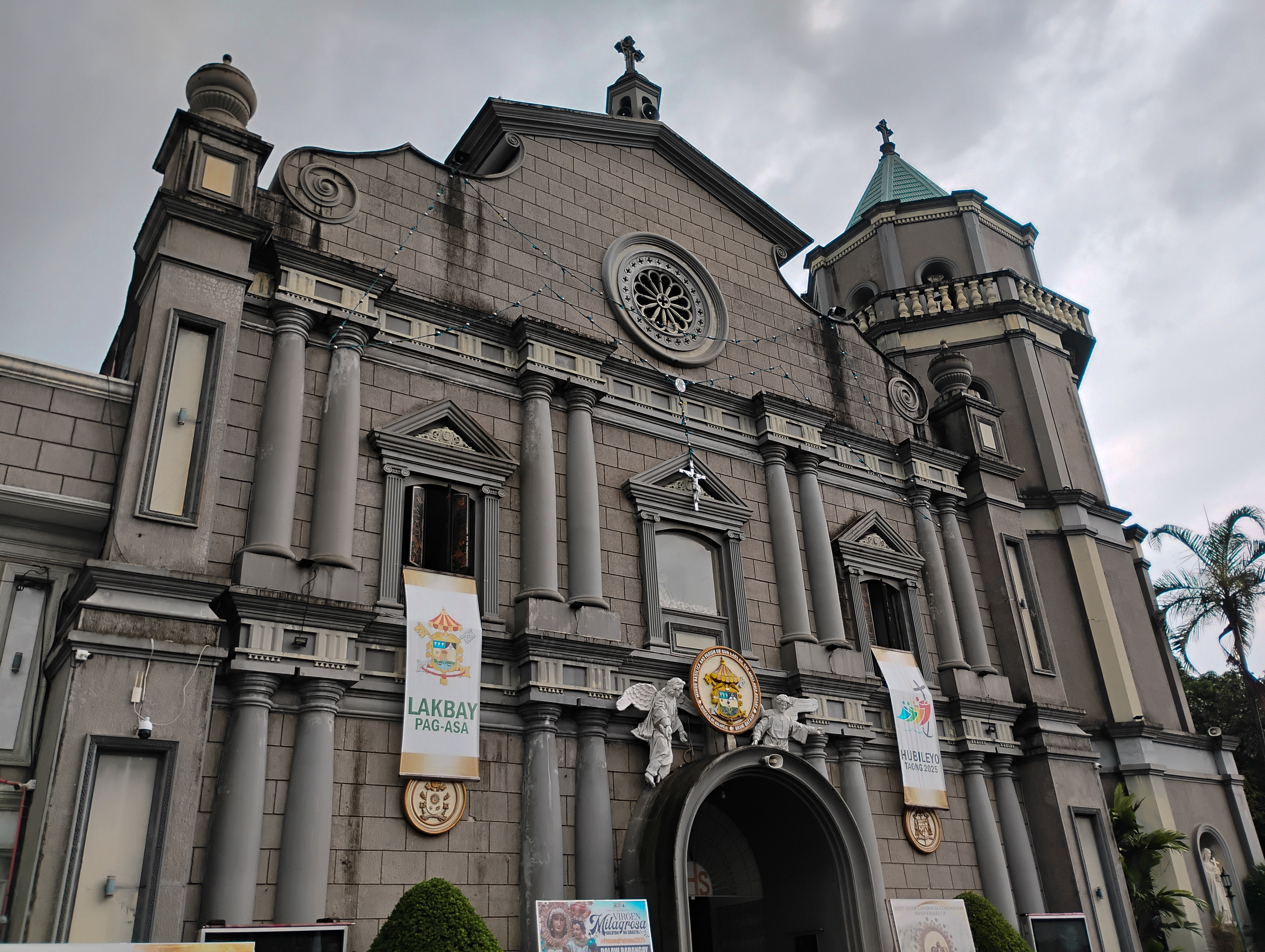
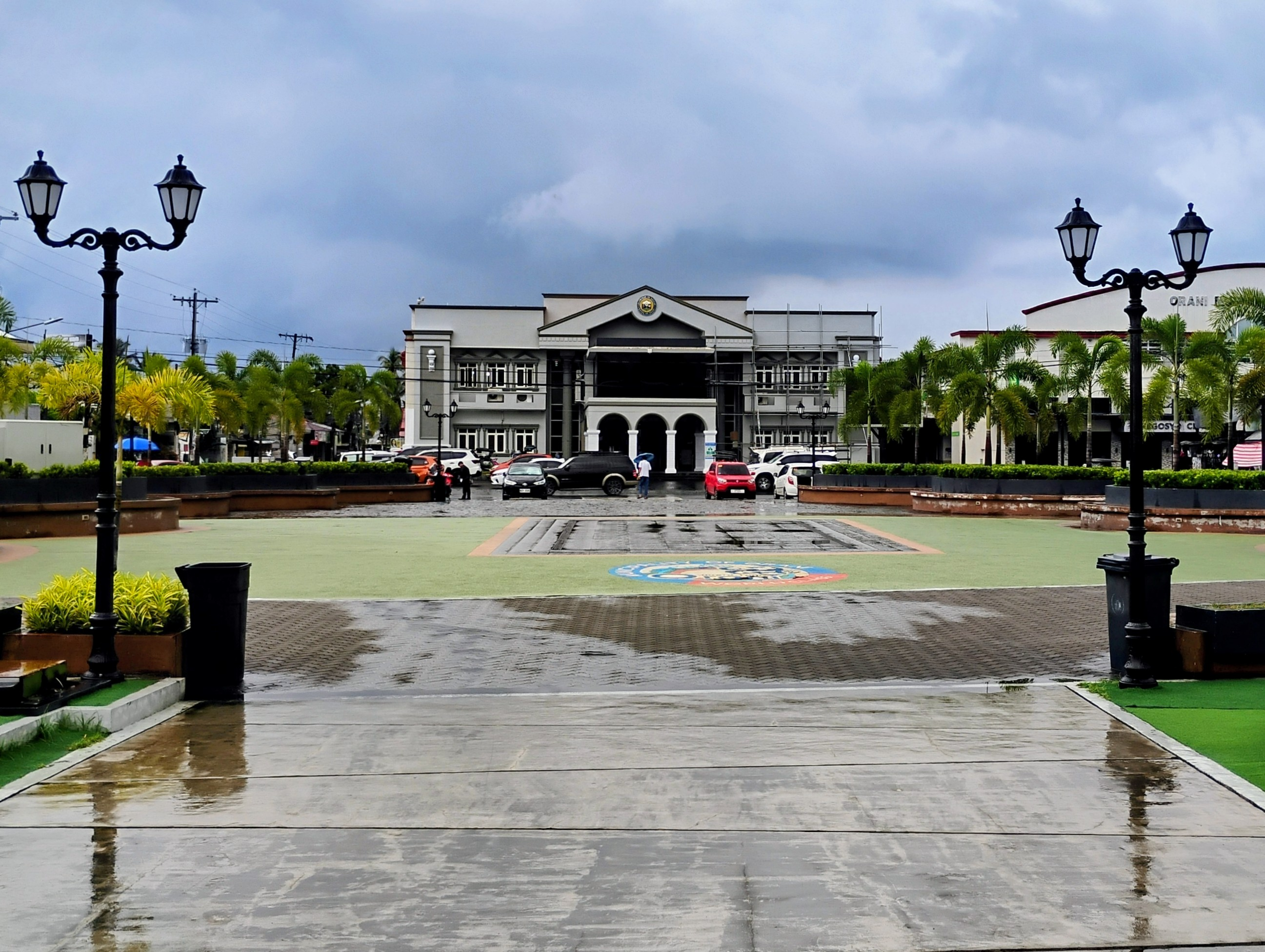
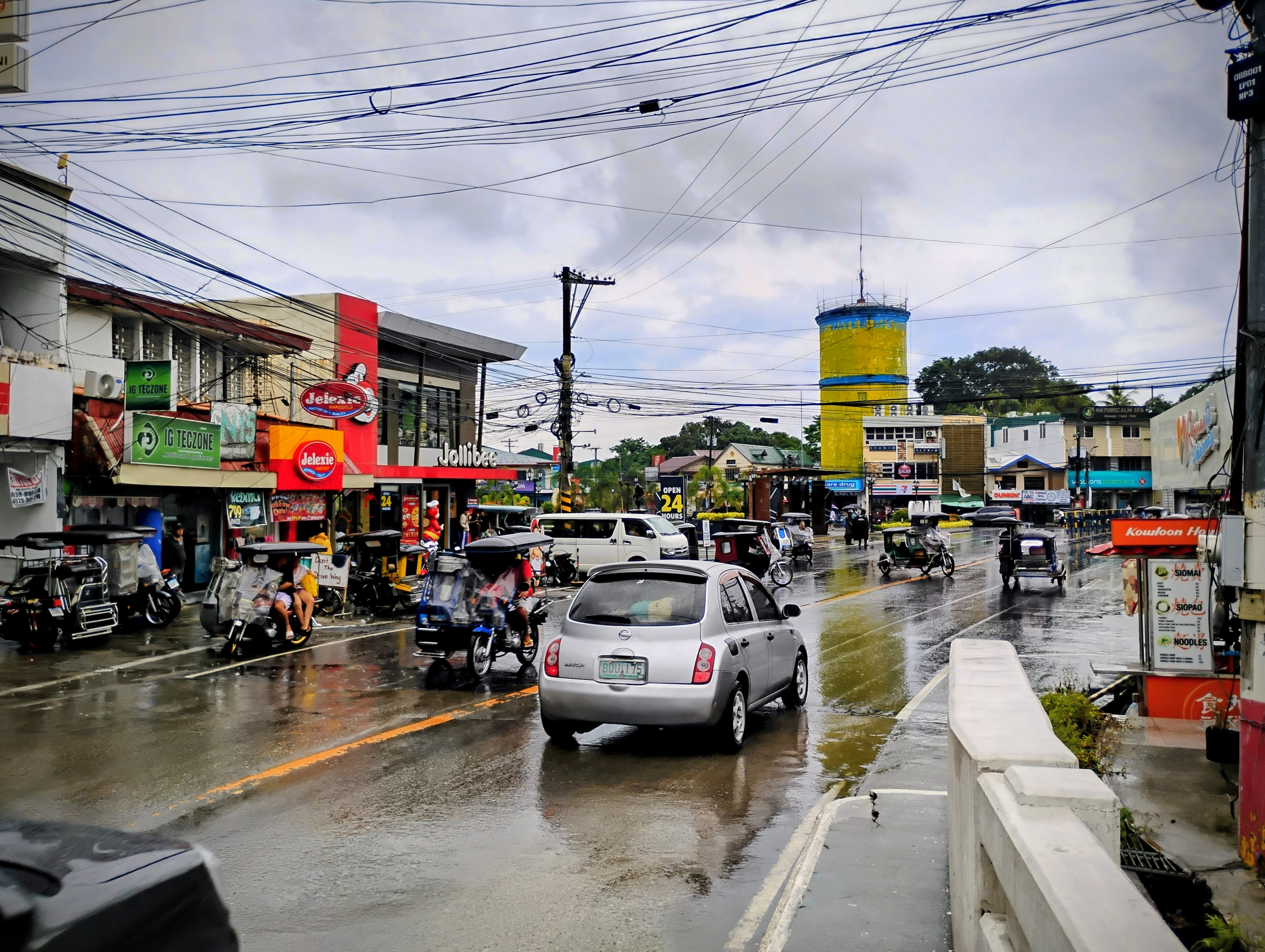
- Minor Basilica of Our Lady of the Most Holy Rosary Orani Municipal Hall & Town Plaza Orani Town Proper

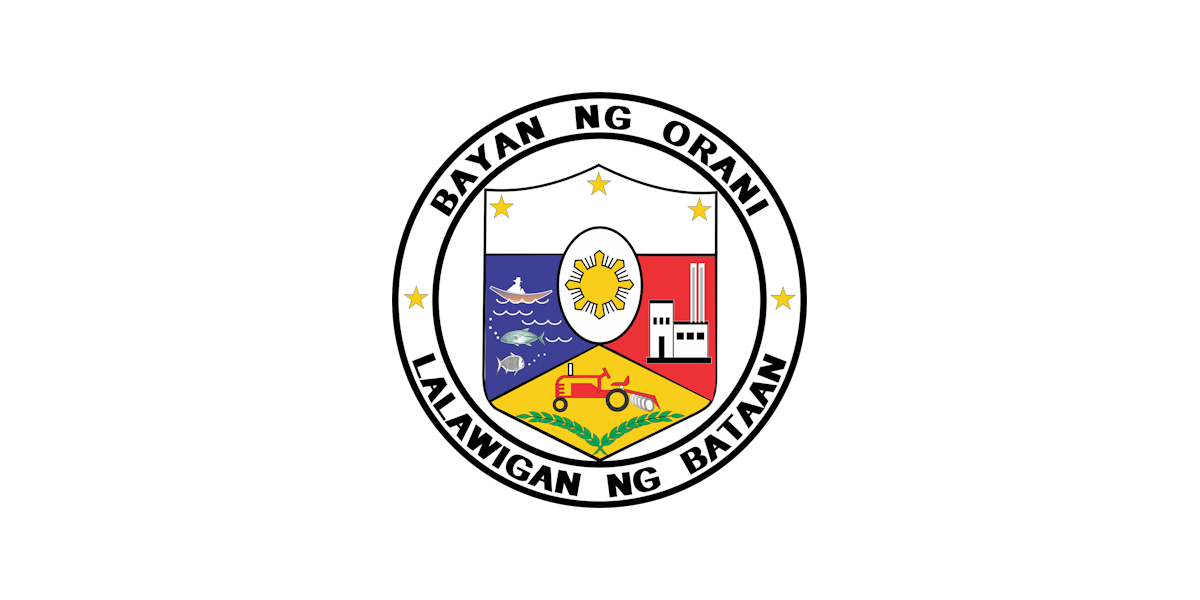
- Flag Seal

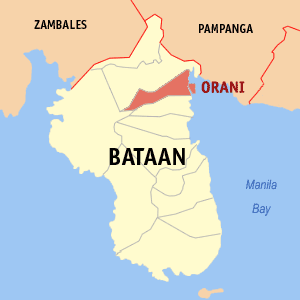
- Map of Bataan with Orani highlighted
- Interactive map of Orani
- Location within the Philippines
- Coordinates: 14°48′N 120°32′E
- Country: Philippines
- Region: Central Luzon
- Province: Bataan
- District: 1st district
- Founded: 1891
- Barangays: 29 (see Barangays)

Government
  - Type: Sangguniang Bayan
  - Mayor: Antonio "Jon" F. Arizapa, Jr.
  - Vice Mayor: Emmanuel R. Roman
  - Representative: Antonino B. Roman III
  - Municipal Council: Members: Maria Abba N. Sicat; Francis S. dela Torre; Bonifacio F. Cruz Jr.; Mayfair B. Sibug; Lyndon T. Pascual; Jun Anthony I. Reyes; John Paul G. Apostol; June M. Flores
  - Electorate: 51,331 voters (2025)

Area
  - Total: 64.90 km^{2} (25.06 sq mi)
- Elevation: 14 m (46 ft)
- Highest elevation: 117 m (384 ft)
- Lowest elevation: −4 m (−13 ft)

Population (2024 census)
  - Total: 72,941
  - Density: 1,124/km^{2} (2,911/sq mi)
  - Households: 17,524

Economy
  - Income class: 1st municipal income class
  - Poverty incidence: 7.48% (2023)
  - Revenue: ₱ 348.1 million (2024)
  - Assets: ₱ 613.3 million (2024)
  - Expenditure: ₱ 328.9 million (2024)
  - Liabilities: ₱ 319.2 million (2024)

Service provider
  - Electricity: Peninsula Electric Cooperative (PENELCO)
- Time zone: UTC+8 (PST)
- ZIP code: 2108
- PSGC: 0300809000
- IDD : area code: +63 (0)47
- Native languages: Mariveleño; Kapampangan; Tagalog

Orani, officially the Municipality of Orani (Tagalog: Bayan ng Orani), is a municipality in the province of Bataan, Philippines. According to the 2024 census, it has a population of 72,941 people.

== Etymology ==
According to legend, while a Spaniard was exploring a dense forest in what is now Orani, Bataan, he encountered a native who was chopping down a large tree. When the Spaniard asked the name of the tree, the native replied "narra." However, the Spaniard misunderstood and thought the native said "no ira," which means "unselfish" in Spanish. The Spaniard rearranged the letters from these words to form the name "Orani," which eventually became the official name of the town.

== History ==
In 1714, the town and church of Orani were established as an independent missionary center. The Dominican friars constructed the church, which served as their quarters in Bataan. The 1818 Spanish census showed there to be 1,668 native families and 24 Spanish-Filipino families. Orani grew into a prosperous town, but suffered significant damage during the earthquake of September 16, 1852, which destroyed the church and municipal government building.

Reconstruction began in 1891, but progress was interrupted by a major fire on March 16, 1938, which burned most of the town, including schools, the church, and town hall. Reconstruction efforts were halted by the outbreak of World War II, which caused further devastation. However, after the war, the town began rebuilding again.

== Geography ==
Orani is 14 kilometres (8.7 mi) from Balanga and 110 kilometres (68 mi) north-west of Manila and accessible via the Bataan Provincial Expressway, off Exit 20. It is bounded on the north by Hermosa, south by Samal, west by Dinalupihan and east by Manila Bay. It has a total land area of 64.90 square kilometres (25.06 sq mi) covering 29 barangays. About 1,231 hectares (3,040 acres) are used for agriculture, 1,943.86 hectares (4,803.4 acres) are forestland, 971.93 hectares (2,401.7 acres) are forest reservation and 1,295.9 hectares (3,202 acres) are reserved for the National Park. The rest are classified as wetland.

According to the Philippine Statistics Authority, the municipality has a land area of 64.90 square kilometres (25.06 sq mi) constituting 4.73% of the 1,372.98-square-kilometre- (530.11 sq mi) total area of Bataan.

=== Climate ===
Climate data for Orani, Bataan
Month	Jan	Feb	Mar	Apr	May	Jun	Jul	Aug	Sep	Oct	Nov	Dec	Year
Mean daily maximum °C (°F)	31 (88)	32 (90)	34 (93)	35 (95)	33 (91)	31 (88)	29 (84)	29 (84)	29 (84)	29 (84)	30 (86)	31 (88)	31 (88)
Mean daily minimum °C (°F)	19 (66)	19 (66)	20 (68)	23 (73)	25 (77)	25 (77)	24 (75)	25 (77)	25 (77)	24 (75)	23 (73)	20 (68)	23 (73)
Average precipitation mm (inches)	7 (0.3)	8 (0.3)	14 (0.6)	26 (1.0)	127 (5.0)	210 (8.3)	263 (10.4)	272 (10.7)	218 (8.6)	114 (4.5)	46 (1.8)	21 (0.8)	1,326 (52.3)
Average rainy days	4.0	4.0	6.9	11.2	21.0	24.5	27.4	26.9	25.9	21.9	13.4	6.3	193.4
Source: Meteoblue (modeled/calculated data, not measured locally)

=== Barangays ===
Orani is politically subdivided into 29 barangays. Each barangay consists of puroks and some have sitios.

PSGC	Barangay	Population			±% p.a.	
		2024		2010		
030809025	Apollo	2.7%	1,955	1,857	▴	0.36%
030809001	Bagong Paraiso (Poblacion)	3.9%	2,835	2,276	▴	1.53%
030809002	Balut (Poblacion)	1.9%	1,355	1,397	▾	−0.21%
030809003	Bayan (Poblacion)	8.3%	6,018	5,363	▴	0.80%
030809004	Calero (Poblacion)	2.0%	1,438	1,686	▾	−1.10%
030809016	Centro I (Poblacion)	0.7%	501	404	▴	1.50%
030809006	Centro II (Poblacion)	0.6%	431	400	▴	0.52%
030809007	Dona	1.7%	1,249	1,213	▴	0.20%
030809026	Kabalutan	3.4%	2,462	2,099	▴	1.11%
030809008	Kaparangan	4.1%	3,021	3,123	▾	−0.23%
030809027	Maria Fe	2.9%	2,146	2,046	▴	0.33%
030809009	Masantol	0.9%	690	736	▾	−0.45%
030809010	Mulawin	6.0%	4,380	3,534	▴	1.50%
030809011	Pag‑asa	3.4%	2,486	1,927	▴	1.78%
030809005	Paking‑Carbonero (Poblacion)	1.6%	1,164	1,272	▾	−0.61%
030809012	Palihan (Poblacion)	3.5%	2,581	2,452	▴	0.36%
030809013	Pantalan Bago (Poblacion)	3.1%	2,250	2,130	▴	0.38%
030809014	Pantalan Luma (Poblacion)	7.6%	5,563	5,026	▴	0.71%
030809015	Parang-Parang (Poblacion)	1.9%	1,407	1,265	▴	0.74%
030809028	Puksuan	0.9%	645	661	▾	−0.17%
030809017	Sibul	1.8%	1,283	1,084	▴	1.17%
030809018	Silahis	0.7%	510	484	▴	0.36%
030809029	Tagumpay	2.7%	2,003	1,833	▴	0.62%
030809019	Tala	2.0%	1,467	1,337	▴	0.64%
030809020	Talimundoc	3.4%	2,493	2,135	▴	1.08%
030809021	Tapulao	6.9%	5,023	4,745	▴	0.39%
030809022	Tenejero (Poblacion)	2.7%	1,968	1,706	▴	0.99%
030809023	Tugatog	9.4%	6,856	6,145	▴	0.76%
030809024	Wawa (Poblacion)	1.0%	729	763	▾	−0.32%
	Total		72,941	61,099	▴	1.23%

== Demographics ==
Population census of Orani

Year	Pop.	±% p.a.
1903	5,787	—
1918	6,381	+0.65%
1939	9,658	+1.99%
1948	12,718	+3.11%
1960	17,618	+2.75%
1970	25,740	+3.86%
1975	29,464	+2.75%
1980	33,083	+2.34%

Year	Pop.	±% p.a.
1990	43,494	+2.77%
1995	48,695	+2.14%
2000	52,501	+1.63%
2007	59,530	+1.75%
2010	61,099	+0.95%
2015	66,909	+1.75%
2020	70,342	+1.06%
2024	72,941	+0.87%

Source: Philippine Statistics Authority

In the 2024 census, Orani had a population of 72,941 people. The population density was 1,100 inhabitants per square kilometre (2,800/sq mi).

== Economy ==
Poverty incidence of Orani (%)

Source: Philippine Statistics Authority

Palay, coffee, vegetables, peanut, citrus trees and fruit trees are the major produce. Cut flowers like aster, chrysanthemum and gerbera are locally cultivated while bamboo and jungle vines can be gathered from Orani's forestlands. Aquamarine resources like milkfish, tilapia, prawn, crabs, mussels and oysters are caught in Orani's fishing grounds and fishponds.

== Government ==
=== Local government ===
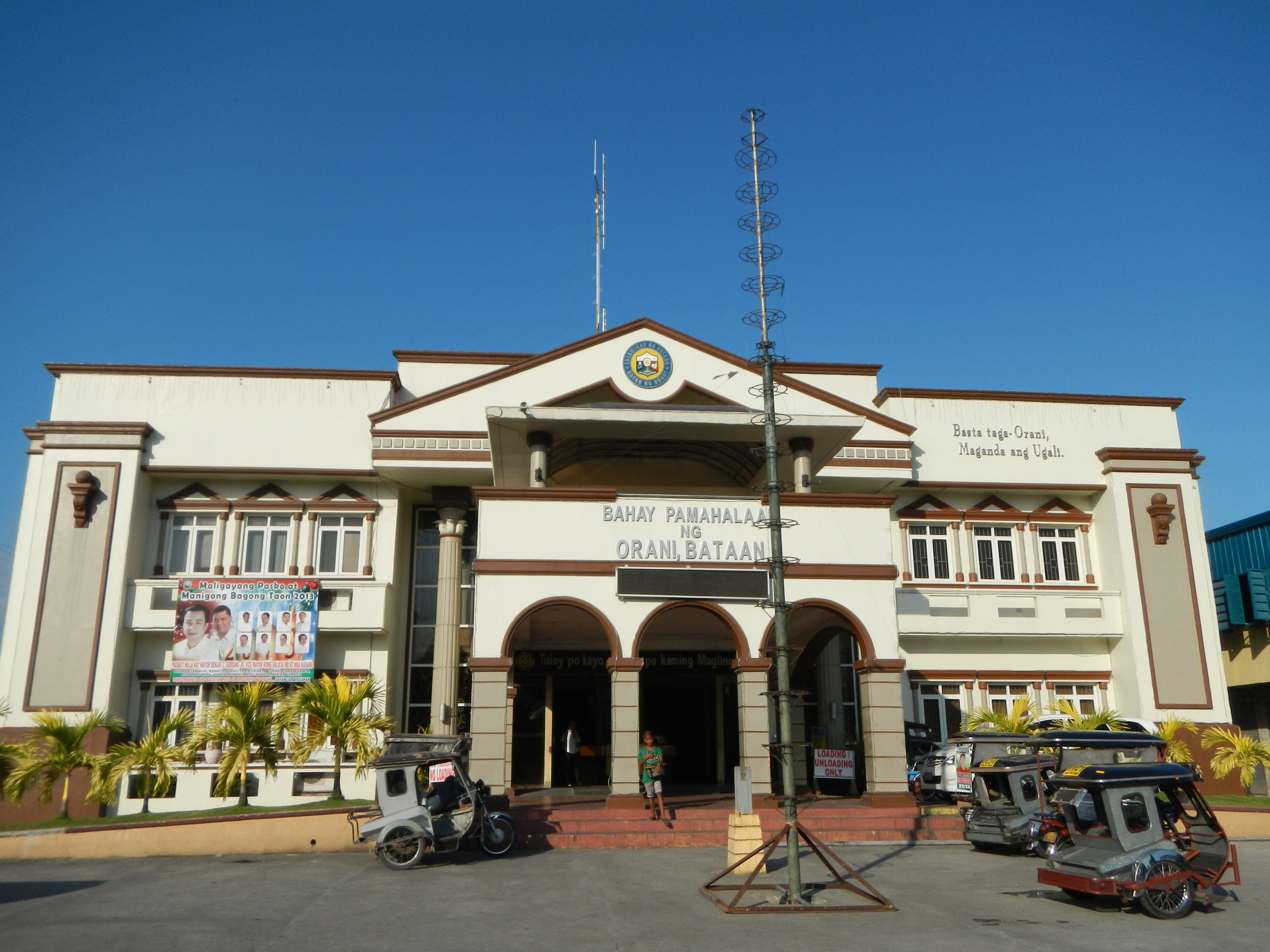
Municipal hall

Pursuant to the Local government in the Philippines", the political seat of the municipal government is located at the Municipal Hall. In the History of the Philippines (1521–1898), the Gobernadorcillo was the Chief Executive who held office in the Presidencia. During the American rule (1898–1946) (History of the Philippines (1898-1946)), the elected Mayor and local officials, including the appointed ones held office at the Municipal Hall. The legislative and executive departments perform their functions in the Sangguniang Bayan (Session Hall) and Municipal Trial Court, respectively, and are located in the Town Hall.

=== Elected officials ===
Members of the Orani Municipal Council (2022-2025)
Position	Name of official
District Representative (1st Legislative District, Bataan)	Geraldine B. Roman
Municipal Mayor	Efren Dominic E. Pascual Jr.
Municipal Vice Mayor	Emmanuel R. Roman
Municipal Councilors	Maria Abba N. Sicat
Municipal Councilors	Francis S. dela Torre
Municipal Councilors	Bonifacio F. Cruz Jr.
Municipal Councilors	Mayfair B. Sibug
Municipal Councilors	Lyndon T. Pascual
Municipal Councilors	Jun Anthony I. Reyes
Municipal Councilors	John Paul G. Apostol
Municipal Councilors	June M. Flores

Orani, Bataan's incumbent elected officials are - Mayor Efren Dominic E. Pascual, Jr. and Vice Mayor Emmanuel Bati Roman., including 8 Councilors or Sanguniang Bayan Members: Jose Gener Quiambao Pascual, Maria Abba Narciso Sicat, Francis Sevilla Dela Torre, Jun Anthony Ignacio Reyes, Mayfair Bongco Sibug, Bonifacio Francisco Cruz Jr., Renato Rodriguez Bugay, Miguel Salonga Paredes. They hold office at the second floor of the Town Hall, particularly the Office of the Mayor and Sangguniang Bayan Session Hall, respectively.

The 2nd Municipal Circuit Trial Court of Orani-Samal, MCTC Judge Ma. Cristina J. Mendoza-Pizzaro holds office in her sala located at the second floor of the MTC building at the back of the Town hall.

The municipality passed an ordinance that protects its people against discrimination based on disability, age, civil status, health status, ethnicity, religion, sexual orientation, gender identity, and expression in January 2019 - becoming the first Bataan local government unit to do so.

== Tourism ==
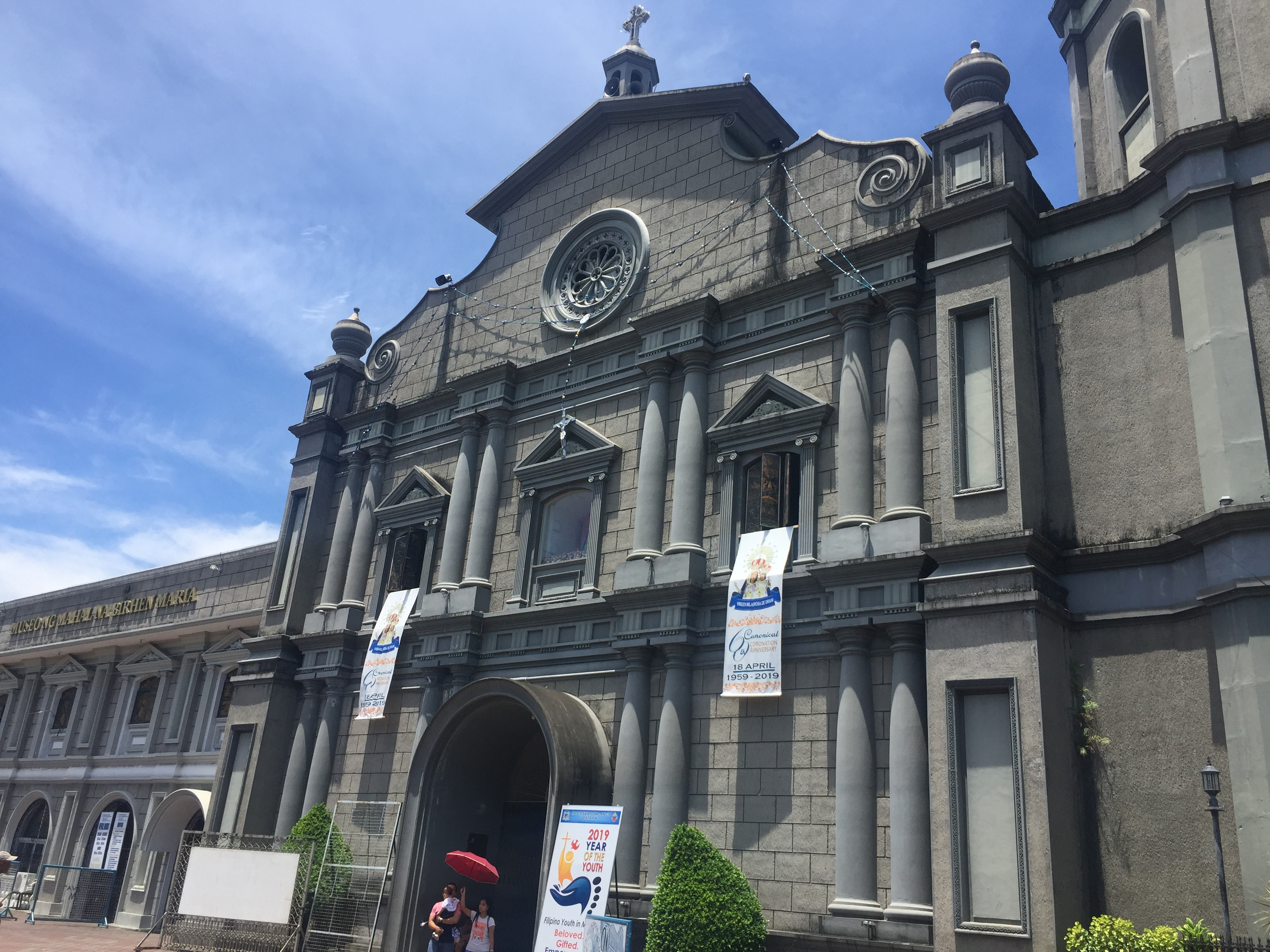
Orani Church

Orani's attractions, events and historical landmarks include:

- Orani People's Park, center of Poblacion, Plaza
- The 1714 Orani Church, commonly known as the "Our Lady of the Most Holy Rosary Parish Church of Orani" ("Our Lady of the Rosary of Orani", "Nuestra Señora del Rosario Parish Church", "Church of Orani" or "Virgen Milagrosa Del Rosario del Pueblo de Orani Shrine") is a Neoclassical (heritage) Diocesan Marian Shrine and Pilgrimage church (recognized by the 1959 Vatican's Papal Bull, located in Poblacion).
- Our Lady of Orani
- Death March Marker (Silahis), Bataan Death March. Kaparangan was used as a temporary prisoners’ camp by the Japanese soldiers starting on April 11, 1942, the second day of the infamous “Death March”. To commemorate the pitiful event, the National Historical Institute constructed a bronze memorial at the corner of Barangay Silahis and the Bataan National Road in 1987.
- Pawikan Festival

== Education ==
The Orani Schools District Office governs all educational institutions within the municipality. It oversees the management and operations of all private and public, from primary to secondary schools.

=== Primary and elementary schools ===
Elementary schools:

- Kaparangan Elementary School
- Orani United Methodist Ecumenical School
- Orani North Elementary School
- Orani South Elementary School
- Pagasa Elementary School
- Pantalan Bago Elementary School
- Pantalan Luma Elementary School
- Pulo Elementary School
- Tala Elementary School
- Talimundoc Elementary School
- Talimundoc Adventist Elementary School
- Tapulao Elementary School
- Paraiso Elementary School

Primary schools:

- Little Flower Kindergarten School
- Orani Day Care Center
- Orani North Kiddie School
- Santo Rosario Kindergarten School
- Sola Fide Montessori

=== Secondary schools ===
- Academy of East Asia for Business and Technology (formerly Academy of Queen Mary)
- BLC International School (formerly Bataan Learning Center)
- Diocesan School of Bataan - Holy Rosary Parochial Institute
- Orani United Methodist Ecumenical School

High schools:

- Jose Rizal Institute - Orani
- Orani National High School
- Orani National High School - Annex 1
- Orani National High School - Pag-Asa Annex

=== Higher educational institution ===
- Bataan Peninsula State University - Orani Campus

== Gallery ==
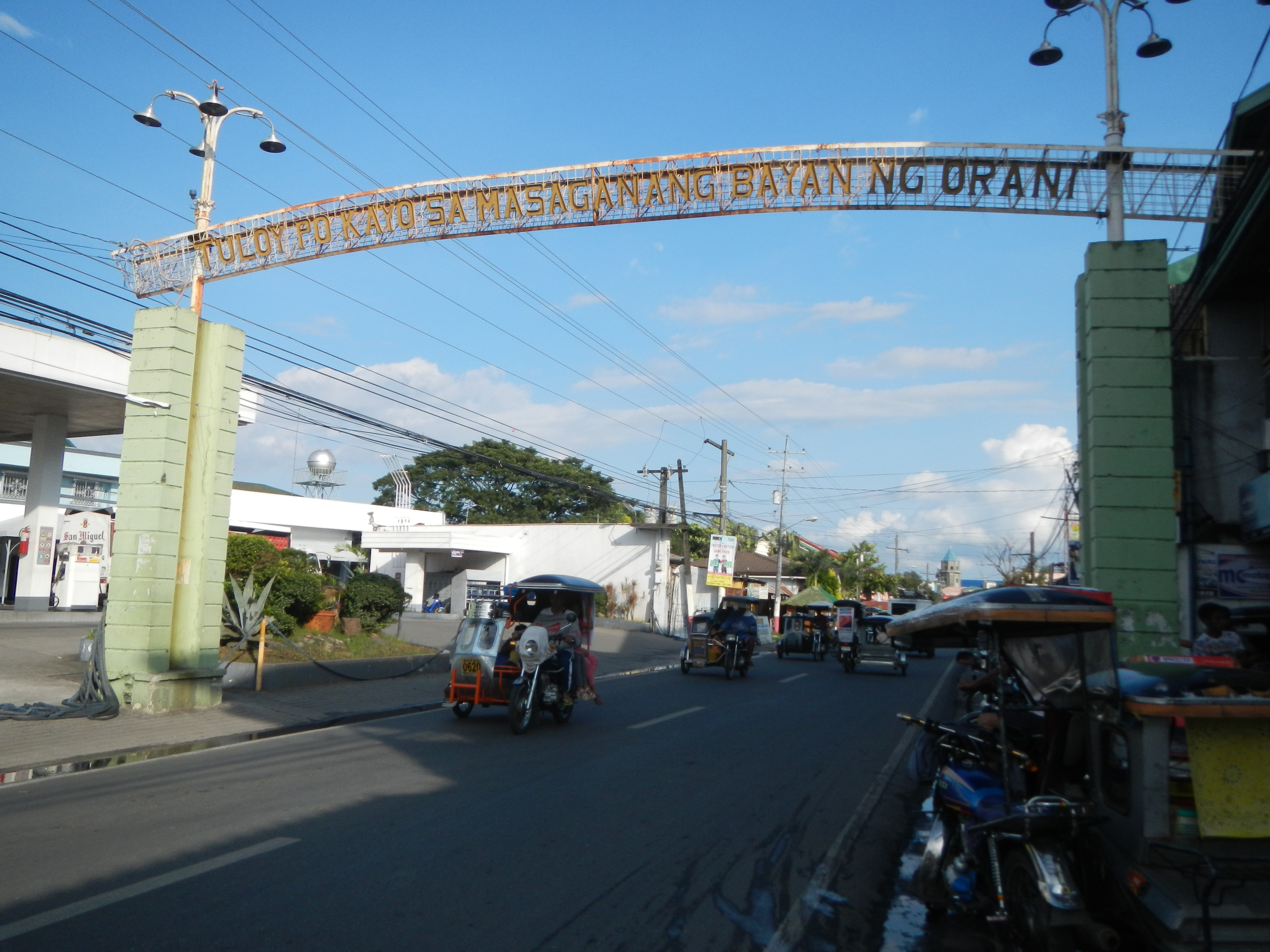
Welcome arch

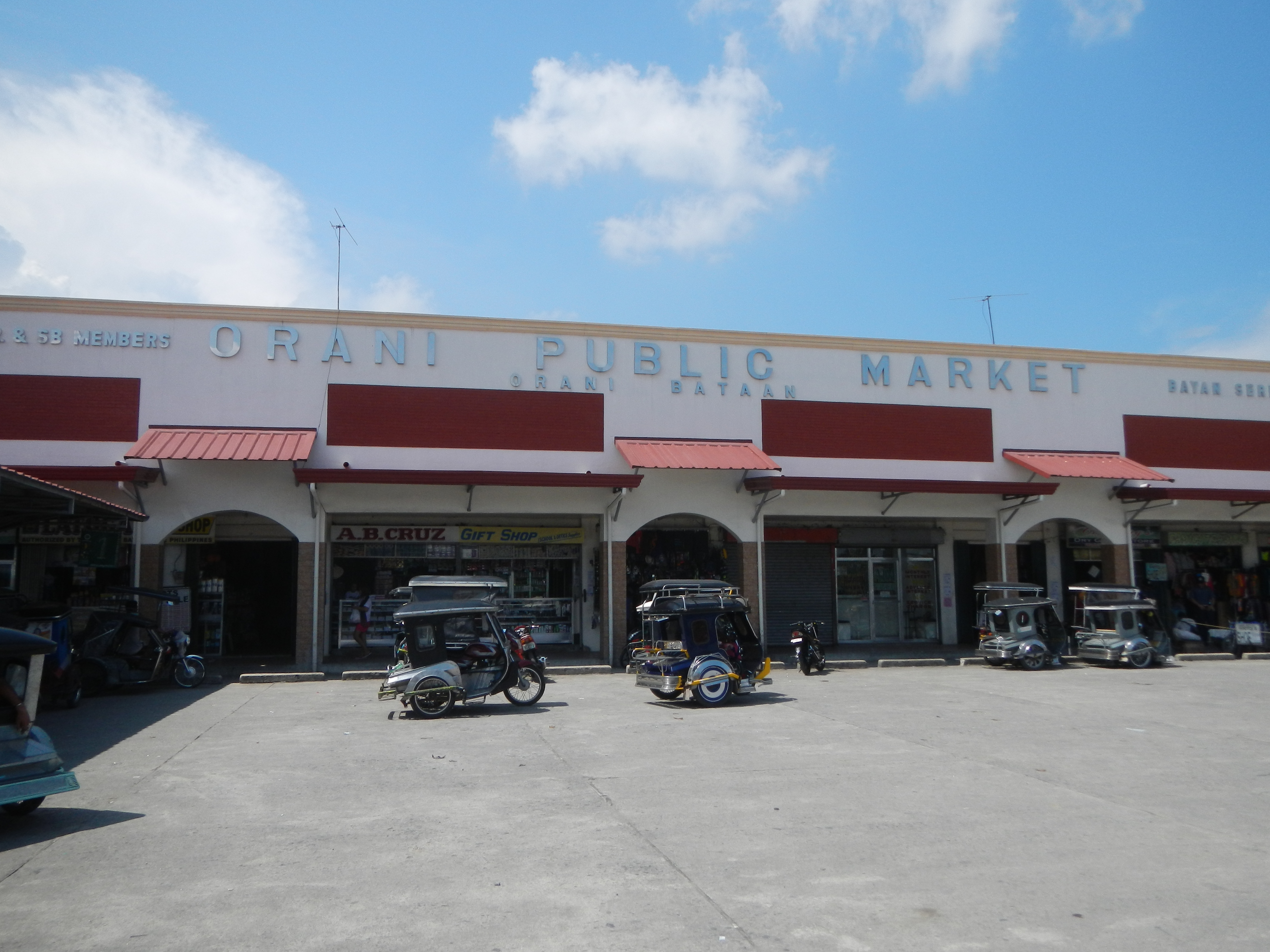
Public market

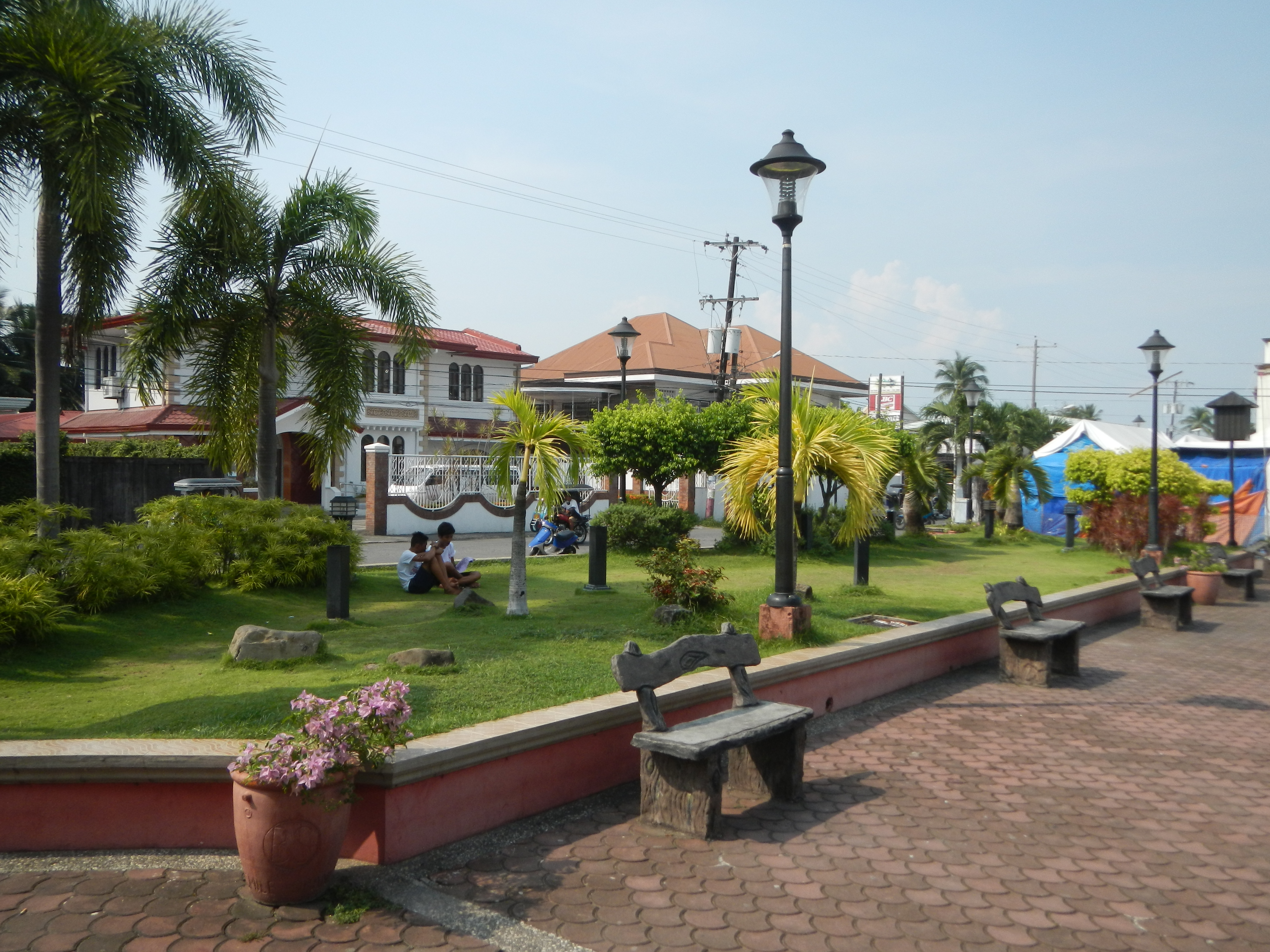
Park and plaza

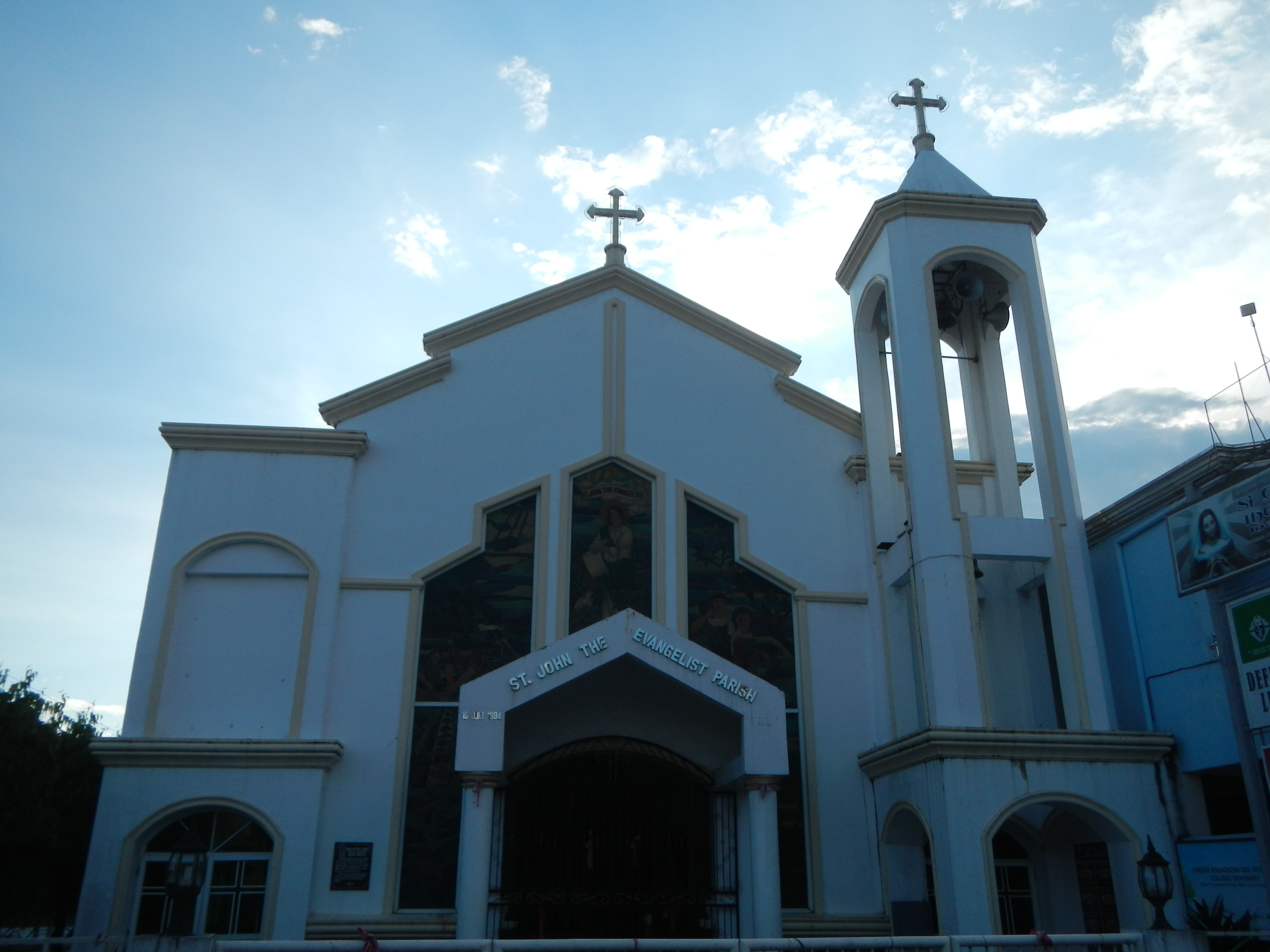
Saint John the Evangelist Parish Church

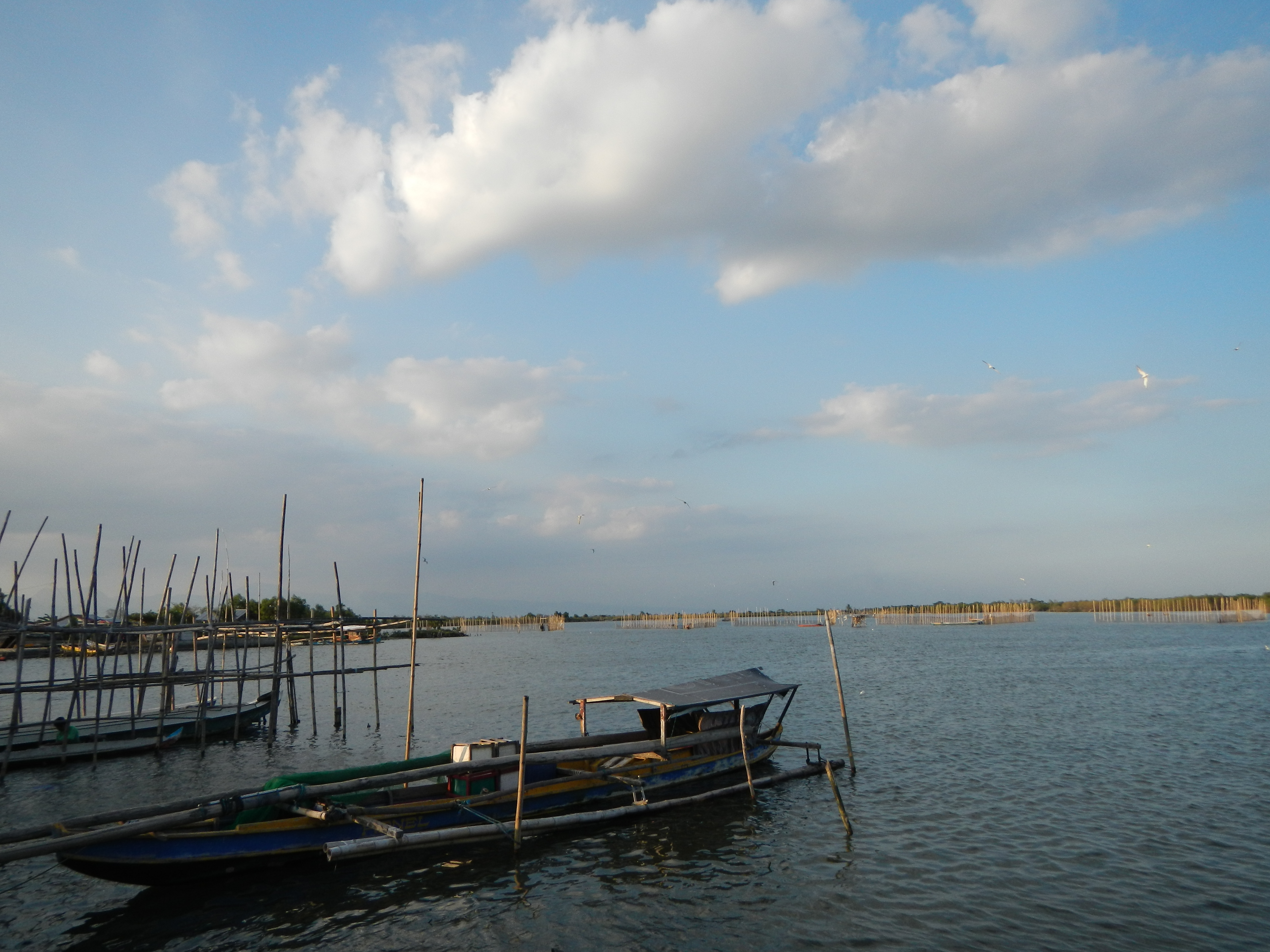
The bamboo makeshifts
