= Pilar, Bataan =

Municipality in Bataan, Philippines

Pilar
- Municipality
- Municipality of Pilar
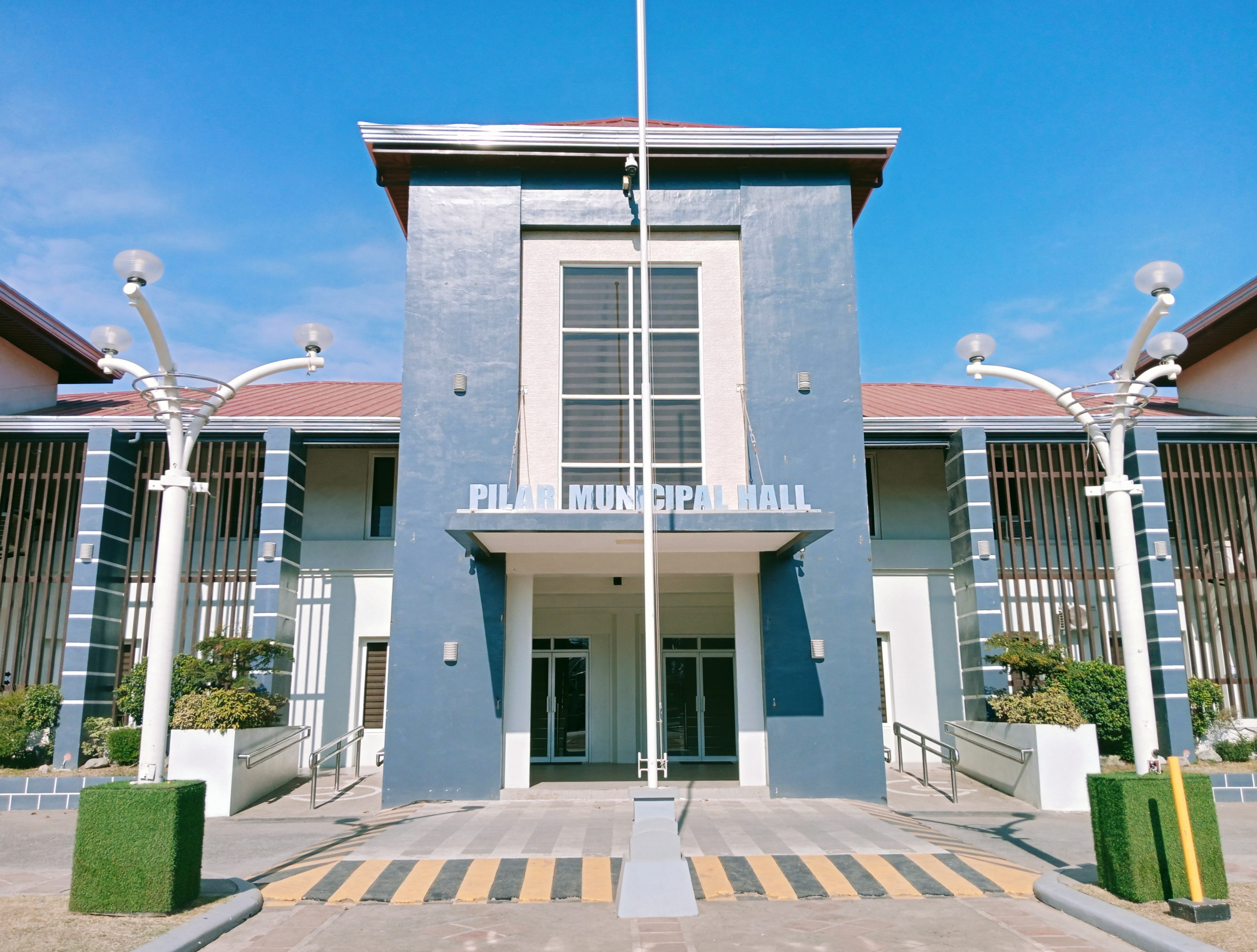
- Pilar Municipal Hall

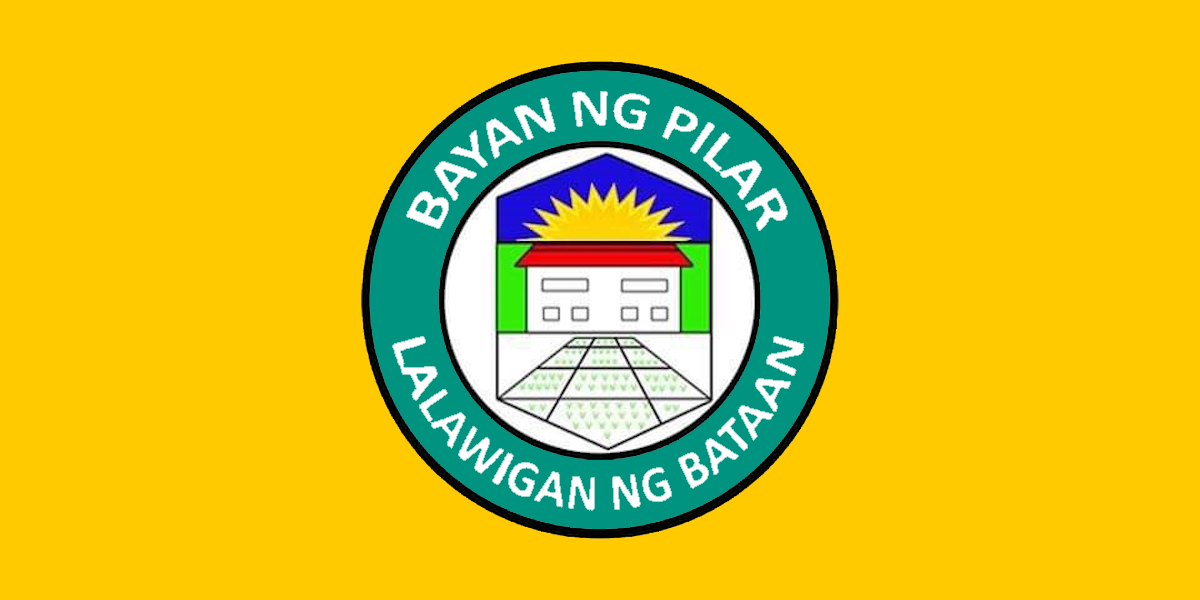
- Flag Seal

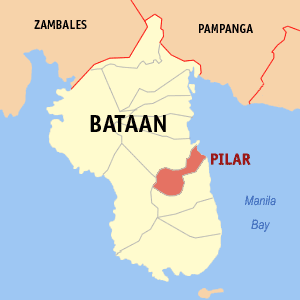
- Map of Bataan with Pilar highlighted
- Interactive map of Pilar
- Location within the Philippines
- Coordinates: 14°40′N 120°34′E
- Country: Philippines
- Region: Central Luzon
- Province: Bataan
- District: 2nd district
- Founded: April 6, 1917
- Barangays: 19 (see Barangays)

Government
  - Type: Sangguniang Bayan
  - Mayor: Carlos F. Pizarro, Jr.
  - Vice Mayor: Cecilia R. Garcia
  - Representative: Albert Raymond S. Garcia
  - Municipal Council: Members: Fatima Elisa E. Nalus; Cecilia R. Garcia; Rodelio A. Paguio; Gerry S. Sanchez; Edgardo Z. Lulu; Cipriano P. Paguio; Reno C. Gatdula; Aurea L. Iguico
  - Electorate: 29,837 voters (2025)

Area
  - Total: 37.60 km^{2} (14.52 sq mi)
- Elevation: 13 m (43 ft)
- Highest elevation: 143 m (469 ft)
- Lowest elevation: 0 m (0 ft)

Population (2024 census)
  - Total: 47,107
  - Density: 1,253/km^{2} (3,245/sq mi)
  - Households: 10,651

Economy
  - Income class: 2nd municipal income class
  - Poverty incidence: 9.53% (2023)
  - Revenue: ₱ 232.3 million (2024)
  - Assets: ₱ 683.9 million (2024)
  - Expenditure: ₱ 220.9 million (2024)
  - Liabilities: ₱ 139.1 million (2024)

Service provider
  - Electricity: Peninsula Electric Cooperative (PENELCO)
- Time zone: UTC+8 (PST)
- ZIP code: 2102
- PSGC: 0300811000
- IDD : area code: +63 (0)47
- Website: www.pilarbataan.gov.ph

Pilar, officially the Municipality of Pilar (Tagalog: Bayan ng Pilar), is a municipality in the province of Bataan, Philippines. According to the 2024 census, it has a population of 47,107 people.

== Etymology ==
The town was named in the honor of the image of the Our Lady of the Pillar, hence the town was called "Pilar".

== History ==
One of the oldest towns of Bataan, Pilar was previously part of Pampanga. Spaniards in the galleon landed in a sitio of Balanga and were greeted by the natives.

== Geography ==
Pilar is located in eastern part of Bataan Peninsula, bordering Balanga (the provincial capital) to the north, Orion to the south, Bagac to the west, and Manila Bay to the east. It is 1 kilometre (0.62 mi) from Balanga and 125 kilometres (78 mi) from Manila.

The Bataan Government Center and the historic Mount Samat National Shrine (Dambana ng Kagitingan) are both situated within the municipality in Barangays Diwa and Ala-uli, respectively.

According to the Philippine Statistics Authority, the municipality has a land area of 37.60 square kilometres (14.52 sq mi) constituting 2.74% of the 1,372.98-square-kilometre- (530.11 sq mi) total area of Bataan.

=== Climate ===
Climate data for Pilar, Bataan
Month	Jan	Feb	Mar	Apr	May	Jun	Jul	Aug	Sep	Oct	Nov	Dec	Year
Mean daily maximum °C (°F)	31 (88)	32 (90)	34 (93)	35 (95)	33 (91)	31 (88)	29 (84)	29 (84)	29 (84)	29 (84)	30 (86)	31 (88)	31 (88)
Mean daily minimum °C (°F)	19 (66)	19 (66)	20 (68)	23 (73)	25 (77)	25 (77)	24 (75)	25 (77)	25 (77)	24 (75)	23 (73)	20 (68)	23 (73)
Average precipitation mm (inches)	7 (0.3)	8 (0.3)	14 (0.6)	26 (1.0)	127 (5.0)	210 (8.3)	263 (10.4)	272 (10.7)	218 (8.6)	114 (4.5)	46 (1.8)	21 (0.8)	1,326 (52.3)
Average rainy days	4.0	4.0	6.9	11.2	21.0	24.5	27.4	26.9	25.9	21.9	13.4	6.3	193.4
Source: Meteoblue (modeled/calculated data, not measured locally)

=== Barangays ===
Pilar is politically subdivided into 19 barangays. Each barangay consists of puroks and some have sitios.

PSGC	Barangay	Population			±% p.a.	
		2024		2010		
030811001	Ala‑uli	9.5%	4,458	3,895	▴	0.94%
030811003	Bagumbayan	3.0%	1,427	1,370	▴	0.28%
030811005	Balut I	2.4%	1,151	1,259	▾	−0.62%
030811006	Balut II	2.7%	1,260	1,311	▾	−0.27%
030811007	Bantan Munti	1.0%	467	550	▾	−1.13%
030811009	Burgos	2.6%	1,227	1,166	▴	0.35%
030811011	Del Rosario (Poblacion)	3.9%	1,847	1,886	▾	−0.14%
030811012	Diwa	5.3%	2,491	2,253	▴	0.70%
030811013	Landing	2.8%	1,311	1,246	▴	0.35%
030811014	Liyang	5.0%	2,345	1,839	▴	1.70%
030811016	Nagwaling	6.4%	3,006	2,568	▴	1.10%
030811019	Panilao	11.7%	5,488	5,250	▴	0.31%
030811020	Pantingan	3.1%	1,442	1,282	▴	0.82%
030811021	Poblacion	3.0%	1,399	1,346	▴	0.27%
030811022	Rizal (Poblacion)	1.8%	847	1,082	▾	−1.68%
030811023	Santa Rosa	14.7%	6,942	6,549	▴	0.41%
030811025	Wakas North	2.4%	1,109	1,501	▾	−2.08%
030811026	Wakas South	3.4%	1,616	1,497	▴	0.53%
030811027	Wawa	4.2%	1,990	1,937	▴	0.19%
	Total		47,107	39,787	▴	1.18%

== Demographics ==
Population census of Pilar

Year	Pop.	±% p.a.
1903	3,397	—
1918	4,138	+1.32%
1939	5,346	+1.23%
1948	5,805	+0.92%
1960	9,667	+4.34%
1970	14,087	+3.83%
1975	16,699	+3.47%
1980	18,549	+2.12%

Year	Pop.	±% p.a.
1990	25,244	+3.13%
1995	28,207	+2.10%
2000	32,368	+2.99%
2007	43,213	+4.07%
2010	39,787	−2.96%
2015	41,823	+0.95%
2020	46,239	+2.14%
2024	47,107	+0.45%

Source: Philippine Statistics Authority

In the 2024 census, Pilar had a population of 47,107 people. The population density was 1,300 inhabitants per square kilometre (3,400/sq mi).

== Economy ==
Poverty incidence of Pilar (%)

Source: Philippine Statistics Authority

== Government ==
=== Local government ===
Pursuant to the Local Government Code of the Philippines", the political seat of the municipal government is located at the Municipal Hall. In the Spanish period, the Gobernadorcillo was the Chief Executive who held office in the Presidencia. During the American rule (1898–1946), the elected Mayor and local officials, including the appointed ones held office at the Municipal Hall. The legislative and executive departments perform their functions in the Sangguniang Bayan (Session Hall) and Municipal Trial Court, respectively, and are located in the Town Hall.

=== Elected officials ===
Members of the Pilar Municipal Council (2022-2025)
Position	Name of official
District Representative (2nd Legislative District, Bataan)	Jose Enrique S. Garcia III
Municipal Mayor	Alice D. Pizarro
Municipal Vice Mayor	Marino Caguimbal
Municipal Councilors	Fatima Elisa E. Nalus
Municipal Councilors	Cecilia R. Garcia
Municipal Councilors	Rodelio A. Paguio
Municipal Councilors	Gerry S. Sanchez
Municipal Councilors	Edgardo Z. Lulu
Municipal Councilors	Cipriano P. Paguio
Municipal Councilors	Reno C. Gatdula
Municipal Councilors	Aurea L. Iguico

Pilar, Bataan's elected officials are Mayor Alice D. Pizarro (National Unity) and Vice Mayor Marino Caguimbal (National Unity).

The eight Sangguniang Bayan Members led by the Vice Mayor hold office at the Pilar Sangguniang Bayan Session Hall.

== Tourism ==
Landmarks and festivals of Pilar include:

- Mount Samat Zipline — longest zipline in Luzon
- Veterans Park — located in Poblacion, Piazza Della Virgen del Pilar
- Mount Samat National Shrine — 92-metre-high (302 ft) War Memorial Cross some 555 metres (1,821 ft) above sea level.
- The Flaming Sword — located at Panilao, is a landmark depicting a hand holding a flaming sword up in the air, which symbolized the Filipino patriots' courage and gallantry as they face the adversary and threats to their democracy and freedom. The ESPADA was inaugurated on April 8, 1967.
- Dunsulan Falls
- Araw ng Kagitingan — celebrated every April 9

=== Our Lady of the Pillar Parish Church ===
The 1801 Our Lady of the Pillar Parish Church (Nuestra Señora del Pilar Parish Church, belongs to the Roman Catholic Diocese of Balanga It is under the Ecclesiastical Province of San Fernando, Pampanga.

== Education ==
The Pilar Schools District Office governs all educational institutions within the municipality. It oversees the management and operations of all private and public, from primary to secondary schools.

=== Primary and elementary schools ===
- Alauli Elementary School
- Bagumbayan Elementary School
- Balut Elementary School
- Diwa Elementary School
- J.S. Herrera Sr. Memorial Elementary School
- Jobinas Learning Center
- Liyang Elementary School
- Nagwaling Elementary School
- Northridge Montessori School of Bataan
- Panilao Elementary School
- Pantingan Elementary School
- Pilar Elementary School
- Sta. Rosa Elementary School
- Wakas Elementary School

=== Secondary schools ===
- Bataan Christian School
- Dr. Victoria B. Roman Memorial High School
- P. Roman National High School

== Notable personalities ==
- Mel Tiangco — Barangay Santa Rosa - news Anchor of GMA7
- Manuel C. Herrera — lawyer, an instructor in the University of the Philippines

== Gallery ==
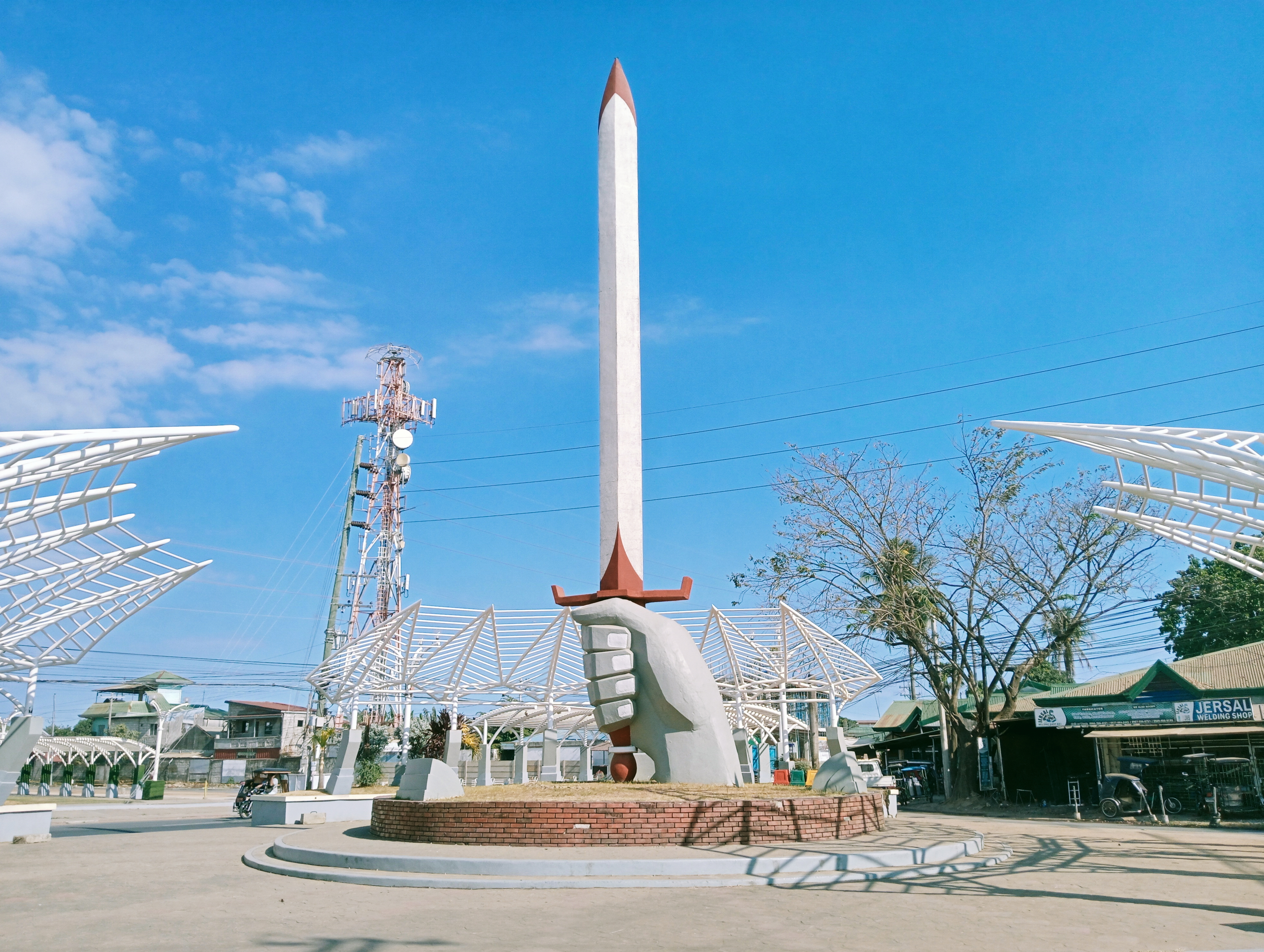
The Flaming Sword Shrine

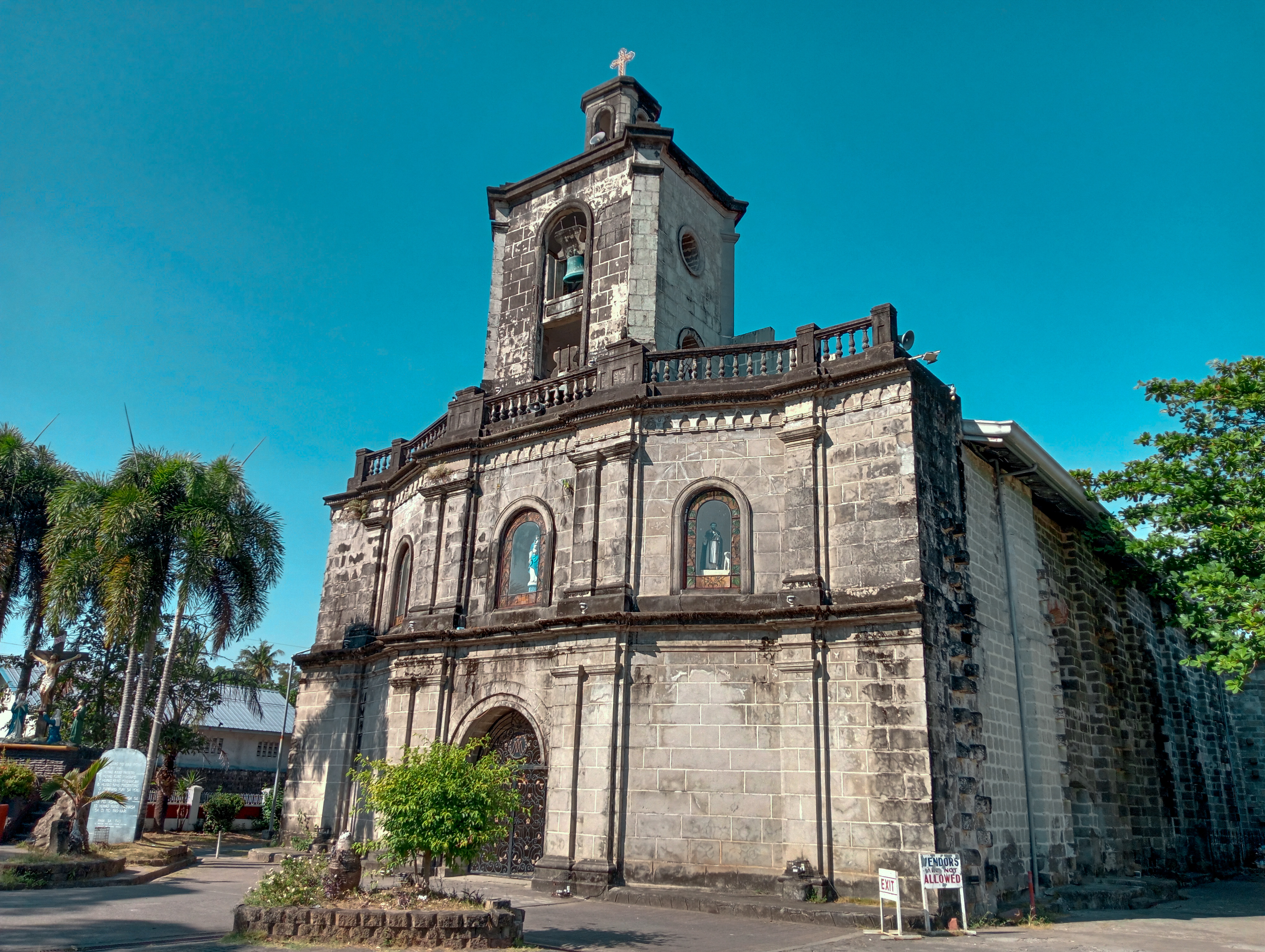
Our Lady of the Pillar Parish Church

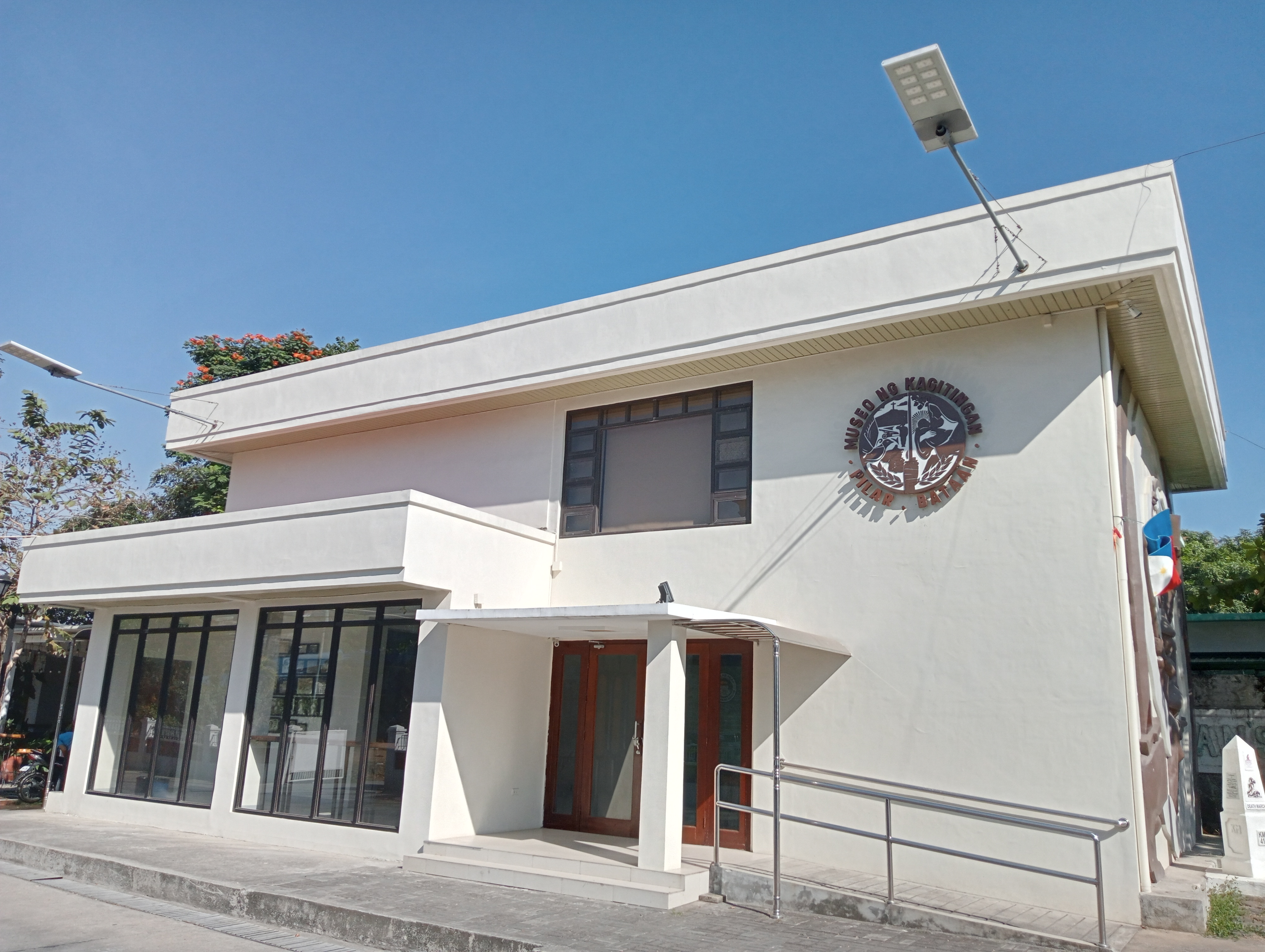
Museo ng Kagitingan

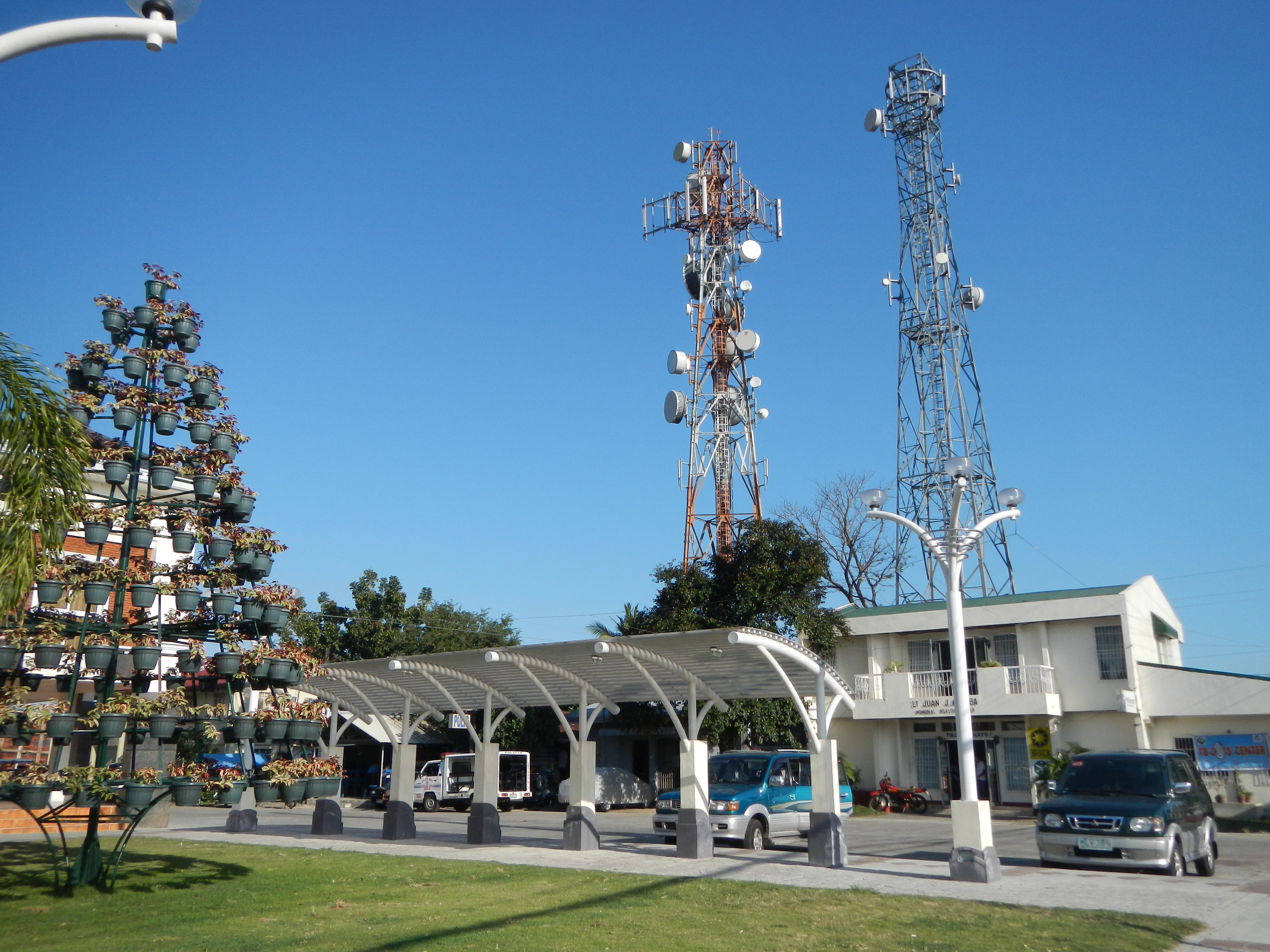
Health center

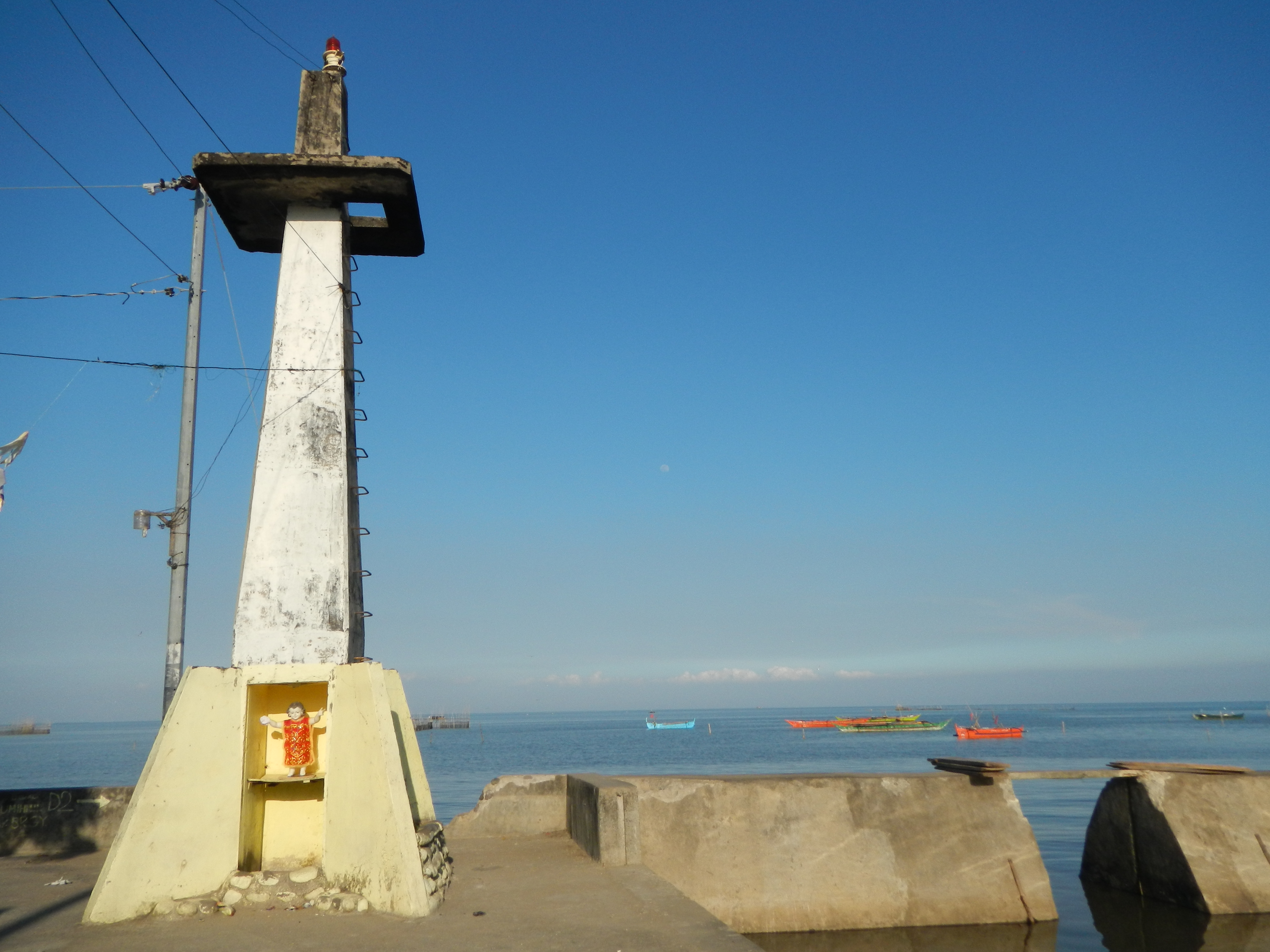
Light house

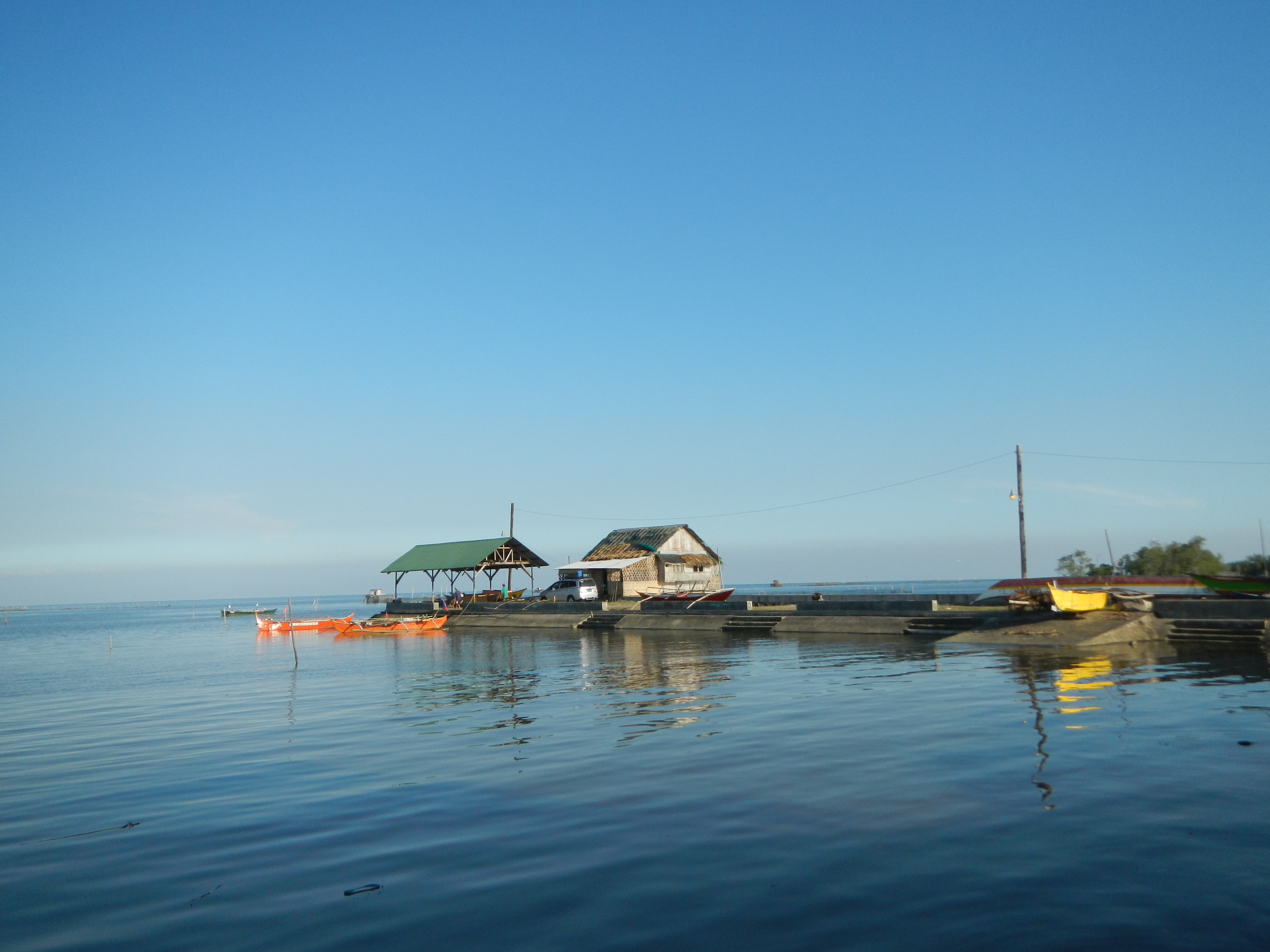
Port and bancas
