= Abucay Church =

Latin Catholic church in Bataan, Philippines

- Saint Dominic de Guzman Parish Church
- Parokya ng Santo Domingo de Guzman de Abucay (Filipino)
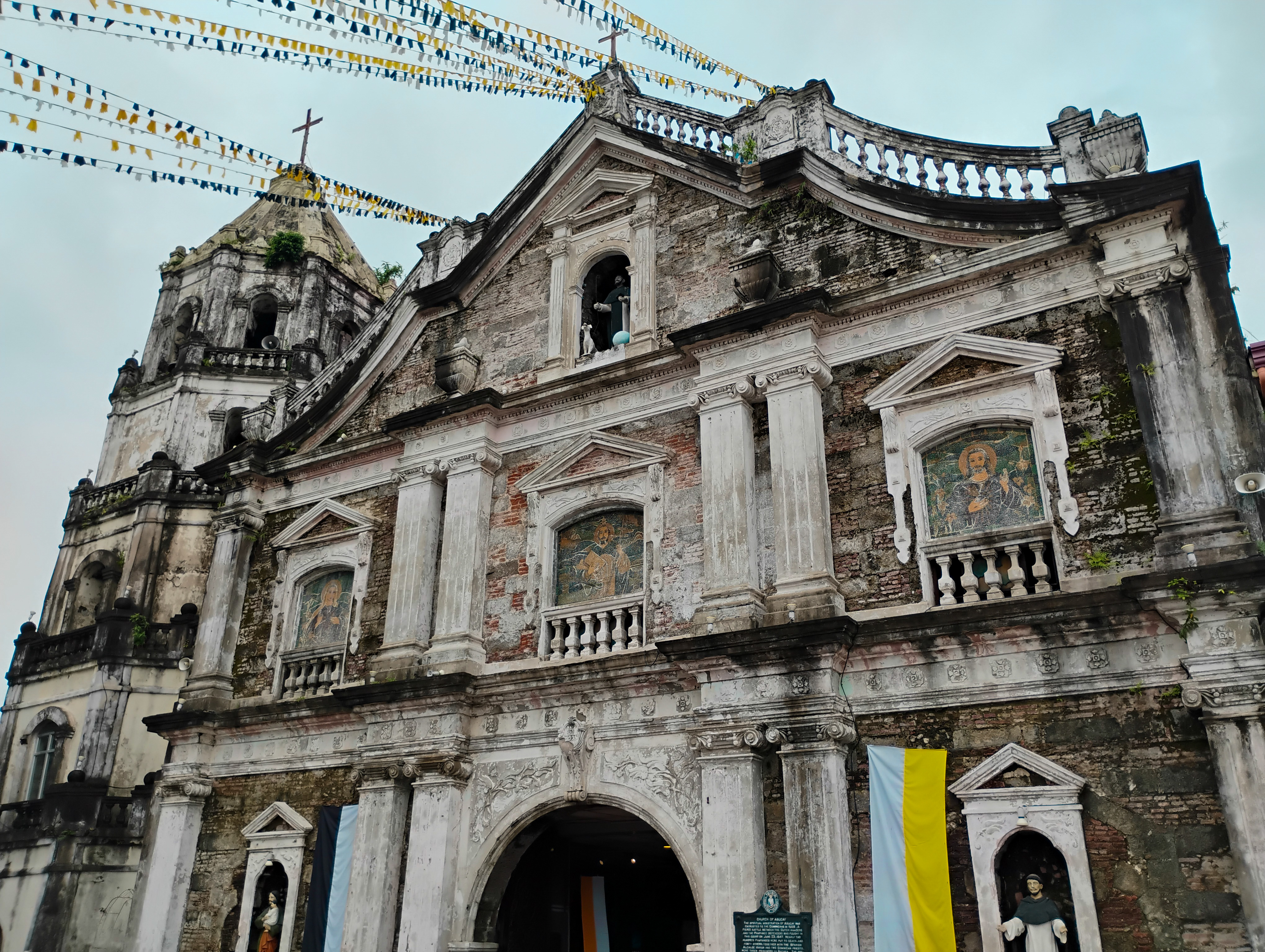
- Church facade in 2025

- Location in Luzon Location in the Philippines
- 14°43′18″N 120°32′06″E
- Location: Bataan
- Country: Philippines
- Denomination: Latin Catholic
- Website: Facebook page

History
- Status: Parish church
- Founder(s): Father Geronimo de Belen, OP
- Dedication: Saint Dominic of Guzman

Architecture
- Functional status: Active
- Architectural type: Church building
- Style: Baroque, Renaissance

Specifications
- Materials: Brick, Sand, Stone, Gravel, Cement, Steel, Concrete

Administration
- Division: Vicariate of St. Dominic De Guzman
- Province: San Fernando
- Metropolis: San Fernando
- Archdiocese: San Fernando
- Diocese: Balanga
- Parish: Saint Dominic of Guzman

Clergy
- Archbishop: Florentino G. Lavarias
- Bishop: Rufino C. Sescon, Jr.
- Priest: Fr. Milver R. Cruz

Saint Dominic de Guzman Parish Church, commonly known as Abucay Church, is a 17th-century Baroque Catholic church located at Brgy. Laon, Abucay, Bataan, Philippines. The parish church, established in 1587 and administered by the Dominican Missionary Friars in 1588, is dedicated to Saint Dominic of Guzman. The parish is under the jurisdiction of the Diocese of Balanga. Since June 5, 2023, its parish priest is Fr. Milver R. Cruz.

The church housed one of the earliest printing presses in the Philippines, established in 1608 by Father Francisco Blancas de San Jose, O.P. and Tomas Pinpin who used the facility to print books in Spanish and Tagalog. The church was also a witness to the massacre of hundreds of Filipinos and Spaniards by the Dutch Invaders on June 23, 1647. These pieces of the church's history were inscribed on a historical marker installed by the National Historical Committee (now the National Historical Commission of the Philippines) in 1939.

== History ==
=== Parish church history ===
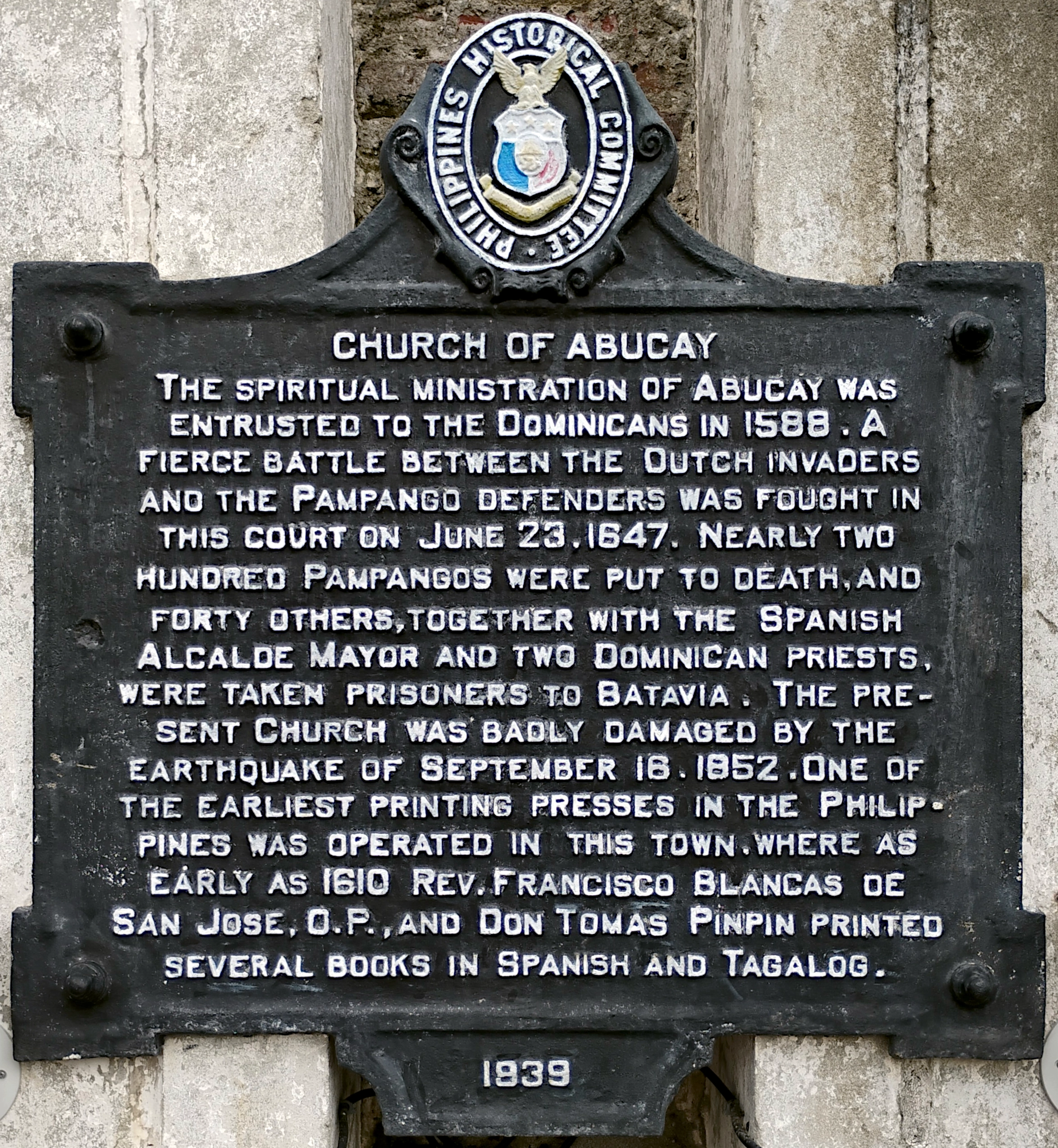
Church PHC historical marker installed in 1939

The church structure was erected by Father Geronimo de Belen in the early 1600s after the establishment of the Dominican mission in Abucay on June 10, 1588. On June 23, 1647, the Dutch Naval Forces who invaded Manila and its neighboring provinces massacred hundreds of Kapampangans and Spanish officials and priests in the church complex, while others were taken to Batavia, a former Dutch colony. The current church was significantly damaged by an earthquake on September 16, 1852. Major changes were made into the structure before the Second World War, as stated in a medallion placed on top of the church's main portal with the inscription "Mayo de 1925 ".

=== Abucay Printing Press ===
The Spanish religious missionaries to the Philippines did not bring with them equipment for mass production of books and manuscripts. Instead, they employed the knowledge of the Chinese in the country to construct the first printing press. This first printing press used xylography, a type of relief printing technique with letters or characters etched on blocks of wood. One of the first books printed in the country using the technique is the Doctrina Christiana, a catechetical book meant to educate the local population on the Christianity, with hymns and prayers written in the local language (Tagalog) and script (Baybayin). Texts produced with the press from 1593 to 1610 used the local language and writing system but by 1604, the Spanish started printing using movable type with Roman letters. Father Francisco Blancas de San Jose, a Dominican Friar was a key figure in this shift from local to Romanized text. By 1608, the printing press which used to be in Manila, was transferred to Abucay in Bataan province. Filipinos replaced the Chinese men as workers in the printing press. Tomas Pinpin, a local of Abucay, is recognized as the first Filipino printer. Among Pinpin's publications was a manual teaching Tagalog speakers the Spanish language. This manual was printed by Diego Talaghay (believed to be his assistant) when Pinpin was appointed as shop manager.

== Architecture ==
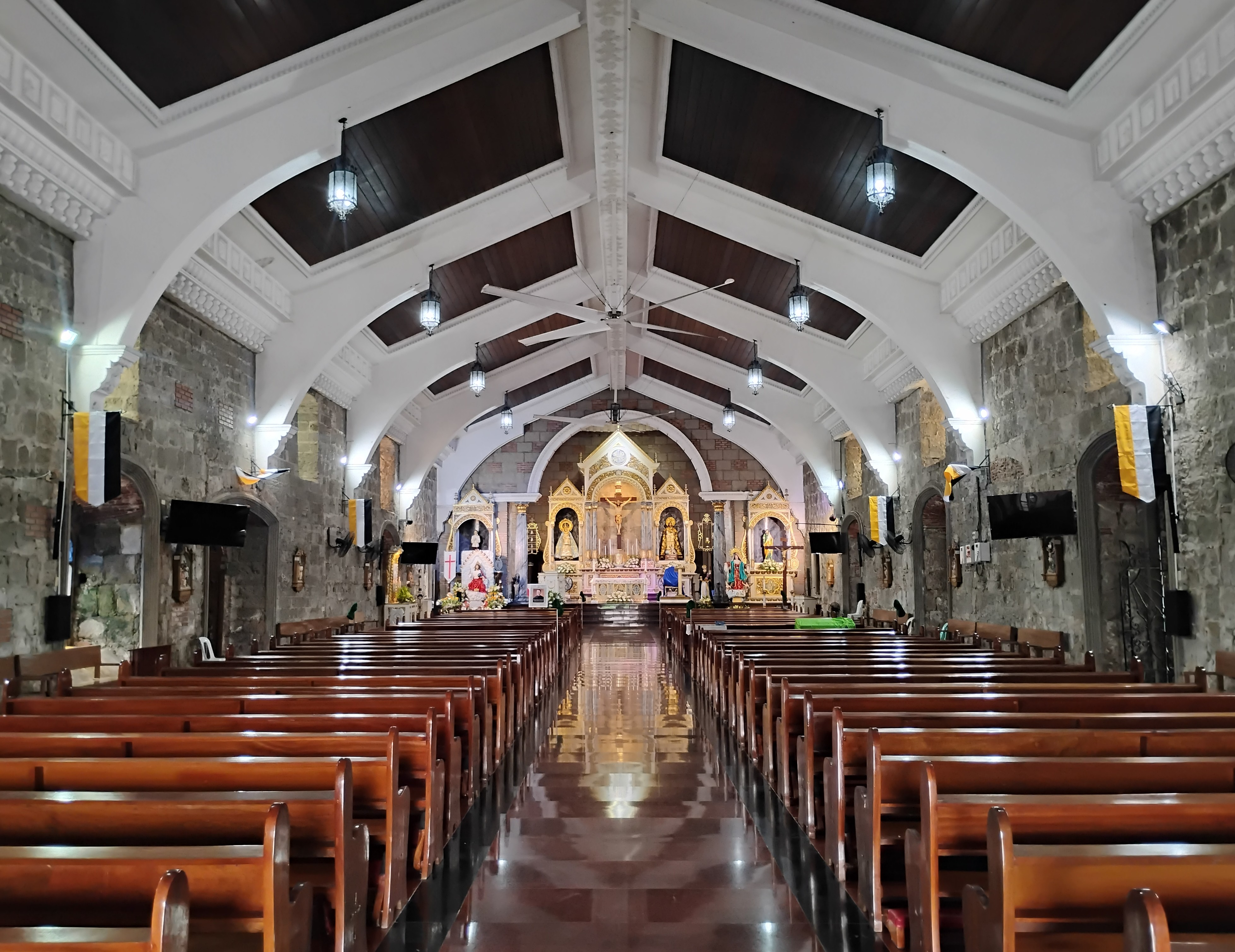
Church interior in 2025

The two-level facade of the church is described as of Renaissance style. Its expanse is divided vertically by single or coupled Doric columns. The two saints' niches flanking the main portal, three fenestrations on the second level, and the saint's niche on the center of the pediment are all topped by triangular pediments, each with a pair of decorative brackets to support it. Four urn-like finials top the second-level cornice. The triangular pediment, with its top lined with balusters, undulates down to its base. To the right of the church rises the five-tiered bell tower, with each of its storey defined by decorative balusters and ornamented with semicircular arched windows.

== See also ==
- Education in the Philippines during Spanish rule
- Catholic Church in the Philippines
- Diocese of Balanga
- Balanga Cathedral
