= Bataan Peninsula State University =

Public university in Bataan, Philippines

- Pamantasang Pampamahalaan ng Tangway ng Bataan (Filipino)
- Traversing a Culture of Innovation
- Former name: Bataan Polytechnic State College
- Motto: Qualitas Excelencia (Latin)
- Motto in English: Quality Excellence
- Type: State university
- Established: 1953; 73 years ago
- Academic affiliations: AACCUP
- President: Ruby B. Santos-Matibag (Elected 2023)
- Vice-president: List: Rev. Fr. Edgardo S. Sigua (VP for Academic Affairs); Monica T. Hipolito, MAEd (VP for Research, Extension & Training Services); Joerald M. Gadia, MAPhilo (VP for Administration and Finance Services)
- Director: List: Adrian C. Perdio, MAEd (Director Main campus); Walter G. Valdez (Director Abucay campus); Sisenando C. Masangcap Jr., MBA (Director Balanga campus); Glenda D. Abad (Director Dinalupihan campus); Digna M. De Guzman, MPA/MSW (Director Orani Campus)
- Location: Capitol Compound, Balanga, Bataan, Philippines; 14°40′37″N 120°31′43″E
- Campus: Urban Main campus: Balanga Satellite campuses: Abucay; Bagac; Dinalupihan; Orani
- Newspaper: The Guilds
- Colors: Maroon and Gold
- Website: www.bpsu.edu.ph
- Location in Luzon Location in the Philippines

Bataan Peninsula State University (BPSU; Filipino: Pamantasang Pampamahalaan ng Tangway ng Bataan) is a state university in the province of Bataan, Philippines. Its main campus is located in Balanga, with satellite campuses in Abucay, Bagac, Dinalupihan, and Orani.

== History ==
Before the conversion, BPSU had three campuses; two were located in the City of Balanga while the third was situated in Orani, Bataan. The passage of RA 9403 resulted in the expansion of BPSU's campuses as the Act integrated the Bataan State College in Dinalupihan and its satellite campus in Abucay.

The Bataan Peninsula State University was established by Republic Act 9403 which was signed into law on 22 March 2007.

In June 2008, the university made education more accessible to the residents of the towns of Bagac and Morong by establishing an extension in the Municipality of Bagac. The extension offers courses like BS Entrepreneurship, BS Hotel and Restaurant Management, first two years of Nursing, and General Engineering courses. In December 20, 2023, President Ferdinand "Bongbong" Marcos Jr. signed the Republic Act 11969 officially elevating Bagac as BPSU's sixth campus.

The university has three programs granted with Level 1 Accreditation from AACCUP. Fifty-six programs are scheduled for accreditation from 2008 to 2012.

== Campuses and locations ==
- Capitol Compound (Main campus)
- Abucay Campus
- Balanga Campus
- Dinalupihan Campus
- Orani Campus
- Bagac Campus
- Morong, Bataan - soon to rise
- Mariveles - no plan yet

== Gallery ==
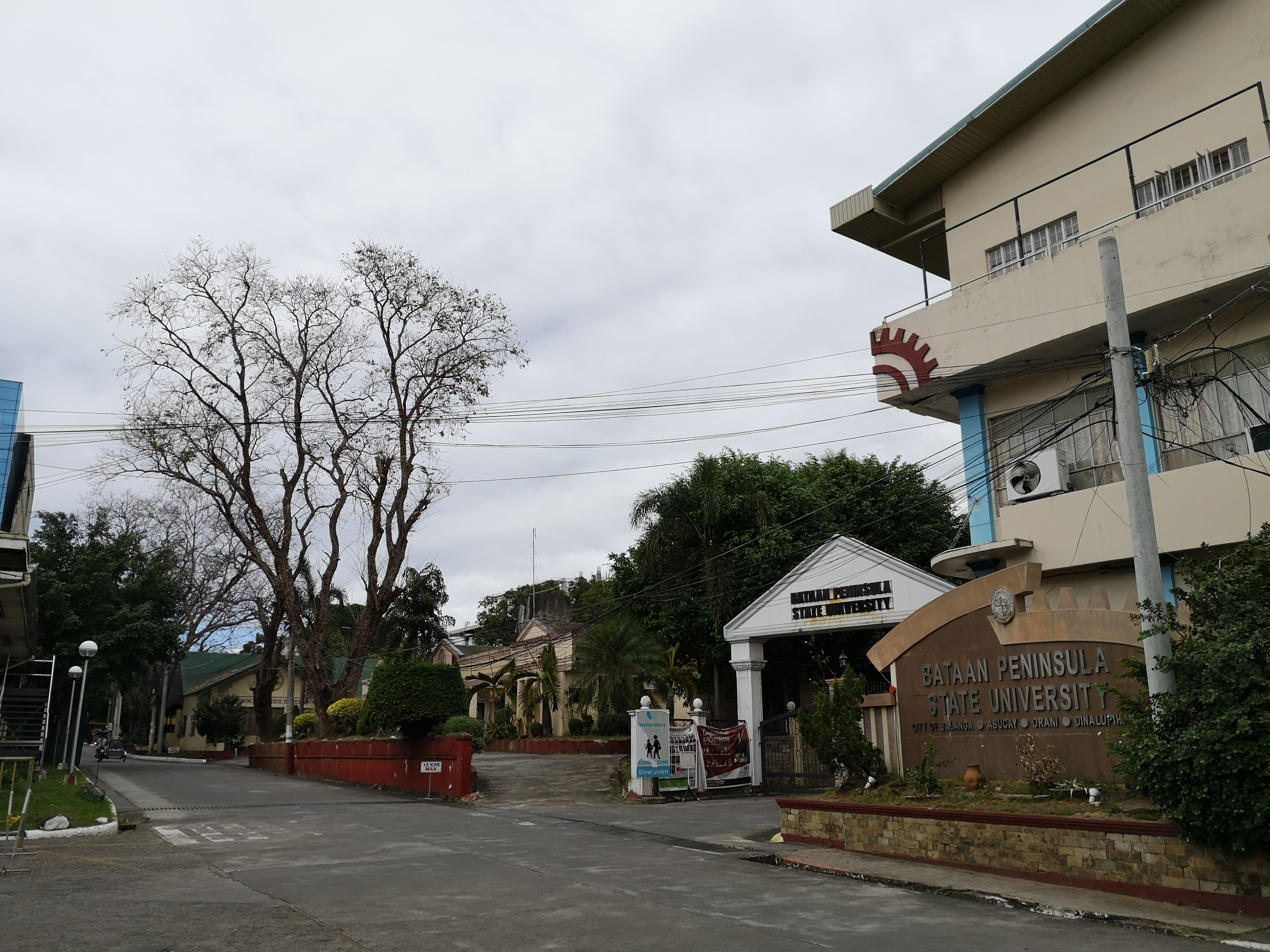
The Bell is a landmark at BPSU Main Campus - located in front of ESF-Medina Lacson Building

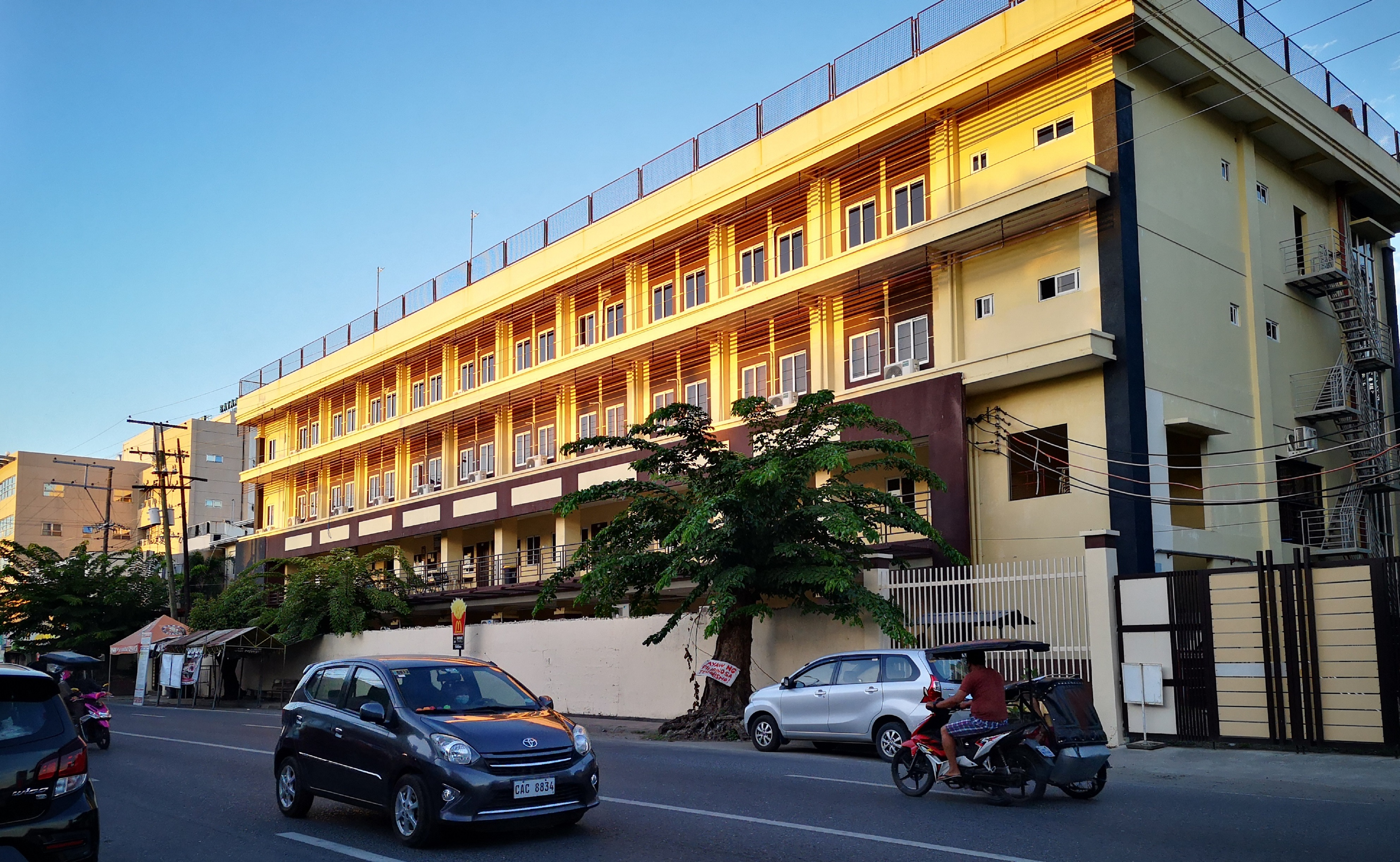
BPSU Balanga Campus along Don Manuel Banzon Avenue

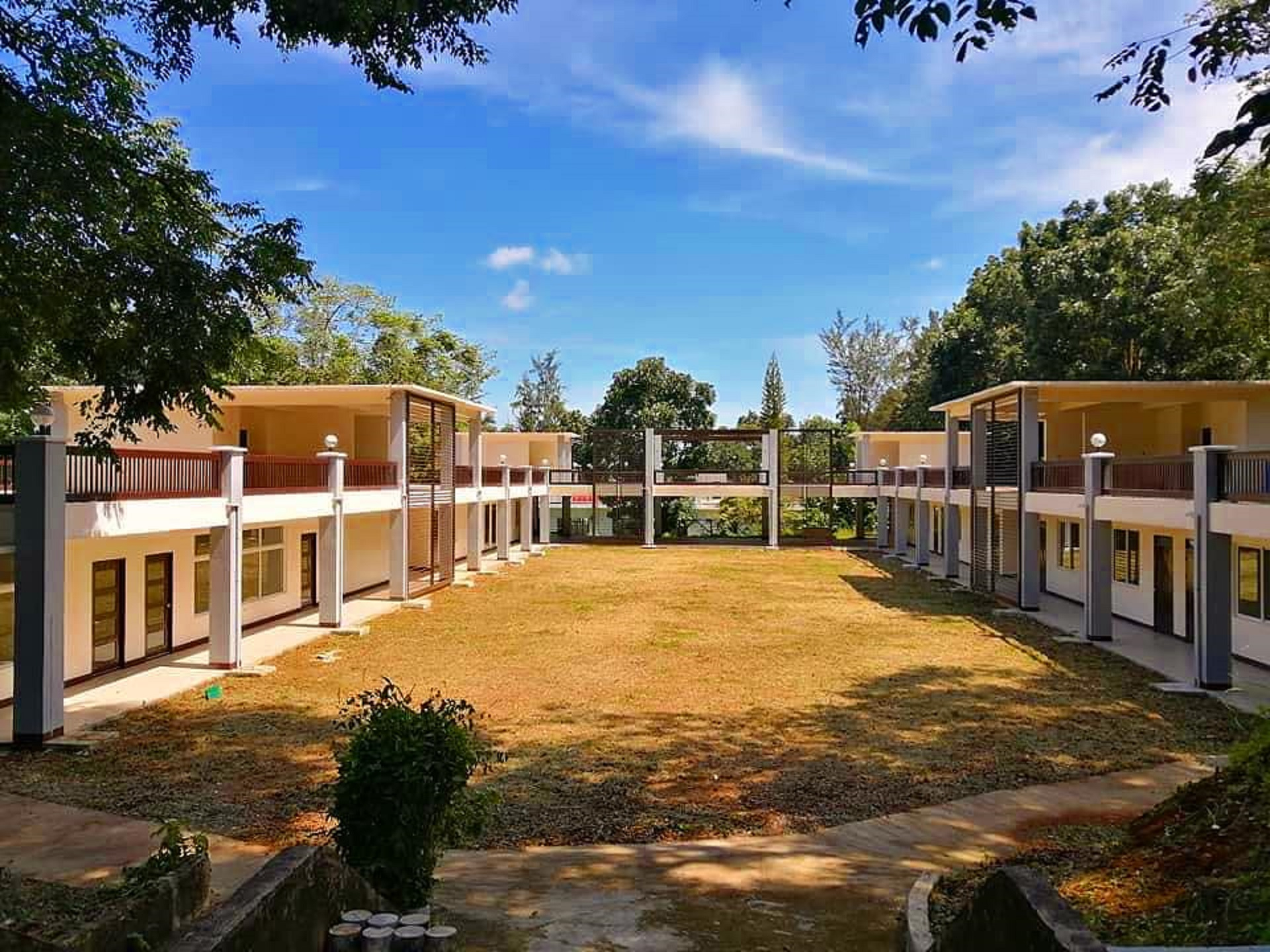
BPSU Abucay Campus Agriculture Engineering Building

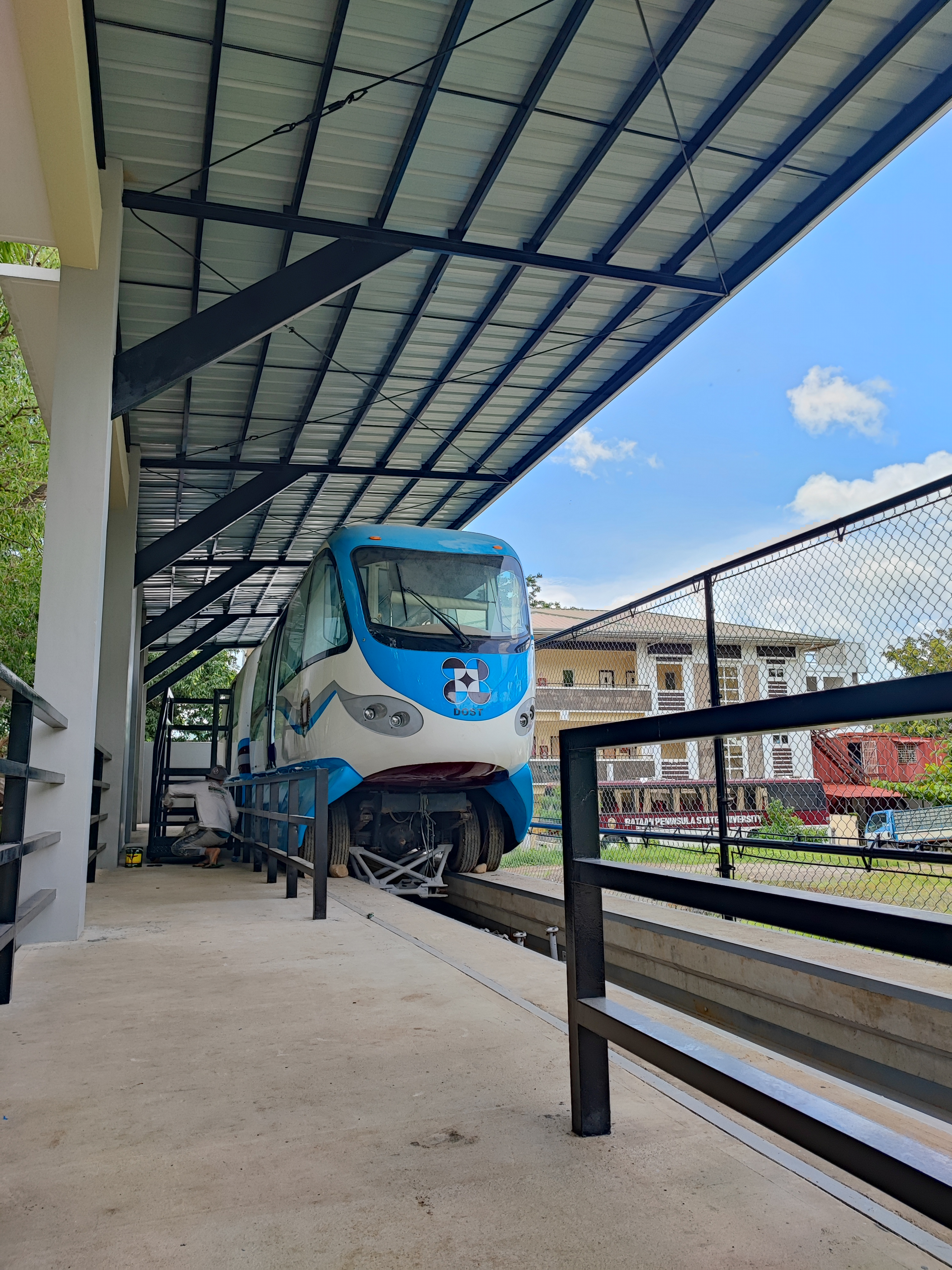
Automated Guideway Transit prototype in Bataan Peninsula State University Main Campus

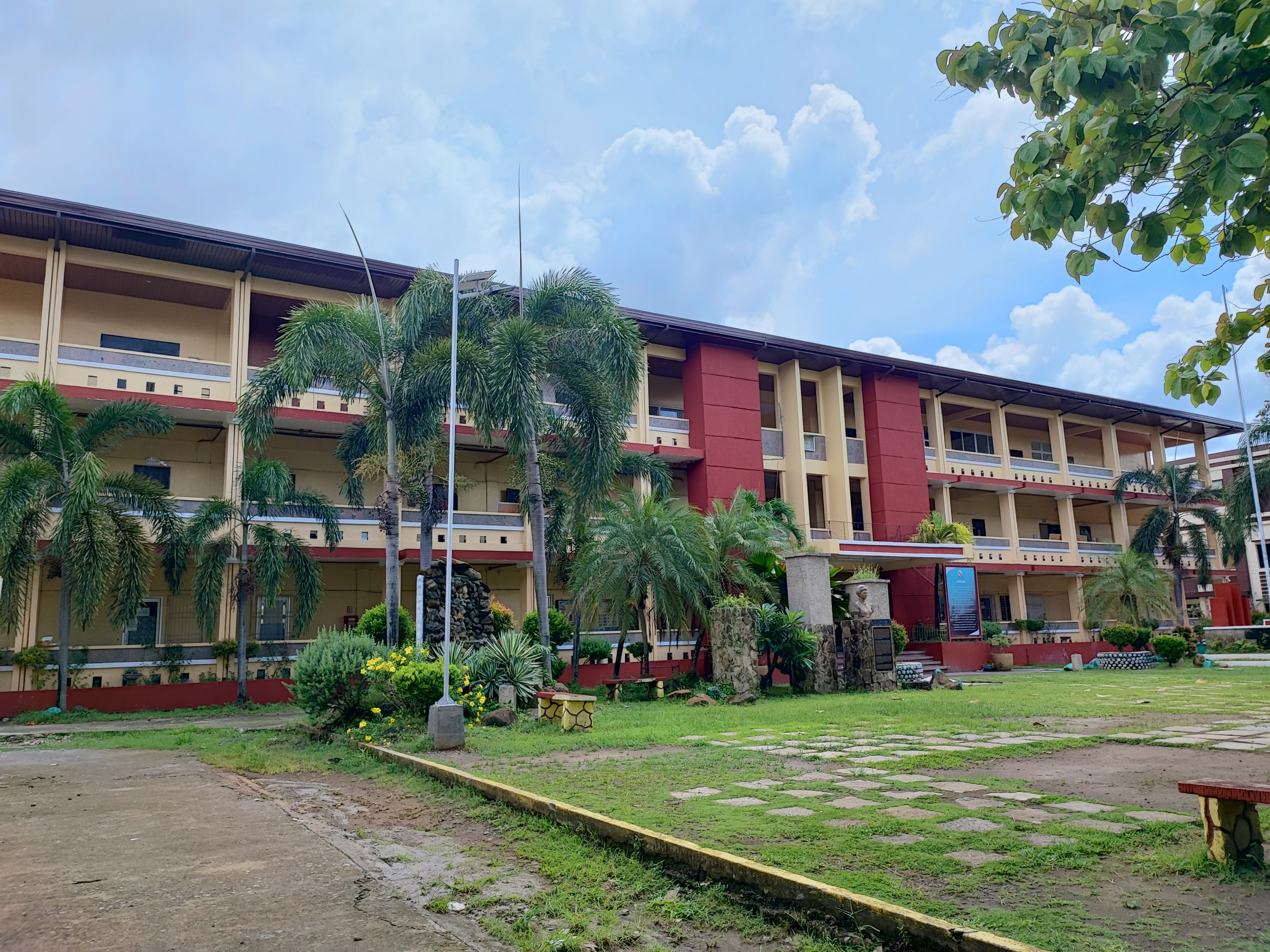
Medina Lacson De Leon Building in Bataan Peninsula State University Main Campus

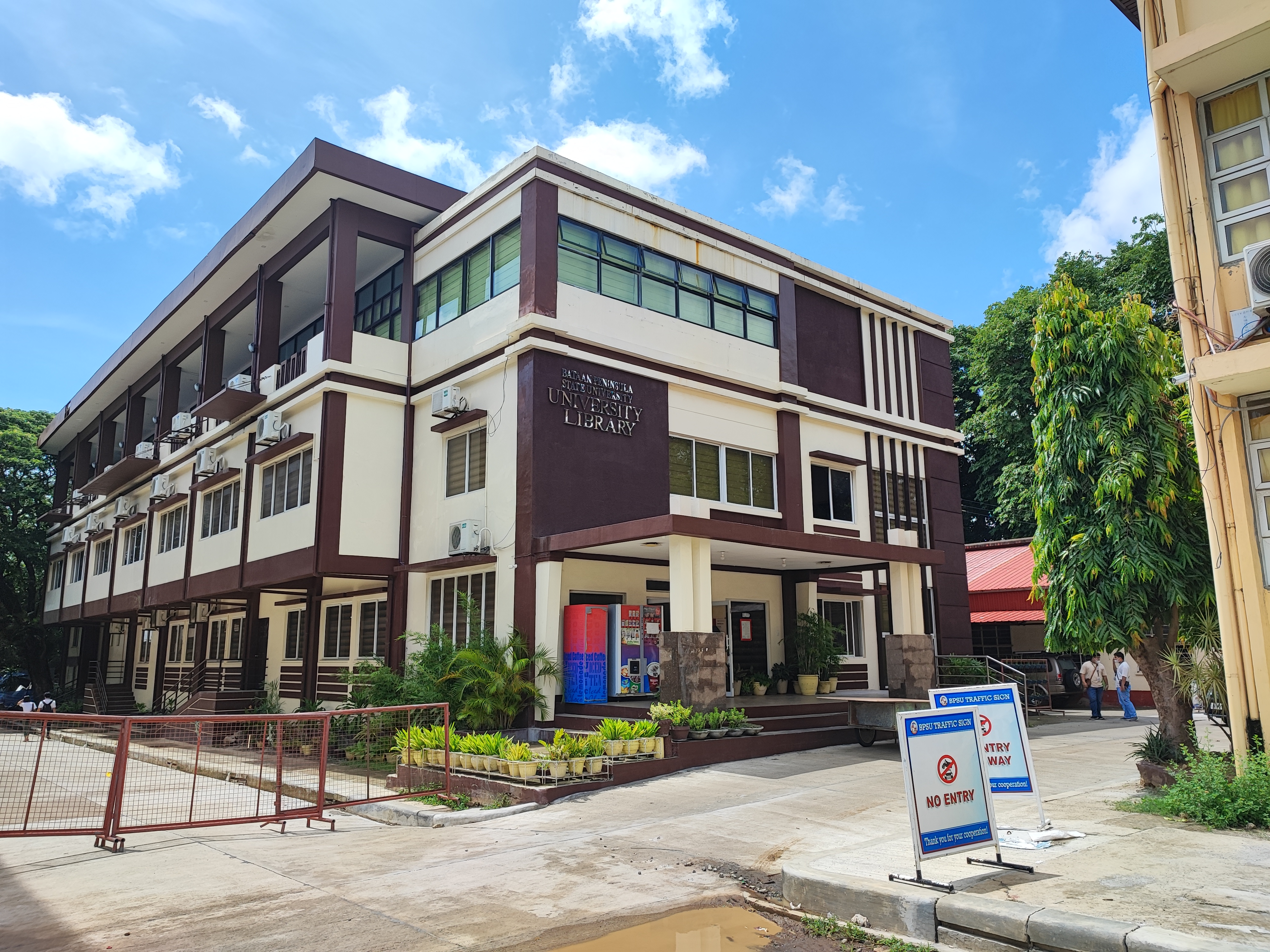
Bataan Peninsula State University Main Campus Library
