= St. John's Academy of Bataan =

Roman Catholic school in Bataan, Philippines

St. John's Academy

Location
- Rizal Street, Dinalupihan, Bataan; Philippines
- Coordinates: 14°52′05″N 120°28′03″E

Information
- Other name: St. John's Academy Inc. SJAI
- Former name: Saint John Academy (1960-2019)
- Type: Parochial School
- Motto: Adveniat Regnum Tuum (Thy Kingdom Come)
- Religious affiliation(s): Roman Catholic, DSOB, CEAP
- Established: June 1960
- Founder: Florentino F. Guiao
- Principal: Gemma R. Yao
- Color(s): Red and gray
- Nickname: Johannines
- Website: sja-bataan.edu.ph

St. John's Academy Inc., formerly known as Saint John Academy, is a private Roman Catholic secondary school in Dinalupihan, Bataan, Philippines. It supplied volunteers for the Parochial catechetical program at the public schools within the parish. The school is a member of the Diocesan Schools of Bataan (DSOB) and the Catholic Educational Association of the Philippines (CEAP).

== History ==
New parish priest Florentino F. Guiao founded Saint John Academy in June 1960 to provide Christian education. It was recognized as a government-mandated private school.

Religious institutions such as the Student Catholic Action, Children of Mary and Legion of Mary were established, as was a catechetical program whereby the school's junior and senior students taught Catholicism in the elementary schools of the parish.
