= Roosevelt Protected Landscape =

Protected area in Central Luzon, Philippines

- Roosevelt Park
- IUCN category V (protected landscape/seascape)
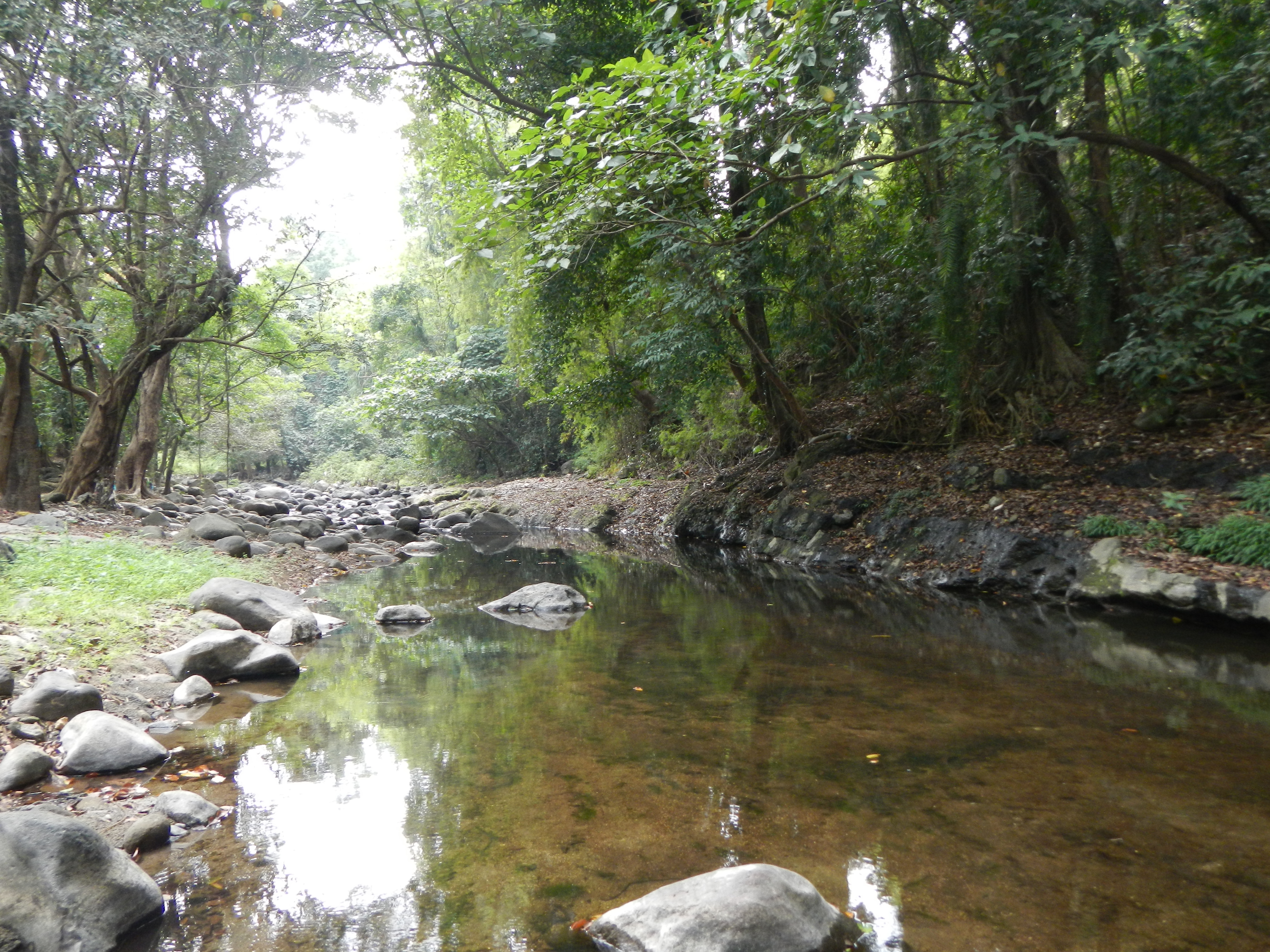
- The protected landscape area of Roosevelt in Dinalupihan

- Location within Luzon Location within Philippines
- Location: Bataan, Philippines
- Nearest city: Olongapo
- Coordinates: 14°51′11″N 120°16′57″E
- Area: 786.04 hectares (1,942.3 acres)
- Established: March 30, 1933 (National park); April 23, 2000 (Protected landscape)
- Governing body: Department of Environment and Natural Resources

The Roosevelt Protected Landscape, also known as Roosevelt Park, is a protected area in the Central Luzon region in the Philippines. It occupies an area of 786.04 hectares (1,942.3 acres) of grasslands and old-growth forest in northern Bataan province near Olongapo and the Subic Bay Freeport Zone. The park was established as Roosevelt National Park covering an area of 1,485 hectares (3,670 acres) on March 30, 1933, through Proclamation No. 567 signed by Governor-General Theodore Roosevelt Jr. In 1965, the national park was reduced to 1,334 hectares (3,300 acres). On April 23, 2000, the park was reclassified as a protected landscape area and was further reduced to its present area of 786.04 hectares (1,942.3 acres).

== Location ==
The Roosevelt Protected Landscape area sits on a narrow valley at the foot of Mount Santa Rita and Mount Malasimbo in the Zambales Mountain Range at the border between the municipalities of Dinalupihan and Hermosa in Bataan. It spans the Dinalupihan villages of Roosevelt and Payangan, and the Hermosa village of Tipo just 15 kilometres (9.3 mi) east of Subic Bay near the boundary with the city of Olongapo. Subic–Clark–Tarlac Expressway (SCTEx) and Jose Abad Santos Avenue (also known as Olongapo–Gapan Road) traverse the southern part of the protected area with the Tipo Toll Barrier that connects SCTEx to the Subic Freeport Expressway close to park's southwestern edge.

== Topography and ecology ==
The park is bisected by several streams, including the Cucubog and Olongi rivers. It is composed of 87% grassland dominated by cogon and talahib, and 13% remnants of old growth forest and mahogany and teak plantations. The park is a habitat for several endangered species and game animals which include pythons, monitor lizards, cloud rats, quails, kingfishers, flycatchers and fruit bats.

== See also ==
- Bataan National Park
