= Dinalupihan =

Municipality in Bataan, Philippines

- Municipality
- Municipality of Dinalupihan
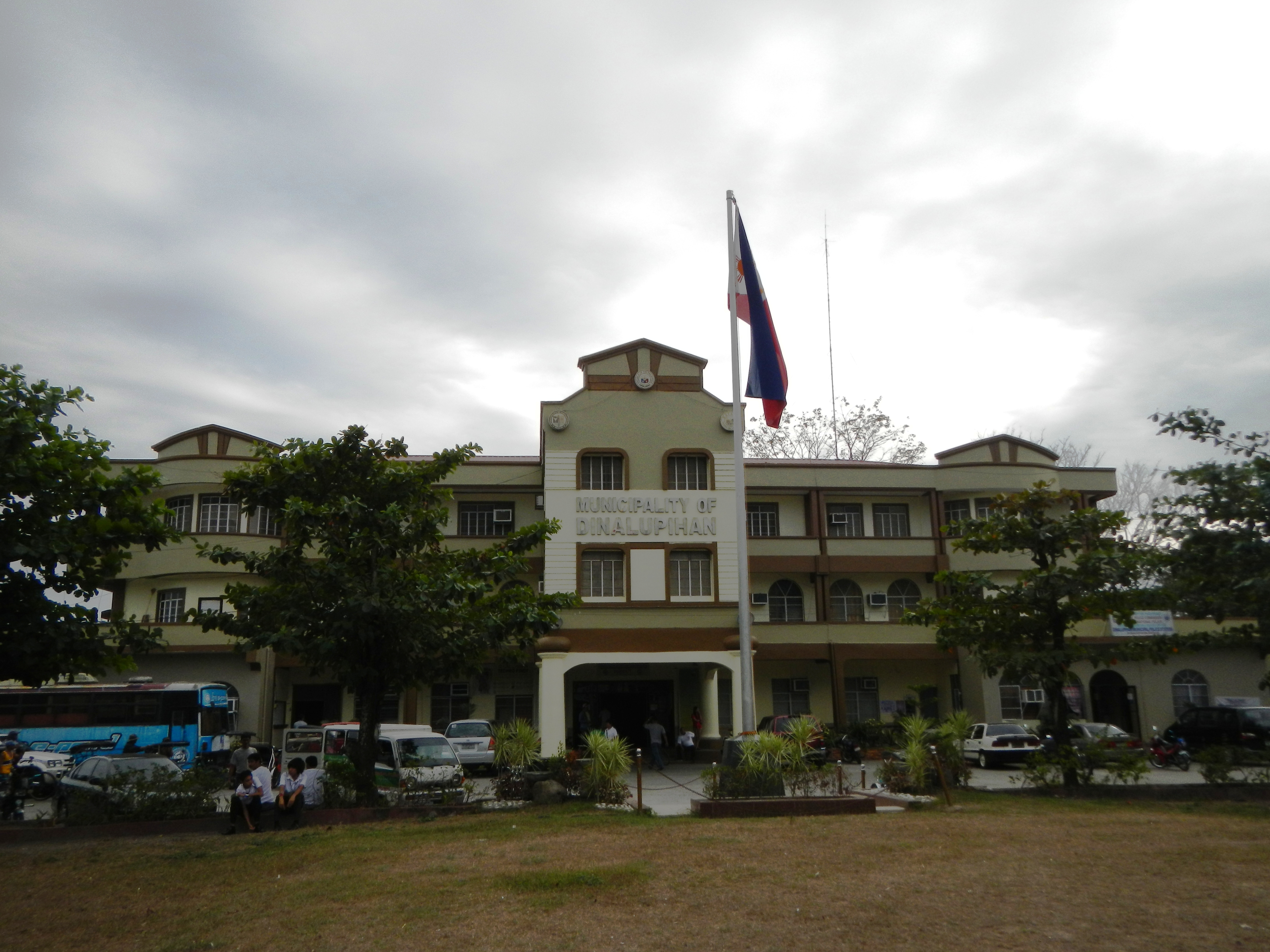
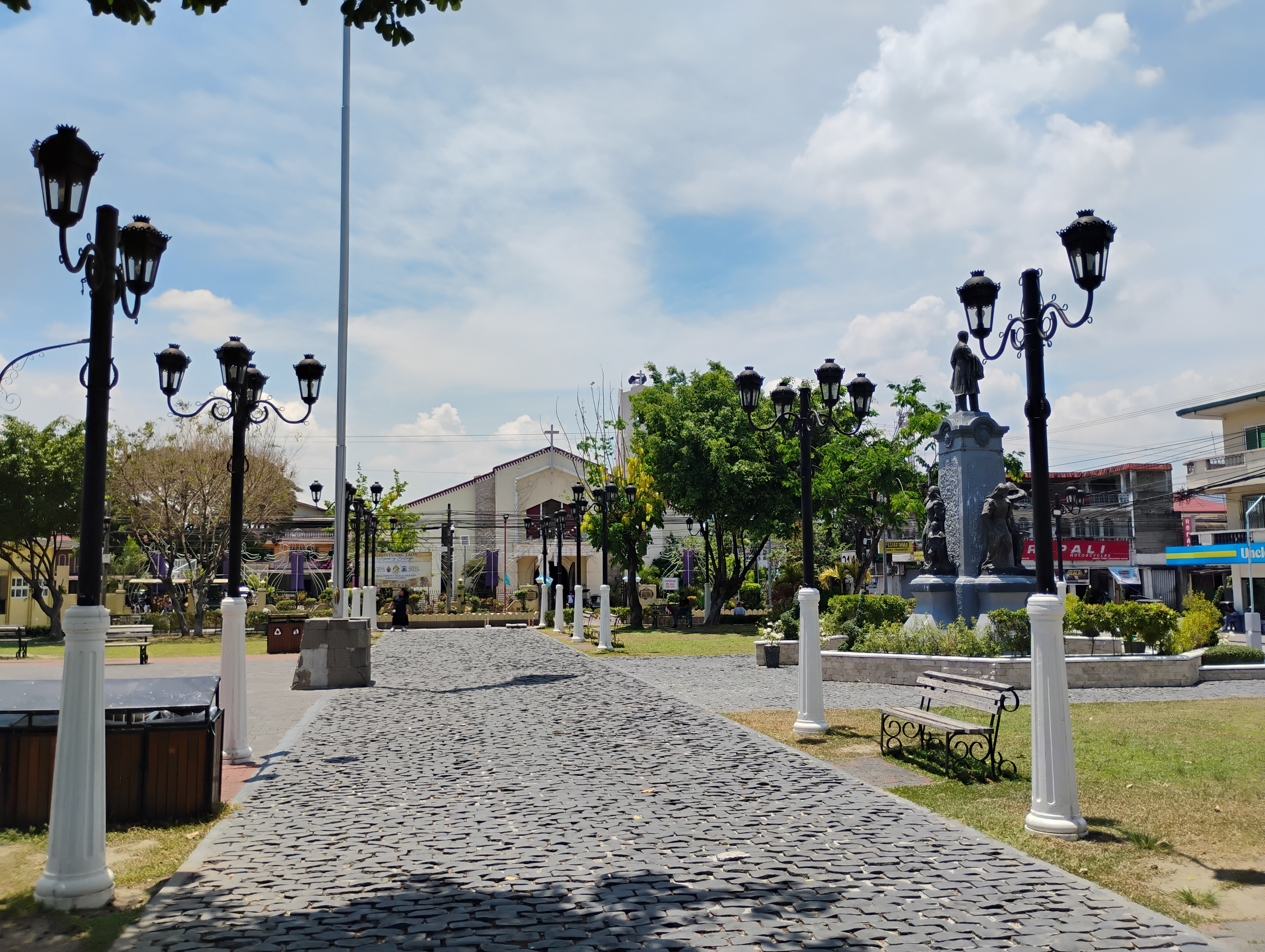
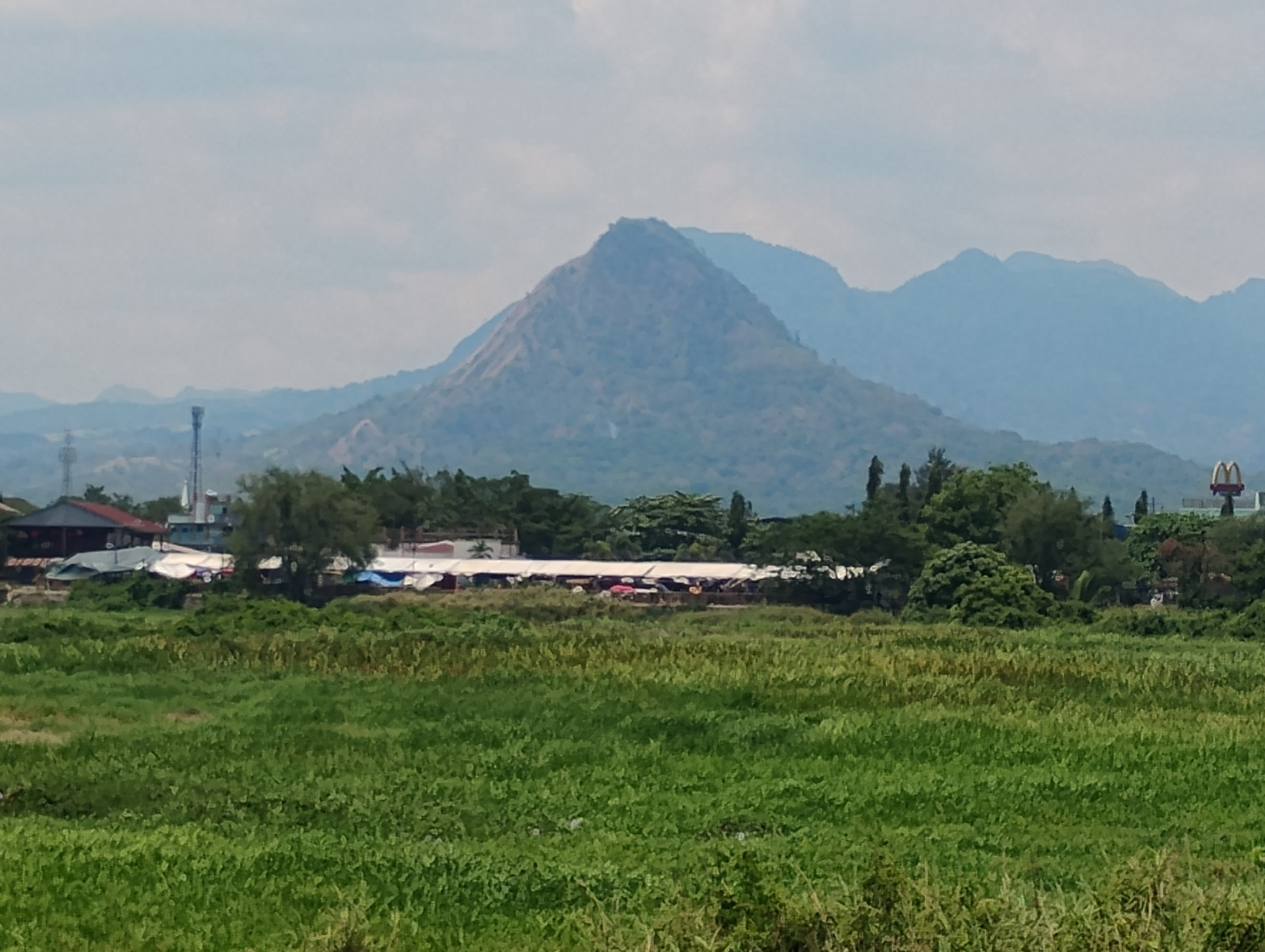
- Dinalupihan Municipal Hall Dinalupihan Town Plaza View of Mount Malasimbo from Dinalupihan

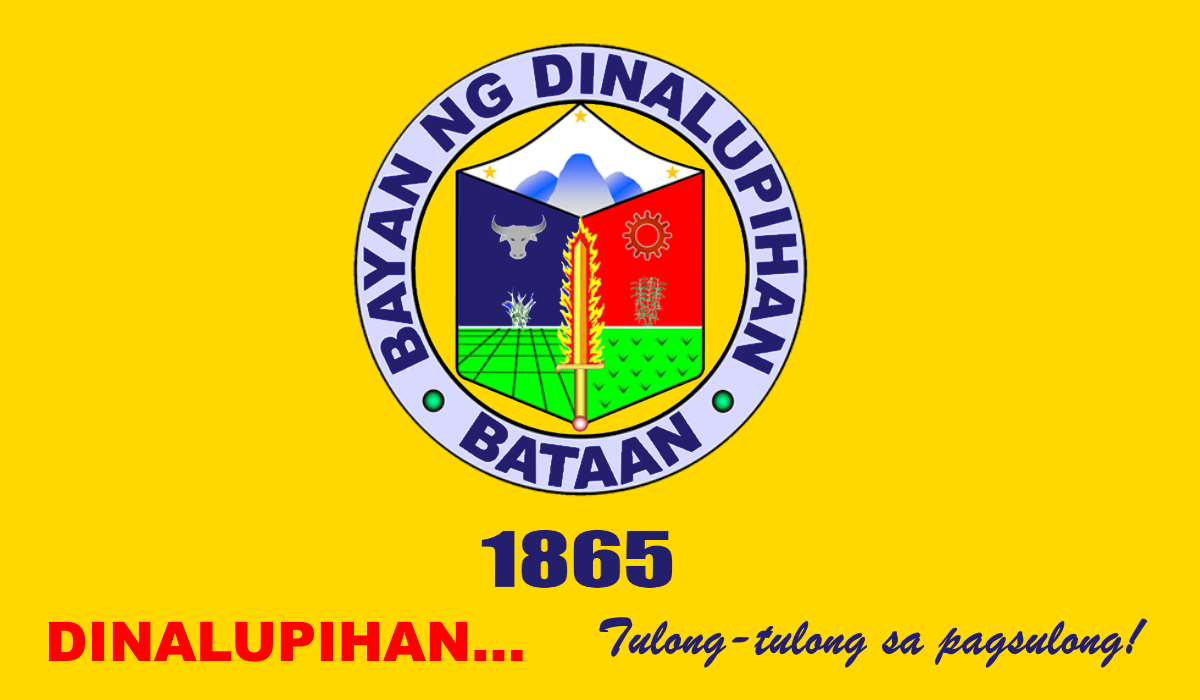
- Flag Seal

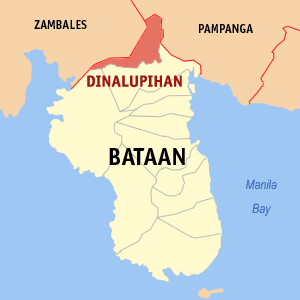
- Map of Bataan with Dinalupihan highlighted
- Interactive map of Dinalupihan
- Location in the Philippines
- Coordinates: 14°53′N 120°28′E
- Country: Philippines
- Region: Central Luzon
- Province: Bataan
- District: 3rd district
- Founded: 1865
- Barangays: 46 (see Barangays)

Government
  - Type: Sangguniang Bayan
  - Mayor: German M. Santos, Jr.
  - Vice Mayor: Fernando P. Manalili
  - Representative: Maria Angela S. Garcia
  - Municipal Council: Members: Gary O. David; Pamela Camille M. Sandoval; Melvin D. Tongol; Noli A. Soriano; Sherry U. De Ausen; Armando M. Buniag; Aurelio A. Cruz; Elizalde M. Torno
  - Electorate: 78,201 voters (2025)

Area
  - Total: 92.52 km^{2} (35.72 sq mi)
- Elevation: 30 m (98 ft)
- Highest elevation: 438 m (1,437 ft)
- Lowest elevation: 6 m (20 ft)

Population (2024 census)
  - Total: 124,188
  - Density: 1,342/km^{2} (3,476/sq mi)
  - Households: 28,513

Economy
  - Income class: 1st municipal income class
  - Poverty incidence: 8.58% (2023)
  - Revenue: ₱ 5,808 million (2024)
  - Assets: ₱ 599.2 million (2024)
  - Expenditure: ₱ 477.5 million (2024)
  - Liabilities: ₱ 341.7 million (2024)

Service provider
  - Electricity: Peninsula Electric Cooperative (PENELCO)
  - Water: Dinalupihan Water District (DWD)
- Time zone: UTC+8 (PST)
- ZIP code: 2110
- PSGC: 0300804000
- IDD : area code: +63 (0)47
- Native languages: Mariveleño; Kapampangan; Ambala; Tagalog
- Feast date: 24 June
- Patron saint: St. John the Baptist
- Website: www.dinalupihan.gov.ph

Dinalupihan, officially the Municipality of Dinalupihan (Tagalog: Bayan ng Dinalupihan; Kapampangan: Balen ning Dinalupihan; Ilocano: Ili ti Dinalupihan), is a municipality in the province of Bataan, Philippines. According to the 2024 census, it has a population of 124,188 people.

== Etymology ==
"Dinalupijan" came from the festival rites of the Aetas commemorating the deity "Indianalo", the goddess of hunting and bountiful harvest. "Indianalo" was paired with the Sanskrit word "jann", meaning paradise. "Indianalopijann" was the name given to the land that the Aetas received from their goddess which translates to Indianalo's paradise. As time passed, the name "Indianalopijann" turned into "Dinalupihan".

== History ==
On the afternoon of August 20, 1986, 23-year mayor Jose C. Payumo Jr., a Marcos loyalist, was assassinated in an ambush on his car in Barangay San Jose; Payumo's wife Lucila succeeded him as acting mayor, and was formally elected mayor in 1988. One of the perpetrators in Payumo's assassination, Benjamin S. Escaño, admitted to the National Bureau of Investigation (NBI) in December to being one of seven gunmen that fired on Payumo's car, stating that Payumo's political rival Reynaldo "Tikboy" Muli Sr. had given him P500 to commit the assassination; by January 14, 1987, Escaño was placed under arrest. In spite of Escaño's admission to guilt, however, the Balanga Regional Trial Court (RTC) under Judge Romeo Maglalang granted his counsel's application for bail on April 2, 1987, and he was set free from NBI custody on April 11, which was challenged in court by NBI Director Jesus Antonio Carpio. After failing to appear for his arraignment, however, Escaño was ordered arrested again on May 20. By 1991, the Supreme Court voided the Balanga RTC's April 1987 bail order for "grave abuse of discretion".

In 2003, businesman Rodolfo "Bong" Pineda was named as a suspected financier for jueteng operations in Dinalupihan after a raid in Barangay Old San Jose resulted in the arrest of 33 people that were "all employees of alleged jueteng lord Bong Pineda of Lubao".

In 2013, Maria Angela "Gila" Garcia won the mayoralty race over Jojo Payumo, becoming the first Dinalupihan mayor in 50 years to not be a member of the Payumo political family.

== Geography ==
The Municipality of Dinalupihan borders Hermosa to the south and southeast, the province of Zambales to the northwest with the highly urbanized city of Olongapo, and the province of Pampanga to the north and northeast. Floridablanca, Pampanga, is located directly to the north, and San Fernando, Pampanga, its regional center is located to the north-northeast. It is the only landlocked town in the province, is accessible via SCTEX (Subic–Clark–Tarlac Expressway) and the Bataan Provincial Expressway, off Exit 5.

Dinalupihan is situated 25.44 kilometres (15.81 mi) from the provincial capital Balanga, and 104.72 kilometres (65.07 mi) from the country's capital city of Manila.

According to the Philippine Statistics Authority, the municipality has a land area of 92.52 square kilometres (35.72 sq mi) constituting 6.74% of the 1,372.98-square-kilometre- (530.11 sq mi) total area of Bataan.

=== Climate ===
Climate data for Dinalupihan, Bataan
| Month | Jan | Feb | Mar | Apr | May | Jun | Jul | Aug | Sep | Oct | Nov | Dec | Year |
|---|---|---|---|---|---|---|---|---|---|---|---|---|---|
| Mean daily maximum °C (°F) | 30 (86) | 31 (88) | 33 (91) | 34 (93) | 33 (91) | 31 (88) | 29 (84) | 29 (84) | 29 (84) | 30 (86) | 31 (88) | 30 (86) | 31 (87) |
| Mean daily minimum °C (°F) | 19 (66) | 20 (68) | 21 (70) | 23 (73) | 25 (77) | 25 (77) | 25 (77) | 25 (77) | 24 (75) | 23 (73) | 22 (72) | 22 (72) | 23 (73) |
| Average precipitation mm (inches) | 8 (0.3) | 9 (0.4) | 15 (0.6) | 34 (1.3) | 138 (5.4) | 203 (8.0) | 242 (9.5) | 233 (9.2) | 201 (7.9) | 126 (5.0) | 50 (2.0) | 21 (0.8) | 1,280 (50.4) |
| Average rainy days | 3.7 | 4.1 | 6.5 | 11.2 | 21.2 | 24.9 | 27.7 | 26.5 | 25.5 | 21.8 | 12.6 | 5.6 | 191.3 |
Source: Meteoblue (modeled/calculated data, not measured locally)

=== Barangays ===
Dinalupihan is politically subdivided into 46 barangays. Each barangay consists of puroks and some have sitios.

| PSGC | Barangay | Population | | | ±% p.a. | |
| | | 2024 | | 2010 | | |
|---|---|---|---|---|---|---|
| 030804044 | Aquino | 0.1% | 95 | 111 | ▾ | −1.06% |
| 030804002 | Bangal | 3.8% | 4,774 | 4,415 | ▴ | 0.54% |
| 030804045 | Bayan‑bayanan | 0.6% | 728 | 447 | ▴ | 3.41% |
| 030804003 | Bonifacio (Poblacion) | 0.4% | 488 | 505 | ▾ | −0.23% |
| 030804006 | Burgos (Poblacion) | 0.3% | 411 | 465 | ▾ | −0.84% |
| 030804007 | Colo | 2.5% | 3,135 | 2,986 | ▴ | 0.34% |
| 030804008 | Daang Bago | 2.3% | 2,822 | 2,939 | ▾ | −0.28% |
| 030804009 | Dalao | 1.3% | 1,573 | 1,303 | ▴ | 1.30% |
| 030804010 | Del Pilar (Poblacion) | 0.2% | 291 | 271 | ▴ | 0.49% |
| 030804011 | Gen. Luna (Poblacion) | 0.5% | 608 | 585 | ▴ | 0.27% |
| 030804012 | Gomez (Poblacion) | 0.2% | 292 | 324 | ▾ | −0.71% |
| 030804013 | Happy Valley | 1.4% | 1,744 | 1,704 | ▴ | 0.16% |
| 030804050 | Jose C. Payumo, Jr. | 2.7% | 3,360 | 3,114 | ▴ | 0.52% |
| 030804014 | Kataasan | 2.4% | 2,990 | 3,015 | ▾ | −0.06% |
| 030804015 | Layac | 1.1% | 1,416 | 1,339 | ▴ | 0.38% |
| 030804016 | Luacan | 5.0% | 6,184 | 5,779 | ▴ | 0.47% |
| 030804018 | Mabini Ext. (Poblacion) | 0.6% | 703 | 734 | ▾ | −0.30% |
| 030804017 | Mabini Proper (Poblacion) | 0.3% | 324 | 339 | ▾ | −0.31% |
| 030804019 | Magsaysay | 1.4% | 1,737 | 1,871 | ▾ | −0.51% |
| 030804046 | Maligaya | 1.3% | 1,565 | 1,372 | ▴ | 0.91% |
| 030804020 | Naparing | 2.2% | 2,705 | 2,500 | ▴ | 0.54% |
| 030804021 | New San Jose | 4.8% | 6,012 | 6,030 | ▾ | −0.02% |
| 030804022 | Old San Jose | 1.9% | 2,421 | 2,002 | ▴ | 1.31% |
| 030804023 | Padre Dandan (Poblacion) | 0.1% | 159 | 155 | ▴ | 0.18% |
| 030804024 | Pag‑asa | 1.6% | 1,981 | 2,020 | ▾ | −0.13% |
| 030804025 | Pagalanggang | 3.2% | 3,931 | 3,512 | ▴ | 0.78% |
| 030804047 | Payangan | 0.6% | 770 | 554 | ▴ | 2.29% |
| 030804048 | Pentor | 2.4% | 3,041 | 2,934 | ▴ | 0.25% |
| 030804026 | Pinulot | 3.3% | 4,159 | 3,563 | ▴ | 1.07% |
| 030804027 | Pita | 2.9% | 3,578 | 3,513 | ▴ | 0.13% |
| 030804029 | Rizal (Poblacion) | 0.2% | 249 | 255 | ▾ | −0.16% |
| 030804030 | Roosevelt | 7.3% | 9,032 | 8,721 | ▴ | 0.24% |
| 030804031 | Roxas (Poblacion) | 0.2% | 293 | 347 | ▾ | −1.16% |
| 030804032 | Saguing | 3.6% | 4,455 | 3,964 | ▴ | 0.81% |
| 030804033 | San Benito | 2.2% | 2,739 | 2,394 | ▴ | 0.93% |
| 030804034 | San Isidro (Poblacion) | 0.8% | 983 | 1,047 | ▾ | −0.43% |
| 030804035 | San Pablo | 4.8% | 5,942 | 3,736 | ▴ | 3.24% |
| 030804036 | San Ramon | 3.1% | 3,904 | 3,707 | ▴ | 0.36% |
| 030804037 | San Simon | 1.4% | 1,800 | 1,278 | ▴ | 2.38% |
| 030804040 | Santa Isabel (Tabacan) | 1.9% | 2,412 | 2,190 | ▴ | 0.67% |
| 030804038 | Santo Niño | 2.6% | 3,190 | 3,066 | ▴ | 0.27% |
| 030804039 | Sapang Balas | 1.0% | 1,271 | 942 | ▴ | 2.08% |
| 030804041 | Torres (Poblacion) | 0.7% | 915 | 862 | ▴ | 0.41% |
| 030804049 | Tubo‑tubo | 0.4% | 549 | 342 | ▴ | 3.30% |
| 030804042 | Tucop | 3.4% | 4,284 | 3,686 | ▴ | 1.04% |
| 030804043 | Zamora (Poblacion) | 0.3% | 356 | 337 | ▴ | 0.38% |
| | Total | | 124,188 | 97,275 | ▴ | 1.69% |

== Demographics ==
Population census of Dinalupihan

| Year | Pop. | ±% p.a. |
|---|---|---|
| 1903 | 3,028 | — |
| 1918 | 4,319 | +2.40% |
| 1939 | 8,821 | +3.46% |
| 1948 | 14,341 | +5.55% |
| 1960 | 21,249 | +3.33% |
| 1970 | 30,509 | +3.68% |
| 1975 | 36,302 | +3.55% |
| 1980 | 41,415 | +2.67% |

| Year | Pop. | ±% p.a. |
|---|---|---|
| 1990 | 58,172 | +3.46% |
| 1995 | 65,159 | +2.15% |
| 2000 | 76,145 | +3.40% |
| 2007 | 92,289 | +2.69% |
| 2010 | 97,275 | +1.93% |
| 2015 | 106,371 | +1.72% |
| 2020 | 118,209 | +2.25% |
| 2024 | 124,188 | +1.19% |

Source: Philippine Statistics Authority

In the 2024 census, Dinalupihan had a population of 124,188 people. The population density was 1,300 inhabitants per square kilometre (3,400/sq mi).

== Economy ==
Poverty incidence of Dinalupihan (%)

Source: Philippine Statistics Authority

== Government ==
=== Local government ===
Pursuant to the Local government in the Philippines", the political seat of the municipal government is located at the Municipal Town Hall. The legislative and executive departments perform their functions in the Sangguniang Bayan (Session Hall) and Municipal Trial Court, respectively, and are located in the Town Hall.

=== Elected officials ===
Members of the Dinalupihan Municipal Council (2025-2028)
| Position | Name of official |
|---|---|
| District Representative (3rd Legislative District, Bataan) | Maria Angela Garcia |
| Municipal Mayor | German M. Santos Jr. |
| Municipal Vice Mayor | Fernando P. Manalili |
| Municipal Councilors | Gary O. David |
| Municipal Councilors | Pamela Camille M. Sandoval |
| Municipal Councilors | Melvin D. Tongol |
| Municipal Councilors | Noli A. Soriano |
| Municipal Councilors | Sherry U. De Ausen |
| Municipal Councilors | Armando M. Buniag |
| Municipal Councilors | Aurelio A. Cruz |
| Municipal Councilors | Elizalde M. Torno |

Dinalupihan, Bataan's incumbent mayor is German M. Santos Jr. (NUP) and the vice mayor is Fernando P. Manalili (NUP).

Sangguniang Bayan Members are: Gary O. David, Pamela Camille M. Sandoval, Melvin D. Tongol, Noli A. Soriano, Sherry U. De Ausen, Armando M. Buniag, Aurelio A. Cruz, and Elizalde M. Torno.

== Tourism ==
Dinalupihan's interesting points, landmarks and festivals, are:

- Battle of Bataan, Layac Junction marker
- World War II First Line of Defense Memorial (Battle of Bataan - Battle of Layac Junction, January 6, 1942)
- 38th Infantry Division (United States) marker, Layac Junction
- Roosevelt Protected Landscape, also known as Roosevelt Park, is the location shooting of Enchanted Garden
- Town Hall
- Bataan Peninsula State University, Dinalupihan campus
- Bataan Peninsula Medical Center
- Saint John Academy Inc.
- Dinalupihan Civic Center
- Heaven's Garden Memorial Park
- Dinalupihan Memorial Park
- Mount Malasimbo
- Tubig Festival (June 24)

=== Saint John the Baptist Parish Church ===
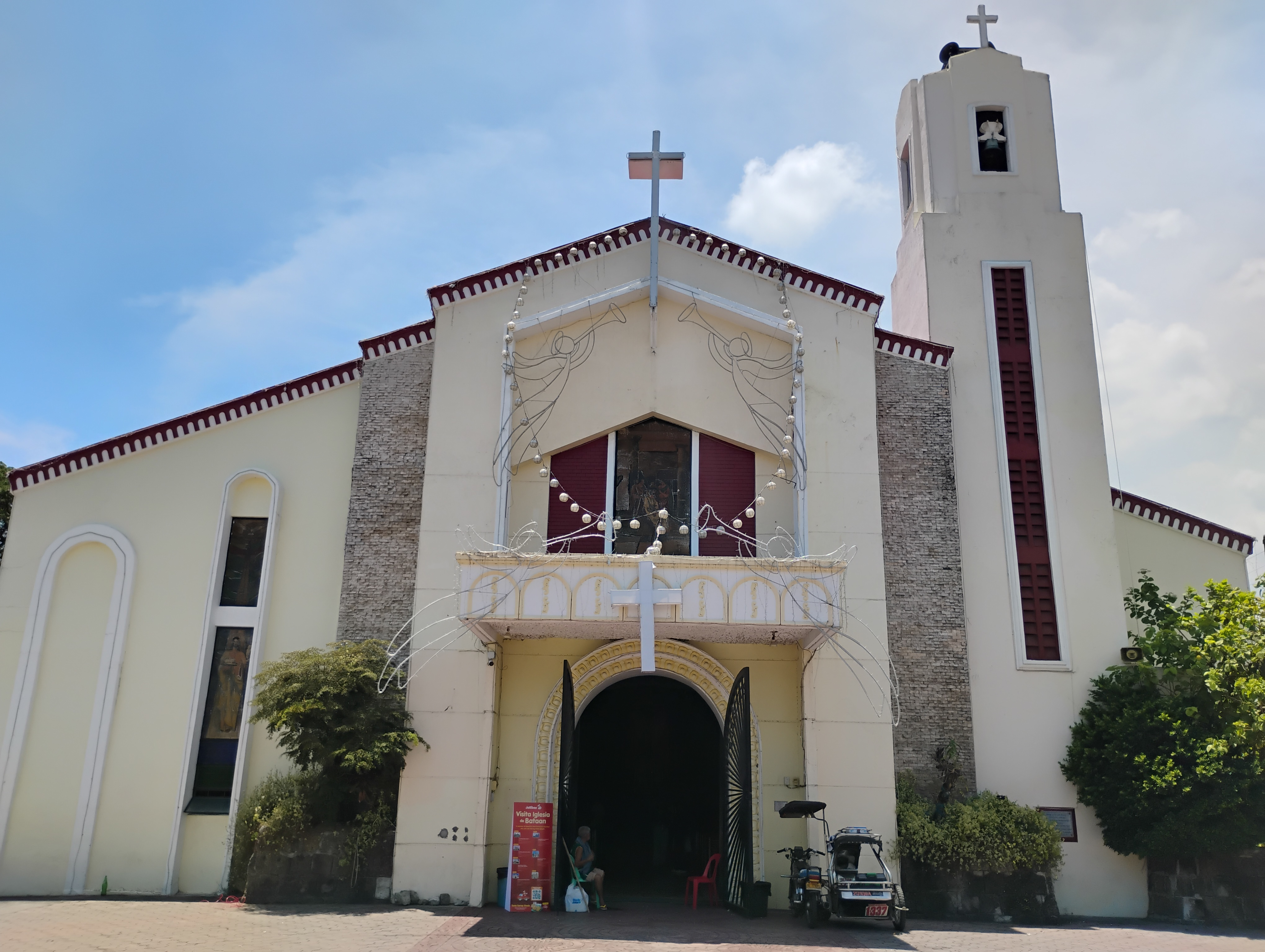
Saint John the Baptist Church facade

Saint John the Baptist Parish Church (in Poblacion) belongs to the Roman Catholic Diocese of Balanga (Dioecesis Balangensis) Part of the Ecclesiastical Province of San Fernando, Pampanga Created: March 17, 1975. Canonically Erected: November 8, 1975. Comprises the whole civil province of Bataan. Titular: St. Joseph, Husband of Mary, April 28).

Its Feast day is June 24. It is under the Vicariate of Saint Peter of Verona I - Vicariate of Our Lady, Mirror of Justice. The Catholic population is about 25,438.

== Education ==
There are two schools district offices which govern all educational institutions within the municipality. They oversee the management and operations of all private and public, from primary to secondary schools. These are Dinalupihan East, and Dinalupihan West schools district offices.

=== Primary and elementary schools ===
- Bangal Elementary School
- Bayan-Bayanan Elementary School
- Bethel Ecumenical Kiddie School
- Colo Elementary School
- Daang Bago Elementary School
- Dalao Elementary School
- Dinalupihan Adventist Elementary School
- Dinalupihan Elementary School
- Happy Valley Elementary School
- Holy Family Center of Studies
- Immaculate Heart of Mary School
- Jose C. Payumo Jr. Elementary School
- Kataasan Elementary School
- Layac Elementary School
- Luacan Child Development Center
- Luakan Elementary School
- Magsaysay Elementary School
- Maligaya Elementary School
- Mother Margherita de Brincat Catholic School
- Naparing Elementary School
- New San Jose Elementary School
- Old San Jose Elementary School
- Pag-asa Elementary School
- Pagalanggang Elementary School
- Payangan Elementary School
- Pentor Elementary School
- Pinulot Elementary School
- Pita Elementary School
- Roosevelt Elementary School
- Saguing Elementary School
- San Benito Elementary School
- San Pablo Elementary School
- San Ramon Elementary School
- San Simon Elementary School
- Sapang Balas Elementary School
- St. Jerome Emiliani School
- St. John Academy
- Sta. Isabel Elementary School
- Sto. Nino Elementary School
- Tubo-Tubo Elementary School

=== Secondary schools ===
- Jose C. Payumo Jr. Memorial High School
- Luakan National High School
- Luakan National High School - Annex
- Magsaysay National High School
- Pagalanggang National High School
- Roosevelt National High School
- Sta. Lucia High School
- Tucop Integrated School

=== Higher educational institutions ===
- College of Subic Montessori
- College of Subic Montessori - Lincoln Heights Campus
- University of Nueva Caceres

== Notable personalities ==
- Gary David — PBA multi-awarded player
- Chito Jaime — PBA player
- Jackie Rice — Filipina actress who won the title of Ultimate Female Survivor on the third season of Startstruck.
- Felicito Payumo — Representative of Bataan's 1st district (1987–1998); chairman of the Subic Bay Metropolitan Authority from 1998 to 2004.
- Anthony Morales — Executive Assistant of the Subic Bay Metropolitan Authority from 2015–Present.
- Tommy Peñaflor — Actor, Model, Dancer finalist of Eat Bulaga's That's My Bae.

== Gallery ==
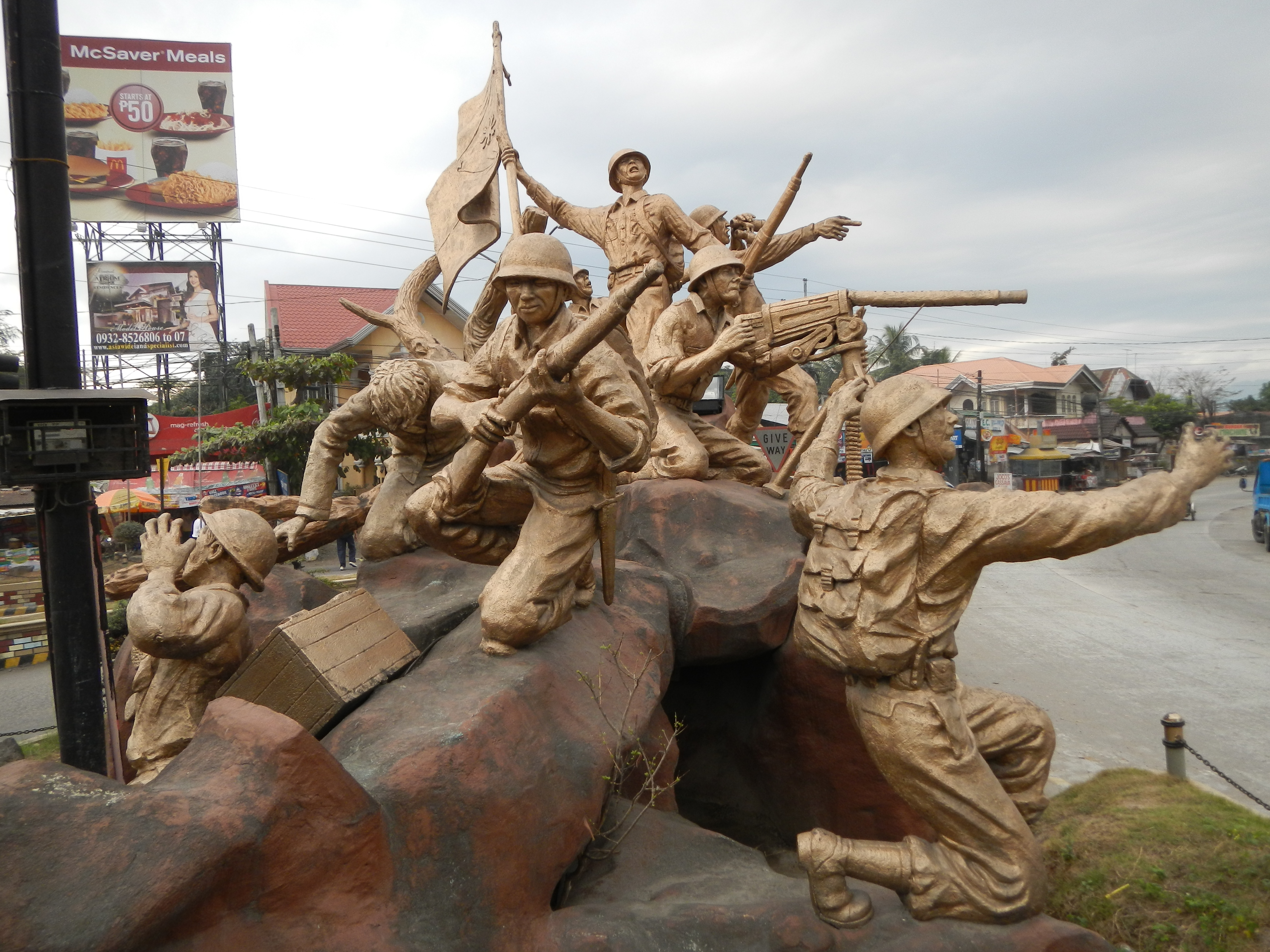
World War II First Line of Defense Memorial (Battle of Bataan - Battle of Layac Junction, January 6, 1942)

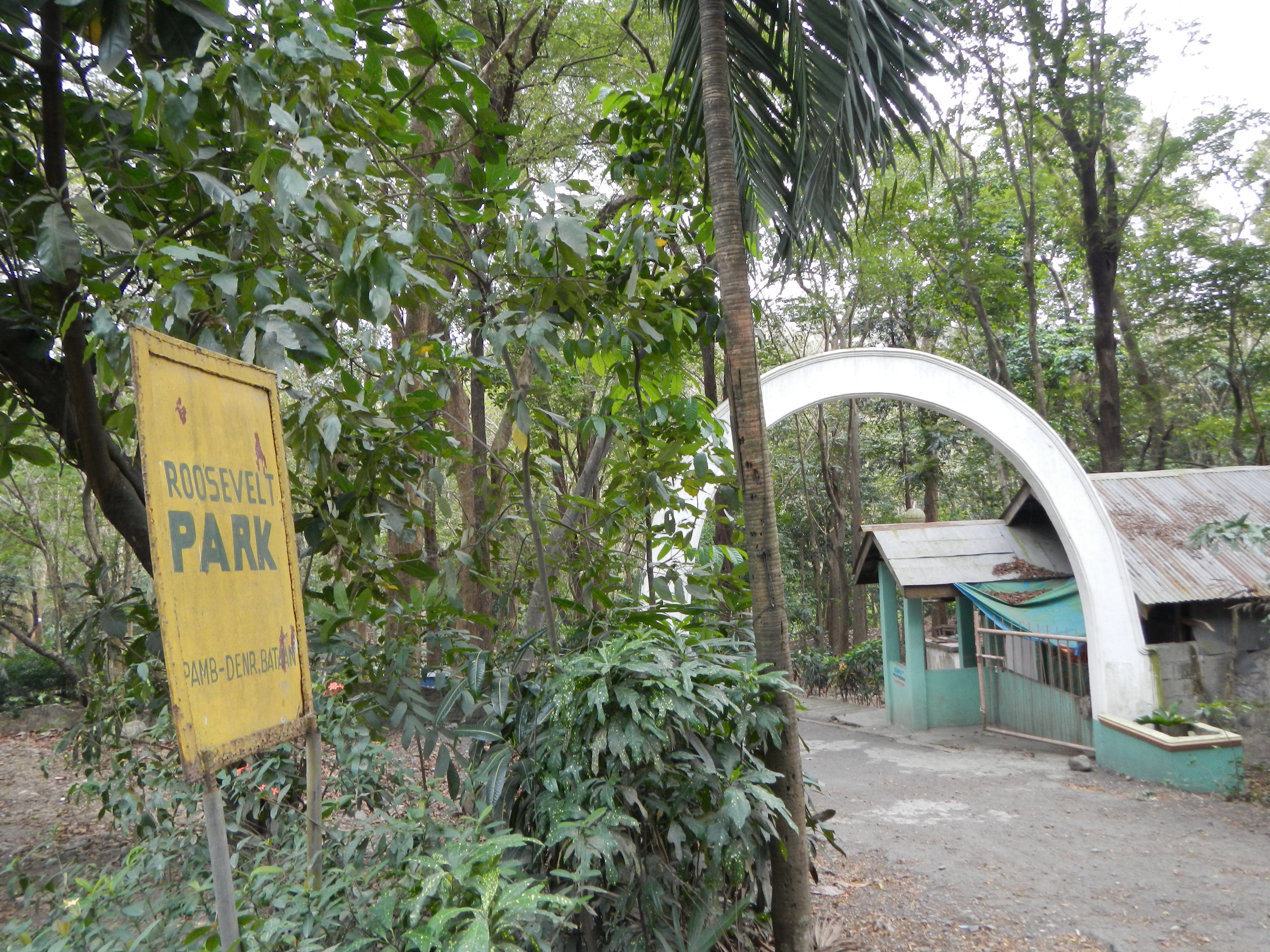
Roosevelt Park is the location shooting of Enchanted Garden

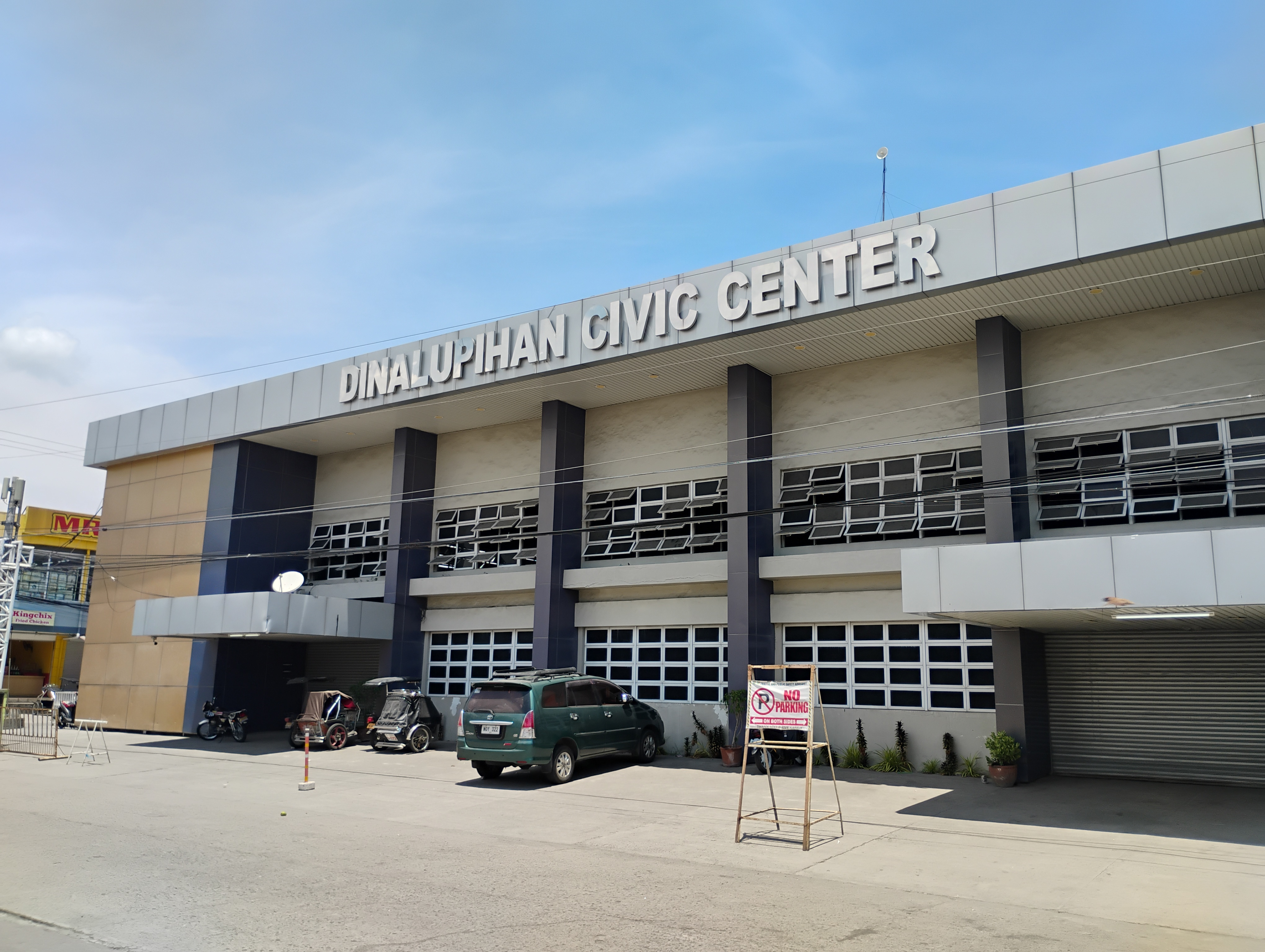
Dinalupihan Civic Center

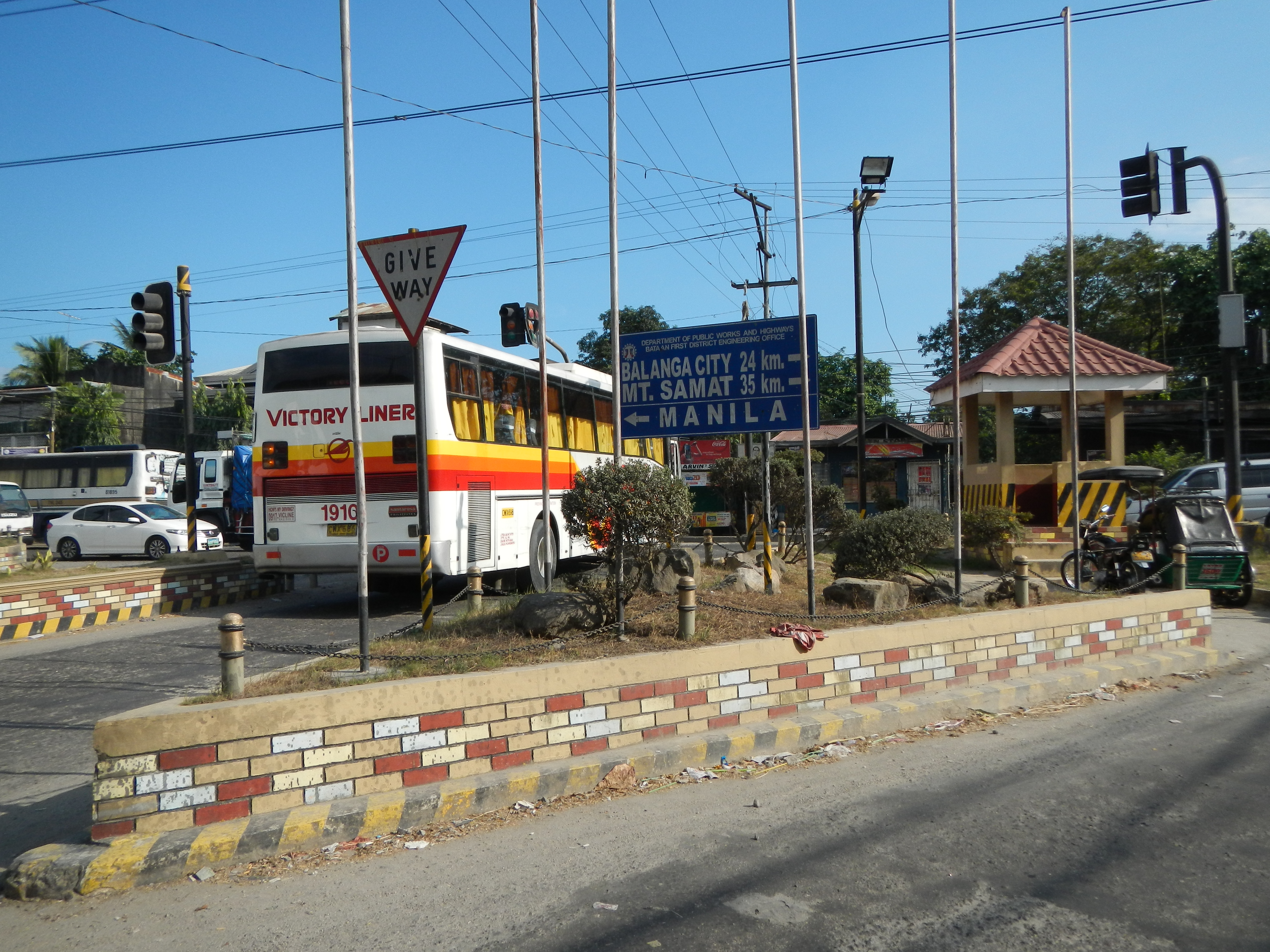
Layac Junction

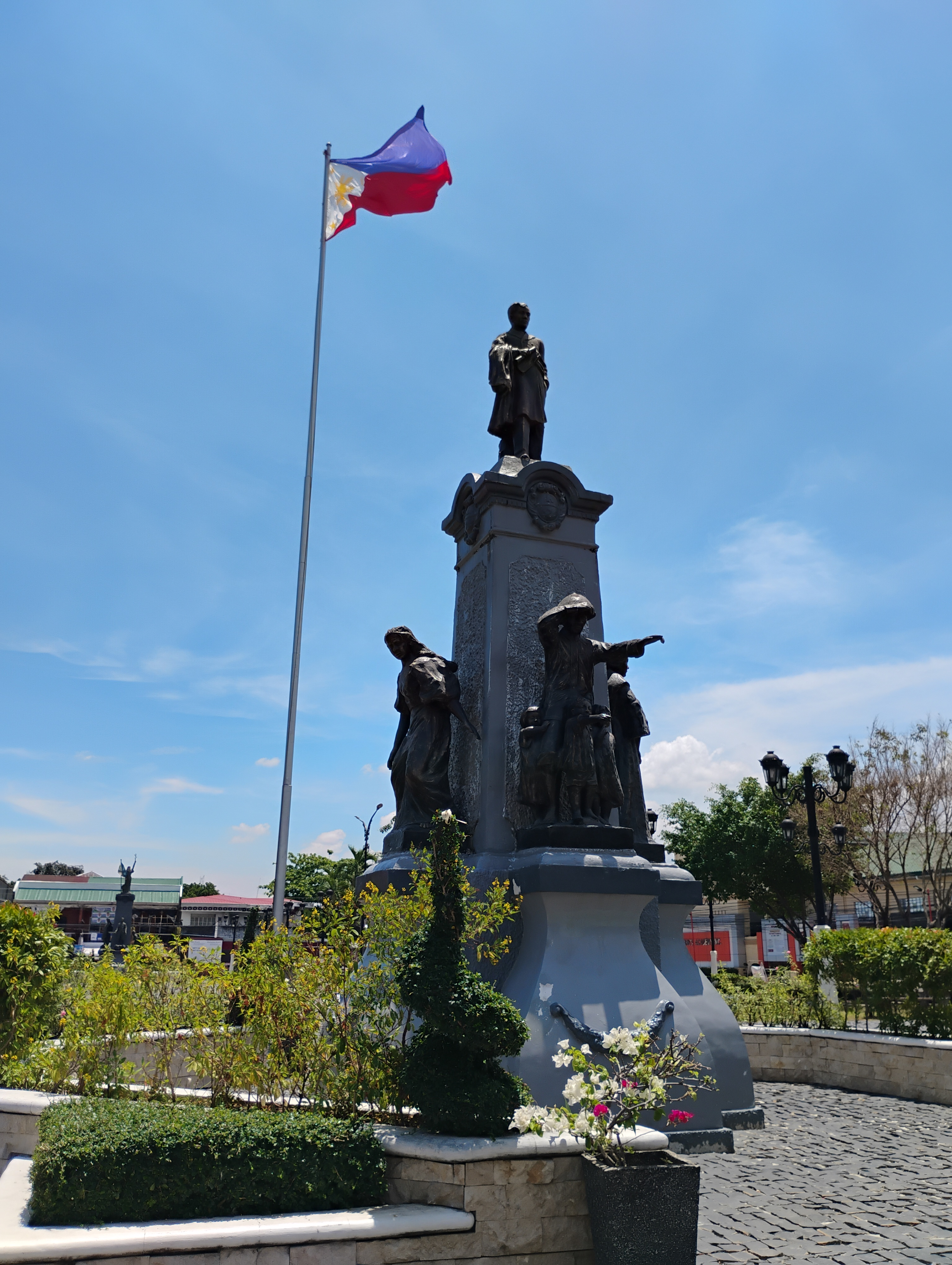
Rizal Monument of Dinalupihan
