= Tomás Pinpin =

Philippine printer and writer (born 1580s)

- Born: Between 1580 and 1585; Abucay, Bataan, Captaincy General of the Philippines
- Died: after 1648
- Occupation(s): Printer, publisher
- Spouse: unknown
- Children: Simon
- Parent: unknown

Tomás Pinpin was a printer, writer and publisher from Abucay, a municipality in the province of Bataan, Philippines, who was the first Philippine printer and is sometimes referred as the "Prince of the Filipino Printers."

Pinpin is remembered for being the first Philippine personage to publish and print a book, Librong Pagaaralan nang mga Tagalog nang Uicang Castilla (Reference Book for the Tagalogs for Learning Spanish language) in 1610, entirely written by himself in the old Tagalog orthography.

== Biography ==
=== Early life ===
Tomás Pinpin was born in Barrio Mabatang, Abucay, Bataan, between 1580 and 1585. The exact dates of birth and death as well as his parentage are unknown, because in 1646, Dutch looters raided his home town of Abucay and burned the parish records. However, his last name indicates that he must have had Chinese ancestors.

He is thought to have first come into contact with the printing world around 1608 or 1609, learning from the work of other Christian Chinese printers such as Juan de Vera, Pedro de Vera and Luis Beltran, who had already printed several books for Spanish missionaries.

Pinpin started working as an apprentice at the printing press in Abucay in 1609. The printing press was run by the Dominicans, and Father Blancas employed young Pinpin and taught him the printing techniques of the time. In just one year he had developed enough skills to be promoted to printing manager.

=== Work as a printer ===
In 1610 he printed the book Arte y Reglas de la Lengua Tagala, by his mentor Father Francisco Blancas de San Jose, and in the same year his famous Librong Pagaaralan nang manga Tagalog nang Uicang Castilla was printed by his assistant, Diego Talaghay. The book contained 119 pages divided into five parts and was meant to help Filipinos learn the Spanish language. The prologue read:

"Let us therefore study, my country men, for although the art of learning is somewhat difficult, yet if we are persevering, we shall soon improve our knowledge.

Other Tagalogs like us did not take a year to learn the Spanish language when using my book. This good result has given me satisfaction and encouraged me to print my work, so that all may derive some profit from it."

Although the Librong Pagaaralan was the first printed book written by a Filipino in the local Tagalog language, it was not the first one in history, as it had been preceded by Doctrina Christiana en Lengua Espanola y Tagala, that had been printed in Tagalog, in both Latin script and the commonly used Baybayin script of the natives of the time, in the year 1593.

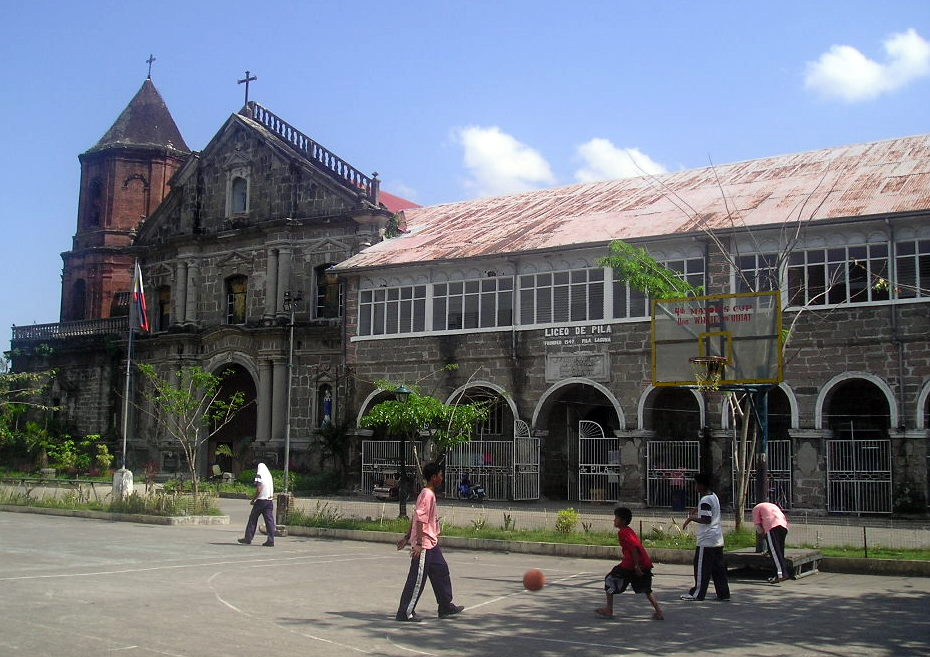
Building in Pila where the Franciscans put up the printing press that was supervised by Tomas Pinpin

In 1612 Pinpin supervised the set up of a printing press owned by the Franciscans in Pila, Laguna, where he printed Vocabulario de Lengua Tagala, by Fray Pedro de San Buenaventura, which was the first dictionary of a language of the Philippine islands ever printed. He is also known to have printed at Binondo, Manila, between 1623 and 1627, as the early printing press was being transported to several places to bring the art of printing.

In 1637 he published and printed what is thought to be the first newspaper in the Philippines, the 14-page Sucesos Felices, that reported mainly on Spanish military victories.

It is estimated that all throughout his career, from 1609 to 1639, Tomas Pinpin printed at least fourteen different publications.

=== Late years ===
Based on the fact that a book printed in 1648 contained the sentence "Printed in the Office of Tomas Pin-pin", historians believe that later in life he must have opened a printing shop together with his son Simon, to whom he taught the art of printing, and whose name appears on several books from the Jesuit press. This is not the church where Tomás Pinpin set up the printing press owned by the Franciscan it was in old Pila church now a ruin in Tirado Victoria Laguna.

=== Death and afterward ===
There are no other records of Tomás Pinpin after 1648, so both the date of his death and the place are unaccounted for.

== Books printed ==
- Arte y reglas de la lengua Tagala, 1610, by Padre Blancas (digital copy).
- Librong Pagaaralan nang manga Tagalog nang Uicang Castilla, 1610.
- Vocabulario de lengua Tagala, 1613, by Pedro de San Buenaventura.
- Relacion de Martyrio del B. P. Fr. Pedro Vazquez, 1625 (digital copy).
- Relacion verdadera, y breve de la persecucion, y martirios que padecieron por la confession de nuestra Santa Fee Catholica en Iapon, quinze Religiosos, 1625 (digital copy)
- Triunfo del Santo Rosario y Orden de S. Domingo en los reynos del Iapon, by Carreras, 1626 (digital copy).
- Arte de la lengua Iloca, by Francisco Lopez, 1627.
- Vocabulario de Japon, 1630 (digital copy).
- Ritual para administrar los sanctos sacramentos sacado casi todo del Ritual Romano, i lo de mas del Ritual Indico, 1630 (digital copy).
- Confesionario en lengua Tagala, by Herreras, 1636.
- Sucesos Felices, Newspaper, 1637.
- Relacion de la Vida y Martirio del Jesuita P. Mastrillo, 1639.
