= Abucay =

Municipality in Bataan, Philippines

- Municipality
- Municipality of Abucay
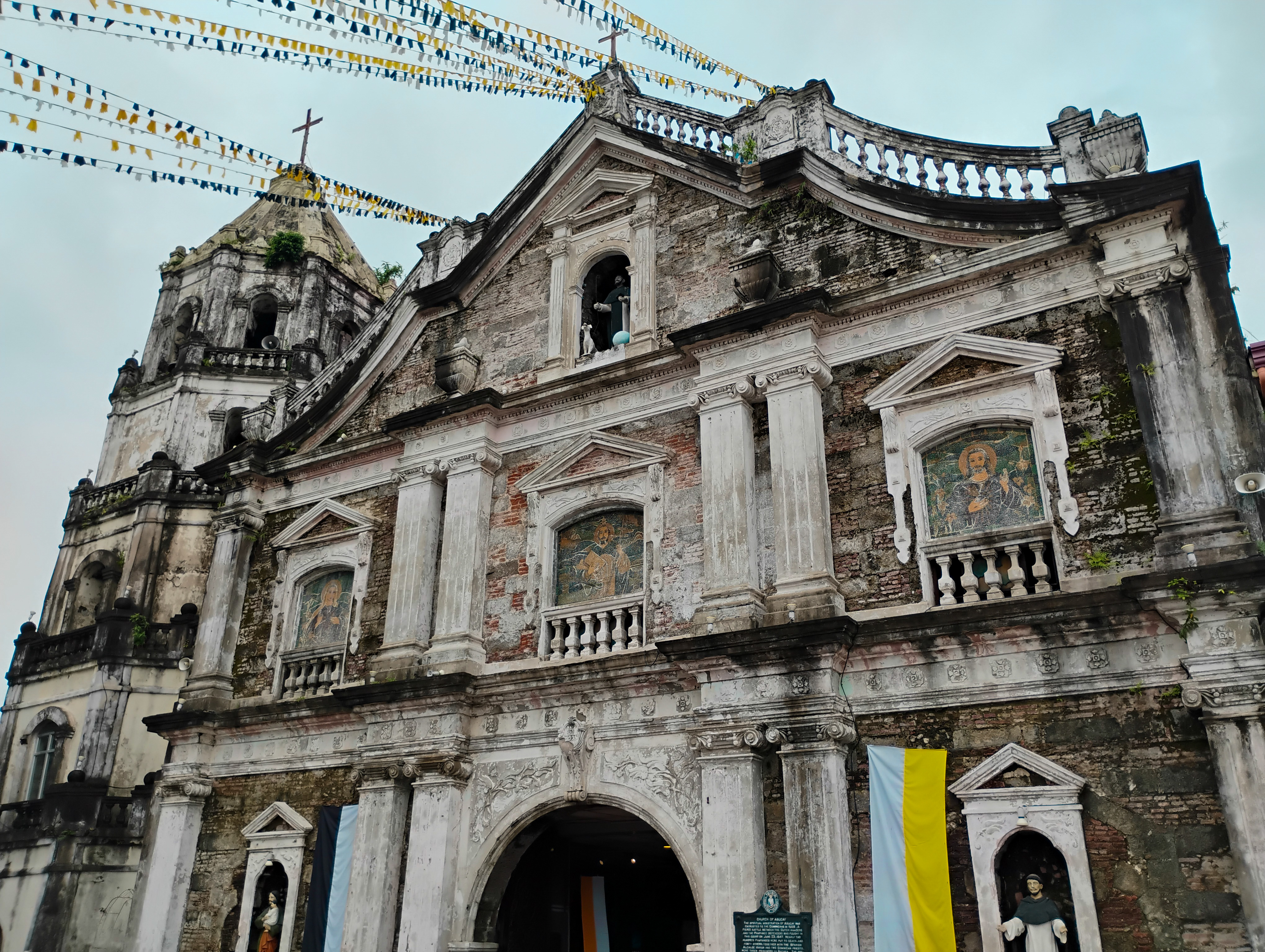
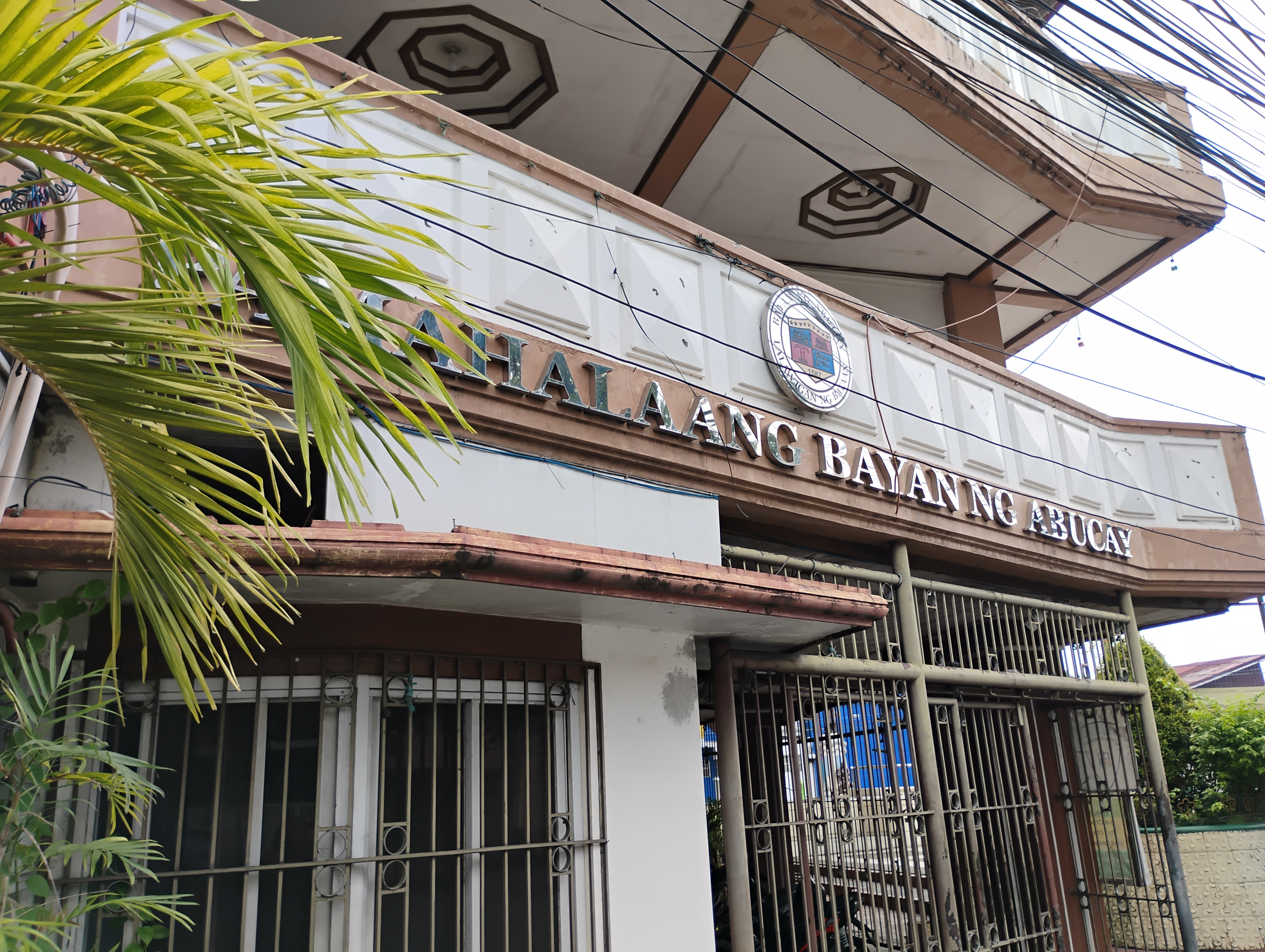
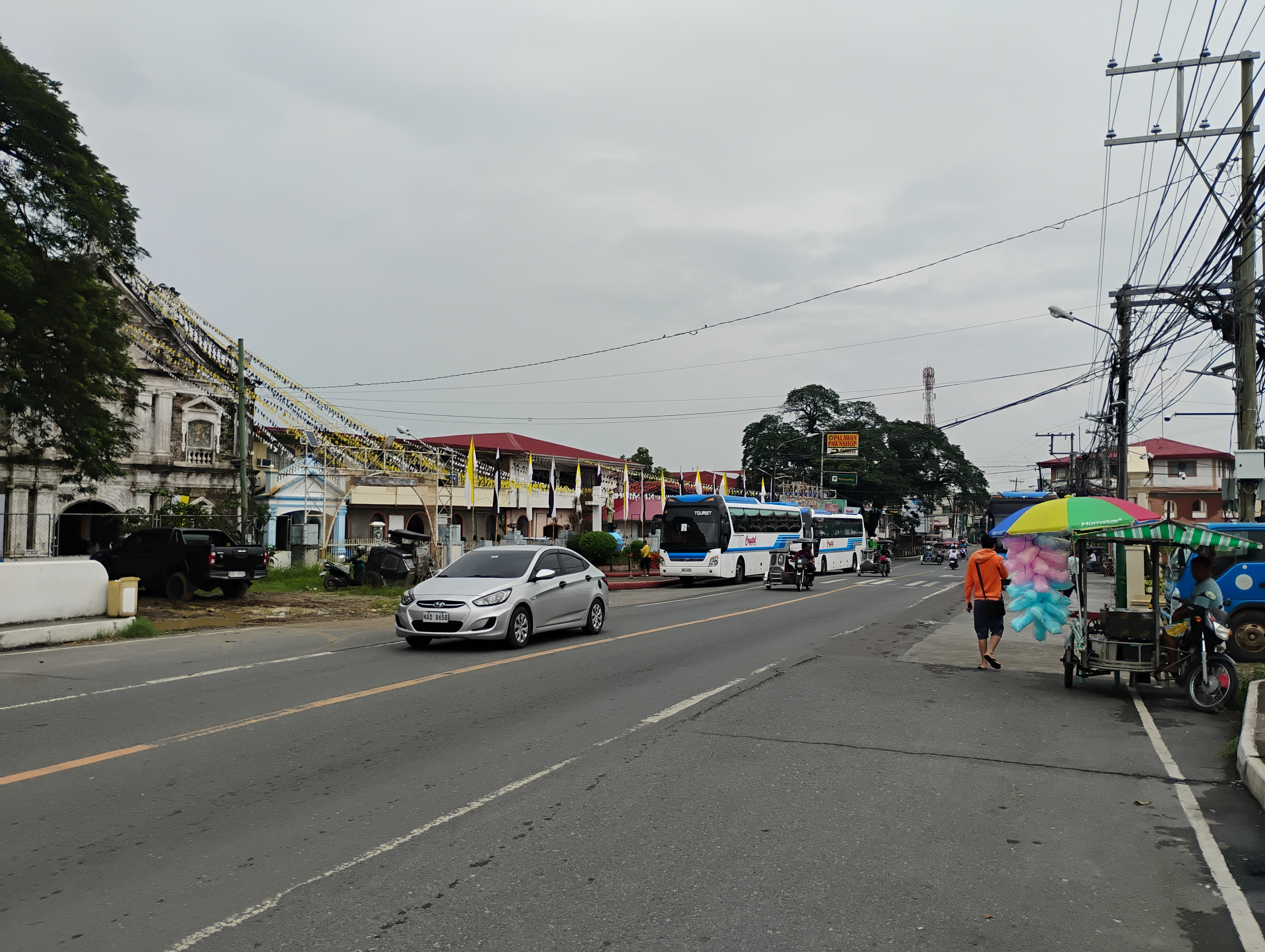
- Saint Dominic de Guzman Parish Church Abucay Old Municipal Hall Abucay Town Proper

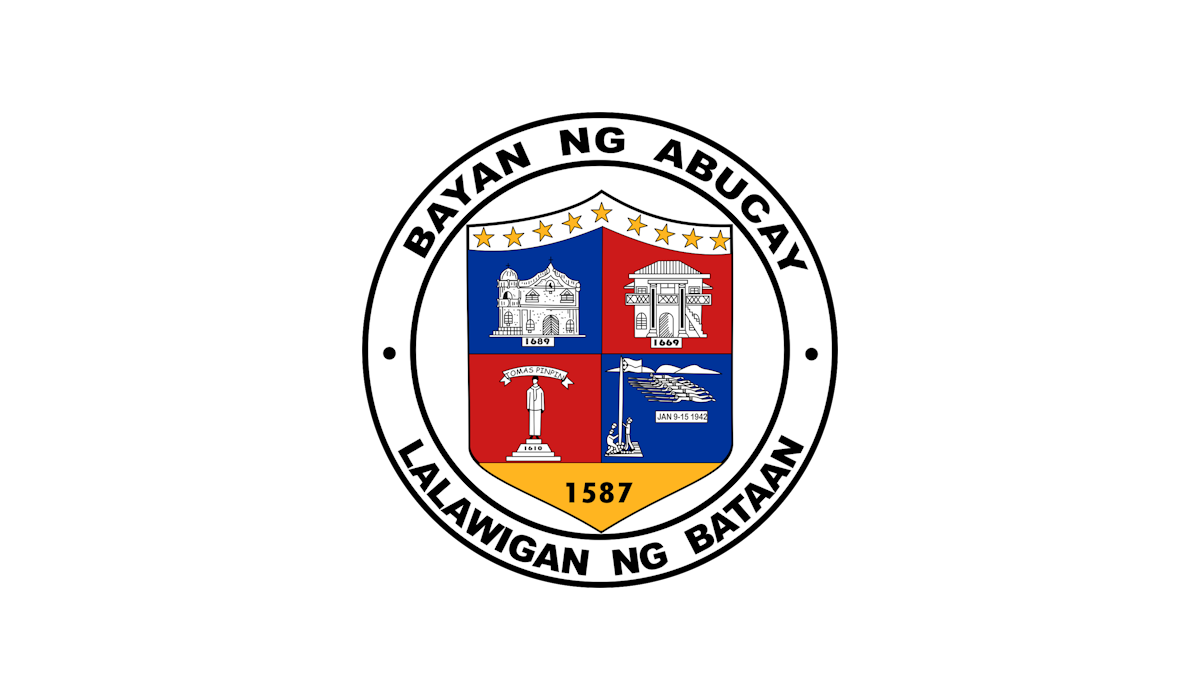
- Flag Seal

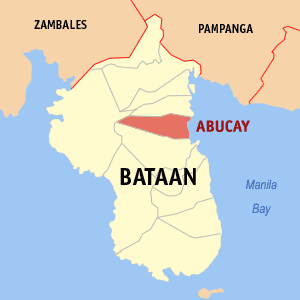
- Map of Bataan with Abucay highlighted
- Interactive map of Abucay
- Location in the Philippines
- Coordinates: 14°43′20″N 120°32′08″E
- Country: Philippines
- Region: Central Luzon
- Province: Bataan
- District: 1st district
- Founded: 1587
- Barangays: 9 (see Barangays)

Government
  - Type: Sangguniang Bayan
  - Mayor: Erik J. Martel
  - Vice Mayor: Roberto "Wangbu" F. Pabustan
  - Representative: Antonino B. Roman III
  - Municipal Council: Members: Roy C. Samson; Dante M. Baluyot; Tikboy Soriano; Rowell Agrade; Ato Dulay; Arthur Mungcal; Ric Ernest Estrella; Jay Sacdalan
  - Electorate: 29,163 voters (2025)

Area
  - Total: 79.72 km^{2} (30.78 sq mi)
- Elevation: 27 m (89 ft)
- Highest elevation: 172 m (564 ft)
- Lowest elevation: 0 m (0 ft)

Population (2024 census)
  - Total: 44,846
  - Density: 562.5/km^{2} (1,457/sq mi)
  - Households: 10,522

Economy
  - Income class: 2nd municipal income class
  - Poverty incidence: 8.11% (2023)
  - Revenue: ₱ 237.4 million (2024)
  - Assets: ₱ 659.9 million (2024)
  - Expenditure: ₱ 218.4 million (2024)
  - Liabilities: ₱ 126.5 million (2024)

Service provider
  - Electricity: Peninsula Electric Cooperative (PENELCO)
- Time zone: UTC+8 (PST)
- ZIP code: 2114
- PSGC: 0300801000
- IDD : area code: +63 (0)47
- Native languages: Mariveleño; Tagalog

Abucay, officially the Municipality of Abucay, (Tagalog: Bayan ng Abucay; Kapampangan: Balen ning Abucay (Mabatang dialect: Balayan ning Abucay); Spanish: Municipio de Abucay), is a municipality in the province of Bataan, Philippines. According to the 2024 census, it has a population of 44,846 people.

== History ==
The first printing press in the archipelago was found in this town. Tomas Pinpin, the first Filipino printer, learned the art from Fray Francisco Blanca de San Jose and Juan de Vera, a Chinese printer at the University of Santo Tomas.

On June 23, 1647, a fierce battle was fought between the Dutch invaders and the Pampango defenders in the near the Abucay church area. Nearly 200 Pampangos were put to death and 40 others together with Pampanga’s Spanish alcalde mayor (town mayor) Antonio de Cabrera. Dominican priests Father Geronimo Sotomayor and Father Tomas Ramos were taken to Batavia. The 1818 Spanish census showed there to be 1,406 native families and 20 Spanish-Filipino families.

== Geography ==
The Municipality of Abucay borders Balanga (the capital city) to the south, Samal to the north and northwest, Morong to the west, and the Manila Bay to the east. The town is accessible via the Bataan Provincial Expressway, off Exit 25, or the parallel National Road in Bataan. Its westernmost elevated section is located within the Bataan National Park.

According to the Philippine Statistics Authority, the municipality has a land area of 79.72 square kilometres (30.78 sq mi) constituting 5.81% of the 1,372.98-square-kilometre- (530.11 sq mi) total area of Bataan.

The topography of Abucay varies from the mountainous terrain of Mount Natib caldera in the west to the coastal areas of the province along the shore of Manila Bay. Six rivers with a combined length of 37 kilometres (23 mi) originate from the mountain flowing in the west-to-east direction.

Abucay is situated 4.78 kilometres (2.97 mi) from the provincial capital Balanga, and 117.79 kilometres (73.19 mi) from the country's capital city of Manila.

=== Climate ===
Climate data for Abucay, Bataan
Month	Jan	Feb	Mar	Apr	May	Jun	Jul	Aug	Sep	Oct	Nov	Dec	Year
Mean daily maximum °C (°F)	31 (88)	32 (90)	34 (93)	35 (95)	33 (91)	31 (88)	29 (84)	29 (84)	29 (84)	30 (86)	31 (88)	31 (88)	31 (88)
Mean daily minimum °C (°F)	19 (66)	19 (66)	20 (68)	23 (73)	25 (77)	25 (77)	25 (77)	25 (77)	24 (75)	23 (73)	21 (70)	20 (68)	22 (72)
Average precipitation mm (inches)	7 (0.3)	8 (0.3)	14 (0.6)	26 (1.0)	127 (5.0)	210 (8.3)	263 (10.4)	272 (10.7)	218 (8.6)	114 (4.5)	46 (1.8)	21 (0.8)	1,326 (52.3)
Average rainy days	4.0	4.0	6.9	11.2	21.0	24.5	27.4	26.9	25.9	21.9	13.4	6.3	193.4
Source: Meteoblue (modeled/calculated data, not measured locally)

=== Barangays ===
Abucay is politically subdivided into 9 barangays. Each barangay consists of puroks and some have sitios.

PSGC	Barangay	Population			±% p.a.	
		2024		2010		
030801001	Bangkal	1.5%	695	634	▴	0.64%
030801002	Calaylayan (Poblacion)	10.8%	4,833	4,391	▴	0.67%
030801003	Capitangan	15.0%	6,742	6,041	▴	0.76%
030801004	Gabon	12.1%	5,405	5,241	▴	0.21%
030801006	Laon (Poblacion)	5.1%	2,303	2,245	▴	0.18%
030801007	Mabatang	20.4%	9,165	8,571	▴	0.47%
030801008	Omboy	7.0%	3,149	3,219	▾	−0.15%
030801010	Salian	7.1%	3,199	2,885	▴	0.72%
030801011	Wawa (Poblacion)	9.8%	4,389	4,492	▾	−0.16%
	Total		44,846	37,719	▴	1.21%

== Demographics ==
Population census of Abucay

Year	Pop.	±% p.a.
1903	6,320	—
1918	7,485	+1.13%
1939	10,216	+1.49%
1948	8,453	−2.08%
1960	12,900	+3.58%
1970	18,140	+3.46%
1975	20,437	+2.42%
1980	22,692	+2.11%

Year	Pop.	±% p.a.
1990	26,708	+1.64%
1995	29,270	+1.73%
2000	31,801	+1.79%
2007	38,554	+2.69%
2010	37,719	−0.79%
2015	39,880	+1.07%
2020	42,984	+1.59%
2024	44,846	+1.02%

Source: Philippine Statistics Authority

In the 2024 census, Abucay had a population of 44,846 people. The population density was 560 inhabitants per square kilometre (1,500/sq mi).

Most of the people of Abucay speak the Tagalog language. There are also residents who speak "Kapampangang Hilaw," a dialect variation of the Kapampangan language, in Barangay Mabatang.

== Economy ==
Poverty incidence of Abucay (%)

Source: Philippine Statistics Authority

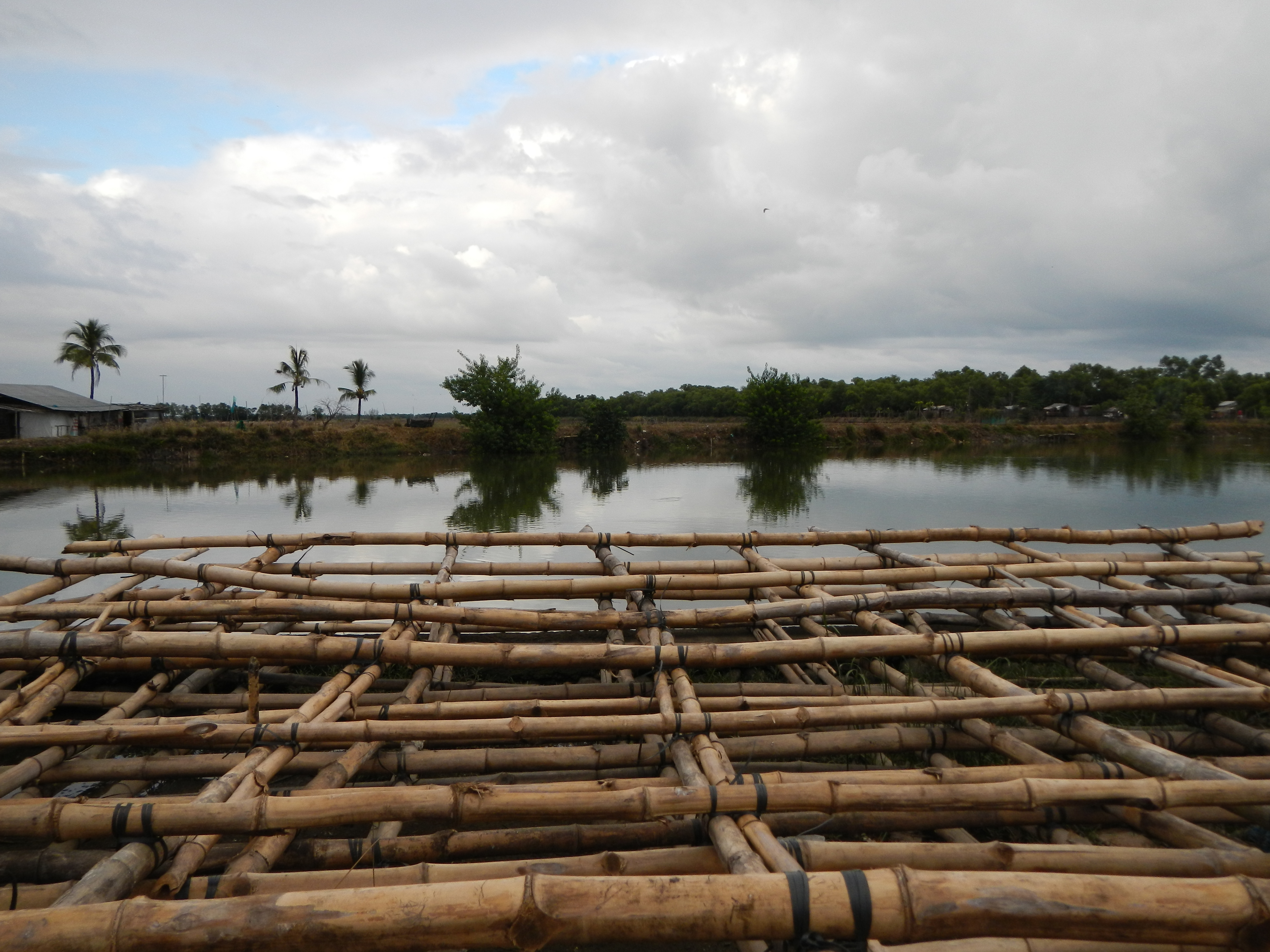
Bamboos for mussel culture

The mainly agricultural and fishing town is situated on the northeastern portion of the Bataan Peninsula, along Manila Bay, with a total land area of 79.72 square kilometres (30.78 sq mi).

It is basically an agricultural and fishing town. Besides Manila Bay, existing fishponds cover an area of 1,521 hectares (3,760 acres) of which 319 hectares (790 acres) are under intensive use while the rest are non-functioning but available for utilization. These fishponds are rich with commercial species like milkfish, tilapia, pla-pla and shrimps.

Agricultural lands in Abucay produces rice, corn, root crops, legumes, vegetable and various kinds of fruits as well as forest-grown bamboo and buho. Most of the walis tambo (local brooms) sold in Baguio come from Abucay.

== Government ==
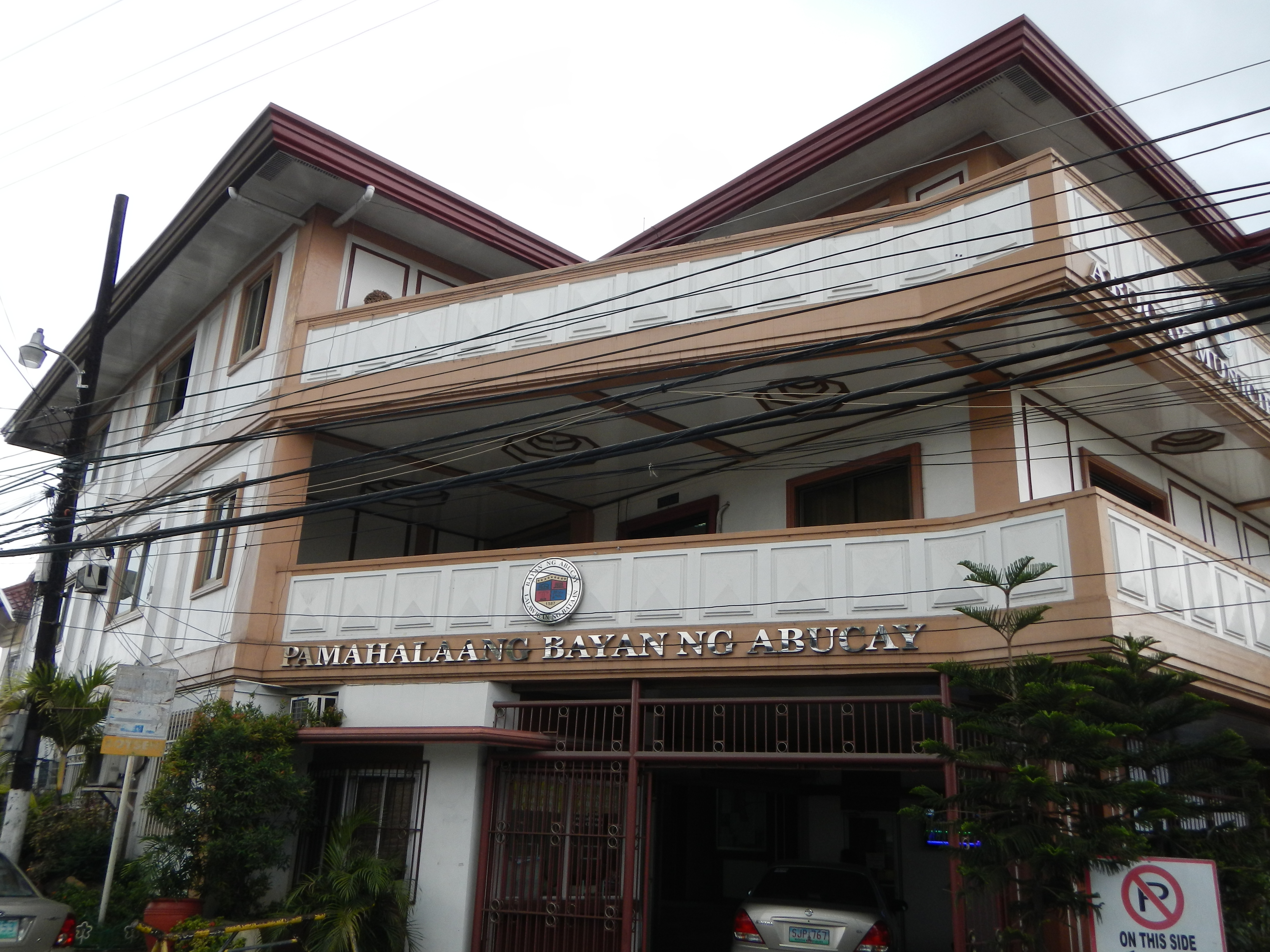
The old Municipal Hall

The political seat of the municipal government is located at the Municipal Hall (also called Town Hall). During the Spanish colonial period, the Gobernadorcillo was the chief executive who held office at the town hall, then called the Presidencia.

During the American period from 1898 to 1946, the elected Mayor and local officials, including the appointed ones hold office at the Municipal Town Hall. The executive and legislative departments perform their functions at the Sangguniang Bayan (Session Hall) and Municipal Trial Court, respectively, which are located at the Municipal Hall.

Members of the Abucay Municipal Council (2025–present):

- District Representative (1st Legislative District, Bataan): Antonino B. Roman III
- Municipal Mayor: Erik J. Martel (IND)
- Municipal Vice Mayor: Roberto Pabustan (PFP)
- Municipal Councilors:
  - Roy Samson (PFP)
  - Dante Baluyot (PFP)
  - Tikboy Soriano (PFP)
  - Rowell Agrade (IND)
  - Ato Dulay (PFP)
  - Arturo Mungcal (IND)
  - Ric Ernest Estrella (BLKTN)
  - Jay Sacdalan (PFP)

The eight Sangguniang Bayan members led by the Vice Mayor hold office at the Abucay Sangguniang Bayan Session Hall.

== Tourism ==
=== Saint Dominic de Guzman Parish Church ===
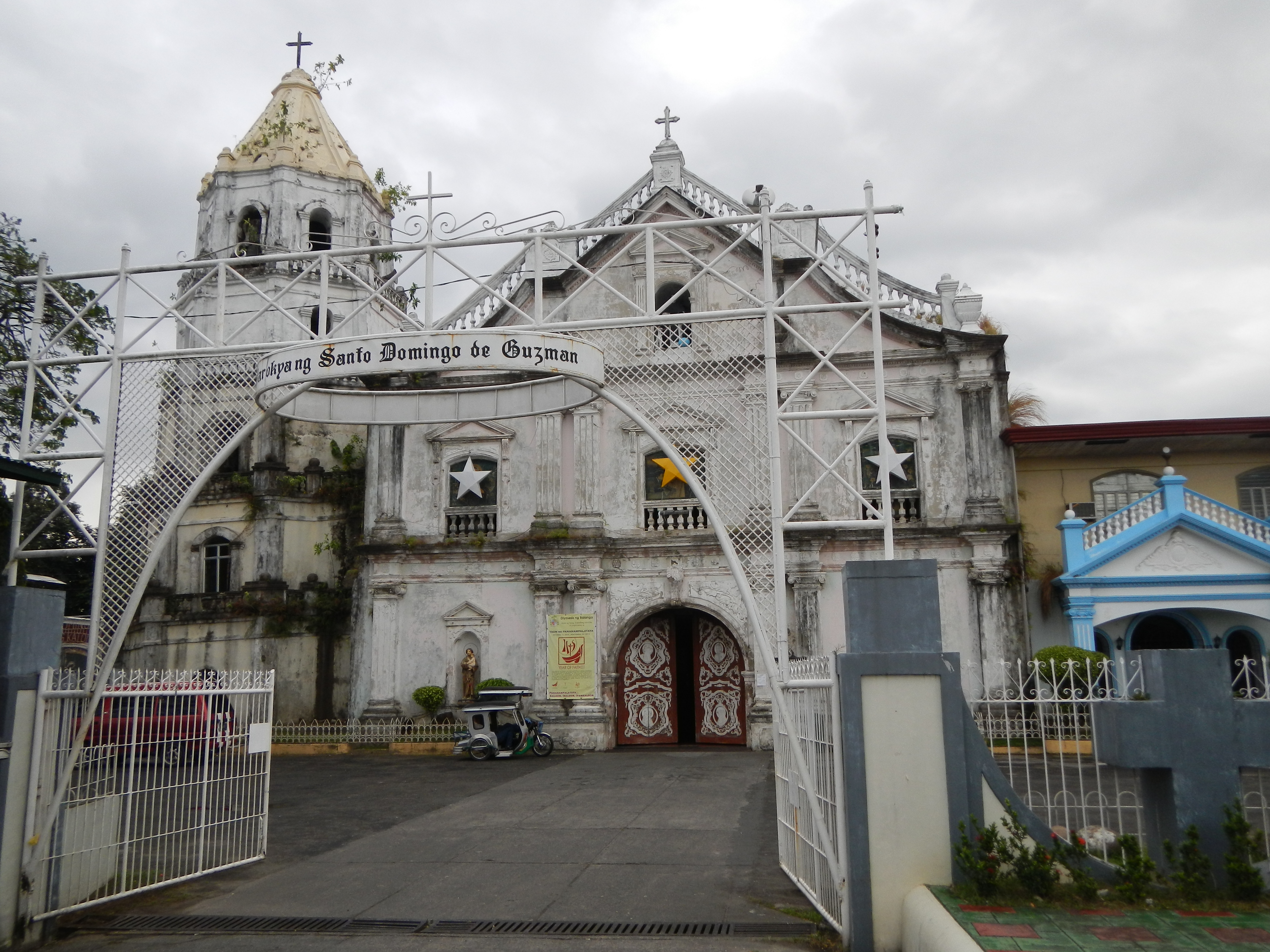
Parish Church of Saint Dominic de Guzman

One of the oldest in the Philippines, the first Abucay Church was established in 1587 and was administered by the Dominicans in 1588. The present church was built sometime in the early 1600s, the exact year is still unknown. The Church was badly damaged by the earthquake of September 16, 1852, and again by a fire in 1870. Father Jose Diego Pelaez rebuilt the church.

The church still houses the bells donated in 1839 and 1859. The five bells of the Abucay Church were restored on January 17, 1978, by U.S. Naval Base Facility in Subic Bay, Zambales province according to a historical marker in the church.

The Parish of Saint Dominic de Guzman has a population of 19,501 Catholics. Its patron saint is Saint Dominic de Guzman and the town's feast day is August 8. The present parish priest is Rev. Fr. Milver R. Cruz succeeding Rev. Fr. Josue Enero on June 5, 2023. The church belongs to the Roman Catholic Diocese of Balanga under the Vicariate of Saint Dominic de Guzman.

=== Other attractions ===
Landmarks include the following:

- Tomas Pinpin Monument — a memorial to Tomas Pinpin, the "Patriarch of Filipino Printing" in barangay Ibayo. The monument stands at the center of Tomas Pinpin Memorial Elementary School, the central and the biggest public elementary school in Abucay.
- Maria Canon Statue — In Barangay Sibul, a tower was erected by the Mie-ken Daiichi Shiēseo of the Japanese Sohyōshin Sports in 1978 to invoke the repose of dead souls from the World War II period.
- Pasukulan Falls — located in west Abucay in the forested valley of Mount Natib. The place is ideal for picnics.
- Sibul Springs — located in western Abucay featuring sulfuric swimming pools with a wide area for outdoor recreation. Its main attraction is the natural spring believed to provide muscle pain relief.
- Christmas Village in Mabatang — Christmas celebration in Mabatang extends to the streets of every sitio in the barangay, which are lavishly adorned to rejoice the season.
- Abucay Cockpit

== Infrastructure ==
Electric power for Abucay is served by the Peninsula Electric Cooperative (PENELCO).

A 10-hectare (25-acre) sanitary landfill in Sitio Macao in Barangay Capitangan is the first of its kind in the province of Bataan.

== Education ==
The Abucay Schools District Office governs all educational institutions within the municipality. It oversees the management and operations of all private and public, from primary to secondary schools.

=== Primary and elementary schools ===
- Abucay North Elementary School
- Bangkal Elementary School
- Bangkal Resettlement Elementary School
- Capitangan Elementary School
- Hacienda Elementary School
- Hoffman Academy
- Jesus Reigns Christian Learning Center
- Jose Abejar Memorial Elementary School
- Kabukiran Elementary School
- Mabatang Elementary School
- P. Rubiano Elementary School
- Salian Elementary School
- T. Pinpin Memoria Elementary School
- Wawa Elementary School
- Woodfield Academy of Bataan

=== Secondary schools ===
- B. Camacho National High School
- Bangkal High School
- Mabatang National High School
- SOFTNET Information Technology Center

=== Higher educational institutions ===
- Colegio de San Juan de Letran - the Abucay campus of the Colegio de San Juan de Letran is situated in Dominican Hills, 8 kilometres (5.0 mi) west of town center of Abucay, on the slopes of Mount Natib at about 840 feet (260 m) in elevation.
- Bataan Peninsula State University-Abucay campus - formerly the Bataan National Agricultural School (BNAS) now part of the state university in Bataan.
- Eastwoods College of Science and Technology
