= Balanga, Bataan =

Capital city of Bataan, Philippines

Balanga
- Component city
- City of Balanga
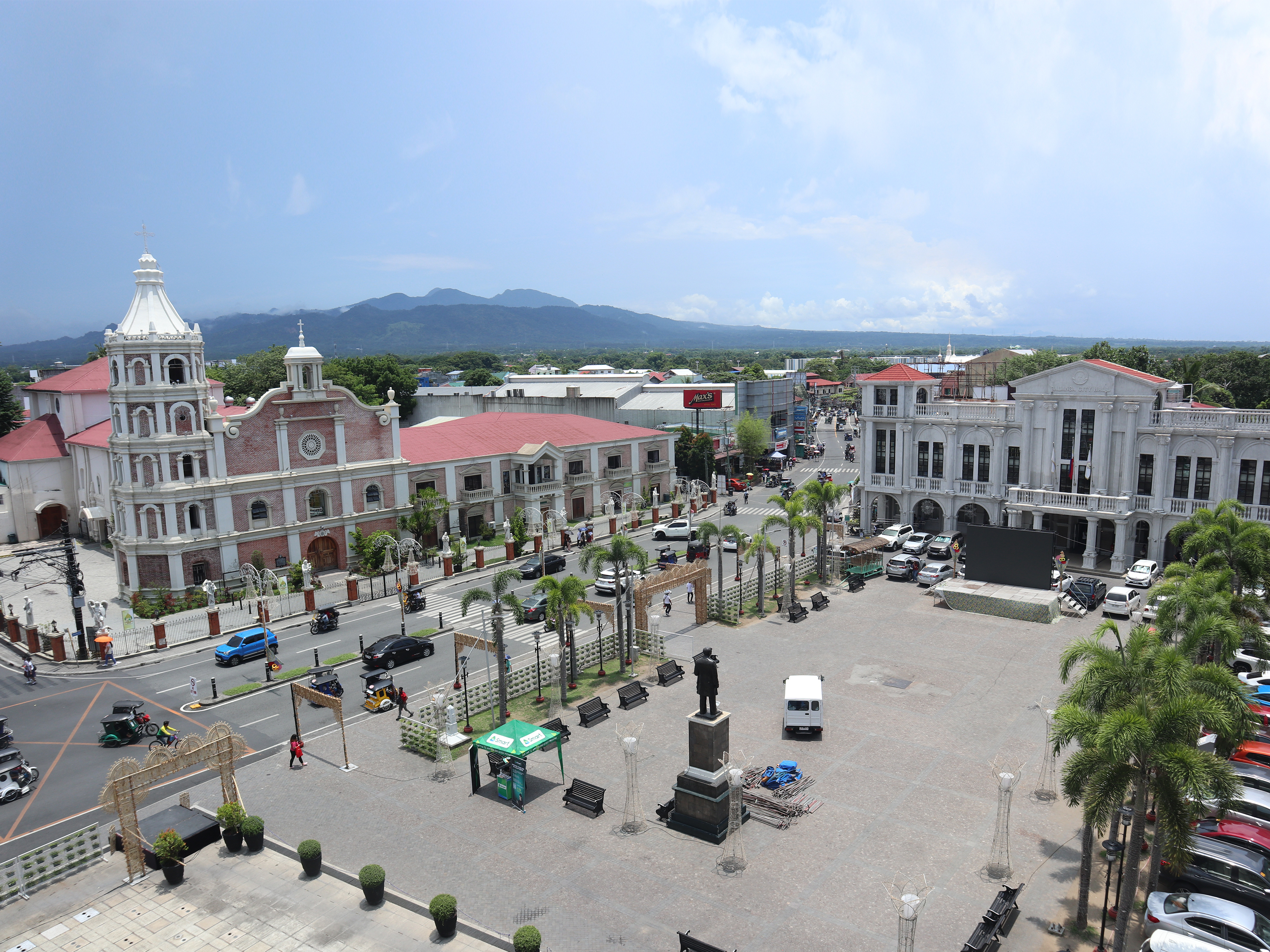
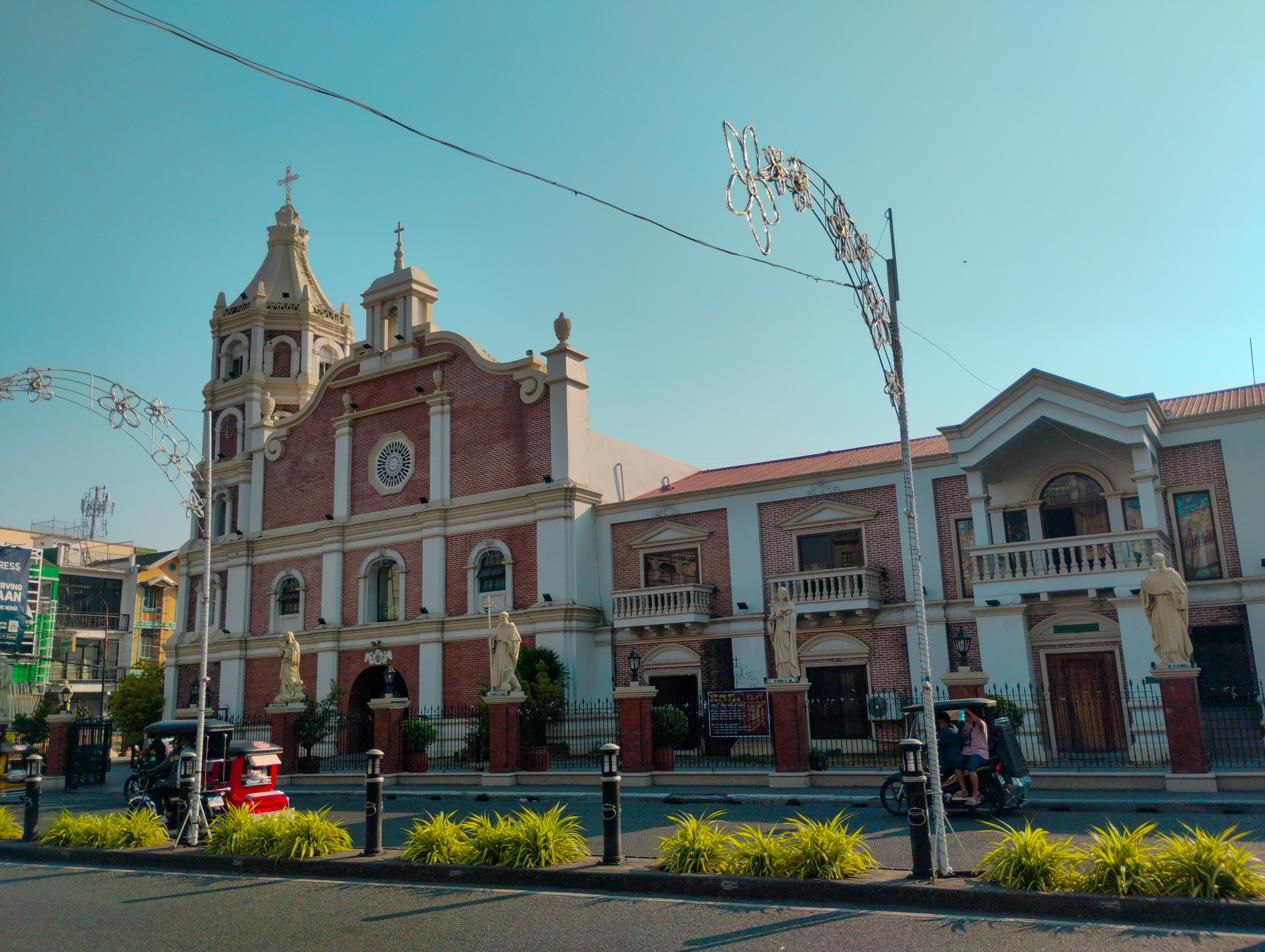
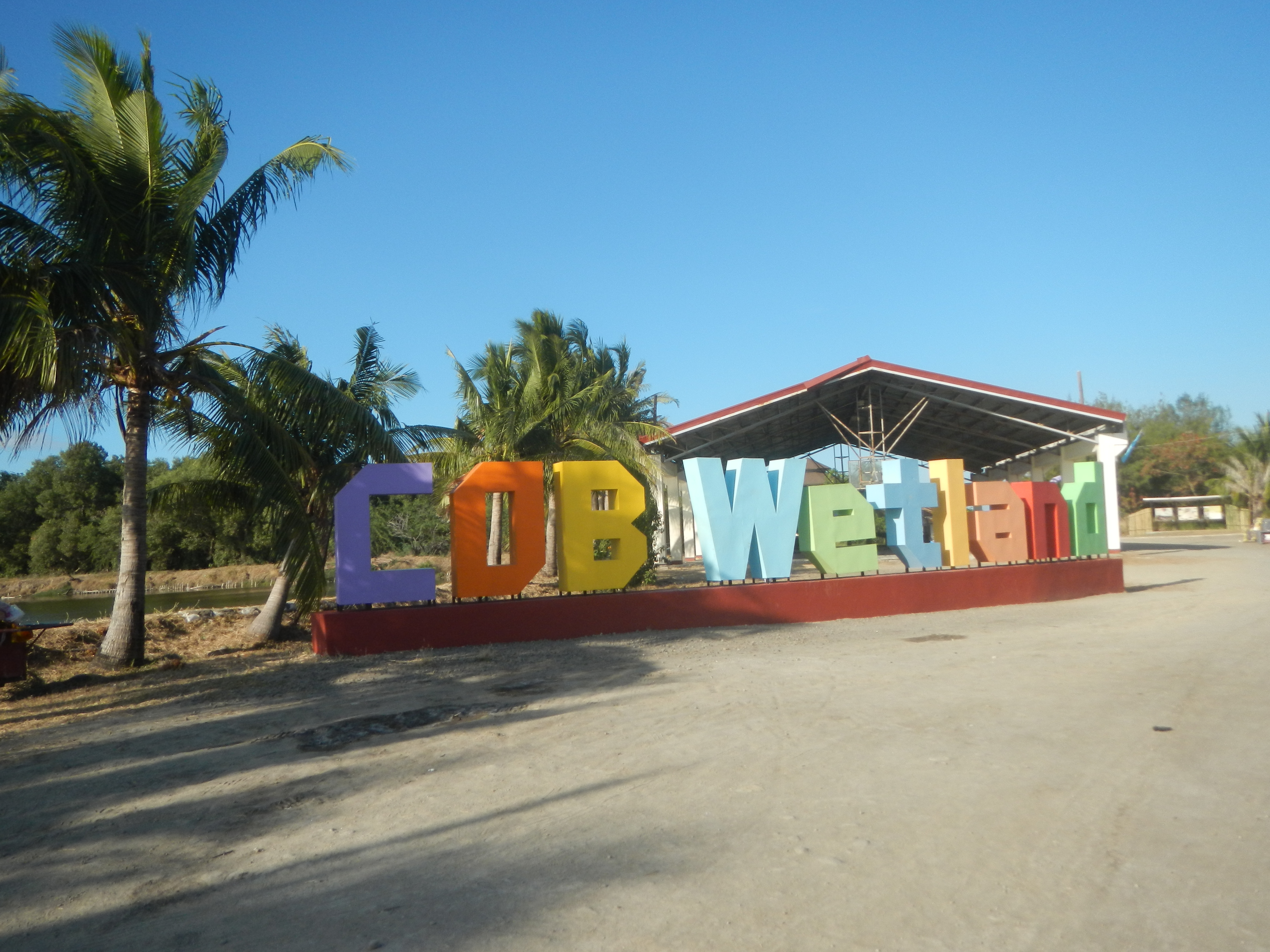
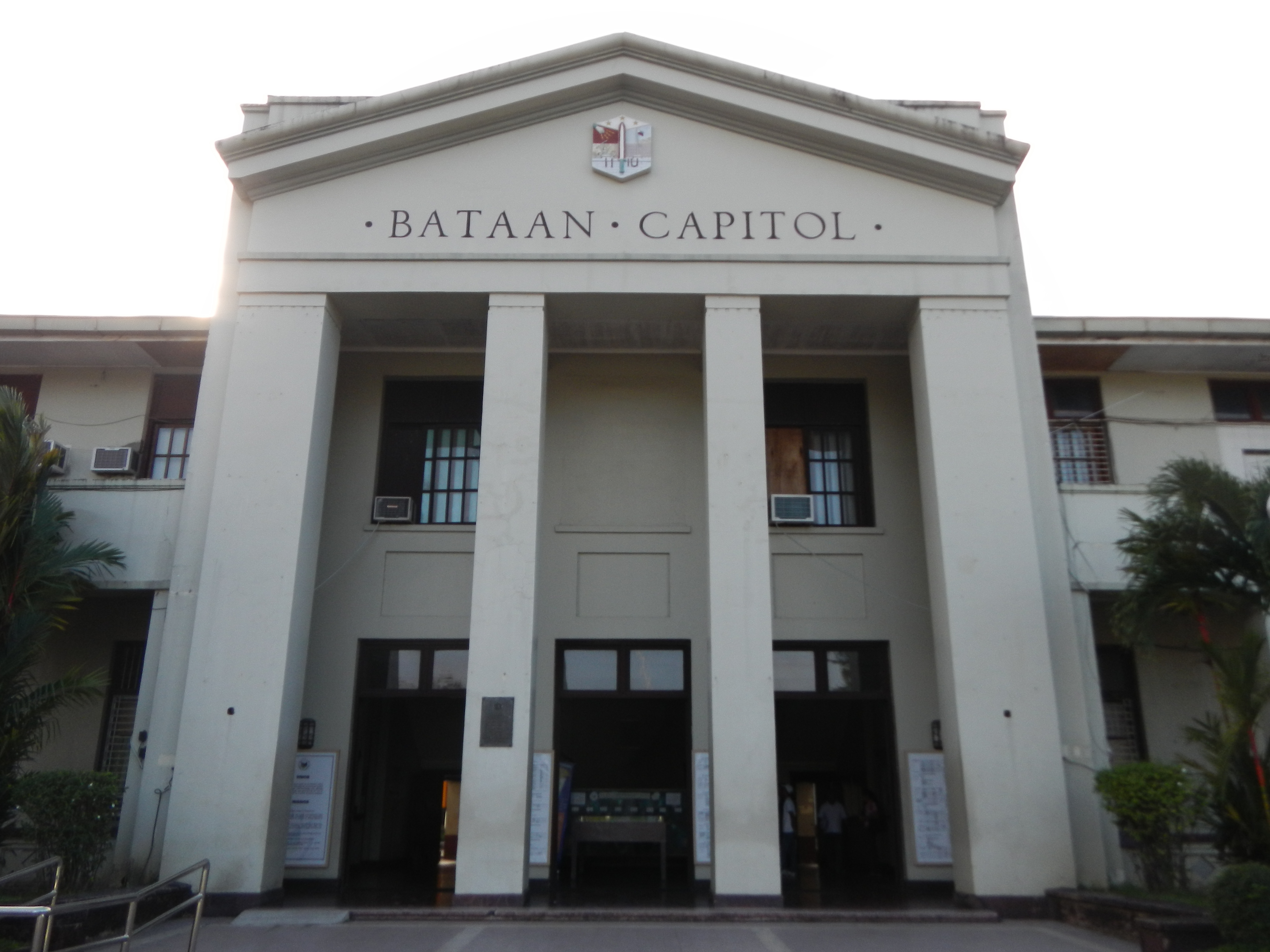
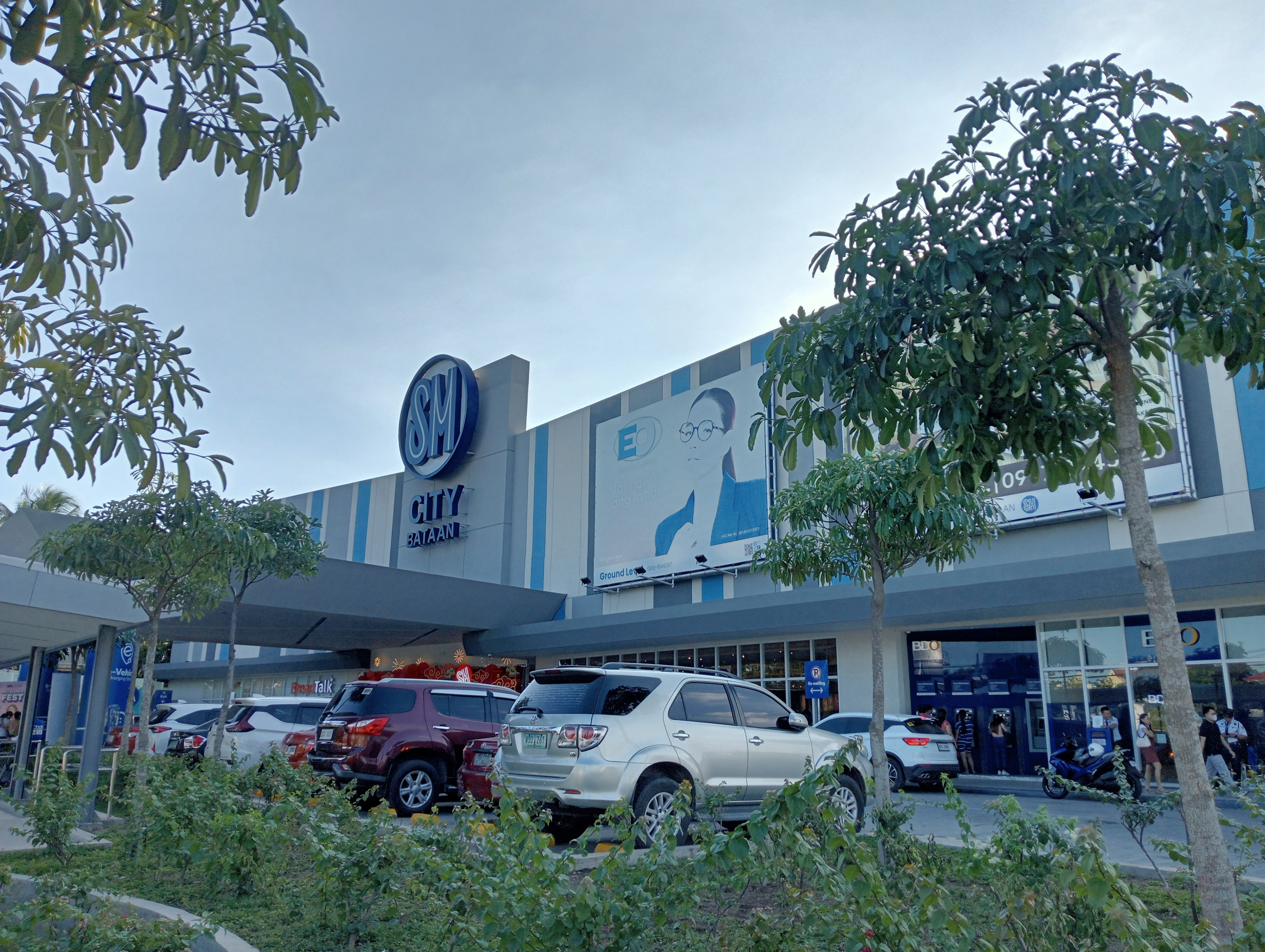
- Poblacion Plaza Mayor Balanga City Hall Balanga Cathedral Balanga Nature and Wetland Park Bataan Provincial Capitol SM City Bataan

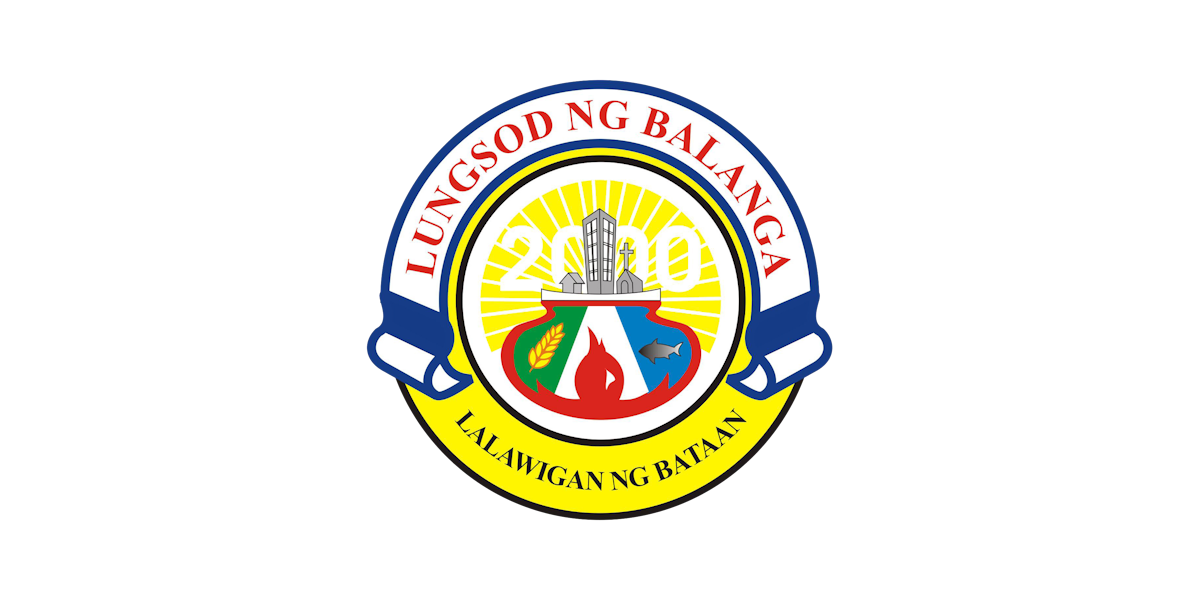
- Flag Seal
- Nicknames: Bataan Capital City; Bataan University Town
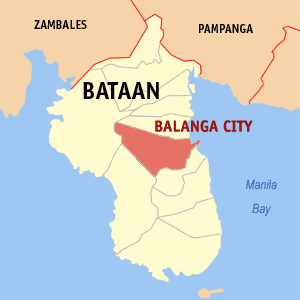
- Map of Bataan with Balanga highlighted
- Interactive map of Balanga
- Location within the Philippines
- Coordinates: 14°41′N 120°32′E
- Country: Philippines
- Region: Central Luzon
- Province: Bataan
- District: 2nd district
- Founded: 1712
- Cityhood: December 30, 2000
- Barangays: 25 (see Barangays)

Government
  - Type: Sangguniang Panlungsod
  - Mayor: Raquel Francis D. Garcia
  - Vice Mayor: Francis Anthony S. Garcia
  - Representative: Albert Raymond S. Garcia
  - City Council: Members: Noel Joseph L. Valdecañas; Jovy Z. Banzon; Christian Laurence Z. Manalaysay; Victor A. Baluyot Jr.; Ma. Liza A. Vasquez; Hubert B. Pizarro; Ricardo M. Magpantay; Jorescel S. Panganiban; Pedro T. Yuzon Jr.; Benigno P. Meriño
  - Electorate: 70,117 voters (2025)

Area
  - Total: 111.63 km^{2} (43.10 sq mi)
- Elevation: 138 m (453 ft)
- Highest elevation: 1,403 m (4,603 ft)
- Lowest elevation: −1 m (−3.3 ft)

Population (2024 census)
  - Total: 109,931
  - Density: 984.78/km^{2} (2,550.6/sq mi)
  - Households: 24,919

Economy
  - Income class: 2nd city income class
  - Poverty incidence: 5.8% (2023)
  - Revenue: ₱ 1,237 million (2024)
  - Assets: ₱ 2,359 million (2024)
  - Expenditure: ₱ 1,069 million (2024)
  - Liabilities: ₱ 696.1 million (2024)

Service provider
  - Electricity: Peninsula Electric Cooperative (PENELCO)
- Time zone: UTC+8 (PST)
- ZIP code: 2100
- PSGC: 030803000
- IDD : area code: +63 (0)47
- Native languages: Mariveleño; Tagalog
- Catholic diocese: Balanga
- Website: www.cityofbalanga.gov.ph

Balanga (pronounced [bɐˈlaŋa]), officially the City of Balanga (Filipino: Lungsod ng Balanga), is a component city and capital of the province of Bataan, Philippines. According to the 2024 census, it has a population of 109,931 people.

Balanga joined the UNESCO Global Network of Learning Cities in 2015.

== Etymology ==
The word Balanga originates from the Kapampangan or Tagalog term balangâ ("clay pot"), which the town produced and which were among the best that can be found in the country. Compare with Calamba, Laguna.

== History ==
Balanga was formerly a village of Abucay before it was established as a mission of the Dominican Order in the Provincial Charter of April 21, 1714, and later declared a vicariate on April 18, 1739, under the patronage of Saint Joseph. Upon the establishment of Bataan as a separate province in 1754, Balanga was made its capital by Governor-General Pedro Manuel de Arandía Santisteban due to its favorable location at the heart of the new territorial jurisdiction. The 1818 Spanish census showed there to be 1,608 native families and 12 Spanish-Filipino families.

On December 30, 2000, Balanga was inaugurated as a city by virtue of Republic Act No. 8984, authored by Congressman Enrique "Tet" Garcia.

The city has extended its urban fringe to the west of the Roman Superhighway, and a new growth center in Barangay Tuyo has been delineated in the Comprehensive Land Use Plan. During the past years, the city saw a high record of residential growth. Consequently, with the expansion of the physical limits of the urban core, as well as the expected large increases in population, and the city's attractiveness to commercial and employment activities, the City Government of Balanga decided to undertake a Master Planning exercise and to propose various developmental projects that would establish Balanga as a well-planned community with quality and character that is innovative and special, although this is currently hindered by an unreliable electricity supply.

== Geography ==
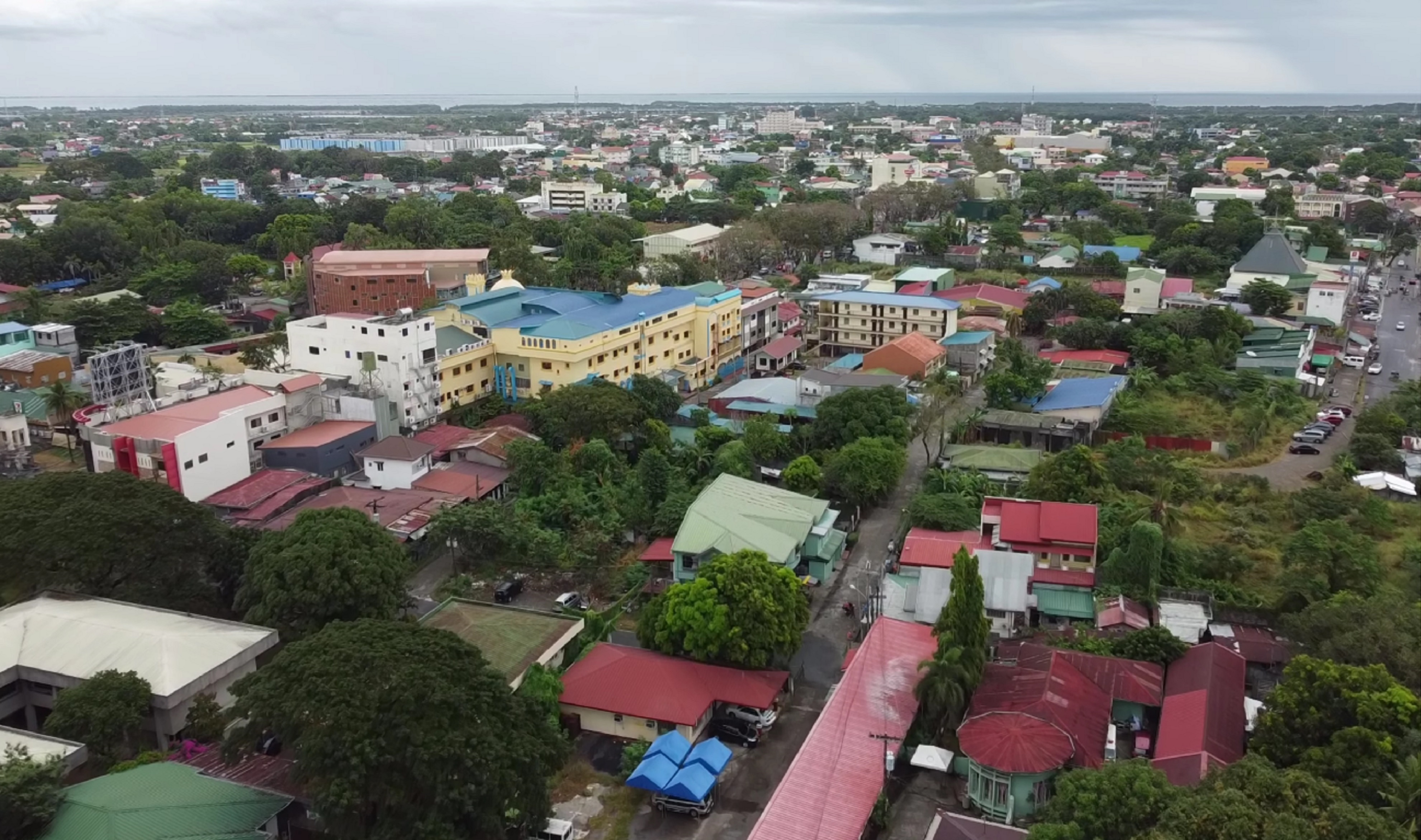
Balanga City downtown

Balanga City is primarily a residential-agricultural city, with a rapidly growing commercial sector. It has a total land area of 11,163 hectares (27,580 acres), which comprises 8.13% of the total land area of Bataan. It is located at the eastern part of the province of Bataan and lies in the southwestern part of Central Luzon. It is bounded inland by the municipality of Abucay in the north, Pilar in the south, the municipalities of Bagac and Morong in the west and Manila Bay in the east. Balanga is 124 kilometres (77 mi) from Manila by land and about 31.2 nautical miles (57.8 km; 35.9 mi) by ferry to Manila.

=== Climate ===
Climate data for Balanga, Bataan
Month	Jan	Feb	Mar	Apr	May	Jun	Jul	Aug	Sep	Oct	Nov	Dec	Year
Mean daily maximum °C (°F)	31 (88)	32 (90)	34 (93)	35 (95)	33 (91)	31 (88)	29 (84)	29 (84)	29 (84)	29 (84)	30 (86)	31 (88)	31 (88)
Mean daily minimum °C (°F)	19 (66)	19 (66)	20 (68)	23 (73)	25 (77)	25 (77)	24 (75)	25 (77)	25 (77)	24 (75)	23 (73)	20 (68)	23 (73)
Average precipitation mm (inches)	7 (0.3)	8 (0.3)	14 (0.6)	26 (1.0)	127 (5.0)	210 (8.3)	263 (10.4)	272 (10.7)	218 (8.6)	114 (4.5)	46 (1.8)	21 (0.8)	1,326 (52.3)
Average rainy days	4.0	4.0	6.9	11.2	21.0	24.5	27.4	26.9	25.9	21.9	13.4	6.3	193.4
Source: Meteoblue (modeled/calculated data, not measured locally)

=== Barangays ===
Balanga is politically subdivided into 25 barangays. Each barangay consists of puroks and some have sitios.

- Bagumbayan
- Cabog-Cabog
- Munting Batangas (Cadre)
- Cataning
- Central
- Cupang Proper
- Cupang West
- Dangcol (Bernabe)
- Ibayo
- Malabia
- Poblacion Barcenas
- Puerto Rivas Ibaba
- Puerto Rivas Itaas
- Puerto Rivas Lote
- San Jose
- Sibacan
- Camacho
- Talisay
- Tanato
- Tenejero
- Tortugas
- Tuyo
- Bagong Silang
- Cupang North
- Doña Francisca

== Demographics ==
Population census of Balanga

Year	Pop.	±% p.a.
1903	7,347	—
1918	8,275	+0.80%
1939	11,684	+1.66%
1948	12,379	+0.64%
1960	18,143	+3.24%
1970	28,484	+4.61%
1975	34,289	+3.79%
1980	39,132	+2.68%

Year	Pop.	±% p.a.
1990	51,512	+2.79%
1995	60,912	+3.19%
2000	71,088	+3.37%
2007	84,105	+2.35%
2010	87,920	+1.63%
2015	96,061	+1.70%
2020	104,173	+1.72%
2024	109,931	+1.30%

Source: Philippine Statistics Authority

The population of Balanga in the 2024 census was 109,931 people, with a density of 980 inhabitants per square kilometre or 2,500 inhabitants per square mile.

== Economy ==
Poverty incidence of Balanga

Source: Philippine Statistics Authority

=== Agriculture and Fisheries ===
The City of Balanga has a total area of 5,698.99 hectares (14,082.5 acres) of land classified for agricultural use. 1,458.55 hectares (3,604.2 acres) of irrigated land, and 1,090.65 hectares (2,695.1 acres) upland, are utilized for crops production. In 2017, 8,144.42 metric tons (8,015.79 long tons; 8,977.69 short tons) of rice were produced.

The city classified 459 hectares (1,130 acres) of land to be utilized for aquaculture. It is composed of 148 hectares (370 acres) of coastal marine area, 276.6 hectares (683 acres) of brackish water fishpond and 34.4 hectares (85 acres) of freshwater fishpond. A total of 172 metric tons (169 long tons; 190 short tons) of marine products with an annual average of 5 metric tons (4.9 long tons; 5.5 short tons) per hectare are produced from freshwater fishponds with tilapia is the most common specie cultured. For brackish water fishponds, 968 metric tons (953 long tons; 1,067 short tons) are produced with an average of 3.5 metric tons (3.4 long tons; 3.9 short tons) per hectare. Some of the species cultured in brackish water are bangus (milkfish), sugpo, vannamei shrimp and alimango (mud crab).

Balanga is well known for its smoked and dried fish products under the One Town One Product (OTOP) program. For the year 2017, there are ninety-nine (99) fish processors in the city mostly located in villages of Tortugas, Sibacan, Puerto Rivas Ibaba and Villa Lina in Barangay Tenejero.

=== Commerce and services ===
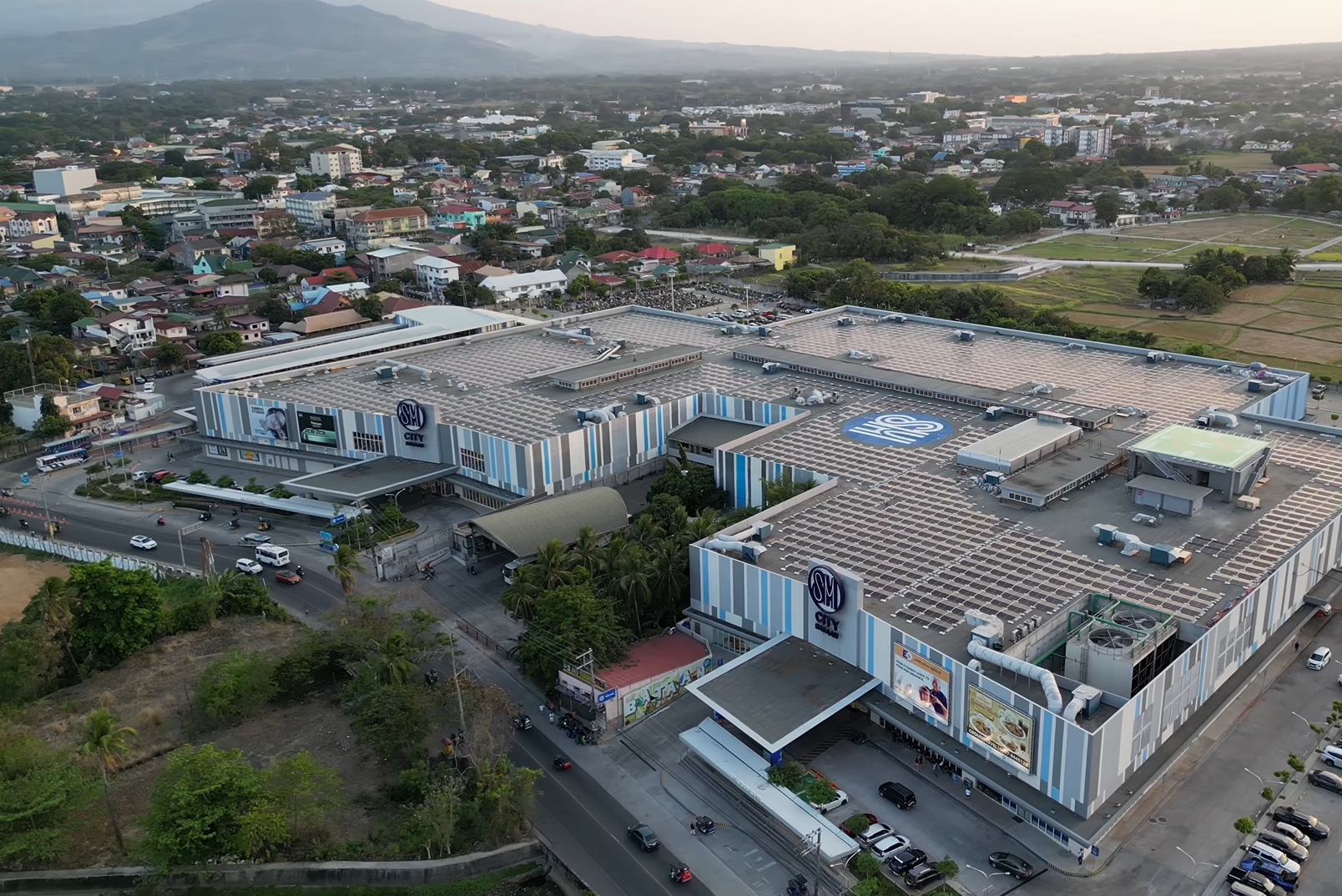
SM City Bataan

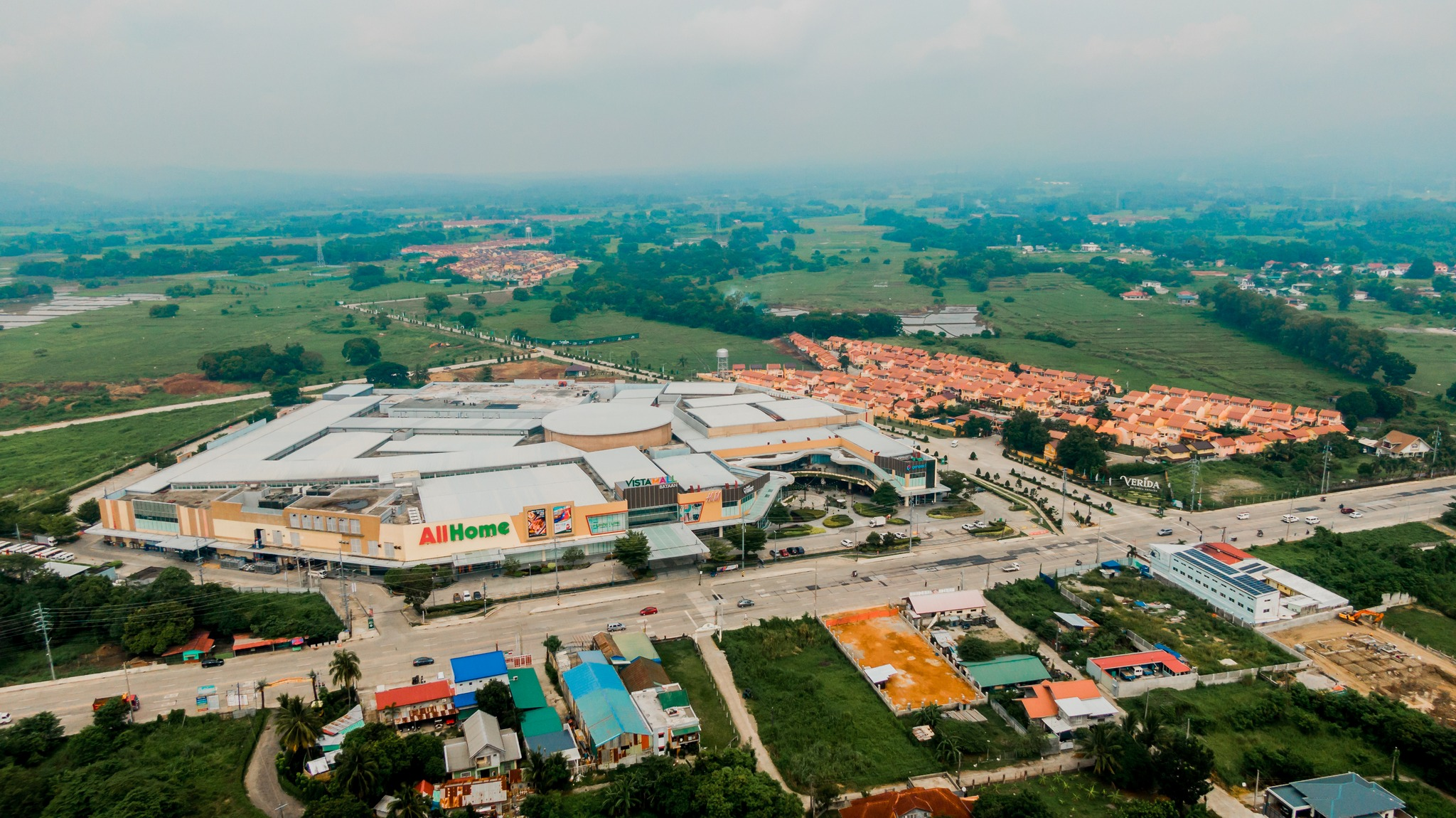
Vista Mall Bataan

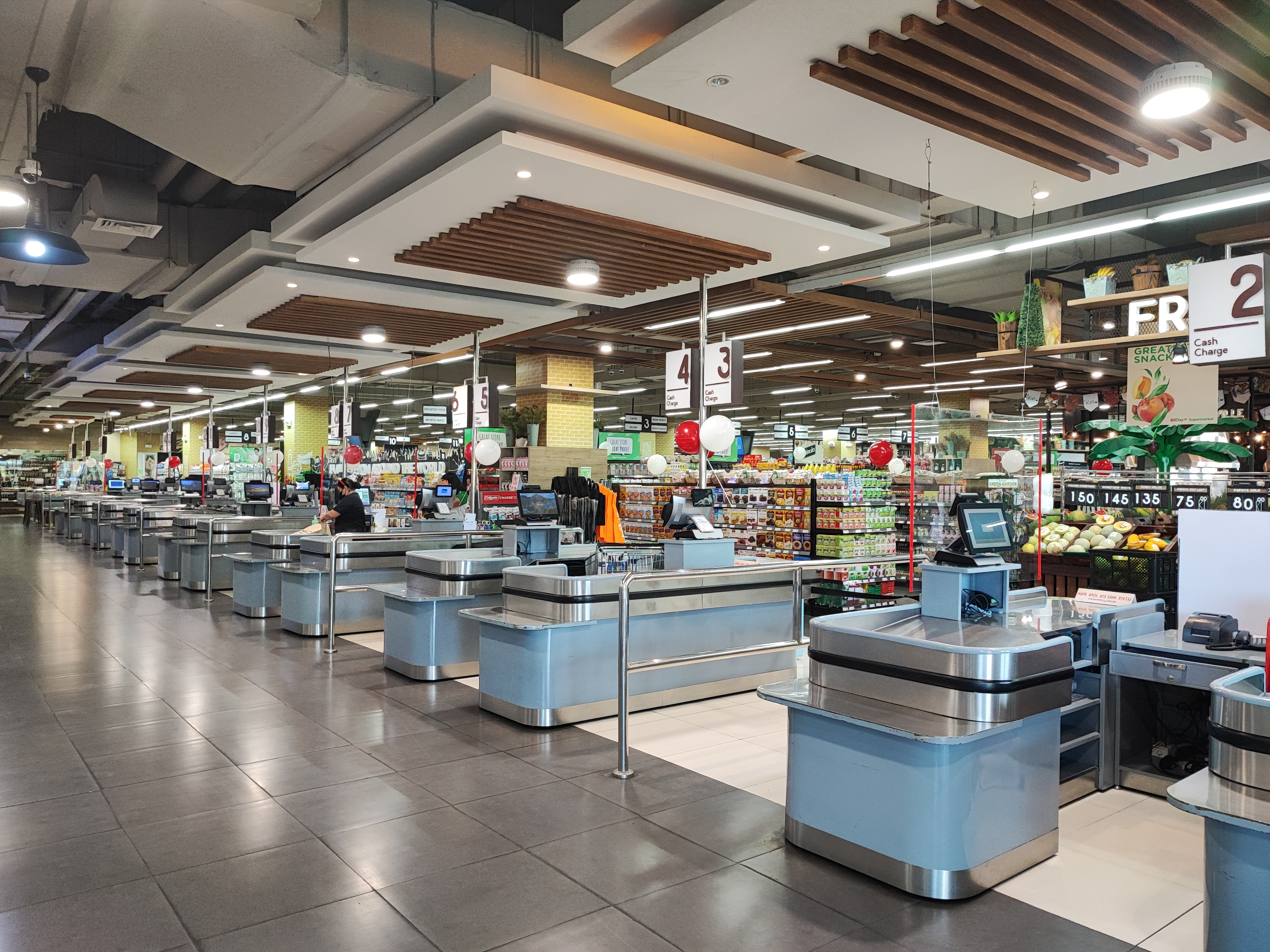
All Day Supermarket in Balanga City before opening

The City of Balanga, while still predominantly agricultural is currently experiencing an accelerated growth in commercial sector. As capital of Bataan, it is the prime commercial hub in the province. Business enterprises are mainly wholesale and retail, servicing, construction, insurance, financing and manufacturing. Retail and trading comprise the largest number of business establishments in this city. Several shopping centers are located in the city, notably SM City Bataan, Vista Mall Bataan, Waltermart Balanga, Capitol Square, Galeria Victoria, Center Plaza Mall, Recar Commercial Complex and Ocampo's Megastore. While Robinsons Place Balanga City's construction is expected to start.

In 2008, 80 hectares (200 acres) of the city's central district was declared as a "University Town" through City Ordinance No. 21, Series of 2008. It aims to encourage the development of Balanga as an emerging hub for start-ups and technology-related businesses in the Philippines.

=== Information Technology ===
The city is one of the twenty-five (25) emerging digital hubs identified by The Digital Cities 2025 program by the Department of Information and Communications Technology (DICT), Information Technology and Business Process Association of the Philippines (IBPAP), and Leechiu Property Consultants, Inc. (LPC). It hosts several business process outsourcing (BPO) companies such as Genpact, Boston-based start-up Botkeeper, and Australia-based Yoonet.

=== Public-Private Partnership ===
To further improve its revenue generation capability, the City Government entered into several public–private partnership (PPP) projects, such as the Galeria Victoria, the Plaza Property which develops the city's main plaza, and the Capitol Square mall.

== Government ==
=== Local government ===
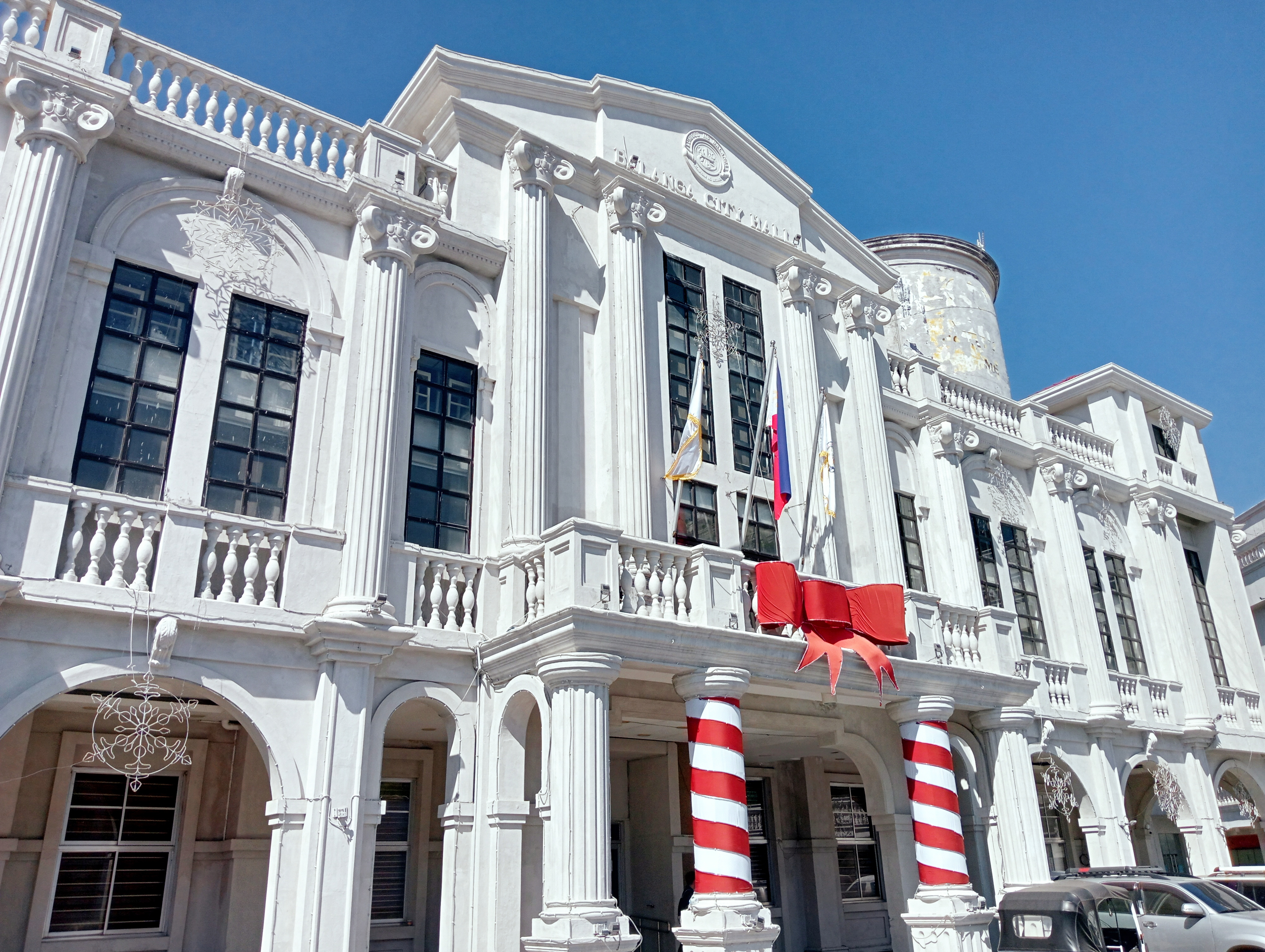
City Hall

Pursuant to the Local government in the Philippines", the political seat of the municipal government is located at the City Hall. In the History of the Philippines (1521–1898), the Gobernadorcillo is the Chief Executive who holds office in the Presidencia. During the period of American rule (1898–1946) (History of the Philippines (1898-1946)), the elected Mayor and local officials, including the appointed ones, hold office at the Municipal Town or City Hall. The legislative and executive departments perform their functions in the Sangguniang Panglungsod (Session Hall) and the Regional and Metropolitan Trial Courts, respectively, and are located in the second floor of the City Hall and in the Halls of Justice.

=== Elected officials ===
Members of the Balanga City Council (2022–2025)
Position	Name of official
District Representative (2nd Legislative District, Bataan)	Jose Enrique S. Garcia III
City Mayor	Francis S. Garcia
City Vice Mayor	Vianca Lita V. Gozon
City Councilors	Noel Valdecañas
City Councilors	Jett Nisay
City Councilors	Vic Baluyot
City Councilors	Elmo Sanchez
City Councilors	Hubert Pizarro
City Councilors	Karl Paguio
City Councilors	Joy Panganiban
City Councilors	Carding Magpantay
City Councilors	Tony Tranate
City Councilors	Benjie Meriño

- Mayor: Francis S. Garcia (National Unity)
- Vice Mayor: Vianca Lita V. Gozon (National Unity)
- Councilors:

=== Administration ===
The City administration envisions the City of Balanga as U-Town, a World Class University Town in 2020 (City Ordinance No. 21, Series of 2008, "Declaring the eighty point forty-two (80.42) hectares at the city's central district as University Town in the City of Balanga, Bataan").

Balanga listed a 'Record-Breaking' P6B Investments In 2012. Balanga City won the 1st Robredo ICT Awards.

=== Former mayors ===
Mayor	Term
Tomas B. Gallardo	1901–1903
Angel Mendoza	1903–1907
Antonio Tuason Sr.	1907–1909
Amado de Leon	1909–1912
Andres de Leon	1912–1916
Jose P. Banzon	1916–1919
Venacio Banzon	1919–1928
Antonio Tuason Sr. (2nd Term)	1928–1931
Venacio Banzon (2nd Term)	1931–1934
Mariano Batungbacal	1934–1937
Mariano Herrera	1938–1942
Mariano Batungbacal (2nd Term)	1942–1943
Numeriano Quindoy	1943–1944
Carlos Y. Gonzales	1944–1945
Mariano Herrera (2nd Term)	1945–1946
Jose N. Gonzales	1946–1947
Graciano Pastorfide	1947
Pedro R. Dizon	1948–1951
Crispulo Torrico	1951
Faustino V. Vigo	1952–1955
Pedro R. Dizon (2nd Term)	1956–1959
Emilio Bernabe	1960–1963
Vicente Malibiran	1964–1967
Teodoro Camacho III	1968–1971
Celso Valdecañas	1972–1979
Teodoro R. Alonzo	1980–1986
Teodoro Camacho III (2nd Term)	1986–1987
Melanio S. Banzon Jr.	1988–1998
Albert S. Garcia	1998–2004
Melanio S. Banzon Jr. (2nd Term)	2004–2007
Jose Enrique Garcia III	2007–2016
Francis Anthony S. Garcia	2016–2025

== Tourism ==
=== Parks and Public Spaces ===
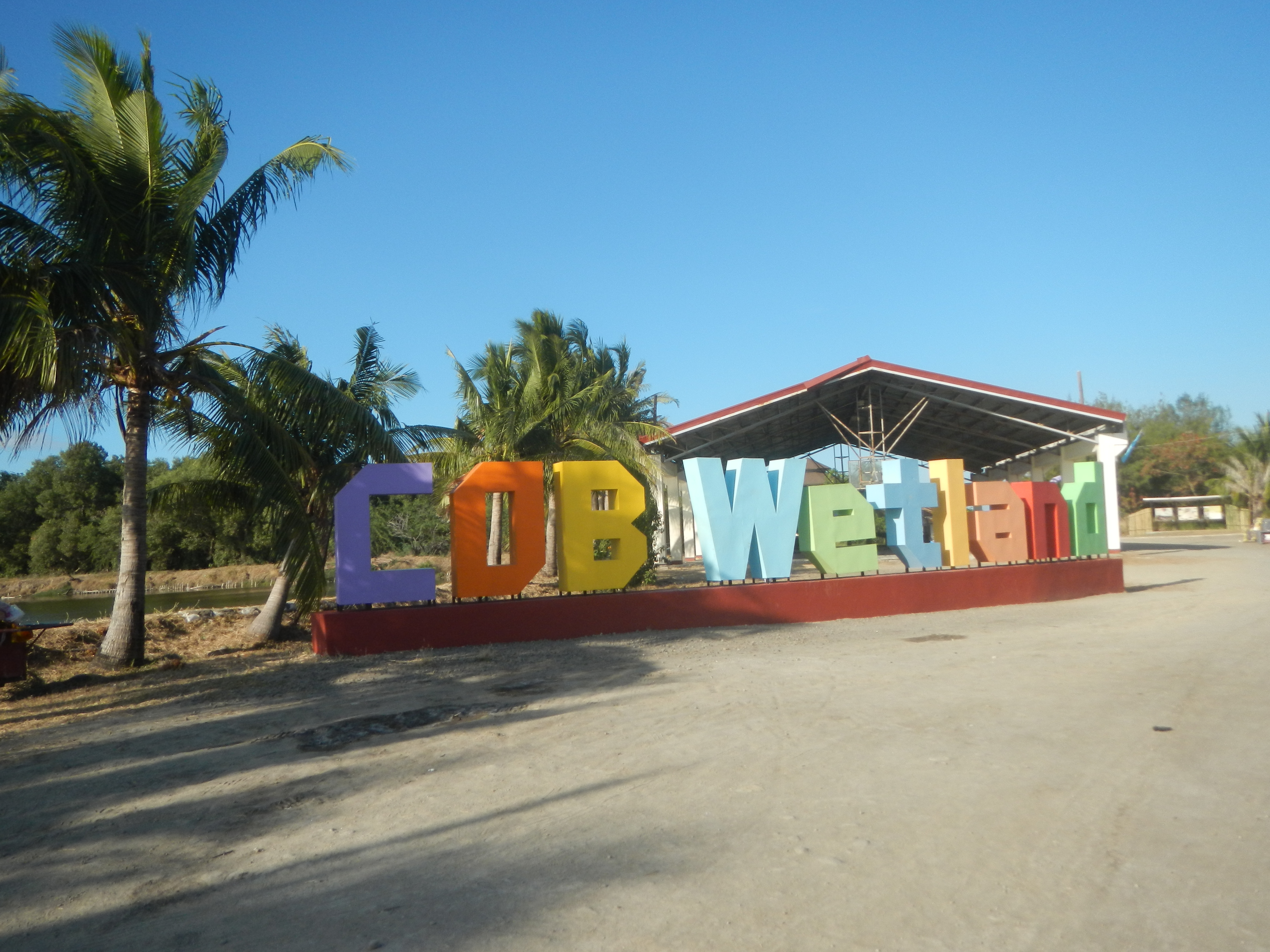
Balanga Nature and Wetland Park, 2018

Bataan Tourism Park

- Balanga Wetland and Nature Park. Site of the “Ibong Dayo” festival since 2005, the 11-hectare Park, situated along the East Asian–Australasian Flyway in Barangay Tortugas was founded by Tet Garcia and the Wild Bird Club of the Philippines, President Michael Lu. It became a community-based ecotourism zone per Republic Act 11365 or "Balanga Wetland and Nature Park Responsible Ecotourism Act" signed by Rodrigo Duterte on August 8, 2019.
- Plaza Major de Balanga - Poblacion
- Bataan Capitol Center - San Jose
- Bataan Tourism Park - Tenejero
- Doña Francisca Public Park - Doña Francisca

=== Historical Places ===
- Surrender of Bataan Site Marker - Talisay
- Bataan World War II Museum - Talisay

=== Churches ===
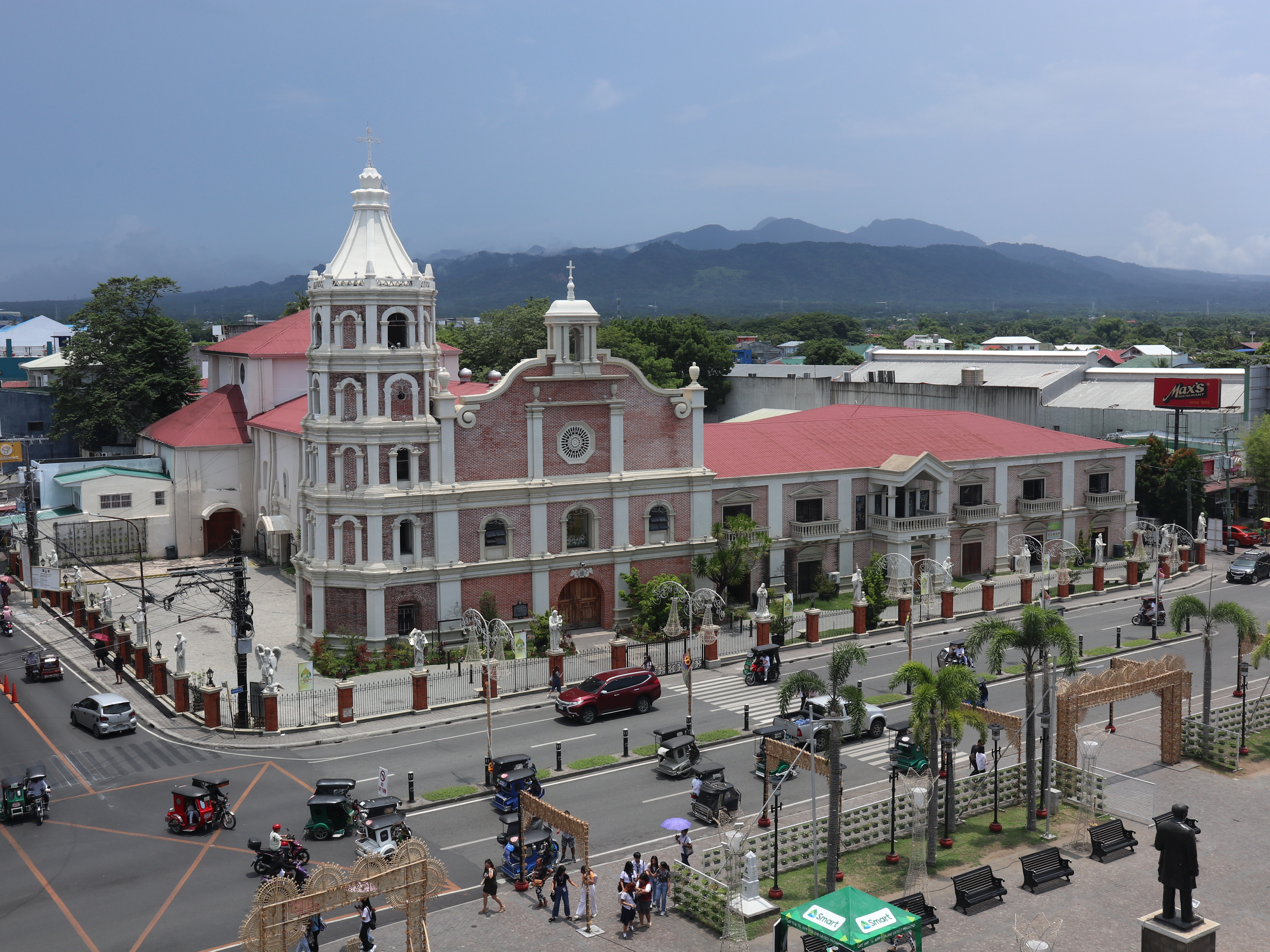
Balanga Cathedral

- Balanga Cathedral (Cathedral-Shrine and Parish of St. Joseph)
- Divine Mercy Shrine of Diocese Balanga
- Santo Cristo Parish Church - Paterno Street, Cupang West
- San Roque Chapel - National Road, Tuyo
- The Risen Lord Chapel - Cuaderno Street, Doña Francisca
- Immaculate Conception Parish Church - Jose P. Rizal Street, Puerto Rivas Ibaba
- Residencia Sacerdotal-Guadalupe Chapel - Fiscal Camacho Street, Tenejero
- Poor Clare Monastery of the Holy Spirit- Upper Tuyo, Balanga City
- Virgen Milagrosa del Rosario College Seminary Chapel- Upper Tuyo, Balanga City
- Our Lady of Mt. Carmel Chapel- Bahay Puso Compound, Upper Tuyo, Balanga City

== Transportation ==
List of accredited transport cooperatives as of January 2021:

- Balanga-Orani Transport Service MultiPurpose Cooperative (BOTSMPC)
- Bataan Jeepney Operators and Drivers Transport Service Cooperative
- Bataan United Bus Transport Service Cooperative
- Marbalolo Transport Service Cooperative
- Roadline Transport Service Cooperative

== Healthcare ==
=== Healthcare facilities ===
Access to health services in the city is adequate with the presence of one government owned general hospital and four private hospitals.

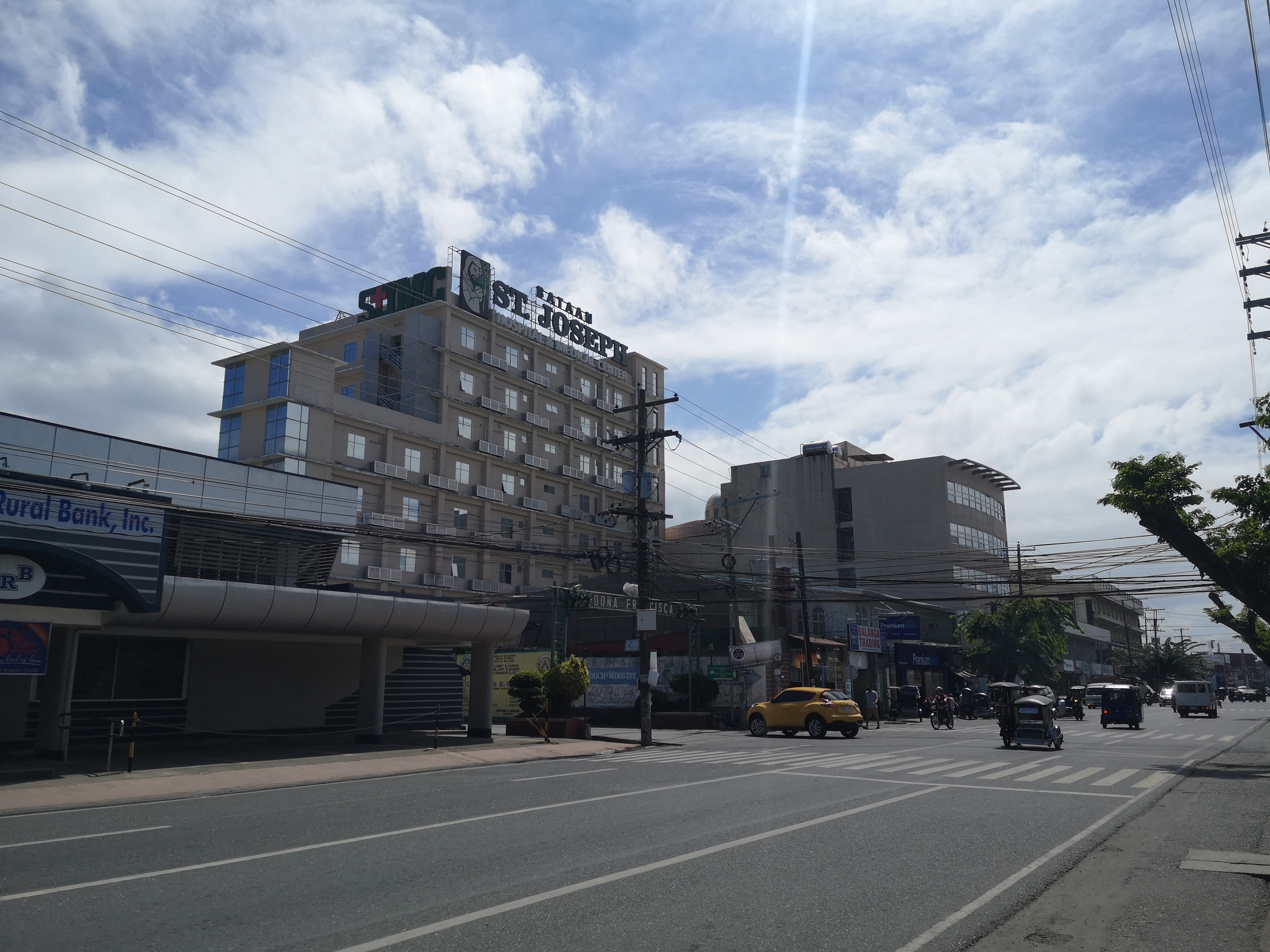
Saint Joseph Hospital and Medical Center - Balanga

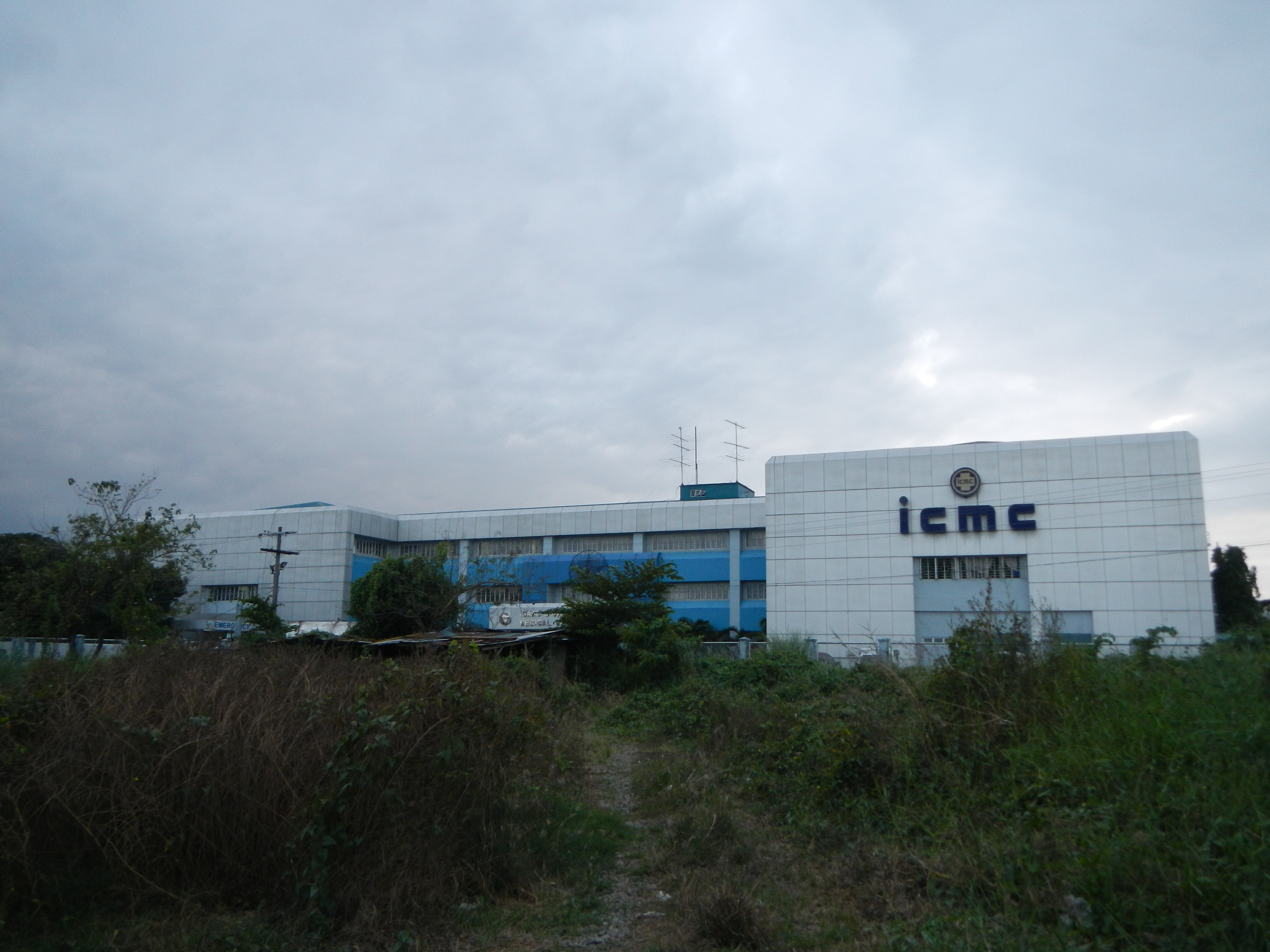
Isaac Catalina Medical Center

- Bataan Doctors Hospital and Medical Center - Cuaderno Street, Brgy. Doña Francisca
- Bataan General Hospital and Medical Center (a DOH regional hospital) - Manahan Street, Brgy. Tenejero
- Isaac Catalina Medical Center - Calero Street, Brgy. Poblacion
- Centro Medico de Santisimo del Rosario - Roman Superhighway, Tenejero
- Saint Joseph Hospital and Medical Center - Don Manuel Banzon Avenue, Brgy. Poblacion - On December 15, 2023, the first A.I.-powered catheterization laboratory (CathLab) in the Central Luzon region was inaugurated in this hospital, enhancing the capability in treating vascular, cardiac, oncologic, and neurological (VCON) problems.
- Balanga Medical Center (formerly Bataan Women's Hospital) - Palmera Street, Brgy. San Jose
- Balanga Medical Center-Four Lanes (under construction) - National Road corner E. Garcia Sr. Avenue, Tuyo

The City of Balanga also has one City Health Office (CHO) and four (4) functional PhilHealth-accredited Rural Health Units (RHU). RHU 1 in San Jose houses the Basic Emergency Maternal and New Born Care Facility. While the Newborn Screening (NBS) facility is located in RHU 3 in Barangay Cupang Proper. RHU 4 in Barangay Tenejero is the newest, established in March 2017. These government-owned facilities provide free pre-natal, delivery and post natal services, family planning, women's health and safe motherhood counseling, control of diarrheal diseases, expanded program on immunization, control of acute respiratory illness, TB Dots clinic, diabetic clinic and STD AIDS social hygiene clinic. These are augmented by 22 smaller barangay health stations and one Dental Bus making health care more accessible to a greater number of the city residents. Numerous privately owned medical facilities can also be found all over the city. These include 19 medical and 19 dental clinics, 14 laboratory and diagnostic centers and 10 beauty and skin care facilities.

=== Comprehensive Smoke-Free Policy ===
Being a Hall of Fame Awardee of the Department of Health's Red Orchid Award, the City of Balanga is strictly implementing the Smoke-Free Policy. Regular anti–smoking campaign for colleges, university and schools, and orientation on health ordinances are conducted regularly across the city. The Comprehensive No Smoking Ordinance of the City of Balanga prohibits the sale, distribution, usage, and promotion of all tobacco products and electronic nicotine delivery system (ENDS) also known as "vape", within the declared University Town area and within the three (3) kilometers radius of the city.

To ensure and expand the city's strong advocacy for 100% tobacco-free environment, the City Government launched the Tobacco-Free Generation (TFG) Campaign last December 2015. It is intended to secure the Millennials’ (those who were born from the year 2000 and onwards) commitment to not smoke. With this program, the City of Balanga was awarded with “World Health Recognition for Heath Cities Best Practice, Youth Engagement to Promote Tobacco Control” last August 29, 2016.

== Education ==
The Balanga City Schools Division Office governs all educational institutions within the municipality. It oversees the management and operations of all private and public, from primary to secondary schools.

=== Secondary schools ===
The city hosts the biggest public secondary school in the province, Bataan National High School. Other public secondary schools present are Balanga City National Science High School, City of Balanga National High School and the Bataan Integrated School. While private secondary schools in the city include the high school departments of Asia Pacific College of Advanced Studies, Bataan Infant Jesus School, Bataan Montessori School, Inc., Tomas del Rosario College and St. Joseph Colleges of Balanga.

=== Higher educational institutions ===
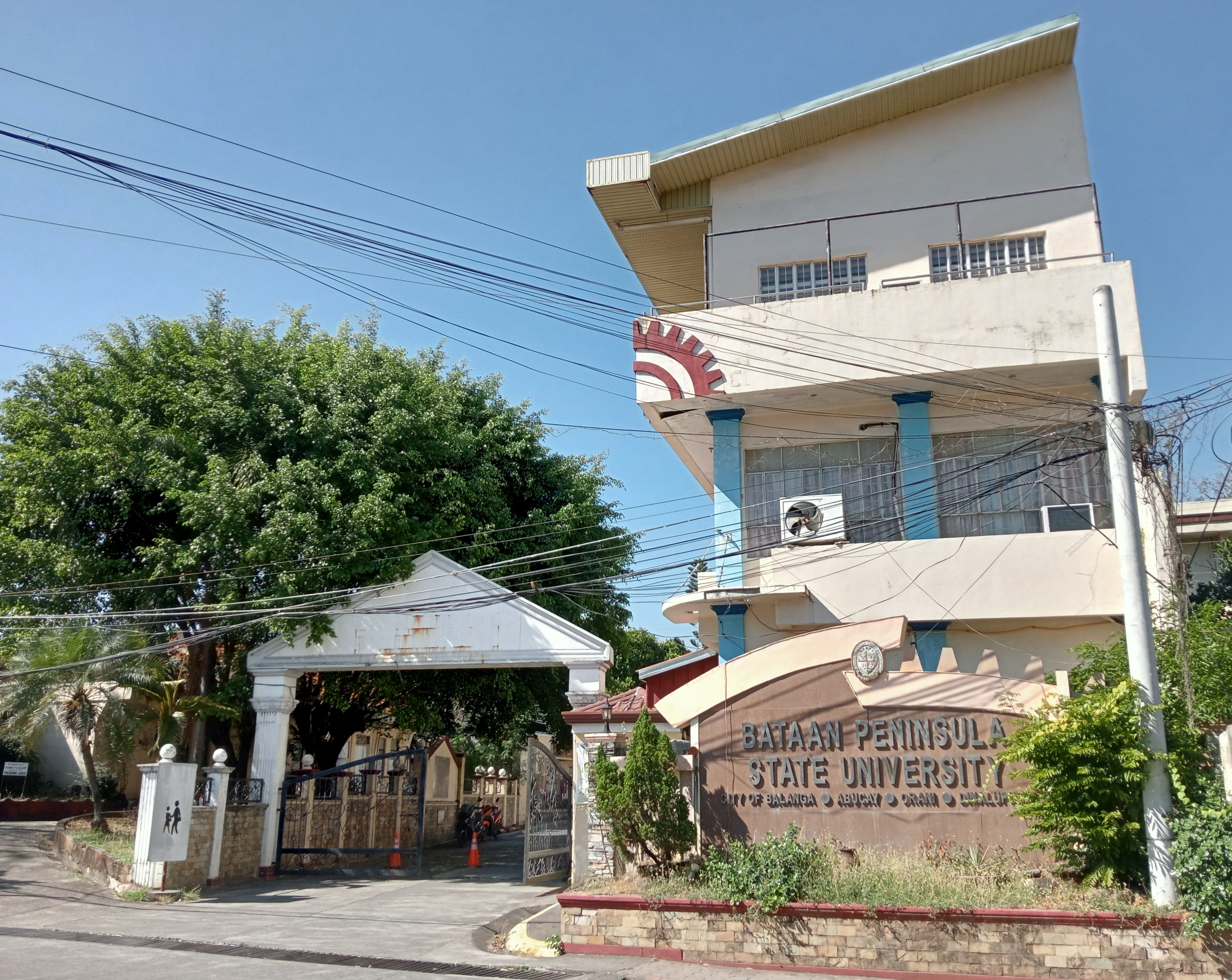
Bataan Peninsula State University

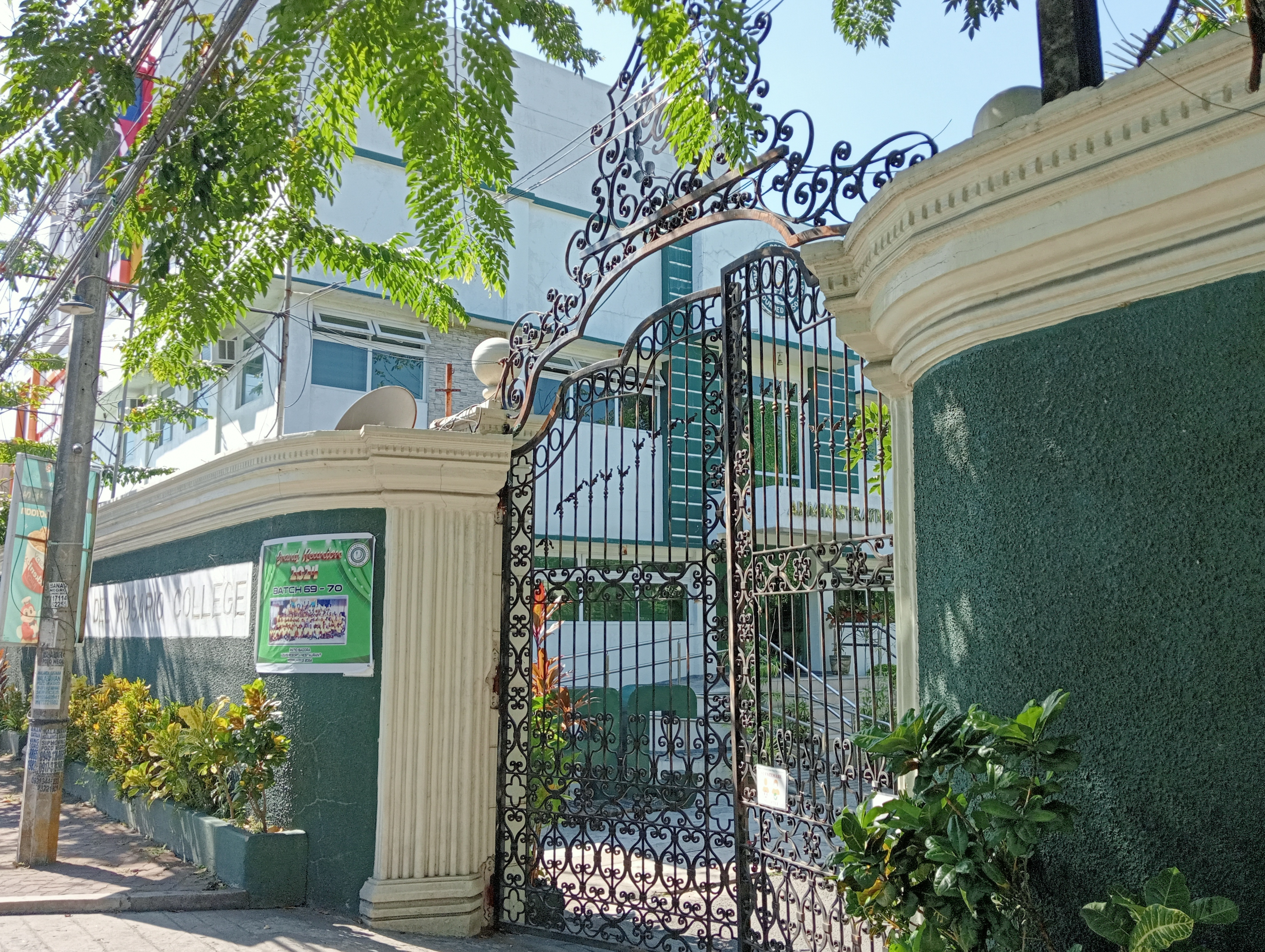
Tomas del Rosario College

Balanga City is the educational center of the province of Bataan. It currently has one state-owned university and several private colleges offering Baccalauréat degrees in accountancy, business administration, entrepreneurship, computer science and information technology, teaching, engineering, architecture, and health.

Bataan Peninsula State University, a state-owned institution, has its two biggest campuses located in the city: the main campus in the capitol compound, and a satellite campus located in downtown area.

Tomas del Rosario College is one of the oldest private educational institutions in the city. It is located in the Capitol Drive in Barangay San Jose. The other private colleges in the city include Asia Pacific College of Advanced Studies, Eastwoods Professional College of Science and Technology (formerly SOFTNET College of Science and Technology), Bataan Heroes Memorial College, Microcity Computer College and St. Joseph's College.

Other higher educational institutions in the city of Balanga include: AMA Computer Learning Center, Philippine Women's University-CDCEC Bataan, Bataan Maritime Institute, and Proclesia International Incorporated.

== Notable personalities ==
- Albert Garcia - 24th Governor of Bataan, current representative of Bataan's Second District, and former Mayor of Balanga.
- Cesar Banzon Bautista - was the 13th Ambassador of the Republic of the Philippines to the United Kingdom and was the Secretary of Trade and Industry from 1996 to 1998.
- Chito Jaime - Filipino professional basketball player who plays for the Muntinlupa Cagers of the Maharlika Pilipinas Basketball League and the Philippine Basketball Association.
- Elisse Joson - Filipina actress, endorser, model and businesswoman
- Janine Tugonon - Miss Universe 2012 1st runner-up
- Jose Enrique S. Garcia III - 25th Governor of Bataan, former representative of Bataan's Second District, and former Mayor of Balanga.
- Jose Acuzar - also known as "Jerry" Acuzar, is a prominent real estate businessman. He founded and owns New San Jose Builders, Inc, Manuel L. Quezon University in Quezon City, and the renowned heritage resort Las Casas Filipinas de Acuzar. On July 29, 2022, newly elected President Bongbong Marcos appointed him as Secretary of Housing Settlements and Urban Development.
- Jose Isidro Camacho - economist who served as the Philippines' Secretary of Energy and later on as Secretary of Finance under President Gloria Macapagal Arroyo. He is also a member of the Group of Experts of the ASEAN Capital Markets Forum, Singapore's Securities Industry Council, and the International Advisory Panel of the Securities Commission of Malaysia.
- Julian Banzon - Filipino biochemist and National Scientist of the Philippines.
- Leonila dela Fuente Dans - is a medical researcher and consultant. Her book, "Painless Evidence-Based Medicine", which she co-wrote with husband Dr. Antonio L. Dans and Dr. Maria Asuncion A. Silvestre, is a bestseller among rheumatologists. Her researches include “Randomized Controlled Trial and Cost Benefit Analysis-Zinc Implementation for Acute Diarrhea” for children less than five years old, and the “Utilization of Clinical Practice Guidelines in the Philippines.”
- Luz Magsaysay - wife of Philippine President Ramon Magsaysay and the seventh First Lady of the Philippines.
- Miguel Cuaderno Sr. - was the 17th Finance Secretary of the Philippines under Manuel Roxas and the first Governor of the Central Bank of the Philippines from 1949 to 1960. He was also a constitutionalist being one of the “Seven Wise Men” who drafted the 1935 Philippine Constitution.
- Norberto Gonzales - was the Secretary of National Defense (July 2, 2007 – August 7, 2007), and National Security Advisor (February 2005 – July 2, 2007)
- Orlando Banzon Vea - commonly known as Doy Vea in the tech sector, co-founded Smart Communications along with David Fernando in 1991. He has since moved to several positions, including chief executive officer, President and Director of PLDT Communications and Energy Ventures as well as CEO, President and Director of DigiTel (Sun Cellular).
- Oscar V. Cruz - Fourth Archbishop of Roman Catholic Archdiocese of Lingayen-Dagupan (July 15, 1991 – November 4, 2009)
- Oscar Joson - was the youngest Filipino to receive the US Congressional Gold Medal for bravery and sacrifice of own life. He was a 14-year old Boy Scout who died in Balanga during the early days of World War II.
- Pedro Tuason - was the Solicitor General of the Philippines (1921), he also served as Justice Secretary during the administration of President Ramon Magsaysay.
- Romi Garduce - first Filipino to climb the Seven Summits.
- Teodoro Bacani Jr. - First Bishop of the Roman Catholic Diocese of Novaliches (January 16 – November 25, 2003).

== See also ==
- Roman Catholic Diocese of Balanga

First	Capital of Bataan; 1754–present	Incumbent
