= Bataan General Hospital and Medical Center =

Government hospital in Bataan, Philippines

Geography
- Location: Balanga, Bataan, Central Luzon, Philippines
- Coordinates: 14°40′42″N 120°31′50″E

Organization
- Funding: Government hospital
- Type: tertiary level hospital

Services
- Beds: 1,000

Links
- Website: bataangeneralhospital.doh.gov.ph

The Bataan General Hospital and Medical Center (formerly Bataan Provincial Hospital) is a tertiary level government hospital in the Philippines with a bed capacity of 1,000. It is located along Manahan Street, Tenejero, Balanga.
