= Tomas del Rosario College =

Private college in Bataan, Philippines

- Dalubhasaang Tomas del Rosario (Filipino)
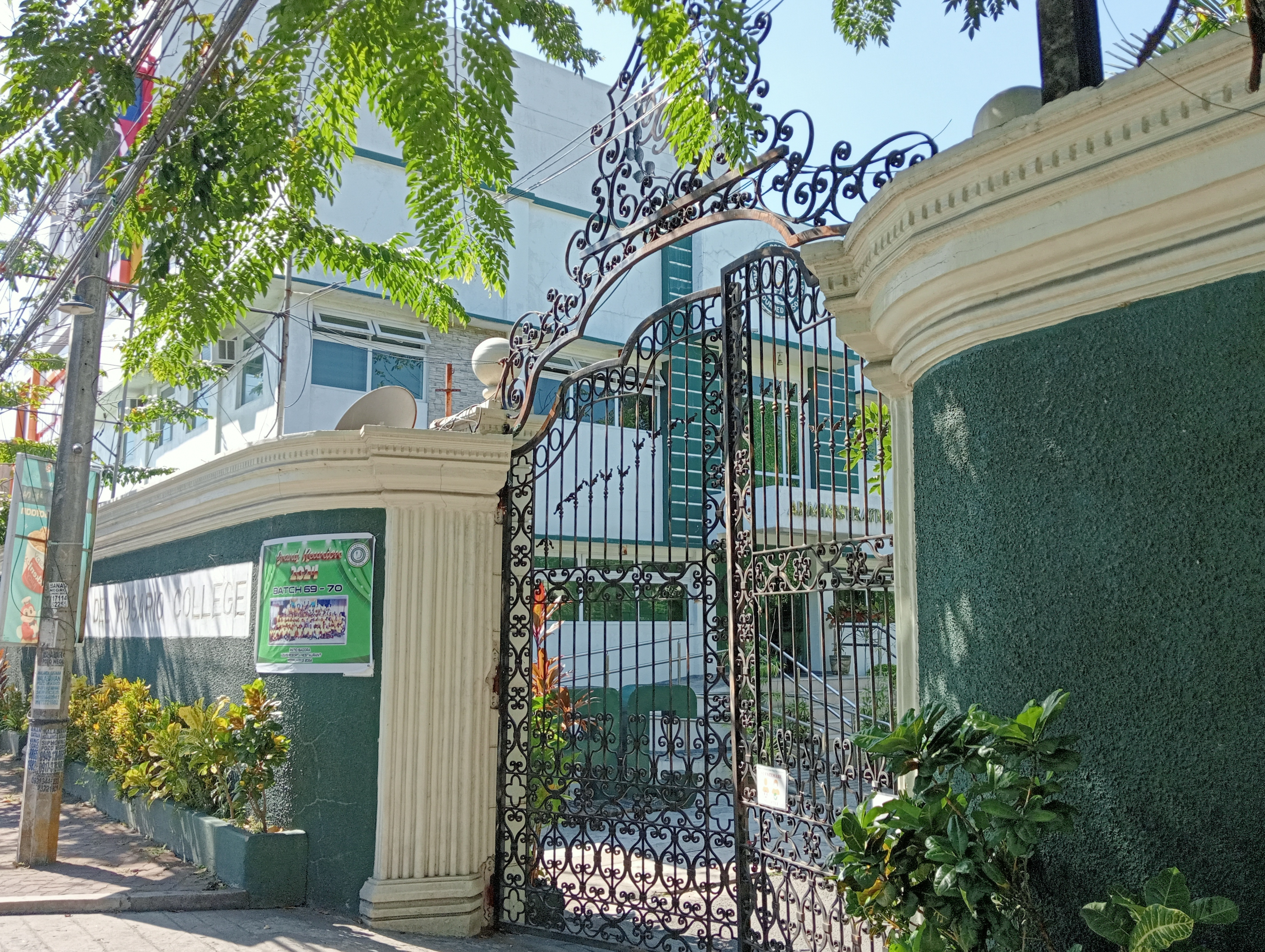
- Type: Private; Nonsectarian
- Established: 1950
- Location: Balanga, Bataan, Philippines; 14°40′41″N 120°32′14″E
- Campus: San Jose Drive, Balanga, Bataan
- Colors: Green Gold White
- Nickname: T.del or TRC
- Website: www.trc.edu.ph
- Location in Luzon Location in the Philippines

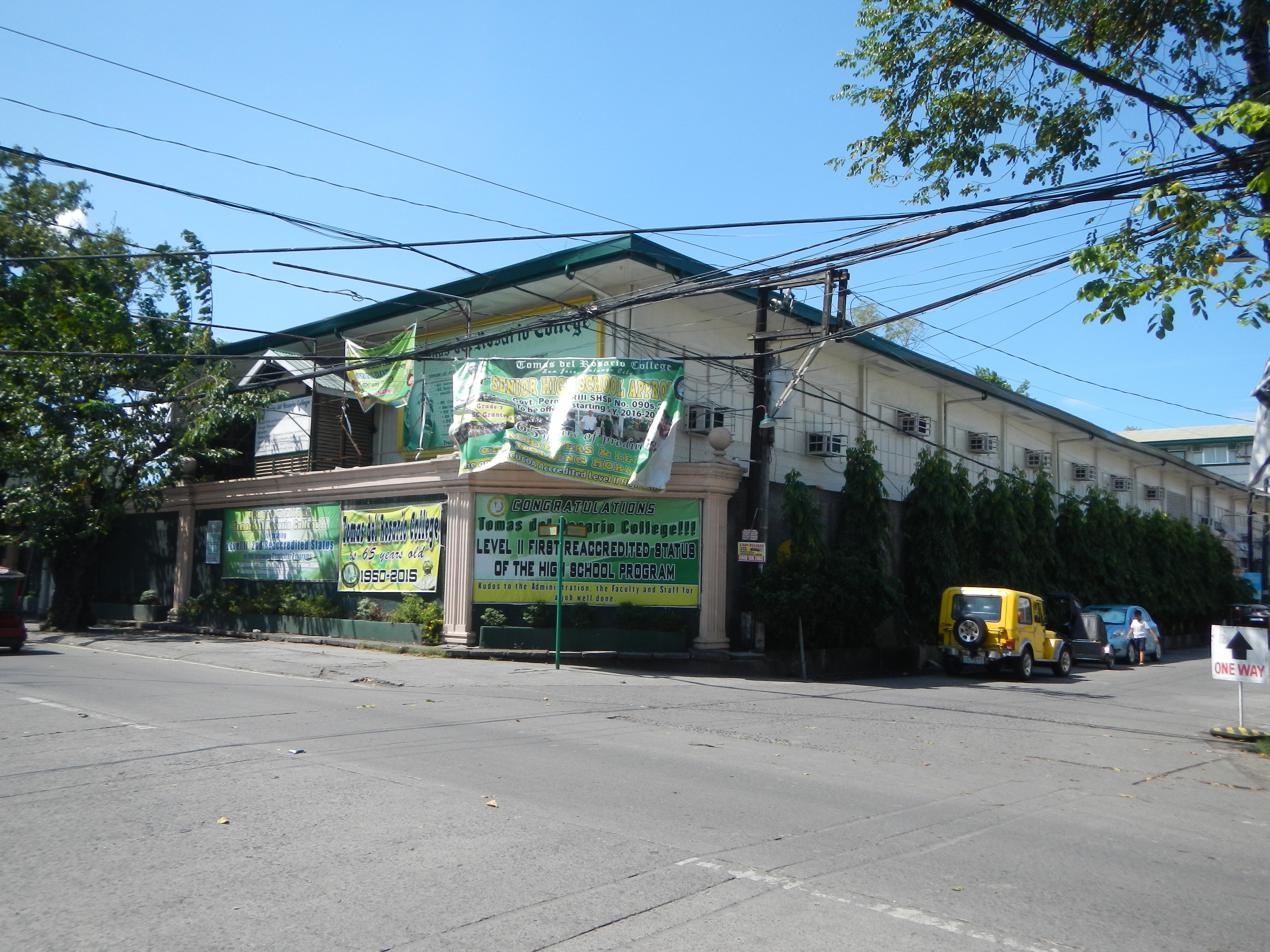
Facade in 2015

Tomas del Rosario College is a private college in Balanga, Bataan, Philippines. It was formerly known as Tomas del Rosario Academy. It became a college in 1994. Students from this school are called "del Rosarians".

Tomas del Rosario College is the only PACU-COA level II accredited private school in Bataan. It currently offers courses in the field of nursing, accounting, management, marketing, banking, education, and computer science.

== Location ==
The college is located along Capitol Drive in Barangay San Jose, Balanga, Bataan.

== Courses offered ==
Basic Education Department

- K to 12

College Department

- Bachelor of Science in Accountancy
- Bachelor of Science in Business Administration major in Marketing Management
- Bachelor of Science in Business Administration major in Operations Management
- Bachelor in Elementary Education major in General Education
- Bachelor in Elementary Education major in Pre-Elementary Education
- Bachelor of Science in Computer Science
- Bachelor of Science in Nursing
- Bachelor of Science in Hotel and Restaurant Management

Graduate School (Trimestral Calendar)

- Master of Arts in Education major in Educational Management

== Teaching methods ==
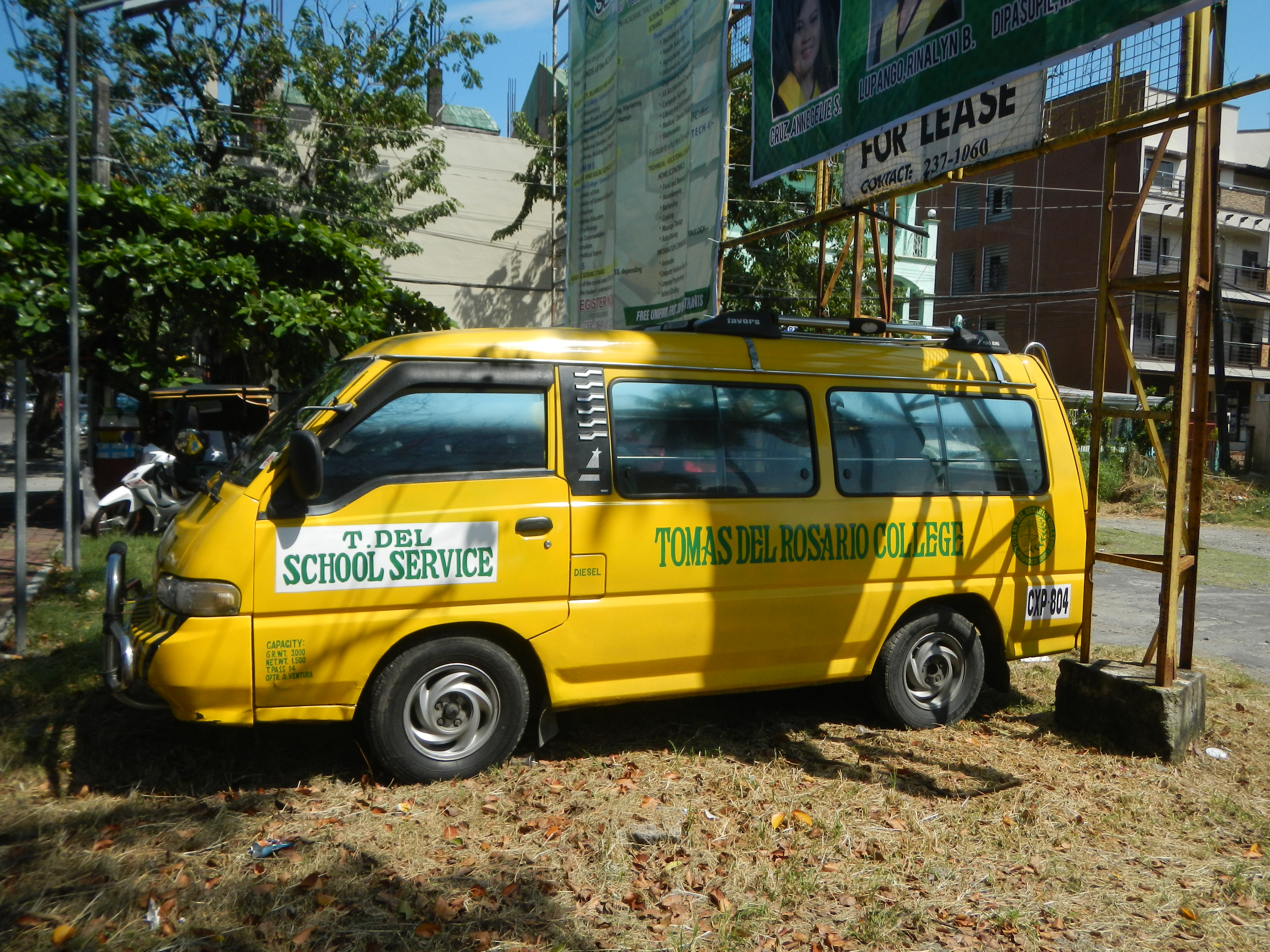
School bus

College Department:

Junior High School: Philippine Science Classes Curriculum oriented

- For Regular Students, EC (Enhanced Curriculum) is offered. An extra subject is Added per grade level.
- Grade 7 (Extra subject) - Environmental science
- Grade 8 (Extra subject) - Speech (Oral Communication)
- Grade 9 (Extra subject) - Journalism (Creative Writing)
- Grade 10 (Extra subject) - Calculus for High School

Senior High School: Academic track/s

- Science, technology, engineering, and mathematics
- Accountancy, Business, and Management
- Humanities and Social Sciences

Elementary and Pre-School: The Teaching Pedagogy implemented in this school for both levels starting S.Y. 2012-2013 comprises a reformed Montessorian method of education, with the principle that we uphold the holistic development and freedom of the student to explore his or her strengths.

== Notable alumni ==
- Joseph De Leon Yumul - Gold medalist in the Philippine National Skills competition — March 2012, Philippine representative in the 9th ASEAN Skills Competition
- Romi Garduce - Mountaineer, TV Personality/Host
- Teri Onor - Politician / TV Personality
- Darwin Saribay - accountant; 3rd Place in the CPA Board Examination (2011)

== Buildings, facilities and landmarks ==
- Don Tomas del Rosario Landmark
- KKK (Kamalig Kalinangang Kabataan)
- Munting Gubat
- Speech Laboratory
- Computer labs
1. BSN lab
