= Bataan Heroes Memorial College =

Private college in Bataan, Philippines

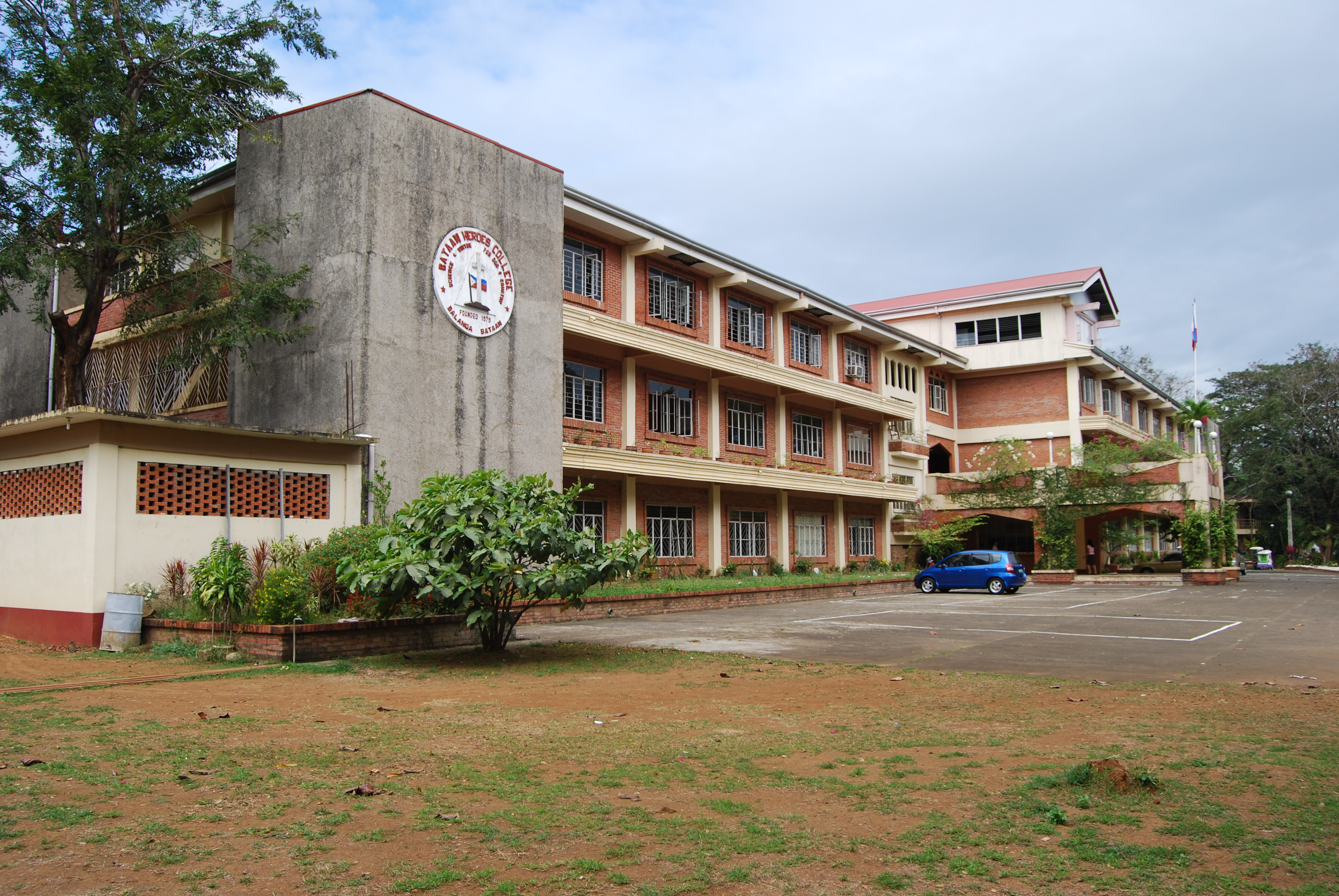
- Location: Balanga, Bataan, Philippines; 14°40′06″N 120°31′28″E
- Location in Luzon Location in the Philippines

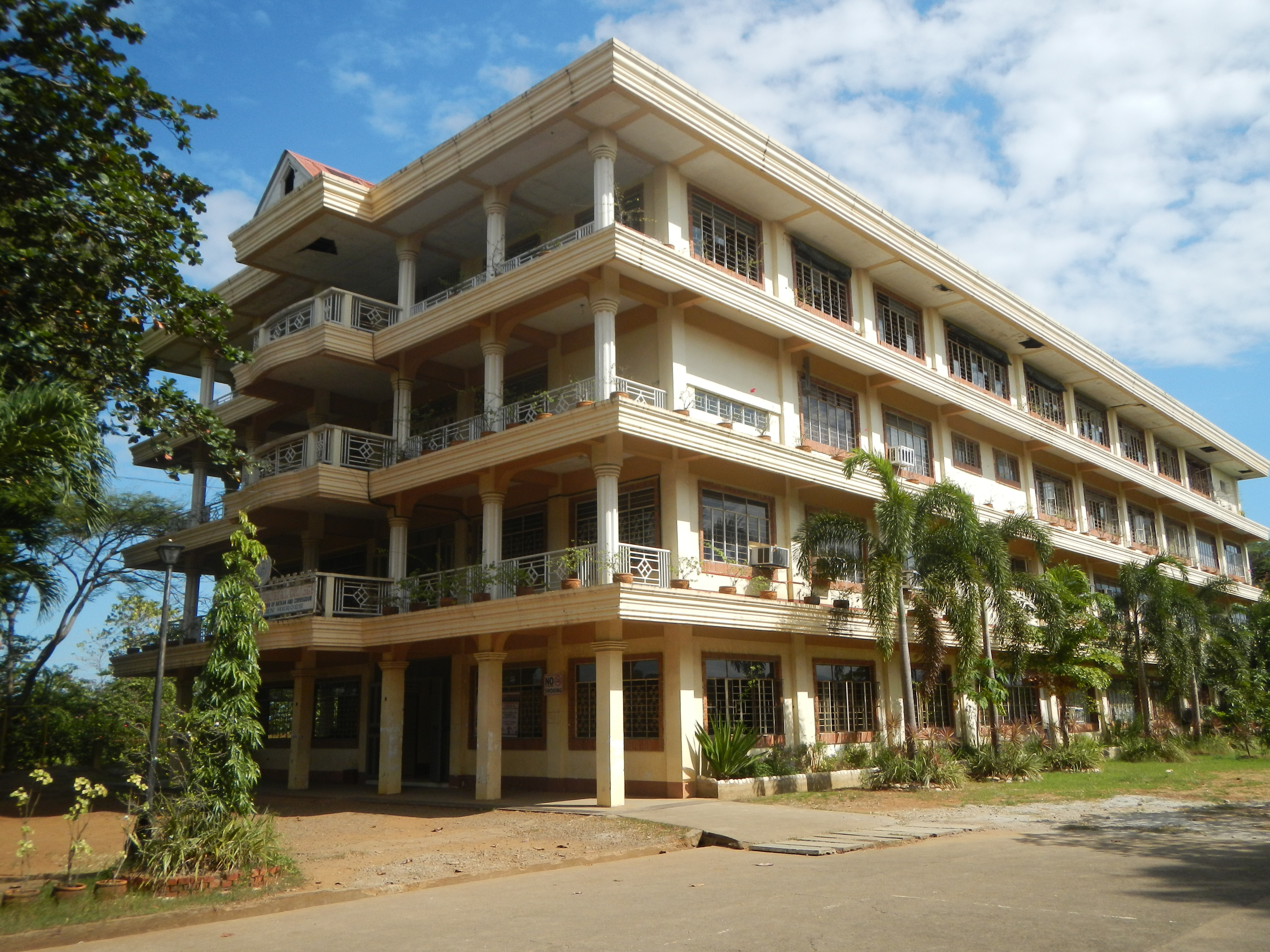
Interior facade, 2015

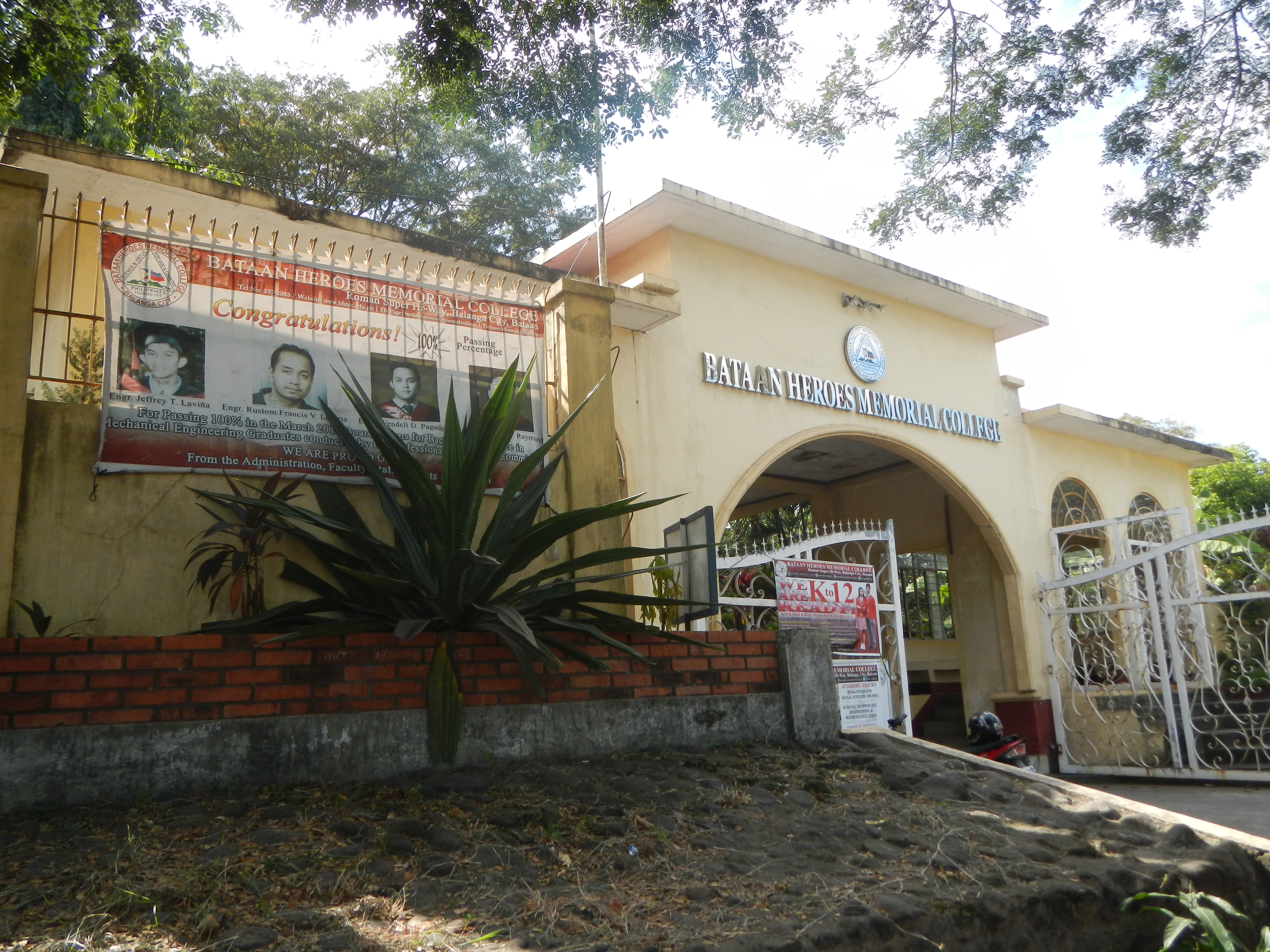
Main gate

Bataan Heroes Memorial College (BHMC) is a private non-sectarian, co-educational college, founded in June 1979 in Balanga, Bataan, Philippines. It is one of the four colleges and one university established by Engr. Sesenio Sanchez Rosales and Dr. Laureana San Pedro Rosales. The college was envisioned by its founders to serve as a monument to the defenders in the Battle of Bataan.

== History ==
The college started operations during school year 1979–1980 with 293 freshmen enrollees in general engineering, maritime education, commerce, liberal arts, secondary teacher education, secretarial, agriculture technology and secondary education courses. Before the school year ended, the ROTC department was activated as the 526th NROTC Unit of the Philippine Navy.

== Activities ==
The college currently offers courses in engineering, information technology, and criminology. A ladderized program in BS in information technology, BS in civil engineering and BS in mechanical engineering are also offered in the college in line with the country's development goals.

The college under the BHMC High School Department offers grade 7, 8 and 9 and in the next year, shall be offering a complete Junior High School program from grades 7–10.

Senior High School, grades 11 and 12 shall also be offered by BHMC beginning of June 2016 with the following tracks:

1. Academic Track

a. Science Technology Engineering and Mathematics (STEM) b. Humanities and Social Sciences (HUMMS) c. General Academic Strand (GAS)

2. Information and Communications Technology Track

a. Computer Software Servicing b. Computer Programming c. Animation and Visual Graphics Design

3. Industrial Arts Track

a. Welding b. Electrical Installation and Maintenance (EIM) c. Consumer Electronics Servicing (CES)
