= Day of Valor =

Public holiday in the Philippines

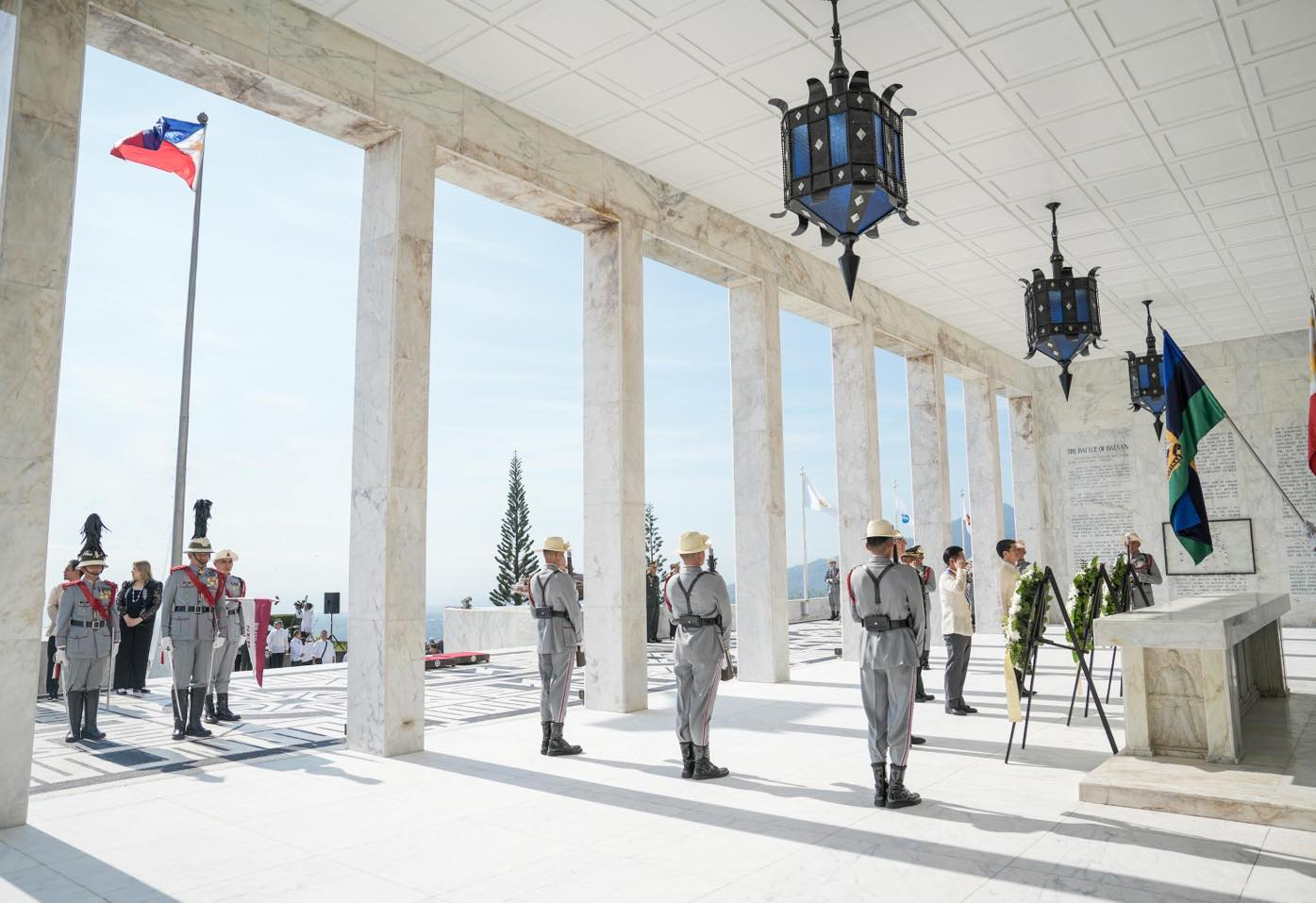
- President Bongbong Marcos offering a wreath at the Mount Samat National Shrine in Pilar, Bataan, during the Day of Valor in 2024
- Official name: Araw ng Kagitingan
- Also called: Bataan Day; Bataan and Corregidor Day
- Observed by: Philippines (nationwide), United States (Maywood, Illinois)
- Significance: Commemorates the fall of Bataan during World War II
- Date: April 9
- Next time: April 9, 2027
- Frequency: Annual
- First time: April 9, 1961 (as a Philippine holiday)

The Day of Valor, officially known in Filipino as Araw ng Kagitingan, is a national observance in the Philippines that commemorates the fall of Bataan and the Battle of Corregidor against Japanese troops during World War II. The day is officially celebrated every April 9, marking the start of the Bataan Death March, although the date has been moved on several occasions to avoid coinciding with the observance of Holy Week in the country, particularly the Easter Triduum and Easter Sunday, such as in 2004, 2009, 2020, and 2023.

Due to Bataan's significance in World War II, the holiday was officially known as Bataan Day or Bataan Day and Corregidor Day prior to the 2000s and is still referred to by these names by some. In the United States, the holiday is observed in Maywood, Illinois, where it continues to be known by its former name.

== Background ==
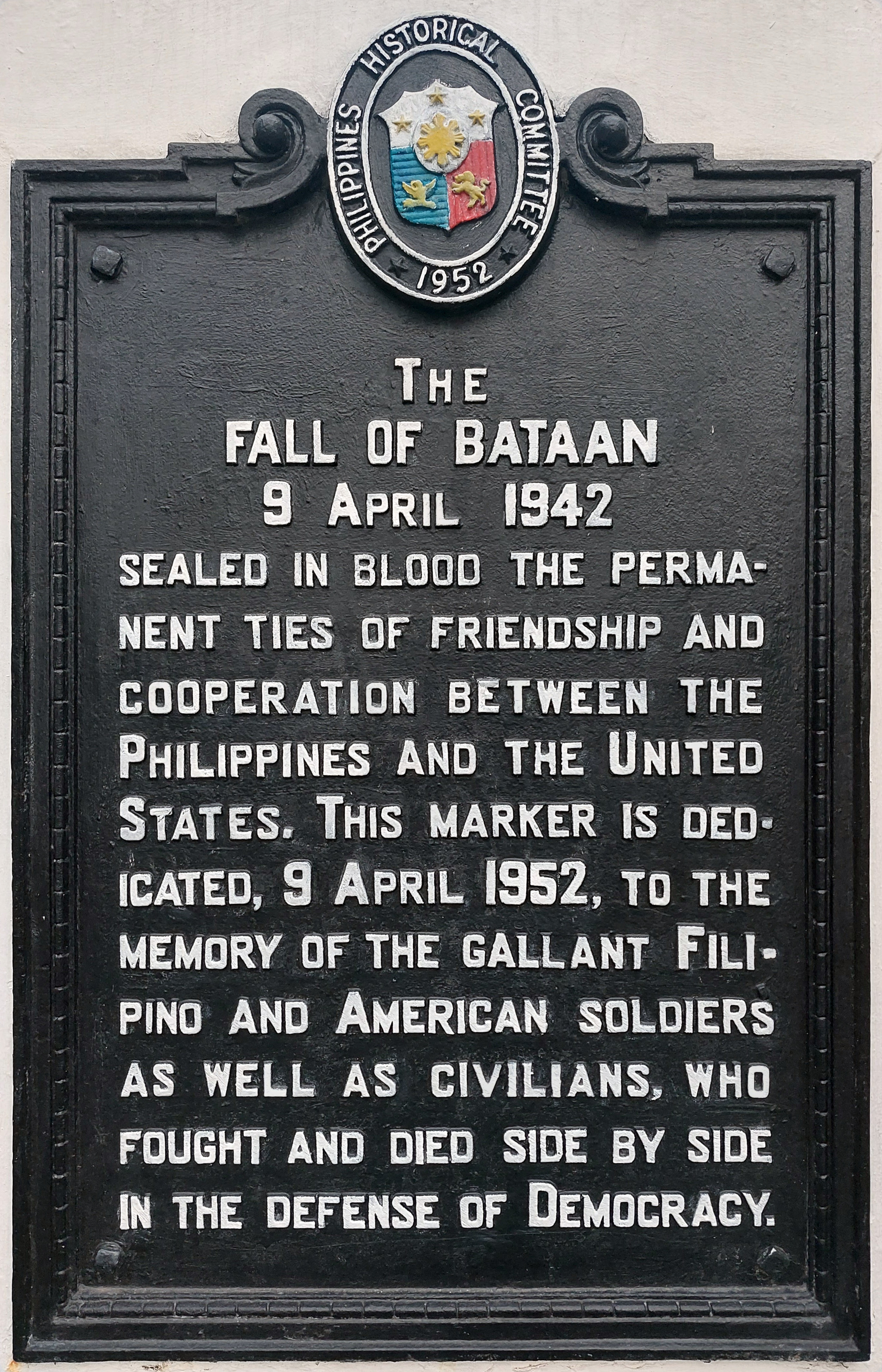
Fall of Bataan historical marker, Bataan Provincial Capitol grounds

At dawn on April 9, 1942, against the orders of Generals Douglas MacArthur and Jonathan Wainwright, the commander of the Luzon Force, Bataan, Major General Edward P. King, Jr., surrendered more than 76,000 starving and disease-ridden soldiers (64,000 Filipinos and 12,000 Americans) to Japanese troops.

The majority of these prisoners of war had their belongings confiscated before being forced to endure the infamous 140-kilometer (87 mi) Bataan Death March to Camp O'Donnell in Capas, Tarlac. En route, thousands died from dehydration, heat prostration, untreated wounds, and wanton execution while walking in deep dust over vehicle-broken Macadam roads, and crammed into rail cars for transport to captivity.

The few who were lucky enough to travel by truck to San Fernando, Pampanga would still have to endure more than 25 miles (40 km) of additional marching. Prisoners were beaten randomly and often denied promised food and water. Those who fell behind were usually executed or left to die, with the sides of the roads becoming littered with dead bodies and those moaning for help.

Only 54,000 of the 76,000 prisoners (66,000 Filipinos and 10,000 Americans) reached their destination; the exact death toll is difficult to assess because thousands of captives were able to escape from their guards. Approximately 3,000 prisoners may have died during the march, and 25–30,000 more while in captivity.

== History ==
=== Philippines ===
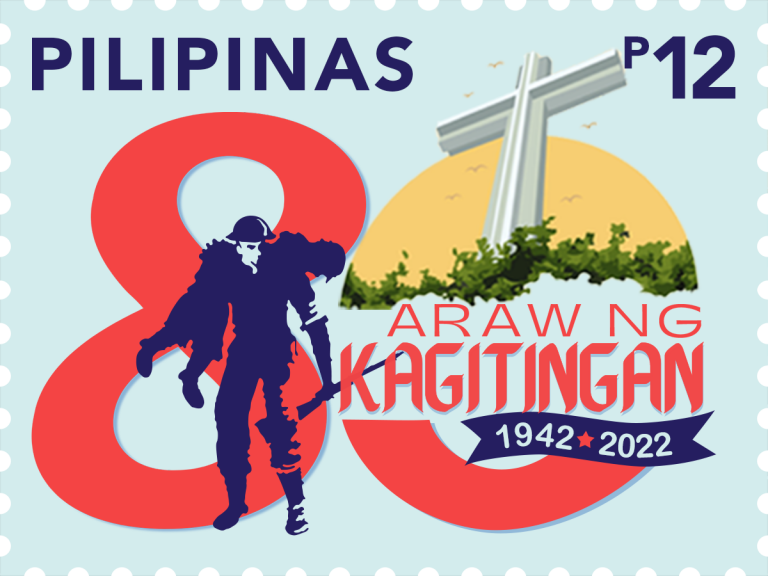
Araw ng Kagitingan 80th anniversary stamp

In April 1961, Philippine President Carlos P. Garcia signed Republic Act No. 3022 into law, declaring April 9 of every year as "Bataan Day".

On November 26, 1980, President Ferdinand Marcos issued Letter of Instruction No. 1087 providing revised guidelines for the observance of holidays. The holiday was shifted from April 9 to May 6 (the fall of Corregidor), to be known as "Araw ng Kagitingan (Bataan, Corregidor and Besang Pass Day)". This was first observed in 1981.

In June 1987, Executive Order No. 203, revising all national holidays, reverted the holiday to April 9 which was then referred to as "Araw ng Kagitingan (Bataan and Corregidor Day)". Less than a month later, another executive order (No. 292) revised the holidays anew, again referring to the April 9 holiday with the same name.

In 2007, Congress passed Republic Act No. 9492, putting into law the "Holiday Economics" policy of President Gloria Macapagal Arroyo; this put the observance of each holiday, with the exception of New Year's Day and Christmas, to the Monday nearest it. The order referred to the holiday celebrated on the Monday nearest April 9 as "Araw ng Kagitingan (Bataan and Corregidor Day)". Starting in 2008, the holiday was called simply as "Araw ng Kagitingan", and was celebrated on the nearest Monday. This practice was repeated in 2009. In 2010, the holiday was still named as such, but was celebrated on April 9.

Starting with the administration of President Benigno Aquino III, celebrations of the holiday have been observed on April 9, instead of being moved to the nearest Monday, and the holiday has been called simply "Araw ng Kagitingan" since 2011.

In 2023, April 10 was declared a special non-working holiday instead of April 9, which coincided with Easter Sunday, by virtue of Proclamation No. 90. The holiday was included in the "holiday economics", adjusting the observance of the holiday to the nearest Monday for a longer weekend.

=== United States ===
The United States Congress passed a joint resolution on April 8, 1954, declaring the next day, April 9, 1954, the 12th anniversary of the fall of Bataan, as "Bataan Day". The joint resolution also mentioned that Philippine President Ramon Magsaysay had earlier declared it to be such.

On April 8, 1987, U.S. President Ronald Reagan, by virtue of Senate Joint Resolution 47 declared April 9, 1987, as "National Former POW Recognition Day". President Joe Biden continued the tradition, declaring April 9, 2021, as such.

== Observance ==
=== Philippines ===
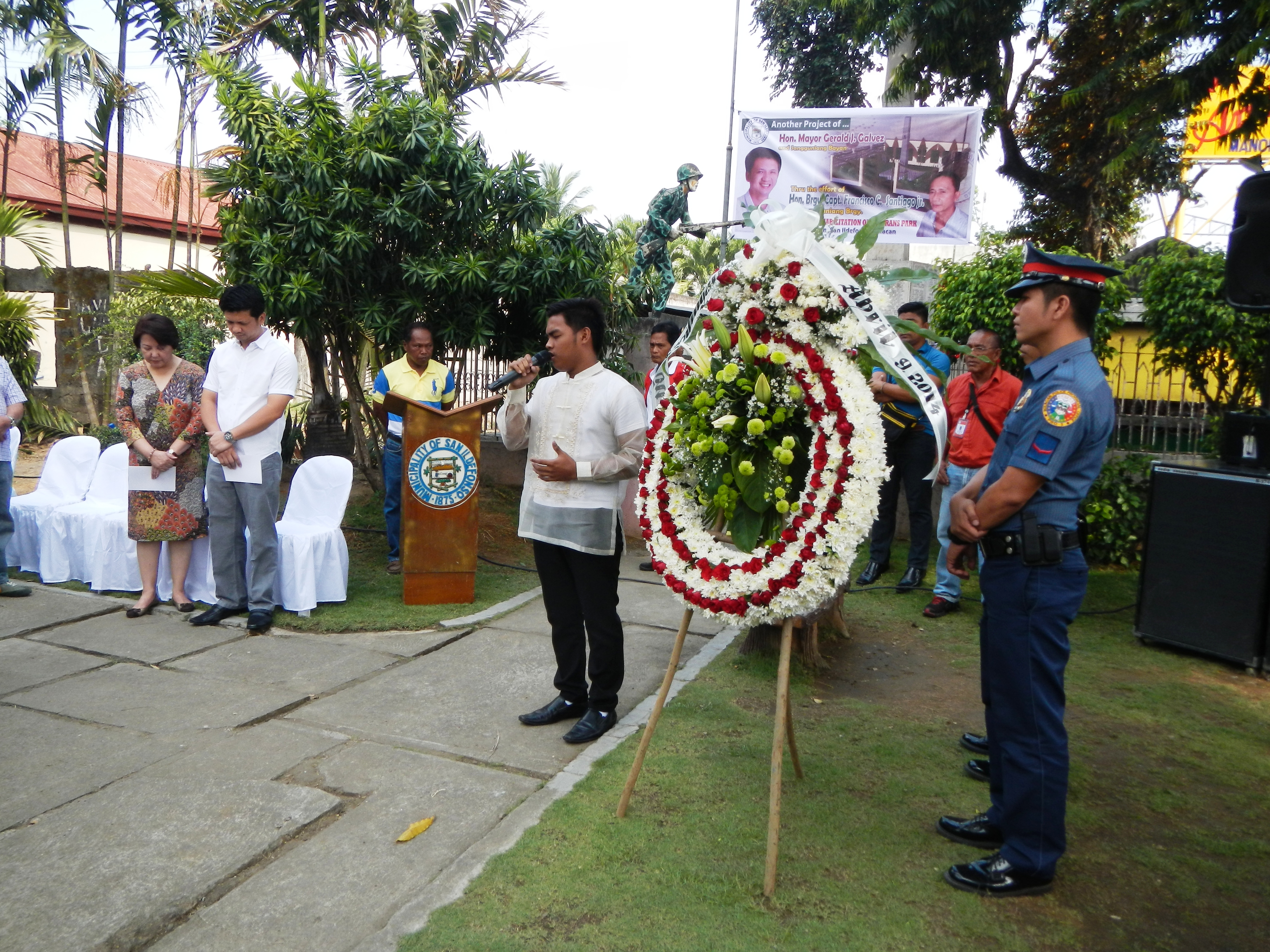
2014 Day of Valor commemoration at Veterans Park, San Ildefonso, Bulacan

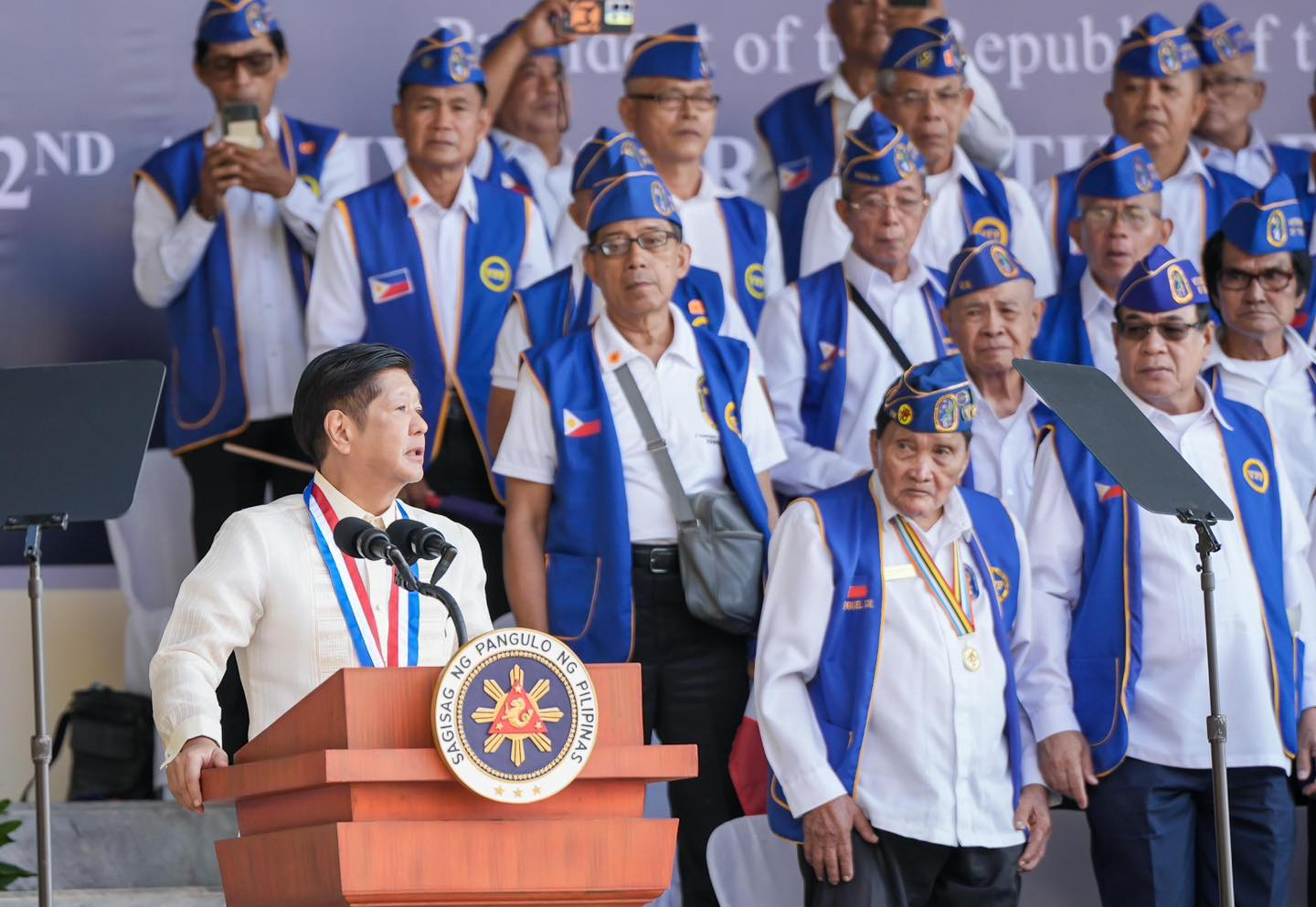
President Bongbong Marcos delivering a speech at Mount Samat National Shrine on 2024 Day of Valor, with veterans on the background

The observance usually is centered on Mount Samat National Shrine in Pilar, Bataan. It is usually attended by the President of the Philippines, the Governor of Bataan, the ambassadors of the United States and Japan, and surviving veterans groups.

The holiday is covered within and serves as the central focus of the Philippine Veterans Week, by virtue of Proclamation No. 466 signed by President Corazon Aquino in 1987. The week-long commemoration honors Filipino war veterans who fought during World War II and those who rendered honorable military service in times of war and peace.

By 2021, there were only 2,952 defenders of Bataan who are still alive.

==== 1994 ====
In 1994, due to the unresolved 1993 Bataan gubernatorial recall election, the observance excluded the Bataan governor Tet Garcia from participating in the event, with local officials who are supporters of his opponent, Ding Roman, in the recall election, staying at the foot of Mount Samat. President Fidel V. Ramos acknowledged "provincial officials of Bataan", and Teddy Pizarro, the mayor of Pilar, the host town.

==== 2012 ====
In 2012, the 70th anniversary of the Fall of Bataan was commemorated at Mount Samat Shrine in Pilar, Bataan by some of the over 18,000 still-living Filipino veterans.

Then-incumbent President Benigno S. Aquino III and former President Fidel V. Ramos attended the rites. Japanese ambassador to the Philippines Toshina Urabe expressed "deep apology and a deep sense of remorse to the tragedy", while the United States Deputy Chief of Mission Leslie A. Bassett (representing U.S. ambassador Harry K. Thomas Jr.) said that their embassy has provided a total of US$220 million (over ₱9 billion) to Filipino war veterans.

==== 2022 ====
In 2022, the 80th anniversary, President Rodrigo Duterte was represented by Menardo Guevarra, the Secretary of Justice, and was attended by Japanese ambassador Koshikawa Kazuhiko and United States chargé d’Affaires ad interim Heather Variava.

==== 2026 ====
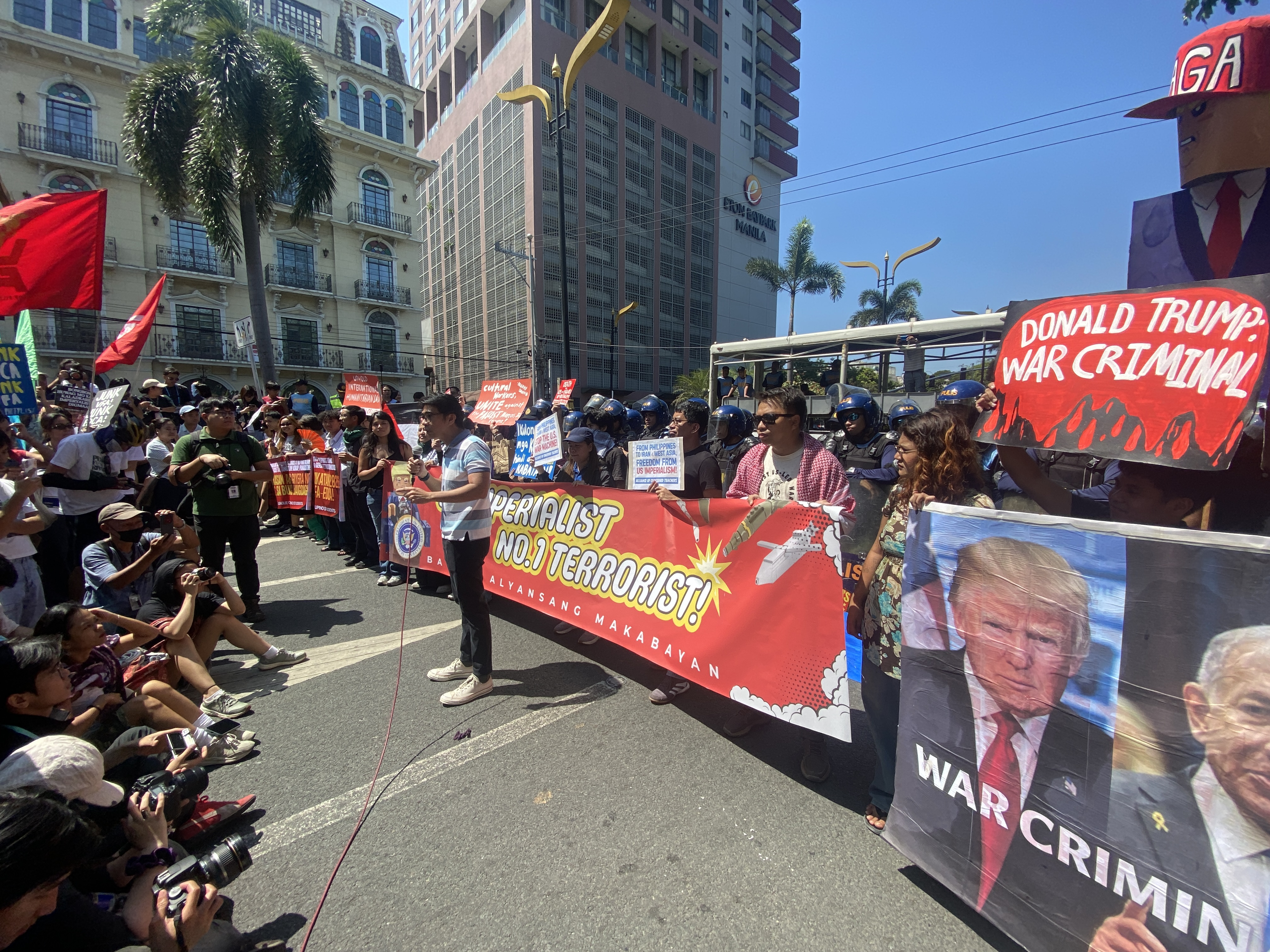
Protest in Manila during 2026 Day of Valor

In 2026, President Bongbong Marcos led recognition rites in Mount Samat. Several social media pages supporting Vice President Sara Duterte alleged that such appearances were manipulated content, and that Marcos himself was gravely ill. Later that week, Marcos made an unexpected public appearance at the Malacañang Palace press area, which Marcos said that such rumors of him being ill were "falsehoods".

On the same day, Bagong Alyansang Makabayan (Bayan) and other progressive groups held a protest in Manila, marching along Kalaw Avenue toward the United States Embassy. The demonstrators denounced recent military actions by the United States and Israel in the ongoing Iran conflict, while demanding the withdrawal of all foreign troops from the Philippines, framing these issues as interconnected struggles for sovereignty and accountability.

=== United States ===
In Maywood, Illinois, the second Sunday in September is remembered as Bataan Day. Maywood provided Illinois National Guard soldiers of the 192nd Tank Battalion who served on Bataan.

In Honolulu, Hawaii there is an annual commemoration at the National Memorial Cemetery of the Pacific every April 9.
