= 2025 Bataan local elections =

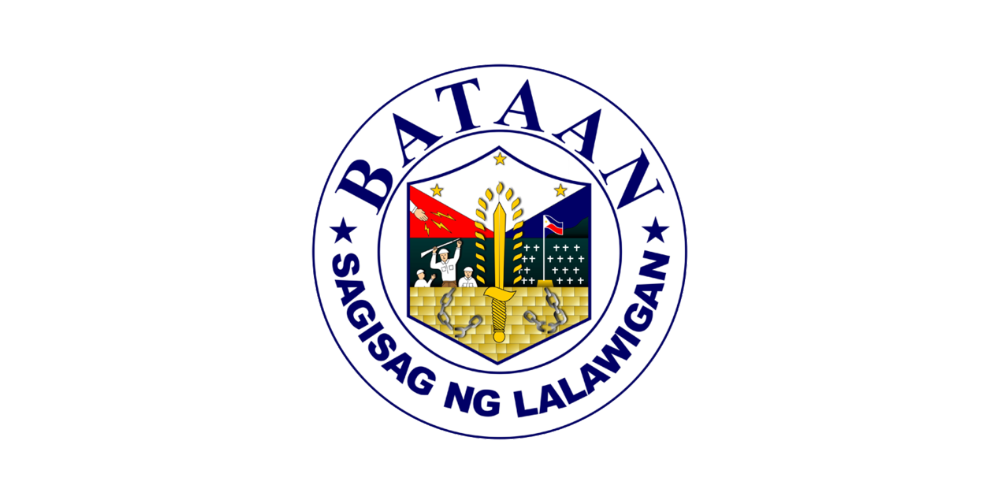
- May 12, 2025
- Gubernatorial election
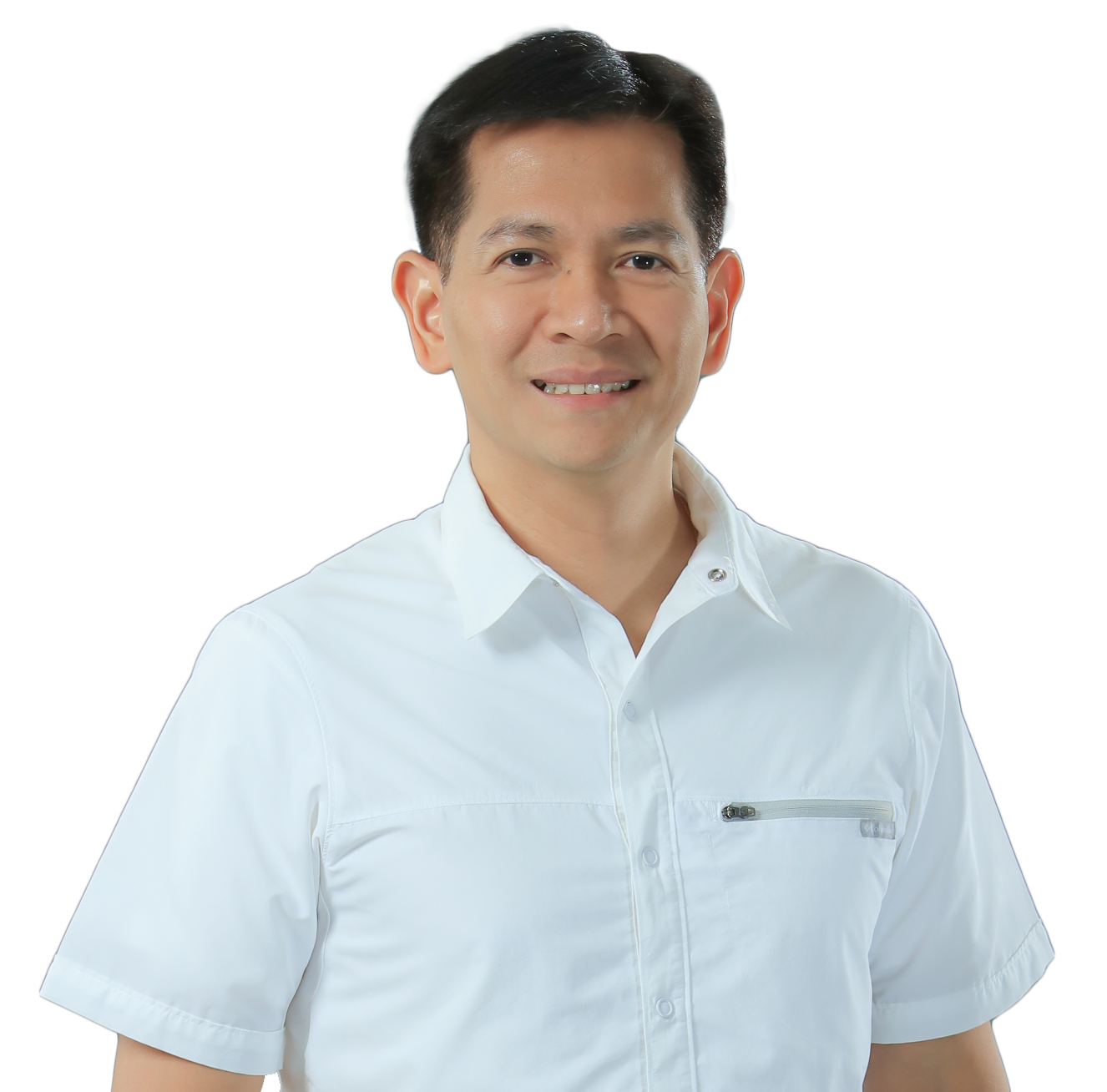
		IND
Candidate	Joet Garcia	Estrella Santos
Party	PFP	Independent
Running mate	Cris Garcia	None
Popular vote	388,011	49,428
Percentage	88.7%	11.3%
Governor before election
Joet Garcia
PFP
Elected Governor
Joet Garcia
PFP
- Vice gubernatorial election
	PFP	IND
Candidate	Cris Garcia	JV Coronel
Party	PFP	Independent
Popular vote	350,668	50,870
Percentage	87.33%	12.67%
Vice Governor before election
Cris Garcia
PFP
Elected Vice Governor
Cris Garcia
PFP
- Provincial Board election

10 out of 14 seats in the Bataan Provincial Board 8 seats needed for a majority
	First party	Second party	Third party
Party	PFP	National Unity Party	Nacionalista
Last election	Did not participate	25.21%, 3 seats	24.59%, 3 seats
Seats before	3	3	3
Seats won	5	3	2
Seat change	▲2	Steady	▼1
Popular vote	461,097	312,638	156,842
Percentage	47.41%	32.14%	16.13%
	Fourth party
Party	KANP
Last election	Did not participate
Seats before	0
Seats won	0
Seat change	Steady
Popular vote	42,040
Percentage	4.32%

Local elections were held in the province of Bataan on May 12, 2025, as part of the 2025 Philippine general elections. Registered voters will elect a governor, vice governor, 10 members of Sangguinang Panglalawigan members, representative, mayor, vice mayor and municipal/city councilors. The election saw all incumbent candidates backed by the Partido Federal ng Pilipinas retain their seats, and was characterized as a "sweeping victory" for the Garcia political family, led by governor Joet Garcia.

== Governor ==
Incumbent governor Joet Garcia (Partido Federal ng Pilipinas) ran for a second term in 2025. Garcia was elected to his first term under the PDP–Laban ticket in 2022, when he ran unopposed. Garcia's opponent Estrella Santos, the former mayor of Pilar, ran as an independent politician.

=== Candidates ===
The following candidates were included on the ballot:

No.	Candidate	Party
1	Joet Garcia (incumbent)	Partido Federal ng Pilipinas
2	Estrella Santos	Independent

Bataan gubernatorial election
Party	Candidate	Votes	%
PFP	Joet Garcia	388,011	88.70
Independent	Estrella Santos	49,428	11.30
Total votes		437,439	100.00
PFP hold			

== Vice governor ==
Incumbent Cris Garcia (Partido Federal ng Pilipinas), Joet Garcia's older brother, ran for a third term in 2025. Garcia had been re-elected as vice governor with 87.19% of the vote in 2022 running under the National Unity Party. Garcia's opponent JV Coronel ran as an independent.

=== Candidates ===
The following candidates were included on the ballot:

No.	Candidate	Party
1	JV Coronel	Independent
2	Cris Garcia (incumbent)	Partido Federal ng Pilipinas

=== Results ===
Bataan vice gubernatorial election
Party	Candidate	Votes	%
PFP	Cris Garcia	350,668	87.33
Independent	JV Coronel	50,870	12.67
Total votes		401,538	100.00
PFP hold			

== Provincial Board ==
The Bataan Provincial Board is composed of 14 board members, 10 of whom were up for re-election in the 2025 cycle.

=== Retiring and term-limited board members ===
Antonino Roman III (Lakas–CMD, 1st provincial district), who decided to run for the House of Representatives in Bataan's 1st legislative district, announced his retirement from the board prior to the 2025 elections.

Two board members were term-limited and unable to run for re-election in 2025: Manny Beltran (Nacionalista Party) of the 2nd provincial district and Benjie Serrano (Nacionalista Party) of the 1st provincial district.

=== Overview ===
Party	Votes	%	Seats
Partido Federal ng Pilipinas	461,097	47.41	5
National Unity Party	312,638	32.14	3
Nacionalista Party	156,842	16.13	2
Katipunan ng Nagkakaisang Pilipino	42,040	4.32	0
Ex officio seats			3
Reserved seats			1
Total	972,617	100.00	14

=== 1st provincial district ===
Bataan's 1st provincial district consists of the same area as Bataan's 1st legislative district. A total of three board members were elected from this district.

==== Candidates ====
The following candidates were included in the ballot:

No.	Candidate	Party
1	Maya Bongco	Katipunan ng Nagkakaisang Pilipino
2	Bong Galicia	Partido Federal ng Pilipinas
3	Jomar Gaza (incumbent)	Partido Federal ng Pilipinas
4	Mylene Serrano	Nacionalista Party

==== Results ====
Bataan's 1st provincial board district election
Party	Candidate	Votes	%
PFP	Jomar Gaza	77,731	30.22
Nacionalista	Mylene Serrano	71,378	27.75
PFP	Bong Galicia	66,106	25.70
KANP	Maya Bongco	42,040	16.34
Total votes		257,255	100.00

=== 2nd provincial district ===
Bataan's 2nd provincial district consists of the same area as Bataan's 2nd legislative district. A total of three board members were elected from this provincial district.

==== Candidates ====
The following candidates were included in the ballot:

No.	Candidate	Party
1	Vic Baluyot	Partido Federal ng Pilipinas
2	Iya Roque (incumbent)	National Unity Party
3	Noel Valdecañas (incumbent)	Partido Federal ng Pilipinas

==== Results ====
Bataan's 2nd provincial board district election
Party	Candidate	Votes	%
NUP	Iya Roque	116,405	36.47
PFP	Noel Valdecañas	101,538	31.81
PFP	Vic Baluyot	101,279	31.73
Total votes		319,222	100.00

=== 3rd provincial district ===
Bataan's 3rd provincial district consists of the same area as Bataan's 3rd legislative district. Four board members were elected from this provincial district.

==== Candidates ====
The following candidates were included in the ballot:

No.	Candidate	Party
1	Popoy del Rosario (incumbent)	Partido Federal ng Pilipinas
2	Harold Espeleta (incumbent)	National Unity Party
3	Jorge Estanislao (incumbent)	National Unity Party
4	Angel Sunga (incumbent)	Nacionalista Party

==== Results ====
Bataan's 3rd provincial board district election
Party	Candidate	Votes	%
PFP	Popoy del Rosario	109,171	27.93
Nacionalista	Angel Sunga	99,286	25.40
NUP	Jorge Estanislao	96,947	24.80
NUP	Harold Espeleta	85,464	21.87
Total votes		390,868	100.00

== Congressional Elections ==
=== 1st District ===
- Municipalities: Abucay, Hermosa, Orani and Samal.

Content creator and lawyer Antonino B. Roman III, the husband of incumbent Geraldine Roman, will run for the position unopposed.

Bataan's 1st congressional district election
Party	Candidate	Votes	%
Lakas	Tony Roman	114,677	100.00
Total votes		114,677	100.00
Lakas hold			

=== 2nd District ===
- Municipalities: Balanga, Limay, Orion and Pilar

Incumbent Albert Garcia, who is seeking for his fifth term in office, is running unopposed.

Bataan's 2nd congressional district election
Party	Candidate	Votes	%
NUP	Abet Garcia	149,614	100.00
Total votes		149,614	100.00
NUP hold			

=== 3rd District ===
- Municipalities: Bagac, Dinalupihan, Mariveles, Morong

Incumbent Maria Angela Garcia is seeking for her second term in office. She will be challenged by independent candidate Ernesto Manalo.

Bataan's 3rd congressional district election
Party	Candidate	Votes	%
NUP	Gila Garcia	144,517	87.51
Independent	Ernesto Manalo	20,627	12.49
Total votes		165,144	100.00
NUP hold			
