= José Juan Serapio =

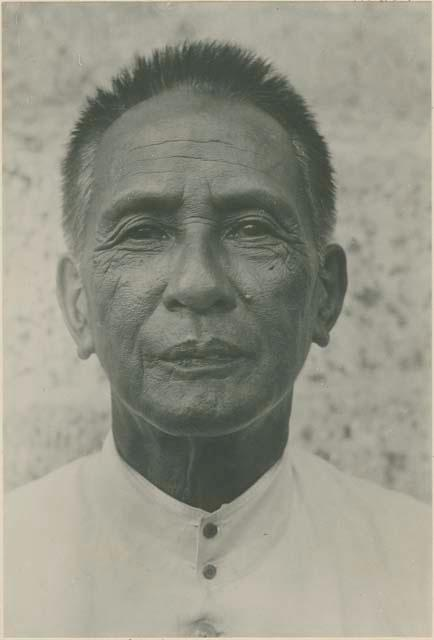

3rd Governor of Bulacan
- In office 1900–1901
- Preceded by: Isidoro Torres
- Succeeded by: Pablo Ocampo Tecson

Capitan Municipal of Santa Maria

Personal details
- Born: José Juan Serapio; 1834 Bagbaguin, Santa Maria, Bulacan, Captaincy General of the Philippines
- Died: October 1, 1924 (aged 89–90)
- Occupation: Military officer, politician, landowner

José Juan Serapio (1834 – October 1, 1924) was a Filipino military officer, politician, and landowner who served as the 3rd Governor of the province of Bulacan from 1900 to 1901 during the Philippine-American War. A native of Santa Maria, Bulacan, he is recognized as a key historical figure in his hometown for his political leadership and philanthropic contributions to the local education system.

== Early life and military career ==
Born in the barrio of Bagbaguin in Santa Maria, Bulacan, Serapio belonged to a prominent local family. Prior to his involvement in the Philippine Revolution, he served as the Capitan Municipal (Municipal Captain) of Santa Maria during the latter part of the Spanish colonial period. Local historical records from the provincial government describe him as a "towering disciplinarian" and an "imposing leader."

When the Philippine Revolution broke out against the Spanish colonial government, and subsequently during the Philippine-American War, Serapio served as a high-ranking officer in the revolutionary army. He held the rank of Captain, and later Colonel, leading local Filipino forces. According to the National Historical Commission of the Philippines (NHCP), his leadership was influential enough that local Filipino clergymen, such as Rev. P. Victorino Lopez, the first Filipino parish priest of the Quingua Church (now Plaridel), joined the revolutionary movement and served as leaders directly under Serapio's command.

== Governorship ==
As the First Philippine Republic sought to establish provincial governments amidst the ongoing conflict with American forces, Serapio was appointed as the third Revolutionary Governor of Bulacan. He succeeded Brigadier General Isidoro Torres and served from 1900 until 1901. His tenure was marked by the difficult transition from the revolutionary government to the incoming American civil administration. Following his term, he was succeeded by Pablo Tecson, who became the first Bulacan governor to serve under the established American colonial rule.

== Legacy ==
Serapio is best remembered today for his contributions to the public education infrastructure of Santa Maria, Bulacan. In the mid-20th century, as the local population rapidly expanded, the residents of Barrio Catmon required a larger public school facility. Serapio, acting as a major local landowner, donated a one-hectare parcel of land to the government for the construction of a new semi-permanent, three-room school building.

The school, which originally began formal education in 1946 under the name Catmon Elementary School, was subsequently renamed Jose Juan Serapio Elementary School in his honor. Today, it remains a central educational institution in the municipality, commemorating his dual legacy as a revolutionary governor and a benefactor of local education.
