= Pablo Tecson =

Philippine governor (1859–1940)

The Honorable Pablo Tecson
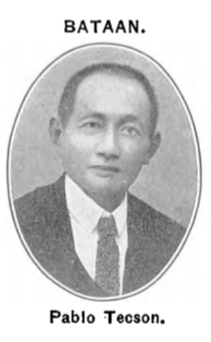
- Tecson as member of the Philippine Assembly, c. 1913

Member of the Philippine Assembly from Bataan's at-large district
- In office 1912–1915
- Preceded by: Tomás del Rosario
- Succeeded by: Maximino de los Reyes

4th Governor of Bulacan
- In office 1902–1906
- Preceded by: José Juan Serapio
- Succeeded by: Teodoro Sandiko

Member of the Malolos Congress from Cagayan
- In office September 15, 1898 – November 13, 1899 Serving with Vicente Guzman Pagulayan and Anastacio Francisco

Personal details
- Born: Pablo Tecson y Ocampo; July 4, 1859 San Miguel de Mayumo, Bulacan, Captaincy General of the Philippines
- Died: April 30, 1940 (aged 80) San Miguel, Bulacan, Philippine Commonwealth
- Party: Nacionalista
- Spouse(s): Juana Mendoza; Tomasa V. Bulos-Tecson
- Relations: Felisa C. Tantoco
- Children: Vicente M. Tecson; Jose Tecson Tantoco (1904–); Lorenzo B. Tecson; Josefina B. Tecson-Buencamino; Isabel B. Tecson; Benjamin B. Tecson; Paulita B. Tecson-Arias; Zenaida B. Tecson-David
- Education: San Juan de Letran
- Occupation: Brigadaire General (Philippine Revolution); Governor General, Bulacan; Secretary of the Department of Agriculture (U.S. Protectorate); Agriculturist

Pablo Ocampo Tecson (born Pablo Tecson y Ocampo; July 4, 1859 – April 30, 1940) was an officer in the Revolutionary Army serving under Gen. Gregorio del Pilar (responsible for the eventual surrender of the Spanish forces) and a representative to the Malolos Congress. He was elected the Governor General of Bulacan immediately following the Philippine–American War. Tecson later served as Insular Secretary of the Philippine Bureau of Agriculture.

== Early life and education ==
Pablo Tecson was born July 4, 1859, in San Miguel de Mayumo, Bulacan, Philippines; the son of Tiburcio Tecson and Paula Ocampo. He studied in San Miguel and later, at the Colegio de San Juan de Letran in Intramuros, Manila, where he finished his Bachelor of Arts program.

== Early career ==
Tecson worked as a writer for a Spanish-era magazine, the Catholic Periodical Guide (Pahayagan Patnubay ng Catolico), in Malolos, the county seat of Bulacan; its initial publication being in April 1890.

== Military action against Spain ==
When the revolution against Spain broke out, Tecson was an officer in the Spanish Civil Guards (Guardia Civil) in San Miguel.

=== Background ===
In 1896, Tecson co-founded the Arao (Balangay Arao) branch of a secret society-turned-revolutionary government, the Katipunan (Kataastaasang Kagalanggalangang Katipunan, or KKK)(Filipino: nang mga anak nang bayan), which operated out of San Miguel.

On December 14, 1897, the Pact of Biak-na-Bato, was signed in Tecson's residence. It called for a truce between Spanish Colonial Governor-General Fernando Primo de Rivera, and insurgent leader, Emilio Aguinaldo, to end the Philippine Revolution. Aguinaldo and his fellow revolutionaries were given amnesty and money and agreed to go into voluntary exile in Hong Kong. (Aguinaldo later used the money to purchase firearms.) Following Aguinaldo's return from exile in Hong Kong, Tecson defected from the Civil Guards and joined Aguinaldo's Republican Army as a captain.

Following the Cry of Nueva Ecija, he fought alongside General Manuel Tinio (especially in Nueva Ecija) and General Francisco Macabulos. He himself was eventually ranked brigadier general under del Pilar.

=== Battle of San Miguel ===
On May 24, 1898, Tecson launched attacks on the Spanish Civil Guard garrisons in San Miguel and San Rafael, Bulacan (collectively known as the Battle of San Miguel); which ended with the Spanish force's surrender on June 1, 1898.

== Wartime politics ==
In 1898, Tecson represented the province of Cagayan at the Malolos Congress (which drafted the Charter of the First Philippine Republic) a few months before the outbreak of the war with America. He cast the deciding vote which addressed the constitutional provision of the separation of church and state.

== Military action against the United States ==
=== Battle of Quingua ===
The Battle of Quingua was fought on April 23, 1899, in Quingua, Bulacan (now Plaridel), which resulted in a rout of the Filipinos by their former allies, the United States.

== Career and politics following the war ==
Tecson was elected governor general of Bulacan—the first accepted under American rule, serving from 1902–1906. In 1904, he was named as a delegate of the Philippine's Worlds Fair Commission. Tecson resigned from government service in 1906 and went into farming. He was one of the first to promote the silk culture industry in the Philippines. He returned to government service in 1907, becoming the Secretary of the Department of Agriculture.

== Philanthropy, legacy and death ==
Tecson died on April 30, 1940 and is buried in San Miguel. Before his death, he donated land for a public burial ground for Filipino patriots. A Philippine Army camp is named after him and is currently the headquarters of the First Scout Ranger Regiment, a unit that specializes in anti-guerilla warfare, direct action, reconnaissance, and other forms of special operations.
