= 1993 Bataan gubernatorial recall election =

- December 20, 1993

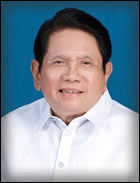
| Nominee | Ding Roman | Tet Garcia |
| Party | Lakas | NPC |
| Popular vote | 77,892 | 73,958 |
| Percentage | 51.30 | 48.70 |
Governor before election
Tet Garcia
NPC
Elected Governor
Ding Roman
Lakas

The 1993 Bataan gubernatorial recall election was held on December 20, 1993 in the province of Bataan, Philippines. Former governor Ding Roman defeated incumbent Tet Garcia in the recall election to become governor of Bataan.

== Electoral system ==
Recall elections are allowed by Republic Act No. 7160 or the 1991 Local Government Code of the Philippines. A recall can be initiated by a petition of at least 25% of the registered voters in the local government unit (LGU) concerned. A resolution from a preparatory recall assembly composed of all of the elected local officials in the LGU concerned is another method of initiating a recall election. An official could be subjected to a recall only once during one's term of office, and from one year after the official took office, up to one year before the next regularly scheduled election.

Provincial governors are elected via first-past-the-post voting.

== Background ==
Then congressman Tet Garcia defeated governor Ding Roman in the 1992 gubernatorial election. On July 7, 1993, a preparatory recall assembly (PRA) voted to recall Garcia, with 74 affirmative votes out of possible 144 votes, or just two votes more than a majority, citing "loss of confidence." The PRA included mostly of people who opposed Garcia, citing as Garcia proponents won't vote to recall anyway, so they were not invited. The Commission on Elections (COMELEC) scheduled the recall election on October 11, 1993. The COMELEC earmarked at least 7 million pesos for the election, where a total of 266,542 voters were registered for the 1992 election, with Garcia, running under the Nationalist People's Coalition (NPC) getting 95,536 votes, about 15,000 votes more than Roman, who ran under the Laban ng Demokratikong Pilipino (LDP). Among the 74 who recalled Garcia, most were either from the LDP or the Liberal Party of congressman Felicito Payumo, while only 7 were from the NPC.

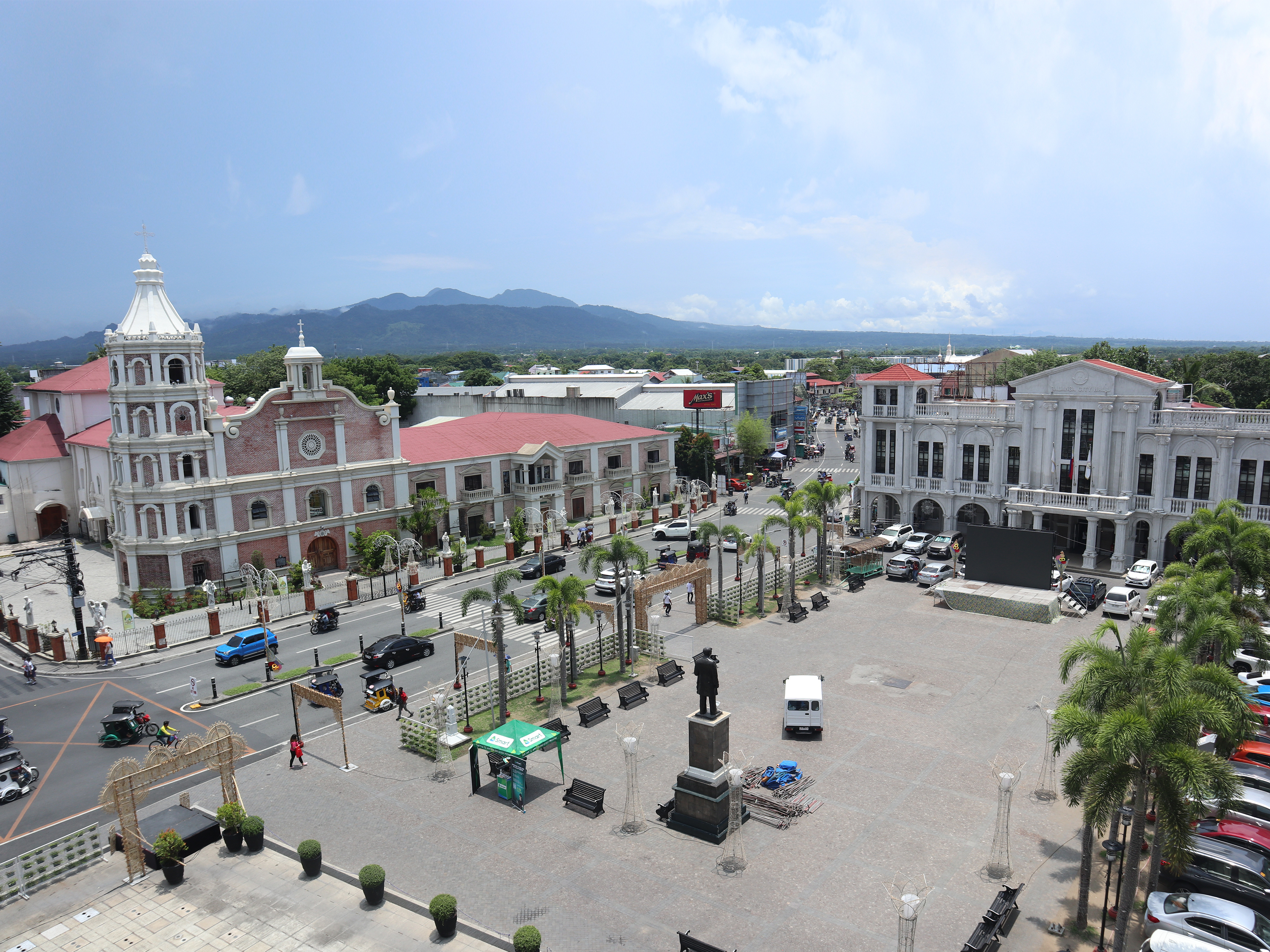
Balanga city plaza as it appeared in 2023

Garcia sued for relief in the Supreme Court, which granted his petition on September 21 for lack of due process. Two days later, Mariveles mayor Oscar de los Reyes moved to recall Garcia again. The PRA reconvened in the Balanga town plaza, was attended by pro-Garcia politicians, who walked out of the proceedings. The assembly voted to recall Garcia once again, this time with 87 votes in favor, well above the 72 required.

By November, the COMELEC asked the government 6.4 million pesos for the conduct of the recall election, and it was expecting one or two candidates to challenge Garcia. A week later, it ordered all of the candidates to a meeting. It was reported that only Roman submitted his candidacy, under the ruling Lakas–NUCD; the commission explained that Garcia is not required to submit his candidacy.

== Campaign ==
Garcia then sought to disqualify Roman from running, citing he had an election billboard larger than the allowable size in Balanga; meanwhile, the COMELEC investigated Garcia for having advertisements favoring him in Manila newspapers. The COMELEC then dismissed an attempt by Garcia to stop the election via a technicality, saying that it assumes all expenses for recall elections under the national budget via its contingency fund. Both candidates were then accused of buying votes.

On the eve of the election, the COMELEC deputized the Philippine National Police (PNP) to keep the peace, of which 538 came from Bataan PNP, and 300 came from the Central Luzon PNP in San Fernando, Pampanga. Both candidates have claimed to have the support of the ruling Lakas–NUCD of president Fidel V. Ramos.

== Results ==
There were about 266,500 registered voters for the recall election. The police estimated support to be at 52:48 in favor of Roman. The COMELEC, on criticism that it scheduled the election during the Christmas season, countered that it will be more expensive to hold it on the following year. They also expressed optimism that either candidate will be proclaimed on election night.

The Iglesia ni Cristo (INC) reportedly boycotted the election, instructing its 15,000 adherents in Bataan to abstain from voting, with expulsion from the church being the penalty if one voted. The INC's support has been credited with Garcia's victory in 1992. Garcia had been trailing in the INC's surveys prior to the election, but he countered by saying that "things are different now" as he is now the incumbent. The COMELEC reported no acts of violence during election day.

During the canvassing of votes, Garcia's camp had petitioned to prevent votes from certain places from being counted. By December 23, only ballots from Dinalupihan, considered a stronghold of Roman, were remaining to be counted, with Roman leading by 574 votes. The next day, canvassing of votes was finished, but the COMELEC could not declare a winner because disqualification cases were still pending. Roman emerged with a lead of almost 4,000 votes.

1993 Bataan gubernatorial recall election
| Candidate | Party | Votes | % |
|---|---|---|---|
| Ding Roman | Lakas–NUCD | 77,892 | 51.30 |
| Tet Garcia | Nationalist People's Coalition | 73,958 | 48.70 |
| Total | | 151,850 | 100.00 |
| Registered voters/turnout | | 266,542 | 56.97 |
| Majority | | 3,934 | 2.59 |
| Lakas–NUCD gain from Nationalist People's Coalition | | | |

Results per municipality
| Municipality | Garcia | Roman | Percent of valid votes |
|---|---|---|---|
| Abucay | 6,219 / 5,719 | | 7.86% |
| Bagac | 3,933 / 3,043 | | 4.59% |
| Balanga | 10,503 / 10,111 | | 13.58% |
| Dinalupihan | 5,112 / 9,848 | | 9.85% |
| Hermosa | 4,434 / 6,971 | | 7.51% |
| Limay | 5,883 / 5,434 | | 7.45% |
| Mariveles | 9,770 / 8,636 | | 12.12% |
| Morong | 3,259 / 3,196 | | 4.25% |
| Orani | 8,377 / 9,113 | | 11.52% |
| Orion | 9,059 / 5,153 | | 9.36% |
| Pilar | 5,172 / 5,082 | | 6.75% |
| Samal | 2,237 / 5,586 | | 5.15% |
| Bataan | 73,958 / 77,892 | | 100% |

The commission gave Garcia five working days to submit his pre-proclamation protests. They gave February 10, 1994 the earliest date that they can resolve the issue. People from Bataan expressed disappointment with the delay of the proclamation, as Garcia protested the inclusion of 99 election returns from Dinalupihan.

The COMELEC heard Garcia's petitions to disqualify Roman. They then dismissed all petitions, but ordered recanvassing of votes from the questioned municipalities. In March 1994, the Supreme Court stopped the COMELEC and the Bataan provincial board of canvassers in proclaiming Roman as the winner until the COMELEC has decided on the disqualification case against him. The COMELEC would have proclaimed Roman as the winner on the following week if not for the court preventing them from doing so. By April, the COMELEC's first division dismissed another petition from Garcia, this time saying that it was Roman who was behind the "boycott the (recall) polls" leaflets from helicopters on polling day, supposedly dissuading his voters from turning out. A day later, the Supreme Court dismissed Roman's petition to lift the restraining order on the proclamation of the winner.

On June 17, 1994. the COMELEC en banc reaffirmed its dismissal of Garcia's petition regarding the leaflets dropped on polling day; notably, chairman Christian Monsod was the sole dissenting vote. On the next day, the Supreme Court dismissed the petition of Garcia suspending Roman's proclamation as the winner. On June 28, 1994, the COMELEC proclaimed Roman as the winner of the election. The governor-elect offered to make Garcia, his cousin, a consultant to the government.

== Aftermath ==
Roman successfully defended the governorship in 1995, 1998 and 2001, with him getting 97% of the vote in the last election. There were petitions to disqualify Roman in 2001 as he had supposedly served three consecutive terms, but the Supreme Court ruled that terms won on recall elections do not count as it is an interruption of a full term. Garcia pursued a congressional career, serving from 1995 to 2004. In 2004, Garcia won the governorship, as his son Albert defeated Roman for congressman from Bataan's 2nd district. Garcia was reelected in 2007 and 2010, returned to Congress in 2013, and was elected as vice governor in 2016 when he died prior to taking office.

The method of using the preparatory recall assembly to initiate recall petitions was repealed under Republic Act No. 9244 in 2004.
