= Tomás del Rosario =

Filipino politician (1857–1913)

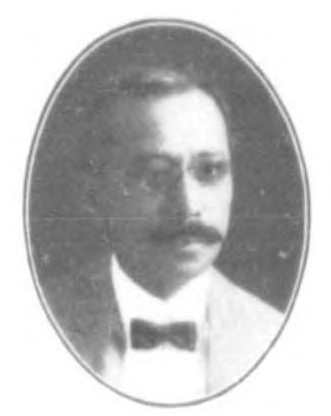
- Del Rosario as member of the Philippine Assembly, c. 1912

Member of the Philippine Assembly from Bataan's at-large district
- In office 1909–1912
- Preceded by: José María Lerma
- Succeeded by: Pablo Técson

Governor of Bataan
- In office 1903–1905
- Preceded by: Harry Goldman
- Succeeded by: Lorenzo Zialcita

Member of the Malolos Congress from Surigao
- In office September 15, 1898 – November 13, 1899 Serving with Timoteo Páez

Personal details
- Born: Tomás Guillermo del Rosario y Tongco; February 10, 1857 Binondo, Manila, Captaincy General of the Philippines
- Died: July 4, 1913 (aged 56) Balanga, Bataan, Philippine Islands
- Party: Progresista
- Spouse: Juana de los Reyes
- Children: 2

Tomás Guillermo del Rosario y Tongco (February 10, 1857 – July 4, 1913) was a Filipino judge and statesman who served as the first Governor of the province of Bataan from 1903 to 1905. He is remembered for advocating the separation of church and state.

== Biography ==
Del Rosario was born to Cipriano del Rosario and Severina Tongco in Binondo, Manila. He was a judge of the First Instance of Manila from 1888 to 1896. He was deported to Ceuta, Africa from 1896 to 1897 for alleged involvement in the revolution. Upon his return, he became a delegate of Surigao in the Malolos Congress in 1898 and delegate to the Philippine Assembly from 1909 to 1912.

== Legacy ==
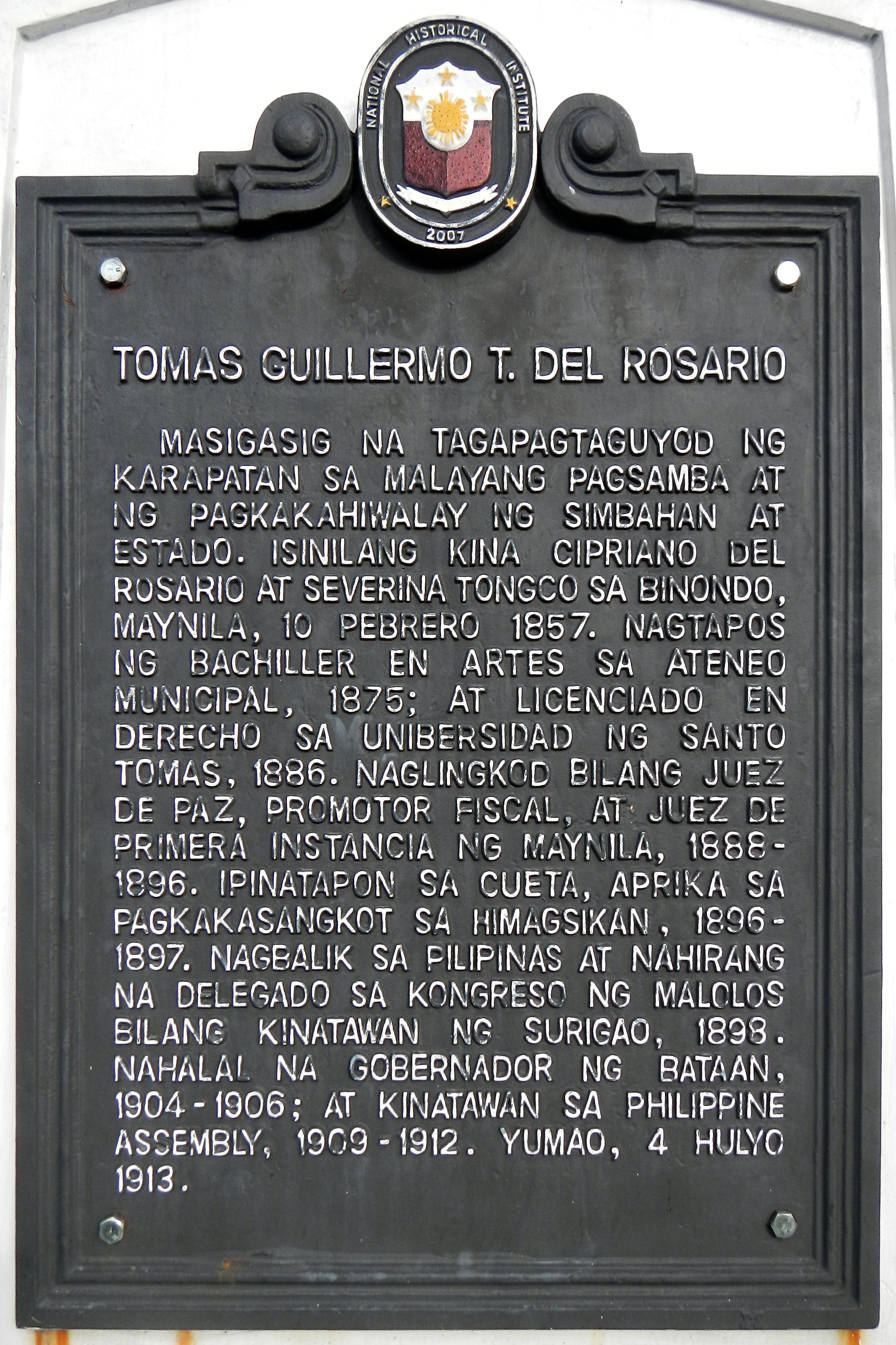
National Historical Institute historical marker for del Rosario found in front of the Bataan Capitol.

On 2007, the National Historical Institute and provincial government of Bataan unveiled the Gov. Tomás del Rosario marker at the compound in front of the provincial capitol in Balanga.
