= Tet Garcia =

Filipino politician (1940–2016)

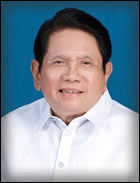
- Garcia official portrait during the 16th Congress

Vice Governor-elect of Bataan
- In role May 11, 2016 – June 13, 2016

23rd Governor of Bataan
- In office June 30, 2004 – June 30, 2013
- Vice Governor: Benjamin Alonzo (2004–2007); Serafin Roman (2007–2010); Efren B. Pascual (2010–2013)
- Preceded by: Ding Roman
- Succeeded by: Albert Garcia
- In office June 30, 1992 – June 27, 1994
- Vice Governor: Efren B. Pascual
- Preceded by: Leonardo B. Roman
- Succeeded by: Leonardo B. Roman

Member of the Philippine House of Representatives from Bataan's 2nd congressional district
- In office June 30, 2013 – June 13, 2016
- Preceded by: Albert Garcia
- Succeeded by: Joet Garcia
- In office June 30, 1995 – June 30, 2004
- Preceded by: Dominador N. Venegas
- Succeeded by: Albert Garcia
- In office June 30, 1987 – June 30, 1992
- Preceded by: Position established
- Succeeded by: Dominador N. Venegas

Personal details
- Born: Enrique Tuason Garcia Jr. September 13, 1940 Pasay, Rizal, Philippine Commonwealth
- Died: June 13, 2016 (aged 75) Makati, Metro Manila, Philippines
- Party: NUP (2011–2016); Partido Balikatan ng Bataan (local party)
- Other political affiliations: Lakas-CMD (1999–2011); LDP (1991–1999); PDP-Laban (1987–1991)
- Spouse: Victoria Sandejas-Garcia
- Children: Anna, Gila, Abet, Joet, Francis
- Education: De La Salle University

Enrique "Tet" Tuason Garcia Jr. (September 13, 1940 – June 13, 2016) was a Filipino politician who served as the governor of Bataan from 1992 until 1994, and again from 2004 until 2013. He served five non-consecutive terms as a congressman from Bataan's 2nd congressional district. He died during his third stint in the House in 2016.

== Early life and education ==
Enrique "Tet" Garcia Jr. was born on September 13, 1940 in Pasay to Enrique Garcia Sr. and Emiliana Tuazon Garcia. He is the eldest of 10 children of his parents.

As a child, Garcia attended Balanga Elementary School from 1947 to 1953. He attended Bataan National High School from 1953 to 1957, graduating as the Salutatorian of the class.

He attended De La Salle College and earned his bachelor's degree in business administration in 1963.

== Political career ==
=== House of Representatives ===
Garcia entered politics in 1987 when he was elected Congressman representing the 2nd district of Bataan. He then returned to Congress in 2013 as the representative of Bataan's 2nd district, serving for one term.

=== Governor of Bataan ===
In 1992, he was elected as the Governor of Bataan. He lost a recall election in 1993. He later returned to serve as Congressman from Bataan's 2nd district from 1995 to 2004. In 2004, he was elected again as Governor of Bataan, and won reelection in 2007. He ran as the incumbent Governor of Bataan in the 2010 elections, and won with 212,808 votes, which resulted in an almost 80,000 vote margin.

=== Vice governor of Bataan ===
In 2016, he successfully ran for Vice Governor of Bataan as the running mate of his son, Governor Albert Garcia, but died on June 13, 2016, just days before he could assume office. He was 75.

== Legislation ==
=== Petrochemical Industry ===
During Garcia's first term in Congress, from 1987 to 1992, he became widely known for vigorously and ultimately successfully fighting to keep the petrochemical industry in the province of Bataan. Arguing that the transfer of the petrochemical plant to Batangas was unfair to Bataan and to the Philippines as a whole, he fought the plant's transfer all the way to the Supreme Court in a landmark case. On August 24, 1990, to emphasize his belief in the truth and importance of what he was fighting for, Garcia took an emphatic leave of absence from the House of Representatives and vowed to resign if the petrochemical plant's transfer was not stopped. Garcia had filed a petition before hand asking the Supreme Court to stop the transfer of the Petrochemical plant to Batangas. On November 9, 1990, the Supreme Court of the Philippines issued its final decision on Garcia's petition, G.R. No. 92024

=== Bataan Polytechnic State College ===
In February 1998, Garcia was able to get his bill creating the Bataan Polytechnic State College (now the Bataan Peninsula State University) passed into law, titled Republic Act No. 8562.

=== Cityhood of Balanga ===
During his congressional term from 1998 to 2001, Garcia was able to get his bill converting the municipality of Balanga into a city, passed into law in December 2000.

=== Taxation ===
From 2000 to 2003, Garcia devised and recommended simple solutions on how to stop the BIR check tax payment loopholes in the Bureau of Internal Revenue.

On October 27, 2003, the Department of Finance finally adopted Garcia's recommendations by issuing Clearing House Operating Memo (CHOM) No. 375.

On May 9, 2008, the Philippine Clearing House Corporation through Clearing House Operating Memo (CHOM) No. 427, adopted an additional recommendation of Garcia, which was to have the name of the government institution indicated on the tracer band to be painted/sprayed at the back of the checks. According to the memo, this would act as an "additional control/tracing point for the banks in proving their inward cheques that are payable to the BIR or BOC."

=== Bataan Iskolar Ng Bayan Program ===
The provincial government of Bataan under Governor Garcia started the Iskolar ng Bayan scholarship program for college students in 2004. As of early 2010, there were 9000 current scholars. The scholarship program is open to college level students who are permanent residents of Bataan. The scholarship can be used for any college level institution, whether inside or outside the province.

In 2008, Garcia's office contributed ₱20,000,000 (equivalent to ₱30,093,170 in 2021) to the program, while Congressman Albert Garcia of the 2nd district of Bataan contributed ₱10,000,000 (equivalent to ₱15,046,585 in 2021) to the program. Mayor Joet Garcia further contributed ₱10,000,000 to the program.

=== Mandanas–Garcia Ruling ===
During his tenure as Governor, Garcia and Batangas Governor Hermilando Mandanas petitioned Supreme Court of the Philippines for a higher share of national internal revenue taxes for local government units, leading to the Mandanas-Garcia Ruling, named after them.
