= Ding Roman =

Philippine politician

22nd Governor of Bataan
- In office June 28, 1994 – June 30, 2004
- Vice Governor: Efren B. Pascual (1994–1995); Serafin Roman (1995–1998); Rogelio Roque (1998–2004)
- Preceded by: Enrique "Tet" Garcia
- Succeeded by: Enrique "Tet" Garcia
- In office March 26, 1986 – June 30, 1992
- Preceded by: Efren B. Pascual
- Succeeded by: Enrique "Tet" Garcia

Personal details
- Born: July 9, 1946 (age 79) Manila, Philippines
- Party: Nationalist People's Coalition
- Spouse: Carmencita Francisco Roman
- Children: Happy, Bai Soraya, Martina Alexandria, Martin Kristoffer, Martina Jean Victoria, Martin Leonardo Jr., and Martina Joaquin
- Profession: Politician

Leonardo "Ding" Banzon Roman (born July 9, 1946) is a Filipino politician who was the governor of the province of Bataan. He served the province as its governor for seventeen years from 1986 to 2004, having won a total of four gubernatorial elections following his appointment as officer-in-charge of Bataan during the Presidency of Corazon Aquino.

== Biography ==
Roman was born on July 9, 1946, in Manila to parents, Pablo Roman and Victoria Banzon Roman. His father, a former Bataan congressman, founded the first free trade zone in the Philippines called the Bataan Export Processing Zone (BEPZ), which paved the way for the construction of a Roman Superhighway from Dinalupihan to Mariveles. His surname, Roman, was first recognized in Bataan when his grandfather, Sotero, became Pilar's town official in the 1930s.

He attended secondary school at Letran College at Intramuros, Manila. He then took Bachelor of Science in Business Administration, Major in Marketing at Saint Joseph's University in Philadelphia, Pennsylvania, United States of America. Upon graduating college, he worked in the private sector for sixteen years before entering public service.

He is married to Carmencita Francisco Roman and has seven children. His eldest son, Atty. Martin Kristoffer "Kris" Roman, was appointed by President Rodrigo Duterte as assistant secretary at the Office of the President in 2017.

Roman is also the cousin of the late Representative Tony Roman, who is the father of Representative Geraldine Roman.

== Political career ==
Roman started his political career in 1980 when he became president of the Nacionalista Party. He opposed the imposition of martial law under Ferdinand Marcos.

In 1986, President Corazon C. Aquino appointed Roman as officer-in-charge (OIC) of the Governor's Office of the province of Bataan. Roman served as such until 1988. Thereafter, he was elected by popular vote as Bataan's Provincial Governor and served the said province as such from 1988 until 1992. In the 1992 elections, Roman lost to Enrique Garcia for the same position. Following a recall election against Garcia in 1993, Roman won and became the Governor of Bataan until 1995. After this term, Roman ran again for Bataan's Provincial Governor in the three consecutive elections of 1995, 1998 and 2001, winning each of them and serving the province as such until 2004.

=== Accomplishments ===
Roman initiated the solicitation of sixty seven locators and business investors for the Bataan Export Processing Zone (BEPZ), which used to cater to only sixteen companies before his term as governor. Roman's efforts led to industrial peace and economic progress in the province of Bataan. At present, people from Bataan enjoy the fruits of Roman's endeavors as the Bataan Export Processing Zone, now called the Freeport Area of Bataan since October 23, 2009, with the name was concurrently used with the BEPZ/Bataan Economic Zone (BEZ) names as the zone's secondary name when Authority of the Freeport Area of Bataan (AFAB) partially operated and managed the zone along with PEZA as the latter still had remaining programs and plans over the zone for eight months from October 2009 until the abolishment of BEPZ/BEZ on June 30, 2010, as a result of the full turnover of the zone's operations and management from PEZA to AFAB the day before on June 29, is considered by many as the province's greatest asset.

With respect to infrastructure, Roman completed new road and improvement projects including, among others, the Bagac-Subic Road, the Bagac-Mariveles Bypass Road, the Morong-Dinalupihan Road, the Mabayo, Morong-Subic concreting, which led to the construction of resorts along Morong beaches, and the Orion and Limay Ports Development. Together with former SBMA Chairman Felicito "Tong" Payumo, Roman was instrumental in the construction of the Subic–Clark–Tarlac Expressway (SCTEx) and the formulation of Central Luzon Development Programs.

Roman was also able to successfully invite Letran, his alma mater, to establish a college in Abucay, Bataan, in order for students from the province to receive quality education without the need to migrate to Manila. Kalayaan College, a University of the Philippines-modeled college, founded by UP President Dr. Jose Abueva, also established its Abucay campus through the invitation of Roman.

Roman likewise founded the Bataan Child Empowerment Council, which promulgated the Early Childhood Care & Development Program. The program was used by the Senate of the Philippines and the House of Representatives of the Philippines as a model in enacting a law in early childhood care.

A known environmentalist, Roman initiated the successful "Kontra Kalat Sa Dagat" which won several awards and received praises both locally and internationally.

=== Programs ===
- Environment & Livelihood: Kontra Kalat sa Dagat—A coastal care program with the people of Bataan gathering together at least once a month for a massive cleanup of the province's portion of Manila Bay.
- Bataan Child Empowerment Council—A program enriching the daycare system and introducing new innovations of taking care of children.
- Teachers on the move—A new method of teaching was introduced to Bataan teachers through continuous learning of modern English and Math under the concept of “Once a teacher, always a student.”
- Klaseng Ibang Klase—A vocational and technical course where a vocational school, sponsored by the local government and TESDA would go to the barangays for their five-hour/five-day class schedule and provide their students with opportunities for direct employment, either from local or international companies.

=== Awards ===
- Gawad sa Makataong Pag-unlad Award (for Bataan having the highest Human Development Index in the country) by Human Development Network with the United Nations Development Programme (1999, 2001).
- Galing Pook Award by Galing Pook Foundation and Ford International (2002).
- Local Government Leadership Award (as an outstanding chief executive of a province) by LGLA and Center for Local and Regional Governance, headed by former Senator Aquilino Pimentel Jr. and Mr. Jose V. Abueva (2002).
- Anvil Award by the Public Relations Society of the Philippines (2001, 2002).
- 1st Gold Quill Award by the International Association of Business Communicators (2002).
