= Bataan Provincial Building =

Government building in Bataan, Philippines

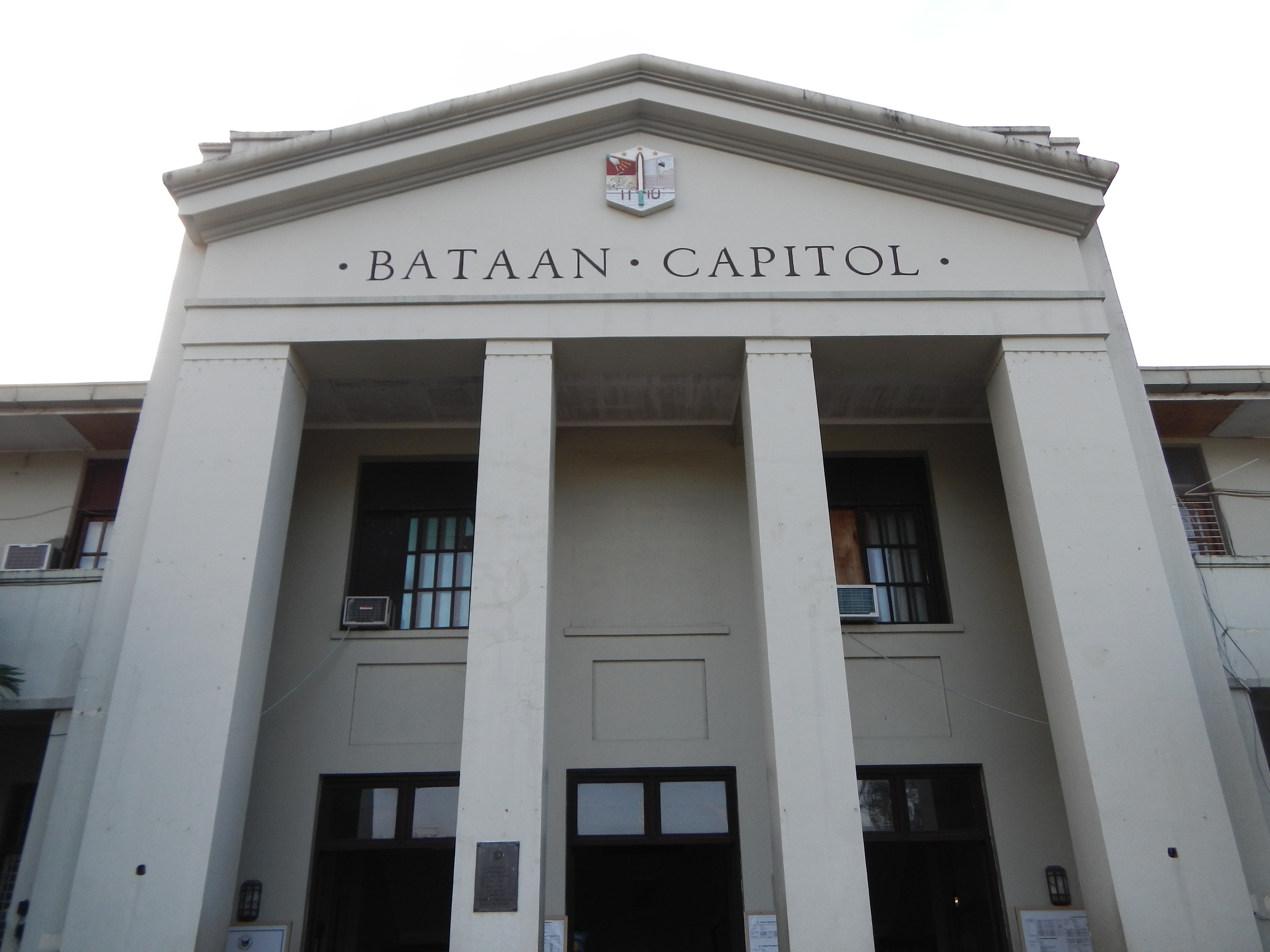
- Facade of Bataan Provincial Capitol in 2013
- Interactive map of the Bataan Provincial Building area
- Alternative names: Bataan Provincial Capitol; The Bunker

General information
- Location: Balanga, Bataan, Philippines
- Coordinates: 14°40′33″N 120°31′46″E
- Completed: 1950

The Bataan Provincial Building, Bataan Provincial Capitol, or The Bunker is the seat of the provincial government of Bataan in the Philippines.

The first provincial building was built in 1794, and later damaged by earthquakes in the mid-1800s. The building served as the office of the Bataan revolutionary government from 1898 to 1900, and as a school from 1903 to 1906.

The provincial capitol was damaged during the World War II, and later rebuilt in 1950.

== Present situation ==
In 2019, an extension of the provincial capitol known as "The Bunker" was built and completed adjacent to the older building. Since then, the older building has only served as entryway, and has been empty as offices were transferred to the newer section.

During the COVID-19 pandemic in 2020, the older building was converted as extension of the Bataan General Hospital and Medical Center to accommodate hospital patients.

In 2025, the old section of the capitol underwent renovation for its conversion to Bataan Provincial Museum and Library.

== Historical markers ==
In 1939, the Philippines Historical Committee (PHC) installed a historical marker on the site. In 1952, in the grounds of the building, PHC installed a marker to commemorate the Fall of Bataan, a battle during World War II.

PHC became National Historical Commission and later renamed to National Historical Institute in 1972. In 2007, the institute again installed in the grounds a marker for Tomas del Rosario, who served as the first governor of the province.

== Gallery ==
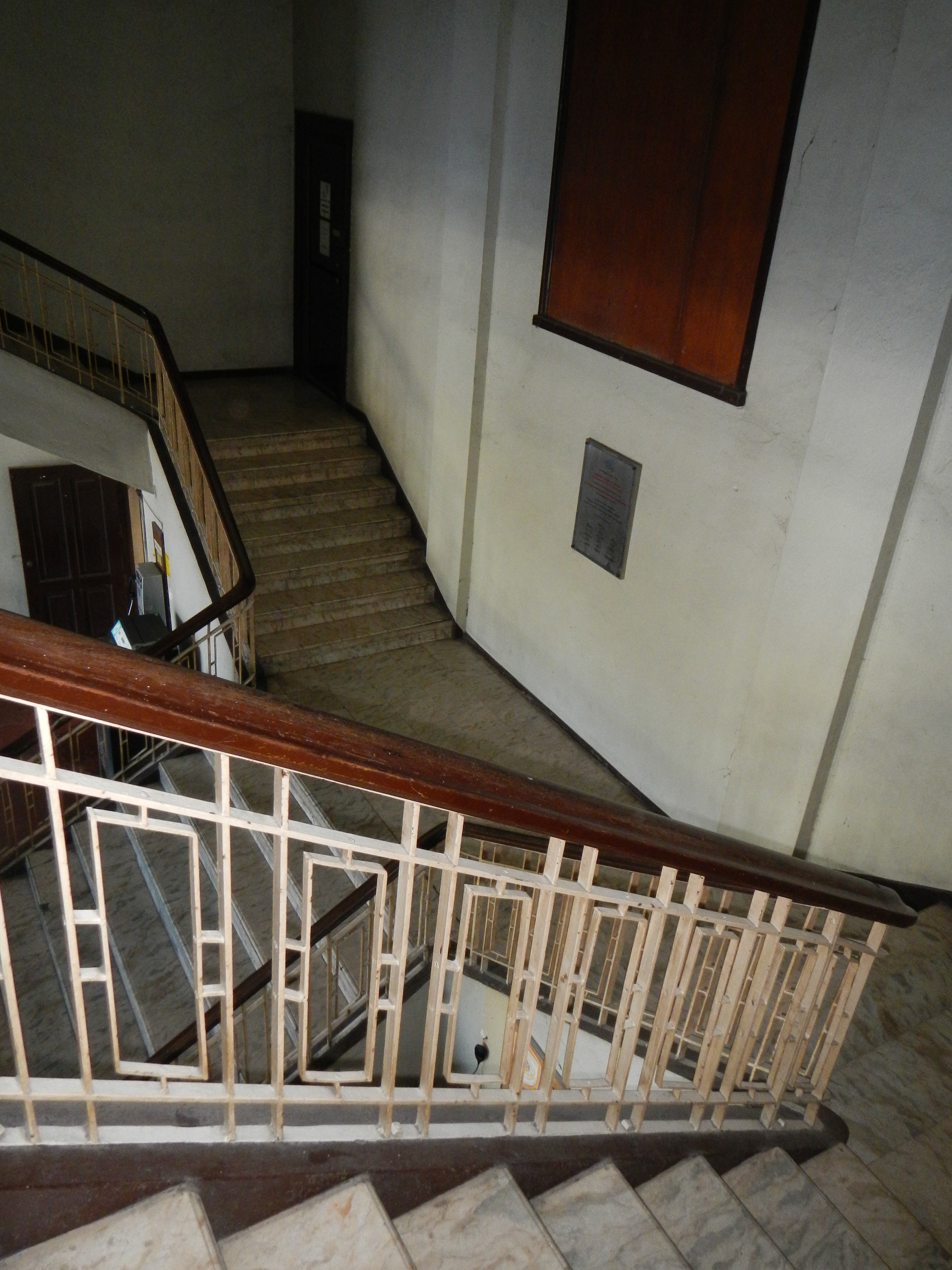
Stairs

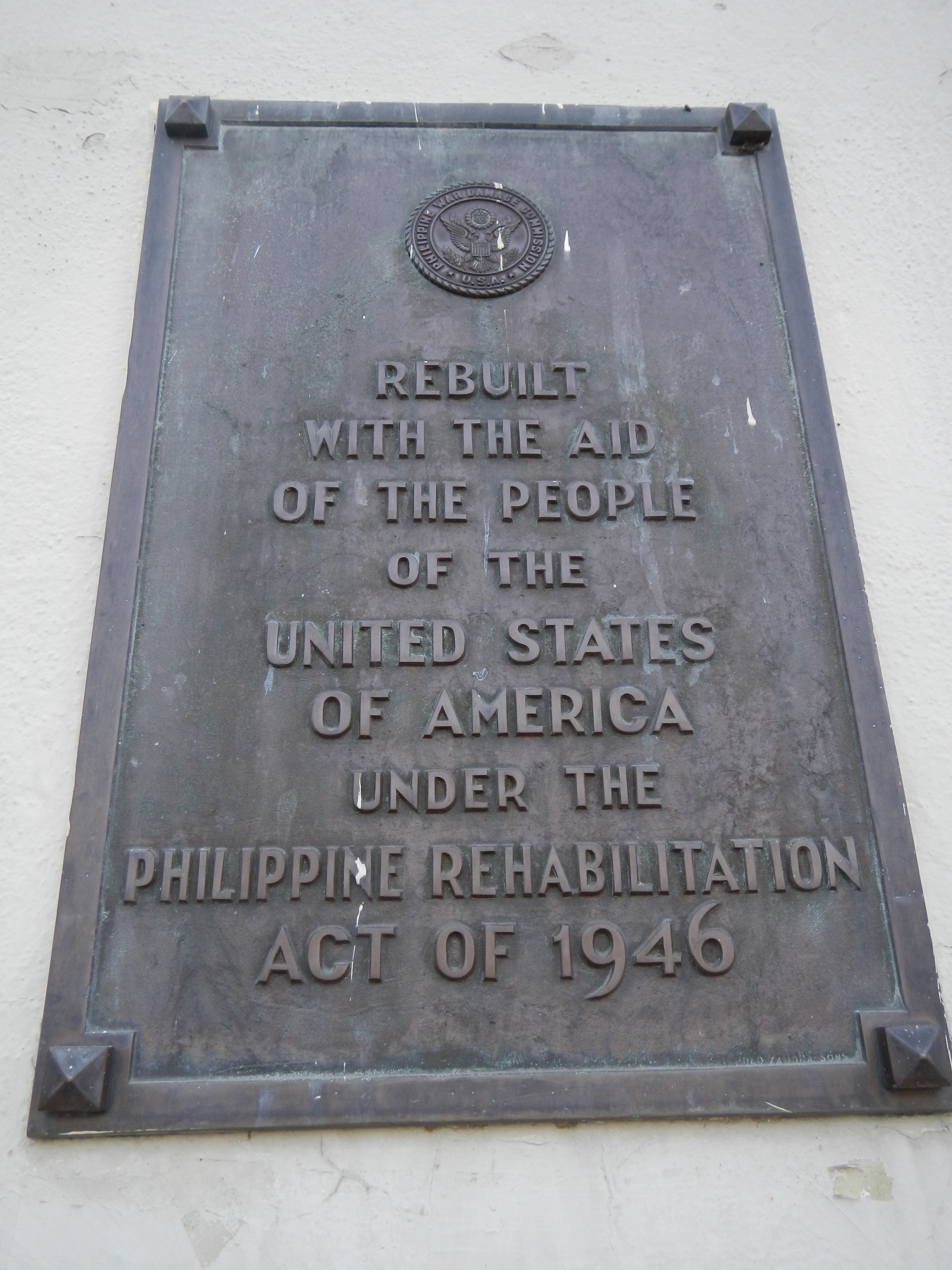
Marker

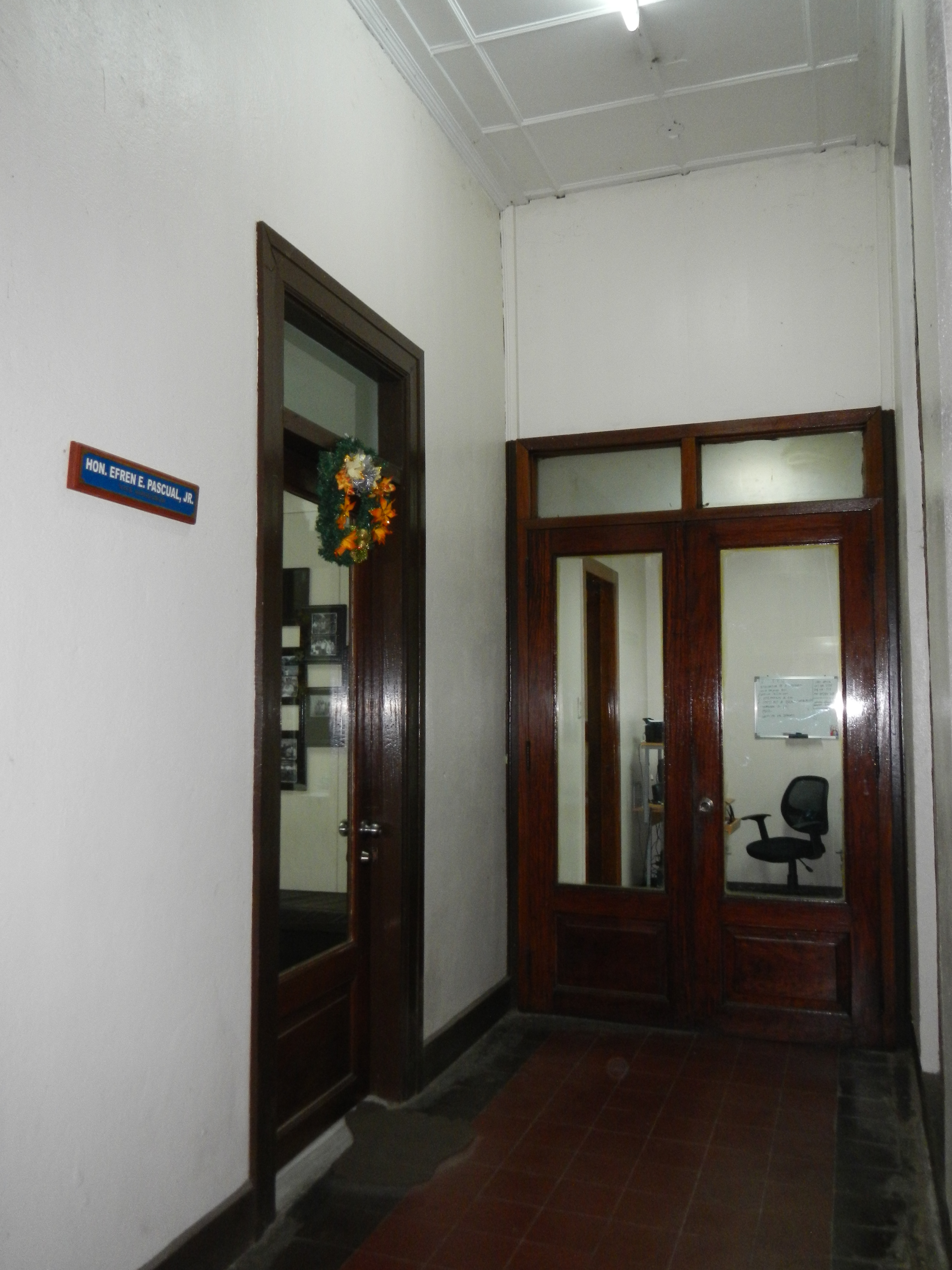
Office

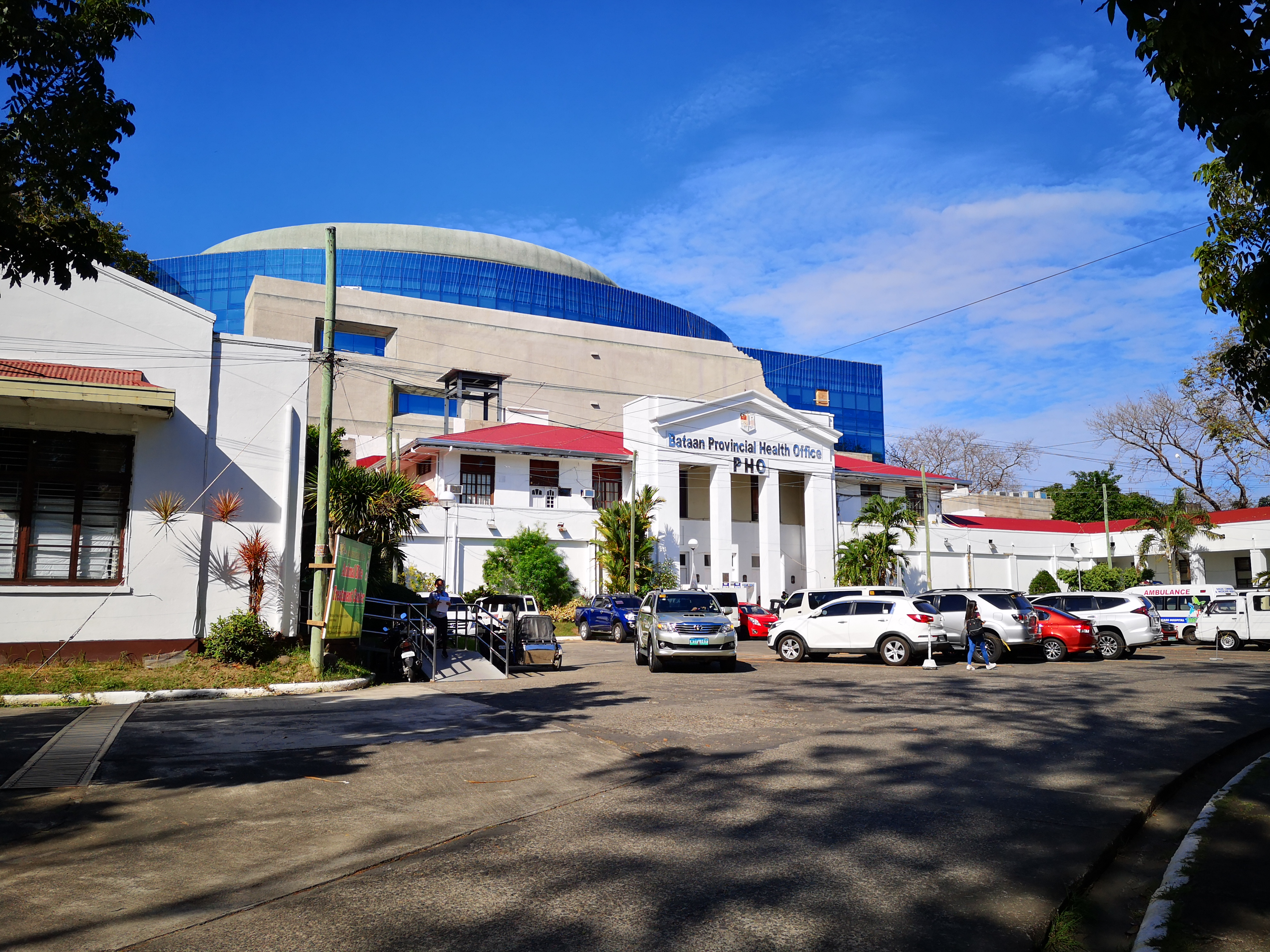
Building in 2022
