= Governor of Bataan =

Local chief executive

- Punong Lalawigan ng Bataan
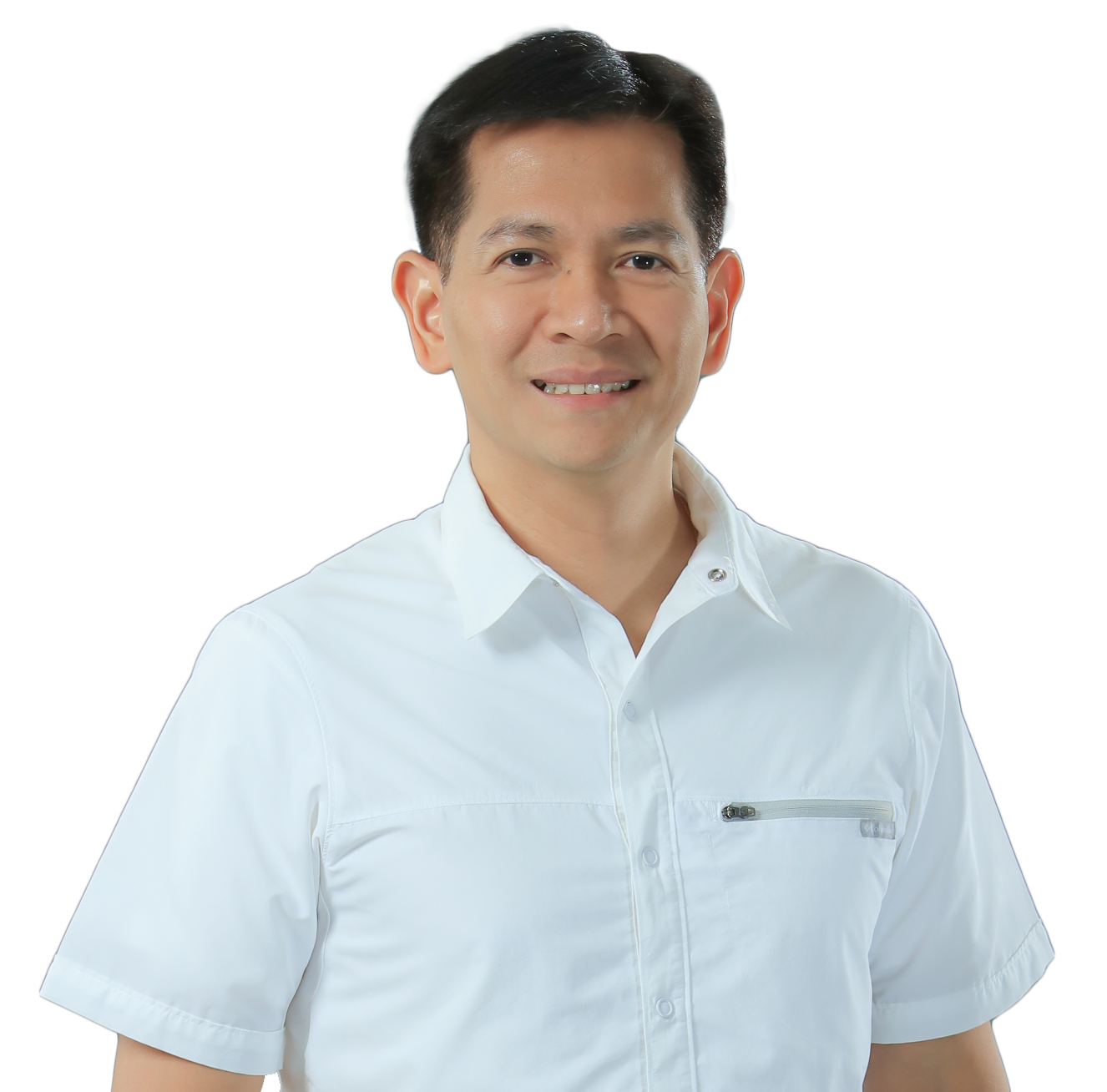
- Incumbent; Jose Enrique S. Garcia III since June 30, 2022
- Style: The Provincial Governor, The Honourable
- Residence: Provincial Capitol Complex, Balanga, Bataan
- Term length: 3 years and 3 terms
- Inaugural holder: Harry Gouldman
- Formation: 1901
- Website: www.bataan.gov.ph

The following is a list of all the governors of Bataan, Philippines, from 1901 to the present.

== List of governors of Bataan ==
No.	Image	Governor	Term
1		Harry Gouldman	1901–1903
2		Tomás del Rosario	1903–1905
3		Lorenzo Zialcita	1905–1907
4		Pedro J. Rich	1907–1909
5		Mariano Rosauro	1909–1912
6		Maximino R. de los Reyes	1912–1916
7		Conrado Lerma	1916–1918
—		Pedro J. Rich	1918–1919
8		Alberto Aquino	1919–1922
9		Manuel Aguinaldo	1922–1925
10		Gregorio Quicho	1925–1931
11		Sabino de Leon	1931–1934
—		Alberto Aquino	1934–1937
12		Joaquin J. Linao	1937–1940
13		Jose Manahan	1940–1941
14		Jose S. Manahan	1941–1942
15		Simeon Salonga	1942–1945
16		Teodoro Camacho	1945–1946
—		Joaquin J. Linao	1946–1947
17		Emilio Ma. Naval	1948–1951
18		Adelmo Camacho	1952–1955
—		Emilio Ma. Naval	1956–1959
19		Pedro Reyes Dizon	1960–1967
20		Guillermo Arcenas	1968–1971
21		Efren B. Pascual Sr.	1972–1986
22		Leonardo Roman	1986–1992
23		Enrique Garcia Jr.	1992–1994
—		Leonardo Roman	1994–2004
—		Enrique Garcia Jr.	2004–2013
24		Albert Garcia	2013–2022
25		Jose Enrique Garcia	2022–present
