= Samal, Bataan =

Municipality in Bataan, Philippines

Samal
- Municipality
- Municipality of Samal
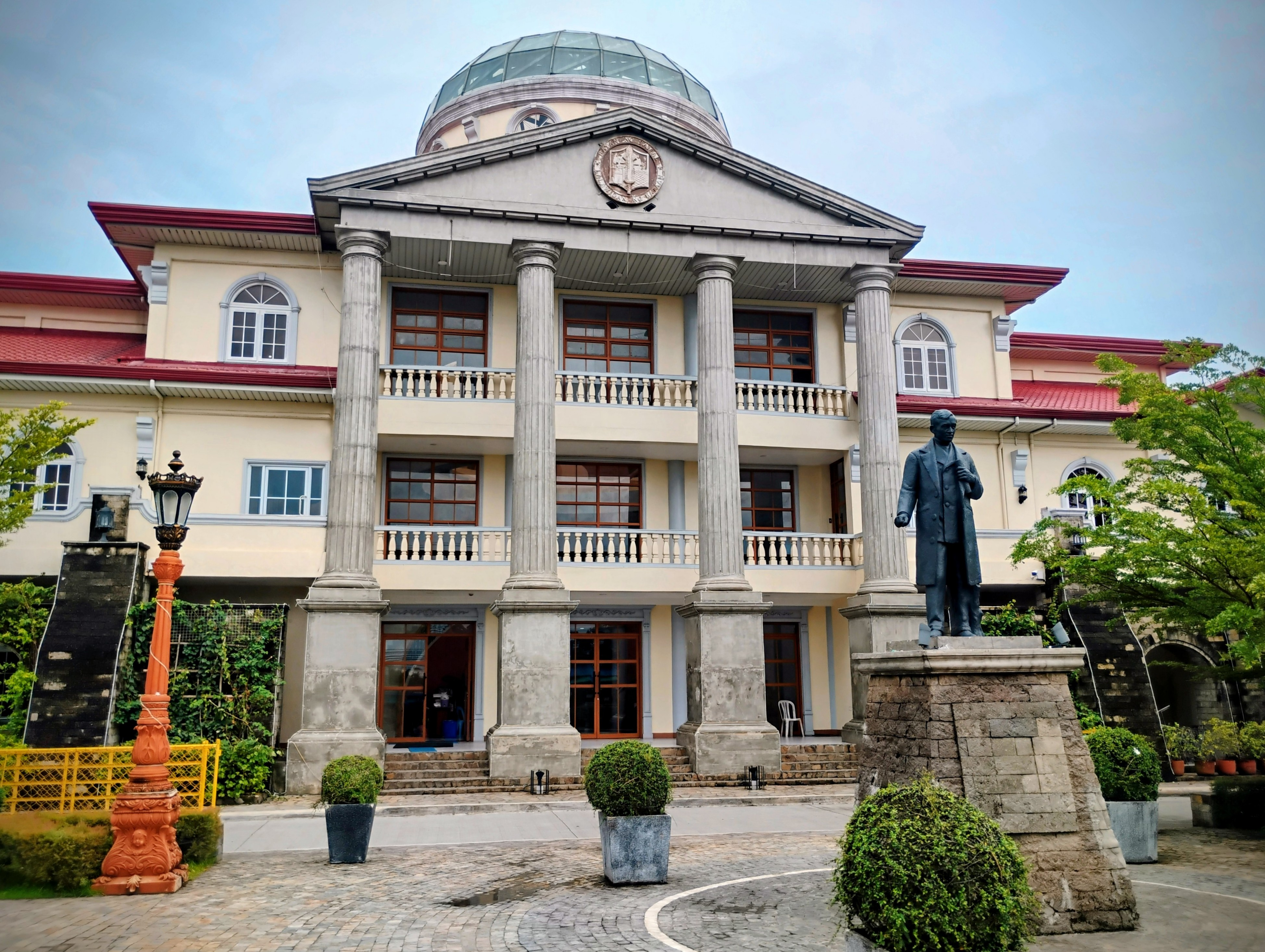
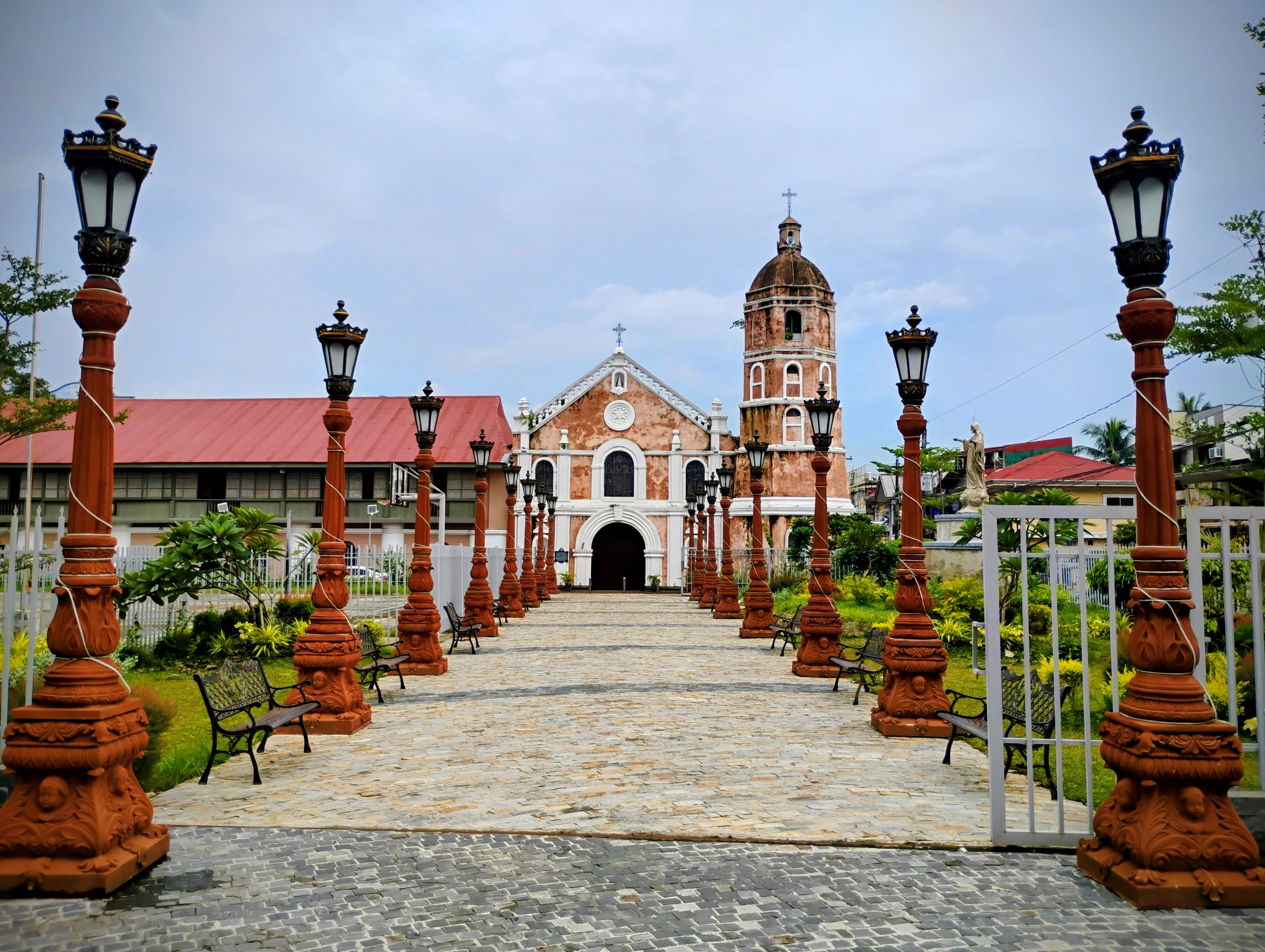
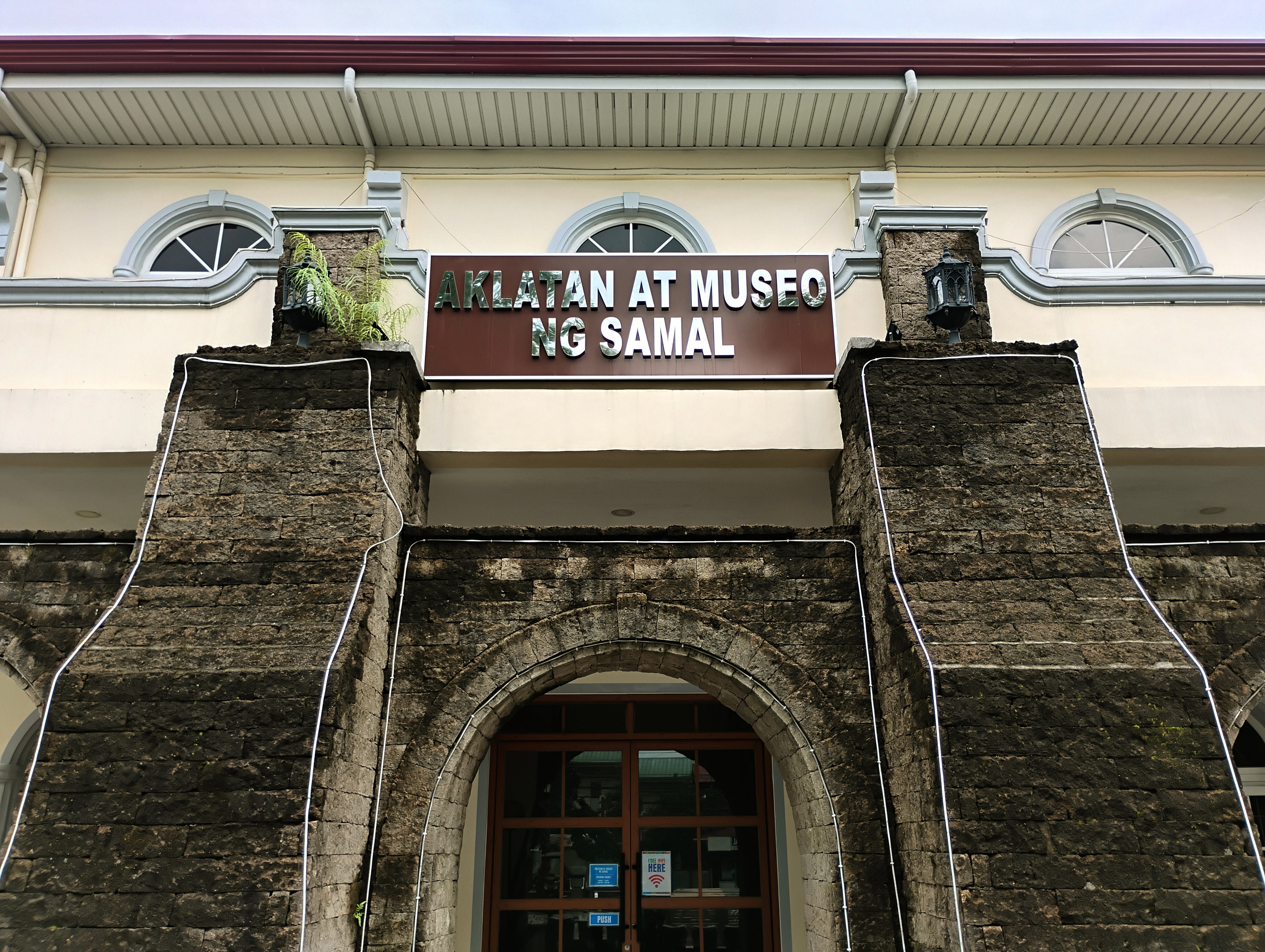
- Samal Municipal Hall Saint Catherine of Siena Parish Church Samal Library and Museum

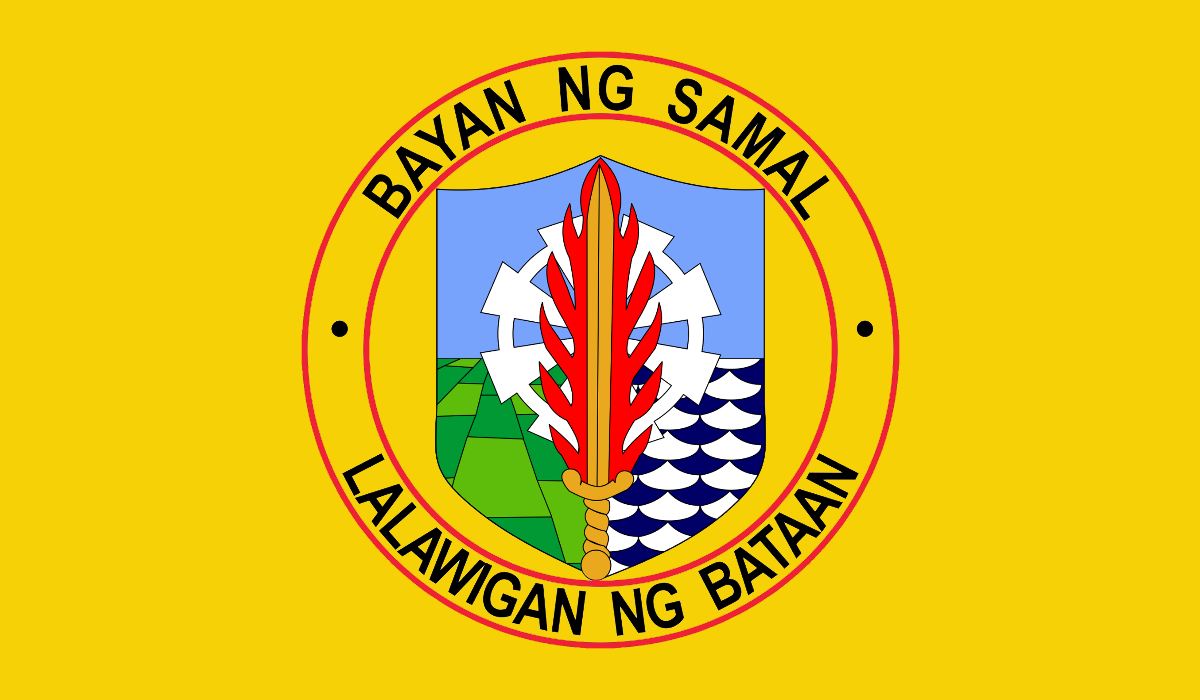
- Flag Seal

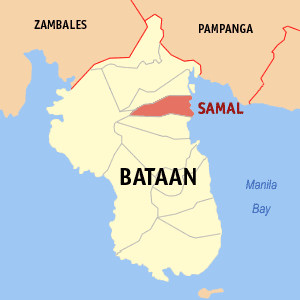
- Map of Bataan with Samal highlighted
- Interactive map of Samal
- Location within the Philippines
- Coordinates: 14°46′04″N 120°32′35″E
- Country: Philippines
- Region: Central Luzon
- Province: Bataan
- District: 1st district
- Founded: 1699
- Barangays: 14 (see Barangays)

Government
  - Type: Sangguniang Bayan
  - Mayor: Alexander C. Acuzar
  - Vice Mayor: Ronald M. Ortiguerra
  - Representative: Antonino B. Roman III
  - Municipal Council: Members: Marjun Q. Bantay; Lolito S. Llanda; Erval V. Flores; Kathrina A. Saldaña; Dylan M. House; Evangeline G. Buensuceso; Edgardo I. De Leon; Jaime M. Manguiat
  - Electorate: 30,580 voters (2025)

Area
  - Total: 56.30 km^{2} (21.74 sq mi)
- Elevation: 15 m (49 ft)
- Highest elevation: 133 m (436 ft)
- Lowest elevation: 0 m (0 ft)

Population (2024 census)
  - Total: 40,843
  - Density: 725.5/km^{2} (1,879/sq mi)
  - Households: 9,185

Economy
  - Income class: 2nd municipal income class
  - Poverty incidence: 8.81% (2023)
  - Revenue: ₱ 294.5 million (2024)
  - Assets: ₱ 457.1 million (2024)
  - Expenditure: ₱ 238.3 million (2024)
  - Liabilities: ₱ 4.301 million (2024)

Service provider
  - Electricity: Peninsula Electric Cooperative (PENELCO)
- Time zone: UTC+8 (PST)
- ZIP code: 2101
- PSGC: 0300812000
- IDD : area code: +63 (0)47
- Native languages: Mariveleño; Tagalog

Samal, officially the Municipality of Samal (Tagalog: Bayan ng Samal), is a municipality in the province of Bataan, Philippines. According to the 2024 census, it has a population of 40,843 people.

== Etymology ==
Samal originated from samel, a covering attached to a banca to protect the passengers from the sun and rain, made of nipa leaves and woven together.

== History ==
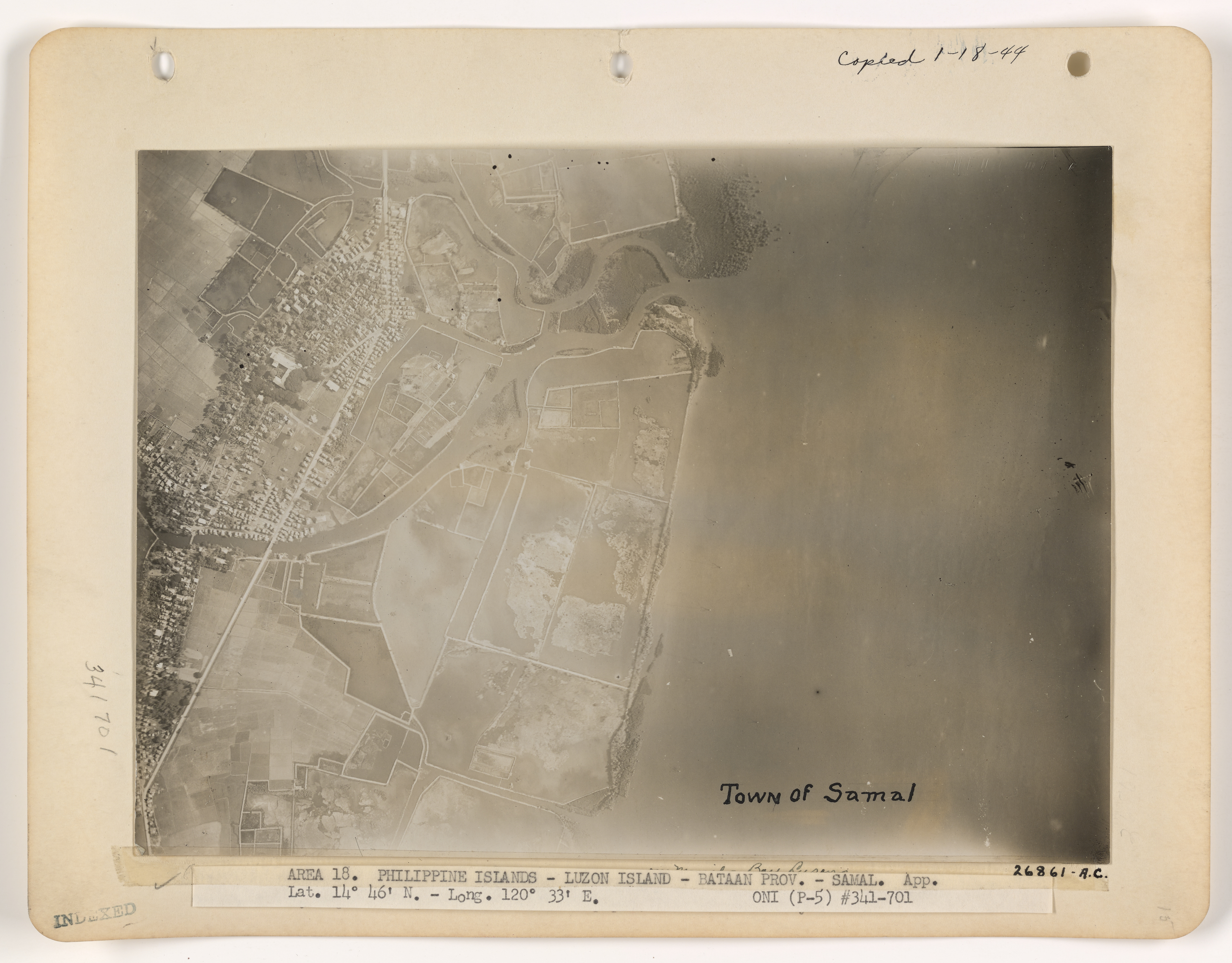
Aerial view of Samal, circa 1940s

Saint Catherine of Sienna became the patron of Samal when it was founded as a municipality on April 20, 1641.

"Sea gypsies" of Mindanao settlers ("Badjaos" who resided for many years in Maubac, Lambayung, Tanjung, Pata, Tapul, Lugus, Bangos, Pagasinan, Parang, Maimbung, Karugdung and Talipaw, Mindanao) migrated to Luzon in the early 14th century and settled in Bataan. In Samal, they propagated the pearl and capiz culture.

Samal was the second town founded by the Dominican friars in Bataan and is composed of four barrios: Calaguiman, Santa Lucia, Poblacion and Lalawigan.

The 1818 Spanish census showed there to be 1,000 native families and 4 Spanish-Filipino families.

== Geography ==
Samal is located in the eastern part of Bataan Peninsula, bordering Abucay to the south, Orani to the north and northwest, Morong to the west, and Manila Bay to the east. It is 11 kilometres (6.8 mi) from Balanga and 113 kilometres (70 mi) from Manila.

According to the Philippine Statistics Authority, the municipality has a land area of 56.30 square kilometres (21.74 sq mi) constituting 4.10% of the 1,372.98-square-kilometre- (530.11 sq mi) total area of Bataan.

=== Climate ===
Climate data for Samal, Bataan
Month	Jan	Feb	Mar	Apr	May	Jun	Jul	Aug	Sep	Oct	Nov	Dec	Year
Mean daily maximum °C (°F)	31 (88)	32 (90)	34 (93)	35 (95)	33 (91)	31 (88)	29 (84)	29 (84)	29 (84)	29 (84)	30 (86)	31 (88)	31 (88)
Mean daily minimum °C (°F)	19 (66)	19 (66)	20 (68)	23 (73)	25 (77)	25 (77)	24 (75)	25 (77)	25 (77)	24 (75)	23 (73)	20 (68)	23 (73)
Average precipitation mm (inches)	7 (0.3)	8 (0.3)	14 (0.6)	26 (1.0)	127 (5.0)	210 (8.3)	263 (10.4)	272 (10.7)	218 (8.6)	114 (4.5)	46 (1.8)	21 (0.8)	1,326 (52.3)
Average rainy days	4.0	4.0	6.9	11.2	21.0	24.5	27.4	26.9	25.9	21.9	13.4	6.3	193.4
Source: Meteoblue (modeled/calculated data, not measured locally)

=== Barangays ===
Samal is politically subdivided into 14 barangays. Each barangay consists of puroks and some have sitios.

PSGC	Barangay	Population			±% p.a.	
		2024		2010		
030812001	East Calaguiman (Poblacion)	6.3%	2,573	2,744	▾	−0.44%
030812002	East Daang Bago (Poblacion)	2.9%	1,169	1,195	▾	−0.15%
030812013	Gugo	9.2%	3,756	2,965	▴	1.65%
030812003	Ibaba (Poblacion)	7.9%	3,210	3,153	▴	0.12%
030812004	Imelda	6.5%	2,665	2,324	▴	0.95%
030812005	Lalawigan	9.6%	3,926	3,799	▴	0.23%
030812006	Palili	5.1%	2,092	1,865	▴	0.80%
030812008	San Juan (Poblacion)	10.4%	4,230	4,089	▴	0.24%
030812009	San Roque (Poblacion)	2.8%	1,159	1,154	▴	0.03%
030812010	Santa Lucia	6.1%	2,480	2,459	▴	0.06%
030812011	Sapa	9.0%	3,682	3,407	▴	0.54%
030812012	Tabing Ilog	5.3%	2,184	2,121	▴	0.20%
030812014	West Calaguiman (Poblacion)	3.5%	1,419	1,449	▾	−0.14%
030812015	West Daang Bago (Poblacion)	1.8%	753	854	▾	−0.87%
	Total		40,843	33,578	▴	1.37%

== Demographics ==
Population census of Samal

Year	Pop.	±% p.a.
1903	4,680	—
1918	5,231	+0.74%
1939	7,404	+1.67%
1948	6,995	−0.63%
1960	9,708	+2.77%
1970	15,002	+4.44%

Year	Pop.	±% p.a.
1975	16,731	+2.21%
1980	18,041	+1.52%
1990	21,991	+2.00%
1995	24,560	+2.09%
2000	27,410	+2.38%
2007	33,867	+2.96%

Year	Pop.	±% p.a.
2010	33,578	−0.31%
2015	35,298	+0.96%
2020	38,302	+1.73%
2024	40,843	+1.55%

Source: Philippine Statistics Authority

In the 2024 census, Samal had a population of 40,843 people. The population density was 730 inhabitants per square kilometre (1,900/sq mi).

== Economy ==
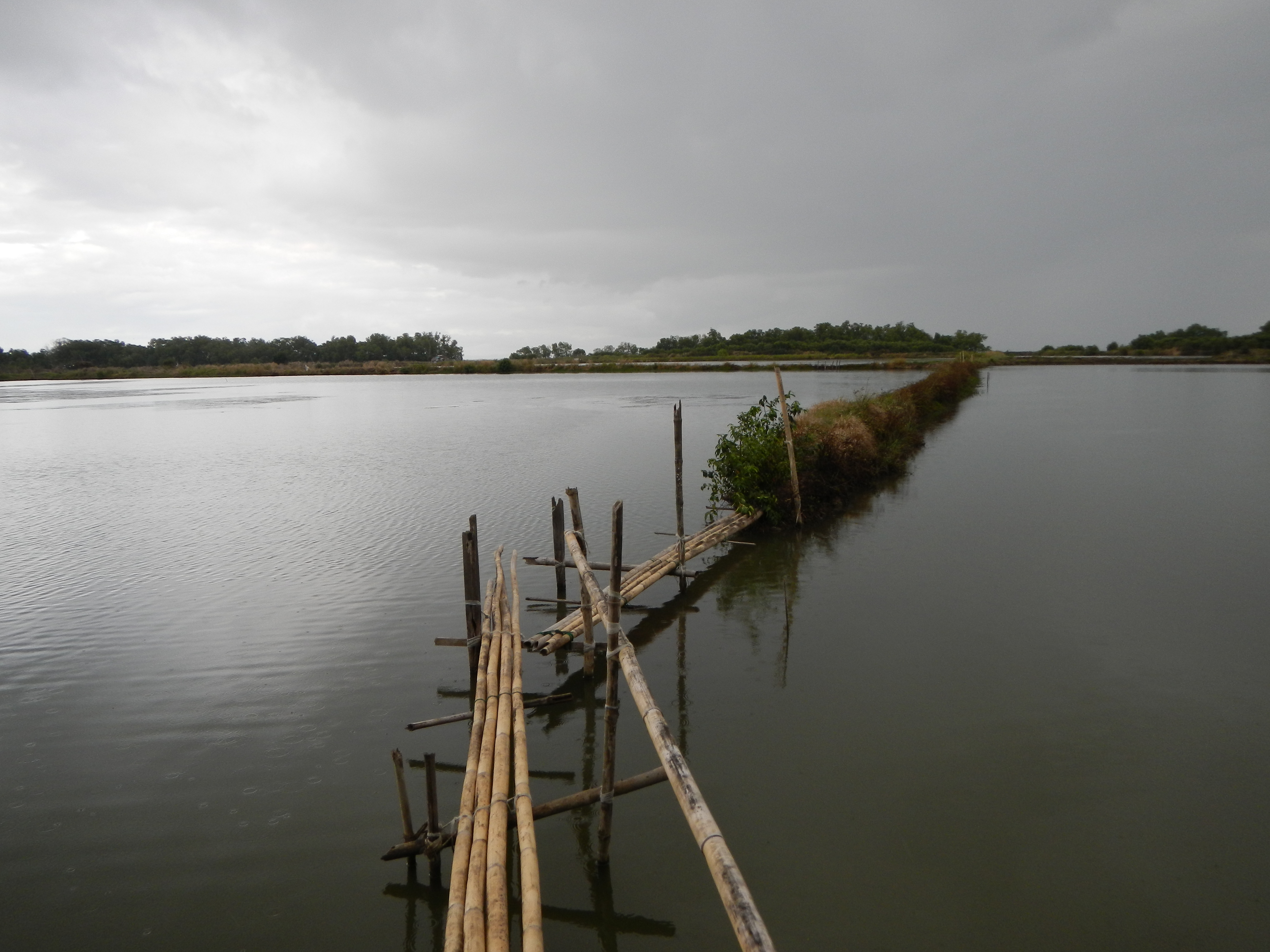
Bamboo structures of the ponds

Poverty incidence of Samal (%)

Source: Philippine Statistics Authority

Composed largely of uplands and hills with some lowlands and plains, Samal's main produce are palay, corn, vegetable, fruits, root crops, coffee and cut flowers, including livestock, poultry and aquatic resources such as shellfish, crabs, prawns, shrimps and different species of fish.

Joaquin Ma. Joson of Bataan established the first ice plant. Wooden shoe (bakya) making, and pulp mills (Bataan Pulp and Paper Mills, Inc. in the scenic slope of Mount Natib) are some of the industries of the natives. It also manufactures banana chips and arrow root flour through native processes, then made into cookies called araro as pasalubong. Samal is also rich is marine aquatic resources and highly productive farmlands.

Garments manufacturing in Samal is engaged in by five (5) firms already engaged in exports.

In the Town Hall of Samal and along the streets, Capiz shells are displayed to show that the town residents manufacture this commodity.

== Government ==
=== Local government ===
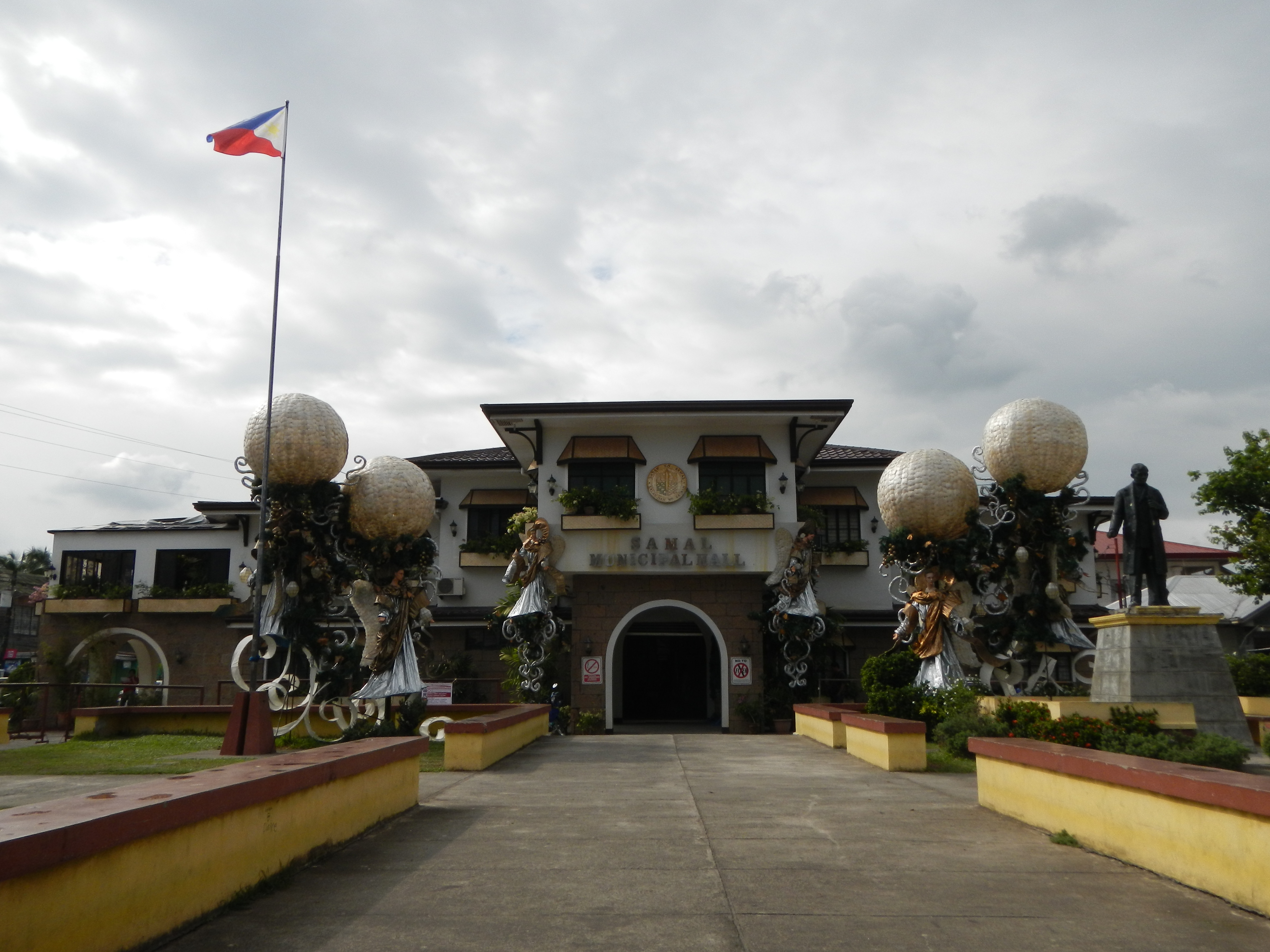
Municipal hall

Pursuant to the Local government in the Philippines", the political seat of the municipal government is located at the Municipal Hall. In the History of the Philippines (1521–1898), the Gobernadorcillo was the Chief Executive who held office in the Presidencia. During the American rule (1898–1946) (History of the Philippines (1898-1946)), the elected Mayor and local officials, including the appointed ones held office at the Municipal Hall. The legislative and executive departments perform their functions in the Sangguniang Bayan (Session Hall) and Municipal Trial Court, respectively, and are located in the Town Hall.

=== Elected officials ===
Members of the Samal Municipal Council (2022-2025)
Position	Name of official
District Representative (1st Legislative District, Bataan)	Geraldine B. Roman
Municipal Mayor	Alexander Carpio Acuzar
Municipal Vice Mayor	Ronald Medina Ortiguerra
Municipal Councilors	Marjun Q. Bantay
Municipal Councilors	Lolito S. Llanda
Municipal Councilors	Erval V. Flores
Municipal Councilors	Kathrina A. Saldaña
Municipal Councilors	Dylan M. House
Municipal Councilors	Evangeline G. Buensuceso
Municipal Councilors	Edgardo I. De Leon
Municipal Councilors	Jaime M. Manguiat

Samal's elected officials are - Mayor Alexander Carpio Acuzar (Liberal) and Vice Mayor Ronald Medina Ortiguerra (Liberal).

The Sangguniang Bayan Members are: Marjun Q. Bantay, Lolito S. Llanda, Erval V. Flores, Kathrina A. Saldaña, Dylan M. House, Evangeline G. Buensuceso, Edgardo I. De Leon and Jaime M. Manguiat. They hold office at the second floor of the Town Hall, particularly the Office of the Mayor and Sangguniang Bayan Session Hall, respectively.

The 2nd Municipal Circuit Trial Court of Orani-Samal MCTC Judge Ma. Cristina J. Mendoza-Pizzaro holds office in her sala located at the second floor of the MTC building at the back of the Orani Town hall.

== Tourism ==
Samal's attractions, events and historical landmarks include:

- Senakulo sa Calaguiman during Holy Week
- Samal Town Hall of and Samal Square
- Samel Festival
- Pilis Falls
- Samal Capiz Shell industry
- Fishponds, mangrove, mussels and seafoods in Samal Bay
- Saint Catherine of Siena Parish Church

== Education ==
The Samal Schools District Office governs all educational institutions within the municipality. It oversees the management and operations of all private and public, from primary to secondary schools.

=== Primary and elementary schools ===
- Adamson Elementary School
- Asuncion Consunji Memorial Elementary School
- Calaguiman Elementary School
- F.C. Del Rosario Elementary School
- Gugo Elementary School
- Lalawigan Elementary School
- New Christian Church School
- Palili Elementary School
- Saint Catherine of Siena Academy of Samal
- Samal Ecumenical Learning Center
- Samal North Elementary School
- Samal South Elementary School
- Sapa Elementary School
- Trinity United Methodist School

=== Secondary schools ===
- Samal National High School
- Samal National High School - Annex

== Gallery ==
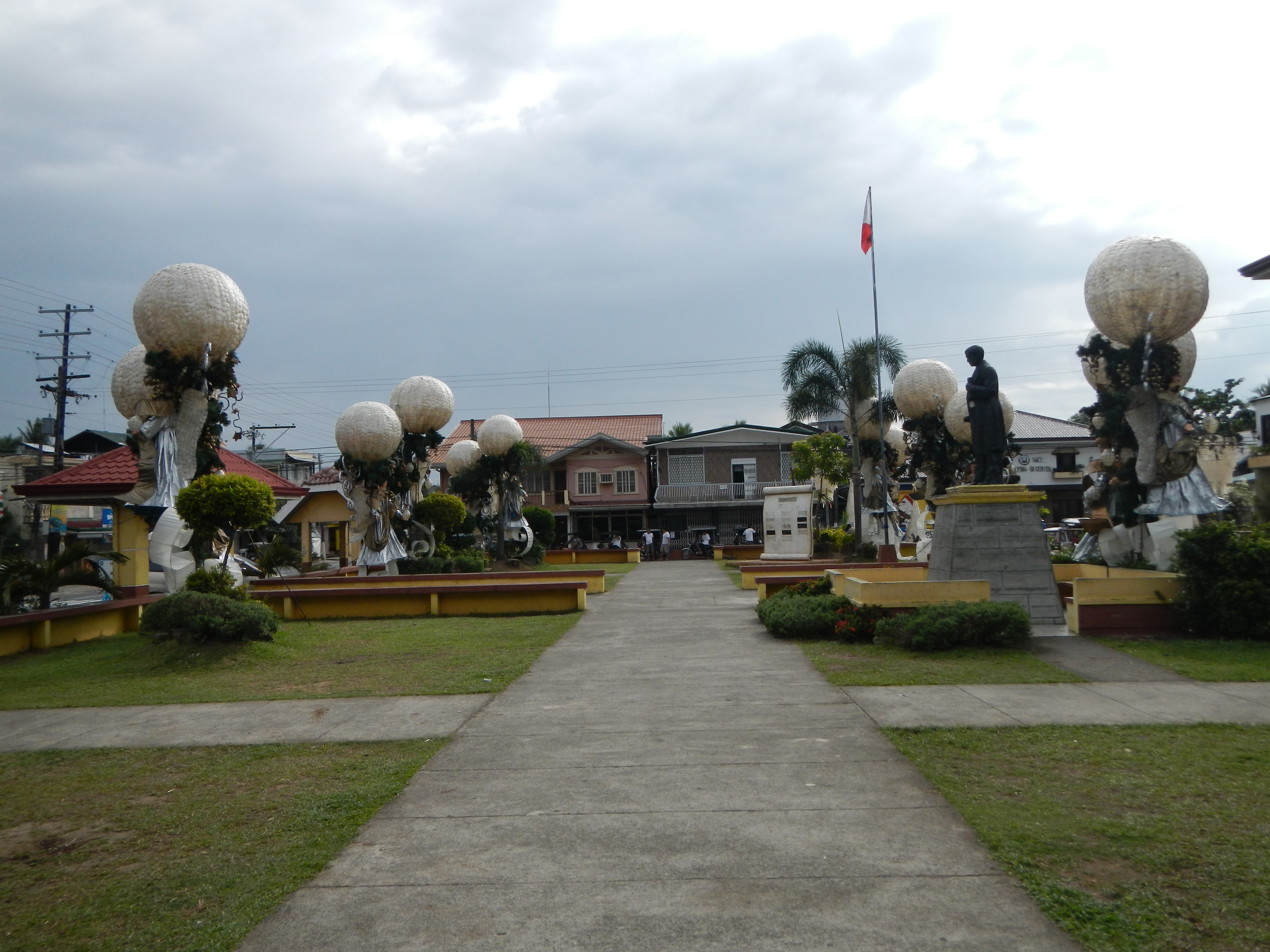
Jose Rizal Samal Park and Plaza

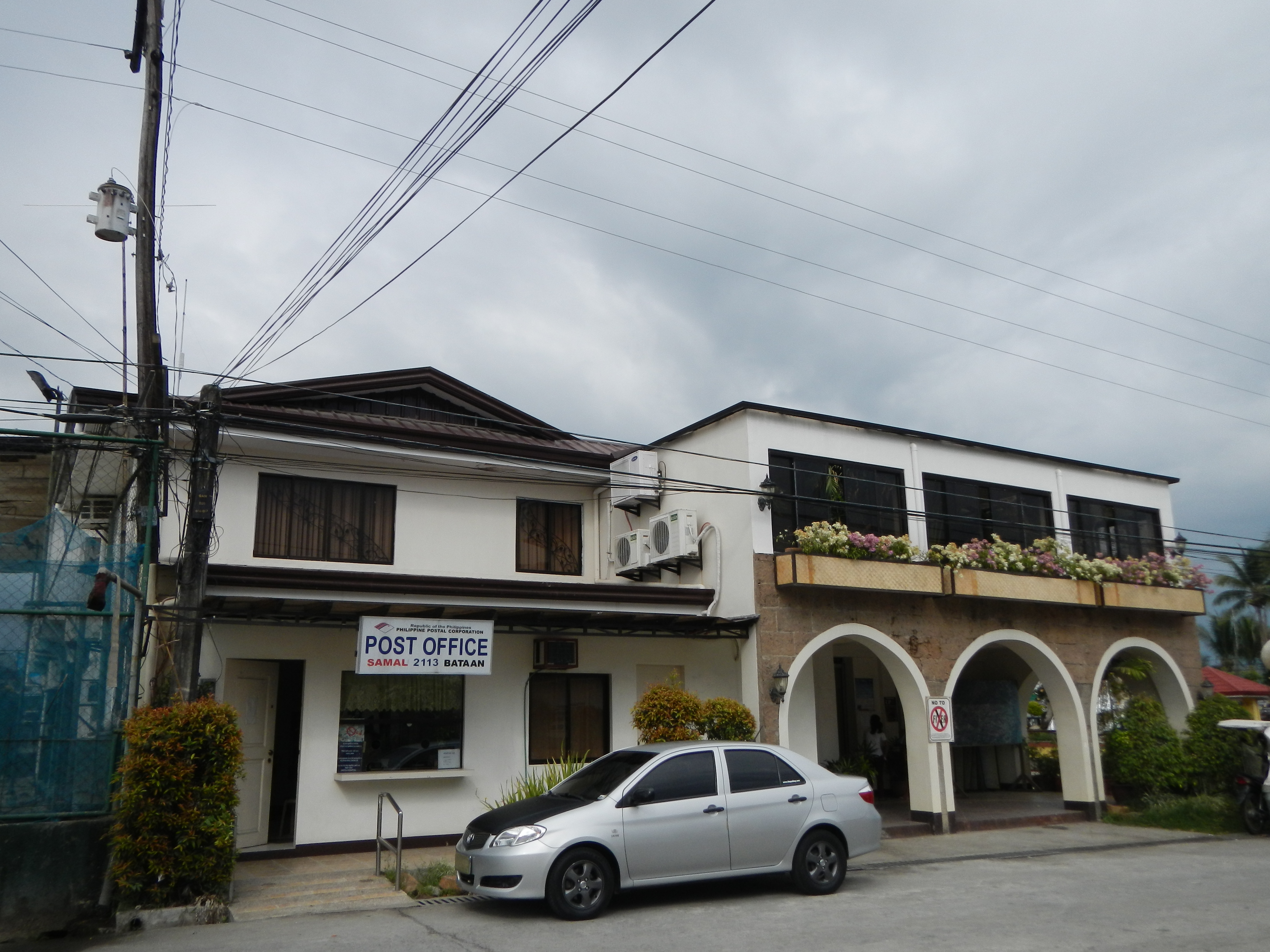
Post office, rear facade of Town hall

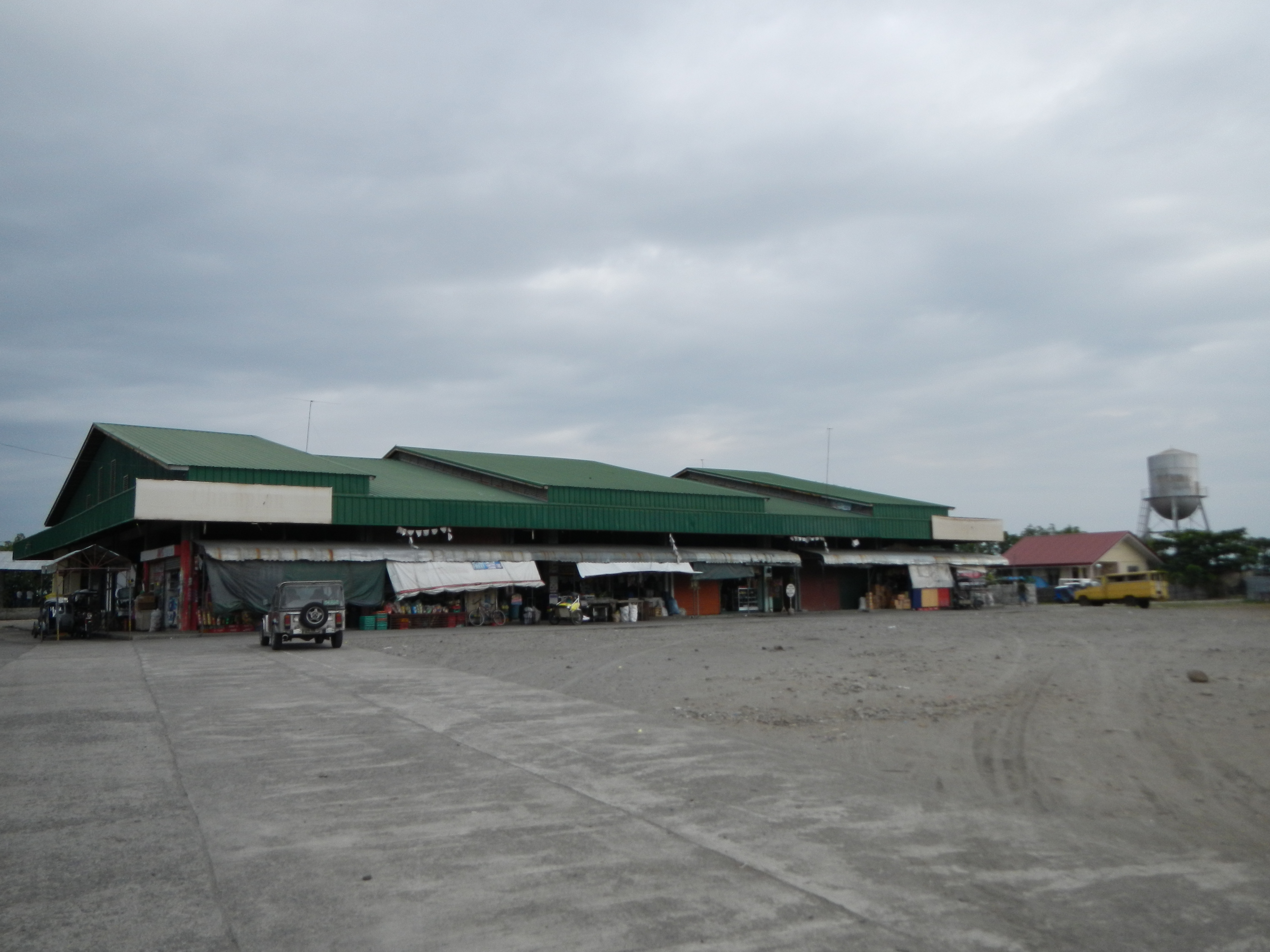
Public market

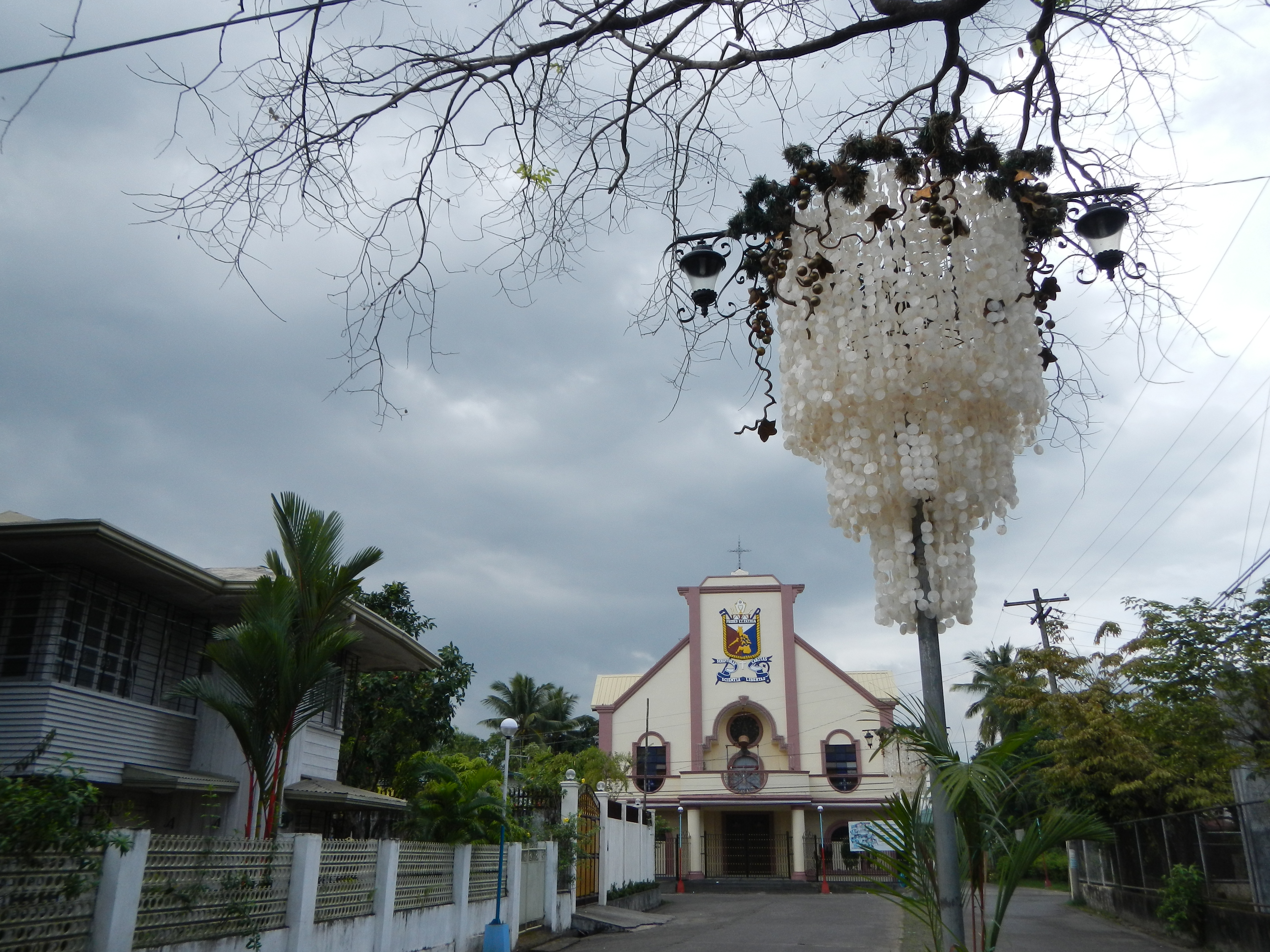
Capiz shells street lights surround downtown

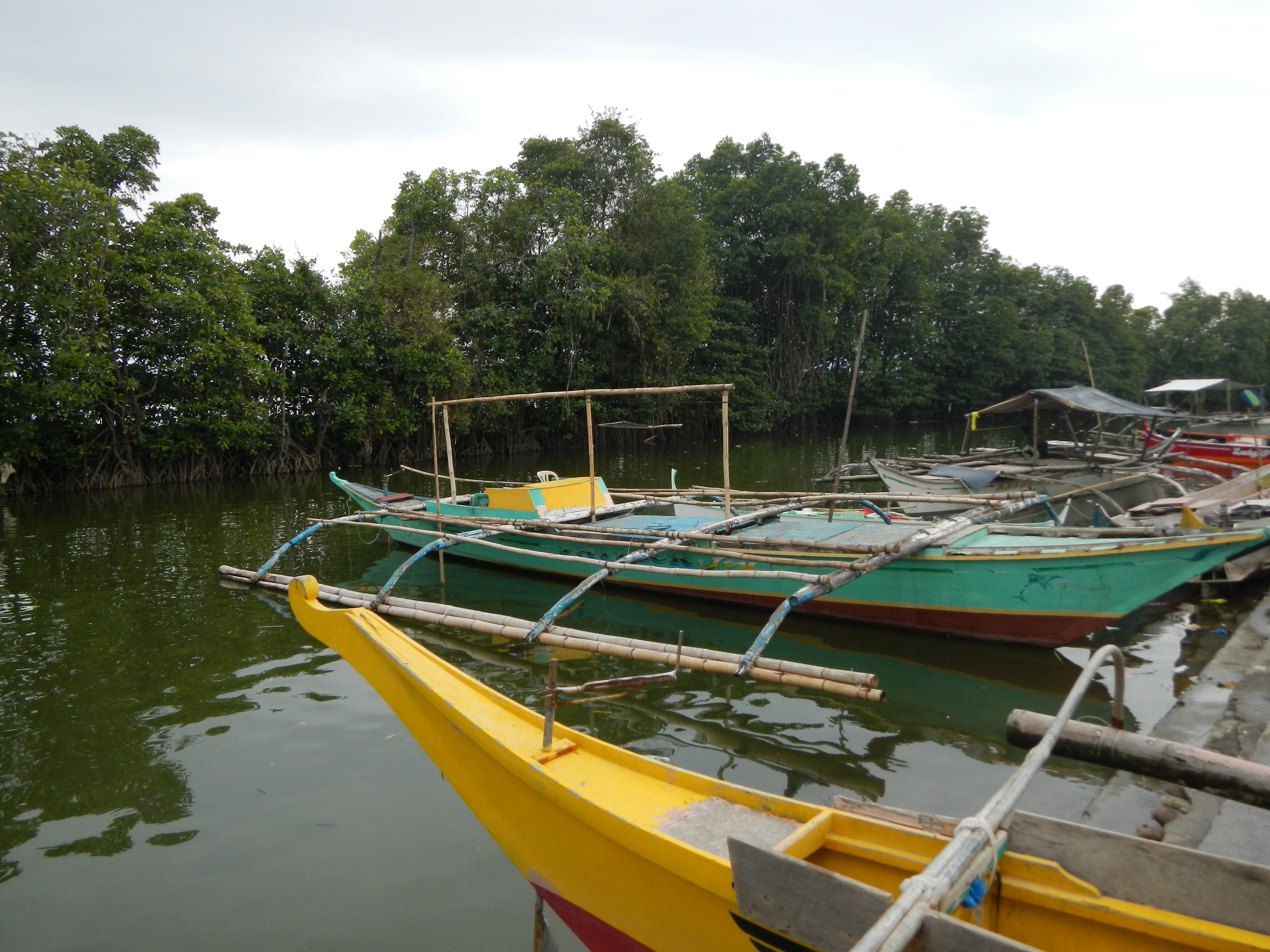
Banca transportation
