= Samal Church =

Roman Catholic church in Bataan, Philippines

- Saint Catherine of Siena Parish Church
- Parroquia de Santa Catalina de Siena de Samal (Spanish)
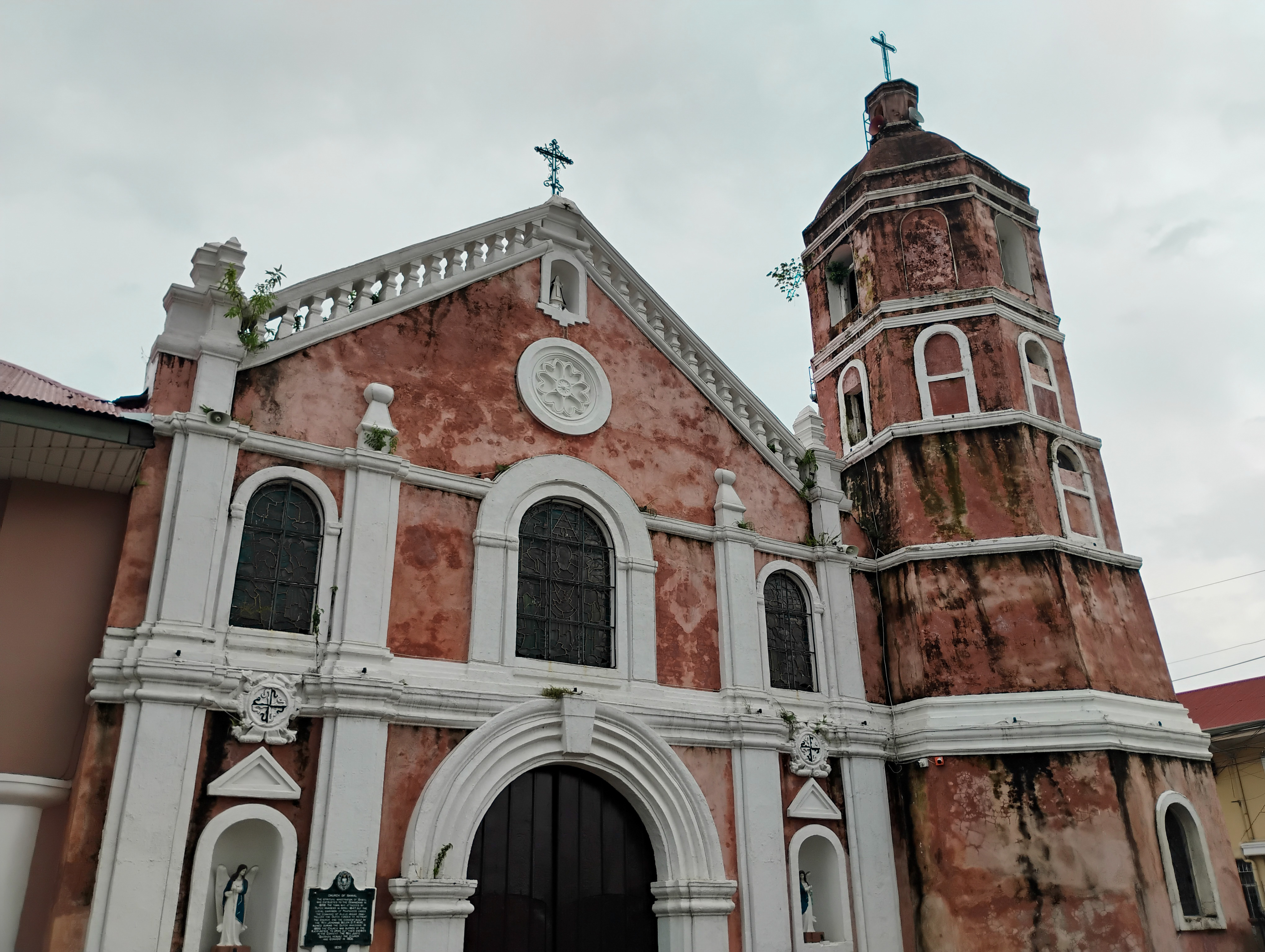
- Church facade in 2025

- Location in Luzon Location in the Philippines
- 14°46′12.5″N 120°32′30.0″E
- Location: Samal, Bataan
- Country: Philippines
- Denomination: Roman Catholic
- Website: Facebook page

History
- Status: Parish church
- Founded: 1596; 430 years ago
- Dedication: Catherine of Siena

Architecture
- Functional status: Active
- Heritage designation: National Historical Landmark
- Designated: 1939
- Architectural type: Church building

Administration
- Division: Vicariate of St. Dominic De Guzman
- Province: San Fernando
- Metropolis: San Fernando
- Archdiocese: San Fernando
- Diocese: Balanga

Clergy
- Archbishop: Florentino G. Lavarias
- Bishop: Rufino C. Sescon, Jr.
- Priest: Alwin B. Bobis

Saint Catherine of Siena Parish Church, commonly known as Samal Church, is a Roman Catholic church located in Samal, Bataan, Philippines. The church is dedicated to the Italian saint Catherine of Siena. The Dominicans constructed the first church in 1596. It is under the jurisdiction of the Diocese of Balanga.

From June 5, 2023 to December 26, 2025, Fr. Josue V. Enero was assigned as Rector and Parish Priest of the church until his death. Rufino Sescon, Bishop of Balanga, appointed Alwin B. Bobis as parish priest (originally as parish administrator) on January 19, 2026.

== History ==
The Dominicans in 1596 directed the spirituality of Samal. Attacked by Dutch invaders in April 1647, the local garrison of Pampanga under Alejo Aguas ousted the Dutch forces. Rev. Jeromino Belen, O.P. rebuilt the ruined church and the convent. In 1896, the Katipuneros burned the church and convent which were rebuilt by Rev. Justo Quesada in 1903.

The National Historical Commission of the Philippines declared the church as a national historical landmark in 1939.

== Gallery ==
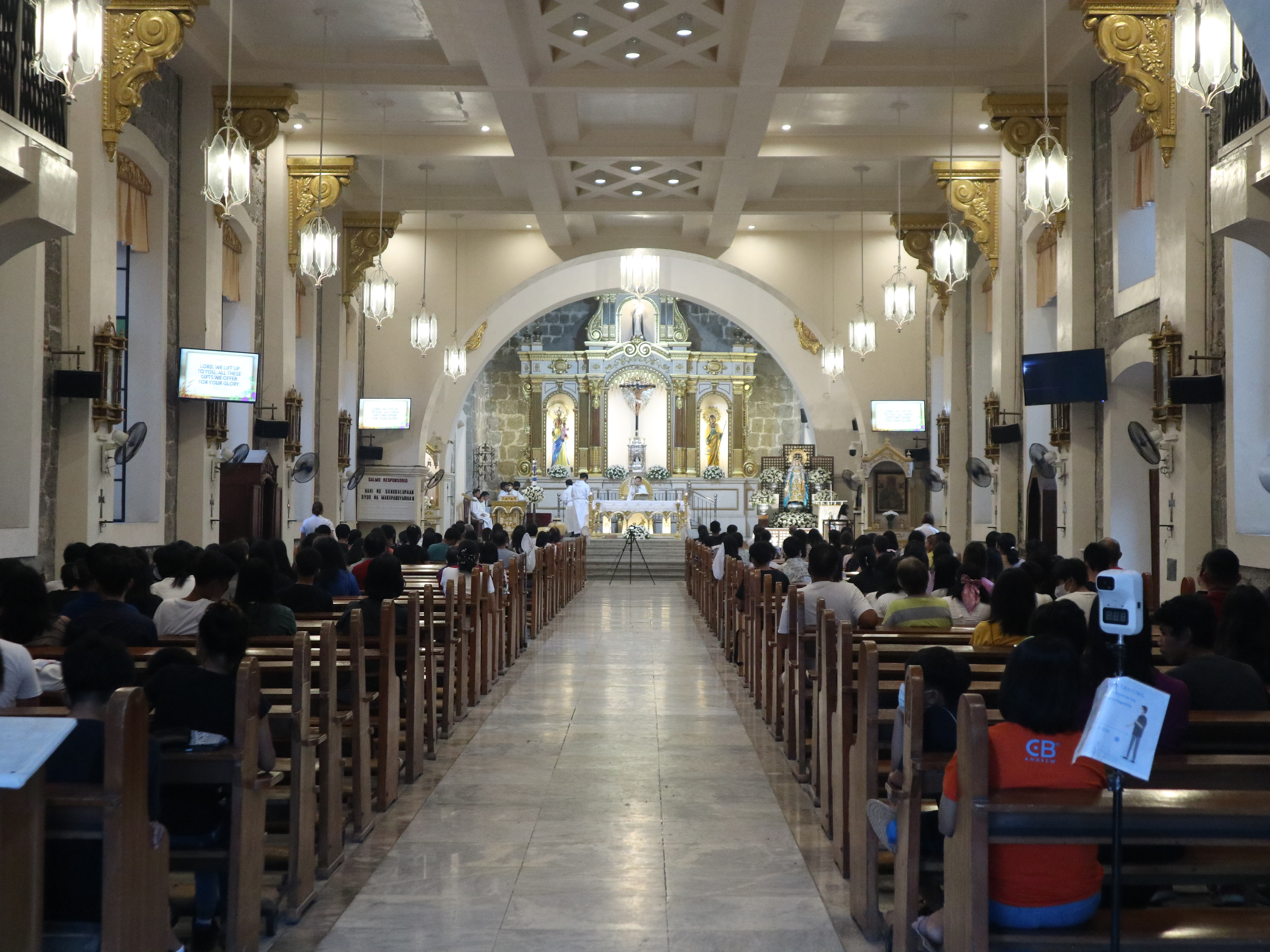
Church interior in 2023

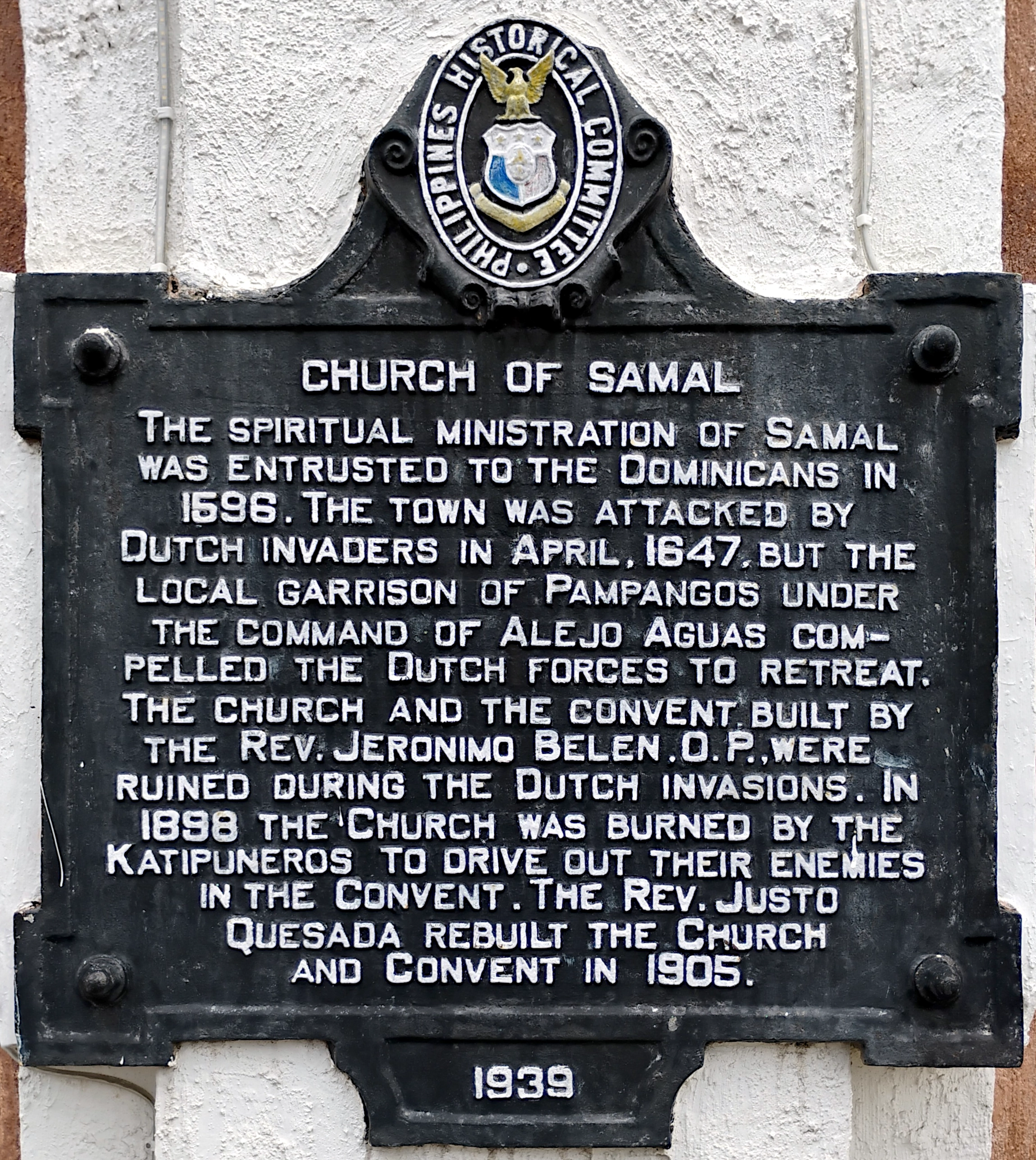
Church PHC historical marker installed in 1939

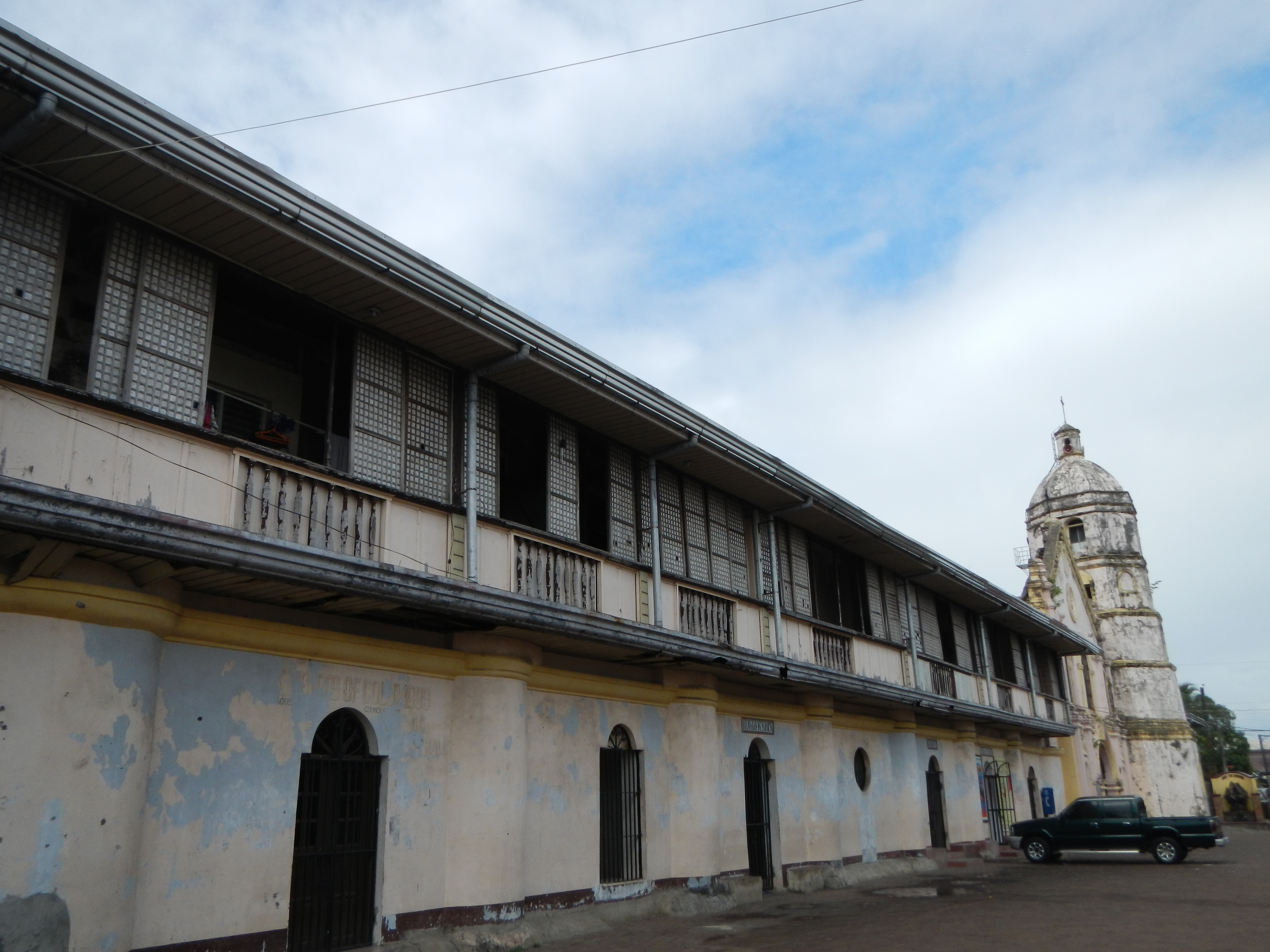
Convent
