= USS Talbot (DD-114) =

Wickes-class destroyer

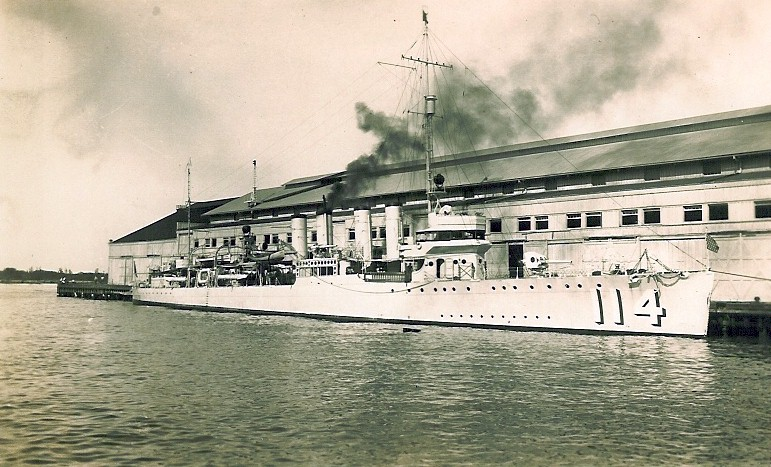
- USS Talbot alongside

History

United States
- Name: Talbot
- Namesake: Silas Talbot
- Builder: William Cramp & Sons, Philadelphia
- Yard number: 451
- Laid down: 12 July 1917
- Launched: 20 February 1918
- Commissioned: 20 July 1918
- Decommissioned: 31 March 1923
- Recommissioned: 31 May 1930
- Decommissioned: 9 October 1945
- Reclassified: high-speed transport (APD-7) 31 October 1942; destroyer (DD-114) 16 July 1945
- Stricken: 24 October 1945
- Fate: Sold for scrapping 30 January 1946

General characteristics
- Class & type: Wickes-class destroyer
- Displacement: 1,154 tons
- Length: 314 ft 4 in (95.8 m)
- Beam: 30 ft 11 in (9.4 m)
- Draft: 9 ft 10 in (3.0 m)
- Speed: 35 knots (65 km/h)
- Complement: 122 officers and enlisted
- Armament: 4 × 4 in (102 mm)/50 guns; 1 × 3 in (76 mm)/23 gun; 12 × 21 in (533 mm) torpedo tubes

USS Talbot (DD-114) was a Wickes-class destroyer in the United States Navy during World War I and later designated APD-7 in World War II. She was the first ship named in honor of Silas Talbot.

== Construction and commissioning ==
Talbot was laid down on 12 July 1917 at Philadelphia by William Cramp & Sons. The ship was launched on 20 February 1918, sponsored by Miss Elizabeth Major. The destroyer was commissioned on 20 July 1918, Lieutenant Commander Isaac Foote Dortch in command.

== Service history ==
Talbot stood out of New York on 31 July and steamed to the British Isles. She made three more round-trip voyages to England and, in December, called at Brest, France. In 1919, she joined the Pacific Fleet and operated with it until 31 March 1923 when she was decommissioned at San Diego. On 17 July 1920, the ship was designated DD-114 while in reserve.

Talbot was recommissioned on 31 May 1930, and joined Destroyer Squadron (DesRon) 10 of the Battle Force at San Diego. She remained with Battle Force until 1937 when she went to Hawaii to support Submarine Force, Pacific Fleet for a year. In 1939, she served with the Battle Force and the Submarine Force. In 1940 and 1941, the destroyer was based at San Diego.

=== World War II ===
The day after the Japanese attack on Pearl Harbor, Talbot got underway in the screen of the aircraft carrier Saratoga and headed for Hawaii. She arrived at Pearl Harbor exactly a week after the Japanese raid, patrolled off the islands for ten days, and returned to San Diego. In February 1942, the ship joined the Patrol Force of the 12th Naval District and escorted convoys along the Pacific coast.

Late in May, Talbot stood out of Puget Sound to escort the submarines S-18, S-23, and S-28 to Alaska. They arrived at Dutch Harbor on 2 June and were subjected to a small and unsuccessful air attack the next day. With the exception of three escort trips back to Seattle, the destroyer performed patrol and escort duty in Alaskan waters for the next seven months. On 31 October 1942, the ship was reclassified a high-speed transport and redesignated APD-7. Talbot departed Dutch Harbor on 31 January 1943 to be converted by the Mare Island Navy Yard into a small but fast troopship. The work, enabling Talbot to transport 147 combat troops, was completed on 15 March.

The next day, the high-speed transport got underway for Hawaii, and she arrived at Pearl Harbor the following week. On 2 April, she headed for Espiritu Santo to join Transport Division (TransDiv) 12. For two months, the APD participated in training exercises with her division and also escorted ships to New Caledonia, New Zealand, Australia, and Guadalcanal.

In mid-June, she joined Task Group (TG) 31.1, the Rendova Attack Group, for the invasion of New Georgia. She and Zane were to capture two small islands that controlled the entrance to Roviana Lagoon from Blanche Channel. The two ships embarked troops of the 169th Infantry Regiment at Guadalcanal, and, on 30 June, they were off their assigned beaches when the assault began. Heavy rains obscured the islands, and Zane ran aground at 0230. After landing her troops and supplies without opposition, Talbot attempted to pull the minesweeper free but failed. Then, Rail arrived and pulled Zane free while Talbot provided air protection. During the operation, enemy aircraft could be seen attacking the main landing force. On the night of 4 July, the ship and six other high speed transports arrived off Rice Anchorage. During the landing of assault troops the next morning, a Japanese "long-lance" torpedo sank Strong, one of the destroyers of the bombardment group.

Talbot returned to Guadalcanal to prepare for the occupation of Vella Lavella. On 14 August, she sortied with TG 31.5, the Advance Transport Group of the Northern Landing Force. The assault forces went ashore from the destroyer transports the next morning, unopposed. However, two hours later, the Japanese began air attacks against the ships and kept up the raids throughout the day. Nevertheless, the American fleet suffered no damage and claimed to have shot down 44 of the enemy planes.

The high-speed transport next devoted over a month to escorting smaller ships and carrying supplies to various islands in the Solomons. Late in September, she joined Admiral George H. Fort's Southern Attack Force for the conquest of the Treasury Islands. Eight APDs and 23 smaller landing ships were loaded with troops of the 8th New Zealand Brigade Force. The smaller ships departed Guadalcanal on 23 October and 24 October, and the faster destroyer transports left on 26 October. The following day, the troops landed on Mono and Stirling islands, and the transports had cleared the area by 2000.

On 3 November, Talbot called at Noumea to embark reinforcements for troops who, two days before, had landed on the beaches of Bougainville at Empress Augusta Bay. She arrived on 6 November, disembarked her soldiers, loaded 19 casualties and screened a group of landing ship tanks (LSTs) to Guadalcanal. On 11 November, she was back at the beachhead with a resupply echelon. Four days later, she got underway for Guadalcanal. The high-speed transport loaded troops, ammunition, and rations, held a practice landing, and headed for Bougainville. On 16 November, the destroyer transport and her five sister ships rendezvoused with a group of LSTs and destroyers. At 0300, a Japanese snooper aircraft dropped a flare astern of the convoy. It was followed by enemy bombers which attacked for almost an hour before hitting McKean and setting her afire. Although under constant air attack, Talbot's boats rescued 68 crew members and 106 marine passengers from the stricken ship.

Talbot continued to Cape Torokina and arrived there in the midst of another air attack. She landed her troops and headed for Guadalcanal.

After her engines were overhauled at Nouméa in December, the ship made a round-trip to Sydney. On 8 January 1944, she departed New Caledonia for Espiritu Santo to pick up a convoy and escort it to Guadalcanal. She arrived off Lunga Point on 13 January and patrolled between there and Koli Point for two weeks. On 28 January, the fast transport embarked elements of the 30th New Zealand Battalion and a group of intelligence and communications specialists of the United States Navy and headed for the Green Islands to participate in a reconnaissance in force.

On the night of 30 January, the destroyer transports landed the raiding party, withdrew from the area, and returned the next night to pick them up. Talbot disembarked the New Zealanders at Vella Lavella and the Navy men at Guadalcanal. On 13 February, Talbot reembarked New Zealand troops and sortied with TF 31, the Green Islands Attack Group. She was off Bara-hun Island on 15 February and launched her part of the assault wave. She then shuttled reinforcements and supplies from Guadalcanal to the Green Islands.

On 17 March, the transport loaded elements of the 2d Battalion, 4th Marines, at Guadalcanal and sailed with the amphibious force to the St. Matthias Islands. The Marines peacefully occupied Emirau on 20 March, and Talbot returned to Purvis Bay. She headed to New Guinea on 4 April to participate in practice landings with the 168nd Army Regimental Combat Team (RCT). Two weeks later, she loaded 145 men of that regiment and sortied with TG 77.3, the Fire Support Group, for the assault on Aitape. On 22 April, Talbot landed her troops, shelled Tumleo Island, and returned to Cape Cretin. She escorted resupply echelons to the landing area until 10 May when the transports were released by the 7th Fleet.

Talbot joined the 5th Fleet at Guadalcanal on 13 May and began training with underwater demolition teams. On 4 June, she joined a convoy to the Marshalls and arrived at Kwajalein on 8 June. Two days later, the high-speed transport joined TG 53.15 of the Southern Attack Force and got underway for the Marianas. However, she collided with the battleship Pennsylvania during an emergency turn; the resulting flooding of several of her compartments forced her to return for repairs. Talbot got underway two days later, rejoined the group southeast of Saipan, and was off the beaches there on 15 June, D-Day. During the first days of the operation, she screened the bombardment group. On 17 June, she captured a survivor of a wrecked Japanese boat. The ship developed engine trouble and anchored in the transport area where an enemy plane dropped a stick of bombs off her port bow, but caused no damage. She transferred her underwater demolition team to Kane and joined a convoy for Hawaii. She was then routed back to San Francisco for an overhaul that lasted from 11 July to 28 August.

Talbot returned to Pearl Harbor early in September and steamed onward to Eniwetok and Manus. She embarked Underwater Demolition Team No. 3 on 12 October and sortied with TG 77.6, the Bombardment and Fire Support Group, for Leyte. On 18 October, her swimmers made a daylight reconnaissance of the waters between San Jose and Dulag. Although opposed by enemy machine-gun and mortar fire, the team reembarked with no casualties. The transport departed with a convoy and arrived at Seeadler Harbor on 27 October, where she transferred the demolition team to President Hayes on the last day of the month.

Talbot headed toward Oro Bay, joined George Clymer, escorted her to Cape Gloucester, and returned to Seeadler Harbor on the 8th. Two days later, she was anchored there, only some 800 yards (732 m) from ammunition ship Mount Hood when it suddenly exploded and showered her with over 600 pounds (272 kg) of metal and debris. The transport was holed in several places and some crew members were injured. Talbot's boats searched for survivors but found none.

On 15 December 1944, after the high-speed transport's damage had been repaired at Manus, Talbot got underway and proceeded, via Aitape, to Noemfoor Island to participate in amphibious exercises with the 158th RCT. On 4 January 1945, she embarked troops and sortied with Task Unit 77.9.8 for Lingayen Gulf. The ship landed reinforcements at San Fabian the following week and continued on to Leyte. She embarked troops of the 11th Airborne Division on 26 January and headed for Luzon with a convoy. On 31 January, she disembarked the troops as the second wave against Nasugbu and steamed to Mindoro. She loaded mortar and rocket boats and delivered them to Leyte.

On 14 February, the high-speed transport embarked units of the 151st Infantry Regiment and steamed to Bataan. She landed the troops at Mariveles Bay the next morning and returned to Subic Bay. On 17 February, she took a load of reinforcements to Corregidor. The transport escorted a convoy back to Ulithi and remained there for several weeks before being ordered to Guam. Talbot and LSM-331 proceeded to Parece Vela to conduct a survey of the reef and determine the feasibility of erecting a radio, weather, and observation station there. She returned to Guam on 20 April and reached Ulithi the next day.

On 22 April, Talbot joined a convoy bound for Okinawa. Five days later, she began antisubmarine patrols south of Kerama Retto and then, on 30 April, joined a convoy for Saipan. She returned to Kerama Retto and served as a picket ship from 22 May to 6 June when she went back to Saipan. From the Marianas, the high speed transport was routed to Eniwetok, Hawaii, and the United States.

Talbot arrived at San Pedro on 6 July and was to be reconverted into a destroyer; her classification reverted to DD-114 on 16 July, but a Board of Inspection and Survey recommended that she be inactivated. Talbot was decommissioned on 9 October and struck from the Navy list on 24 October 1945. She was sold to the Boston Metals Company, Baltimore, Maryland, on 30 January 1946 and scrapped.

== Awards ==
Talbot received eight battle stars for World War II service.
