= USS Schley (DD-103) =

Wickes-class destroyer

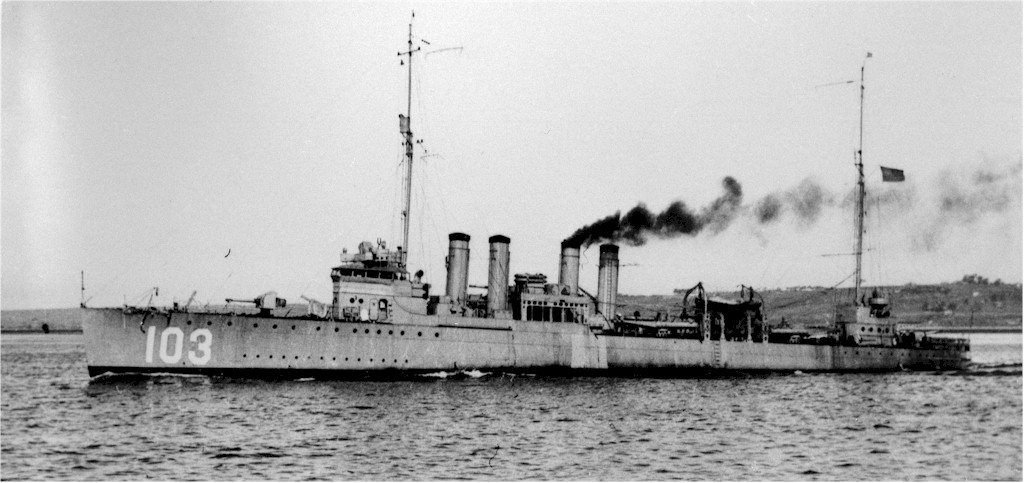
- USS Schley underway in the early 1920s

History

United States
- Name: Schley
- Namesake: Winfield Scott Schley
- Builder: Union Iron Works, San Francisco, California
- Laid down: 29 October 1917
- Launched: 28 March 1918
- Commissioned: 20 September 1918
- Decommissioned: 1 June 1922
- Identification: DD-103
- Recommissioned: 3 October 1940
- Decommissioned: 9 November 1945
- Reclassified: 6 February 1943, APD-14; 5 July 1945, DD-103
- Stricken: 5 December 1945
- Fate: Sold and broken up for scrap, 1946

General characteristics
- Class & type: Wickes-class destroyer
- Displacement: 1,185 tons
- Length: 314 ft 4 1/2 in (95.8 m)
- Beam: 30 ft 11 1/4 in (9.4 m)
- Draft: 9 ft 2 in (2.8 m)
- Speed: 35 knots (65 km/h)
- Complement: 133 officers and enlisted
- Armament: 4 × 4 in (102 mm) guns; 2 × 1-pounder gun; 12 × 21 in (533 mm) torpedo tubes

USS Schley (DD-103) was a Wickes-class destroyer in the United States Navy during World War I and later designated, APD-14 in World War II. She was the first ship named in honor of Winfield Scott Schley.

== Construction and commissioning ==
Schley was laid down on 29 October 1917 by Union Iron Works, San Francisco, California. The ship was launched on 28 March 1918, sponsored by Miss Eleanor Martin. The destroyer was commissioned on 20 September 1918, Commander Robert C. Giffen in command.

== Service history ==
=== World War I ===
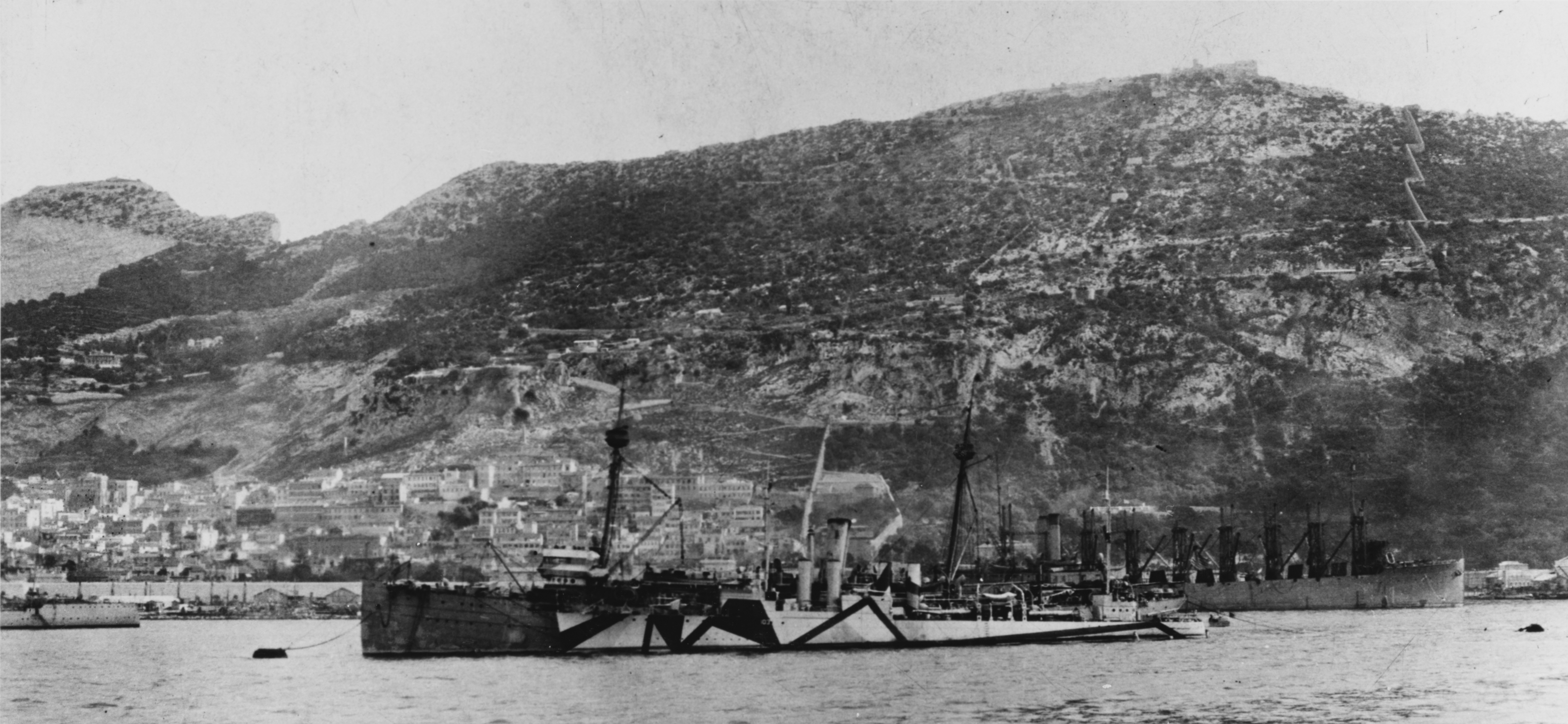
USS Schley (foreground), USS Buffalo, and USS Jupiter (background) in Gibraltar, December 1918

Schley sailed from San Diego on 10 October 1918 for the east coast and, on 12 November, departed New York for the Mediterranean Sea. On 24 January 1919 at Taranto, Italy, she embarked Rear Admiral Mark L. Bristol, Senior American Naval Officer in Turkey, and transported him to Constantinople. Schley next assumed duty in the Adriatic Sea, acting as station ship at Pola, Italy, from 17 February to 15 April, and then visiting Italian and Yugoslav ports on the Adriatic until heading for the United States on 2 July. Schley returned to San Diego on 8 September 1919 and, except for trips to San Francisco for repairs, remained there until she was placed out of commission, in reserve, on 1 June 1922.

=== World War II ===
With Europe again at war and war threatening in the Pacific Ocean, Schley was recommissioned at San Diego on 3 October 1940. She arrived at Pearl Harbor on 17 December for patrols and exercises there the next year. When Japanese planes attacked Pearl Harbor on 7 December 1941, the destroyer was moored in a nest of ships undergoing overhaul and, as her guns were dismantled, was able to do little besides reply with small arms fire. Her overhaul was rushed to completion; and, on 20 December, she took up a patrol station off the channel approaching Pearl Harbor. She operated there and off Honolulu for almost a year. On 13 December 1942, she departed Hawaiian waters for conversion into a fast transport at the Puget Sound Navy Yard. Schley was reclassified APD-14 effective 6 February 1943.

Schley returned to Pearl Harbor on 22 February and proceeded to the New Hebrides, arriving at Espiritu Santo on 27 March. In the South Pacific, she trained intensively with Marine raiders and other troops, acted as a patrol and escort vessel, and operated as a transport between the Solomons, the New Hebrides, American Samoa, and New Zealand.

Schley first participated in a landing under combat conditions on 30 June at New Georgia. With two other APDs and some smaller ships, she put troops ashore at Wickham Anchorage at the southwest end of Vangunu. On 5 July, she landed a second group of troops at Rice Anchorage, New Georgia. During this operation, a Japanese reinforcement group belatedly arrived on the scene and, in retiring, sank USS Strong with a long-range torpedo shot. After another trip to Rice Anchorage with supplies and ammunition, Schley sailed from Espiritu Santo on 1 August for overhaul at Mare Island.

==== 1944 ====
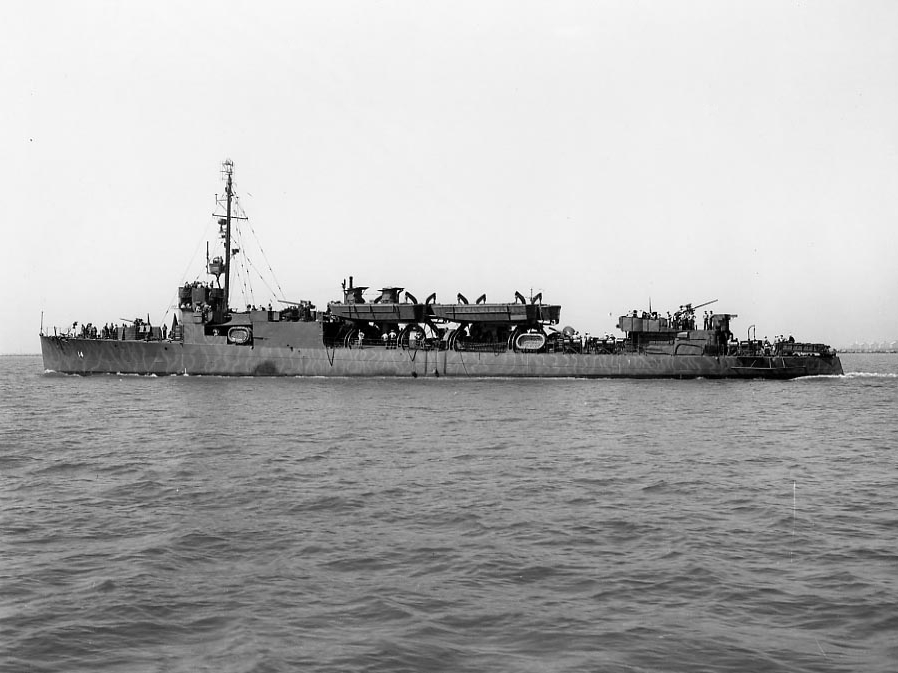
USS Schley off Mare Island, October 1943

Schley left the west coast for Pearl Harbor on 7 October, but engine repairs at Pearl Harbor took most of the rest of the year. On 30 December 1943, she arrived at San Diego to join the task force training for the invasion of the Marshall Islands. The force sailed from the west coast on 13 January 1944 and arrived off Kwajalein on 31 January. Schley landed her troops that day and then performed antisubmarine patrol duty until she reembarked her troops on 7 February.

She sailed for Eniwetok a week later. Her activities there showed the versatility of the small, fast transports. She arrived on 17 February and, that night, put her troops ashore on Bpgon Island to prevent enemy infiltration from Engebi, which American troops had invaded earlier in the day. The next morning, she began seizing the remaining islands west of the main island of Eniwetok. That day, her troops captured five islands and helped to secure Engebi and Bogon.

On 24 February, after transferring her troops to other transports, she got underway for Kwajalein to escort two transports from that atoll to her new area of operations, New Guinea.

Schley arrived off New Guinea on 12 March and conducted convoy operations for the next month. On 22 April, she participated in the landings at Aitape, putting troops ashore and providing gunfire support. The next day at Tumleo Island, her boats landed troops from a larger transport while Schley again provided gunfire support. After repairs to a damaged propeller, Schley landed a company of troops on Niroemoar Island to set up a radar unit on 19 May. The next day, she rescued the crew of a wrecked American gasoline barge off Wakde Island and then sank two Japanese barges and silenced an enemy shore battery. The busy ship landed troops on Biak on 27 May and at Cape Sansapor at the western end of New Guinea on 30 July. She then proceeded to Australia for repairs.

Schley next participated in two important preliminaries for the reconquest of the Philippines. She landed troops on Morotai on 9 September, and, on 17 October, formed part of the APD group that occupied the small islands at the mouth of Leyte Gulf, clearing the way for the invasion of Leyte three days later.

After a month of convoy operations, Schley joined the task group which carried out landings in Ormoc Bay on 7 December. The group came under intense kamikaze attack; although her sister ship, Ward, was sunk, Schley escaped damage. She then participated in the landings at Mindoro on 15 December 1944 and at Lingayen on 9 January 1945; and, during each operation, evaded an attacking kamikaze. At Mindoro, American planes shot down the kamikaze a scant thousand yards from Schley. At Lingayen, the kamikaze veered off at the last minute to attack another ship but missed. Schley remained on patrol off Lingayen until 18 January.

==== 1945–1946 ====
On 15 February, she landed troops at Mariveles Bay in order to cut off Japanese escape routes during the assault on Manila Bay and, two days later, put troops ashore under enemy fire on Corregidor, climaxing and completing her operations in the Philippines.

Schley departed Manila Bay on the 19th and left the Philippines for Ulithi on 25 February. She then escorted convoys in the western Pacific, and was briefly at Okinawa with one from 26 April to 28 April. On 29 May, Schley arrived at San Diego for repairs, and was redesignated DD-103 effective 5 July "for duty as rear-area escort and training vessel", as she was then too worn out for further front-line service. She was still under overhaul when the war ended, and after being made seaworthy, sailed on 17 September 1945 for inactivation at Philadelphia. Schley was decommissioned on 9 November 1945 and struck from the Navy list on 5 December 1945. Scrapping was completed by the Philadelphia Navy Yard on 29 March 1946.

== Awards ==
Schley received 11 battle stars for her duty in World War II.
