= Tumleo =

Tumleo may refer to:

- Tumleo Island in Sandaun Province, Papua New Guinea
- Tumleo language, an Austronesian language spoken in Papua New Guinea
