= Yakamul language =

Oceanic language spoken in Papua New Guinea

Yakamul
- Kap
- Region: Sandaun Province, Papua New Guinea
- Native speakers: 3,500 (2003)
- Language family: Austronesian: Malayo-Polynesian; Oceanic; Western; Schouten; Siau; Yakamul

Language codes
- ISO 639-3: ykm
- Glottolog: kapp1237
- ELP: Kap

Yakamul, also known as Kap or Ali, is an Austronesian language spoken in East Aitape Rural LLG, Sandaun Province, Papua New Guinea. It is spoken in the village of Yakamul (3.271334°S 142.676556°E) on the north coast and on the islands of Ali, Angel, and Seleo islands.

== Resources ==
- Klaffl, J., & Vormann, F. (1905). Die Sprachen des Berlinhafen-Bezirks in Deutsch-Neuguinea, Mitteilungen des Seminar für orientalische Sprachen zu Berlin, 8, 1-138.
