= Angel Island =

Angel Island may refer to:

- Angel Island (California), historic site of the United States Immigration Station, Angel Island, and part of Angel Island State Park, in San Francisco Bay, California
- Angel Island, Papua New Guinea
- Angel Island (novel), by Inez Haynes Gillmore
- Angel Island Zone, a fictional location in the Sonic the Hedgehog video game series.

== See also ==
- Angel Island–Tiburon Ferry
- Angel Island chuckwalla, endemic to Isla Ángel de la Guarda
- Angel Island mouse
- Island Angel, 1993 album by Altan
