= Aitape Airport =

Airport in Papua New Guinea

- IATA: ATP; ICAO: AYAI

Summary
- Location: Aitape, Papua New Guinea
- Elevation AMSL: 10 ft / 3 m
- Coordinates: 3°8.65′S 142°20.75′E

Map
- Location of airport in Papua New Guinea

Runways
Direction	Length		Surface
Direction	m	ft	Surface
16/34	844	2,769
- Source: PNG Airstrip Guide

Aitape Airport (IATA: ATP, ICAO: AYAI) is an airfield in Aitape, in the Sandaun Province of Papua New Guinea. There is another airstrip at Tadji about 10 km to the east, where most flights land.
