= Aitape =

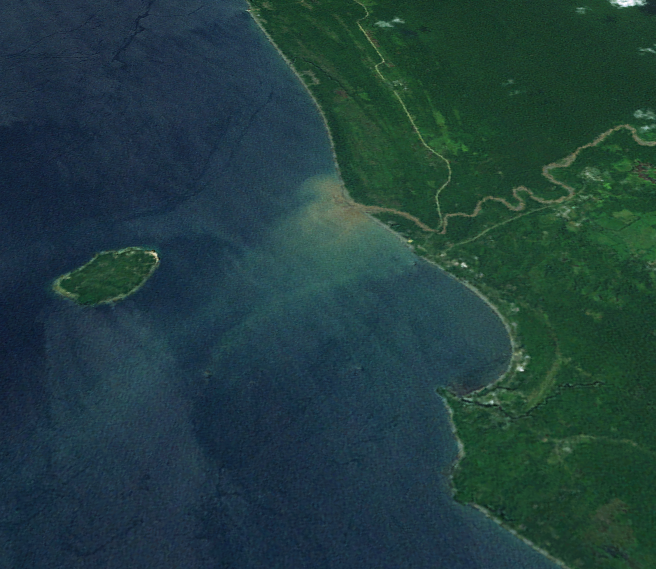
- Aitape (lower right) and Tumleo Island (left)

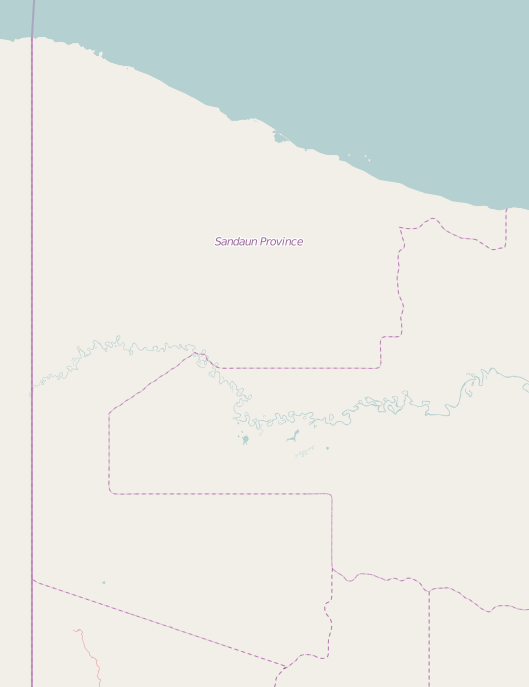
- Location within Sandaun Province Aitape (Papua New Guinea)
- Coordinates: 3°8′S 142°21′E
- Country: Papua New Guinea
- Province: Sandaun Province (West Sepik)
- LLG: East Aitape Rural LLG
- Established: 1905
- Elevation: 3.7 m (12 ft)

Population
  - Total: 18,000
  - Rank: 10th
- Time zone: UTC+10 (AEST)
- Location: 126 km (78 mi) ESE of Vanimo; 148 km (92 mi) WNW of Wewak
- Climate: Af

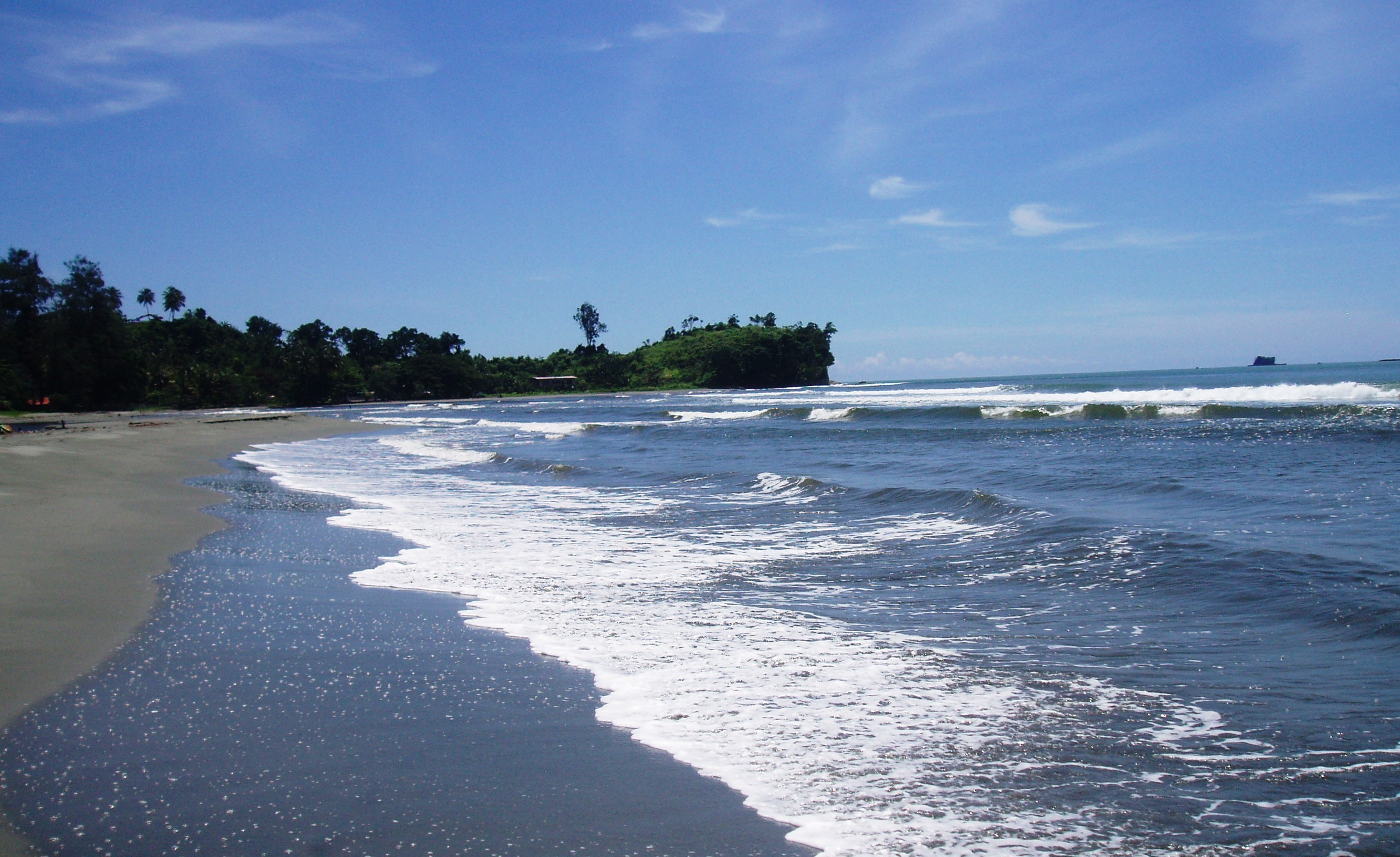
Aitape Beach

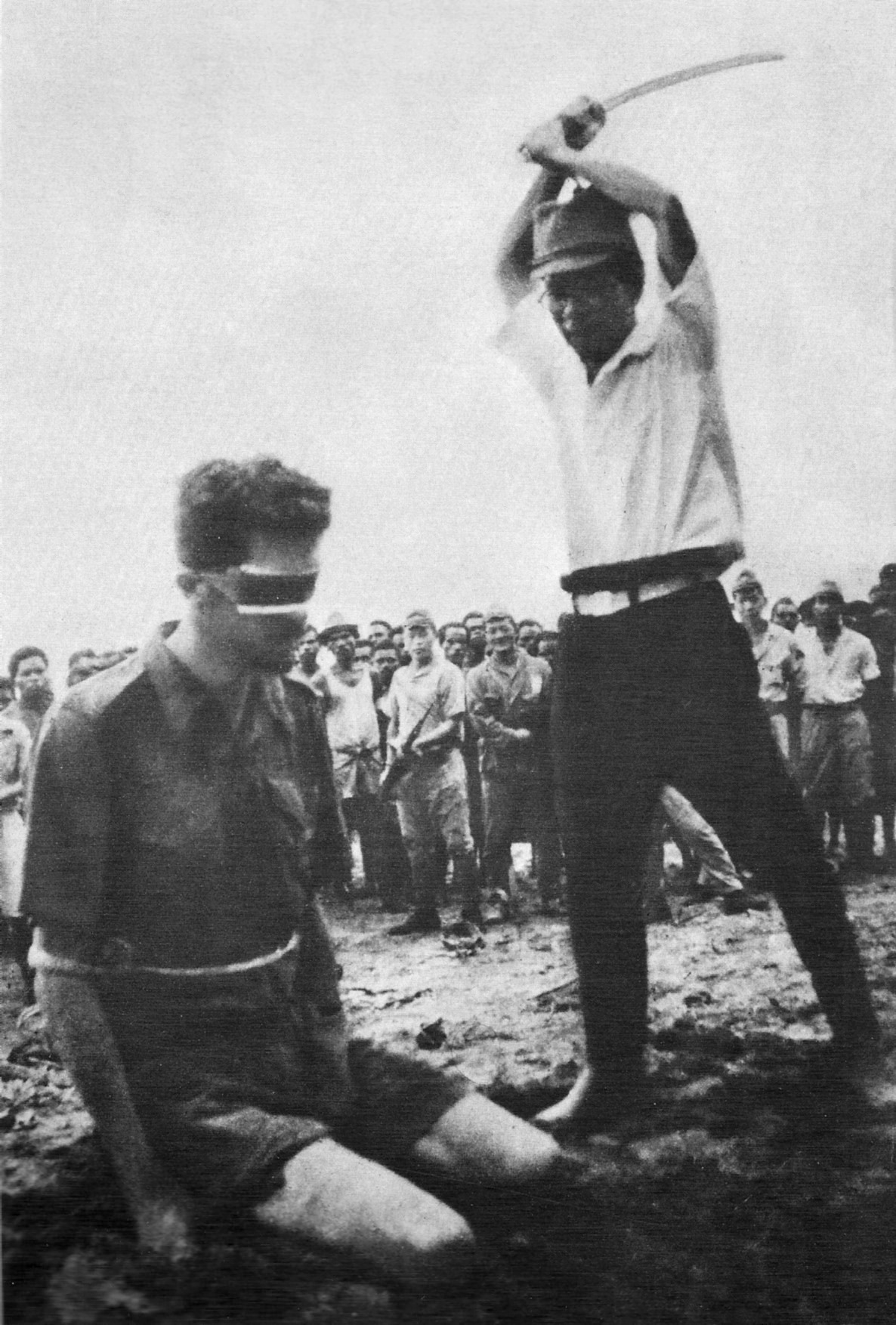
Sergeant Siffleet's execution at Aitape, 1943

Aitape is a small town of about 18,000 people on the north coast of Papua New Guinea in the Sandaun Province. It is a coastal settlement that is almost equidistant from the provincial capitals of Wewak and Vanimo. Aitape has 240 V power (in general 24 hours), telephone, a bank, a post-office, a courthouse and a police station, a supermarket and many tradestores, a petrol station, two airstrips, two secondary schools, a mission office and a hospital.

Aitape was established as a train station by German colonists in 1905 as part of German New Guinea. During the Second World War the town was occupied by the Imperial Japanese Army.

== Transport ==
Aitape can be reached by logging road from Wewak (180 km). The road that formerly linked Aitape to Vanimo has not been functional since at least 2017. Boats connect Aitape to Vanimo and Wewak.

There are two airstrips: Tadji (TAJ), where most flights land, and Aitape (ATP). Tadji airstrip is located 10 km east of town.

== History ==
First contact between the Aitape (Eitape) area and the outside world is believed to have occurred during the 15th century when large sailing expeditions arrived from China. It is certain that Malay fishing fleets were active along the Sepik coastline from the early 17th century when island inhabitants were recruited as navigators for these Malay fishing vessels. The first Christian missionary arrived in the Aitape area in 1896. It was Societatis Verbi Divini (the Society of the Divine Word or SVD) from Germany and Holland. The first mission station was established on Tumleo Island in 1896. A second station was set up at Pro on the mainland the following year. The inhabitants of Pro requested that the mission station be established to protect them from raids by much larger settlements. The major native settlements at the time were at Sissano, Malol, and Arop (the Siau group). The island settlements of Tumleo, Ali, and Seleo (the Bakla) made up the next group of main settlements. Both the Siau and Bakla would band together annually for major trading expeditions taking in the Aitape coastline to the south east areas around Wewak.

German authorities found it difficult to colonize the Siau and Bakla of the Aitape area. The Aitape area was officially described as uncontrolled during the German colonial period. Still, the Germans built a solid prison at Aitape and installed a powerful radio station which maintained quality communication with Europe.

In 1908, the Aitape coastline was struck by a major tsunami event resulting in the collapse of an area of coastline between Arop and Sissano creating the Sissano Lagoon. (A second tsunami struck in 1935 with most recent occurring in 1998 also hitting Sissano.)

By 1914 there were 68 missionaries and 6 new stations established along the coast. The town along with the rest of German New Guinea passed to Australian control after the First World War and became part of the Territory of New Guinea.

=== Second World War ===
During the Second World War the town was occupied, along with the rest of the Territory of New Guinea, by the Imperial Japanese Army.

During the recapture American forces bypassed the Japanese 18th Army based at Wewak, taking Aitape on 22 April 1944. A base was developed here and repulsed a major Japanese counter-attack. The Americans were content to hold Aitape and not advance far towards Wewak. In mid-1944, General Douglas MacArthur, the American Commander-in-Chief of Allied forces in the South-West Pacific Area, secured an agreement from the Australian government for Australian forces to take over at Aitape. MacArthur then continued island hopping in preparation for the re-capture of the Philippines.

The Aitape-Wewak campaign was the final Australian military campaign on mainland New Guinea. It ran from November 1944 to the war's end in August 1945. It was fought by the 6th Division, Australian Imperial Force (AIF) with air and naval support. The US Navy built a camp at Aitape as a remote post for Naval Base Hollandia.

Australian intelligence soldier Leonard Siffleet was beheaded by the Japanese on Aitape beach on 24 October 1943.

=== Tsunami ===
In July 1998, the area surrounding the town suffered from a destructive tsunami that killed over 2,000 people. A magnitude 7.0 earthquake occurred offshore and triggered a large undersea landslide that generated the tsunami. The area worst hit was Warapu village about 8 km west of Aitape. The village was situated on a narrow spit between the coast and a large lagoon. It is estimated that waves with an average height of 10.5 metres passed over the spit into the lagoon.

== Climate ==
Aitape has a tropical rainforest climate (Af) with heavy rainfall year-round.

Climate data for Aitape
Month	Jan	Feb	Mar	Apr	May	Jun	Jul	Aug	Sep	Oct	Nov	Dec	Year
Mean daily maximum °C (°F)	30.1 (86.2)	29.9 (85.8)	30.1 (86.2)	30.6 (87.1)	30.7 (87.3)	30.1 (86.2)	29.9 (85.8)	30.3 (86.5)	30.3 (86.5)	30.3 (86.5)	30.4 (86.7)	29.9 (85.8)	30.2 (86.4)
Daily mean °C (°F)	26.5 (79.7)	26.5 (79.7)	26.5 (79.7)	26.8 (80.2)	26.8 (80.2)	26.3 (79.3)	26.2 (79.2)	26.3 (79.3)	26.5 (79.7)	26.5 (79.7)	26.6 (79.9)	26.2 (79.2)	26.5 (79.7)
Mean daily minimum °C (°F)	23.0 (73.4)	23.1 (73.6)	23.0 (73.4)	23.1 (73.6)	23.0 (73.4)	22.5 (72.5)	22.5 (72.5)	22.4 (72.3)	22.7 (72.9)	22.8 (73.0)	22.9 (73.2)	22.6 (72.7)	22.8 (73.0)
Average precipitation mm (inches)	260 (10.2)	262 (10.3)	289 (11.4)	236 (9.3)	199 (7.8)	188 (7.4)	173 (6.8)	130 (5.1)	161 (6.3)	179 (7.0)	205 (8.1)	281 (11.1)	2,563 (100.8)
Source: Climate-Data.org

== See also ==
- East Aitape Rural LLG, which includes Aitape Urban Ward
- West Aitape Rural LLG
