= Tumleo language =

Austronesian language

Tumleo
- Native to: Papua New Guinea
- Region: Tumleo Island (in East Aitape Rural LLG, Sandaun Province)
- Native speakers: 790 (2003)
- Language family: Austronesian: Malayo-Polynesian; Oceanic; Western; Schouten; Siau; Tumleo

Language codes
- ISO 639-3: tmq
- Glottolog: tuml1238
- ELP: Tumleo
- Coordinates: 3.126188°S 142.398558°E

Tumleo is an Austronesian language of coastal Sandaun Province, Papua New Guinea, on Tumleo Island (3.126188°S 142.398558°E) and the Aitape coast in East Aitape Rural LLG.
