= USS Kane (DD-235) =

Clemson-class destroyer

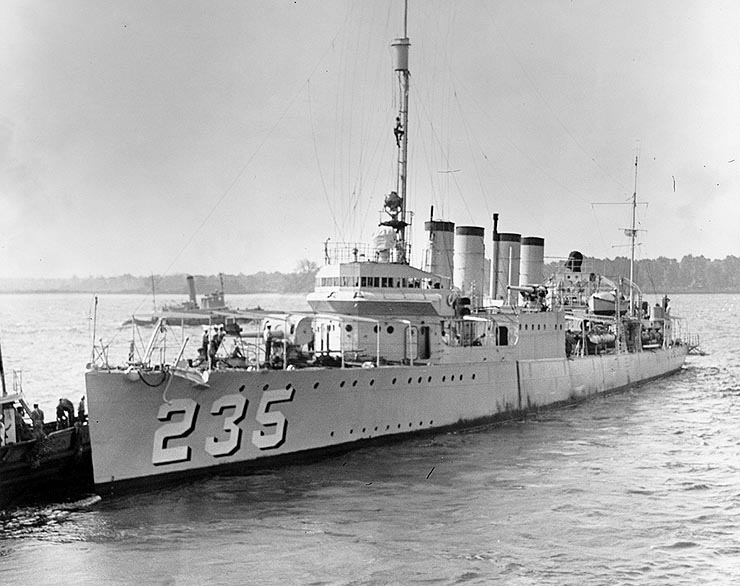
- USS Kane (DD-235)

History

United States
- Namesake: Elisha Kent Kane
- Builder: New York Shipbuilding
- Laid down: 3 July 1918
- Launched: 12 August 1919
- Commissioned: 11 June 1920
- Decommissioned: 31 December 1930
- Recommissioned: 1 April 1932
- Decommissioned: 28 April 1938
- Recommissioned: 23 September 1939
- Reclassified: High-speed transport, APD-18, 25 March 1943
- Decommissioned: 24 January 1946
- Stricken: 25 February 1946
- Honors and awards: Seven battle stars for World War II
- Fate: Sold for scrap 21 June 1946

General characteristics
- Class & type: Variant of Clemson-class destroyer
- Displacement: 1,215 tons
- Length: 314 feet 5 inches (95.83 m)
- Beam: 31 feet 8 inches (9.65 m)
- Draft: 9 feet 4 inches (2.84 m)
- Propulsion: 26,500 shp (20 MW); geared turbines, 2 screws
- Speed: 35 knots (65 km/h)
- Range: 4,900 nm @ 15 kn (9,100 km @ 28 km/h)
- Complement: 101 officers and enlisted
- Armament: 4 x 5 in (130 mm) guns, 1 x 3 in (76 mm) gun, 2 x .30 cal (7.62 mm), 12 x 21 inch (533 mm) tt.

USS Kane (DD-235/APD-18) was a Clemson-class destroyer in the United States Navy during World War II. She was the first ship named for Elisha Kent Kane.

== Construction and commissioning ==
Kane was laid down on 3 July 1918 and launched on 12 August 1919 by the New York Shipbuilding Corporation; sponsored by Miss Florence Kane, cousin of Elisha Kent Kane; and commissioned on 11 June 1920.

== Service history ==
Kane departed Newport, Rhode Island 20 August 1920 for her shakedown cruise to Gibraltar, Brest, Copenhagen, Danzig, and the Gulf of Riga. She was just outside the Gulf in the Baltic Sea on 1 October 1920 and supposedly well clear of the minefields laid in World War I when a mine exploded, bending her port engine shafts and port propeller struts. After repair at Landskrona, Sweden, and overhaul at Chatham, England, she sailed on 21 May 1921 for the Mediterranean.

On 22 June 1921, Kane rescued an Italian torpedo boat drifting upon the rocks off Cape Spartivento. On 3 July, she reached Constantinople for relief work in Turkish waters. She returned to Newport on 23 August. She sailed on 2 October with Destroyer Squadron 14 to evacuate refugees and perform other relief work in Asia Minor. She arrived in Constantinople on 22 October and was constantly used to carry supplies, medical aid, refugees, and relief officials between ports of the Black Sea and the Eastern Mediterranean. She departed Constantinople on 18 May 1923 and spent the next five years with the Scouting Fleet operating along the United States East Coast and in the Caribbean. She departed New York on 13 February 1925 for a fleet training cruise to San Diego, California, and from there she sailed to Pearl Harbor and returned on 17 July. In the spring of 1927, the destroyer patrolled off bandit-plagued Nicaragua and the Honduras. She decommissioned in the Philadelphia Navy Yard 31 December 1930.

Kane recommissioned on 1 April 1932, and departed Philadelphia on 29 June for San Diego, her base for the next four years. She got underway from San Diego on 27 April 1936 for fleet exercises in the Caribbean before entering the New York Navy Yard to prepare for special service.

Kane departed New York on 17 August 1936 for Spain to evacuate American citizens whose lives were endangered by the civil war in Spain. On 30 August, en route to Bilbao, she had to open fire three times to drive off a tri-motored monoplane dropping bombs within a hundred yards of the destroyer. A strong protest against both Spanish Civil War factions was made, and this forestalled similar incidents. She called at Bilbao and Gijón, embarking refugees who were taken to St. Jean de Luz, France.

Raleigh arrived at Gibraltar on 27 September 1936 as the flagship of Squadron Forty-T commanded by Rear Admiral Arthur P. Fairfield. This special squadron, initially comprising Raleigh, Kane, Hatfield and USCGC Cayuga, saved hundreds of American and other nationals from the dangers of the war in Spain. Kane and Hatfield were relieved by Claxton and Manley 9 November 1937 and sailed for home. Kane entered the Charleston Navy Yard 22 November, and decommissioned 28 April 1938.

=== World War II ===
Kane recommissioned 23 September 1939 to serve in the Neutrality Patrol in the North Atlantic. On 7 August she took up inshore defensive patrol along both coastlines of Panama. She then steamed to San Diego, arriving on 4 November 1940, to patrol off the coast of California. She overhauled in the Puget Sound Naval Shipyard from 4 January to 3 March 1941, she was based in Seattle for patrols north to Alaska, and along the United States West Coast. After the Japanese struck Pearl Harbor, she departed Seattle, Washington for Kodiak, Alaska, and escorted troop transports back to Seattle on 23 December. Following a similar escort voyage, she arrived at Seward on 19 April 1942 for inter-island convoy and submarine patrols among Alaskan ports.

On 11 June, Kane rescued 11 survivors of the torpedoed USAT Arcata. On the morning of 3 August 1942, she found her antiaircraft guns of little use against two attacks by high-altitude Japanese bombers. Evasion tactics and speed saved the destroyer from bombs that fell in her wake. She continued to patrol and escort duty in Alaskan and Aleutian sectors until February 1942, then was converted to a high-speed transport by Todd's Dry Docks, Seattle, Washington, and reclassified APD-18 on 25 March 1943. Conversion was completed by 3 April 1943, when she departed for amphibious training with the Army's 7th infantry in Monterey Bay, California.

Kane departed San Francisco on 24 April and arrived in Cold Bay on 30 April to prepare for the recapture of Attu, Aleutian Islands. The morning of 11 May, Narwhal and Nautilus landed 100 Army scouts northwest of Holtz Bay. Several hours later, Kane was coached in through very dense fog by Pennsylvania's radar to land 400 reconnaissance troops, who then joined the scouts.

During the ground fighting on Attu, Kane served as evacuation hospital transport and shuttled medical supplies between Holtz and Massacre Bay. Off the entrance to Dutch Harbor on 17 July, she received 12 survivors of the Russian Seiner No. 2. Following amphibious exercises off Amchitka Island, she landed elements of the Army's 1st Special Service Force on Kiska 14 August and later on Little Kiska Island. But the Japanese had evacuated under cover of fog, leaving a few mongrel dogs as sole inhabitants. This marked the end of the last Japanese hold on the Aleutians. Kane remained on duty between Alaskan and Aleutian ports until 20 November 1943, then steamed south for an overhaul in the Mare Island Navy Yard until 7 January 1944.

Kane arrived in Pearl Harbor 18 January 1944 to join the 5th Amphibious Force for the capture of the Marshall Islands. Her Marine escort secured the channel islets at the entrance of Majuro Lagoon on the night of 30 to 31 January 1944 and later took the islands on the east side of Kwajalein Lagoon. She sailed on 25 February to help screen amphibious landing ships for the invasion of Milne Bay, New Guinea, then entered Seeadler Harbor, Manus, as the 7th Cavalry Regiment took the remaining strong point in the Admiralty Islands. The high-speed transport landed men of the 163d Infantry at Aitape on 22 April 1944 and bombarded enemy positions before withdrawing to shell Ali Island. After escorting a convoy to the Solomon Islands she returned to Pearl Harbor on 23 May 1944.

After training out of Pearl Harbor and preparations at Eniwetok, Kane landed Marines for the invasion of Saipan on 15 June 1944. After the fast carriers of the 5th Fleet destroyed Japan's carrier-based airpower in the Battle of the Philippine Sea, the transport supported Underwater Demolition Team 4 in operations off Saipan. On 23 June, she dodged an aerial bomb that sprayed her with shrapnel and wounded three men. She replenished at Eniwetok, then entered Agat Bay, Guam, the afternoon of 17 July. The Japanese had planted three lines of palm-log cribs filled with coral rocks, linked each to the other by wire cables as anti-ship defences. Her "naked warriors" of Underwater Demolition Team 4, assisted by other teams, blew up hundreds of these obstacles, clearing the way for the Marines, who landed on 21 July 1944. On 24 July, as the frogmen worked into the night, the Japanese mortar fire in Agat Bay barely missed Kane. She returned to Pearl Harbor on 10 August 1944 but entered Leyte Gulf on 18 October carrying 100 tons of demolition explosives to be used in clearing the way for the Leyte Invasion landings 2 days later. She carried her demolition teams to the Admiralty Islands, then set course for home and an overhaul arriving San Pedro, California, 4 December.

Kane departed San Diego on 20 April 1945 to train Underwater Demolition Team 24 in Hawaiian waters until 4 May, then arrived off Kerama Retto on 12 June. After escorting Solace out of the combat zone, she patrolled the southwest anchorage of Ilinawa and fought off two kamikazes 21 June. A week later she sailed with a convoy bound for Leyte. She became a unit of the Philippine Sea Frontier on 4 July and patrolled the shipping lanes leading eastward guarding against submarines until the end of hostilities.

Kane departed San Pedro Bay, Leyte, 13 September escorting occupation troops to Korea, arriving Jinsen 17 September. Thereafter, she became an unofficial receiving ship and handled communications for the Jinsen representative of the 7th Amphibious Force. Relieved on 12 November 1945, she headed for home and arrived in San Diego on 13 December 1945.

After sending 149 Navy veterans ashore, she transited the Panama Canal for the Philadelphia Navy Yard, where she decommissioned 24 January 1946. She was sold for scrapping on 21 June 1946 to Northern Metals Company, Philadelphia.

== Awards ==
Kane received seven battle stars for service in World War II.
