= Mariveles Mental Wellness and General Hospital =

Government hospital in Bataan, Philippines

Geography
- Location: Mariveles, Bataan, Central Luzon, Philippines
- Coordinates: 14°25′49″N 120°29′02″E

Organization
- Funding: Government hospital

Links
- Website: mmwgh.gov.ph

The Mariveles Mental Wellness and General Hospital is a custodial psychiatric care government hospital in the Philippines. It is located along P. Monroe Street Poblacion, Mariveles, Bataan.
