= Seleo Island =

Island in Papua New Guinea

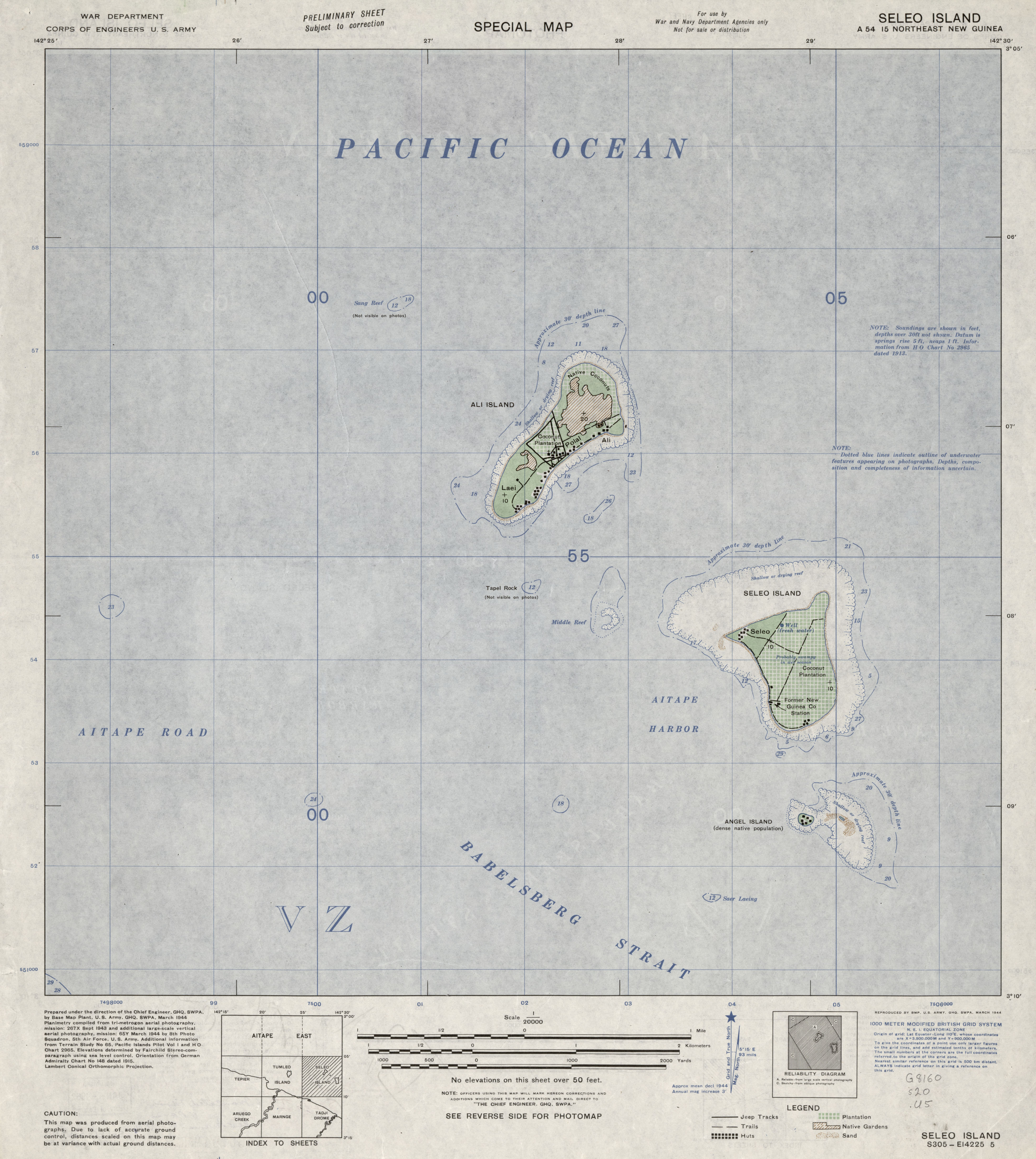
- Seleo Island in the lower right

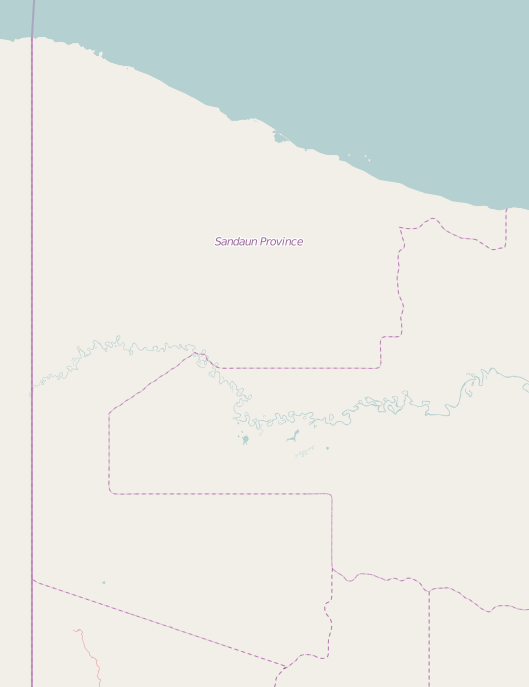
- Location within Sandaun Province Location within Papua New Guinea

Geography
- Location: Oceania
- Coordinates: 3.143836°S 142.482826°E

Administration
- Papua New Guinea
- Province: Sandaun Province
- LLG: East Aitape Rural LLG

Seleo Island is a populated island in East Aitape Rural LLG, Sandaun Province, Papua New Guinea.

The Yakamul language is spoken on the island.
