= Angel Island, Papua New Guinea =

Island in Papua New Guinea

Angel Island
- Location within Papua New Guinea

Geography
- Location: Oceania
- Coordinates: 3.150572°S 142.482418°E

Administration
- Papua New Guinea

Angel Island is a populated island in East Aitape Rural LLG, Sandaun Province, Papua New Guinea.

The Yakamul language is spoken on the island.
