= East Aitape Rural LLG =

Local-level government in Papua New Guinea

- Location within Papua New Guinea
- Coordinates: 3.141705°S 142.349762°E
- Country: Papua New Guinea
- Province: Sandaun Province
- Time zone: UTC+10 (AEST)

East Aitape Rural LLG is a local-level government (LLG) of Sandaun Province, Papua New Guinea. Arapesh and Schouten languages are spoken in this LLG.

== Wards ==
- 03. Poltulul
- 04. Tales-Iambu
- 05. Tumeleo
- 06. Ali
- 07. Seleo
- 08. Poro
- 09. Lupai
- 10. Wauningi
- 11. Pes
- 12. Prou/Vokau
- 13. Lemieng
- 14. Chinapeli
- 15. Kiriel-Kopom
- 16. Paup
- 17. Yakamul 1
- 18. Yakamul 2
- 19. Ulau 1
- 20. Ulau 2
- 21. Suain
- 22. Labuain
- 23. Wamsis
- 24. Balup
- 25. Matapau
- 80. Aitape

== Islands ==
Islands located within the LLG are:

- Angel Island
- Ali Island
- Seleo Island
- Tumleo Island
