= Ali Island =

Island in Papua New Guinea

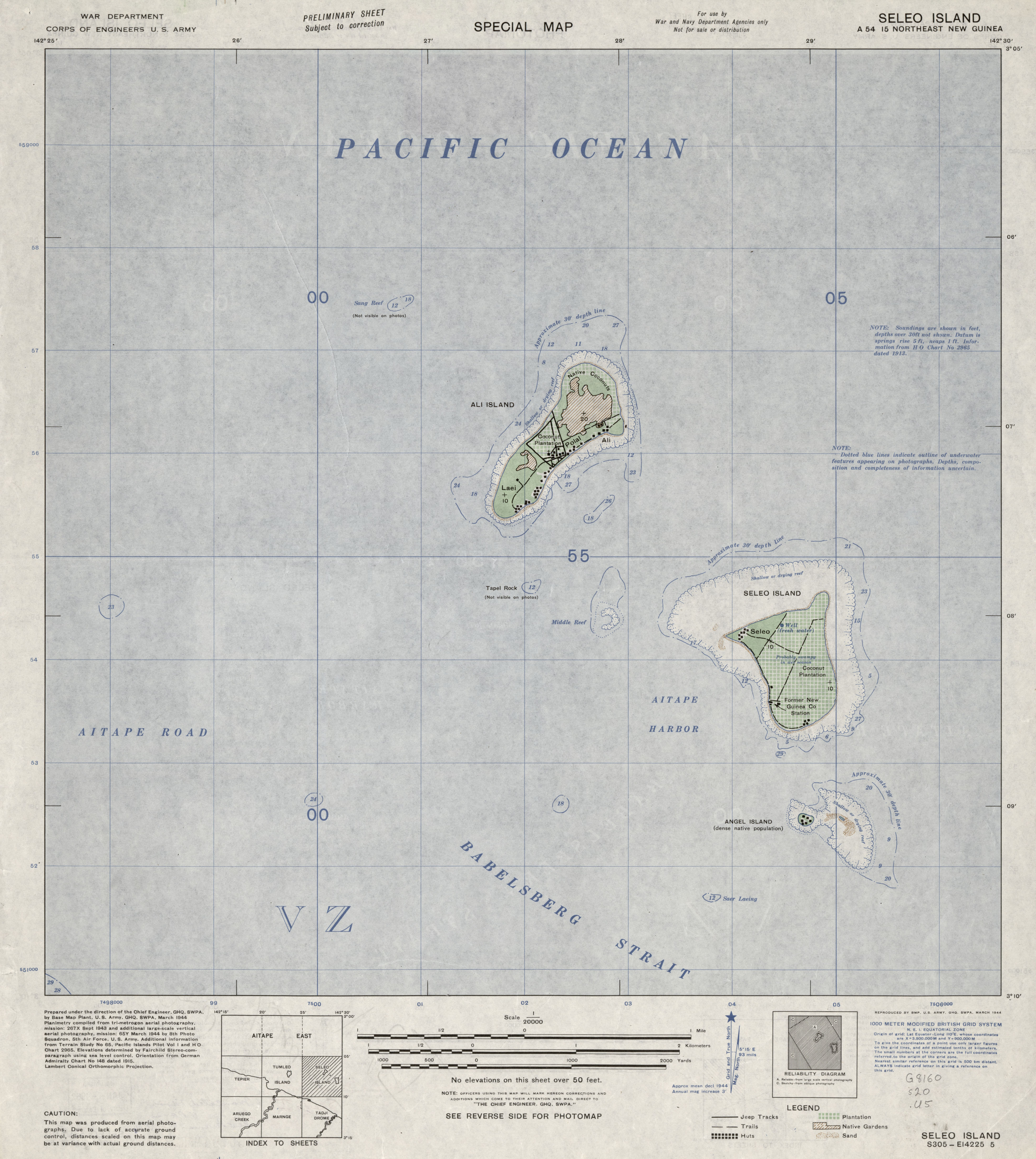
- Map of Ali Island and Seleo Island

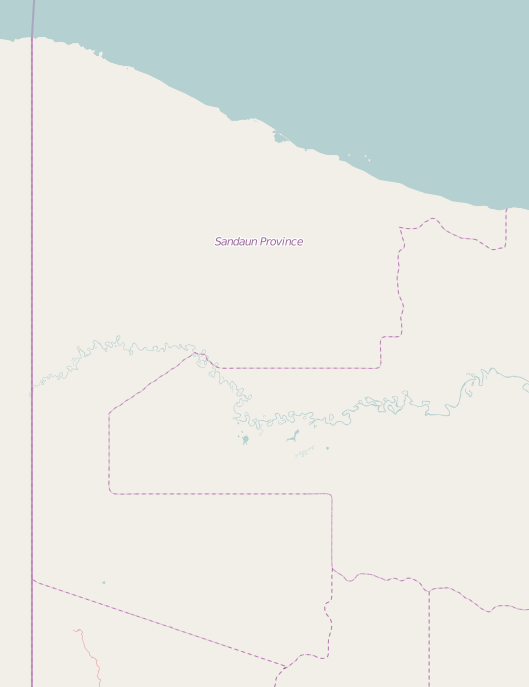
- Location within Sandaun Province Location within Papua New Guinea

Geography
- Location: Oceania
- Coordinates: 3.117403°S 142.401031°E

Administration
- Papua New Guinea
- Province: Sandaun Province
- LLG: East Aitape Rural LLG

Ali Island is a populated island in East Aitape Rural LLG, Sandaun Province, Papua New Guinea.

The Yakamul language is spoken on the island.
