= Mariveles =

Municipality in Bataan, Philippines

- Municipality
- Municipality of Mariveles
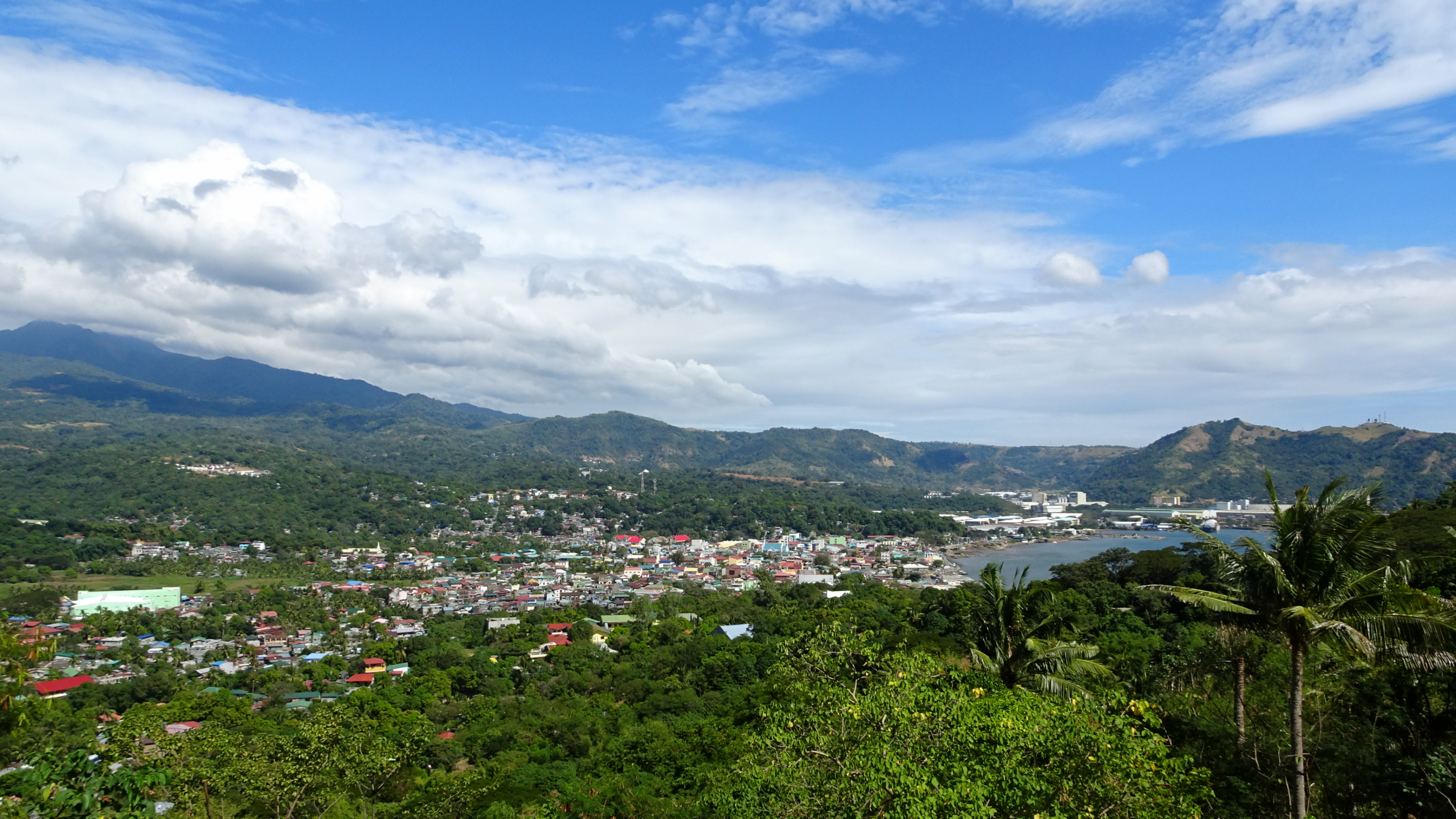
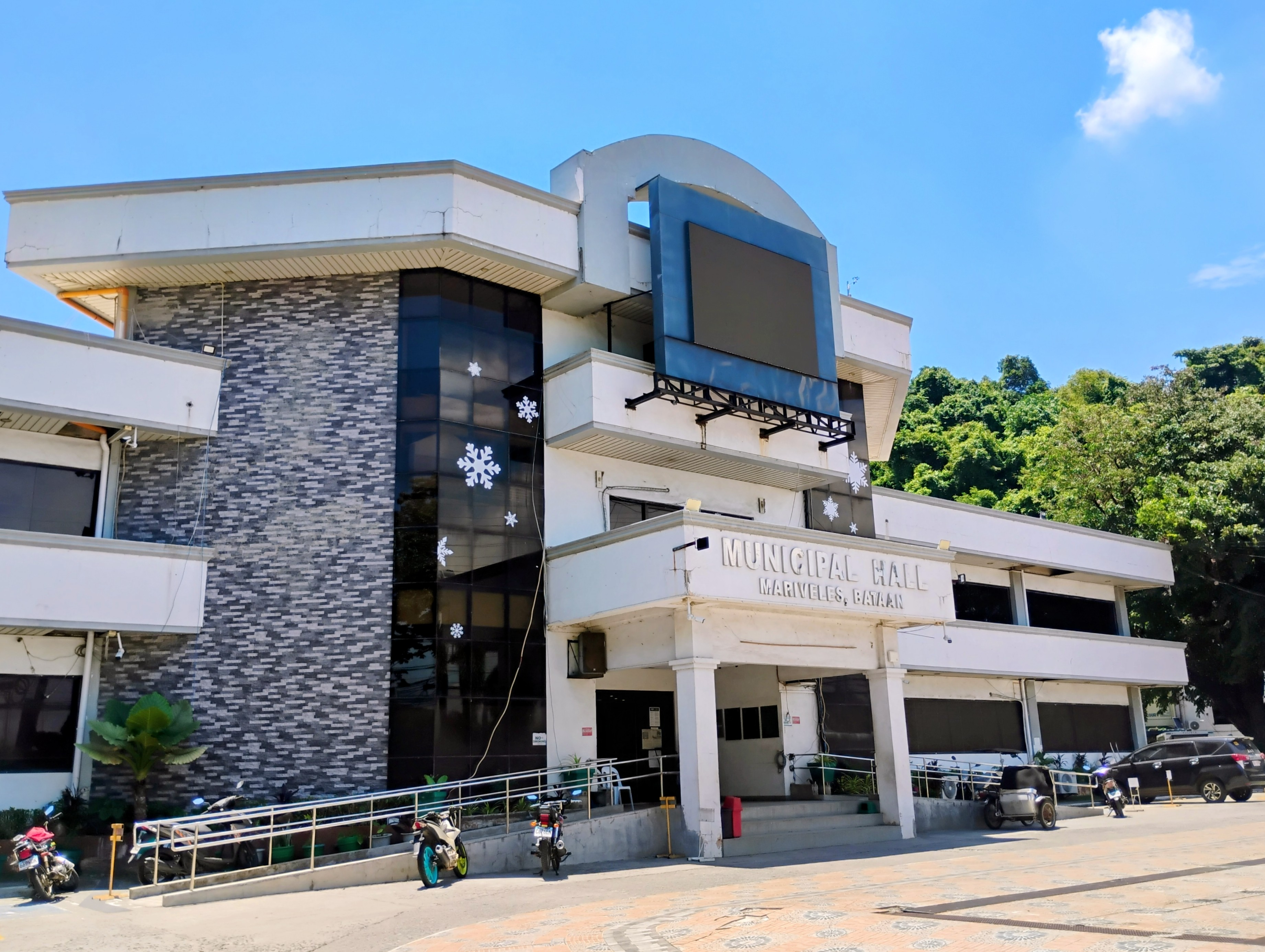
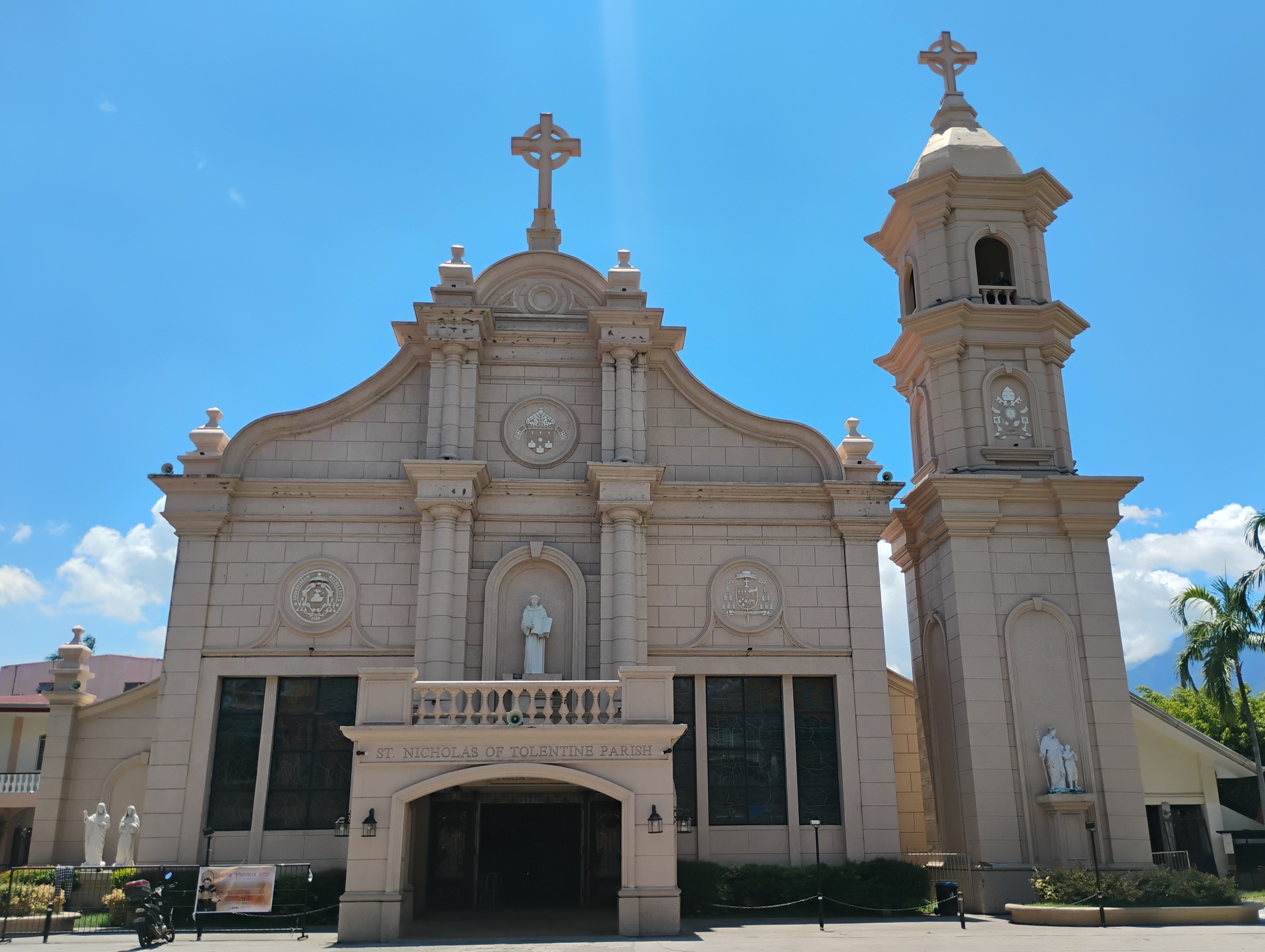
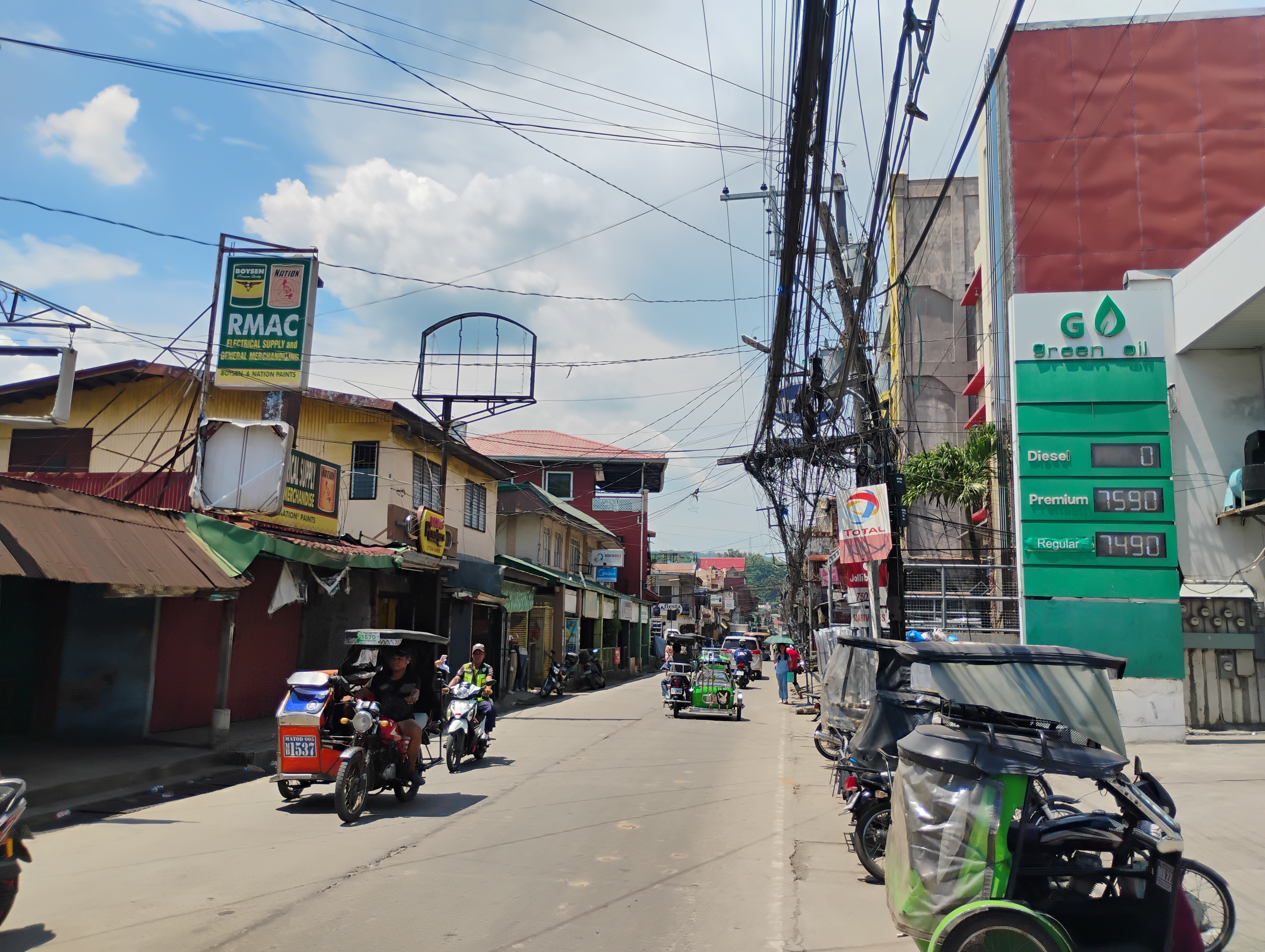
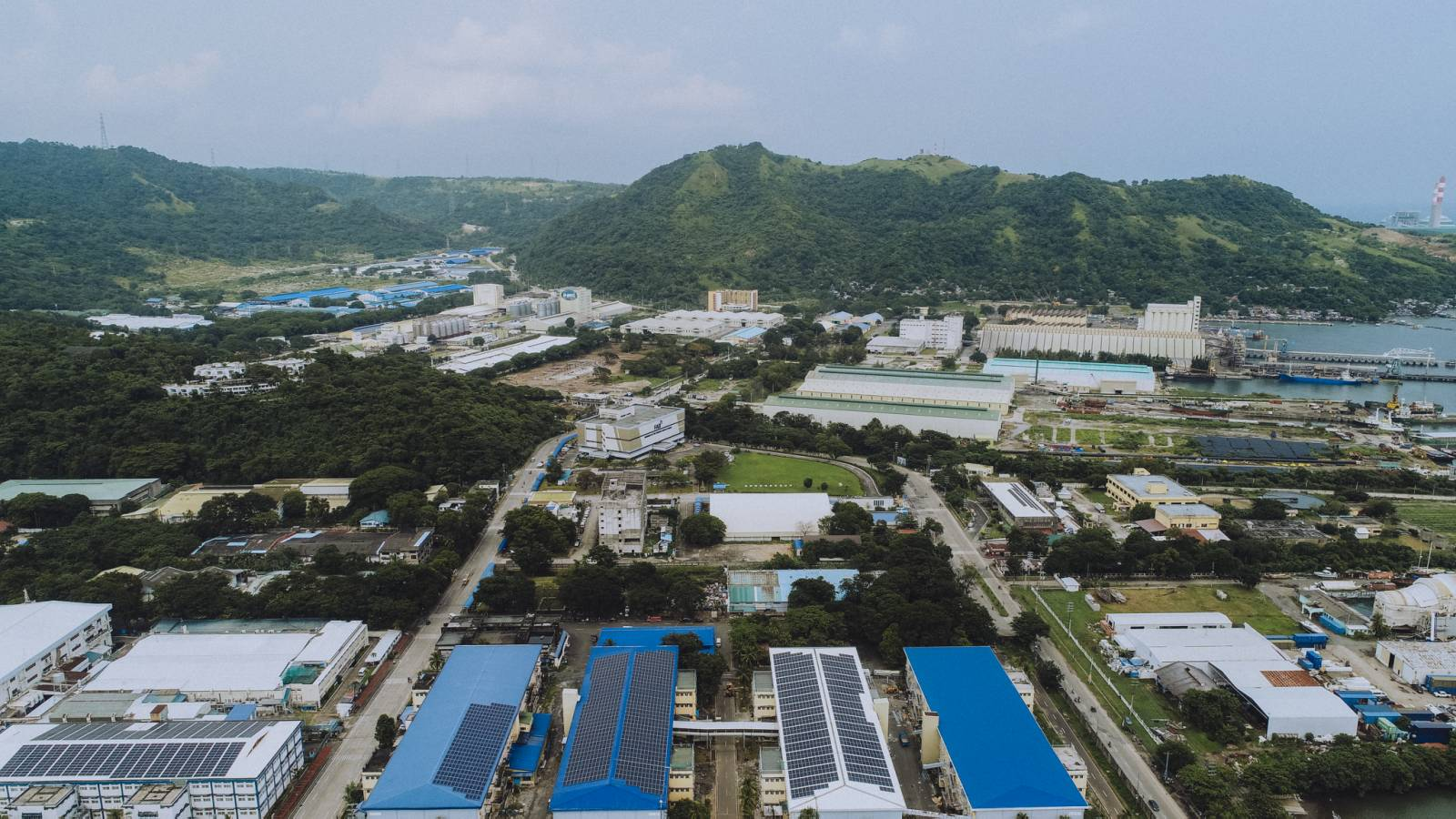
- Mariveles skyline Mariveles Municipal Hall Saint Nicholas of Tolentine Parish Church Downtown Mariveles Freeport Area of Bataan

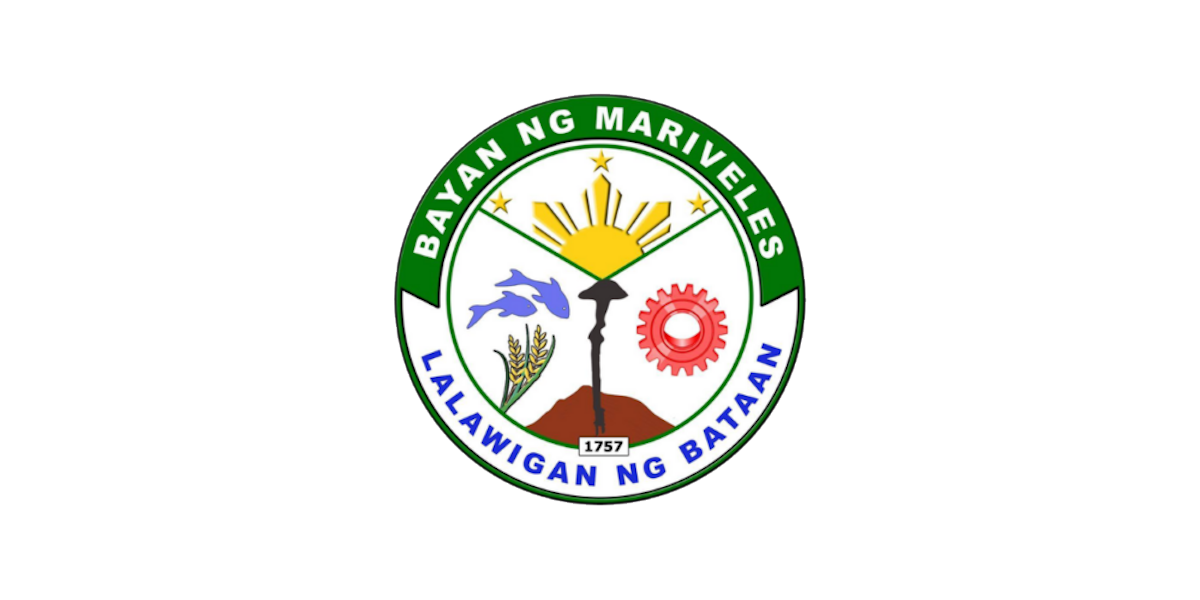
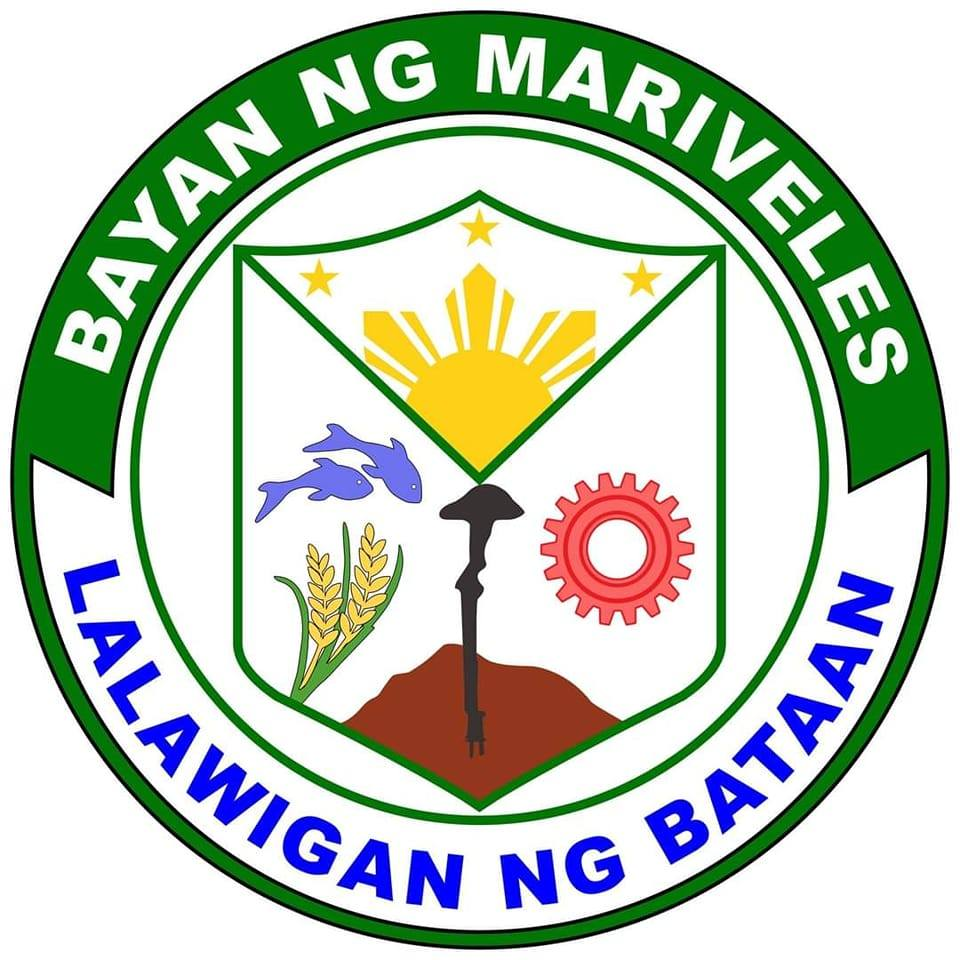
- Flag Seal

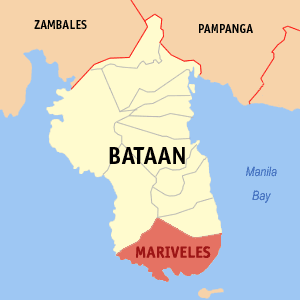
- Map of Bataan with Mariveles highlighted
- Interactive map of Mariveles
- Location within the Philippines
- Coordinates: 14°26′N 120°29′E
- Country: Philippines
- Region: Central Luzon
- Province: Bataan
- District: 3rd district
- Founded: 1754
- Named for: Maria Velez
- Barangays: 18 (see Barangays)

Government
  - Type: Sangguniang Bayan
  - Mayor: Ace Jello Concepcion
  - Vice Mayor: Jesse I. Concepcion
  - Representative: Maria Angela S. Garcia
  - Municipal Council: Members: Ronald R. Arcenal; Susan M. Murillo; Jester Ivan O. Ricafrente; Jose M. Carandang; Danilo T. Banal; Omar B. Cornejo; Vonnel A. Isip; Jeff B. Peñaloza
  - Electorate: 95,756 voters (2025)

Area
  - Total: 153.90 km^{2} (59.42 sq mi)
- Elevation: 96 m (315 ft)
- Highest elevation: 561 m (1,841 ft)
- Lowest elevation: 0 m (0 ft)

Population (2024 census)
  - Total: 156,200
  - Density: 1,015/km^{2} (2,629/sq mi)
  - Households: 39,410

Economy
  - Income class: 1st municipal income class
  - Poverty incidence: 8.06% (2023)
  - Revenue: ₱ 1,628 million (2024)
  - Assets: ₱ 3,977 million (2024)
  - Expenditure: ₱ 1,255 million (2024)
  - Liabilities: ₱ 2,118 million (2024)

Service provider
  - Electricity: Peninsula Electric Cooperative (PENELCO)
- Time zone: UTC+8 (PST)
- ZIP code: 2105, 2106 (Freeport Area of Bataan), 2109 (Cabcaben)
- PSGC: 0300807000
- IDD : area code: +63 (0)47
- Native languages: Mariveleño; Tagalog
- Website: marivelesbataan.gov.ph

Mariveles, officially the Municipality of Mariveles (Tagalog: Bayan ng Mariveles), is a municipality in the province of Bataan, Philippines. According to the 2024 census, it has a population of 156,200 people, making it the most populous in the province.

== History ==
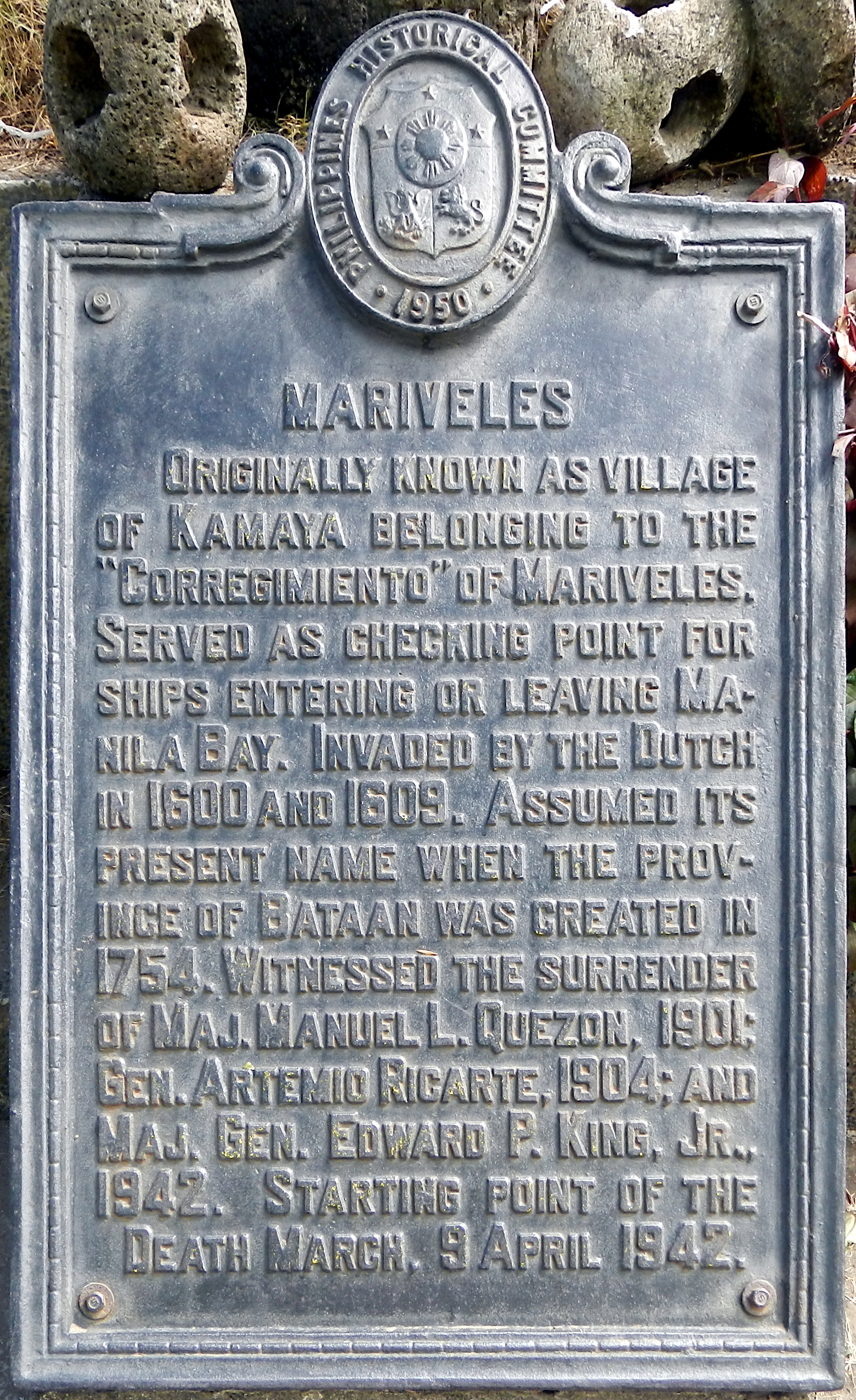
National historical marker installed in 1950 and located at the municipal hall

=== Colonial era history ===
Incorporated to the Kingdom of the Spains and the Indies by a Franciscan friar in 1578, Mariveles was called the town of Camaya and was part of the Corregimiento of Mariveles, including Bagac and Morong, Corregidor and Maragondon, Cavite. The name Mariveles comes from "Maria Velez", a Mexican nun who eloped with a monk back in the 1600s. With its natural cove, the port was used by ships from China and Spain to resupply.

The Superior Decree of July 1754 declared Mariveles' independence from Pampanga.

In the 19th century, the Americans established the first quarantine station in the old Spanish Leprosarium Hospital (now known as the Mariveles Mental Wellness and General Hospital). The 1818 Spanish census showed there to be 1,522 native families and 3 Spanish-Filipino families.

A two-room school building made of wood and nipa was constructed beside the municipal hall on Zamora Street during the 1908–1909 administration of Mayor Esteban Gonzales. The school initially accommodated pupils in the first and second grades.

=== World War II ===
Mariveles Bay was the site of Mariveles Naval Section Base, completed for the United States Asiatic Fleet on 22 July 1941, and was surrendered to the Imperial Japanese Army on 9 April 1942. The Mariveles Airfield, a 3,800-foot (1,200 m) dirt runway at the Section Base, was the starting point of the Bataan Death March.

=== During the Marcos dictatorship ===
Just as the Philippines faced economic and political instability during the runup to the 1969 Philippine presidential election and the subsequent second term of the presidency of Ferdinand Marcos, it was revealed that two communities - Barrio NASSCO and Barrio Camaya - where the workers of the National Shipyard and Steel Corporation lived would be torn down for conversion into the new Mariveles Free Trade Zone in 1969 (also establishing the Philippine Economic Zone Authority (PEZA), compelling the relocation of the residents who in turn launched protests until the MFTZ became BEPZ in 1972. BEPZ has made the port a trading zone, and brought industry to the municipality. Agriculture is a large part of the port export.

With only a year left in his last constitutionally allowed term as president, Ferdinand Marcos placed the Philippines under Martial Law in September 1972 and thus retained the position for fourteen more years. This martial law era became known for human rights abuses, particularly targeting political opponents, student activists, journalists, religious workers, farmers, and others who fought against the Marcos dictatorship. This included activists who fought the relocation of the communities in Barrio NASSCO and Barrio Camaya. One of the most prominent of these activists was Evelyn Pacheco-Mangulabnan, a Mariveles native who would later be honored at the Philippines' Bantayog ng mga Bayani for her role in resisting Marcos' authoritarian regime.

=== Contemporary history ===
In July 2010, the Freeport Area of Bataan Act (Republic Act 9728, approved on October 23, 2009) became effective, turning the Bataan Export Processing Zone or Bataan Economic Zone (BEPZ/BEZ) under PEZA into Freeport Area of Bataan (FAB) of Authority of the Freeport Area of Bataan (AFAB).

During the first term of Mayor Ace Jello Concepcion in 2017, the municipality's coat of arms was updated to the current one featuring a Philippine flag star and sun, fish, grain, Bataan Death March marker, mountain, and gear, and with the founding year 1757. It changed its color from green to pink as the second version from 2019 to 2022 under Jo Castañeda. With Concepcion's start of second term as mayor on June 30, 2022, the seal reverted to its original green color.

On February 12, 2024, with the approval of the Office of the President of the Philippines through Executive Secretary Lucas Bersamin, the current third version of the 2017 seal began to be used where the seal now resembles the Great Seal of the Philippines and dropped the establishment year. However, the first version still continued to be used nowadays.

== Geography ==
Mariveles is located around the Mariveles Bay, a large cove at the southern tip of the Bataan Peninsula. It is adjacent to Manila Bay to the east, and the South China Sea to the west.

Mariveles is 40 kilometres (25 mi) from Balanga and 164 kilometres (102 mi) from Manila via the North Luzon Expressway (NLEX), Jose Abad Santos Avenue, and Roman Highway. It borders Bagac to the west and northwest, Limay to the north and northeast, and Manila Bay to the east.

According to the Philippine Statistics Authority, the municipality has a land area of 153.90 square kilometres (59.42 sq mi) constituting 11.21% of the 1,372.98-square-kilometre- (530.11 sq mi) total area of Bataan. Of this, about 69% consist of the pastureland, 19% of forestland, 6% agricultural lands and the remaining 6% for residential and industrial use.

=== Climate ===
Climate data for Mariveles, Bataan
Month	Jan	Feb	Mar	Apr	May	Jun	Jul	Aug	Sep	Oct	Nov	Dec	Year
Mean daily maximum °C (°F)	31 (88)	32 (90)	34 (93)	35 (95)	33 (91)	31 (88)	29 (84)	29 (84)	29 (84)	29 (84)	30 (86)	31 (88)	31 (88)
Mean daily minimum °C (°F)	19 (66)	19 (66)	20 (68)	23 (73)	25 (77)	25 (77)	24 (75)	25 (77)	25 (77)	24 (75)	23 (73)	20 (68)	23 (73)
Average precipitation mm (inches)	7 (0.3)	8 (0.3)	14 (0.6)	26 (1.0)	127 (5.0)	210 (8.3)	263 (10.4)	272 (10.7)	218 (8.6)	114 (4.5)	46 (1.8)	21 (0.8)	1,326 (52.3)
Average rainy days	4.0	4.0	6.9	11.2	21.0	24.5	27.4	26.9	25.9	21.9	13.4	6.3	193.4
Source: Meteoblue (modeled/calculated data, not measured locally)

=== Barangays ===
Mariveles is politically subdivided into 18 barangays, with two are located within the jurisdiction of Freeport Area of Bataan (FAB). Each barangay consists of puroks and some have sitios.

PSGC	Barangay	Population			±% p.a.	
		2024		2010		
030807001	Alas‑asin	9.6%	15,047	11,606	▴	1.80%
030807002	Alion	2.1%	3,264	3,015	▴	0.55%
030807013	Balon‑Anito	7.9%	12,286	10,255	▴	1.25%
030807006	Baseco Country (Nassco)	2.9%	4,581	3,440	▴	1.99%
030807003	Batangas II	3.8%	5,951	5,122	▴	1.04%
030807014	Biaan	1.2%	1,837	1,571	▴	1.08%
030807004	Cabcaben	4.1%	6,427	6,269	▴	0.17%
030807015	Camaya	9.5%	14,869	12,077	▴	1.44%
030807016	Ipag	6.4%	10,010	9,430	▴	0.41%
030807005	Lucanin	3.3%	5,169	3,570	▴	2.57%
030807017	Malaya	3.1%	4,910	5,211	▾	−0.41%
030807018	Maligaya	2.8%	4,407	4,416	▾	−0.01%
030807019	Mt. View	6.7%	10,461	8,843	▴	1.16%
030807008	Poblacion	5.1%	7,938	8,074	▾	−0.12%
030807009	San Carlos	1.0%	1,517	1,592	▾	−0.33%
030807010	San Isidro	3.7%	5,761	5,816	▾	−0.07%
030807011	Sisiman	4.0%	6,221	5,837	▴	0.44%
030807020	Townsite	4.4%	6,880	6,563	▴	0.32%
	Total		156,200	112,707	▴	2.27%

== Demographics ==
Population census of Mariveles

Year	Pop.	±% p.a.
1903	2,350	—
1918	2,948	+1.52%
1939	4,444	+1.97%
1948	4,462	+0.04%
1960	9,067	+6.09%
1970	16,157	+5.94%
1975	25,167	+9.29%
1980	48,594	+14.06%

Year	Pop.	±% p.a.
1990	60,761	+2.26%
1995	76,626	+4.44%
2000	85,779	+2.45%
2007	102,844	+2.53%
2010	112,707	+3.39%
2015	127,536	+2.38%
2020	149,879	+3.46%
2024	156,200	+1.00%

Source: Philippine Statistics Authority

In the 2024 census, Mariveles had a population of 156,200 people. The population density was 1,000 inhabitants per square kilometre (2,600/sq mi).

Mariveles is home to an Aeta community speaking a Sambalic language called Mariveleño.

== Economy ==
Poverty incidence of Mariveles (%)

Source: Philippine Statistics Authority

Freeport Area of Bataan administration building at Mariveles

The Freeport Area of Bataan (formerly known as Mariveles Free Trade Zone from June 21, 1969, to November 20, 1972, and Bataan Export Processing Zone (BEPZ) and Bataan Economic Zone (BEZ) from November 20, 1972, to July 2010 under Philippine Economic Zone Authority (PEZA)) is a 1,691 hectares (4,180 acres) industrial complex in Mariveles town that enjoys business advantages, including tax incentives, natural endowments, and leadership under Authority of the Freeport Area of Bataan (AFAB) Chairman and Administrator Mohammed Hussein Pangandaman. It is the only freeport in the country with a 10.9 million cubic meter-capacity dam that delivers 14 million gallons of water every day. It is complemented by water treatment and sewerage treatment plants which employ a sustainable waste water solution.

== Government ==
=== Local government ===
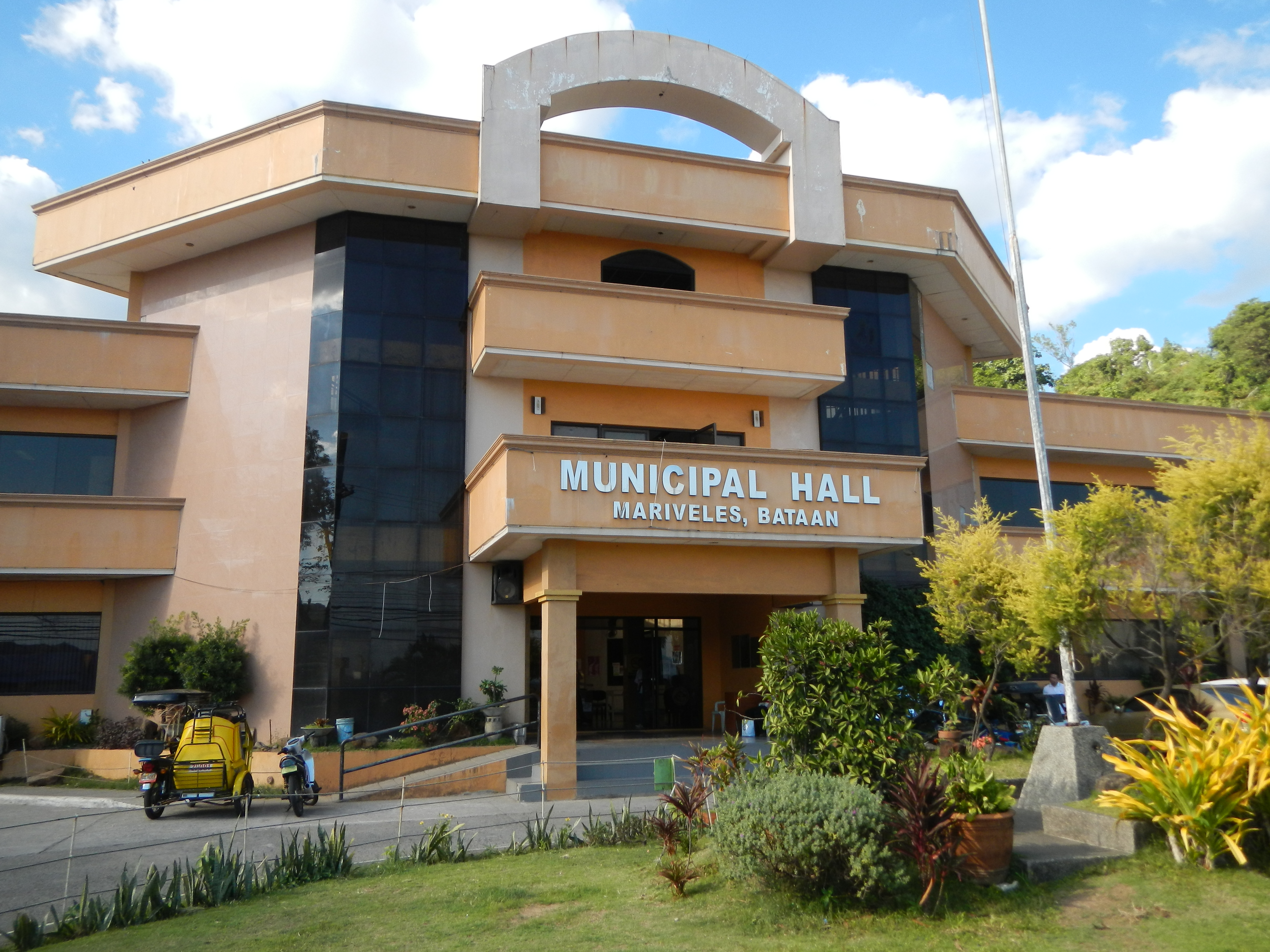
Municipal hall

Pursuant to the Local government in the Philippines", the political seat of the municipal government is located at the Municipal Hall. In the History of the Philippines (1521–1898), the Gobernadorcillo is the Chief Executive who held office in the Presidencia. During the American rule (1898–1946) (History of the Philippines (1898-1946)), the elected Mayor and local officials, including the appointed ones held office at the Municipal Hall. The legislative and executive departments perform their functions in the Sangguniang Bayan (Session Hall) and Municipal Trial Court, respectively, and are located in the second floor of the Town Hall and in the adjacent building.

The Municipal Mayor as of the 2022 national and local elections, serving his second term in office, is Ace Jello "AJ" C. Concepcion.

=== Elected officials ===
Members of the Mariveles Municipal Council (2022–2025):

- Municipal Mayor: Ace Jello Concepcion
- Municipal Vice Mayor: Angelito S. Rubia
- Municipal Councilors:
  - Ronald R. Arcenal
  - Susan M. Murillo
  - Jester Ivan O. Ricafrente
  - Jose M. Carandang
  - Danilo T. Banal
  - Omar B. Cornejo
  - Vonnel A. Isip
  - Jeff B. Peñaloza
- Municipal ABC President: Marcialito L. Balan

District Representative (3rd Legislative District, Bataan): Maria Angela Garcia

=== Former mayors and local chief executives ===
The following is a historical list of the municipal mayors and earlier local chief executives of Mariveles. The title and organization of the municipal office changed during the Spanish colonial period, the Philippine Revolution, American administration, Japanese occupation, and postwar period.

Officeholder	Term of office	Notes
Atty. Jo P. Castañeda	2019–2022	
Ace Jello Concepcion	2016–2019, 2022–present	Incumbent
Jesse I. Concepcion	2007–2016	
Angel V. Peliglorio Jr.	1998–2007	
Oscar Delos Reyes	1988–1998	
Melba O. Buenaventura	December 1982–December 1987	
Cristina S. Sarreal	2 February 1980–November 1980; 1982	Served during two separate periods.
Dioscoro Manrique	April–December 1979	
Carlos L. Sarreal	March–April 1979	
Carlos L. Sarreal	1968–1971	
Benito Reyes	1960–1967	
Jose Advincula	1956–1959	
Silvestre Yraola	1946–1955	
Francisco Octavio	1945	Designated military mayor on 16 February 1945. Civil government was restored and reorganized under Mayor Silvestre Yraola on 22 March 1945.
No civil municipal government	1943	Municipal civil government ceased during the Japanese occupation.
Silvestre Yraola	1941–1942	Civil government was suspended on 9 April 1942.
Jose Sarreal	1935–1940	
Sebastian Rodriguez and Jose Sarreal	1934	Joint officeholders.
Sebastian Rodriguez	1932–1933	
Ciriaco Maglaya and Sebastian Rodriguez	1931	Joint officeholders.
Ciriaco Maglaya	1929–1930	
Jose Sarreal and Ciriaco Maglaya	1928	Joint officeholders.
Jose Sarreal	1926–1927	
Claro Paguio and Jose Sarreal	1925	Joint officeholders.
Claro Paguio	1920	
Jose Sarreal and Claro Paguio	1919–16 October 1919	Joint officeholders.
Jose Sarreal	1913–1918	
Valentin Semilla and Jose Sarreal	1912–16 October 1912	Joint officeholders.
Valentin Semilla	1910–1911	
Esteban Gonzales	1909	
Pedro Yaneza and Esteban Gonzales	1908	Joint officeholders.
Pedro Yaneza	1907	
Crisanto Rodriguez and Pedro Yaneza	1906–1 August 1906	Joint officeholders.
Crisanto Rodriguez	1905	
Crisanto Rodriguez	4 January 1904–1904	
Francisco Mendoza	1903	
Francisco Mendoza	1901–18 April 1901; 27 May 1901–1902	His administration was suspended from 18 April to 27 May 1901. He later served as interim presidente local.
Juan Rodriguez	7 January 1899–1899	Served as presidente local-alcalde.
Cipriano Diaz	1898–7 May 1898	Identified in the source as the Copo de Mariveles. Served with Antonio Mendoza, Julian, and Toribio Advincula.
Cipriano Diaz	1896–1897	
Juan Rodriguez and Cipriano Diaz	1895	Joint officeholders.
Juan Rodriguez	1894	
Hermogenes Bautista and Juan Rodriguez	1892	Joint officeholders.
Hermogenes Bautista and Antonino Mendoza	1891	Joint officeholders.
Hermogenes Bautista	1889–1890	
Hermogenes Bautista	1888	
Fausto Diaz	1887	
Fausto Diaz	1886	
Antonino Mendoza and Fausto Diaz	1885	Joint officeholders.
Antonino Mendoza	1884	
Mateo Noriega and Antonino Mendoza	1883	Joint officeholders.
Mateo Noriega	1882	
Juan Enriquez and Mateo Noriega	1881	Joint officeholders.
Juan Enriquez	1880	
Miguel Rodriguez and Juan Enriquez	1879	Joint officeholders.
Miguel Rodriguez	1877–1878	
Antonio Zoilan	1876	
Antonio Zoilan	1875	
Miguel Rodriguez	1874	
Mateo Noriega and Miguel Rodriguez	1873	Joint officeholders.
Fausto Diaz and Mateo Noriega	1869–1872	Joint officeholders.
Unknown	1868	
Gabriel Mendoza	1865–1867	
Fausto Diaz	1863–1864	
Unknown	1862	
Jose Rodriguez	1861	
Casimiro Rubia	1860	
Unknown	1857–1859	
Casimiro Rubia	1857	
Justo Bartolome Llagas	1856	
Cipriano Advincula and Fidelis Mendoza	1855	Joint officeholders.
Cipriano Advincula	1854	
Francisco de Guzman	1853	
Justo Bartolome and Francisco de Guzman	1852	Joint officeholders.
Cipriano Advincula and Justo Bartolome Llagas	1851	Joint officeholders.
Nicolas Advincula	21 January 1850–1850	
Bernardo Zoilan and Nicolas Jose	15 March 1849–1849	Joint officeholders.
Bernardo Zoilan	1848	
Unknown	1845–1847	
Bernardo Zoilan	1844	
Francisco de Guzman	1843	
Bernabe Enriquez	1842	
Bernardo Mendoza	1841	
Justo Bartolome and Bernardo Mendoza	1840	Joint officeholders.
Justo Bartolome	1839	
Locadio Gallardo	1838	
Bernardo Zoilan	1837	
Francisco de Guzman	1836	
Tomas Calimbas	23 February 1835–1835	
Unknown	1830–1834	
Bernardo de Orquiza	1829	
Unknown	1815–1828	
Julian de Guzman	1814	
Evaristo Alvares	1813	
Unknown	1812	
Domingo Zoilan	7 July 1811–1811	

== Tourism ==
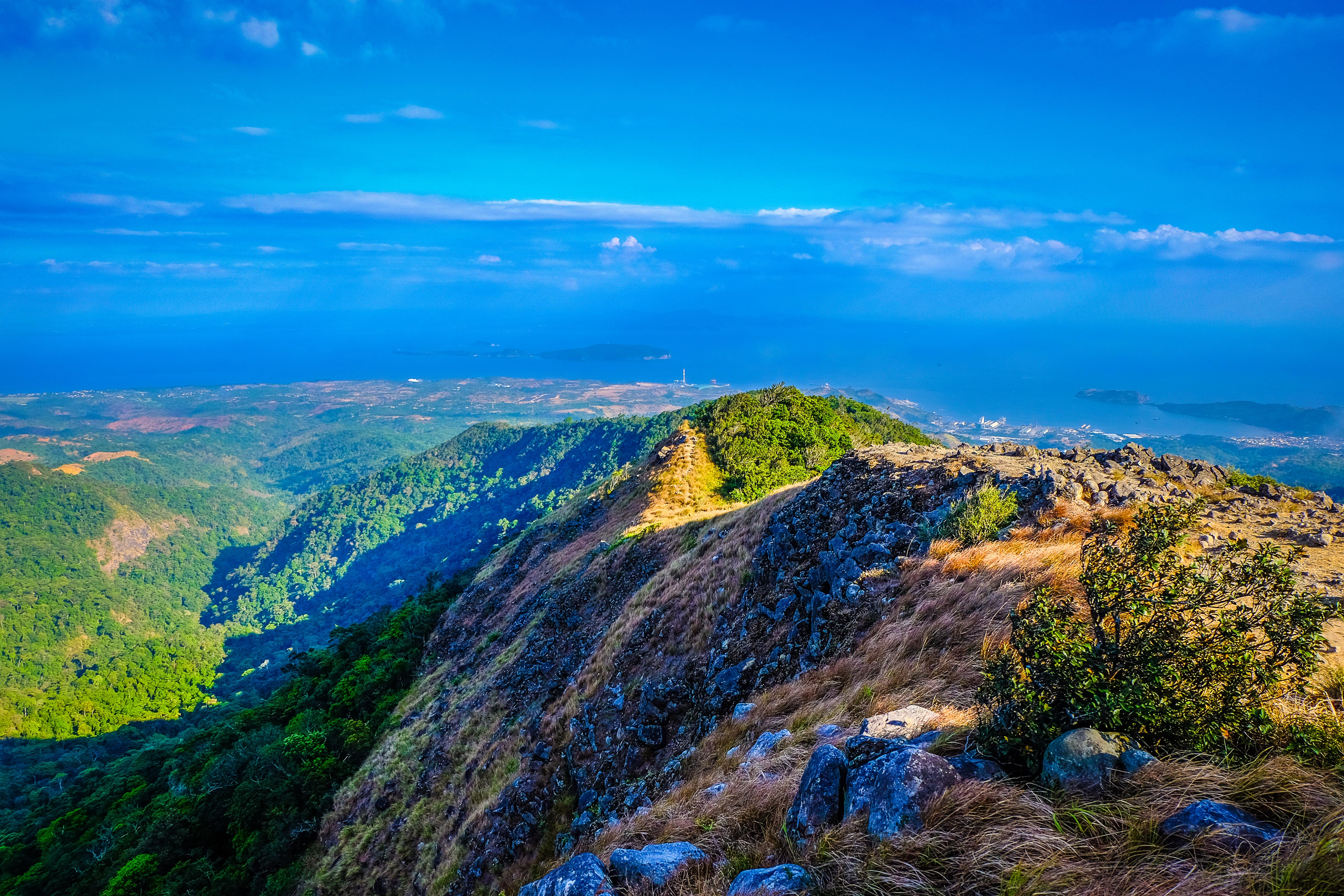
Tarak Ridge of Mount Mariveles

Mariveles' attractions, events and historical landmarks include:

- Mariveles Five Fingers: A series of coves that looks like five human fingers when viewed from the air.
- Mount Mariveles
- Km 0 marker of the Bataan Death March
- Lazareto de Mariveles: A Quarantine station established by the Spanish government in the 1850s to check and sanitize cargoes and passengers entering Manila. The Americans, upon their conquest of the Philippines, used the same system in their ports. The ruins of the old facility can be found inside the Mariveles Mental Hospital compound in downtown Mariveles.
- Mariveles Church

== Infrastructure ==
=== Transportation ===
Mariveles can be reached by a ferry plying the Mariveles to Manila route that has an approximate travel time of 40 minutes.

=== Expressway ===
The Bataan Provincial Expressway, also called Roman Super-Highway, is a limited-access toll expressway that connects Bataan to the provinces of the Central Luzon region in the Philippines. Mariveles is off Exit 55.

=== Energy sources ===
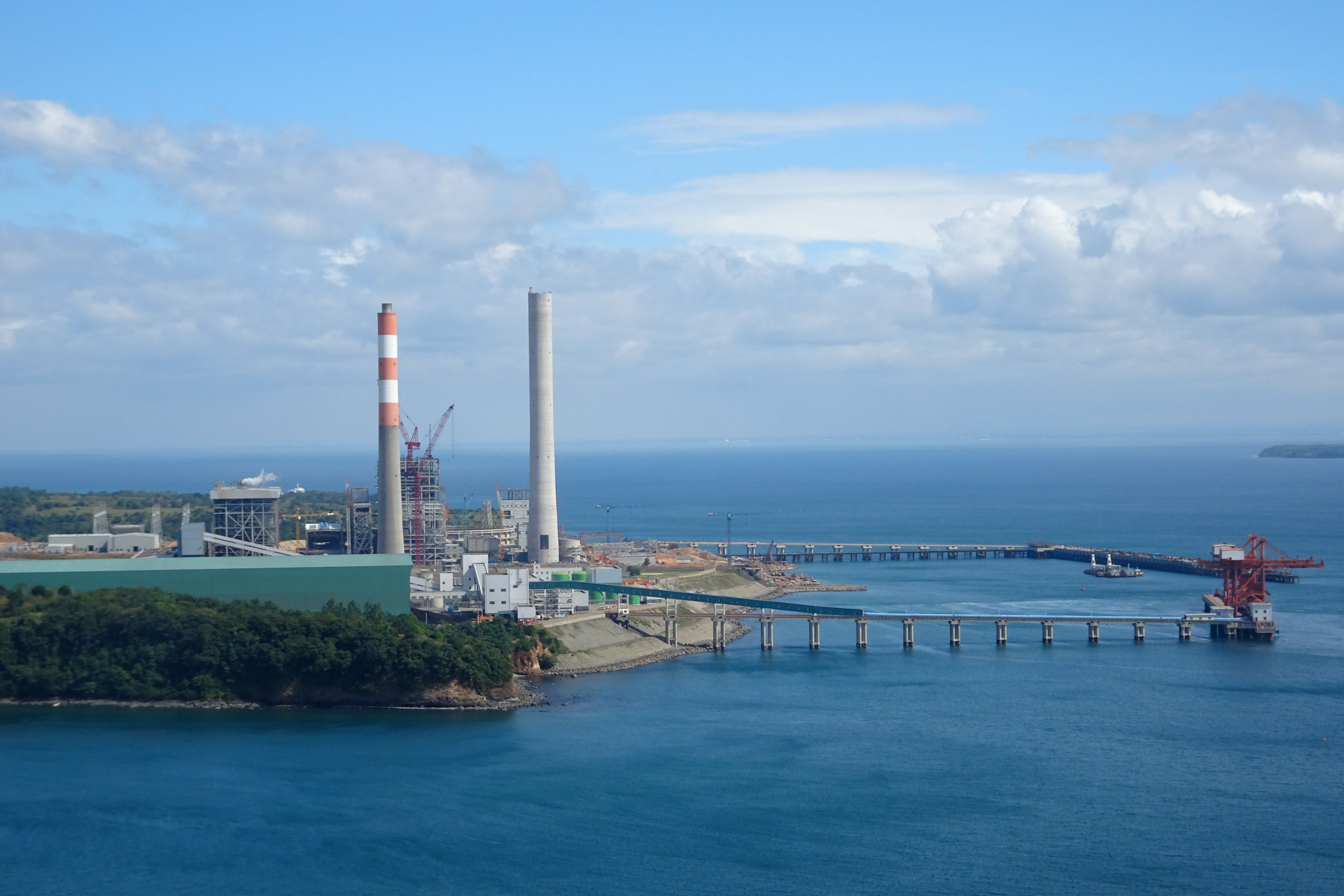
GN Power Mariveles Coal Power Plant

Utilities:

- Mariveles geothermal area in Bataan: a geothermal area situated along the West Luzon Volcanic Arc.
- GN Power Mariveles Coal Plant (GMCP), Alas-asin: 600-megawatt coal-fired power plant ($155 million was purchased by Conglomerate Ayala Corp. in December 2012).
- National Grid Corporation of the Philippines (NGCP) Mariveles Substation which hosts three 500 kV transmission lines which are Balsik–Mariveles, MPGC Mariveles–NGCP Mariveles, and GNPower Dinginin–NGCP Mariveles lines. The first is operated and maintained by NGCP, while the last two are by power generation companies (Mariveles Power Generation Corporation (MPGC) and GN Power Dinginin Ltd. Co. (GNPD) while having ownership on both respective lines).

== Education ==
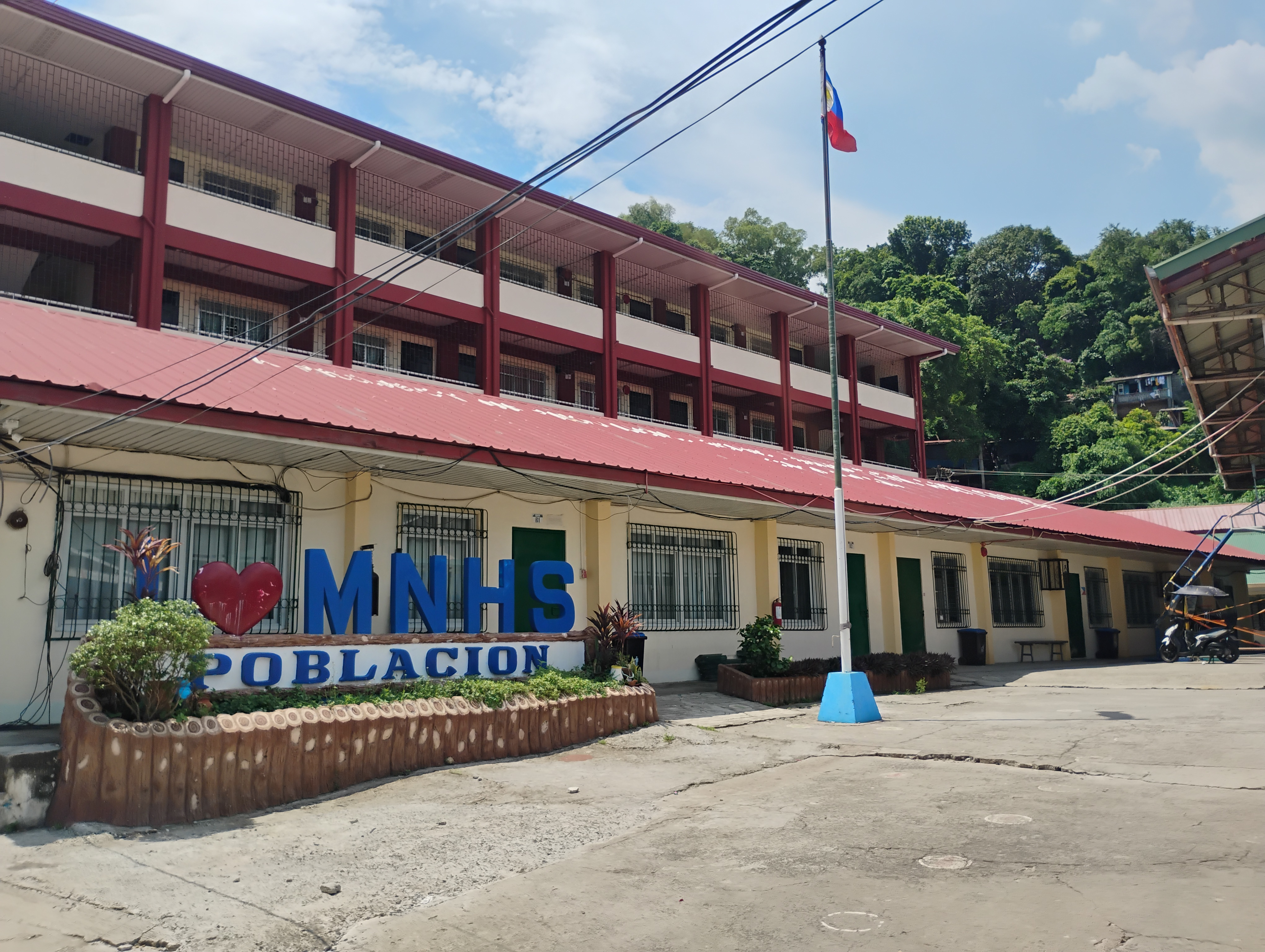
Mariveles National High School - Poblacion

The Mariveles Schools District Office governs all educational institutions within the municipality. It oversees the management and operations of all private and public, from primary to secondary schools.

=== Primary and elementary schools ===
- A. G. Llamas Elementary School
- Alasasin Christian Kiddie School
- Alasasin Elementary School
- Alion Elementary School
- Balon Elementary School
- Baseco Elementary School
- BATAAN GN CHRISTIAN SCHOOL
- Batangas 2 Elementary School
- Bayview Elementary School
- Bepz Elementary School
- BEPZ Multinational School
- Blessed Regina Protmann Catholic School
- Cabcaben Elementary School
- Cabcaben Kiddie School
- Christ's Sowers Foundational Learning Center
- Christian Community School of Mariveles
- Ipag Christian Academy
- Ipag Elementary School
- Logos International Christian Academy of Mariveles
- Lucanin Elementary School
- Marina Bay Elementary School
- Mt. View Elementary School
- Renato L. Cayetano Memorial School
- Santa Mariana de Jesus Academy
- Sisiman Elementary School
- SNCCC Learning Center of Mariveles
- St. Nicholas Catholic School of Mariveles
- St. Vincent Kindergarten
- Sto. Niño Biaan Elementary School
- Sunny Hillside School
- The Salvation Army Educational Services
- Townsite Elementary School

=== Secondary schools ===
- Baseco National High School
- Biaan Aeta Integrated School
- Ipag National High School
- Llamas Memorial Institute
- Mariveles National High School - Cabcaben
- Mariveles National High School - Cabcaben Annex - Alasasin
- Mariveles National High School - Cabcaben Annex - Batangas II
- Mariveles National High School - Cabcaben Annex - New Alion
- Mariveles National High School - Camaya Campus
- Mariveles National High School - Poblacion
- Mariveles National High School - Poblacion Annex - Sisiman
- Mariveles National High School Malaya
- Mariveles Senior High School - Sitio Mabuhay
- Mountain View Village Community School

=== Higher educational institutions ===
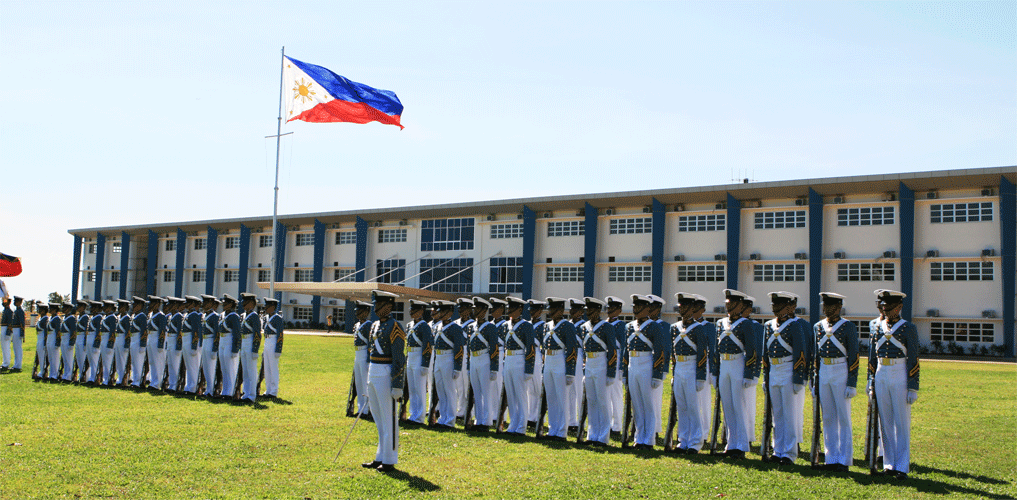
Maritime Academy of Asia and the Pacific

Tertiary educational institutions include:

- Polytechnic University of the Philippines Bataan (PUP), a state university that offers baccalaureate (college) degrees where students are scholars of the government (after passing an entrance exam). Opened in 1976, the campus is located at Barangay Malaya, Freeport Area of Bataan (FAB).
- Maritime Academy of Asia and the Pacific (MAAP) located at Kamaya Point, Barangay Alas-asin, offering courses in the maritime industry. Students are accepted after passing stringent academic and physical examinations.
- TESDA Mariveles Bataan Branch, located at Barangay Camaya and near the Public Market, Mariveles Municipal Hall, and Freeport Area of Bataan, offering technical and vocational courses.
- Softnet Information Technology Center (SITC) located at second floor SFB #8, FAB, offering associate degrees in computer studies.
- Llamas Memorial Institute Inc.
- St. Nicholas Catholic School of Mariveles Inc. (SNCSM) located at Padre Zamora st., near St. Nicolas of Tolentine Parish

== Gallery ==
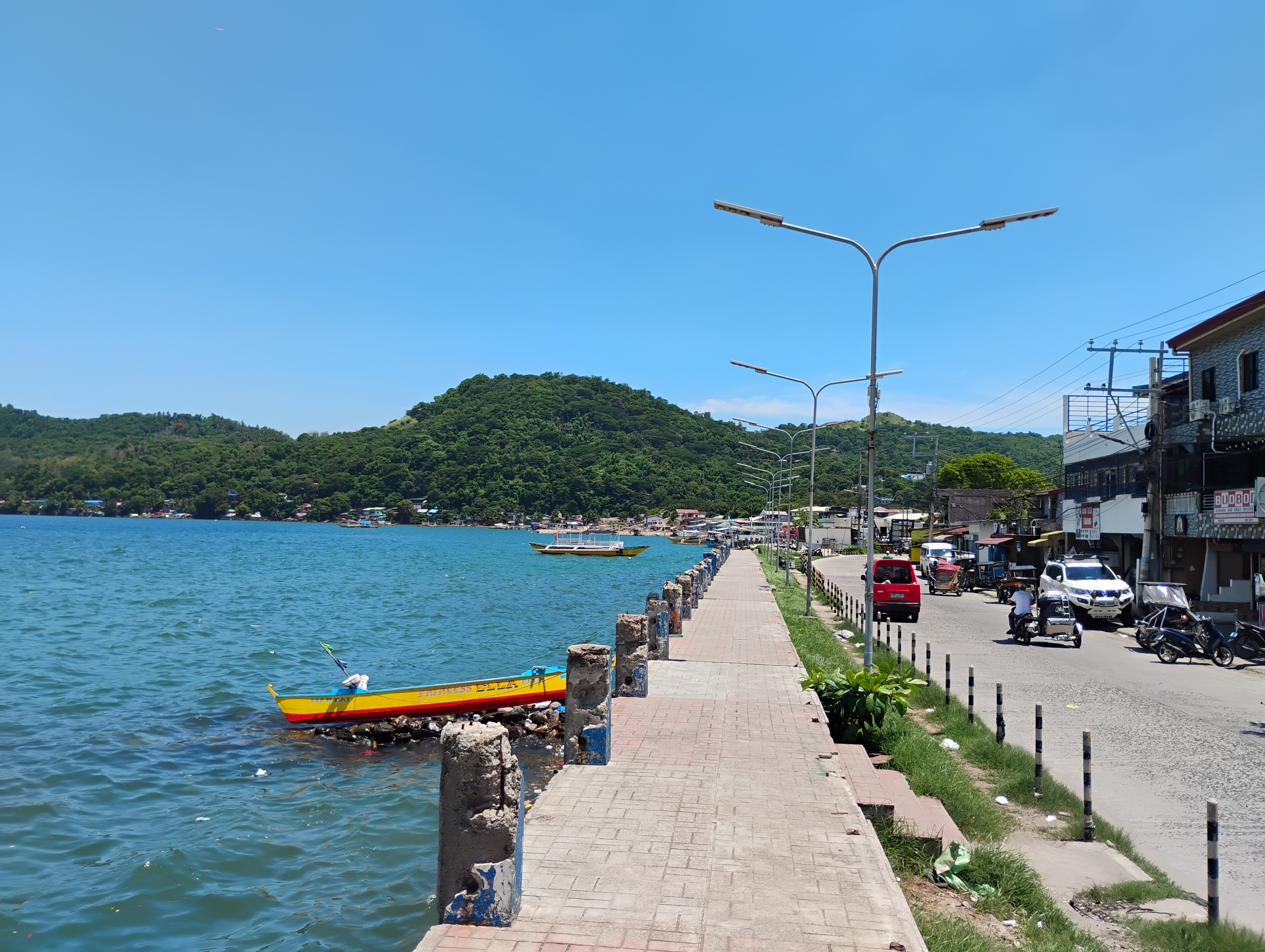
Roman Boulevard Baywalk Park

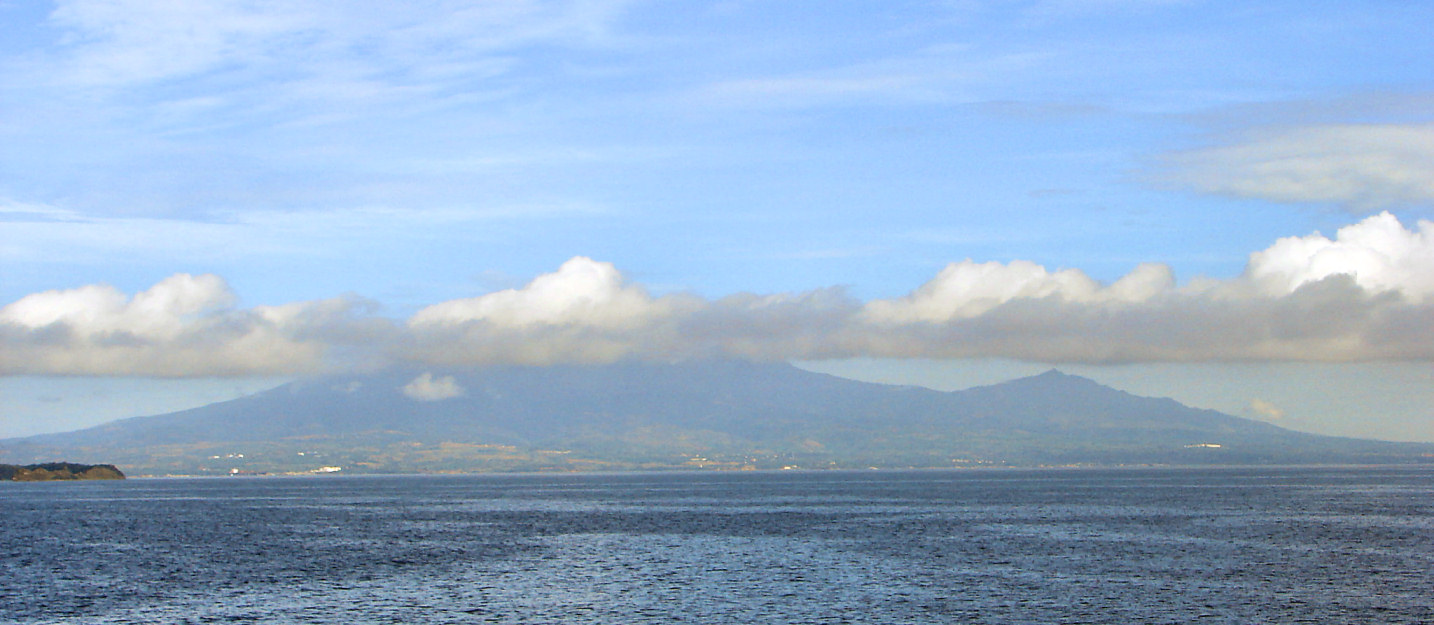
Remote view of Mariveles

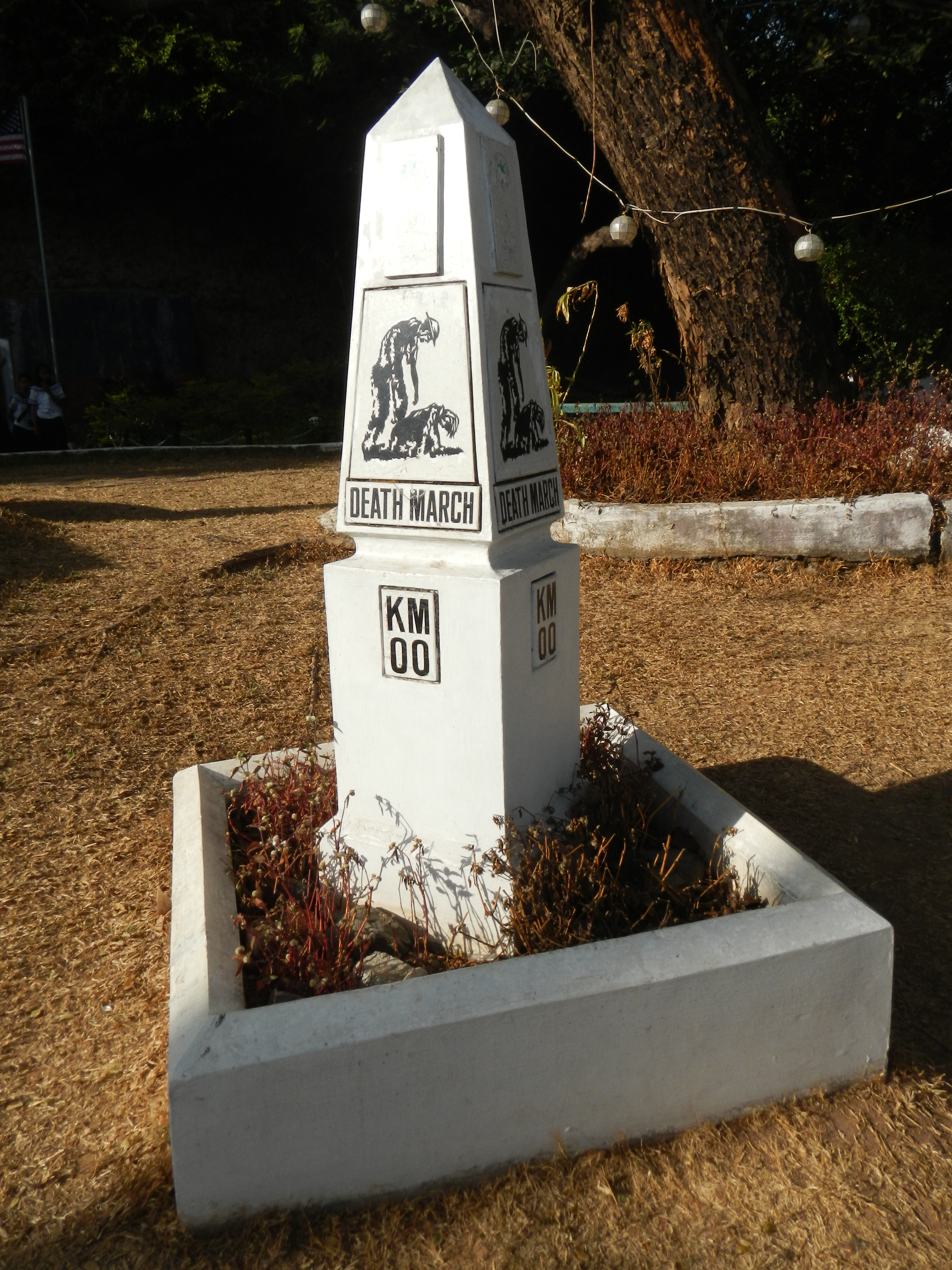
Zero Kilometer Death March Marker

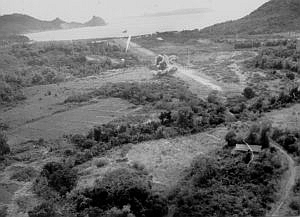
Bataan Peninsula on 24 January 1945, with Mariveles Seaplane base, port and Airfield. Japan is bombing the runway. Mariveles surrendered on April 10, 1942, the start of Bataan Death March. Mariveles was retaken in February 1945

Mariveles District Hospital

== See also ==
- Roman Catholic Diocese of Balanga
