= Tumleo Island =

Island in Papua New Guinea

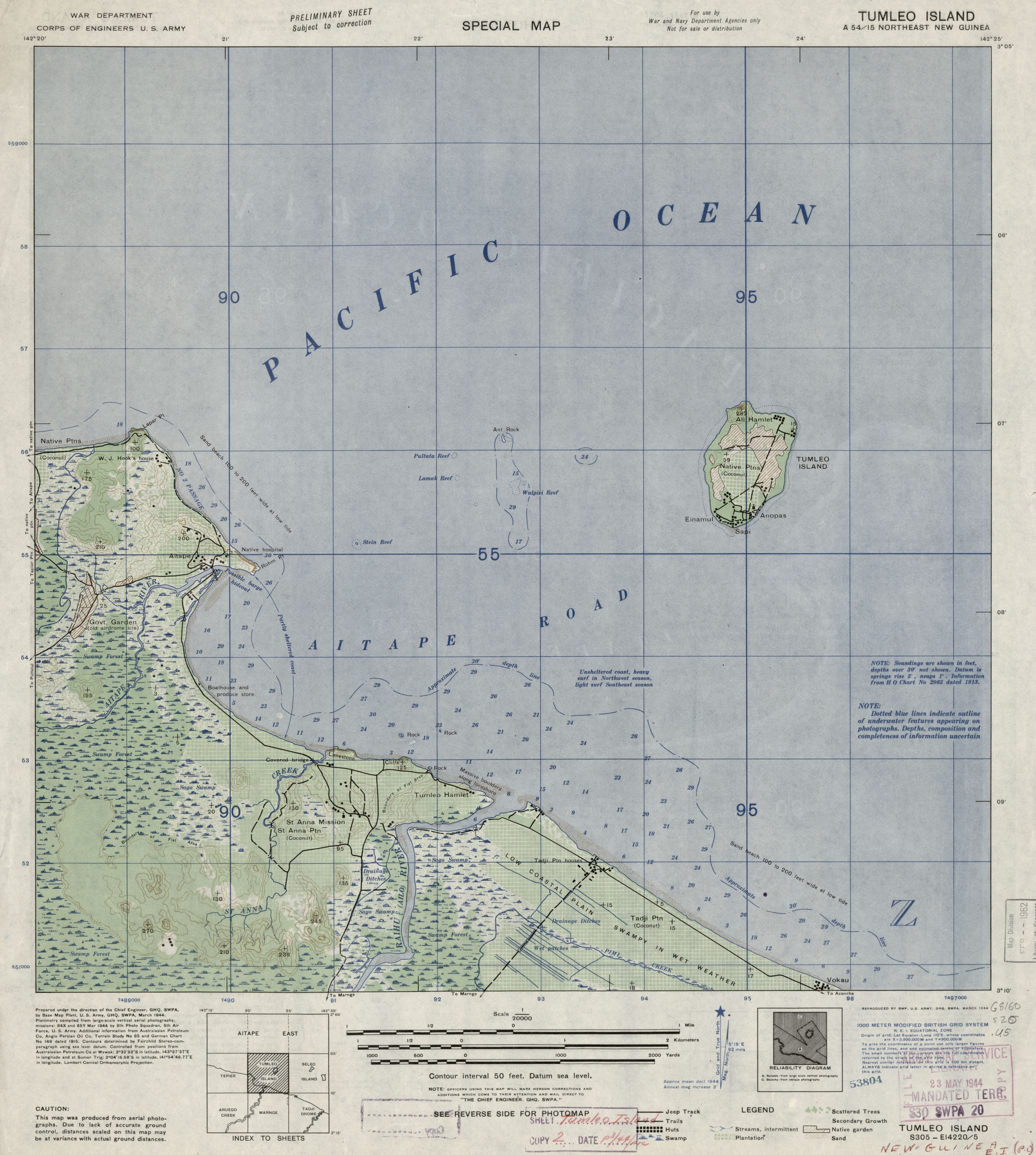
- Tumleo Island off the coast from the town of Aitape

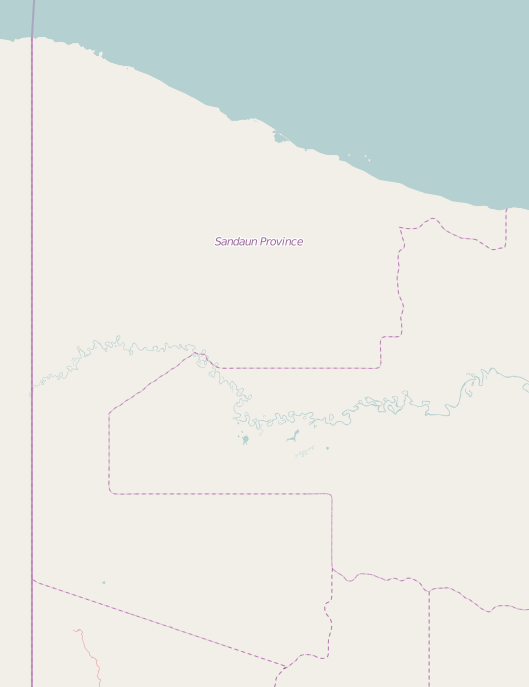
- Location within Sandaun Province Location within Papua New Guinea

Geography
- Location: Oceania
- Coordinates: 3.126188°S 142.398558°E

Administration
- Papua New Guinea
- Province: Sandaun Province
- LLG: East Aitape Rural LLG

Tumleo or Tumeleo is a populated island off the northern coast of Sandaun Province, Papua New Guinea, in East Aitape Rural LLG,.

The Tumleo language is spoken on the island.
