= Port of Subic Bay =

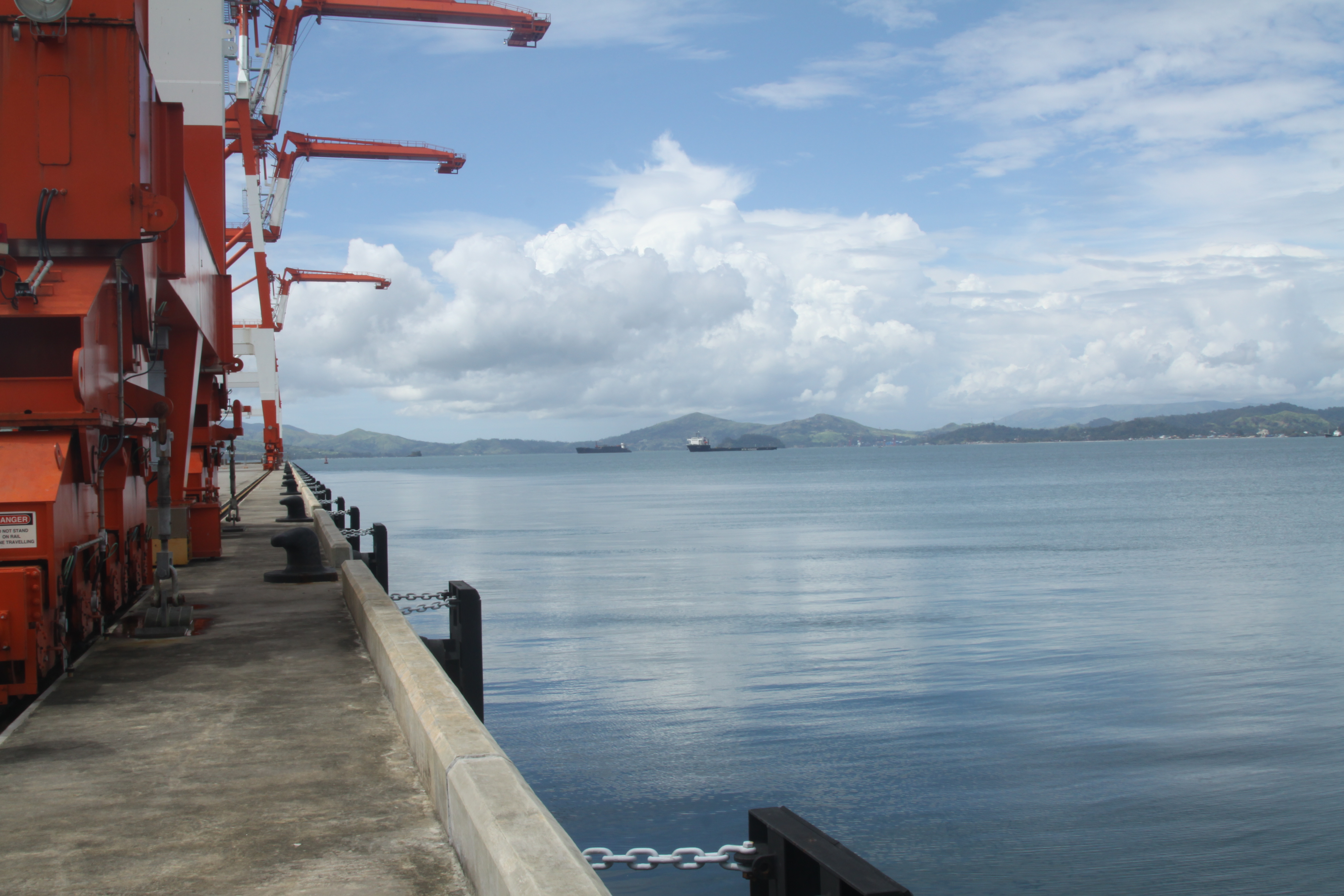
- Interactive map of Port of Subic Bay

Location
- Country: Philippines
- Location: Subic Bay Freeport, Olongapo City
- Coordinates: 14°48′27.7″N 120°17′03.3″E
- UN/LOCODE: PHSFS

Details
- Operated by: Subic Bay Metropolitan Authority
- No. of berths: 25
- Draft depth: 13.7m draft

Statistics
- Website ship.mysubicbay.com.ph

The Port of Subic Bay or the Port of Olongapo is a seaport located in Olongapo City, Philippines. it also was the location of the former U.S. Naval Base Subic Bay. It is one of the busiest, largest, historical and most important of ports in the Philippines. The Port is operated and managed by the Subic Bay Metropolitan Authority (SBMA).

The port has a capacity to handle 600,000 twenty-foot equivalent unit containers (TEUs) and in 2016 handled less than 200,000 TEU containers.

== Description ==
Subic Bay is part of Luzon Sea on the west coast of the island of Luzon in Zambales, Philippines, about 100 kilometers northwest of Manila Bay. Formerly the U.S. Naval Base Subic Bay, it is now the location of the Subic Bay Freeport Zone (SBFZ) in Olongapo City, it is managed by the Subic Bay Metropolitan Authority (SBMA). The bay is surrounded by the town of Subic and Olongapo City, both in the province of Zambales and the town of Morong in the province of Bataan in the east. The mountain ranges around the bay area and the deep natural harbor provide a protected anchorage, naturally sheltered from typhoons. The harbor is up to 13.7 meters covering a total area of 41 hectares.

The Port of Subic Bay is one of the Philippines and South East Asia's major seaports. The Port continues to be one of the country's major economic engines with more than 700 investment projects, including the 4th largest shipbuilding facility in the world owned by Hanjin Heavy Industries and Construction (HHIC). It is connected with the Clark Special Economic Zone, the former Clark Air Force Base in Angeles City via the 45-kilometer Subic-Clark Toll Road.

The port has a total of 12 piers and wharves and presently has three container terminals, a fertilizer terminal at the Boton Wharf, a grain bulk terminal at the Leyte Wharf, and a general containerized cargo terminal at the Sattler Pier. A new container terminal with two berths is now being constructed through the Subic Bay Port Development Project (SBPDP). The two new berths has a total capacity of 300,000 TEUs each, large enough accommodate Panamax and post-Panamax container vessels.

== History ==
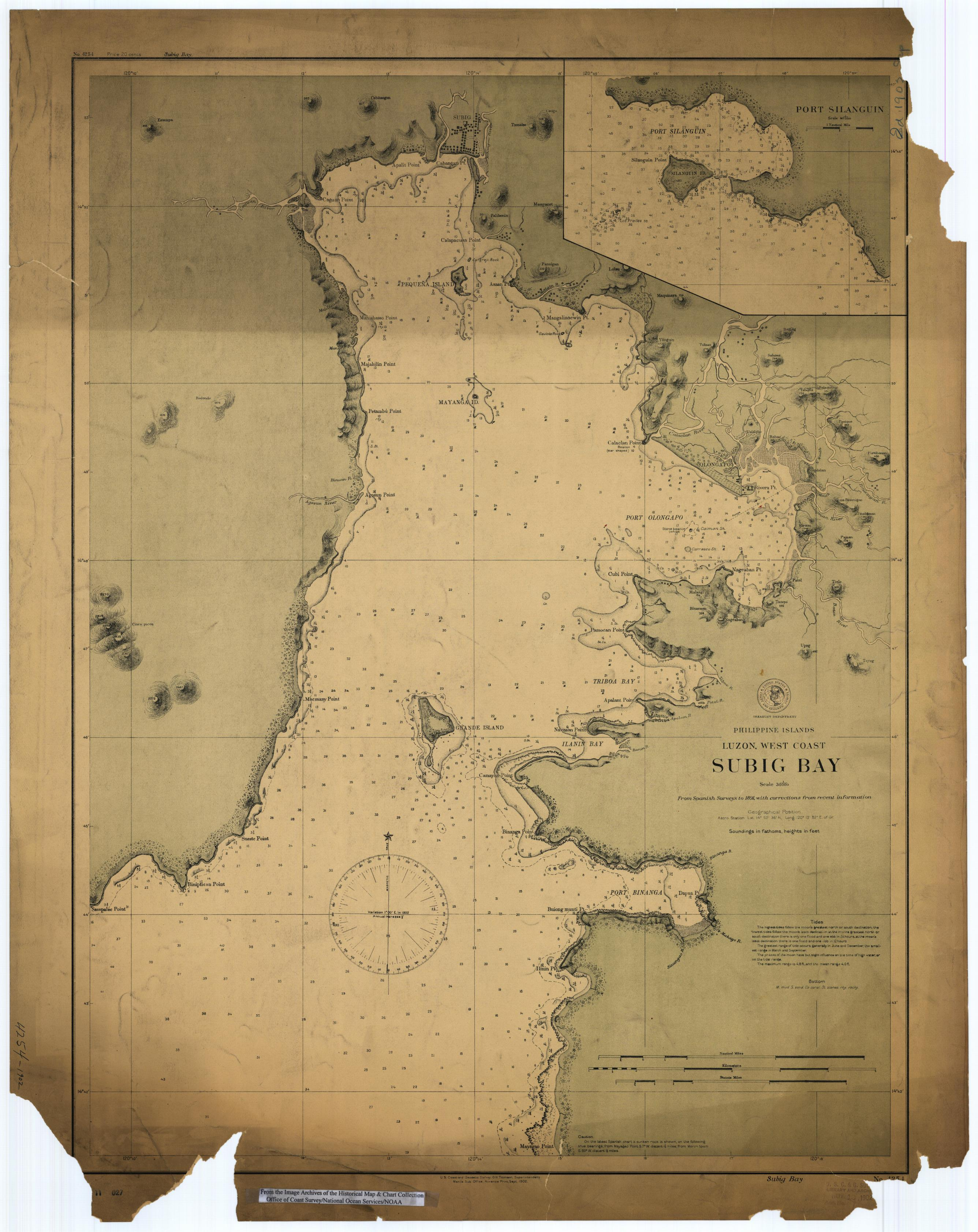
A 1902 nautical chart of Subic Bay

=== Spanish period ===
Subic Bay's strategic location, sheltered anchorages, and deep water were first made known to the Europeans when the Mexico-born Spanish explorer Juan de Salcedo reported its existence to the Spanish authorities upon his return to Manila, after Salcedo arrived in Zambales to establish the Spanish crown, but it would be a number of years before the Spanish would consider establishing a base there.

Cavite, which had been home to most of the Spanish fleet in the Philippines, suffered from unhealthy living conditions and was vulnerable in time of war and bad weather because of its shallow water and lack of shelter. Because of these, a military expedition was sent to Subic Bay in 1868 with orders to survey the bay to find out if it would be a suitable site for a naval yard. The Spanish explored the entire bay and concluded that it had much promise and thus reported their findings to Cavite. This report was not well-accepted in Manila as the Spanish command was reluctant to move to the provincial isolation of Subic Bay. Finally, in 1884, a Royal Decree declared Subic Bay as a naval port.

On March 8, 1885, the Spanish Navy authorized construction of the Arsenal de Olongapo and by the following September, Filipino laborers were working off their taxes by working at Olongapo. To begin, the Filipinos dredged the harbor and its inner basin and built a drainage canal as the Spanish were planning to make Olongapo and their navy yard an "island." This canal also serves as a line of defense over which the bridge at the base's Main Gate passes. When the Arsenal was finished, the Caviteño, the Santa Ana, and the San Quentin, all of which were gunboats, were assigned for its defense. To complement these gunboats, coastal artilleries were planned for the east and west ends of the station, as well as on Grande Island.

Seawalls, causeways and a short railway were built across the swampy tidal flats. To finish these projects, the Filipinos had to remove thousands of tons of dirt and rock from Kalalake in Olongapo to use as fill. The magnitude of this quarrying was so huge that a hill eventually disappeared and became a lagoon in the area now known as Bicentennial Park.

Inside the Arsenal, the Spanish constructed a foundry, as well as other shops, which were necessary for the construction and repair of ships. The buildings were laid out in two rows on Rivera Point, a sandy patch of land jutting into the bay, and named after the incumbent Captain-General of the Philippines, Fernando Primo de Rivera. The Arsenal's showpiece was the station commandant's headquarters, which was a one-storey building of molave and narra, and stood near today's Alava Pier and had colored glass windows.

The Spanish navy yard was constructed in the area. During the Philippine Revolution, the Cuban-Filipino Vicente Catalan and his fleet in the nascent Philippine Navy, seized Olongapo from the Spanish and delivered it to the First Philippine Republic. Upon American invasion, it was occupied by the U.S. Naval Ship Repair Facility.

=== The Battle of Manila Bay ===
On April 25, 1898, Commodore George Dewey, Commander of the U.S. Asiatic Fleet, received word that war with Spain had been declared and was ordered to leave Hong Kong and attack the Spanish fleet in Manila Bay.

In the Philippines, Rear Admiral Patricio Montojo, realizing that Subic Bay would provide a more defensible position than Cavite, ordered his smaller ships and the batteries in Manila Bay to resist Dewey's fleet and deny them the entrance to Manila Bay. His other units would then use Subic Bay as a sally port, with which he could attack the American fleet's rear and cut off its supplies. On the April 26, Montojo arrived at Subic Bay aboard the Reina Christina, with seven other ships.

On the morning of the April 27, the Castilla was towed northeast of Grande Island to help control the western entrance to Subic Bay. The eastern entrance, which was between Grande and Chiquita Islands, had been blocked by the scuttling of the San Quentin and two other vessels. On Grande Island, the four six-inch (15.2 cm) guns that had been shipped from Sangley Point were not yet installed. Meanwhile, a cable-laying ship, which was commandeered to lay mines ended up putting only four of the 15 available mines in place.

In Hong Kong, Dewey purposely delayed his sailing until he received news from the U.S. Consul at Manila, Oscar F. Williams, about information about the strength and positions of the Spanish fleet. Williams told Dewey that Montojo and his fleet had sailed to Subic Bay.

On April 30, Dewey sighted the islands of Luzon and thus ordered the Boston and the Concord to sail at full speed to Subic Bay to hunt for enemy ships. After seeing no enemy vessels at Subic, the Boston and the Concord signaled the Olympia of their findings and rejoined the squadron underway to Manila.

Dawn of May 1, 1898, the American fleet entered Manila Bay and once the ships closed to within 5,000 yards (4,600 m) of the Spanish fleet, Dewey ordered the Captain of the Olympia to fire when ready. Montojo's fleet was totally destroyed, losing 167 men and wounding 214. The Americans only suffered a handful of injuries and no casualties.

=== American Colonial Period ===
The U.S. Naval Base Subic Bay was a major ship-repair, supply, and rest and recreation facility of the United States Navy located in Olongapo City, Philippines. It was the largest U.S. Navy installation in the Pacific and was the largest overseas military installation of the United States Armed Forces after Clark Air Base in Angeles City was closed in 1991.

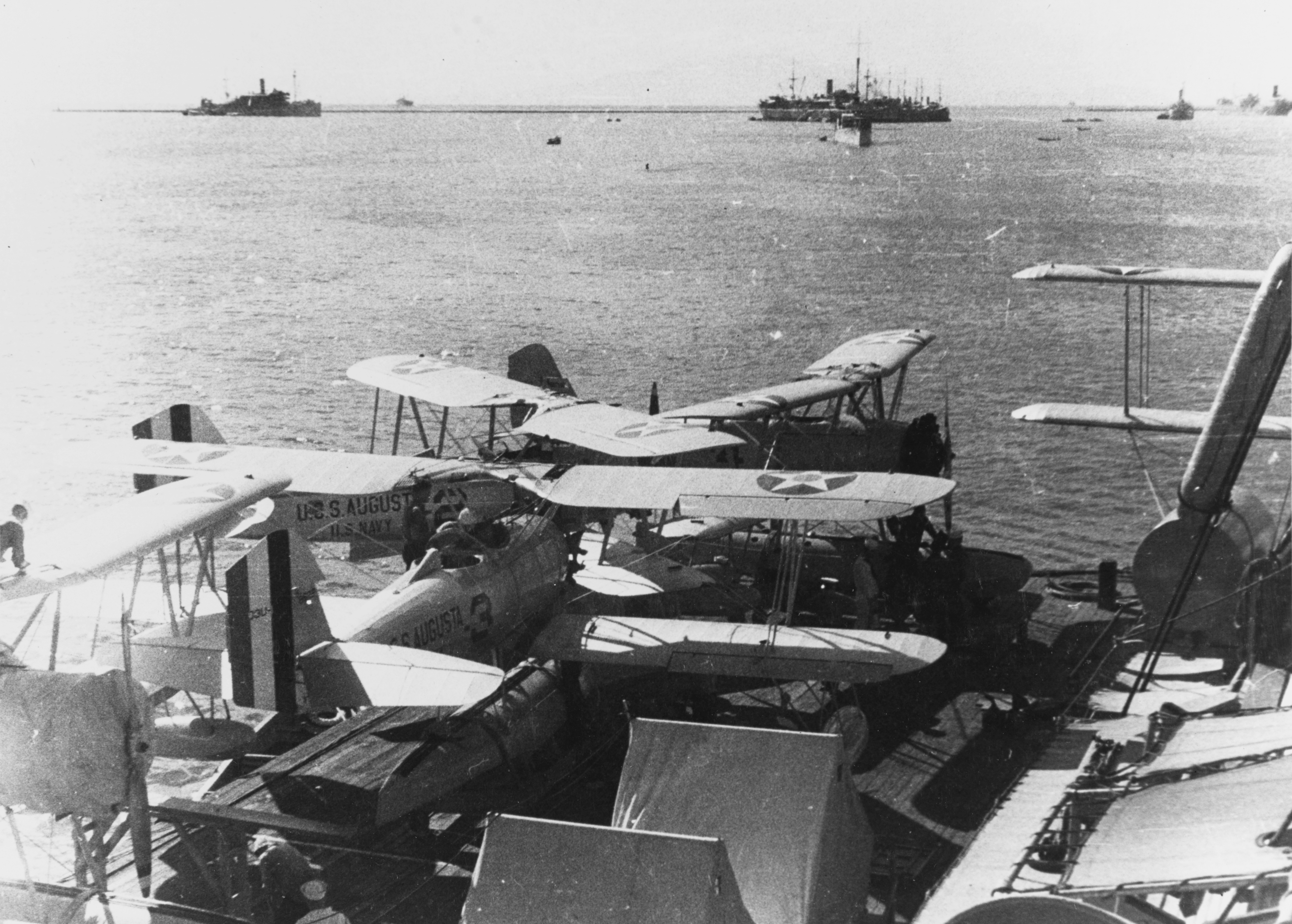
1933: Vought O3U-1 "Corsair" observation planes aboard the Augusta during exercises in Subic Bay.

In 1917, as the United States was drawn into World War I, all the Navy's shipyards including Subic Bay began working at a feverish pace to prepare ships for sea. American and Filipino workers would take pride in their workmanship such that destroyers that were overhauled in Subic Bay became the vanguard of Admiral William Sims's convoy.

=== World War II ===
By mid-1940, the Nazis had overrun Europe and Japan was beginning to flex its military muscle. The United States Congress therefore authorized the release of funds with which to update the Coast Defenses of Manila and Subic Bays. President Franklin D. Roosevelt would complement this by ordering the integration of Filipino military forces into the newly created U.S. Army Forces in the Far East. General Douglas MacArthur, who had been serving as a military advisor to the government of the Commonwealth of the Philippines and was also Field Marshal of the Philippines, was ordered back to active duty with the rank of Lieutenant General with the title of Commander of the United States Forces in the Philippines and the Philippine Army.

To prepare for eventual war, Dewey Drydock, which had been at Subic Bay for 35 years was towed to Mariveles Bay, on the tip of the Bataan Peninsula, and scuttled there on April 8, 1941, to prevent the Japanese from deriving benefit from it.

The freshly arrived Marines were assigned to provide land defense for Subic Bay. Seaward defenses included the batteries at Fort Wint on Grande Island and a minefield, which had been laid off the entrance to Subic Harbor. As the Marines built beach defenses, Consolidated PBY-4 Catalinas from VP-101 & VP-102 of Patrol Wing 10, which was stationed at Subic Bay, were conducting daily patrols off Luzon as a response to rumors that the Japanese were approaching the Philippines. On December 11, seven Catalinas had just returned from patrol when Japanese Zeroes appeared and strafed the aircraft. One ensign was killed and all Catalinas sank to the bottom of Subic Bay's inner basin.

By December 24, the situation at Olongapo had become hopeless and an order to destroy the station and withdraw was given. All buildings on the station were torched while Filipinos burned the entire town of Olongapo. All that remained on Subic Bay was the former New York, and she was towed into a deep part of the bay and scuttled. All Marines withdrew to Bataan and eventually to Corregidor where they made their last stand.

Fort Wint, under the command of Colonel Napoleon Boudreau of the U.S. Army, was evacuated on December 25. All equipment and supplies were destroyed. On January 10, 1942, soldiers of the Japanese Imperial Army's 14th Infantry Division marched into Olongapo and on the 12th, the Japanese commandeered native fishing boats to seize Grande Island. Olongapo Naval Station was established with four companies of soldiers and a company of Kempeitai.

By January 1945, the Japanese had all but abandoned Subic Bay. The U.S. Fifth Air Force had dropped 175 tons of bombs on Grande Island evoking only light fire from the skeleton Japanese force manning the anti-aircraft guns. The commander of Japanese forces in the Philippines, General Tomoyuki Yamashita, had withdrawn his forces into defensive mountain positions and ordered Colonel Sanenbou Nagayoshi to block Highway 7 near Subic Bay.

=== The Vietnam War ===
The base became the service station and supermarket for the U.S. Seventh Fleet after the Gulf of Tonkin incident in 1964. From an average of 98 ship visits a month in 1964, the average shot up to 215 by 1967, with about 30 ships in port on any given day. A new record was set in October 1968 with 47 ships in port.

The Naval Supply Depot (NSD) handled the largest volume of fuel oil of any Navy facility in the world, with more than 4 million barrels (640,000 m^{3}) of fuel oil processed each month. An offshore fueling terminal began operation in September 1967, allowing commercial tankers to unload fuel oil and aviation gas without docking at the busy fuel pier. The depot also supplied Clark Air Base with aviation fuel through a 41-mile (66 km) pipeline. In addition to its fuel operations, NSD also stocked over 200,000 various items for use by the fleet. In June 1968 a fire of unknown origin destroyed a warehouse with the loss of 18,000 line items worth more than $10 million.

NAS Cubi Point served as the primary maintenance, repair and supply center for the 400 carrier based aircraft of the Seventh Fleet's carrier force. The jet engine shop turned out two jet engines a day to keep pace with the demands of the air war in Vietnam.

=== US withdrawal ===
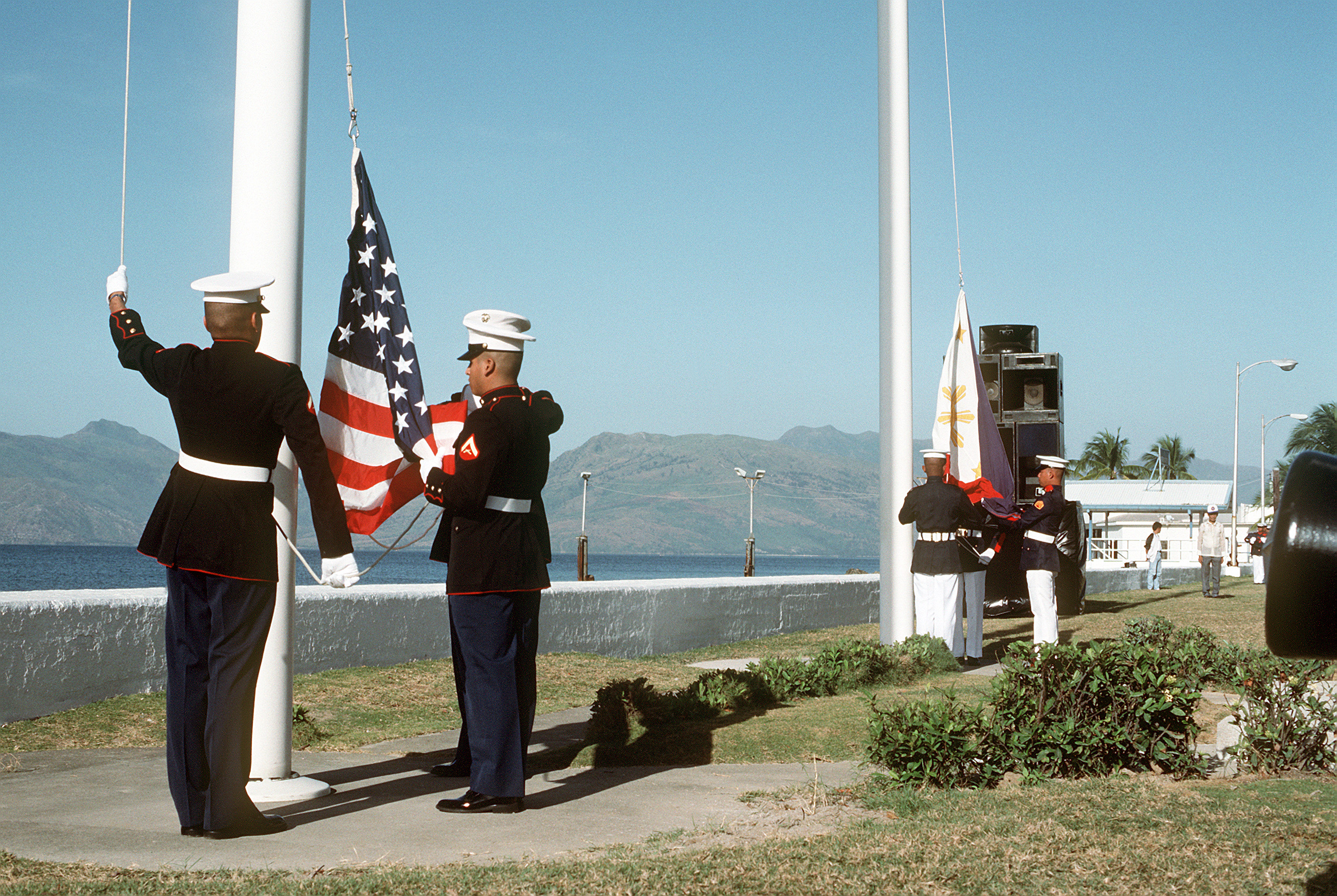
The American Flag is lowered and Philippine flag is raised during turnover of Naval Station Subic Bay.

In December 1991, the two governments were again in talks to extend the withdrawal of American forces for three years but this broke down as the United States refused to spell out in detail their withdrawal plans or say if nuclear weapons were kept on base; nuclear weapons were forbidden on Philippine soil. Finally, on December 27, President Corazon Aquino, who fought to delay the pullout to cushion the country's battered economy, issued a formal notice for the U.S. to leave what had been the U.S.'s largest overseas defense facility after Clark Air Base was closed, by the end of 1992.

During 1992, tons of material including drydocks and equipment, were shipped to various Naval Stations. Ship-repair and maintenance yards as well as supply depots were relocated to other Asian countries including Japan and Singapore. Finally, on November 24, 1992, the American Flag was lowered in Subic Bay for the last time and the last 1,416 Sailors and Marines at Subic Bay Naval Base left by plane from NAS Cubi Point and by the USS Belleau Wood. This withdrawal marked the first time since the 16th Century that no foreign military forces were present in the Philippines.

=== 21st century; U.S.-China tensions ===
In 1992, the Philippine national government set up a special economic zone encompassing the port and its surroundings that were within Olongapo City limits but were not under the supervision of the Olongapo City Hall; the resulting Subic Bay Freeport Zone was owned and under a specialized management by a state-owned enterprise known as the Subic Bay Metropolitan Authority. The Philippine Ports Authority took partial control of the port in 2007. The port's operations were contracted out to Philippine private investment firm International Container Terminal Services (ICTSI) that year.

In March 2022, the nearby Agila Subic Shipyard was acquired by the American private equity firm Cerberus Capital Management, after the previous owners, South Korean shipping company Hanjin went bankrupt, amid concerns about rising tensions between the U.S. and China. The Port itself remained under SBMA and PPA ownership.

== Wharves and piers ==
Port of Subic Bay
1 Alava Wharf
2 Bravo Wharf
3 Rivera Wharf
4 Sattler Pier
5 Marine Terminal
6 POL Pier
7 Boton Wharf
8 Leyte Pier
9 New Container Terminals (NCTs)
10 Nabasan Wharf
- Wharves
  - Alava Wharf (under operation of Global Terminals & Development Inc.)
  - Bravo Wharf (under operation of Subic Drydock)
  - Rivera Wharf
  - Boton Wharf
  - Nabasan Wharf
  - Camayan Wharf (Ocean Adventure)
- Piers
  - Sattler Pier (Naval Supply Depot)
  - Leyte Pier (under operation of Subic Bay Grain Terminal Inc.)
  - POL Pier (under the operation of Philippine Coastal Petroleum)
  - Marine Terminal (Naval Supply Depot)
  - New Container Terminal (NCT) 1 and 2
- Ferry Terminals
  - Grande Island Ferry Terminal
  - Hanjin Subic Shipyard Ferry Terminal

Additionally, the Port of Subic Bay serves as a yacht docking under Subic Bay Yacht Club (SBYC).

== See also ==
- Agila Subic Shipyard
- List of East Asian ports
