= Subic Special Economic and Freeport Zone =

Subic Subic Bay
- Freeport and special economic zone
- Subic Special Economic and Freeport Zone
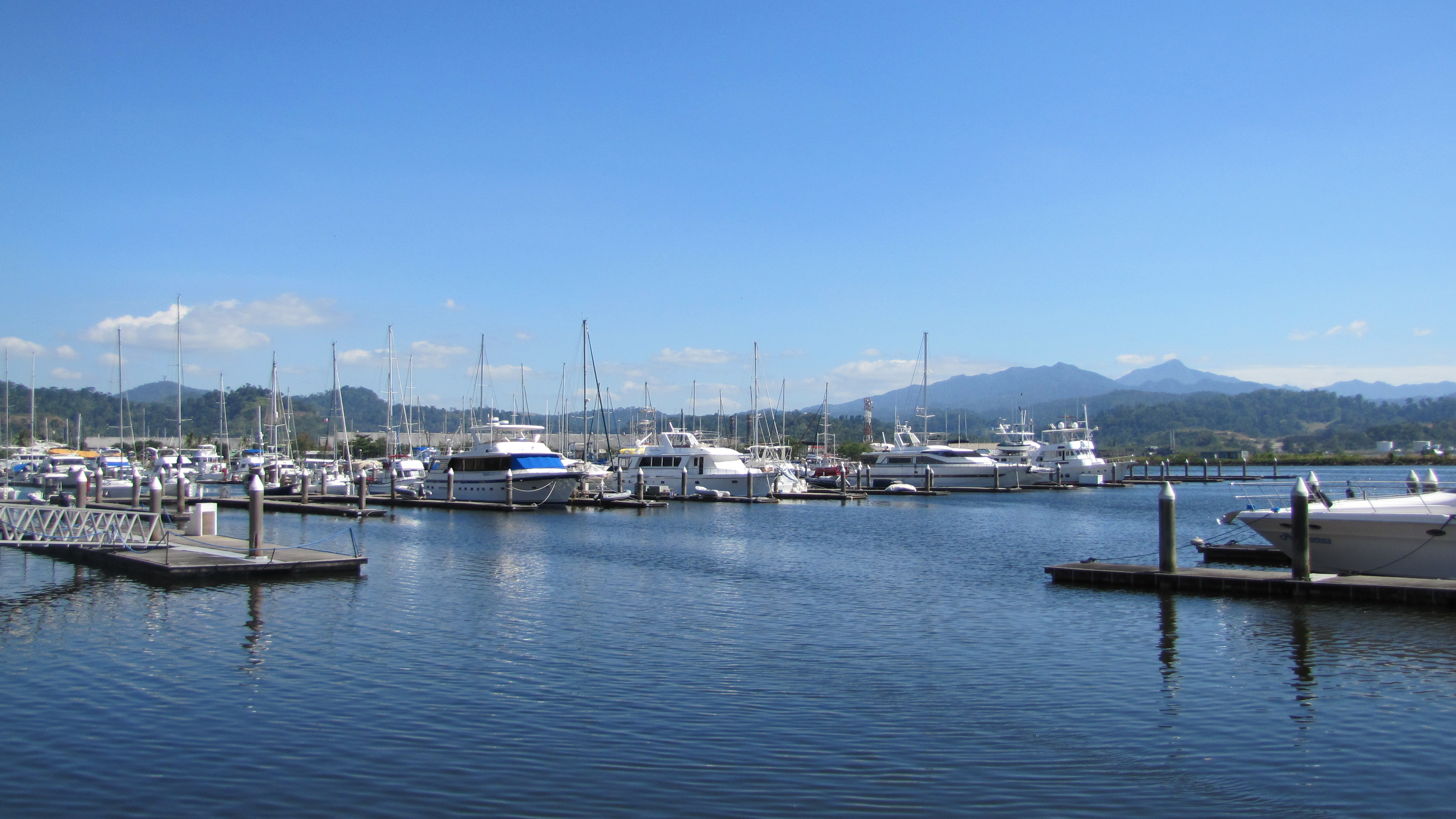
- Subic Bay Yacht Club

- Location of Subic in Bataan and Zambales
- Interactive map of Subic
- Location within the Philippines Subic (Luzon)
- Coordinates: 14.807°N 120.287°E
- Country: Philippines
- Region: Central Luzon
- Provinces: Bataan and Zambales
- City and municipalities: Bataan: Hermosa; Morong; Zambales: Olongapo; Subic
- Established: March 13, 1992

Government
  - Chairperson and administrator: Eduardo Aliño
- ZIP code: 2222
- IDD : area code: +63 47
- Catholic diocese: Diocese of Balanga (Hermosa and Morong, Bataan); Diocese of Iba (Olongapo and Subic, Zambales)
- Website: mysubicbay.com.ph

The Subic Special Economic and Freeport Zone, often shortened as Subic Bay or Subic, is a special economic zone and freeport area covering portions of the city of Olongapo and the town of Subic in Zambales, and the towns of Hermosa and Morong in Bataan in the Philippines. The relatively developed and fenced area is called the Subic Bay Freeport Zone (SBFZ).

The economic zone was the location of U.S. Naval Base Subic Bay, until the latter's decommissioning in 1992. The SBFZ is operated and managed by the Subic Bay Metropolitan Authority (SBMA). The harbor faces the Zambales Mountains to the west and Subic Bay opens to the South China Sea.

== History ==
Subic Bay is surrounded by the towns of Hermosa, Morong, and Subic, and the city of Olongapo in the provinces of Bataan and Zambales, respectively. The Spanish built a shipyard and naval base in Subic bay in the 1800s. During the Philippine Revolution, the Cuban-Filipino Vicente Catalan and his fleet in the nascent Philippine Navy, seized Subic from the Spanish and delivered it to the First Philippine Republic. Afterwards when the Americans invaded, it became an American naval base. The development of Olongapo was largely tied to the presence of the United States Navy base, once the largest U.S. military naval base in Asia. An arsenal and ship-repair facility was established at Subic Bay in 1885 by the then colonial power, Spain. Following the Spanish–American War, Subic Bay became a U.S. Navy and Marine base, and grew to be a major facility. Until 1991, it was the base of the United States 7th Fleet. A red-light district developed around the base, drawn by the presence of American personnel.

The Official Logo of the Subic Bay Metropolitan Authority

In early 1991, after the collapse of protracted negotiations, the Philippine Senate rejected terms for renewal of the base's lease. The U.S. Navy was already in the process of downsizing its Subic Bay operations in June 1991, when Mount Pinatubo erupted. One of the largest volcanic eruptions in the last 100 years, it covered the Navy Base in volcanic ash and collapsed a significant number of structures.

On March 13, 1992, the Philippine Congress passed Republic Act 7227, known as the Bases Conversion and Development Act of 1992, in anticipation of the pullout of the US military bases in the country. Section 13 of Republic Act No. 7227 converted Subic Bay Naval Base into Subic Special Economic and Freeport Zone and created the Subic Bay Metropolitan Authority (SBMA) to develop and manage the Freeport which provides tax and duty-free privileges and incentives to business locators in the special economic zone.

Richard Gordon, then the mayor of the City of Olongapo, became the first SBMA chairman.

The last ship, USS Belleau Wood, left on November 24, 1992.

=== Post–Cold War ===
Subic Bay was converted into a commercial zone largely through the efforts of some 8,000 residents of nearby Olongapo, under the leadership of mayor Richard Gordon, who wanted to protect and preserve the $8 billion worth of facilities and property from looting and destruction. Subic was transformed and became a model for bases conversion into commercial use after the Cold War with blue chip companies like Coastal Petroleum and Fed Ex pumping in over $3 billion of investments, creating 70,000 jobs in the free port's first four years. It was host to the 4th APEC Leaders' Summit on November 24, 1996 and FedEx's Asia-Pacific hub, Asia-One, was located in Subic Bay for almost ten years.

In 2013, Defense Secretary Voltaire Gazmin said that the Philippines intended to move military forces to the base in response to the territorial disputes in the South China Sea. The United States Navy sought access on a rotational basis for ships and Marines, and conducts maritime patrol aircraft patrols from bases in the Philippines.

Due to its strategic location at the Luzon Economic Corridor, the US has vowed to support the development of a freight railway connecting Subic, Clark, Manila and Batangas. The project aims to improve logistics between the major economic zones of Luzon, as well as to decongest the Manila port.

== Geography ==
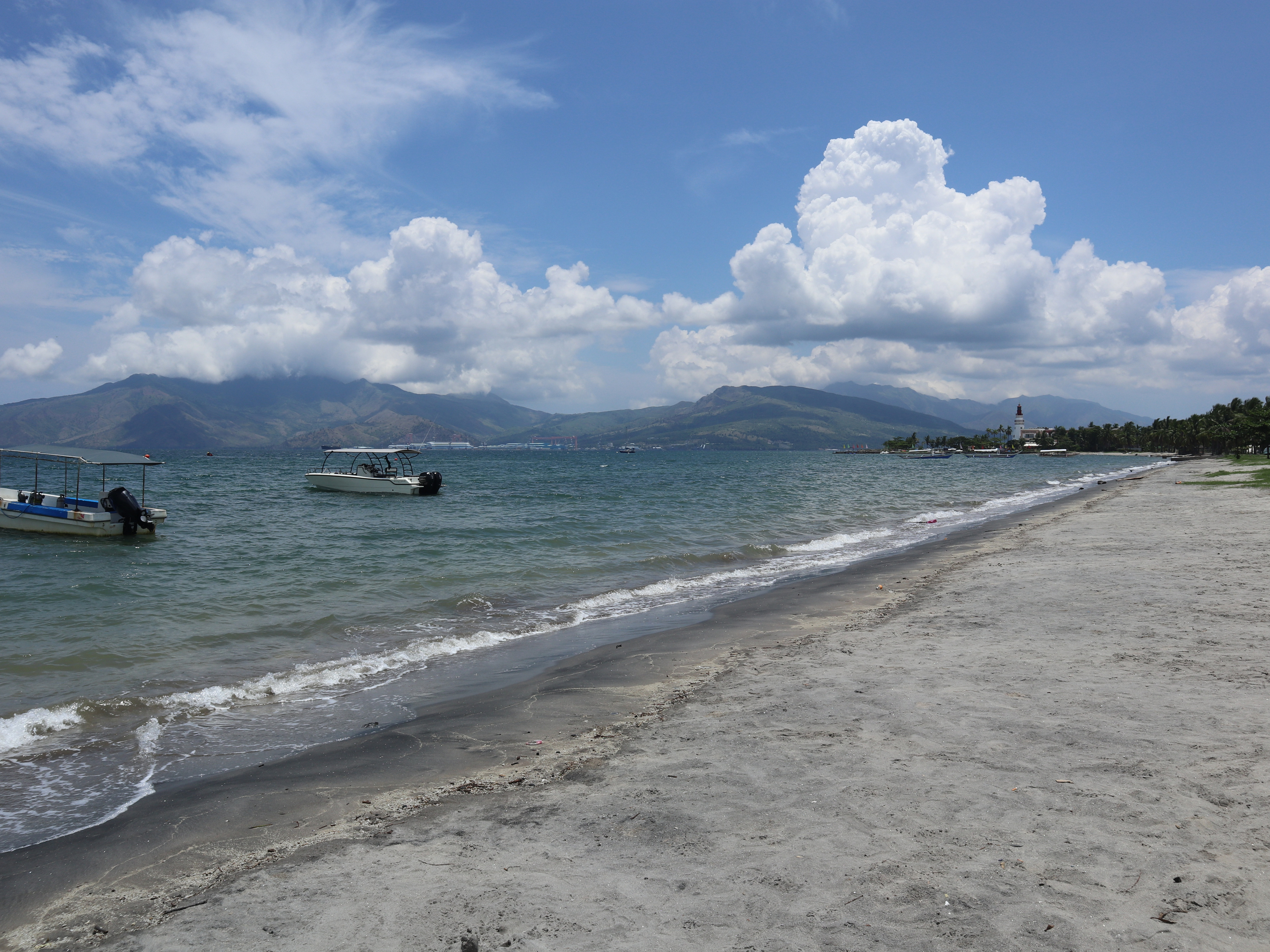
SBMA Beach

While the Subic Special Economic and Freeport Zone (as well as the agency responsible for the freeport zone's operations and management Subic Bay Metropolitan Authority (SBMA)) shares a name with a nearby town, it covers portions of Olongapo and the town of Subic in Zambales, and Hermosa and Morong in Bataan, with Subic portion of the zone being an exclave. It covers a total area of 67,452 hectares (166,680 acres), but the 14,000 hectares (35,000 acres) area that is secured and fenced hosts much of the development. This area is referred to as the Subic Bay Freeport Zone and out of this area 2,800 hectares (6,900 acres) is suitable for development, with the remaining portions consisting of high slopes, forests, or protected areas. In 2017, negotiations with local government units next to the Subic Bay Freeport Zone expanded the fenced area.

The special economic zone is adjacent to Subic Bay. At least six mangrove areas are found in the Freeport Zone.

=== Districts ===
The Subic Freeport Zone is divided into districts. The freeport zone has a Certificate of Ancestral Domain Title (CADT) Land, which is the ancestral domain of the Aeta people.

- Binictican Heights
- Central Business District (CBD)
- Cubi-Triboa
- Ilanin Forest East
- Ilanin Forest West
- Kalayaan Heights
- Port District
- Redondo Peninsula
- Subic Bay Forest District (consisting of the non-adjacent areas of Tipo and Minanga areas)
- Subic Gateway

== Demographics ==
Subic Freeport's population of at least 6,000 people is concentrated in the Kalayaan and Binictican areas. Portions of the Subic Freeport area form part of a formally recognized ancestral domain of the Aetas, an indigenous ethnic group living in the area prior to its usage as a US military base. A significant Aeta settlement in Subic is Pastolan.

== Economy ==
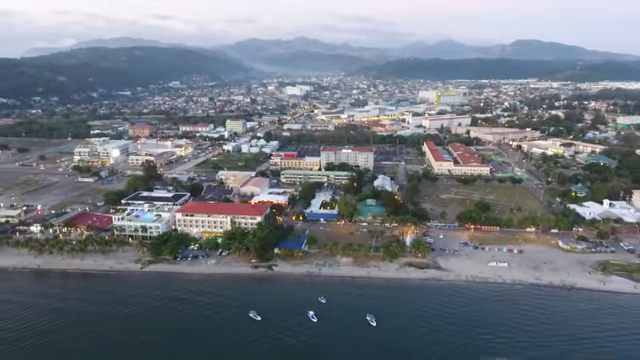
Subic Freeport business district in Olongapo.

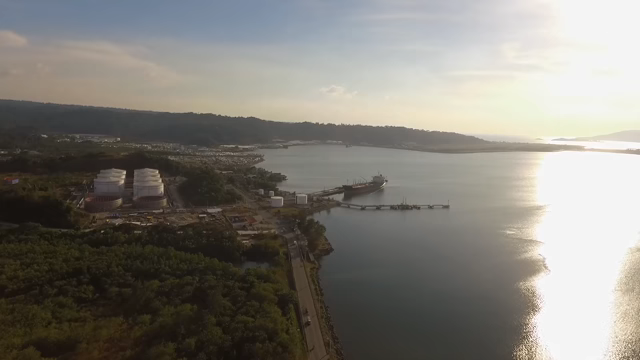
Gas depot in Boton area.

As of 2025, approximately 171,653 workers were employed in Subic Bay Freeport, 67% in the service industry and 22% in the manufacturing industry. Subic was a shipbuilding hub. The now-defunct Hanjin Philippines was the single biggest employer in the area prior to its bankruptcy in January 2019. As of 2024, around 6,187 workers were employed in the shipbuilding and maritime industry by 153 companies. Subic is served by the Port of Subic.

=== Tourism ===
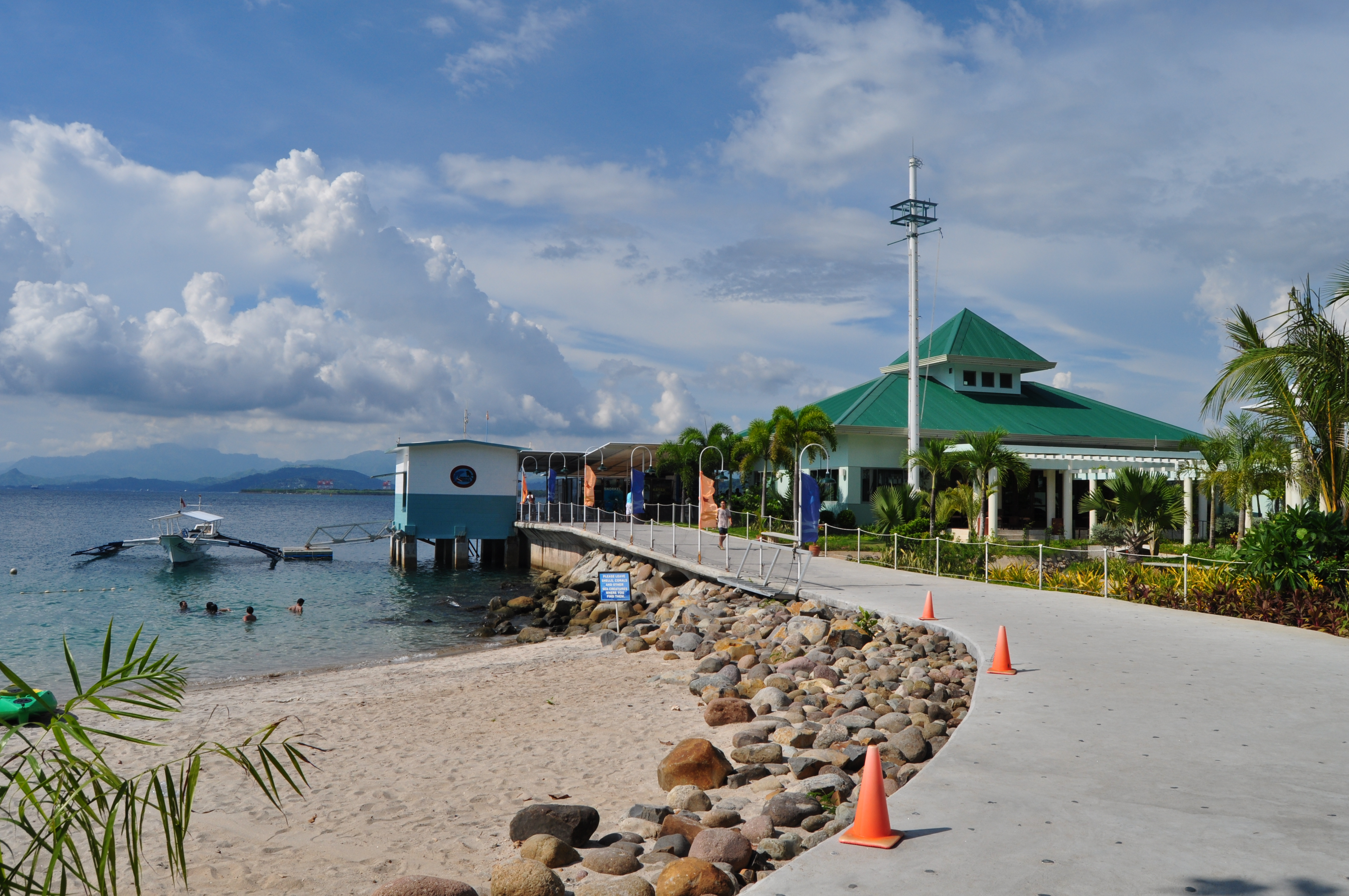
Camayan Beach Resort in Morong, Bataan.

Subic Bay is a popular destination for weekend visitors from Metro Manila. Attractions include beaches, an underwater aquarium, jungle survival tours, and duty-free shopping.

Destinations include eco-tourism theme parks, the Ocean Adventure, Zoobic Safari, and the Pamulaklakin Nature Park, which is home to the indigenous Aetas who once trained the U.S. Navy in jungle survival tactics.

Subic International Raceway (SIR), the Philippines' first purpose-built motorsports venue, opened in 1994 near Subic Bay International Airport. It was established by racing champion Pocholo Ramirez and his family. SIR hosted international racing events, such as the Asian Festival of Speed, Asian Formula 2000 and the Asian Formula Three Championship. Local races, such as the Philippine Touring Car Championship, Run What You Brung (RWYB) and Circuit Showdown were held there. The racetrack closed in 2010 after its lease ended.

The economic zone hosts the Subic Bay Yacht Club. The bay is favored for sailing sports, especially during the Habagat season. Subic Bay hosted the sailing events for the 2019 Southeast Asian Games.

The Subic Sun Convention Resort and Casino, will be the first international branded hotel complex in Subic and is set to open in 2025.

=== Transport ===
The Subic Special Economic and Freeport Zone is served by the Subic–Clark–Tarlac Expressway (SCTEX) and Subic–Tipo Expressway. Subic is the site of Subic Bay International Airport which can be used for chartered flights. The airport was a former Asian hub of multinational logistics company FedEx. The Port serves direct passenger traffic through ferries going to and from Orion, Bataan.

The freeport zone is accessible via its gates in Olongapo City from SCTEX and Subic–Tipo Expressway, and Morong from Roman Superhighway and Mariveles–Bagac Road or Old National Road from Pilar, and Gov J.J. Linao Road, UN Avenue and SBMA–Morong Road, serving both as alternative access to Zambales from Bataan through the provincial boundary of both provinces located within the zone's premises aside from Jose Abad Santos Avenue through the Olongapo welcome sign. The latter route also links the older Freeport Area of Bataan (FAB) in Mariveles serving as such between the two freeport zones of Bataan.

=== Industrial parks ===
Most of the businesses in Subic Freeport's industrial parks are manufacturing, construction, and warehousing. These industrial parks are:

- Subic Bay Gateway Park (formerly Subic Bay Industrial Park)
- Subic Techno Park
  - On March 22, 2024, Sanyo Denki Philippines, Inc. Chairman Chihiro Nakayama with President Hirokazu Takeuchi and SBMA Chair, Eduardo L. Aliño led the inauguration ceremony of the P2.3-billion expansion project, phase 4 at the Subic Techno Park. The construction of a fourth factory building will need an additional 1,500 workers to manufacture uninterrupted power supplies, cooling fans, servo amplifiers and stepping motors.
- Global Industrial Park (SRF Compound)
- Tipo HighTech Eco-Park

== See also ==
- Clark Freeport and Special Economic Zone
- Freeport Area of Bataan
