= Ocean Adventure =

- Interactive map of Ocean Adventure
- Location: Subic Freeport Zone, Morong, Bataan, Philippines
- Coordinates: 14°45′52.3″N 120°15′09.9″E
- Status: Operating
- Opened: October 2001; 24 years ago
- Owner: Subic Bay Marine Exploratorium
- Operated by: Subic Bay Marine Exploratorium
- Theme: Marine park
- Attendance: 500,000 (2012)

Attractions
- Shows: Sea lion show; whale presentation
- Website: oceanadventure.ph

Ocean Adventure is an open-space marine zoological park in the Morong, Bataan portion of the Subic Special Economic and Freeport Zone in the Philippines.

== History ==
Ocean Adventure opened to the public in October 2001, with its initial facilities built at a cost of $7.5 million. The marine facility was built at Camayan Point, which formerly hosted a ammunition pier.

In its first year of operations, false killer whale viewing and sea lion shows were among the marine park's attractions. In June 2002, the Subic Bay Marine Exploratorium (SBME), the parent company of Ocean Adventure, secured a 75-year lease with the Subic Bay Metropolitan Authority (SBMA) over Ilanin Bay's shoreline and waters, including Miracle Beach, which increased the area of the Ocean Adventure marine park from 13 acres (5.3 ha) to 27 acres (11 ha).

A dispute has been ongoing between the SBME and the SBMA since the early 2010s. The latter terminated its lease contract with the former, alleging that SBME had violated terms of its lease agreement; violations cited are illegal subleasing of property, constructing without permits, improper waste storage, and closure of public roads. This began when the SBME developed "The Hill", a residential area populated with expatriates.

In 2017, the marine park was named Best Theme Park in the inaugural edition of the United Stars Events and Exhibitions Corp.-organized Philippine Tourism Industry Awards.

The SBMA seized undeveloped portions of land owned by SBME, including land meant for future development of Ocean Adventure, in October 2019. The SBMA sought to repossess Ocean Adventure in 2019, citing multiple contractual violations and failure to complete developmental commitments and asked the SBME to reduce activities within two years.

Operations seized for seven months in 2020, due to the COVID-19 pandemic. Ocean Adventure resumed operations in October 2020.

== Facilities and attractions ==
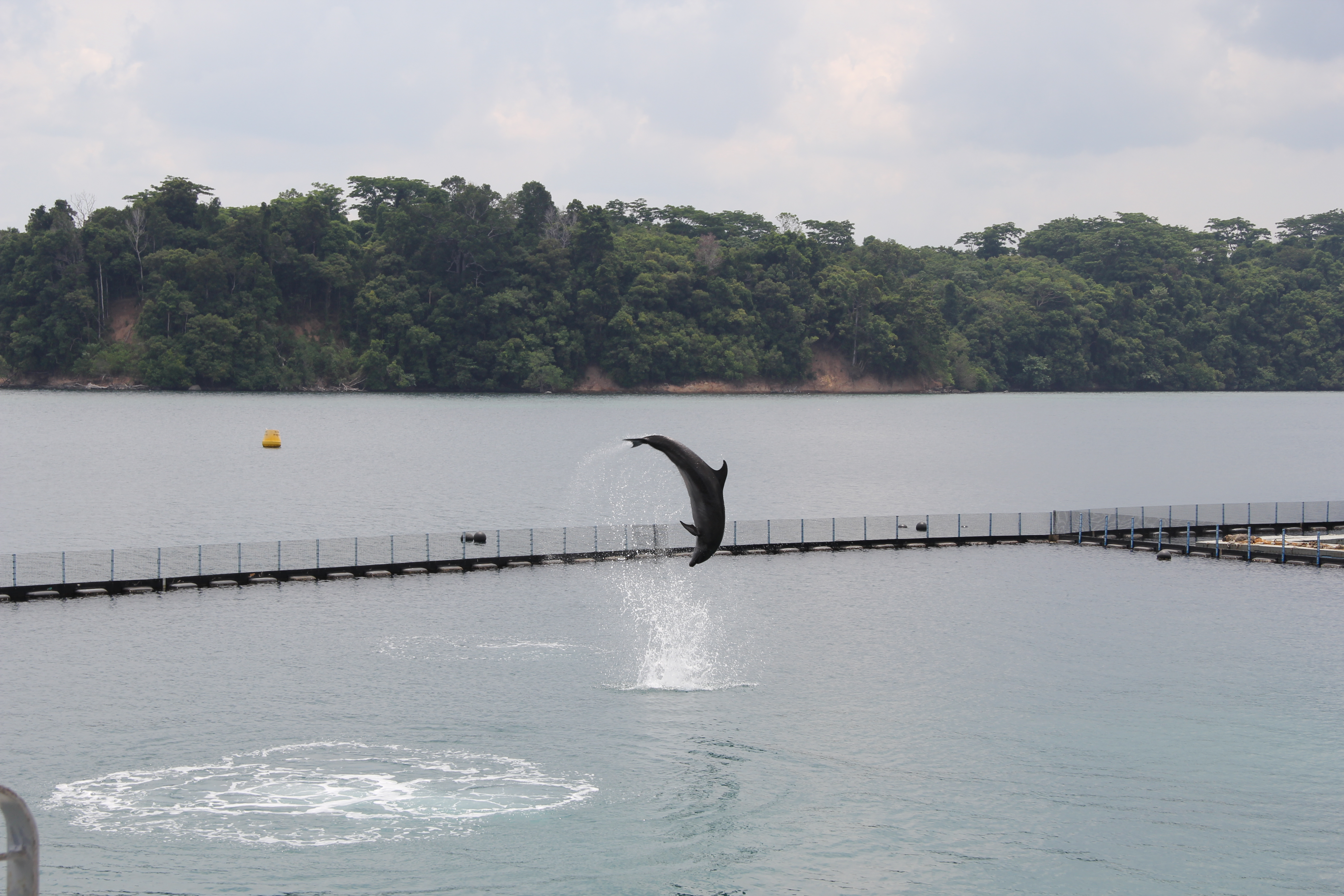
Dolphin show at Ocean Adventure

Ocean Adventure is managed by Subic Bay Marine Exploratorium, Inc., which is a locator in the Subic Special Economic and Freeport Zone and also runs the Camayan Beach Resort and the Adventure Beach Waterpark. The marine park itself is located within the West Ilanin Forest Area in the town of Morong, Bataan portion of the Subic economic zone. The marine park has three primary attractions: the Sea Lion Show, Whale Presentation and Discovery Aquarium.

== Visitors ==
According to data from the Subic Bay Metropolitan Authority in 2012, the marine park receives 500,000 visitors annually, making it one of the top tourist destinations in the Central Luzon region.
