= Morong, Bataan =

Municipality in Bataan, Philippines

Morong
- Municipality
- Municipality of Morong
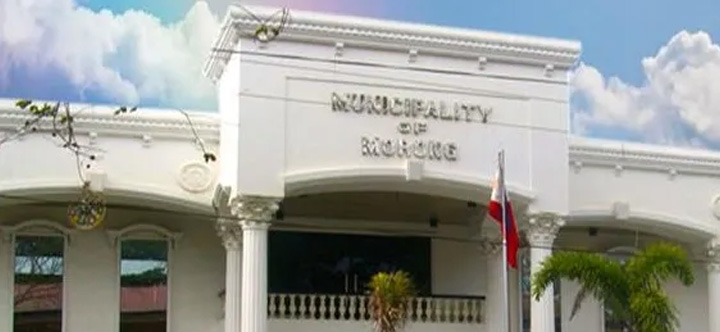
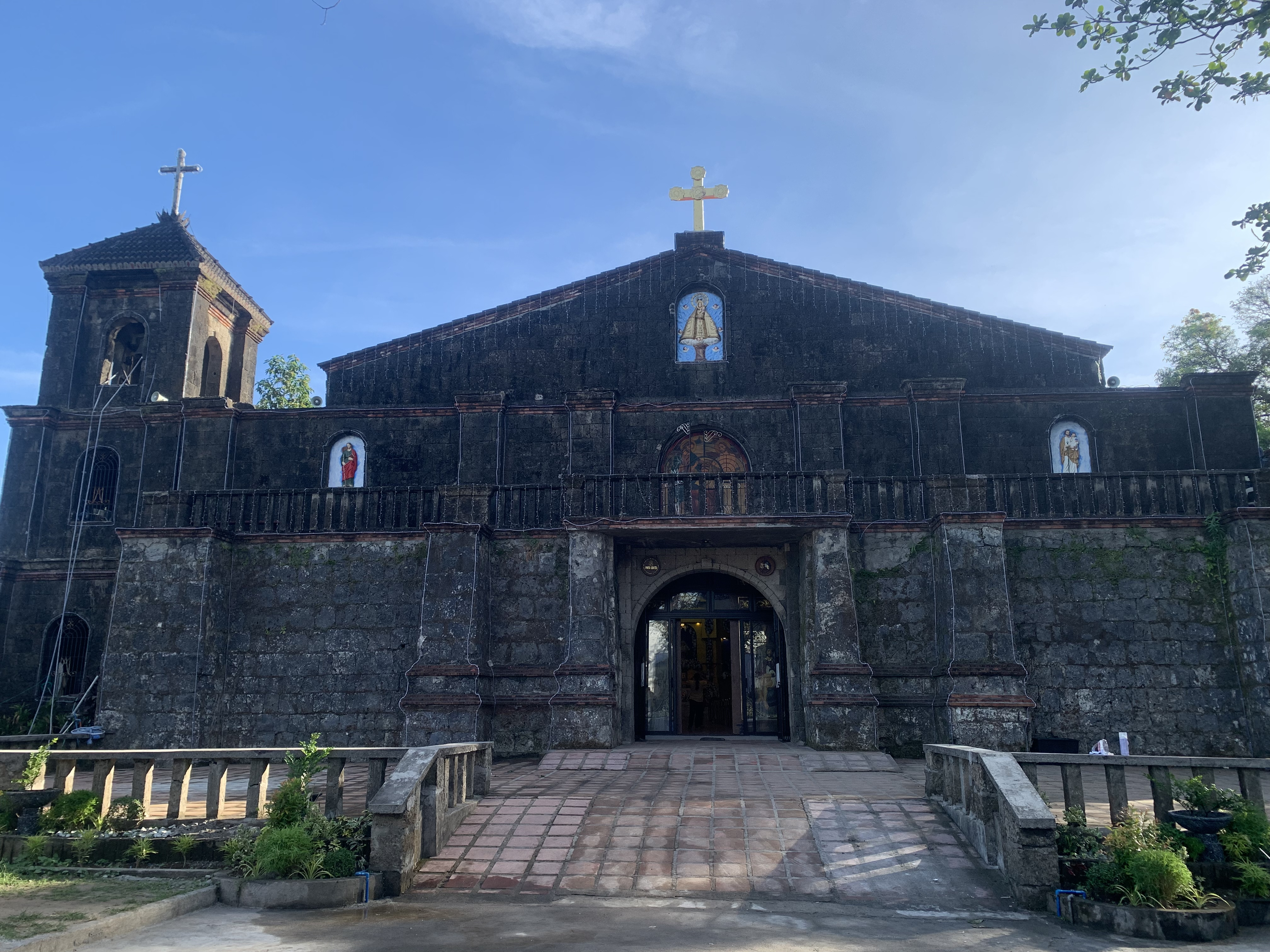
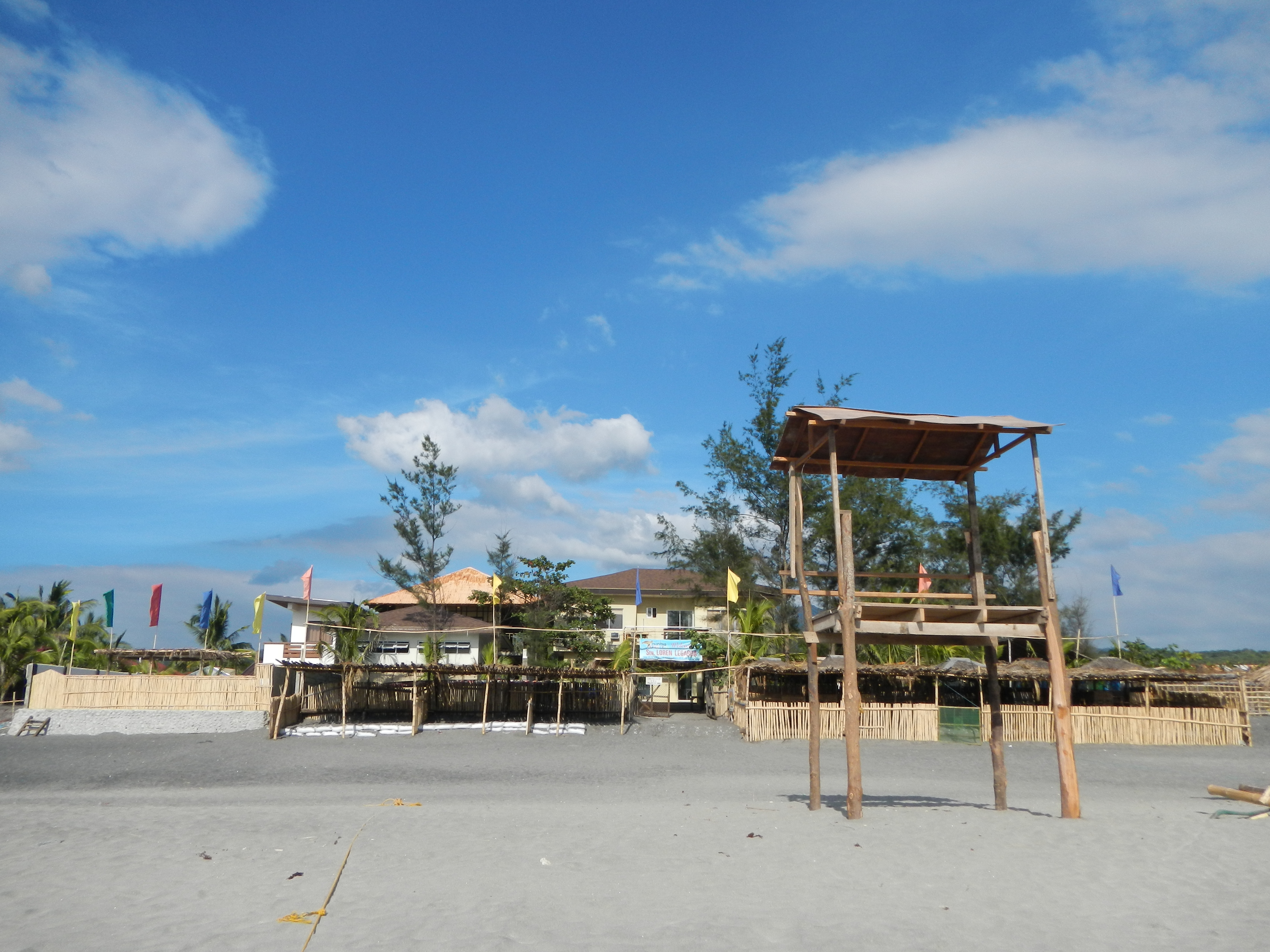
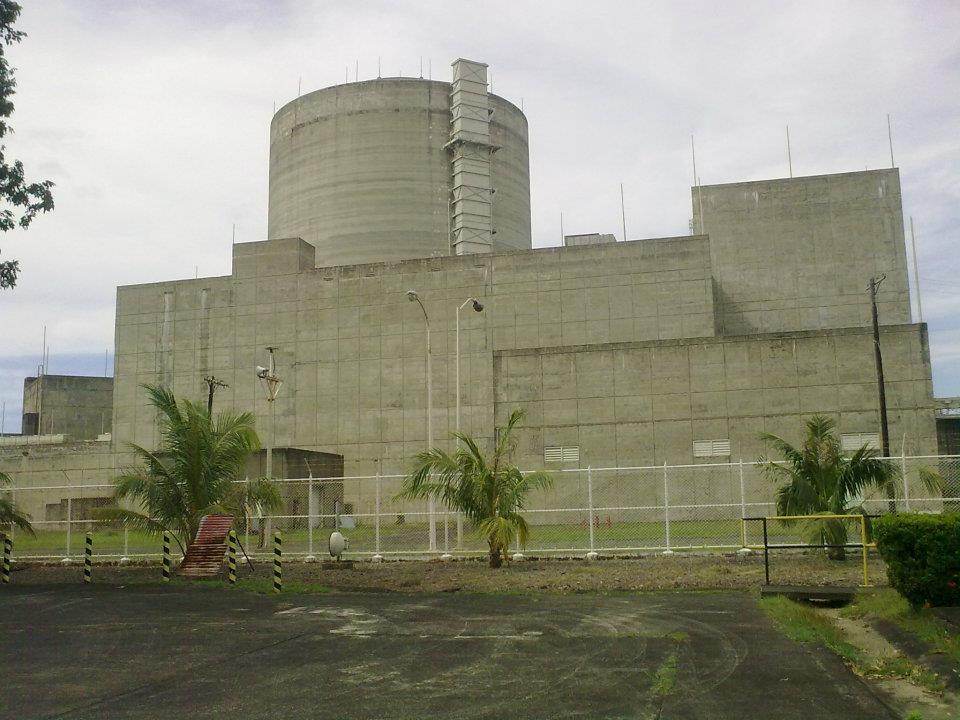
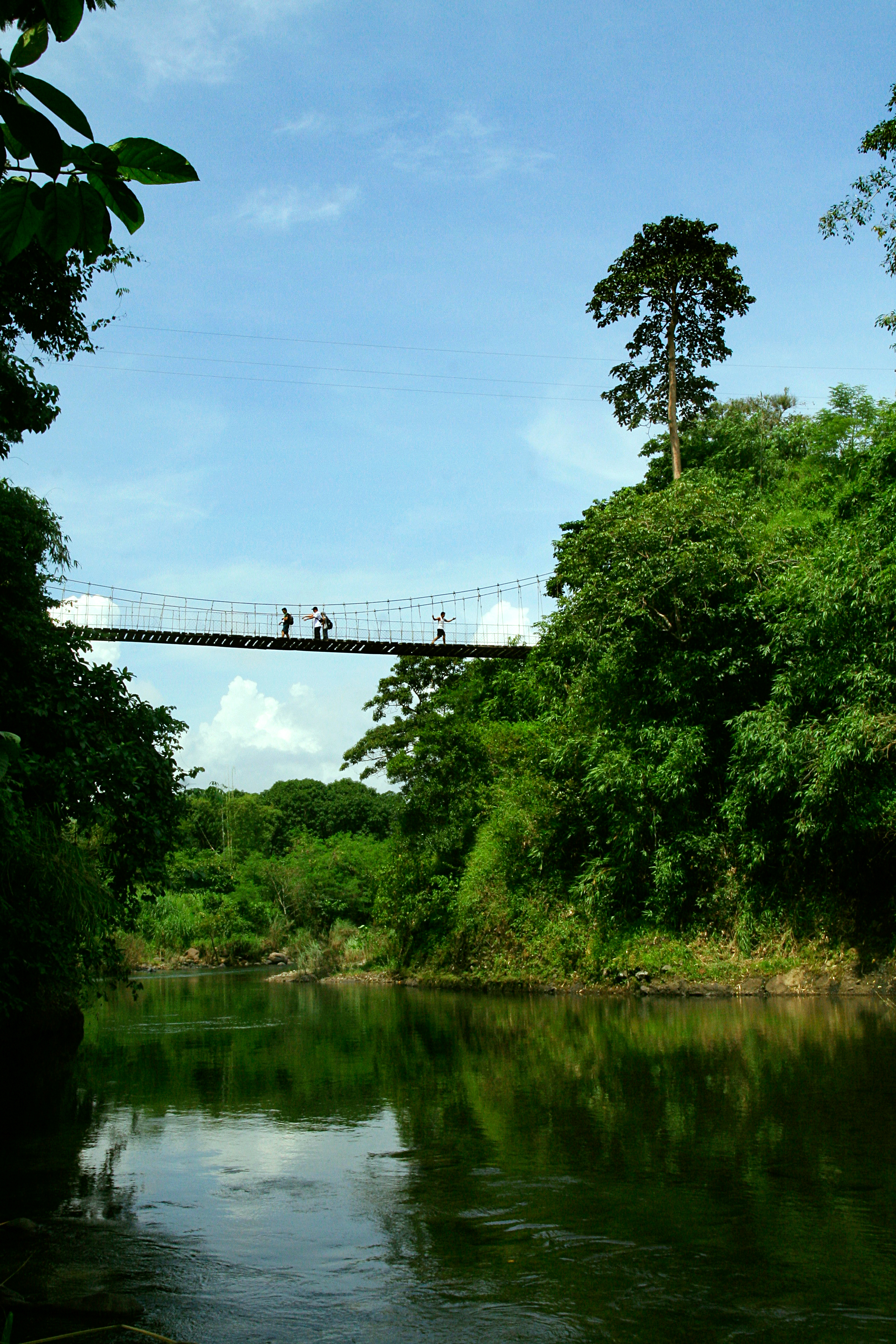
- Morong Municipal Hall Morong Catholic Church Pawikan Conservation Center Bataan Nuclear Power Plant Hanging Bridge

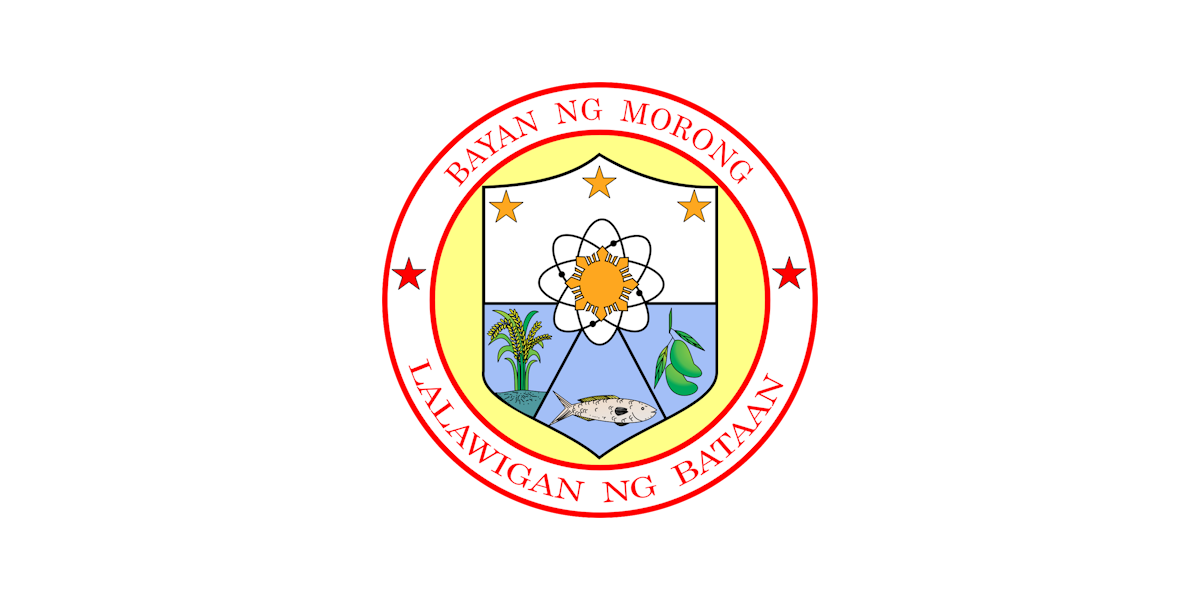
- Flag Seal
- Nickname: Bataan's Wild West
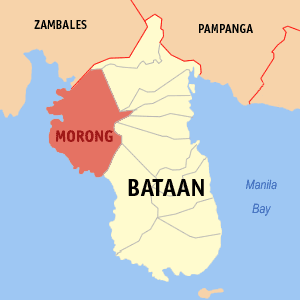
- Map of Bataan with Morong highlighted
- Interactive map of Morong
- Location within the Philippines
- Coordinates: 14°40′48″N 120°16′06″E
- Country: Philippines
- Region: Central Luzon
- Province: Bataan
- District: 3rd district
- Founded: 1607
- Barangays: 5 (see Barangays)

Government
  - Type: Sangguniang Bayan
  - Mayor: Leila Linao-Muñoz
  - Vice Mayor: Maria Chermaine Blossom Garcia
  - Representative: Maria Angela S. Garcia
  - Municipal Council: Members: Jomar A. Castro; Geronimo Gerardo T. Santos; Bienvenido V. Vicedo Jr.; Katherine L. Taba; Ruben M. Pastelero; Gerson Cathalin C. Garcia; German R. Noriega; Tirso R. Bautista
  - Electorate: 24,383 voters (2025)

Area
  - Total: 219.20 km^{2} (84.63 sq mi)
- Elevation: 24 m (79 ft)
- Highest elevation: 208 m (682 ft)
- Lowest elevation: 0 m (0 ft)

Population (2024 census)
  - Total: 37,024
  - Density: 168.91/km^{2} (437.46/sq mi)
  - Households: 8,278

Economy
  - Income class: 1st municipal income class
  - Poverty incidence: 13.68% (2023)
  - Revenue: ₱ 332 million (2024)
  - Assets: ₱ 902.5 million (2024)
  - Expenditure: ₱ 273 million (2024)

Service provider
  - Electricity: Peninsula Electric Cooperative (PENELCO)
- Time zone: UTC+8 (PST)
- ZIP code: 2108, 2222 (Subic Special Economic and Freeport Zone)
- PSGC: 0300808000
- IDD : area code: +63 (0)47
- Native languages: Mariveleño; Tagalog

Morong, officially the Municipality of Morong (Tagalog: Bayan ng Morong), is a municipality in the province of Bataan, Philippines. According to the 2024 census, it has a population of 37,024 people.

== History ==
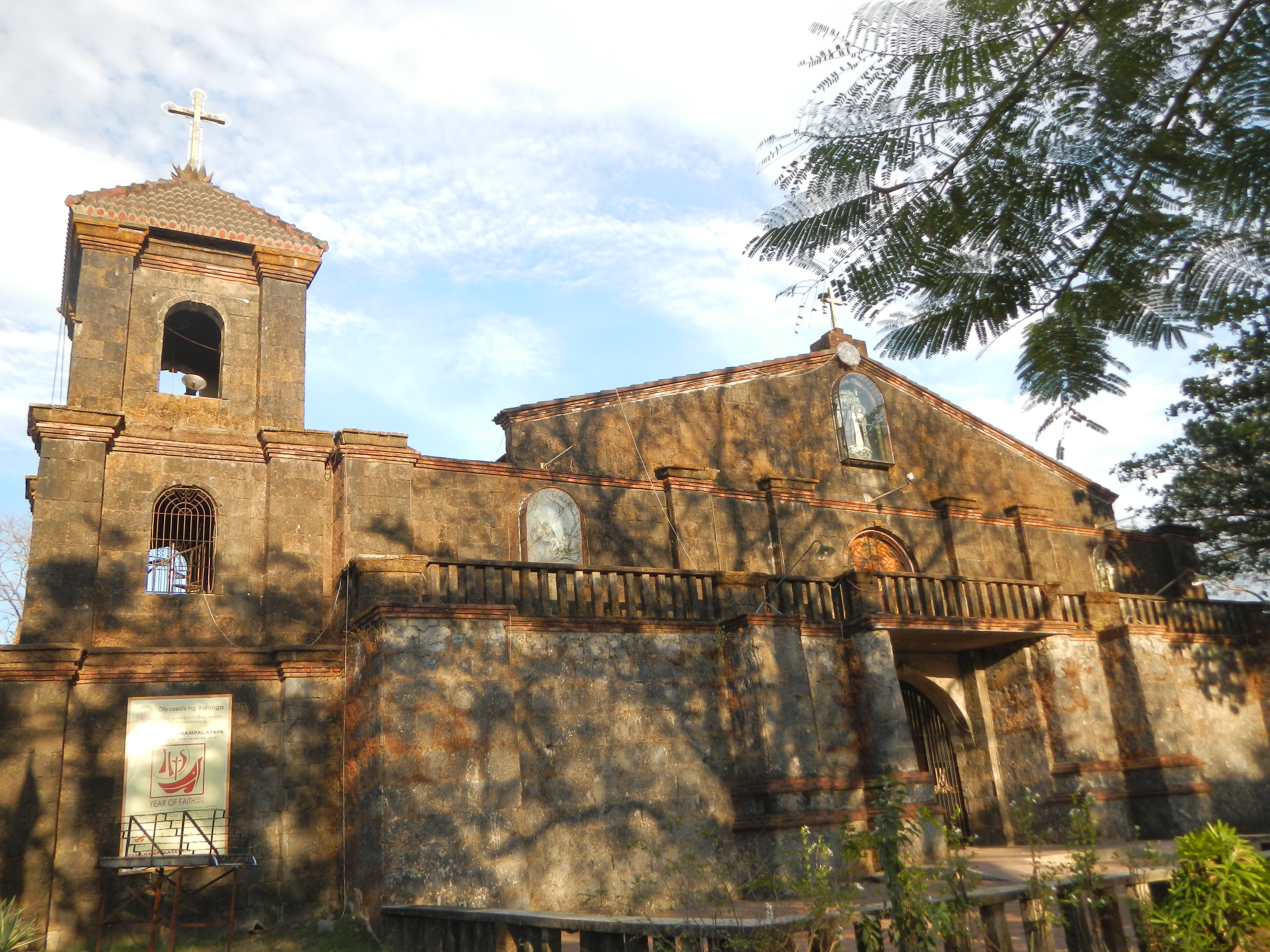
Our Lady of Pilar Parish Church

In 1607, Morong was officially founded as an ecclesiastical parish by the Augustinian Recollects who placed the town under the protection of the Our Lady of the Pillar. Its founding priest was Fr. Rodrigo de San Miguel.

On June 10, 1955, with the understanding of the Spanish language waning in most of the Philippines and with Moron having an unfortunate meaning in English, the town was renamed Morong by virtue of Republic Act No. 1249.

== Geography ==
According to the Philippine Statistics Authority, the municipality has a land area of 219.20 square kilometres (84.63 sq mi) constituting 15.97% of the 1,372.98-square-kilometre- (530.11 sq mi) total area of Bataan.

The municipality is home to Subic Bay International Airport, Subic Bay Freeport Zone (SBFZ; along with Hermosa also in the province of Bataan, and Olongapo and Subic in Zambales), the Bataan Nuclear Power Plant, and the former Philippine Refugee Processing Center. Morong was formerly known as Moron. It is accessible via the Bataan Provincial Expressway, off Exit 65.

Morong is bounded by Dinalupihan to the northeast, Hermosa and Orani to the east, and province of the Zambales to the north. Olongapo City is located directly north of Morong, accessible via SBMA–Olongapo Access Road through Rizal Highway to Aguinado Road or Security Road to East 14th Street. It is 51 kilometres (32 mi) from Balanga and 175 kilometres (109 mi) from Manila.

=== Environmental protection ===
The Pawikan Conservation Center is a community-based effort to protect turtles in Morong with a focus on protecting the Olive Ridley species.

=== Climate ===
Morong has a tropical monsoon climate (Af) with little to no rainfall from December to April and heavy to extremely heavy rainfall from May to November.

Climate data for Morong
Month	Jan	Feb	Mar	Apr	May	Jun	Jul	Aug	Sep	Oct	Nov	Dec	Year
Mean daily maximum °C (°F)	30.8 (87.4)	31.7 (89.1)	33.1 (91.6)	34.4 (93.9)	33.6 (92.5)	31.8 (89.2)	30.8 (87.4)	30.1 (86.2)	30.7 (87.3)	31.5 (88.7)	31.4 (88.5)	31.0 (87.8)	31.7 (89.1)
Daily mean °C (°F)	26.3 (79.3)	26.8 (80.2)	28.0 (82.4)	29.3 (84.7)	29.3 (84.7)	28.1 (82.6)	27.4 (81.3)	27.0 (80.6)	27.3 (81.1)	27.6 (81.7)	27.4 (81.3)	26.8 (80.2)	27.6 (81.7)
Mean daily minimum °C (°F)	21.9 (71.4)	21.9 (71.4)	22.9 (73.2)	24.3 (75.7)	25.0 (77.0)	24.5 (76.1)	24.1 (75.4)	24.0 (75.2)	23.9 (75.0)	23.8 (74.8)	23.4 (74.1)	22.6 (72.7)	23.5 (74.3)
Average rainfall mm (inches)	5 (0.2)	4 (0.2)	4 (0.2)	17 (0.7)	211 (8.3)	509 (20.0)	711 (28.0)	1,036 (40.8)	523 (20.6)	234 (9.2)	82 (3.2)	21 (0.8)	3,357 (132.2)
Source: Climate-Data.org

=== Barangays ===
Morong is politically subdivided into 5 barangays, as shown in the matrix below. Each barangay consists of puroks and some have sitios.

PSGC	Barangay	Population			±% p.a.	
		2024		2010		
030808001	Binaritan	16.1%	5,966	5,273	▴	0.86%
030808002	Mabayo	12.9%	4,771	4,275	▴	0.76%
030808003	Nagbalayong	16.8%	6,207	5,680	▴	0.62%
030808004	Poblacion	14.9%	5,511	5,105	▴	0.53%
030808005	Sabang	20.1%	7,446	5,838	▴	1.70%
	Total		37,024	26,171	▴	2.43%

== Demographics ==
Population census of Morong

Year	Pop.	±% p.a.
1903	1,906	—
1918	2,576	+2.03%
1939	3,301	+1.19%
1948	3,336	+0.12%
1960	5,734	+4.62%
1970	6,738	+1.62%
1975	7,793	+2.96%
1980	10,637	+6.42%

Year	Pop.	±% p.a.
1990	17,155	+4.90%
1995	18,731	+1.66%
2000	21,273	+2.77%
2007	27,119	+3.41%
2010	26,171	−1.29%
2015	29,901	+2.57%
2020	35,394	+3.61%
2024	37,024	+1.09%

Source: Philippine Statistics Authority

According to the Spanish Census of the country in 1896, Morong was reported to have 2,797 inhabitants.

In the 2024 census, Morong had a population of 37,024 people. The population density was 170 inhabitants per square kilometre (440/sq mi).

== Economy ==
Poverty incidence of Morong (%)

Source: Philippine Statistics Authority

Existing industries in Morong include mango/cashew production as well as vinegar making from nipa palm nuts and the production of basketry using jungle vines.

There is some variety of developments intended for Morong. Industries targeted for development are the manufacturing of component parts or assembly operations. In addition, there are plans to establish convention centers, exhibit halls, golf course and clubs, entertainment and leisure and sports centers, hotels, beach resorts and meditation centers.

=== Mining ===
Morong has also had some activity in mining. In 1972 it had mining activity from Long Beach Mining Corporation producing magnetite concentrate from beach sands and in 2017 there was headway into opening 709.6 hectares of land to Gandara minerals and development corporation in order to mine basalt and other associated minerals.

=== Economic zone developments ===
The Bataan Technology Park (informally called the "Technopark") is the main zone of the Morong Special Economic Zone (MSEZ), established in March 1997 after a previous ecozone which was established under the 1992 Bases Conversion and Development Act. Aside from Bataan Technology Park, parts of the municipality are also covered by Subic Special Economic and Freeport Zone under Subic Bay Metropolitan Authority (SBMA).

== Government ==
=== Local government ===
Term	Mayor	Vice Mayor
1901-1903	Salvador Linao	n.a.
1903-1905	Mariano Sulangi	n.a.
1905-1907	Hermogenes Ramos	n.a.
1908-1909	Salvador Linao	n.a.
1910-1912	Nicolas Mangalindan	n.a.
1912-1916	Salvador Linao	n.a.
1916-1919	Pablo Sulangi	Facundo Angeles
1919-1922	Facundo Angeles	Nicolas Mangalindan
1922-1925	Melencio S. Batol	Prudencio Mangalindan
1925-1928	Cirilo Z. Paguio	Gaudencio Mangalindan
1928-1931	Gaudencio Mangalindan	Melencio Batol
1931-1934	Anselmo Calma	Petronilo Dizon
1934-1937	Claudio Pastelero	Pedro Corpuz
1938-1941	Buenaventura Linao	Juan Paguio
1941-1942	Estanislao Angeles	Juan Paguio
1942-1945	Florentino Bugay	none
1945-1946	Ambrosio Guzman	none
1946-1947	Buenaventura Linao	Juan Llenarez
1948-1951	Isidoro G. Sulangi	Ambrosio Guzman
1952-1955	Lorenzo E. Gonzales	Primo Valdez
1956-1959	Julian V. Ramos	n.a.
1960-1963	Julian V. Ramos	n.a.
1964-1967	Antonio Calimbas	n.a.
1968-1971	Venancio Vicedo	n.a.
1972-1976	Norberto S. Linao Sr.	n.a.
1976-1979	Norberto S. Linao Sr.	n.a.
1979-1980	Antonio S. Calimbas	n.a.
1980-1986	Antonio S. Calimbas	n.a.
1986-1988	Armando Quimlat	n.a.
1988-1992	Armando Quimlat	n.a.
1992-1995	Bienvenido Vicedo Sr.	n.a.
1995-1998	Catalino Calimbas	_________de Leon
1998-2001	Norberto G. Linao Jr.	Rosalinda Quimlat
2001-2004	Norberto G. Linao Jr.	Pablito Bugay
2004-2007	Norberto G. Linao Jr.	Pablito Bugay
2007-2010	Cynthia Linao-Estanislao,	Jose Calma
2010-2013	Cynthia Linao-Estanislao	Bienvenido Vicedo Jr.
2013-2016	Jorge Estanislao.	Bienvenido Vicedo Jr.

== Education ==
The Morong Schools District Office governs all educational institutions within the municipality. It oversees the management and operations of all private and public, from primary to secondary schools.

=== Primary and elementary schools ===
- Binaritan Elementary School
- Facundo Angeles Memorial Elementary School
- Joyous Kiddie Learning Center
- Mabayo Elementary School
- Maranatha Christian Academy
- Minanga Elementary School
- Morong Elementary School
- Nagbalayong Elementary School
- Our Lady of the Pillar Parochial School
- Panibatuhan Elementary School

=== Secondary schools ===
- Kanawan Integrated School
- Morong National High School
- Morong National High School - Annex (Mabayo)
- Nagbalayong National High School
- Sampaloc Integrated School

== Gallery ==
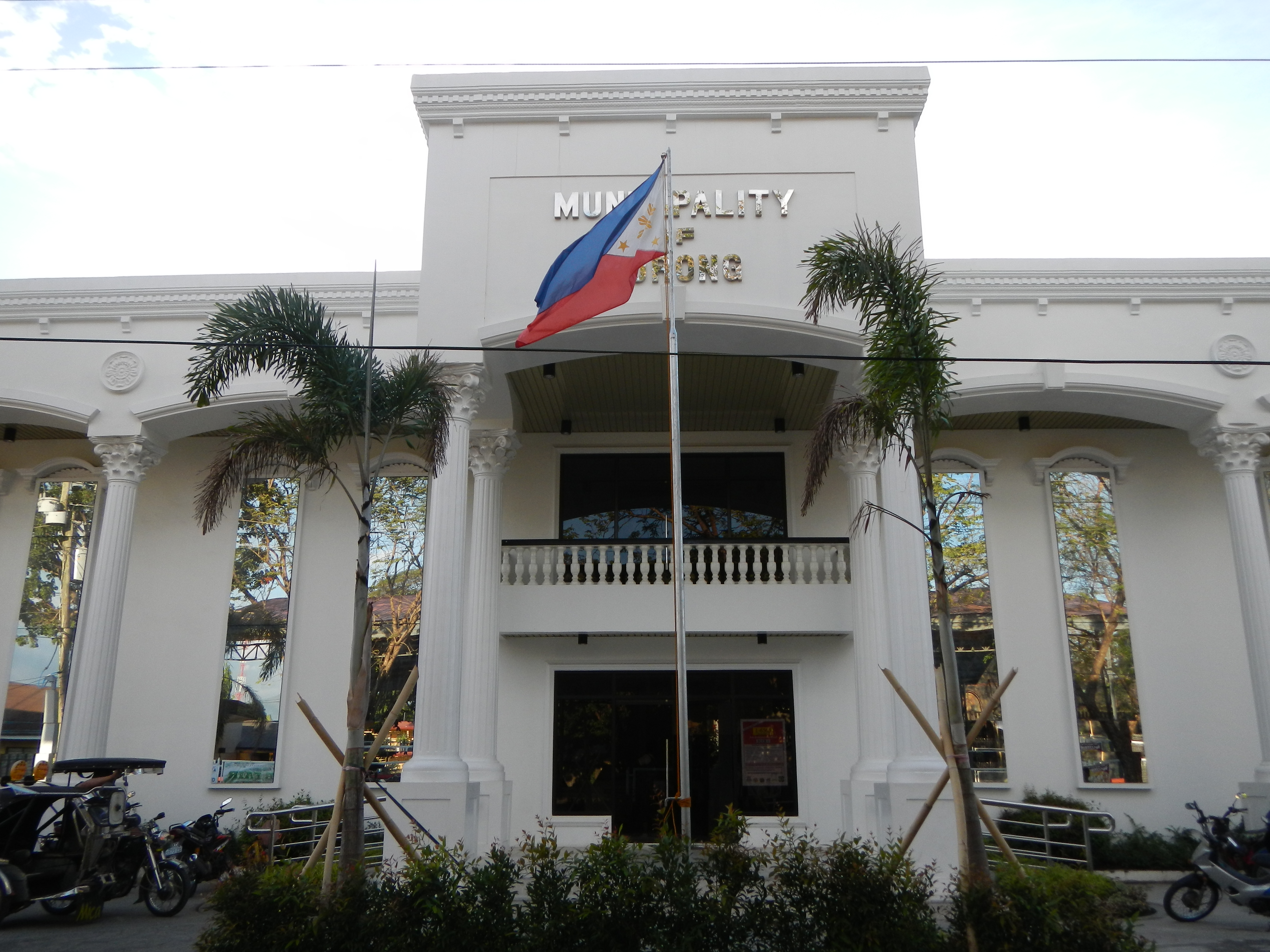
Municipal hall

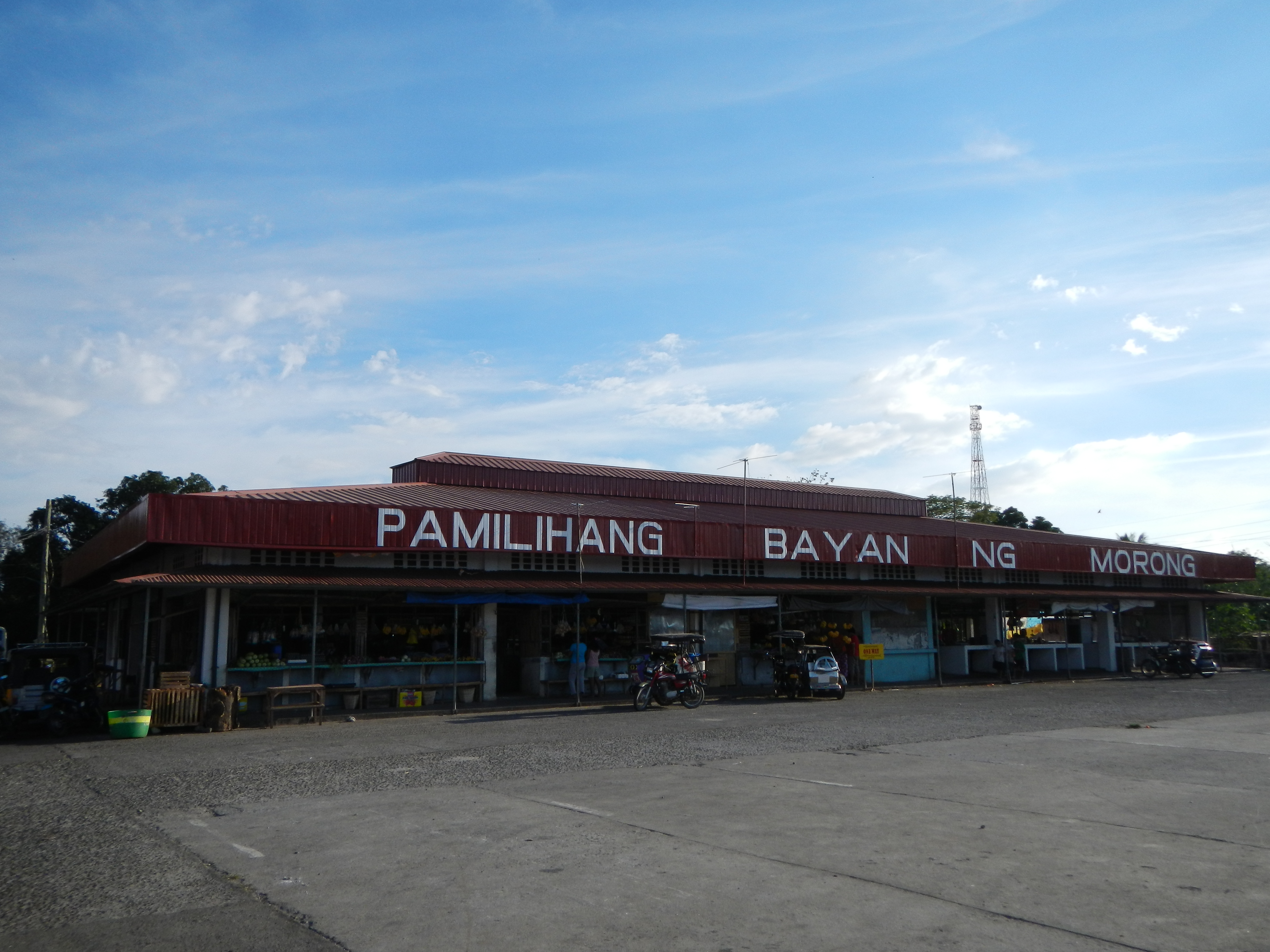
Public market

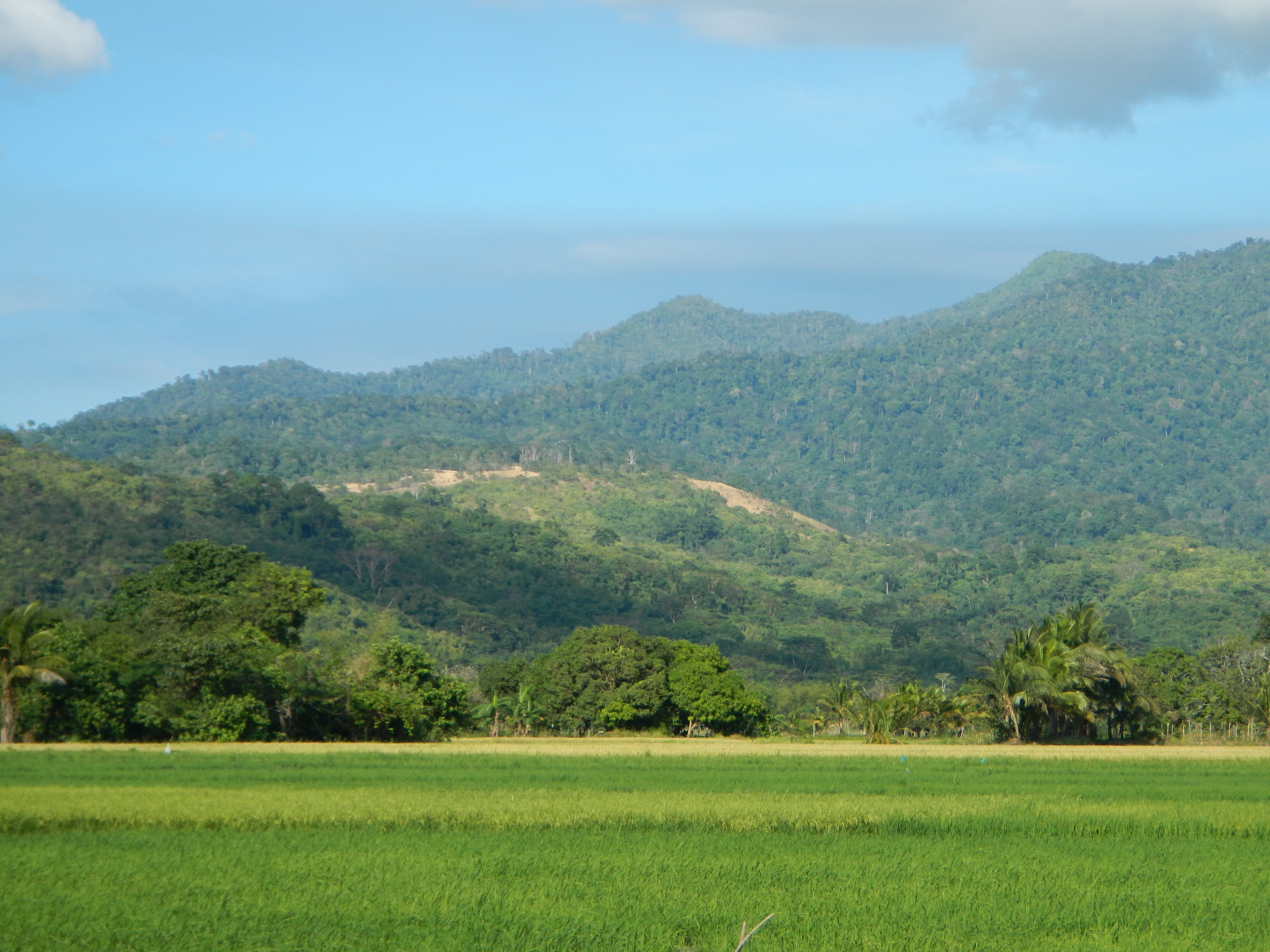
Morong landscape

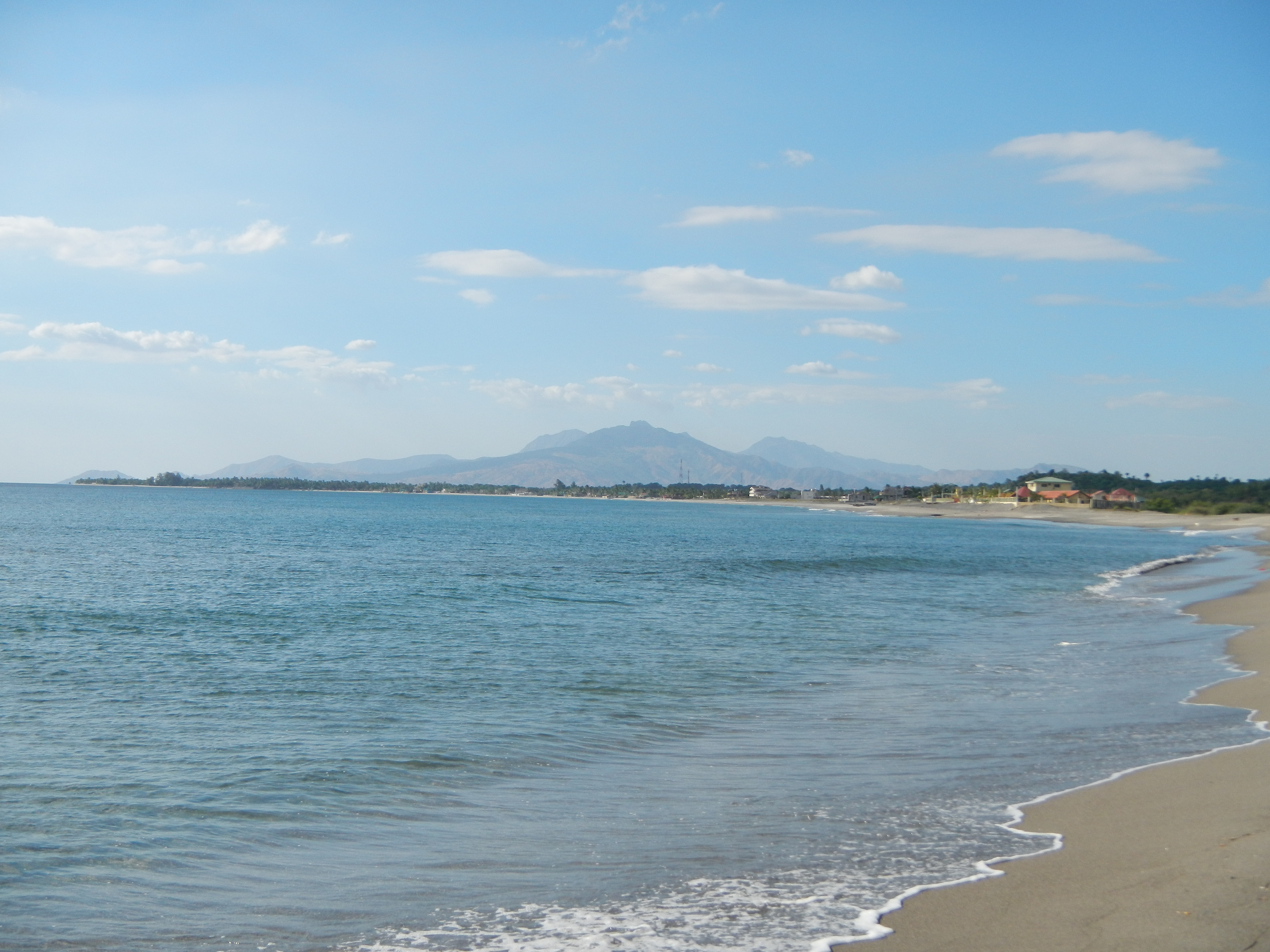
Seascape

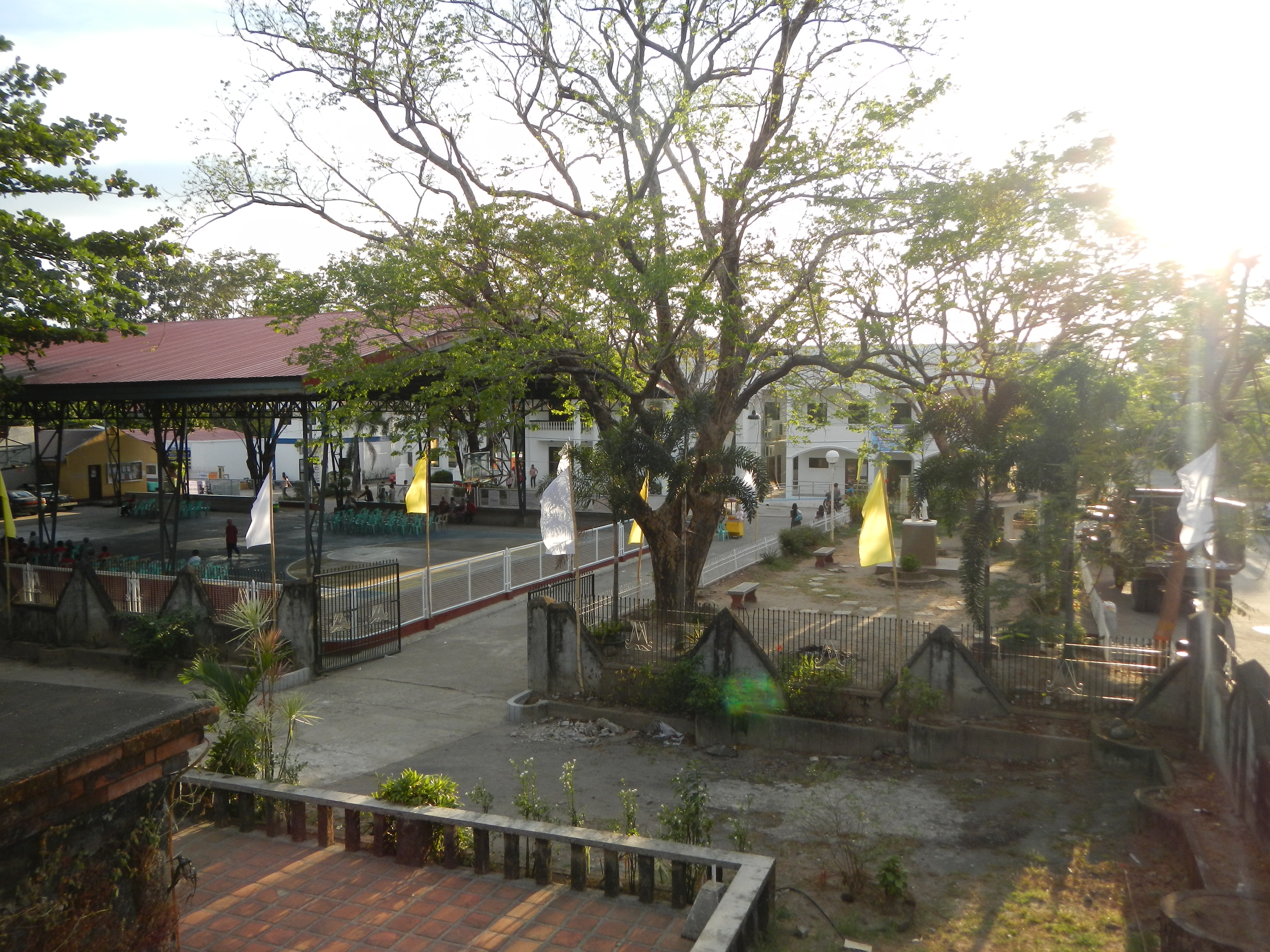
Park and covered court
