= Subic, Zambales =

Municipality in Zambales, Philippines

Subic
- Municipality
- Municipality of Subic
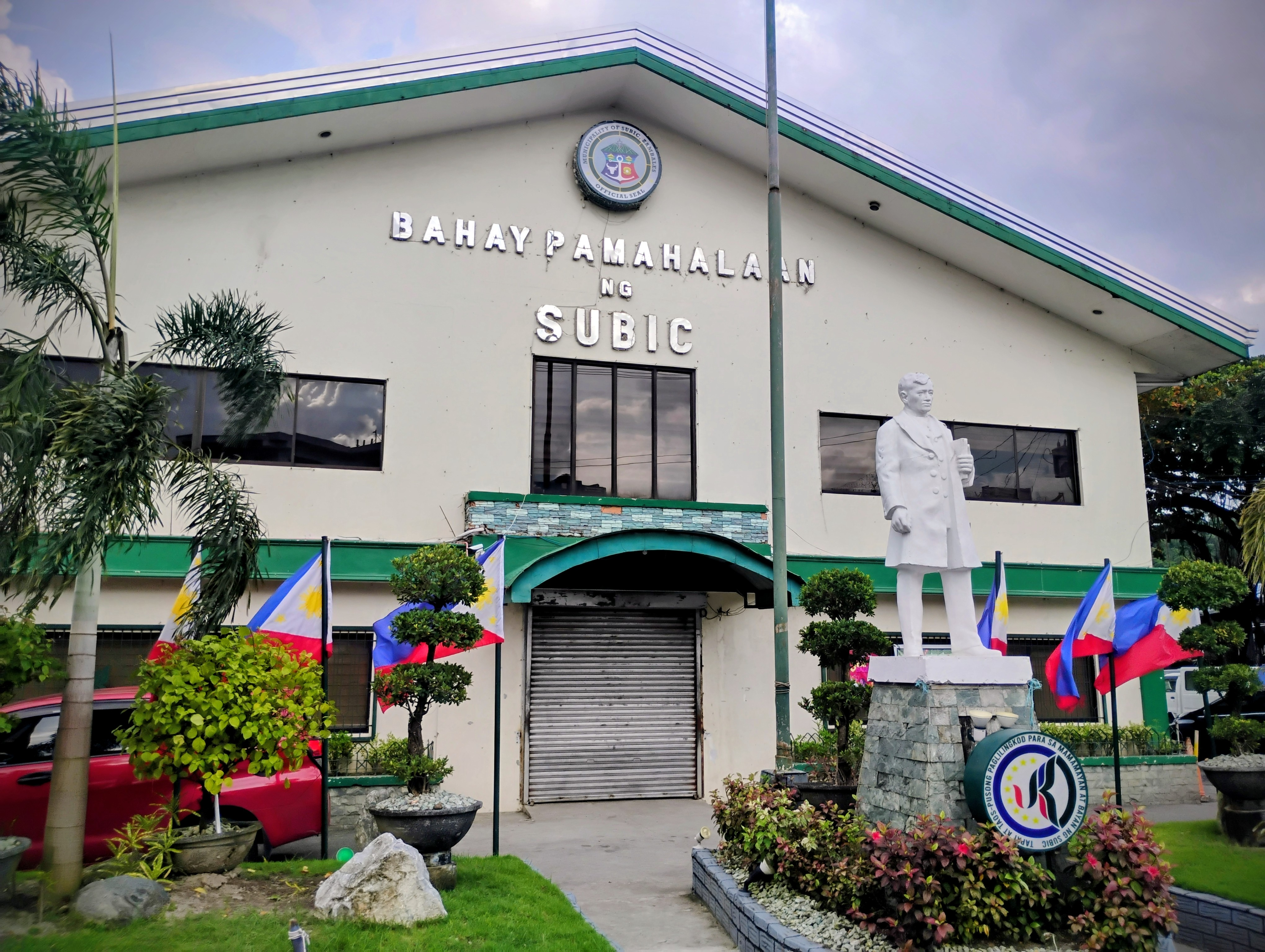
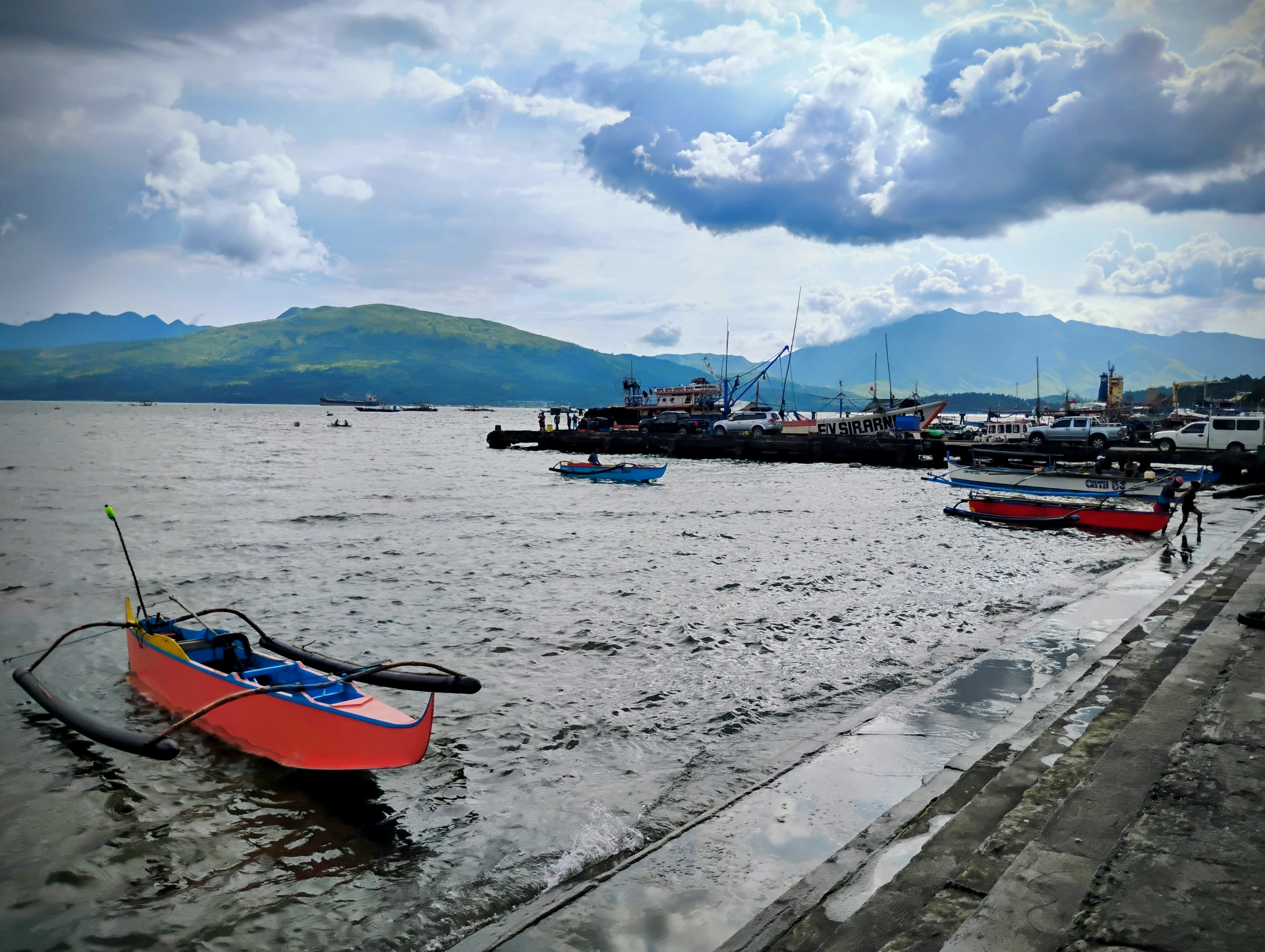
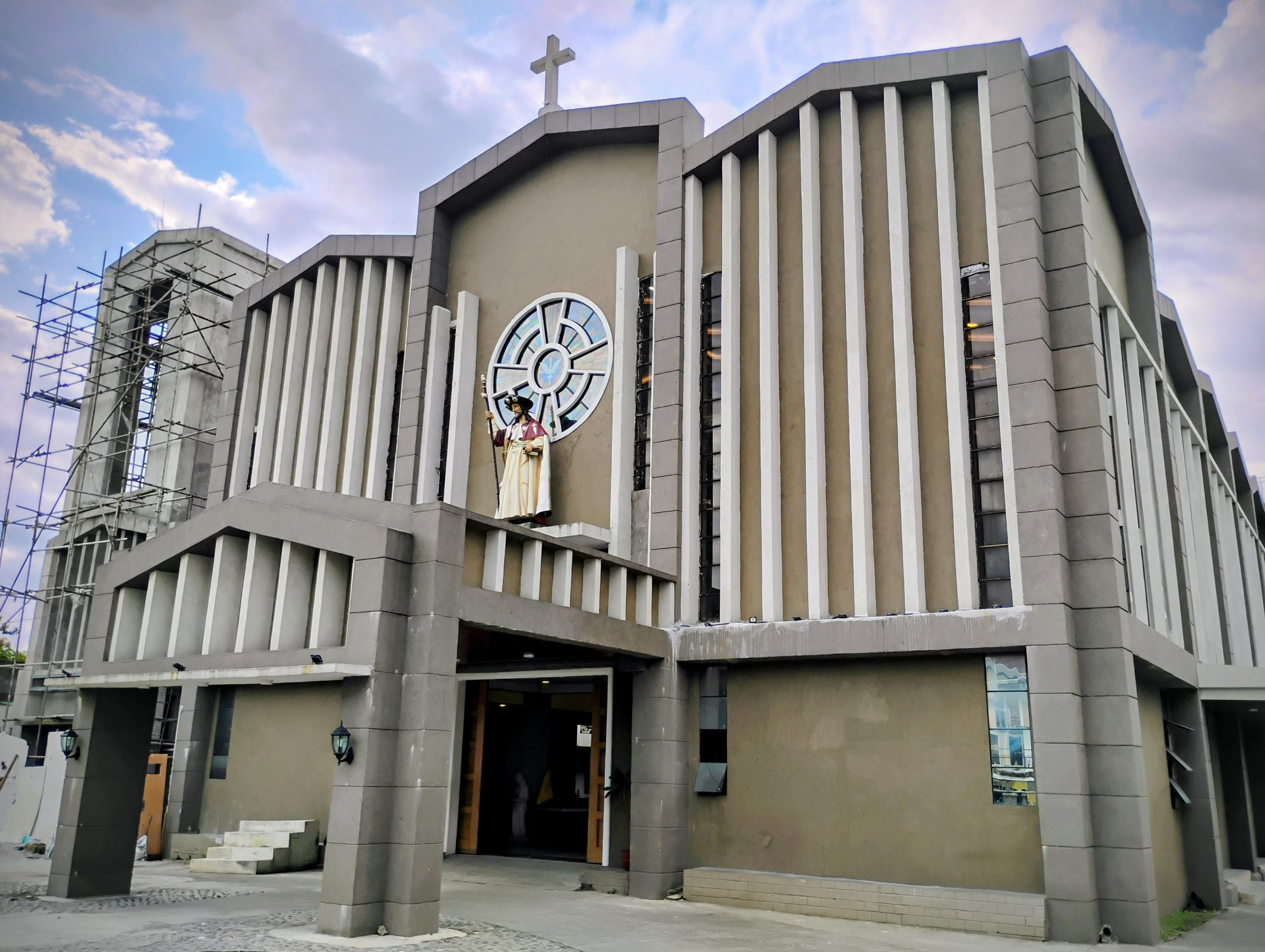
- Subic Municipal Hall Subic Fish Port Saint James Parish Church

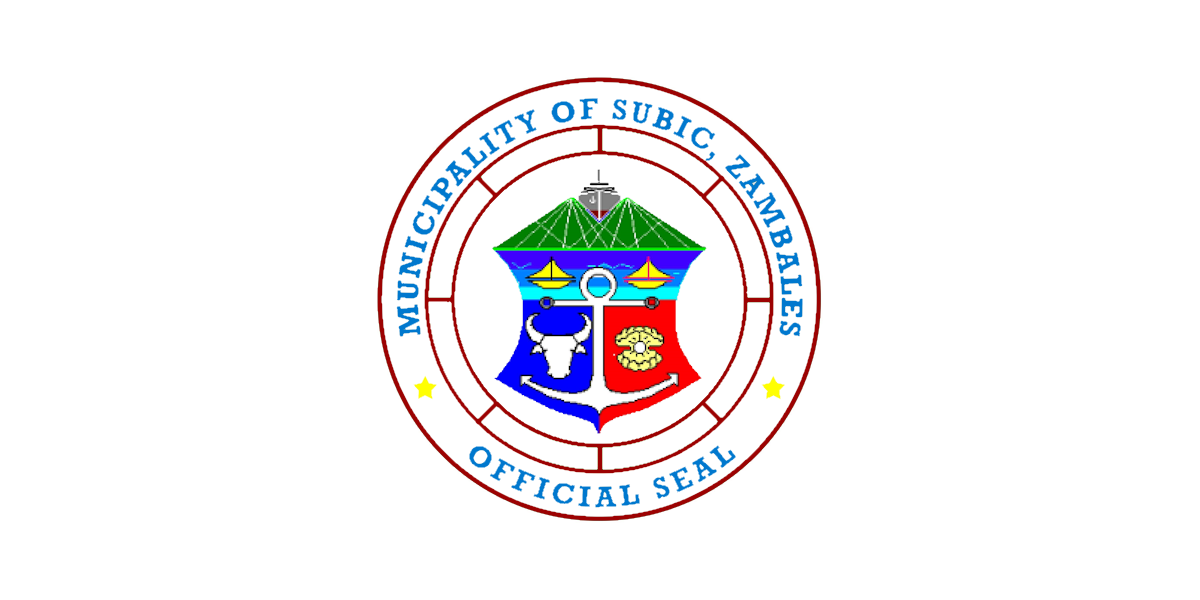
- Flag Seal

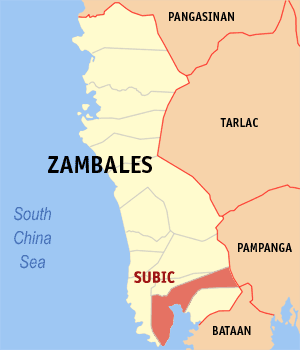
- Map of Zambales with Subic highlighted
- Interactive map of Subic
- Location within the Philippines
- Coordinates: 14°52′37″N 120°13′58″E
- Country: Philippines
- Region: Central Luzon
- Province: Zambales
- District: 1st district
- Founded: 1572
- Founder: Juan de Salcedo
- Barangays: 16 (see Barangays)

Government
  - Type: Sangguniang Bayan
  - Mayor: Jonathan John Ferrer Khonghun
  - Vice Mayor: Lauro B. Simbol
  - Representative: Jefferson "Jay" F. Khonghun
  - Municipal Council: Members: Elmer S. Tumaca; Danilo S. Fontelera; Ruel P. Sarmiento; Ronnie B. dela Cruz; Orlando M. Timbol; Emma A. Quintos; Gennyfer G. Chantengco; Osias F. Huerta
  - Electorate: 68,402 voters (2025)

Area
  - Total: 287.16 km^{2} (110.87 sq mi)
- Elevation: 60 m (200 ft)
- Highest elevation: 557 m (1,827 ft)
- Lowest elevation: 0 m (0 ft)

Population (2024 census)
  - Total: 116,788
  - Density: 406.70/km^{2} (1,053.3/sq mi)
  - Households: 28,202

Economy
  - Income class: 1st municipal income class
  - Poverty incidence: 17.67% (2023)
  - Revenue: ₱ 628.8 million (2024)
  - Assets: ₱ 909.7 million (2024)
  - Expenditure: ₱ 631.6 million (2024)
  - Liabilities: ₱ 495.2 million (2024)

Service provider
  - Electricity: Zambales 2 Electric Cooperative (ZAMECO 2)
- Time zone: UTC+8 (PST)
- ZIP code: 2209, 2222 (Subic Special Economic and Freeport Zone)
- PSGC: 0307114000
- IDD : area code: +63 (0)47
- Native languages: Ilocano; Sambal; Tagalog; Kapampangan; Ambala
- Website: subic.gov.ph

Subic, officially the Municipality of Subic (Ilocano: Ili ti Subic; Tagalog: Bayan ng Subic, Kapampangan: Balen ning Subic), is a Municipality in the Province of Zambales, Philippines. According to the 2024 census, it has a population of 116,788 people.

== Etymology ==
The native Zambales inhabitants called the area Hubek, which means "head of a plough"; Spanish missionary priests mispronounced the name as Subiq. By the time of the American occupation, "Subiq" was mispronounced as Subig. Eventually, the name reverted to "Subiq", but the letter 'q' was replaced with 'c'.

== History ==
=== Spanish colonial era ===
In 1572, Juan de Salcedo, the Mexico-born Spanish conquistador and grandson of Miguel Lopez de Legazpi, founded Zambales during his exploration of northern Luzon. Subic was founded in late 1607 by Augustinian friars headed by Rev. Fr. Rodrigo de San Miguel, and the natives in Subic were Christianized under Spanish rule.

In 1884 that declared Subic as "a naval port and the property appertaining there to set aside for naval purposes." Construction of an arsenal and ship repair yard ensued March 8 the following year, as ordered by the new settlers' Naval Commission. During the Philippine Revolution, a fleet led by the Cuban-Filipino Admiral Vicente Catalan seized the naval base at Subic from the Spanish for the First Philippine Republic. Subic Bay's potential as naval station was realized by the Americans. Commodore George Dewey and his men engaged in a battle that destroyed the Spanish Army in 1898, and the Americans took over Subic Bay on December 10, 1899.

=== British invasion ===
In September 1762, the British invaded the Philippines and took over the Spanish main naval base in Manila Bay. This prompted the Spanish military to scout for the next promising naval station. The expedition returned with the good news for the naval command - a natural bounty and deep waters at Subic Bay.

=== American colonial era ===
The Americans designated the Subic Bay area as a repair and supply naval base site in 1901. Two years later, US President Theodore Roosevelt declared 283.27 km^{2} (109.37 sq mi) of land in Subic as a military reservation area; or more than half of Subic's land area at the time.

=== Japanese occupation ===
Subic, along with the Olongapo area suffered significant damage during World War II and was repurposed by the Imperial Japanese Army as their own base during the Japanese occupation.

=== Philippine independence ===
After World War II, Olongapo, a barrio of Subic that forms part of the US Military Reservations in the Subic area, was turned over to the Philippine government. Olongapo was converted to a municipality independent from Subic town through Executive Order No. 366 issued by President Carlos P. Garcia on December 7, 1959.

== Geography ==
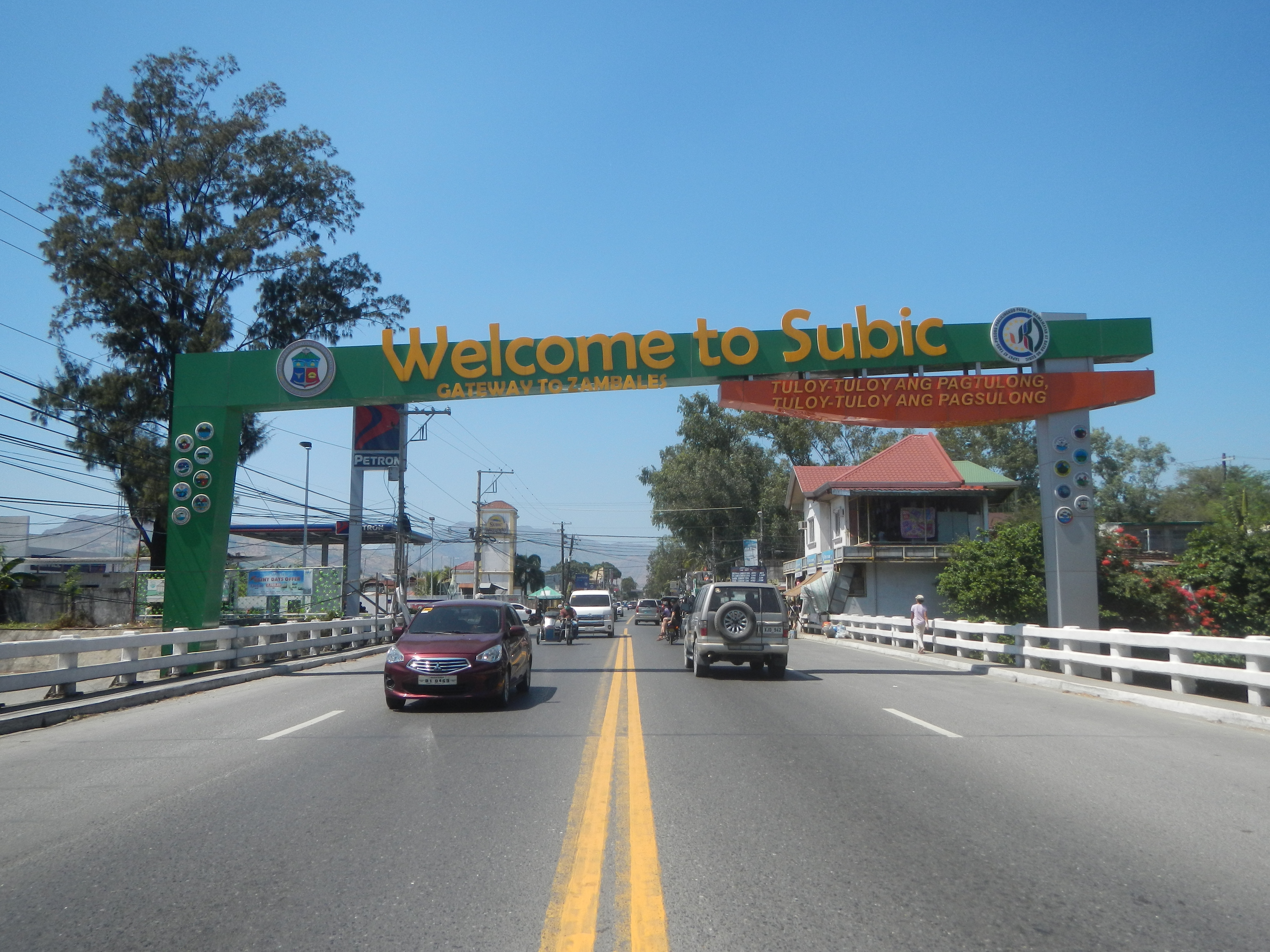
Welcome arch at the Olongapo-Bugallon Road

Subic is located along the northern coast of Subic Bay. Portions of the town also form part of the Subic Special Economic and Freeport Zone.

Subic is 66 kilometres (41 mi) from Iba, 12 kilometres (7.5 mi) from Olongapo, and 138 kilometres (86 mi) from Manila.

=== Barangays ===
Subic is politically subdivided into 16 barangays, as shown below. Each barangay consists of puroks and some have sitios.

- Aningway-Sacatihan
- Asinan (Poblacion)
- Asinan Proper
- Baraca-Camachile (Poblacion)
- Batiawan
- Calapacuan
- Calapandayan (Poblacion)
- Cawag
- Ilwas (Poblacion)
- Mangan-Vaca
- Matain
- Naugsol
- Pamatawan
- San Isidro
- Santo Tomas
- Wawandue (Poblacion)

=== Climate ===
Subic has a tropical monsoon climate (Köppen Am). Subic's climate is no different from the other towns in the western part of Luzon where rainy season runs from May to October, while the dry season is from November to April. The wettest month of the year is July with average monthly rainfall more than 755 millimetres (29.7 in) and the driest month is February with average monthly rainfall less than 5 millimetres (0.20 in). The highest ever recorded temperature in the area is 38.8 °C (101.8 °F) and the lowest is 17.9 °C (64.2 °F). The annual average temperature in the city is 27.9 °C (82.2 °F).

Climate data for Subic, Zambales (1992–2010, extremes recorded in Naval Air Station Cubi Point 1994–2012)
Month	Jan	Feb	Mar	Apr	May	Jun	Jul	Aug	Sep	Oct	Nov	Dec	Year
Record high °C (°F)	35.2 (95.4)	38.0 (100.4)	36.5 (97.7)	38.2 (100.8)	38.8 (101.8)	37.7 (99.9)	36.2 (97.2)	35.0 (95.0)	35.7 (96.3)	35.3 (95.5)	34.7 (94.5)	34.4 (93.9)	38.8 (101.8)
Mean daily maximum °C (°F)	31.2 (88.2)	32.1 (89.8)	33.5 (92.3)	34.5 (94.1)	33.1 (91.6)	31.7 (89.1)	30.9 (87.6)	30.4 (86.7)	30.7 (87.3)	31.6 (88.9)	31.7 (89.1)	31.0 (87.8)	31.9 (89.4)
Daily mean °C (°F)	26.8 (80.2)	27.4 (81.3)	28.5 (83.3)	29.6 (85.3)	29.1 (84.4)	28.2 (82.8)	27.7 (81.9)	27.4 (81.3)	27.5 (81.5)	27.9 (82.2)	27.8 (82.0)	27.1 (80.8)	27.9 (82.2)
Mean daily minimum °C (°F)	22.5 (72.5)	22.7 (72.9)	23.6 (74.5)	24.8 (76.6)	25.1 (77.2)	24.8 (76.6)	24.4 (75.9)	24.4 (75.9)	24.3 (75.7)	24.2 (75.6)	23.9 (75.0)	23.2 (73.8)	24.0 (75.2)
Record low °C (°F)	17.9 (64.2)	18.7 (65.7)	19.8 (67.6)	21.5 (70.7)	21.5 (70.7)	19.0 (66.2)	20.0 (68.0)	21.4 (70.5)	21.0 (69.8)	20.6 (69.1)	20.6 (69.1)	18.5 (65.3)	17.9 (64.2)
Average rainfall mm (inches)	6.0 (0.24)	4.2 (0.17)	16.1 (0.63)	22.5 (0.89)	416.8 (16.41)	385.7 (15.19)	759.7 (29.91)	753.5 (29.67)	695.8 (27.39)	214.5 (8.44)	81.9 (3.22)	21.9 (0.86)	3,378.6 (133.02)
Average rainy days (≥ 0.1 mm)	2	1	3	3	12	17	23	24	21	13	8	5	132
Average relative humidity (%)	67	66	65	65	73	78	81	81	82	77	73	68	73
Source: PAGASA

== Government ==
=== Chief executives ===
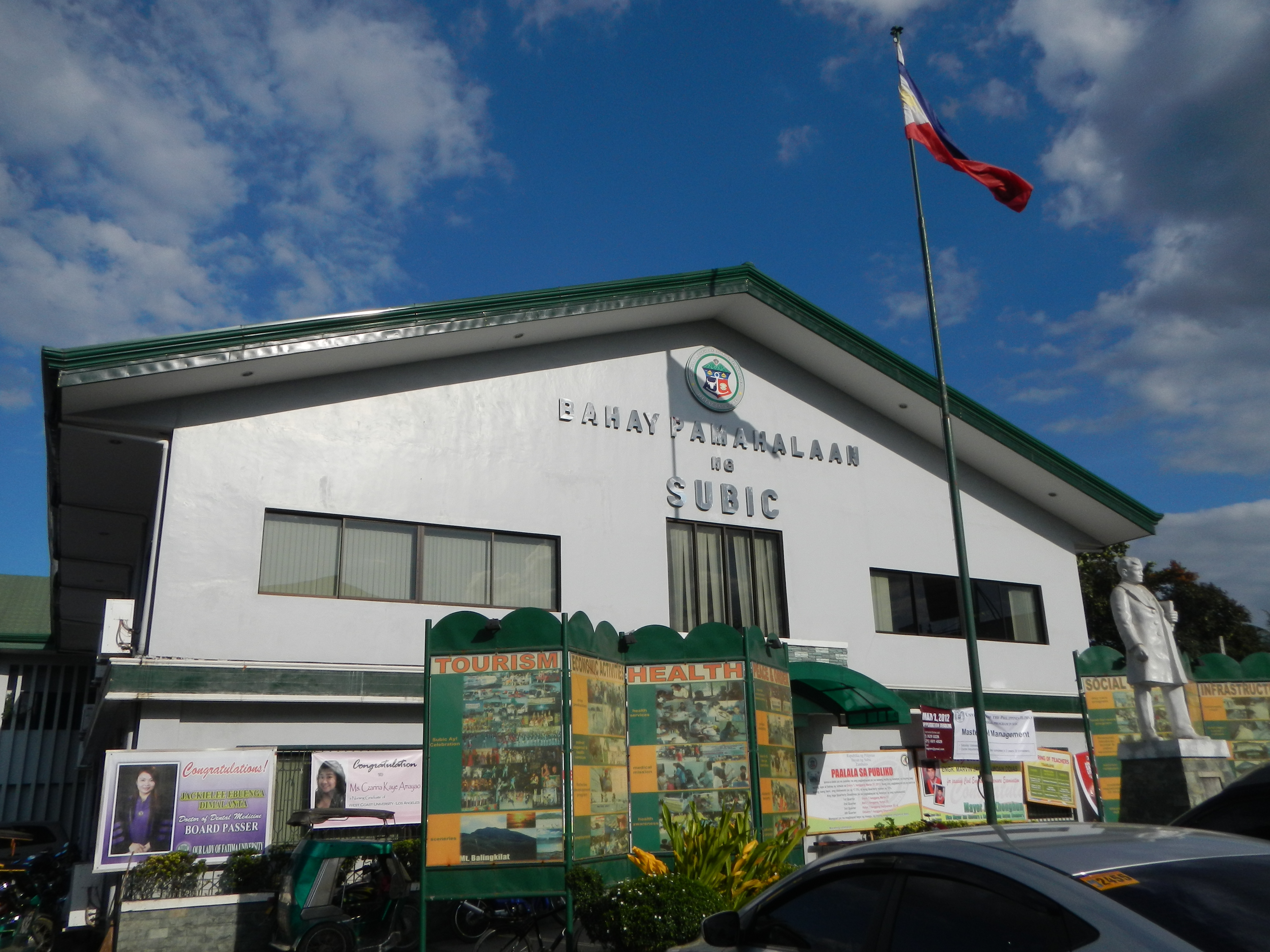
Subic Municipal Hall

This is the complete list of municipal leaders such as Mayor and Presidente Municipal since it became a municipality in 1902.

Name	Term	Position
Placido dela Paz	1902 – 1904	Presidente Municipal
Salustiano Ponco	1905 – 1908	Presidente Municipal
Nicetas Lesaca	1908 – 1910	Presidente Municipal
Jorge Salang	1911 – 1913	Presidente Municipal
Jose Orozco Sr.	1914 – 1916	Presidente Municipal
Juan Juico	1917 – 1919	Presidente Municipal
Esteban Felicitas	1920 – 1922	Municipal Mayor
Pedro del Rosario	1920 – 1922	Municipal Mayor
Alfredo de Perio Sr.	1923 – 1931	Municipal Mayor
Numeriano Flores	1932 – 1940	Municipal Mayor
Cecilio Esteban	1941 – 1943	Municipal Mayor
Severino Salang	1944 – 1946	Municipal Mayor
Alfredo de Perio Jr.	1944 – 1946	Municipal Mayor
Leopoldo Lauzares	1947 – 1948	Municipal Mayor
Jose de Perio Sr.	1948 – 1951	Municipal Mayor
Alfredo Afable	1952 – 1955	Municipal Mayor
Cecilio Panaligan	1956 – November 1959	Municipal Mayor
Dangal Guevara	June 30, 1960 – 1986	Municipal Mayor
Manuel M. Molina Jr.	1986	OIC Municipal Mayor (1st term)
Segundino Sandoval	1986	OIC Municipal Mayor
Manuel M. Molina Jr.	1986 – June 30, 1998	Municipal Mayor (2nd term)
Enrique F. Delgado	1998	Municipal Mayor
Leonardo 'Boy' Guevara	1998 – June 30, 2001	Municipal Mayor
Jeffrey D. Khonghun	June 30, 2001 – June 30, 2010	Municipal Mayor
Jefferson F. Khonghun	June 30, 2010 – June 30, 2019	Municipal Mayor
Jonathan John F. Khonghun	June 30, 2019 – present	Municipal Mayor

== Demographics ==
Population census of Subic
Year	Pop.	±% p.a.
1903	3,955	—
1918	14,159	+8.87%
1939	14,923	+0.25%
1948	25,223	+6.01%
1960	12,985	−5.38%
1970	22,266	+5.53%
1975	28,139	+4.81%
1980	30,340	+1.52%
1990	46,929	+4.46%
1995	57,099	+3.74%
2000	63,019	+2.14%
2007	77,118	+2.82%
2010	89,724	+5.66%
2015	104,771	+3.00%
2020	111,912	+1.40%
2024	116,788	+1.03%
Source: Philippine Statistics Authority

In the 2024 census, the population of Subic was 116,788 people, with a density of 410 inhabitants per square kilometre or 1,100 inhabitants per square mile.

== Economy ==
Poverty incidence of Subic (%)

Source: Philippine Statistics Authority

A part of the town of Subic is within the jurisdiction of the Subic Freeport Zone, which is managed by the Subic Bay Metropolitan Authority. The revenue earned by the special economic zone is shared by seven municipalities, including Subic town, and the City of Olongapo.

== Infrastructure ==
=== Transportation ===
==== Roads ====
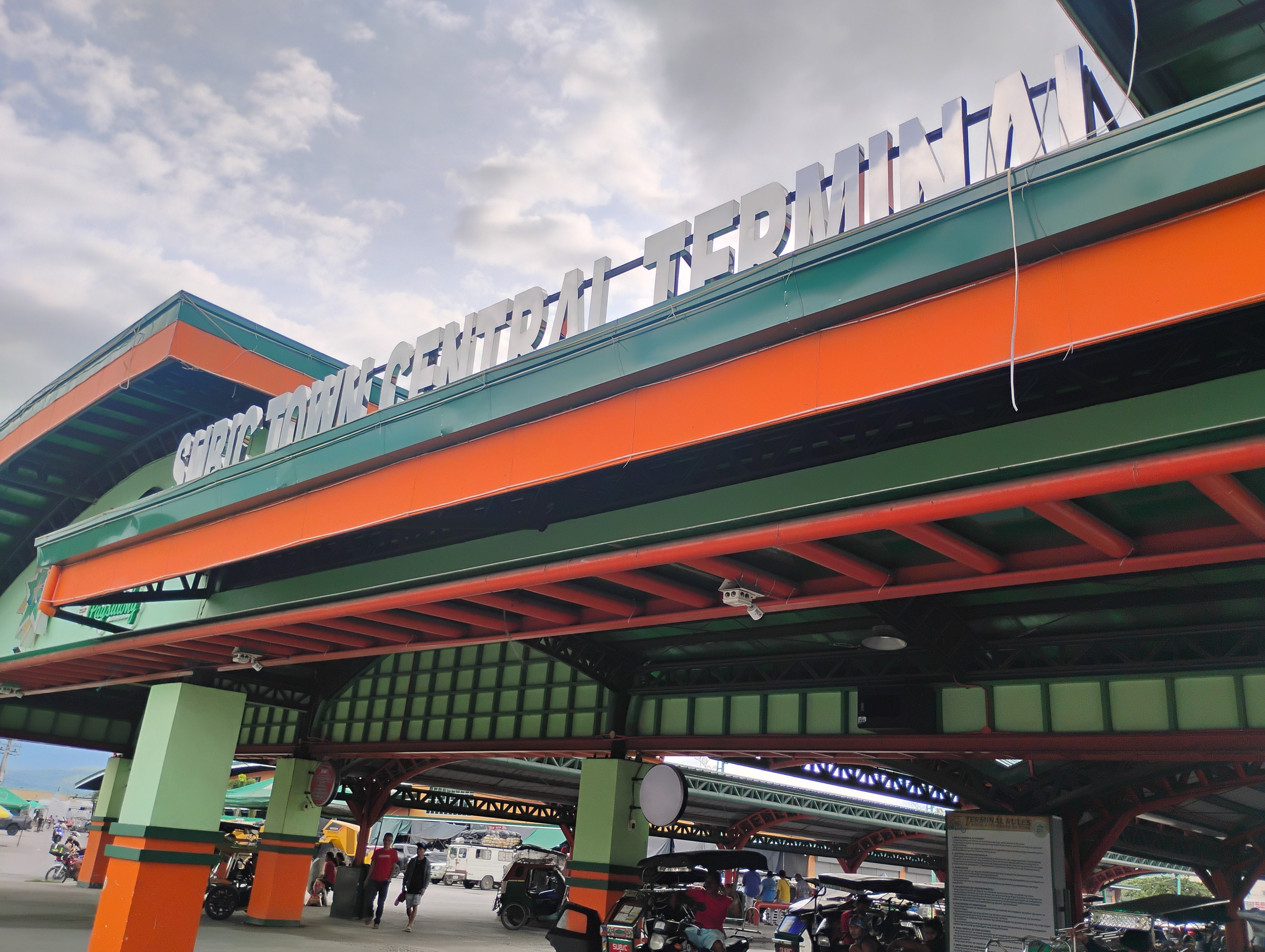
Subic Town Central Terminal

The primary road that connects Subic to the other parts of the town is the Olongapo–Bugallon Road. Most of the names of Subic's streets are based on the surnames of prominent residents or names of plants. Most of the roads in Subic are made of concrete and asphalt while others are still made of dirt.

Bypass roads such as the Govic Highway are also commonly used by motorists to travel from Barangay Matain to Barangay Manggahan. The roads are meant to reduce traffic in the town proper and are used by trucks going north of Castillejos and vice versa.

Another main road is the Philseco Road that ends from Barangay Asinan proper down to Seatrium Subic Shipyard (formerly Keppel Subic Shipyard and Philippine Shipyard and Engineering Corporation). The Govic Highway Extension runs from Castillejos down to Hanjin Shipyard and is exclusively used by its workers.

=== Public Utilities ===
==== Electricity ====
Electricity services are provided by the cooperative-run Zambales II Electric Cooperative, Inc. (ZAMECO II) which covers an area from Subic all the way to Cabangan since 1972.

==== Water ====
Water services are provided by Subic Water District (SWD), not to be confused with Subic Water and Sewerage Company (Subic Water), which is a different water distribution company serving the neighboring city of Olongapo.

== Education ==
The Subic Schools District Office governs all educational institutions within the municipality. It oversees the management and operations of all private and public, from primary to secondary schools.

Most of private schools are operated by Catholic except for colleges.

=== Primary and elementary schools ===
- Agusuhin Elementary School
- Agusuhin Elementary School (Annex)
- Aningway-Sacatihan Elementary School
- Aningway-Sacatihan Elementary School (Annex)
- Batiawan Elementary School Annex
- Calapacuan Elementary School
- Cawag Elementary School
- Cawag Resettlement Elementary School
- Ilwas Elementary School
- Josephine F. Khonghun Special Education Center
- Kingsway Kiddie Learning Center
- Manggahan Elementary School
- Mangan-Vaca Elementary School
- Mapanao Elementary School
- Matain Elementary School
- Nagyantok Elementary School
- Pag-asa New Light Christian School
- P. O. C. Christian Academy
- Saint Francis Learning Center Foundation
- Saint Francis Learning Center Foundation (Annex)
- Saint Therese Academy
- San Isidro Elementary School
- Smart Achievers Academy
- St. Anne School
- St. Anthony's School of Matain
- St. James School of Subic
- Sta. Monica Educational Center for Excellence
- Sto. Tomas Elementary School
- Subic Central School
- Subic Ecumenical Learning Center
- Tibag Elementary School

=== Secondary schools ===
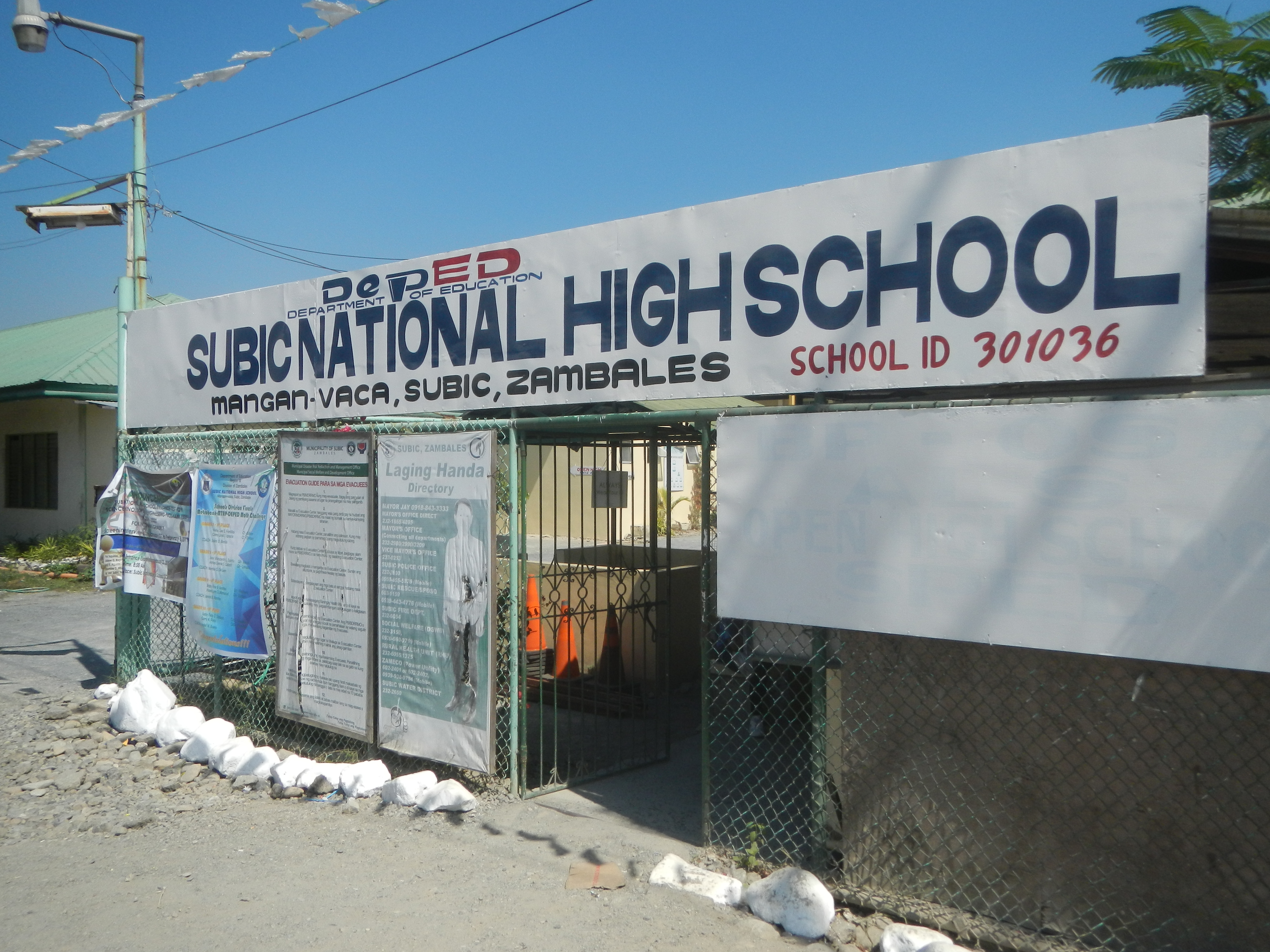
Subic National High School.

- Subic National High School
- Santo Tomas National High School
- Cawag High School (Resettlement School)
- Josephine F. Khonghun Special Education Center
- Agusuhin High School
- Nagyantok High School
- San Isidro High School
- Ilwas High School
- Aningway-Sacatihan High School
- Batiawan Integrated School
- Cabitaugan Integrated School
- Kinabuksan Integrated School
- Naugsol Integrated School
- Pamatawan Integrated School
- Calapandayan Intergrated School
- College of Subic Montessori
- Smart Achievers Academy Subic
- St. James School
- St. Anthony's School

=== Higher educational institutions ===
- Best Freeport College
- College of Subic Montessori
- Kolehiyo ng Subic (Public College)
- Metro Subic College

== See also ==
- Subic Bay Freeport Zone
