= Polytechnic University of the Philippines Bataan =

Public university in Bataan, Philippines

- Politeknikong Unibersidad ng Pilipinas Bataan (Filipino)
- Former names: National Shipyard and Steel Corporation Barrio High School (1966–1970); Mariveles Municipal High School (1970-1973); Bataan Export Processing Zone High School (1973-1976)
- Motto: Tanglaw ng Bayan
- Motto in English: Light of the Nation
- Type: Public
- Established: July 19, 1966; 60 years ago
- Academic affiliations: State Colleges and Universities Athletic Association; National Athletic Association of Schools, Colleges and Universities; Association of Southeast Asian Institutions of Higher Learning; Accrediting Agency of Chartered Colleges and Universities in the Philippines; International Association of Universities; Philippine Association of State Universities and Colleges
- President: Manuel M. Muhi
- Director: Rufo M. Bueza
- Location: Elliptical Road, Brgy. Malaya, Freeport Area of Bataan, Mariveles, Bataan, Philippines; 14°27′24″N 120°29′51″E
- Colors: Maroon and gold
- Mascot: Pylon
- Website: www.pup.edu.ph/bataan

- Location in Luzon Location in Philippines

Polytechnic University of the Philippines Bataan is a satellite campus of the Polytechnic University of the Philippines located in Elliptical Road, Brgy. Malaya, Freeport Area of Bataan (FAB), Mariveles, Bataan, Philippines. It was established on July 19, 1966, as National Shipyard and Steel Corporation Barrio High School and became a Branch college of PUP in Bataan ten years later on July 1, 1976.

== History ==
Upon the invitation of the Export Processing Authority, the Polytechnic University of the Philippines, then the Philippine College of Commerce (PCC) under the leadership of Pres. Isabelo T. Crisostomo, decided to establish a branch in Bataan Export Processing Zone (BEPZ) and henceforth created an ad hoc committee chaired by Dean Adelaida B. Zamora to resume negotiation with the Export Processing Zone Authority (EPZA) as regards establishing a branch of the college in Bataan. The project was meant not only to provide educational facilities to the children of residents of the community but also to respond to the call of the government for the dispersal of schools and decongestion of Metro Manila. This was also PCC's way of bringing quality education to the masses in the countryside.

The proposal to establish a PCC branch in BEPZ was approved by the EPZA Board of Commissioners in its meeting on June 16, 1976. This was subsequently approved by the PCC Board of Trustees during its meeting on June 19, 1976. The Export Processing Zone Authority through its Chairman-Administrator, Atty. Teodoro Q, Pena, assigned a three-hectare vacant lot in the center of the industrial sector for the temporary site of the Branch.

In 1981, BEPZ authorities transferred the University Branch to the former BEPZ Police Headquarters along Roman Superhighway, facing the BEPZ (now Authority of the Freeport Area of Bataan (AFAB) and Freeport Area of Bataan (FAB) since July 2010) administration building. The former PUP building was later converted to Mariveles District Hospital (MDH) in 2015 which was opened the following year in 2016.

The progenitor of the University Branch at the Bataan Export Processing Zone, in terms of buildings and secondary school personnel was the National Shipyard and Steel Corporation (NASSCO) Barrio High School, which was established on July 19, 1966, in NASSCO area through the efforts of Barrio Captain Manuel Basas. Four years later, in March 1970, the Mariveles Municipal Council enacted a resolution converting NASSCO Barrio High School to Mariveles Municipal High School.

On February 19, 1973, Bataan Export Processing Zone Authority took over the financing of the school and renamed it BEPZ High School. Later, financing and supervision were turned over to the Philippine College of Commerce. The formal opening of the Branch was made on July 1, 1976, with the presence of Zone Manager, Atty. Dioscorro Manrique and Pres. Isabelo T. Crisostomo, representing the Authority and the college, respectively. The Branch was placed under the overall supervision of Dean Adelaida B. Zamora, the first Officer-in-Charge of the Branch. After her death on August 4, 1978, Executive Dean Raymundo G. Garcia was designated Acting Officer-in-Charge.

On November 3, 1978, the authority and responsibility for the BEPZ Branch was turned over to Dr. Pedro P. Mendonez, who later resigned at the close of the Academic Year 1978–1979.

On May 16, 1979, Prof. Ramon L. Villena, Chief of the PUP Placement Office in Manila was appointed Director.

When Dr. Nemesio E. Pridente assumed the PUP Presidency on April 20, 1986, Dr. Mirriam A. Padolina was designated Branch Officer-in Charge on June 13, 1986.

On July 4, 1988, Dr. Samuel M. Salvador took over as Branch Director. He introduced corrective measures aimed at improving the administrative procedures and means of attaining efficiency in the delivery of services. Dr. Salvador was promoted and became the vice-president for Academic Affairs. Dr. Pedro Yunzal was designated Director on April 3, 1989. A creative researcher, he initiated the establishment of a Training and Research Center for students and faculty. In 1990, Dr. Romeo Q. Mendoza was given the authority to run the Branch but after a year, he went on an indefinite leave.

Dr. Amelia C. Lapira assumed directorship on August 1, 1992. She worked for the offering of the programs Master in Education Management – Distance Learning System and Bachelor in Secondary Education. Various physical improvements were made during her administration. She was also responsible for paving the way for PUP and PEZA to negotiate the donation of the former BEPZ Medical Center to PUP as the permanent site of the University Branch.

With the retirement from service of Dr. Amelia C. Lapira, Dr. Loreto V. Jao was installed as the Branch Director on October 12, 1999. It is during her incumbency that the transfer of PUP Bataan to its new and current site in Barangay Malaya and the former BEPZ Medical Center was facilitated. She subjected the newly renovated building to a complete face-lifting, focusing on cleanliness, proper maintenance and beautification. Rehabilitation of rooms to become the library, the audio-visual room, and the computer center was made during her term with the assistance of Cong. Enrique “Tet” Garcia and Sen. Ramon Magsaysay.

In 2005, Dr. Marietta Z. De Guzman assumed position of directorship upon retirement of Dr. Jao. But after a year, Prof. Thelma D. Escalada took over as the Branch Director. Through Prof. Escalada's efforts, the Provincial Government of Bataan grant started granting the tuition fee refund program with the undergraduate students. It was also during her term when the Speech Laboratory equipment was made available and the Bachelor of Elementary Education program was offered in the Branch.

After three years, PUP Bataan's responsibility was transferred under the leadership of Prof. Leonila J. Generales, the present Director of the Branch. During her first few months, the installation of the Speech Laboratory was finished and thirty (30) personal computers were donated by Gov. Enrique “Tet” Garcia. The Branch Library became a wi-fi zone, together with the Computer Laboratory.

For two years now, Liquigaz Philippines has been awarding scholarships to poor but deserving students. Also, an external linkage with GNPower Manufacturing Coal Plant, Inc. with regard to providing a one-year Entrepreneurship Training Program to the residents of different barangays has also been created beginning last year.

== Academics ==
College of Accountancy and Finance (CAF)

- Bachelor of Science in Accountancy (BSA)

College of Business Administration (CBA)

- Bachelor of Science in Entrepreneurial Management (BSEM)
- Bachelor of Science in Business Administration, Major in Human Resource Development Management (BSBA-HRDM).

College of Engineering (CE)

- Bachelor of Science in Industrial Engineering (BSIE)
- Bachelor of Science in Electronics and Communications Engineering (BSECE)

College of Computer and Information Sciences (CCIS)

- Bachelor of Science in Information Technology (BSIT)
- Diploma in Office Management Technology (DOMT)
- Diploma in Information and Communication Management Technology (DICMT)
- Diploma in communications engineering technology (DCET)

College of Education (COED)

- Bachelor of Business Teacher Education (BBTE)
- Bachelor of Secondary Education (BSEd)
- Bachelor of Elementary Education (BEEd)
- Post Baccalaureate in Teaching Education (PBTE)
