= Camaya =

Camaya may refer to the following places in the Philippines:

- Camaya Coast, beach resort
- Camaya Falls, collection of three waterfalls
