= World Plaza =

Office building in Taguig, Philippines

Coordinates: 14°33′11″N 121°02′52″E

World Plaza is a 27-storey office building in Bonifacio Global City (BGC), Philippines. It is a development of Daiichi Properties with Gensler, the team who also developed the Best Office Development in the Philippines at the Asia Pacific Property Awards, One World Place in 2011. World Plaza is a Class A building and a PEZA registered IT Park. It has 18 floors of typical office space, penthouse level, and mechanical deck floor.

== Location ==
World Plaza is located along 5th Avenue in the Crescent West District. It is located adjacent to the upcoming ArthaLand Tower and close to the new Shangri-La Hotel in BGC.

== Design and features ==
World Plaza's architectural height is 115 m / 377 ft and its height to tip is 115 m / 377 ft. Unlike typical building lots, World Plaza's location is triangular, seemingly rotated in a 90-degree angle.
