= One World Place =

Office building in Taguig, Philippines

- Interactive map of the One World Place area

General information
- Status: Completed
- Location: 32nd Street, Bonifacio Global City, Taguig, Philippines
- Coordinates: 14°33′11″N 121°03′12″E
- Opening: 2015

Technical details
- Floor count: 31

Design and construction
- Architect: Gensler
- Developer: Daiichi

One World Place is a 31-storey premium office building in Bonifacio Global City, Philippines. Developed by Daiichi and designed by Gensler, it was named "Five-Star" Best Office Development in the Philippines at the Asia Pacific Property Awards in 2013. One World Place is a Class A building and a PEZA registered IT Park. It has 31 floors, which will mainly consist of typical office space with some retail space. The building was completed in 2015.

== Location ==
One World Place is located along 32nd Avenue, close to the Bonifacio High Street, EcoTower and a few blocks away from main thoroughfares EDSA and C-5.

== Design and features ==
With an architectural height of 122 m, One World Place is the 7th tallest building in Bonifacio Global City. Currently a LEED-registered building, One World Place includes eco-friendly and high-performance features fit for a LEED Silver rating. It has a rainwater collection and graywater system to manage water consumption as well as daylighting, efficient insulated glass, and solar-reflective coating to lower electricity costs for tenants. It also has an earthquake-resistant design that lessens building impact in case the city gets hit by an earthquake.

One World Place's unique design innovation is the integration of 'monsoon windows' into the curtain wall facade. During rainy season, these windows allow outside air into the building to make the cooling system more efficient and ensure that all public spaces receive natural ventilation. According to Gensler, One World Place is the first commercial building in Southeast Asia to feature this concept.
