= Authority of the Freeport Area of Bataan =

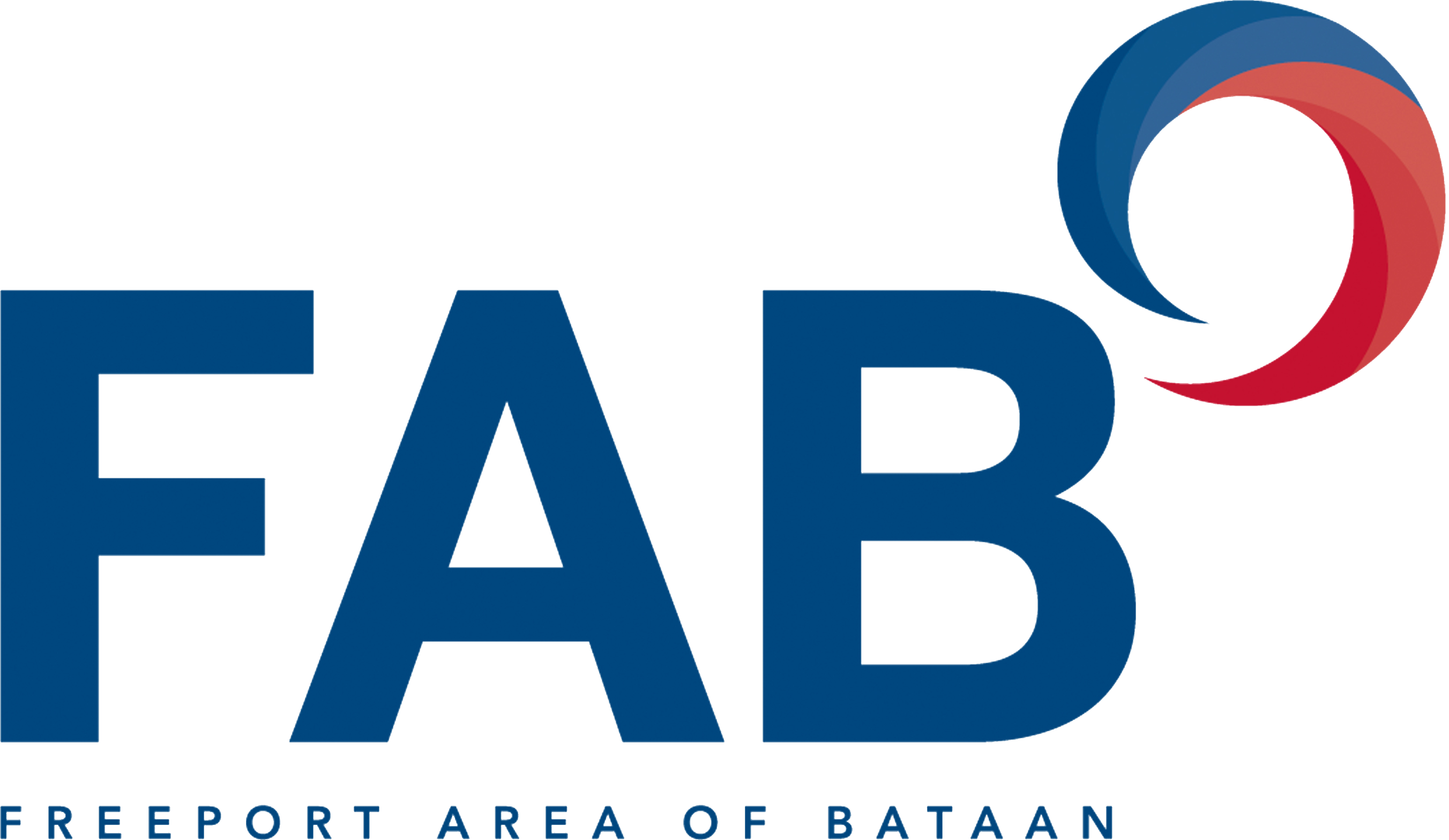
- Logo, used since April 2011

- Administration building

Agency overview
- Formed: February 2, 2010; 16 years ago
- Preceding agency: Philippine Economic Zone Authority (Note: The Philippine Economic Zone Authority (PEZA) continues to exist. It operated and managed the Bataan Economic Zone (BEZ) until the transfer of its operations and management to AFAB in July 2010, following which the BEZ was abolished. PEZA was preceded in this role by the Free Trade Zone Authority (FTZA) and the Export Processing Zone Authority (EPZA), which successively operated and managed the zone beginning June 21, 1969.)
- Jurisdiction: Freeport Area of Bataan, Barangays Malaya, Maligaya, Sisiman and Baseco Country, and FAB-covered portions of Alas-asin
- Headquarters: AFAB Administration Bldg., FAB, Mariveles, Bataan 2106; 14°26′N 120°29′E
- Agency executives: Mohammed Hussein Pangandaman, Administrator; Pablo M. Gancayco, Chairman
- Parent agency: Office of the President of the Philippines
- Website: afab.gov.ph

The Authority of the Freeport Area of Bataan (AFAB; Filipino: Pangasiwaan ng Bataan sa Lugar ng Malayang-daungan) is a government agency attached to the Office of the President of the Philippines that operates and manages the Freeport Area of Bataan (FAB) in Mariveles, Bataan, Philippines. It was established upon the effectivity of Republic Act No. 9728 on February 2, 2010.

The FAB was originally designed as an export processing zone. Its existing infrastructure includes 11 standard factory buildings, each with three stories and a total working area of 8,352 m^{2} (89,900 sq ft) per SFB. It is home to over 50 locators engaged in manufacturing products for export, ranging from tennis balls to yachts. Two locators use their facilities for warehousing, one is engaged in animal feed processing, and another is constructing a clean coal power plant. These enterprises employ a total of 13,443 workers.

The AFAB aims to revive the area and expand the Freeport. To achieve these objectives, it seeks to attract more locators in the manufacturing, business process outsourcing, electronics, and green industries, among others. It also seeks investors to enhance the Freeport's tourism capabilities by refurbishing its existing recreational facilities. The AFAB is also targeting new investors to build hotels, entertainment establishments, duty-free shops, resorts, team-building facilities, and sports facilities to encourage the influx of local and foreign tourists. It also hopes to attract a medical center to the Freeport to support medical tourism. Finally, it aims to encourage universities and colleges to establish campuses in the area and create and sustain a talent pool to meet the human resource needs of the locators.

== History ==
=== Prior history ===
Prior to the creation of BEPZ, the area where the freeport zone is currently located was formerly part of barangay Camaya and barrio of NASSCO (National Steel and Shipbuilding Company) under the jurisdiction of municipality of Mariveles, with the company later became under the United States-based General Dynamics. Barangays Malaya and Maligaya, the two barangays of Mariveles that are also under the jurisdiction of BEPZ, were formerly mountainous areas prior to the zone's creation.

During World War II, Bataan became a significant site of military operations in the Philippines. In April 1942, two towns in the Bataan province, Bagac and Mariveles, served as starting points of the infamous Bataan Death March, which ended in the Capas town in the province of Tarlac.

The war changed the tempo of life in Mariveles, relegating it to an economy of subsistence, where farmers heavily depended on the yield of the land and catch from the sea for their existence.

When NASSCO complex was set up in 1950, families of the Nassco workers began to inhabit a large piece of land which had been used by the US Navy as a base. NASSCO told the workers to stay where they like. Therefore, the NASSCO community was formed.

Until the late 1960s, Mariveles was largely underdeveloped. It had a rickety road network, with businesses centered mostly on sari-sari stores catering to the everyday needs of community residents. Farming and fishing remained the community's main source of income.

When President Marcos declared the establishment of BEPZ in Mariveles in order to hasten the hope for an industrialized Philippines, NASSCO inhabitants were requested to move out from the zone where they had been living for over 20 years and transfer to other parts of the municipality but they were not given proper places nearby and they received no compensation. Housing in Mariveles thus became overcrowded.

=== 1969–2010: Mariveles Free Trade Zone, and Bataan Export Processing Zone/Bataan Economic Zone ===
On June 21, 1969, Congressman Pablo Roman Sr. authored Republic Act 5490 designating Mariveles, Bataan as the first free trade zone in the Philippines. This created the Free Trade Zone Authority (FTZA), later became Export Processing Zone Authority (EPZA) and Philippine Economic Zone Authority (PEZA).

In early 1972, three congressmen — Roman, Roces, and Sarmiento - sponsored the bill to convert the free trade zone authority into government corporation. This would grant the power of a corporation combined with the coercive strength of the Philippine Government to move the project ahead, especially regarding the relocation of residents. The bill stalled in Congress due to the opposition of many members to the vested interests involved.

On November 20, 1972, the Bataan Export Processing Zone (BEPZ) became the first official economic zone in the Philippines through Presidential Decree 66. The BEPZ was one of the most progressive communities in Luzon during its first decade of operation. The area attracted over one hundred multinational locators.

In 1976, Mattel established a wholly owned subsidiary called Mattel Philippines, Inc. within BEPZ to minimize expenses, notably in manufacturing. Barbie dolls, as well as some of the dolls' clothes and accessories, were manufactured at the factory and subsequently distributed to various countries across the world.

However, in the 90s to 2000s BEPZ (now renamed as Bataan Economic Zone or BEZ after the enactment of Republic Act 7916 in February 1995) stagnated and declined after it was outcompeted by two newly formed freeport zones from the remnants of American bases in nearby Clark and Subic Bay. RA 7916 also led to the change from EPZA to Philippine Economic Zone Authority (PEZA).

To put a halt to BEZ's decline and allow the zone to fulfill its original mandate to become a catalyst for progress and development in the region, Bataan 2nd District Congressman Albert S. Garcia and Senator Loren Legarda authored a bill for the conversion of Bataan Economic Zone into a freeport and creation of the Authority of the Freeport Area of Bataan (AFAB). On May 6 and June 6, 2008, the consultative meeting on House Bill 1425 and Senate Bill 2118 known as Bataan Special Economic Zone and Freeport Act of 2008 was held. Legarda said that the conversion to a freeport zone will generate more investment for Bataan. It also helps to address the government's efforts of creating 2 million jobs per year to be able to neutralize the rate of unemployment in the country.

The Philippine Congress then passed the Freeport Area of Bataan Act (Republic Act 9728), which was signed into law on October 23, 2009.

From November to December 2009, BEZ held its last BEZ Trade Fair as one of the remaining plans and programs of PEZA on the zone.

In 2010, the question "Are you ready for the FAB?" is printed on signboards posted in various parts of Bataan, referring to the preparation for a turnover of the zone's operations and management from PEZA to AFAB.

PEZA passed the zone's documents to AFAB at 1:25 pm to phase out those that are related to the zone's operations and management under PEZA by the latter on June 29, 2010.

In July 2010, one month after the end of the administration of President Gloria Macapagal Arroyo and her successor Benigno Aquino III became President of the Philippines, the zone was converted from BEPZ/BEZ to FAB and turned over from PEZA to AFAB upon phasing out all of its documents relating to PEZA by the latter within the said month which abolished the BEPZ/BEZ names, ended the 41-year PEZA involvement over the zone, and marked the effectivity of RA 9728. Upon these, the zone's workers are no longer with PEZA and now called as FAB workers under AFAB, consolidating those that were started pre and post-conversion and turnover.

=== 2010–present: Freeport Area of Bataan ===
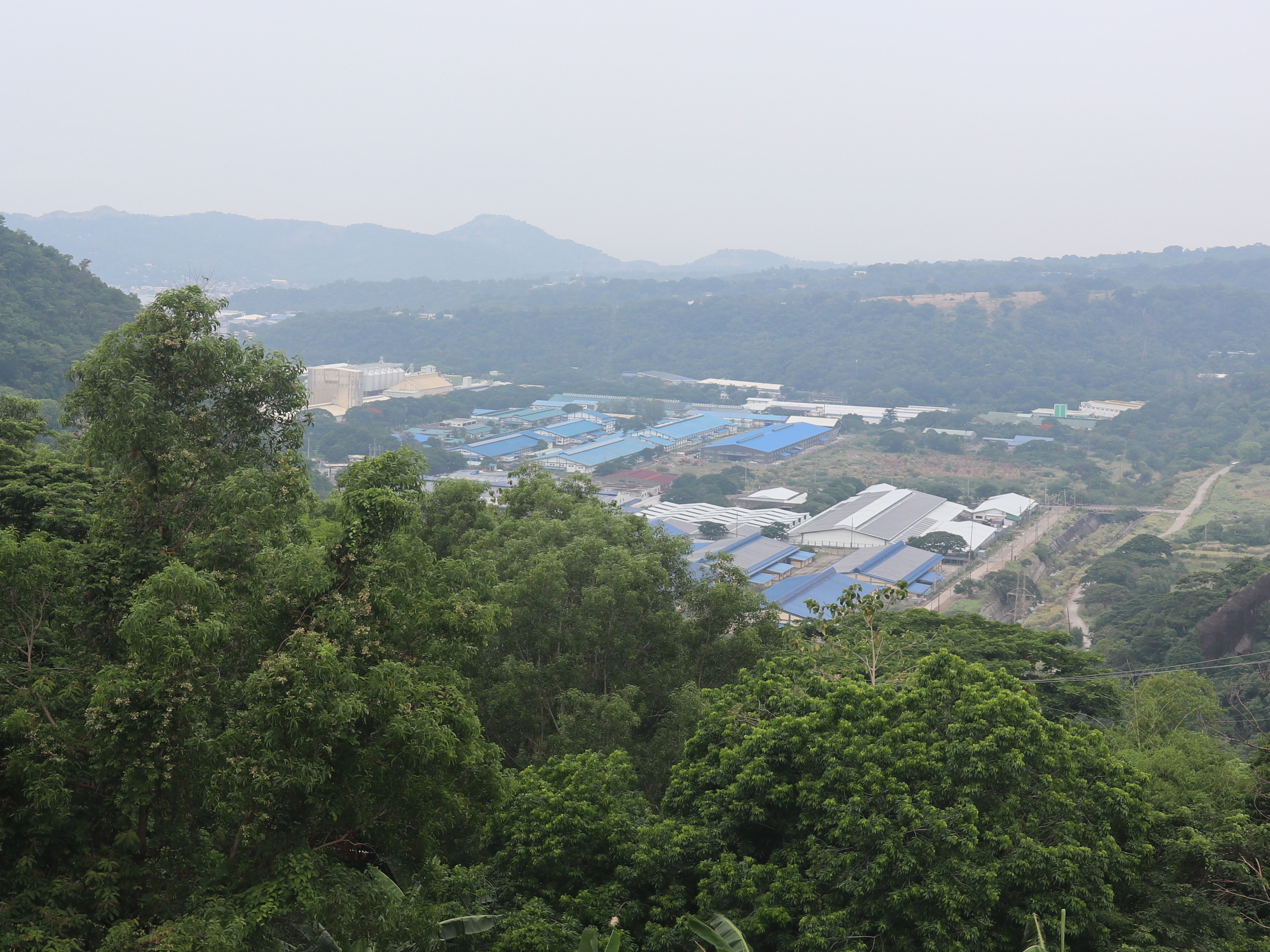
The freeport in 2023.

Deogracias G.P. Custodio became the first AFAB chairman and administrator in July 2010 after being appointed by President Gloria Macapagal Arroyo on March 4, 2010, during the then-imminent transition from PEZA to AFAB and BEPZ/BEZ to FAB.

To reflect the turnover of the zone's operations and management from PEZA to AFAB and the subsequent abolishment of BEPZ/BEZ two months earlier on June 29 and 30, 2010, AFAB removed the PEZA and BEZ name and logo on the zone's administration building and a welcome sign along Roman Superhighway which made the red part of the BEPZ/BEZ/PEZA logo became all blue at the fourth week of August 2010 as one of the projects of AFAB made during its first few months of operation and management over the zone and then the said logo was next to be removed by placing a cement on a part of the building where the logo is in 2012.

Despite the turnover of the zone from PEZA to AFAB, there are still traces and references of BEPZ/BEZ and PEZA still left that were not yet removed, such as on some signages found on Mariveles Zigzag Road and on a newer welcome sign located after the zone's another sign with a guard house along the said highway. The BEZ sticker is still effective until FAB started to issue its own sticker in March 2011 which succeeded the former. FAB initially had 39 enterprises and 12,777 workers by the time of conversion of the zone from BEZ to FAB and turnover of the zone's operations and management from PEZA to AFAB which inherited from its predecessor BEZ.

In October 2010, FAB launched its website as part of the first anniversary of signing of RA 9728.

From November 8 to December 23, 2010, FAB held its first FAB Fair named "FAB Fair '10: FAB on the Rise!". FAB Fair succeeded BEZ Trade Fair as a result of the turnover of the zone's operations and management from PEZA to AFAB.

AFAB started to issue FAB stickers in March 2011 used to enter the zone's premises which succeeded the BEZ sticker that were printed until July 2010 with the latter has been in use until 2011. Also on that same month, the agency also established FAB Ferry, providing passengers from the municipality and freeport zone a faster travel to Metro Manila. However, it was abandoned in 2012 but later revived six years later in 2018 under the name FAB Town Terminal with its administration was later transferred from AFAB to 1Bataan Integrated Transport System, Inc. in 2019.

In April 2011, AFAB demolished the wall at the front of Standard Factory Building to give way to its opening to the public starting with the freeport's duty-free shop named HMB Half Moon Bay opened on May 10, 2011. This was followed by Hap Chan Mariveles on March 6 of the following year and Softnet Information Technology Center (SITC) in 2012 with the latter formerly at the basement level of the zone's administration building, and Twenty Oaks Supermarket and Department Store (now closed).

In 2012, the FAB registered the highest increase in employment generation among Investment Promotion Agencies (IPAs) after posting the highest growth rate, with PhP 390.6 million worth of investments, expanding by more than four times the PhP 86.0 million approved in 2011.

From 2015 to 2019, AFAB constructed a road and its annex building at a vacant area near Riprap River to accommodate its government employees in case the older main administration building become congested.

AFAB held its first State of the Freeport Address (SOFA) at the Bataan Convention Center on October 23, 2018, coinciding with the agency's 9th anniversary.

On August 30, 2019, President Rodrigo Duterte signed Republic Act 11453, amending the provisions of RA 9728, and further strengthening the powers and functions of AFAB, enabling the freeport to expand its operation anywhere within the province of Bataan.

FAB Central Terminal, the freeport's terminal, was constructed for eight months from April 7 to December 7, 2022.

Currently, FAB is the third largest freeport zone in the country based in the number of investors and employment created, behind Clark Freeport and Subic Freeport. The value of exported products reached more than US$1.05-billion for the year 2023 from the 44 manufacturers operating in the freeport, employing roughly 40,000 personnels. In addition, in a report released by Commission on Audit (Philippines), FAB is among the top ten GOCCs (Government-owned and controlled corporations with PhP 43.68 billion income, topping all other freeports in the country. The various products produced are leather goods, electronic components, textile, sports and outdoor apparels, formed rubber and plastic products, medical personal protective equipment, fabricated metals, animal feeds, marine vessels, refined petroleum, petrochemicals and optical lenses. The tennis balls used in the Wimbledon Grand Slam are made in FAB.

FAB is also an emerging hub for fintech and blockchain businesses in the Philippines hosting a number of these companies.

== Logo ==
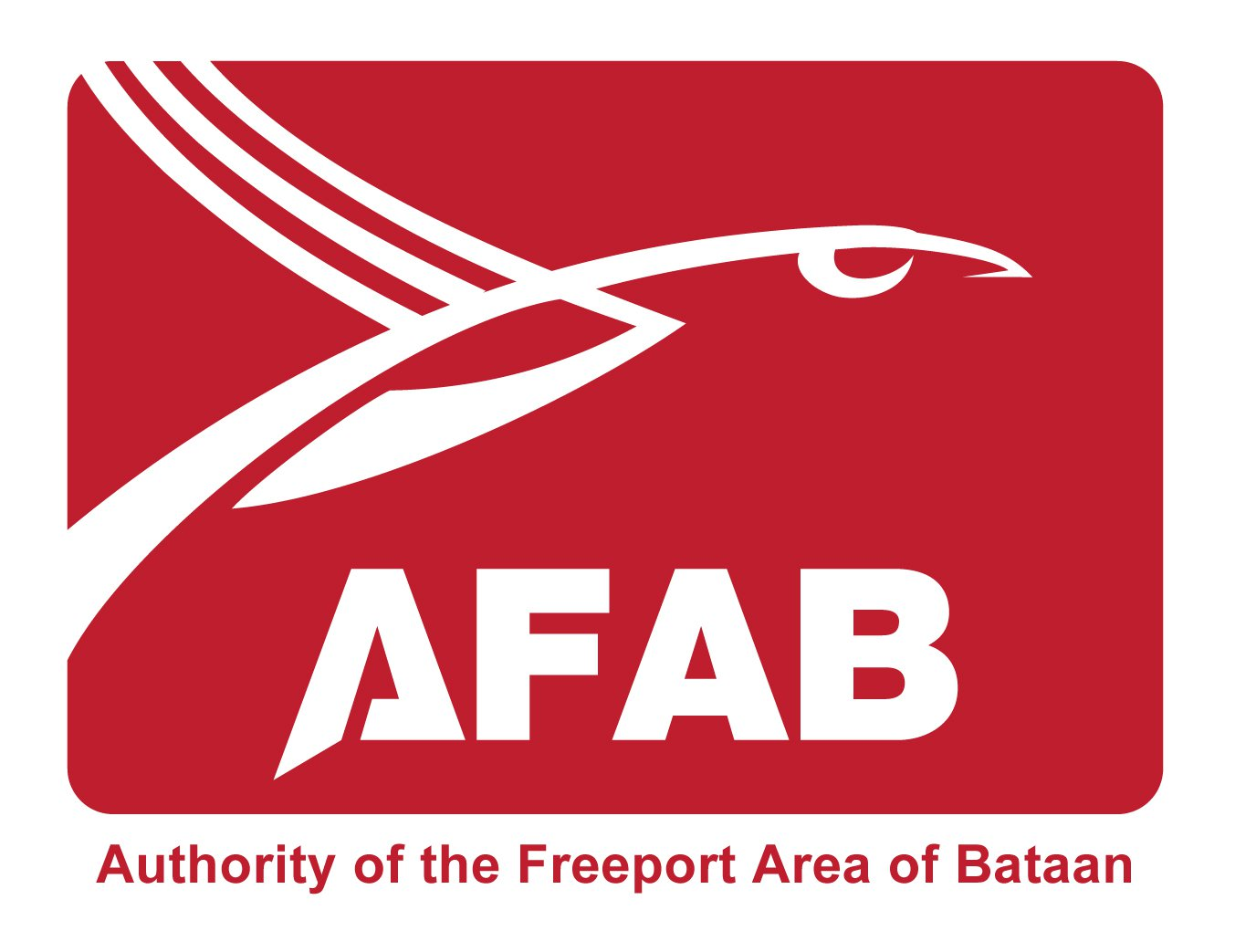
First logo of Authority of the Freeport Area of Bataan (AFAB), used from July 2010 to June 2014.

The first logo of AFAB, used from its creation due to the turnover of the zone's operations and management from PEZA to AFAB and the subsequent abolishment of BEPZ/BEZ in July 2010 to June 2014 with what the phoenix on the logo symbolizes - a rebirth of sorts. It was concurrently used with the 2011 FAB logo until June 2014 and only on the freeport zone's stickers released from March to December 2011.

The second and current logo of AFAB, used since April 2011, features the FAB in blue text with red and blue swirl or spiral on the upper-right of the text, and the text "Freeport Area of Bataan" below. The swirl or spiral of the logo symbolizes growth, swirl's interlocking parts represents trade and partnership, and red and blue are reminiscent of national pride, with red exudes determination, passion and strength, and blue depicts stability and depth. This logo is currently used on the freeport zone's administration building and stickers since January 2012.

== Administration ==
The Authority of the Freeport Area of Bataan (AFAB) is headed by a chairperson, duly-elected from a 9-member AFAB Board of Directors (AFAB BOD), and an Administrator that oversees the day-to-day operations of the AFAB. The Administrator is also considered as a director and a member of the AFAB BOD, but shall in no case be, elected as the Chairperson or vice-chairperson of the AFAB BOD. Each Board member represents a sector that is vital to the growth and development of the FAB. All members, including the chairperson and the administrator, are appointed by the President of the Philippines.

The AFAB may grant to its FAB Registered Enterprises incentives under Republic Act No. 11534 or the Corporate Recovery and Tax Incentives for Enterprises Act (CREATE).

Name	Term	Position	President/s
Deogracias G.P. Custodio	July 2010 – October 10, 2016	Chairman and Administrator	Benigno Aquino III; Rodrigo Duterte
Emmanuel D. Pineda	October 10, 2016 – May 9, 2023	Chairman (2016–2020); Administrator (2016–2023)	Rodrigo Duterte; Bongbong Marcos
Atty. Pablo M. Gancayco	March 6, 2020 – present	Chairman	Rodrigo Duterte; Bongbong Marcos
Mohammed Hussein Pangandaman	May 9, 2023 – present	Administrator	Bongbong Marcos

== See also ==
- Philippine Economic Zone Authority, AFAB's predecessor agency in zone's operations and management as Mariveles Free Trade Zone/Bataan Export Processing Zone/Bataan Economic Zone (FTZ/BEPZ/BEZ) from June 1969 to July 2010
- Albert Garcia
- Camaya Coast
- Subic Bay Metropolitan Authority
