= Freeport Area of Bataan =

- Freeport and special economic zone
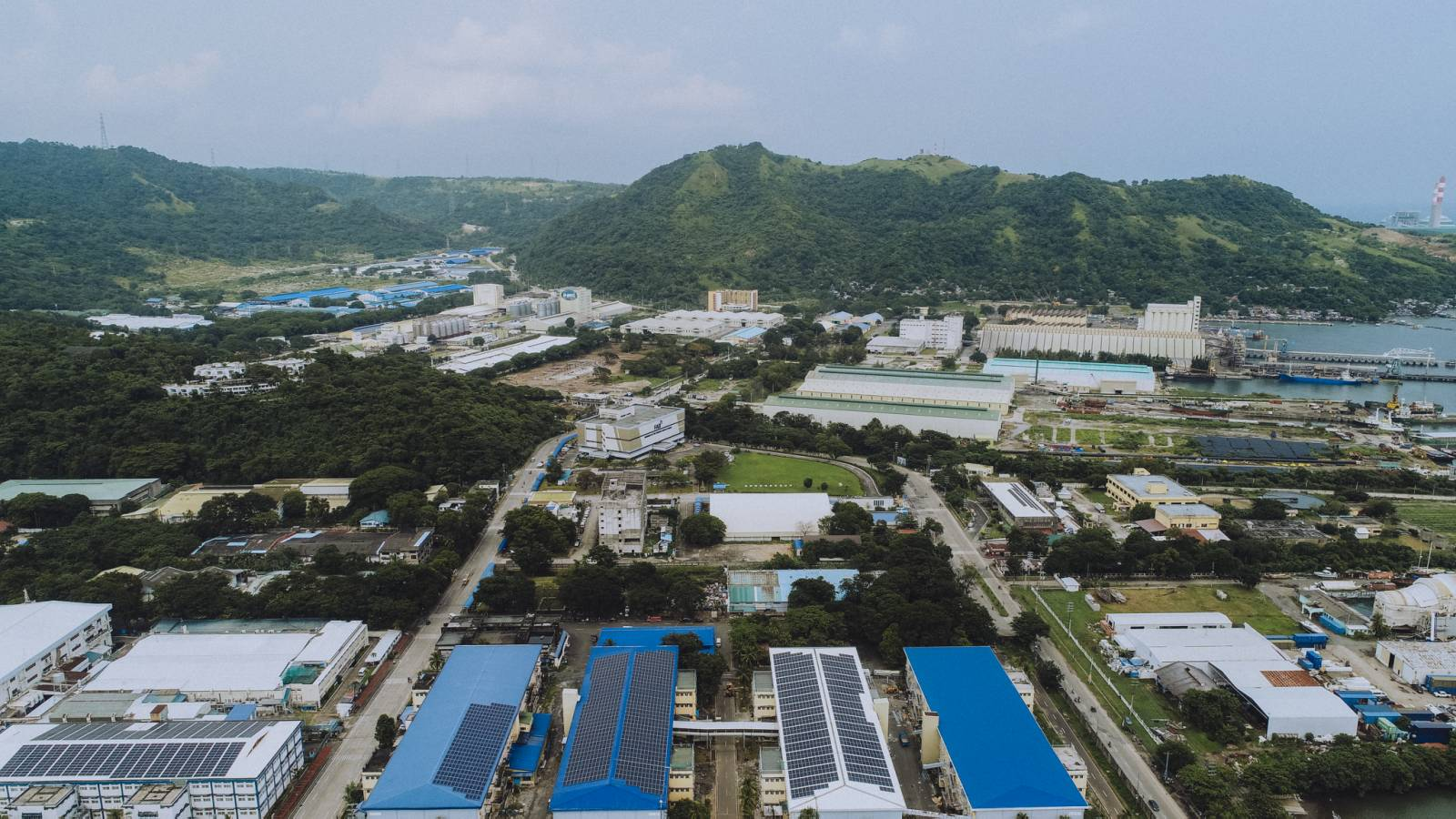
- Freeport Area of Bataan

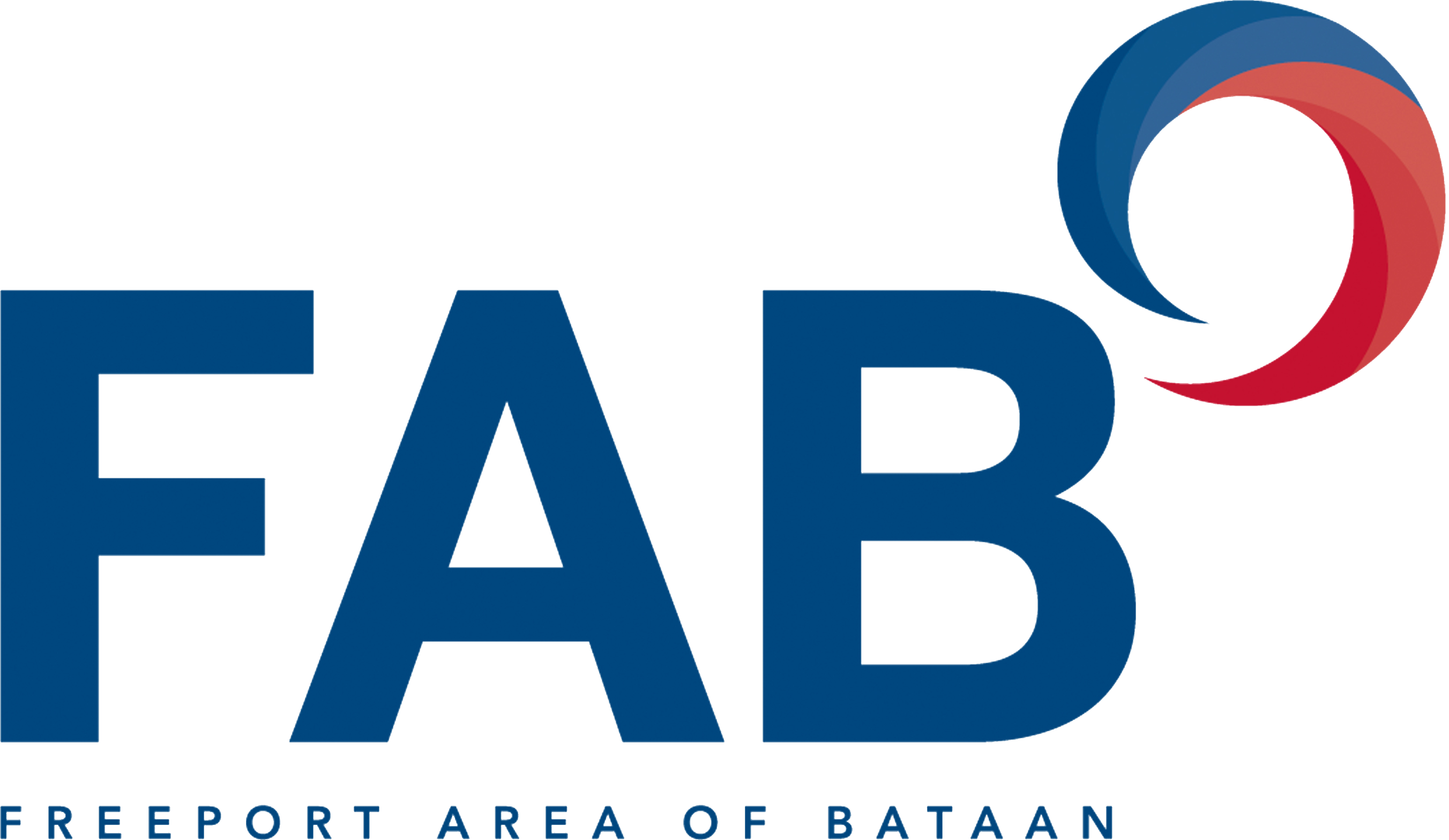

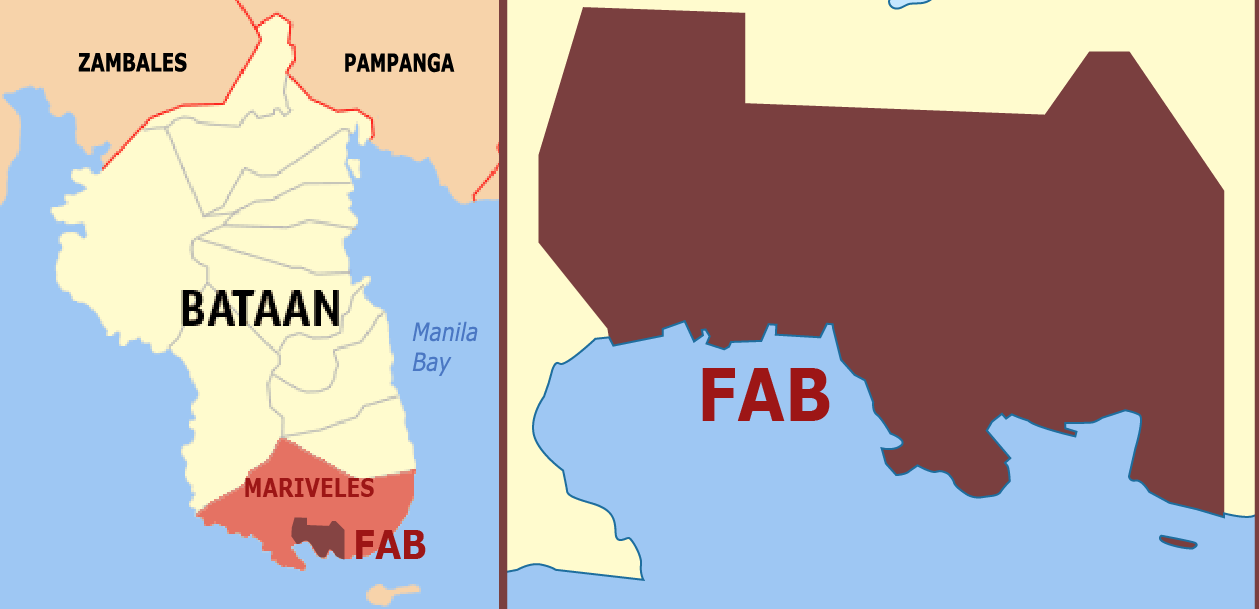
- Interactive map of Freeport Area of Bataan
- Location in Luzon Location in the Philippines
- Coordinates: 14°26′26.9″N 120°30′53.7″E
- Country: Philippines
- Region: Central Luzon (Region III)
- Province: Bataan
- Municipality: Mariveles
- Managing entity: Philippine Economic Zone Authority (June 21, 1969–July 2010); Authority of the Freeport Area of Bataan (July 2010–present)
- Established: June 21, 1969; 57 years ago
- Converted to freeport zone: July 2010; 16 years ago
- Disestablished: July 2010; 16 years ago (Mariveles Free Trade Zone, and Bataan Export Processing Zone/Bataan Economic Zone)
- Time zone: UTC+8 (PST)
- ZIP code: 2105 (Mariveles), 2106 (Freeport Area of Bataan)
- Catholic diocese: Diocese of Balanga (Sto. Niño Alas-asin Parish, Our Lady of Fatima Chaplaincy, and Diocesan Shrine and Parish of St. Nicholas de Tolentino Parish)
- Website: afab.gov.ph

The Freeport Area of Bataan (FAB), formerly known as Mariveles Free Trade Zone from June 21, 1969, to November 20, 1972, and Bataan Export Processing Zone (BEPZ) or Bataan Economic Zone (BEZ) from November 20, 1972, to July 2010), is a special economic zone in Mariveles, Bataan, Philippines. It was envisioned by Congressman Pablo Roman Sr., a representative from Bataan, who authored Republic Act 5490 and President of the Philippines Ferdinand Marcos through his approval designating the said location as the first free trade zone in the Philippines. It is also the second freeport zone in the province since July 2010, after Subic Special Economic and Freeport Zone in Hermosa and Morong.

== History ==
=== Prior history ===
Prior to the creation of BEPZ, the area where the freeport zone is currently located was formerly part of barangay Camaya and barrio of NASSCO (National Steel and Shipbuilding Company) under the jurisdiction of municipality of Mariveles, with the company became later under the United States-based General Dynamics. Barangays Malaya and Maligaya, the two barangays of Mariveles that are also under the jurisdiction of BEPZ, were formerly mountainous areas prior to the zone's creation.

World War II marked Bataan as a significant site in the history of the war. The area became one of two starting points of the Bataan Death March, during which thousands of Filipino soldiers and hundreds of American soldiers died.

In April 1942, the infamous Bataan Death March began—from the towns of Bagac and Mariveles in Bataan province to Capas town in the province of Tarlac.

The war changed the tempo of life in Mariveles, relegating it to an economy of subsistence, where farmers heavily depended on the yield of the land and catch from the sea for their existence.

When NASSCO complex was set up in 1950, families of the Nassco workers began to inhabit a large piece of land which had been used by the US Navy as a base. NASSCO told the workers to stay where they like. Therefore, the NASSCO community was formed.

Until the late 1960s, Mariveles was largely underdeveloped. It had a rickety road network, with businesses centered mostly on sari-sari stores catering to the everyday needs of community residents. Farming and fishing remained the community's main source of income.

When President Marcos declared the establishment of BEPZ in Mariveles in order to hasten the hope for an industrialized Philippines, NASSCO inhabitants were requested to move out from the zone where they had been living for over 20 years and transfer to other parts of the municipality but they were not given proper places nearby and they received no compensation. Housing in Mariveles thus became overcrowded.

=== 1969–2010: Mariveles Free Trade Zone, and Bataan Export Processing Zone/Bataan Economic Zone ===
On June 21, 1969, Congressman Pablo Roman Sr. authored Republic Act 5490 designating Mariveles, Bataan as the first free trade zone in the Philippines. This created the Free Trade Zone Authority (FTZA), later became Export Processing Zone Authority (EPZA) and Philippine Economic Zone Authority (PEZA). It was signed by President Ferdinand Marcos.

In early 1972, three congressmen — Roman, Roces, and Sarmiento - sponsored the bill to convert the free trade zone authority into government corporation. This would grant the power of a corporation combined with the coercive strength of the Philippine Government to move the project ahead, especially regarding the relocation of residents. The bill stalled in Congress due to the opposition of many members to the vested interests involved.

On November 20, 1972, the Bataan Export Processing Zone (BEPZ) became the first official economic zone in the Philippines through Presidential Decree 66. The BEPZ was one of the most progressive communities in Luzon during its first decade of operation. The area attracted over one hundred multinational locators.

In 1976, Mattel established a wholly owned subsidiary called Mattel Philippines, Inc. within BEPZ to minimize expenses, notably in manufacturing. Barbie dolls, as well as some of the dolls' clothes and accessories, were manufactured at the factory and subsequently distributed to various countries across the world.

However, in the 1990s to 2000s BEPZ (now renamed as Bataan Economic Zone or BEZ after the enactment of Republic Act 7916 in February 1995) stagnated and declined after it was outcompeted by two newly formed freeport zones from the remnants of American bases in nearby Clark and Subic Bay. RA 7916 also led to the change from EPZA to Philippine Economic Zone Authority (PEZA).

To put a halt to BEZ's decline and allow the zone to fulfill its original mandate to become a catalyst for progress and development in the region, Bataan 2nd District Congressman Albert S. Garcia and Senator Loren Legarda authored a bill for the conversion of Bataan Economic Zone into a freeport and creation of the Authority of the Freeport Area of Bataan (AFAB). On May 6 and June 6, 2008, the consultative meeting on House Bill 1425 and Senate Bill 2118 known as Bataan Special Economic Zone and Freeport Act of 2008 was held. Legarda said that the conversion to a freeport zone will generate more investment for Bataan. It also helps to address the government's efforts of creating 2 million jobs per year to be able to neutralize the rate of unemployment in the country.

The Philippine Congress then passed the Freeport Area of Bataan Act (Republic Act 9728), which was enacted into law on October 23, 2009, by President Gloria Macapagal Arroyo.

From November to December 2009, BEZ held its last BEZ Trade Fair.

In July 2010, one month after the end of Arroyo administration and Benigno Aquino III became president, the zone was converted from BEPZ/BEZ to FAB and turned over from PEZA to AFAB when the latter already phased out all the documents relating to PEZA within the said month. This abolished the BEPZ/BEZ names, ended the 41-year PEZA involvement over the zone, and marked the effectivity of RA 9728. Upon these, the zone's workers are now referred to as FAB workers of AFAB and no longer BEPZ/BEZ under PEZA which consolidated those that were started as the latter and former when the law became effective.

=== 2010–present: Freeport Area of Bataan ===
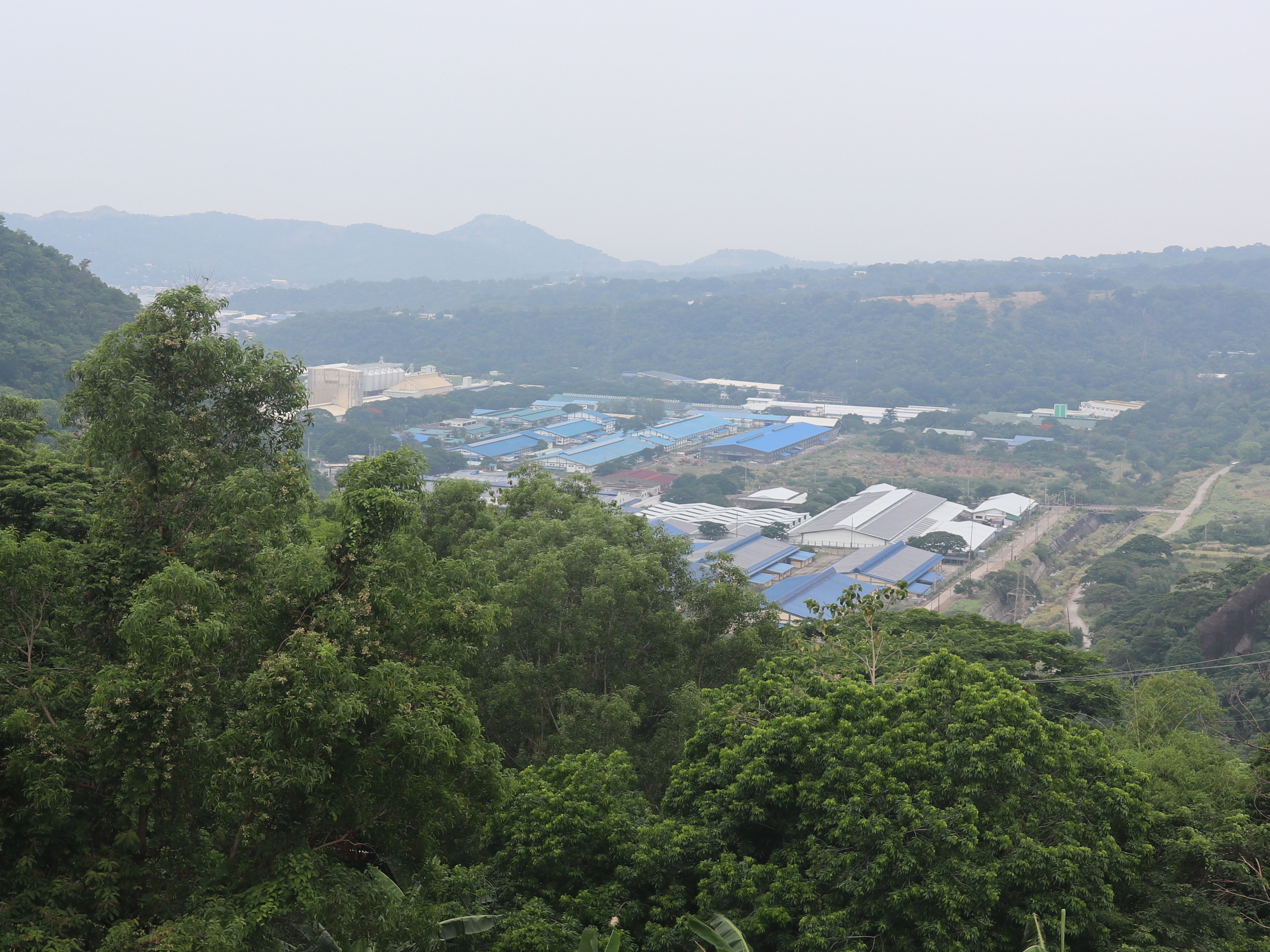
The freeport in 2023.

Deogracias G.P. Custodio became the first AFAB chairman and administrator in July 2010 after being appointed by President Gloria Macapagal Arroyo on March 4, 2010, during the then-imminent transition from BEPZ/BEZ to FAB and PEZA to AFAB.

To reflect the turnover of the zone's operations and management from PEZA to AFAB and the subsequent abolishment of BEPZ/BEZ one month earlier, AFAB removed the PEZA and BEZ name and logo on the zone's administration building and a welcome sign along Roman Superhighway which made the red part of the BEPZ/BEZ/PEZA logo became all blue at the fourth week of August 2010 as one of the projects of AFAB made during its first few months of operation and management over the zone and then the said logo was next to be removed by placing a cement on a part of the building where the logo is in 2012.

Despite the turnover of the zone from PEZA to AFAB, there are still traces and references of BEPZ/BEZ and PEZA still left that were not yet removed, such as on some signages found on Mariveles Zigzag Road and on a newer welcome sign located after the zone's another sign with a guard house along the said highway. The BEZ sticker is still effective until FAB started to issue its own sticker in March 2011 which succeeded the former. FAB initially had 39 enterprises and 12,777 workers by the time of conversion of the zone from BEZ to FAB and turnover of the zone's operations and management from PEZA to AFAB which inherited from its predecessor BEZ.

In October 2010, FAB launched its website to commemorate the first anniversary of signing of RA 9728.

From November 8 to December 23, 2010, FAB held its first FAB Fair named "FAB Fair '10: FAB on the Rise!". FAB Fair succeeded BEZ Trade Fair as a result of the turnover of the zone's operations and management from PEZA to AFAB.

Since March 2011, FAB issues its sticker to enter the zone's premises which succeeded the BEZ sticker that were printed until July 2010 with the latter has been in use until 2011. Also on that same month, FAB Ferry was also established, providing passengers from the municipality and freeport zone a faster travel to Metro Manila. However, it was abandoned in 2012 but later revived six years later in 2018 under the name FAB Town Terminal with its administration was later transferred from AFAB to 1Bataan Integrated Transport System, Inc. in 2019.

In April 2011, the wall at the front of Standard Factory Building 8 was demolished to give way to its opening to the public starting with the freeport's duty-free shop named HMB Half Moon Bay opened on May 10, 2011. This was followed by Hap Chan Mariveles on March 6 of the following year and Softnet Information Technology Center (SITC) in 2012 with the latter formerly at the basement level of the zone's administration building, and Twenty Oaks Supermarket and Department Store (now closed).

In 2012, the FAB registered the highest increase in employment generation among Investment Promotion Agencies (IPAs) after posting the highest growth rate, with PhP 390.6 million worth of investments, expanding by more than four times the PhP 86.0 million approved in 2011.

From 2015 to 2019, a vacant area near Riprap River was developed to give way to the construction of FAB's annex building and its road. The said building is to accommodate increasing AFAB government employees in case the older main administration building is congested.

FAB held its first State of the Freeport Address (SOFA) at the Bataan Convention Center on October 23, 2018, coinciding with the 9th anniversary of RA 9728's signing.

On August 30, 2019, President Rodrigo Duterte signed Republic Act 11453, amending the provisions of RA 9728, and further strengthening the powers and functions of AFAB, enabling the freeport to expand its operation anywhere within the province of Bataan.

The freeport's terminal, named FAB Central Terminal, was constructed for eight months from its groundbreaking ceremony on April 7 to opening on December 7, 2022.

Currently, FAB is the third largest freeport zone in the country based in the number of investors and employment created, behind Clark Freeport and Subic Freeport. The value of exported products reached more than US$1.05-billion for the year 2023 from the 44 manufacturers operating in the freeport, employing roughly 40,000 personnels. In addition, in a report released by Commission on Audit (Philippines), FAB is among the top ten GOCCs (Government-owned and controlled corporations) with PhP 43.68 billion income, topping all other freeports in the country. The various products produced are leather goods, electronic components, textile, sports and outdoor apparels, formed rubber and plastic products, medical personal protective equipment, fabricated metals, animal feeds, marine vessels, refined petroleum, petrochemicals and optical lenses. The tennis balls used in the Wimbledon Grand Slam are made in FAB.

FAB is also an emerging hub for fintech and blockchain businesses in the Philippines hosting a number of these companies.

== Logo ==
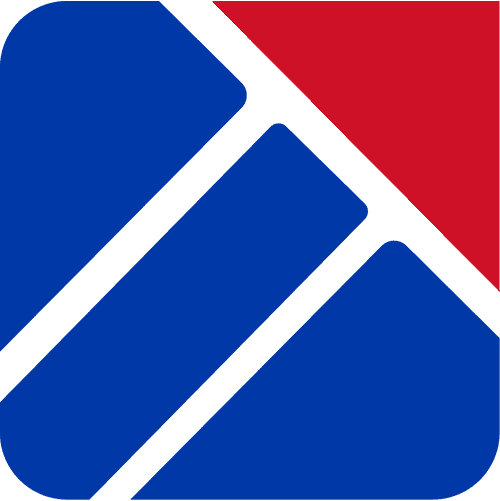
Logo as Bataan Export Processing Zone/Bataan Economic Zone (November 20, 1972–July 2010 (when the zone was named BEPZ/BEZ and under PEZA management), 2011 (stickers used to enter the zone's premises), 2012 (administration building), and present (overall usage/remaining traces left)).

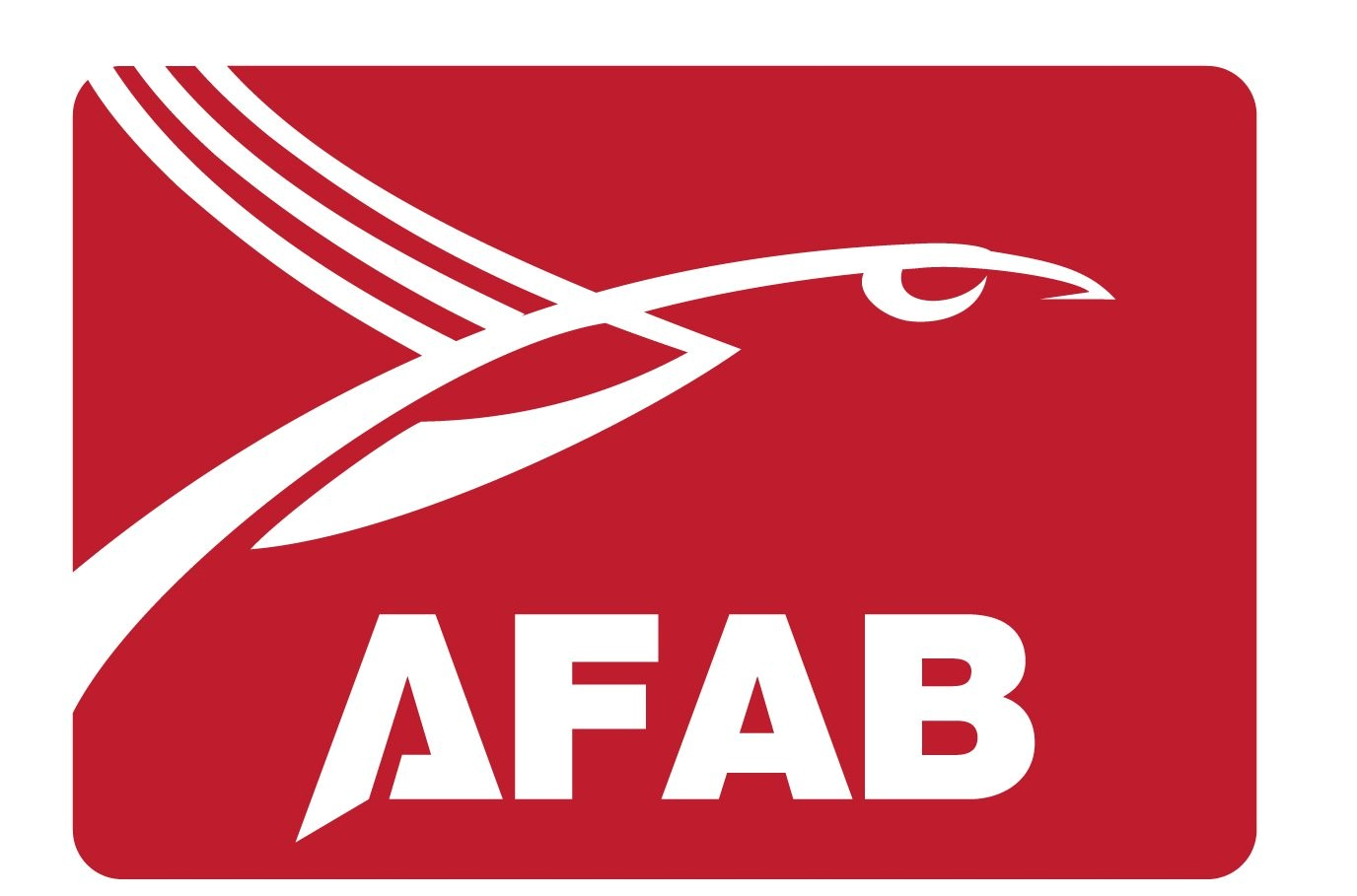
First logo as Freeport Area of Bataan (July 2010–June 2014).

Before the abolishment of BEPZ/BEZ and turnover of the zone from Philippine Economic Zone Authority (PEZA) to Authority of the Freeport Area of Bataan (AFAB) in July 2010, the zone used the logo of PEZA. Despite the conversion from BEPZ/BEZ to FAB which abolished the former and turnover from PEZA to AFAB on a said month of 2010, there are still traces and references of BEPZ/BEZ still left, such as on some signages found on Mariveles Zigzag Road and on a welcome sign located after the zone's another sign with a guard house along Roman Superhighway. This logo was also used on stickers to enter the zone's premises until FAB started to issue its own sticker which succeeded the BEZ sticker and administration building in 2011 and 2012, respectively.

The first logo as FAB, used from the turnover and conversion in July 2010 to June 2014, featured a phoenix symbol which symbolizes them - a rebirth of sorts, and AFAB text on a red rectangle. It was concurrently used with the 2011 FAB logo until June 2014 and only on the freeport zone's stickers released within 2011.

The second and current logo of FAB, used since April 2011, features the FAB in blue text with red and blue swirl or spiral on the upper-right of the text, and the text "Freeport Area of Bataan" below. The swirl or spiral of the logo symbolizes growth, swirl's interlocking parts represents trade and partnership, and red and blue are reminiscent of national pride, with red exudes determination, passion and strength, and blue depicts stability and depth. This logo is currently used on the administration building and stickers since 2012. The logo's blue and red colors also reflect that the zone was inherited from BEPZ/BEZ/PEZA, with BEPZ/BEZ being the zone's former name and PEZA as its operator until the turnover of operations and management of the zone to AFAB in July 2010 that led to the abolishment of BEPZ/BEZ.

== Location ==
The freeport zone is located in a cove at the southern tip of the Bataan Peninsula about 172.3 kilometers from Manila, accessible via the network of expressways which are STAR Tollway, South Luzon Expressway (SLEx), Metro Manila Skyway, and North Luzon Expressway (NLEX) from Batangas City, Batangas to San Fernando, Pampanga, Jose Abad Santos Avenue (Olongapo-Gapan Road) from San Fernando to Dinalupihan, Bataan or from NLEX in Mabalacat, Subic–Clark–Tarlac Expressway (SCTEx) until Dinalupihan, and Roman Superhighway from Dinalupihan to Mariveles, and is linked to the province's another freeport zone Subic Special Economic and Freeport Zone in Morong through Mariveles–Bagac Road, Gov J.J. Linao Road, UN Avenue and SBMA–Morong Road until the latter's gate that also provides alternative access to Zambales (Olongapo) from Bataan (Morong) through the provincial boundary of both provinces located within the premises of SBFZ.

The primary host town Mariveles has a total land area of 153.9 km^{2} or 1,742.48 hectares (4,305.8 acres) representing 12% of the total land area of Bataan. Of this, about 35% consist of the pastureland, 4.6% of forestland, 3.8% agricultural lands and the remaining 6% for residential and industrial use. It is home to a Filipino community speaking a called Mariveleño. According to the 2020 census, it has a population of 149,879 people.

Agricultural resources include rice, mangoes, legumes, vegetables and coffee. It also has aquatic resources like round scads, grouper, mussel, and abalone; mineral deposits of granite and basalt and forest products like vines and bamboo.

== Scope ==
Freeport zone's administration building

The freeport area originally covers five barangays of Mariveles namely Barangays Maligaya (Pizarro), Malaya (Quadro), Sisiman, Baseco Country, and FAB-covered portions of Alasasin, however since August 2019 after the enactment of R.A. No. 11453, FAB is given the power to include the remaining areas of Mariveles and further expand to any area inside Bataan excluding the Hermosa and Morong portions of Subic Special Economic and Freeport Zone, another freeport zone located within the province and under the Subic Bay Metropolitan Authority (SBMA), as defined by R.A. No. 7227. Before an area can be declared a freeport expansion zone, it will be subjected to the concurrence of affected local government units and the approval of appropriate national government agencies, government owned and controlled corporations (GOCC) and instrumentalities, and the AFAB Board. It is located within the jurisdiction of the three Catholic parishes which are Sto. Niño Alas-asin Parish Church, Our Lady of Fatima Chaplaincy, and Diocesan Shrine and Parish of St. Nicholas of Tolentino Parish, all are under the Diocese of Balanga with the first and third are located outside the freeport's jurisdiction.

Currently there are already 17 approved expansion areas. Their declared economic activities include light and medium industrial, power generation, port services, agri-industrial, commercial, tourism, MICE activities, and BPO/IT in eight different municipalities and the capital city of the province. Of which, 10 are now in development, and seven are already operating. Six of these expansion areas are located in Mariveles, while eleven are scattered in the towns of Bagac, Dinalupihan, Hermosa, Orani, Abucay, Pilar, and Limay, and in the City of Balanga.

== Power ==
The industrial area, and Barangays Maligaya (Pizarro) and Malaya (Quadro) portions of the freeport zone distributes power through the National Transmission Corporation (TransCo) - Utility Management Department (UMD) FAB branch and is independent from the larger province-wide Peninsula Electric Cooperative (PENELCO). Barangays Sisiman, Baseco Country, and portions of Barangay Alasasin also covered by FAB, however, are supplied by PENELCO like the rest of Bataan. Both distribution networks are connected to the transmission grid operated and maintained by National Grid Corporation of the Philippines (NGCP).

A NGCP substation is located on a portion of Barangay Alasasin also under FAB jurisdiction, along a road leading to Mariveles Coal-Fired Power Plant and GNPower Dinginin, the two plants within the freeport.

== Zone Executives ==
Name	Term	Position	President/s
Mariveles Free Trade Zone/Bataan Export Processing Zone/Bataan Economic Zone (FTZ/BEPZ/BEZ) (Philippine Economic Zone Authority (PEZA)) (June 21, 1969–July 2010)
Teodoro Q. Peña	1970 – 1976	Director General	Ferdinand Marcos
Lilia B. de Lima	February 1995 – July 2010	Director General	Fidel V. Ramos; Joseph Estrada; Gloria Macapagal Arroyo; Benigno Aquino III
Freeport Area of Bataan (FAB) (Authority of the Freeport Area of Bataan (AFAB)) (July 2010–present)
Deogracias G.P. Custodio	July 2010 – October 10, 2016	Chairman and Administrator	Benigno Aquino III; Rodrigo Duterte
Emmanuel D. Pineda	October 10, 2016 – May 9, 2023	Chairman (2016–2020); Administrator (2016–2023)	Rodrigo Duterte; Bongbong Marcos
Atty. Pablo M. Gancayco	March 6, 2020 – present	Chairman	Rodrigo Duterte; Bongbong Marcos
Mohammed Hussein Pangandaman	May 9, 2023 – present	Administrator	Bongbong Marcos

== See also ==
- Clark Freeport and Special Economic Zone
- Subic Special Economic and Freeport Zone
