= ArthaLand Century Pacific Tower =

Office building in Taguig, Philippines

- Interactive map of the ArthaLand Century Pacific Tower area

General information
- Status: Completed
- Type: Office
- Location: Bonifacio Global City, Taguig, Metro Manila, Philippines
- Coordinates: 14°33′11″N 121°02′51″E
- Completed: 2018
- Cost: ₱3.5 billion

Height
- Roof: 136 m (446 ft)

Technical details
- Floor count: 32
- Floor area: 62,000 m^{2} (670,000 sq ft)
- Lifts/elevators: 14
- Grounds: 2,232 m^{2} (24,030 sq ft)

Design and construction
- Architecture firm: Skidmore, Owings & Merrill
- Developer: ArthaLand

The ArthaLand Century Pacific Tower is a 32-storey office building in Bonifacio Global City in Taguig, Metro Manila, Philippines. The construction cost of the building owned by Arthaland Corporation is around ₱3.5 billion and was completed in 2018.

== Design and Features ==
The ArthaLand Tower has 21 office floors, 14 elevators, and high-end retail outlets and other retail establishments at the ground floor and podium. It is Philippine Economic Zone Authority accredited and is aiming for LEED (Leadership in Energy and Environment Design Program) Gold and BERDE (Building for Ecologically Responsive Design Excellence) certification.

The office building was designed by Skidmore, Owings & Merrill (SOM) of New York, architect of One World Trade Center in New York City. This building is designed in collaboration with the Filipino architectural firm GF & Partners Architects Co.

The building has 28,000 m^{2} (300,000 sq ft) of net leasable area out of a gross floor area of 34,000 m^{2} (370,000 sq ft).

== Reception ==
The building received the Best Green Development and Highly Commended in the Best Office Architectural Design at the Philippines Property Awards 2016. At the South East Asia Property Awards 2016, the ArthaLand Tower was conferred with the Special Recognition in Sustainable Design.
