= Philippine Economic Zone Authority =

Philippine government agency

- Pangasiwaan sa Sonang Pangkabuhayan ng Pilipinas

- Head office of PEZA along Roxas Boulevard, Pasay City

Agency overview
- Formed: June 21, 1969; 57 years ago
- Preceding Agency: Export Processing Zone Authority
- Jurisdiction: Philippines
- Agency executive: Engr. Joshua M. Bingcang, Director General
- Parent department: Department of Trade and Industry
- Website: www.peza.gov.ph

The Philippine Economic Zone Authority (PEZA; Filipino: Pangasiwaan sa Sonang Pangkabuhayan ng Pilipinas), formerly known as the Foreign Trade Zone Authority (FTZA) and Export Processing Zone Authority (EPZA), is a Philippine government agency attached to the Department of Trade and Industry.

It was created to help promote investments in the export-oriented manufacturing industry into the country by assisting investors in registering and facilitating their business operations and providing tax incentives. PEZA also assists investors who locate in service facilities inside special economic zones in the country (areas are called PEZA Special Economic Zones) which are usually business process outsourcing and knowledge process outsourcing firms. Other activities also eligible for PEZA registration and incentives include establishment and operation within special economic zones for tourism, medical tourism, logistics and warehousing services, economic zone development and operation and facilities providers.

== History and organization ==
On June 21, 1969, Congressman Pablo Roman Sr. authored Republic Act 5490 designating Mariveles, Bataan as the first free trade zone in the Philippines. It also created the Foreign Trade Zone Authority (FTZA).

In early 1972, three congressmen — Roman, Roces, and Sarmiento - sponsored the bill to convert the free trade zone authority into government corporation. This would grant the power of a corporation combined with the coercive strength of the Philippine Government to move the project ahead, especially regarding the relocation of residents. The bill stalled in Congress due to the opposition of many members to the vested interests involved.

On November 20, 1972, the Bataan Export Processing Zone (BEPZ) (later Freeport Area of Bataan (FAB) under Authority of the Freeport Area of Bataan (AFAB) since July 2010) became the first official economic zone in the Philippines through Presidential Decree 66. This changed the agency's name from FTZA to Export Processing Zone Authority (EPZA). The BEPZ was one of the most progressive communities in Luzon during its first decade of operation. The area attracted over one hundred multinational locators.

In 1979, President Ferdinand E. Marcos Sr. signed Proclamation Nos. 1811 and 1825 which established the Mactan Export Processing Zone (MEPZ) in Mactan, Cebu and the Baguio City Export Processing Zone (BCEPZ) in Baguio City. The Cavite Export Processing Zone (CEPZ) was then later created on May 30, 1980, through Proclamation No. 1980 followed by the Pampanga Export Processing Zone (PEPZ) on June 05, 1981 through Proclamation No. 2089, s. 1981.

On February 21, 1995, EPZA became PEZA due to the enactment of Republic Act 7916 which was passed by the House of Representatives and the Senate and approved by former Philippine President Fidel V. Ramos. As provided in the Special Economic Zone Act, the PEZA Board is chaired by the Secretary of the Department of Trade and Industry. Vice-chair is the Director General (Chief Executive Officer) of PEZA. Members of the Board are Undersecretaries representing nine (9) key government Departments, to ensure efficient coordination between PEZA and their respective Departments on matters pertaining to investors' operations inside the Special Economic Zones. PEZA inherited the three public ecozones under EPZA. PEZA acquired Pampanga Economic Zone in 2003.

Old logo of PEZA

The Bataan Economic Zone (BEZ) was separated from PEZA when it turned over the zone's operations and management to another government agency Authority of the Freeport Area of Bataan (AFAB) in July 2010 one month after the end of administration of President Gloria Macapagal Arroyo and her successor Benigno Aquino III became President of the Philippines which changed the zone's name to Freeport Area of Bataan (FAB) and abolished the BEPZ/BEZ names, marking the effectivity of Republic Act (RA) 9728 signed on October 23, 2009, by Arroyo. This change was reflected when AFAB removed the PEZA and BEZ name and logo on the zone's administration building and a welcome sign along Roman Superhighway which made the red part of the BEPZ/BEZ/PEZA logo became all blue on late August 2010 as one of the projects of AFAB made during its first few months of operation and management over the zone and then the said logo was next to be removed by placing a cement on a part of the building where the logo is in 2012. Despite these, there are still traces and references of them still left that were not yet removed, such as on some signages found on Mariveles Zigzag Road and on a newer welcome sign located after the zone's another sign with a guard house along the said highway. The BEZ sticker is still effective until AFAB started to issue FAB stickers in March 2011 which succeeded the former. FAB initially had 39 enterprises and 12,777 workers by the time of turnover of the zone's operations and management from PEZA to AFAB which inherited from its predecessor BEZ.

== Incentives ==
PEZA offers both fiscal and non-fiscal incentives as well as ready-to-occupy business locations in world-class economic zones and IT parks or buildings. Fiscal incentives include: income tax holiday for a certain number of years, which translates to 100% exemption from corporate income tax; tax and duty-free importation of raw materials, capital equipment, machineries and spare parts; exemption from wharfage dues and export tax, impost or fees; VAT zero-rating of local purchases subject to compliance with BIR and PEZA requirements; exemption from payment of any and all local government imposts, fees, licenses or taxes; and exemption from expanded withholding tax. Non-fiscal incentives, on the other hand, include simplified import-export procedures, extended visa facilitation assistance to foreign nationals and spouses and dependents; special visa multiple entry privileges; and more.

== Firms ==
As of February 2019, PEZA has over 396 fully operating economic zones that are spread across the country. Aside from central business districts in Bonifacio Global City, Makati, Ortigas and Quezon City, there are also economic zones in other next-wave cities such as Batangas, Cebu, Baguio, Subic, Iloilo, Dumaguete, Pampanga and more. Currently, PEZA-accredited buildings and office spaces are mostly in Makati with over 35 operating economic zones including Glorietta 1 and 2 BPO, PBCom Tower, and the Zuellig Building. In Fort Bonifacio or Bonifacio Global City, there are 17 operating economic zones, including Bonifacio Technology Center, Sun Life Centre, Picadilly Star, World Plaza and EcoTower. In Quezon City, there are 18 operating economic zones including ABS-CBN Corporation's ELJ Communications Center in Diliman. In Pampanga, there is one economic zone, Alviera Industrial Park.

== Investments ==
In the first quarter of 2025, the Philippine Economic Zone Authority (PEZA) reported investment approvals totaling ₱58.95 billion, a 249 percent increase from the same period in 2024, reflecting renewed investor confidence and growing interest in export and business process outsourcing zones.

== List of Agency Executives of FTZA/EPZA/PEZA ==
1. Teodoro Q. Peña - 1970 to 1978
2. Lilia B. de Lima - February 1995 to June 2016
3. Justo Porfirio Ll. Yusingco (Officer-In-Charge) - July to October 2016
4. BGen. Charito B. Plaza, MNSA PhD. - October 2016 to June 2022
5. Tereso O. Panga (Officer-In-Charge) - July 2022 to March 2023
6. Tereso O. Panga - March 2023 to present

== See also ==
- List of special economic zones in the Philippines
