= Hermosa, Bataan =

Municipality in Bataan, Philippines

Hermosa
- Municipality
- Municipality of Hermosa
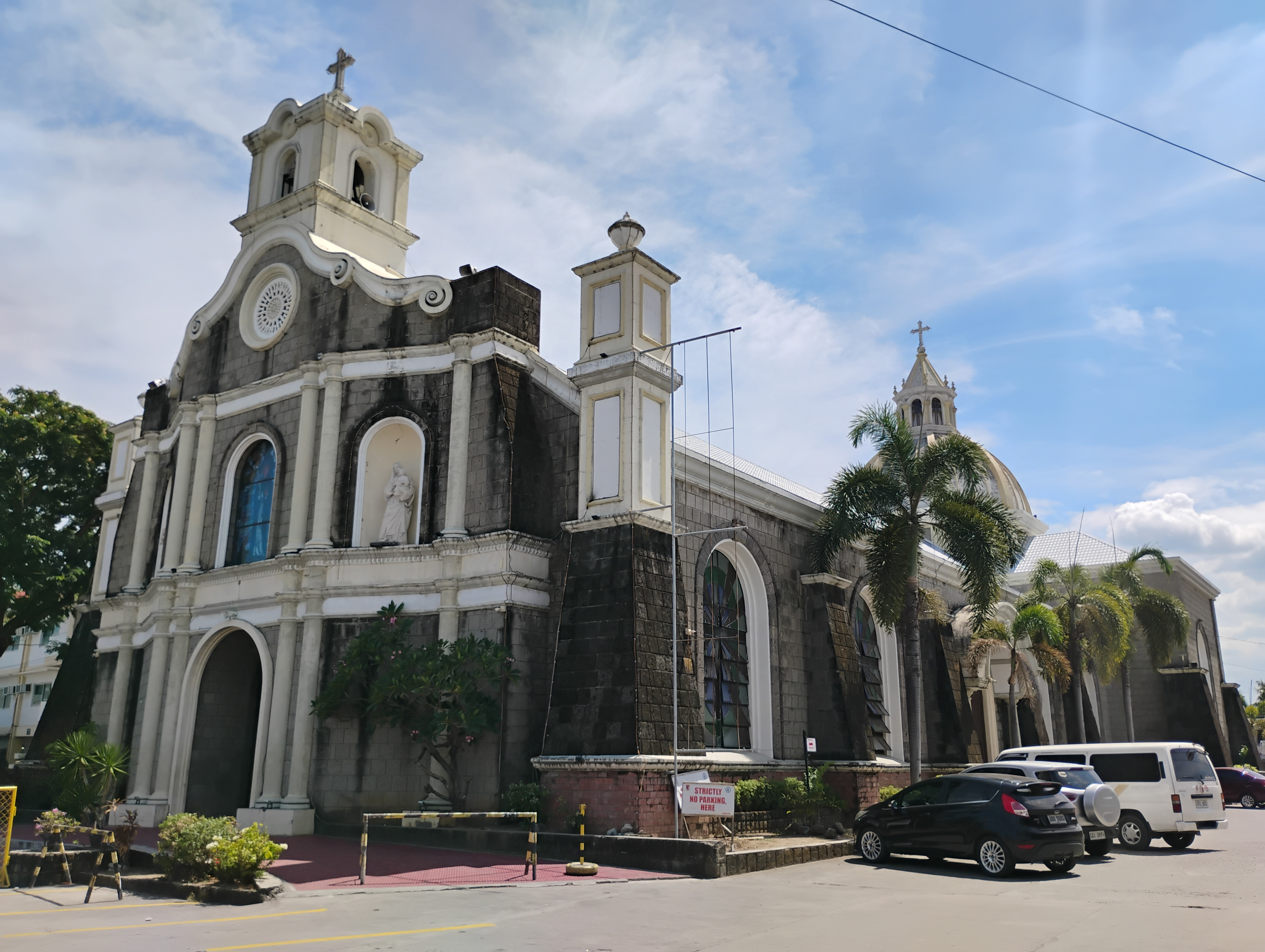
- Saint Peter of Verona Parish Church

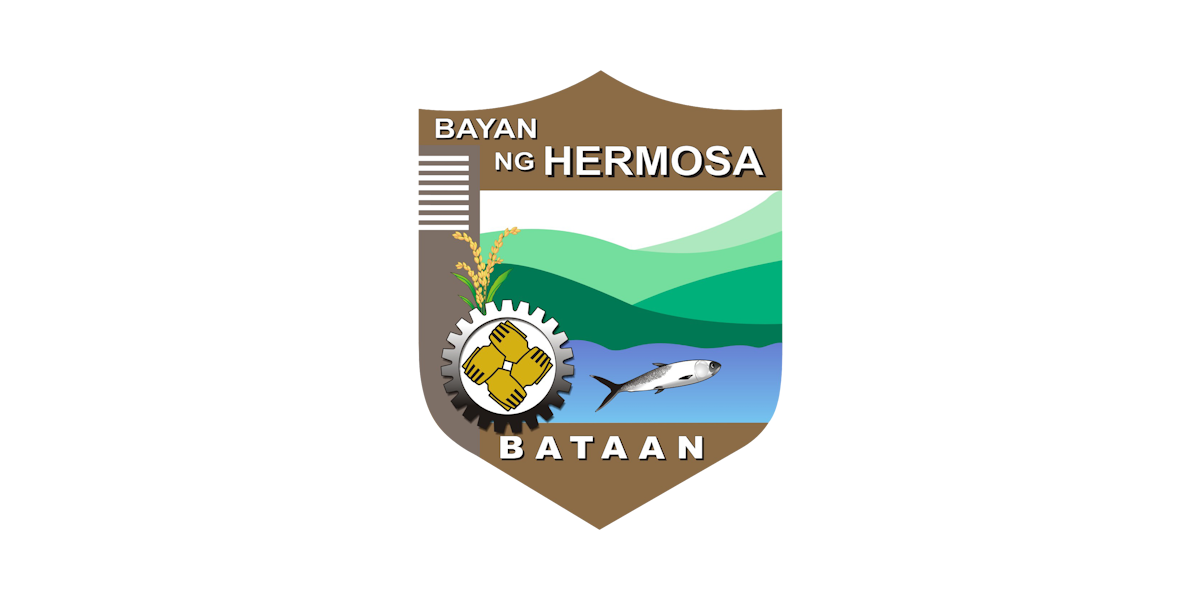
- Flag Seal

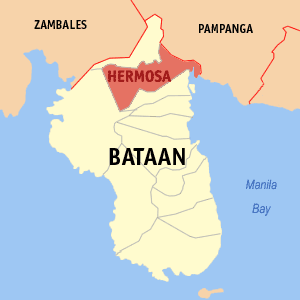
- Map of Bataan, Pampanga with Hermosa highlighted
- Interactive map of Hermosa
- Location within the Philippines
- Coordinates: 14°50′N 120°30′E
- Country: Philippines
- Region: Bataan, Pampanga
- Province: Bataan, Pampanga
- District: 1st district
- Founded: 1852
- Barangays: 23 (see Barangays)

Government
  - Type: Sangguniang Bayan
  - Mayor: Atty. Anne Lorraine C. Adorable-Inton
  - Vice Mayor: Patrick S. Rellosa
  - Representative: Antonino B. Roman III
  - Municipal Council: Members: Patrick S. Rellosa; Christopher D. Vitug; Jenna Marie S. Basi; Luzviminda J. Samaniego; Floyd J. Tungol; Angelito N. Narciso; Wilson M. Valencia; Regalado D. Santos
  - Electorate: 52,021 voters (2025)

Area
  - Total: 157.00 km^{2} (60.62 sq mi)
- Elevation: 21 m (69 ft)
- Highest elevation: 161 m (528 ft)
- Lowest elevation: −3 m (−9.8 ft)

Population (2024 census)
  - Total: 80,557
  - Density: 513.10/km^{2} (1,328.9/sq mi)
  - Households: 18,494

Economy
  - Income class: 1st municipal income class
  - Poverty incidence: 11.74% (2023)
  - Revenue: ₱ 465.4 million (2024)
  - Assets: ₱ 1,316 million (2024)
  - Expenditure: ₱ 398.6 million (2024)
  - Liabilities: ₱ 245.2 million (2024)

Service provider
  - Electricity: Peninsula Electric Cooperative (PENELCO)
- Time zone: UTC+8 (PST)
- ZIP code: 2111, 2222 (Subic Special Economic and Freeport Zone)
- PSGC: 0300805000
- IDD : area code: +63 (0)47
- Native languages: Kapampangan; Mariveleño; Tagalog
- Website: www.hermosa.gov.ph

Hermosa, officially the Municipality of Hermosa (Tagalog: Bayan ng Hermosa, Kapampangan: Balen ning Hermosa; Ilocano: Ili ti Hermosa), is a municipality in the province of Bataan, Philippines. According to the 2024 census, it has a population of 80,557 people.

== History ==
Historically, the town was established in 1756 by Dominican priests. At that time, it was known as Llana Hermosa and composed of Mabuco and Mabuyan. It was then still part of Pampanga, like the rest of Bataan. It became an independent missionary center in 1756 with Saint Peter of Verona as its patron saint. The 1818 Spanish census showed there to be 716 native families and 1 large Spanish-Filipino clan.

The town of Hermosa was very peaceful and progressive before World War II. When the war broke out, their quiet routine was disturbed. During the Bataan Death March, civilians of Hermosa risked the ire of the Japanese by secretly passing food to Filipino and American soldiers.

== Geography ==
Hermosa is located directly south of Dinalupihan and south-southwest of San Fernando, Pampanga (the regional city center). Hermosa borders the province of the Pampanga to the northeast, with Manila Bay to the east.

Hermosa is home to the Roosevelt Protected Landscape and Subic Bay Freeport Zone (SBFZ; along with Morong also in the province of Bataan, and Olongapo and Subic in Zambales), and is accessible via the Bataan Provincial Expressway, off Exit 10 and Jose Abad Santos Avenue. It is 19 kilometres (12 mi) from Balanga and 105 kilometres (65 mi) from Manila.

According to the Philippine Statistics Authority, the municipality has a land area of 157.00 square kilometres (60.62 sq mi) constituting 11.43% of the 1,372.98-square-kilometre- (530.11 sq mi) total area of Bataan.

=== Climate ===
Climate data for Hermosa, Bataan
Month	Jan	Feb	Mar	Apr	May	Jun	Jul	Aug	Sep	Oct	Nov	Dec	Year
Mean daily maximum °C (°F)	31 (88)	32 (90)	34 (93)	35 (95)	33 (91)	31 (88)	29 (84)	29 (84)	29 (84)	29 (84)	30 (86)	31 (88)	31 (88)
Mean daily minimum °C (°F)	19 (66)	19 (66)	20 (68)	23 (73)	25 (77)	25 (77)	24 (75)	25 (77)	25 (77)	24 (75)	23 (73)	20 (68)	23 (73)
Average precipitation mm (inches)	7 (0.3)	8 (0.3)	14 (0.6)	26 (1.0)	127 (5.0)	210 (8.3)	263 (10.4)	272 (10.7)	218 (8.6)	114 (4.5)	46 (1.8)	21 (0.8)	1,326 (52.3)
Average rainy days	4.0	4.0	6.9	11.2	21.0	24.5	27.4	26.9	25.9	21.9	13.4	6.3	193.4
Source: Meteoblue

=== Barangays ===
Hermosa is politically subdivided into 23 barangays. Each barangay consists of puroks and some have sitios.

PSGC	Barangay	Population			±% p.a.	
		2024		2010		
030805001	A. Rivera (Poblacion)	2.1%	1,675	1,663	▴	0.05%
030805002	Almacen	2.7%	2,175	1,939	▴	0.80%
030805003	Bacong	3.5%	2,828	2,547	▴	0.73%
030805004	Balsic	8.2%	6,594	5,704	▴	1.01%
030805005	Bamban	3.0%	2,379	2,157	▴	0.68%
030805006	Burgos‑Soliman (Poblacion)	0.7%	556	493	▴	0.84%
030805007	Cataning (Poblacion)	3.7%	3,018	2,656	▴	0.89%
030805008	Culis	10.7%	8,610	7,216	▴	1.23%
030805009	Daungan (Poblacion)	1.2%	962	905	▴	0.43%
030805024	Judge Roman Cruz Sr. (Mandama)	4.7%	3,816	3,072	▴	1.52%
030805010	Mabiga	3.6%	2,902	2,144	▴	2.13%
030805011	Mabuco	4.0%	3,238	2,943	▴	0.67%
030805012	Maite	2.1%	1,706	1,548	▴	0.68%
030805013	Mambog ‑ Mandama	3.6%	2,922	2,585	▴	0.85%
030805014	Palihan	7.6%	6,129	5,621	▴	0.60%
030805015	Pandatung	2.5%	2,048	1,713	▴	1.25%
030805016	Pulo	0.7%	579	365	▴	3.26%
030805017	Saba	2.3%	1,875	1,737	▴	0.53%
030805025	Sacrifice Valley	1.5%	1,248	1,183	▴	0.37%
030805019	San Pedro (Poblacion)	2.9%	2,318	1,950	▴	1.21%
030805020	Santo Cristo (Poblacion)	1.1%	896	897	▾	−0.01%
030805021	Sumalo	2.4%	1,923	1,529	▴	1.61%
030805023	Tipo	6.8%	5,465	4,430	▴	1.47%
	Total		80,557	56,997	▴	2.43%

== Demographics ==
Population census of Hermosa

Year	Pop.	±% p.a.
1903	1,854	—
1918	3,307	+3.93%
1939	6,819	+3.51%
1948	8,437	+2.39%
1960	12,550	+3.36%
1970	19,501	+4.50%

Year	Pop.	±% p.a.
1975	23,246	+3.59%
1980	25,672	+2.00%
1990	34,633	+3.04%
1995	38,764	+2.13%
2000	46,254	+3.86%
2007	52,484	+1.76%

Year	Pop.	±% p.a.
2010	56,997	+3.05%
2015	65,862	+2.79%
2020	77,443	+3.47%
2024	80,557	+0.95%

Source: Philippine Statistics Authority

In the 2024 census, Hermosa had a population of 80,557 people. The population density was 510 inhabitants per square kilometre (1,300/sq mi).

== Economy ==
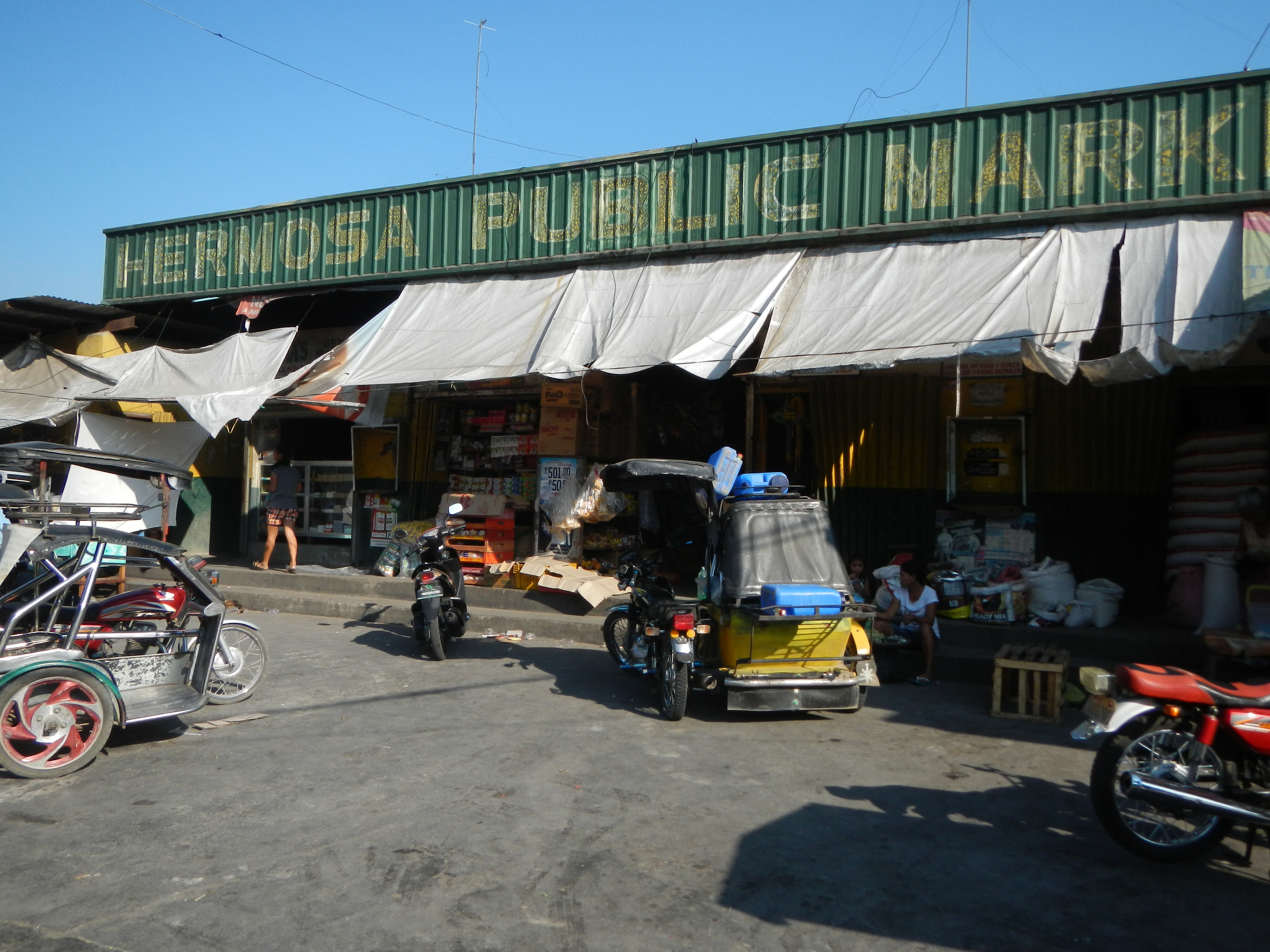
Public market

Poverty incidence of Hermosa (%)

Source: Philippine Statistics Authority

Existing industries in Hermosa are garments, handpainted jars, balut and salted egg making. Today, fruit processing particularly of mangoes and bananas, handicrafts, and stuffed toys are the major produce of this town. Probably less known, but existing for a long time is the aquaculture industry, traditionally for bangus, tilapia and crabs, but more recently for prawns, which was found more lucrative.

Hermosa Rural Bank serves the banking needs of the municipality. Major bus lines and mini-bus coming from Manila, San Fernando and Olongapo pass through the town of Hermosa while the most common type of transport within the municipality are jeepneys and tricycles. The newly established Hermosa Public Market in barangay Palihan has also the terminal of vehicles going to Clark and Mabalacat in Pampanga via SCTEX. The town has a total of 1 bank, 21 schools, 15 medical clinics/health centers, and 2 recreational facilities.

=== Hermosa Special Economic Zone ===
The Zone is adapted for building light to medium industries, recreational and housing facilities for industry and residents inside the zone investments in fruit processing utilizing the abundant supply of mangoes and banana in the province. The Subic Hermosa Cybercity is a 93-hectare Special Economic Zone which will host locator Businesses dealing in Information Technology (IT), manufacture of electronic products, IT research and development, and multi-media industries.

== Government ==
=== Local government ===
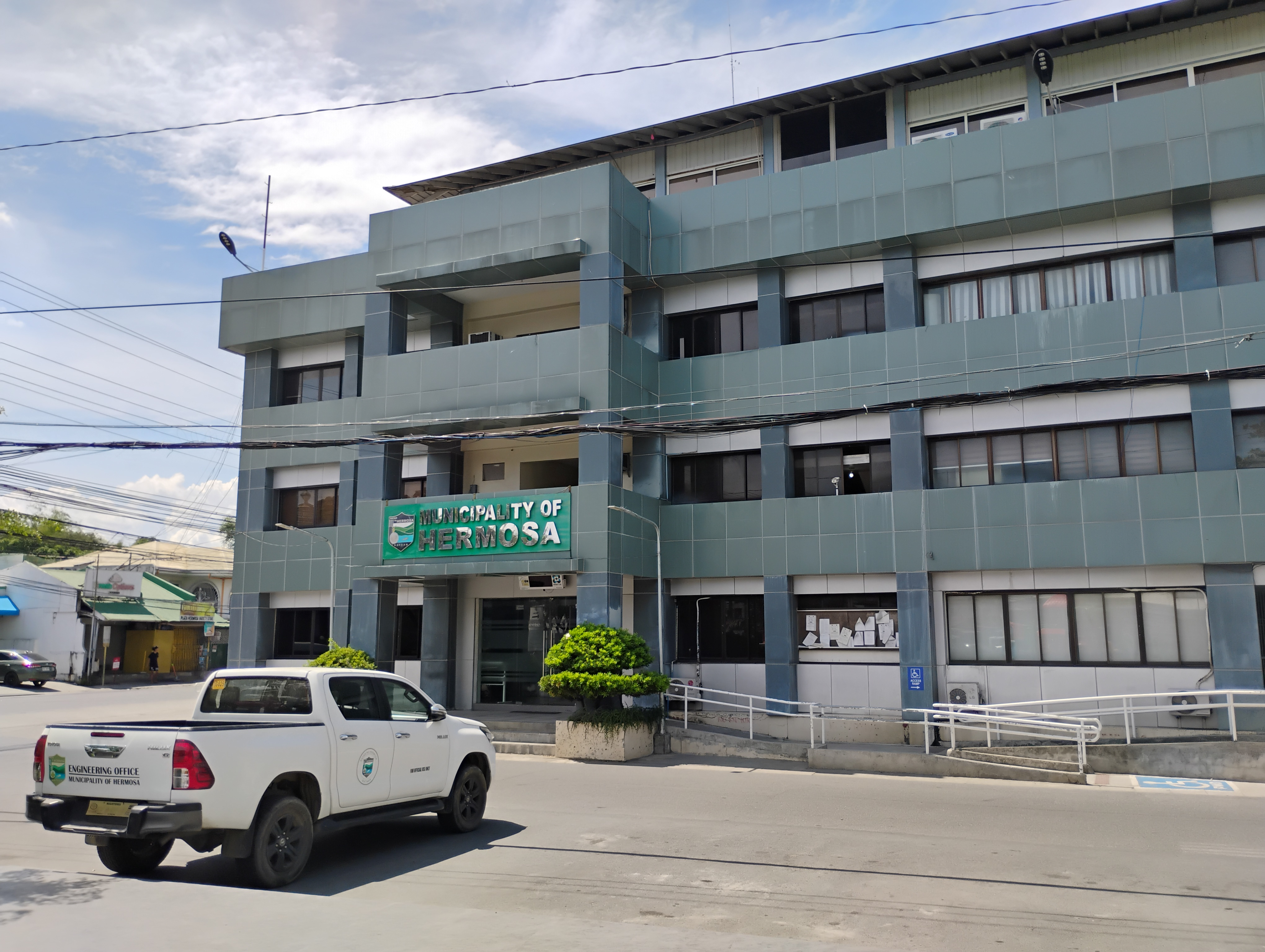
Hermosa Municipal Hall

Pursuant to the Local government in the Philippines", the political seat of the municipal government is located at the Municipal Hall. The legislative and executive departments perform their functions in the Sangguniang Bayan (Session Hall) and Municipal Trial Court, respectively, and are located in the Town Hall.

=== Elected officials ===
Members of the Hermosa Municipal Council (2022–2025)
Position	Name of official
District Representative (1st Legislative District, Bataan)	Geraldine B. Roman
Municipal Mayor	Antonio Joseph Rivera Inton
Municipal Vice Mayor	Eigie Malana
Municipal Councilors	Patrick S. Rellosa
Municipal Councilors	Christopher D. Vitug
Municipal Councilors	Jenna Marie S. Basi
Municipal Councilors	Luzviminda J. Samaniego
Municipal Councilors	Floyd J. Tungol
Municipal Councilors	Angelito N. Narciso
Municipal Councilors	Wilson M. Valencia
Municipal Councilors	Gelly Grace Santos

== Infrastructure ==
=== Telecommunications ===
Digitel is the major provider of telecommunication services in the municipality.

Cable TV is provided by the Hermosa Cable, Destiny and Malasimbu. Internet connection is also provided by Digitel, Smart (SmartBro) and Converge ICT.

=== Electricity ===
Hermosa is 100% electrified and is being served by the Peninsula Electric Company (PENELCO).

Two substations of the National Grid Corporation of the Philippines (NGCP) are located along Jose Abad Santos Avenue just before entering Pampanga which are Hermosa and Balsik EHV substations. It also provides power to the municipality other than Penelco through its transmission lines.

=== Water service ===
Major source of water for domestic use is ground water. Existing water systems are artesian and open wells, pumps and pipeline with tanks. Two barangays are being served by a common facility through the Local Water Utilities Administration (LWUA). In addition, a new facility was installed in barangay Mabuco, which now served the whole poblacion.

== Education ==
The Hermosa Schools District Office governs all educational institutions within the municipality. It oversees the management and operations of all private and public, from primary to secondary schools.

=== Elementary schools ===
- Almacen Elementary School
- Bacong Elementary School
- Balsik Elementary School
- Bamban Elementary School
- Bethany Methodist Learning Center
- Culis Elementary School
- Divine Miracle Christian Academy
- Hermosa Elementary School
- Mabiga Elementary School
- Maite Elementary School
- Mambog Elementary School
- Pandatung Elementary School
- Parapal Elementary School
- Pastolan Elementary School
- Pulo Elementary School
- Saba Elementary School
- Tipo Elementary School

=== Secondary schools ===
- Balsik National High School
- Hermosa National High School
- Hermosa National High School-Annex
- Jesus Saves Integrated School Foundation
- St. Peter of Verona Academy, Inc.
