= Mariveles Coal-Fired Power Plant =

Coal power plant in Mariveles, Philippines

GNPower Mariveles Energy Center Ltd. Co.
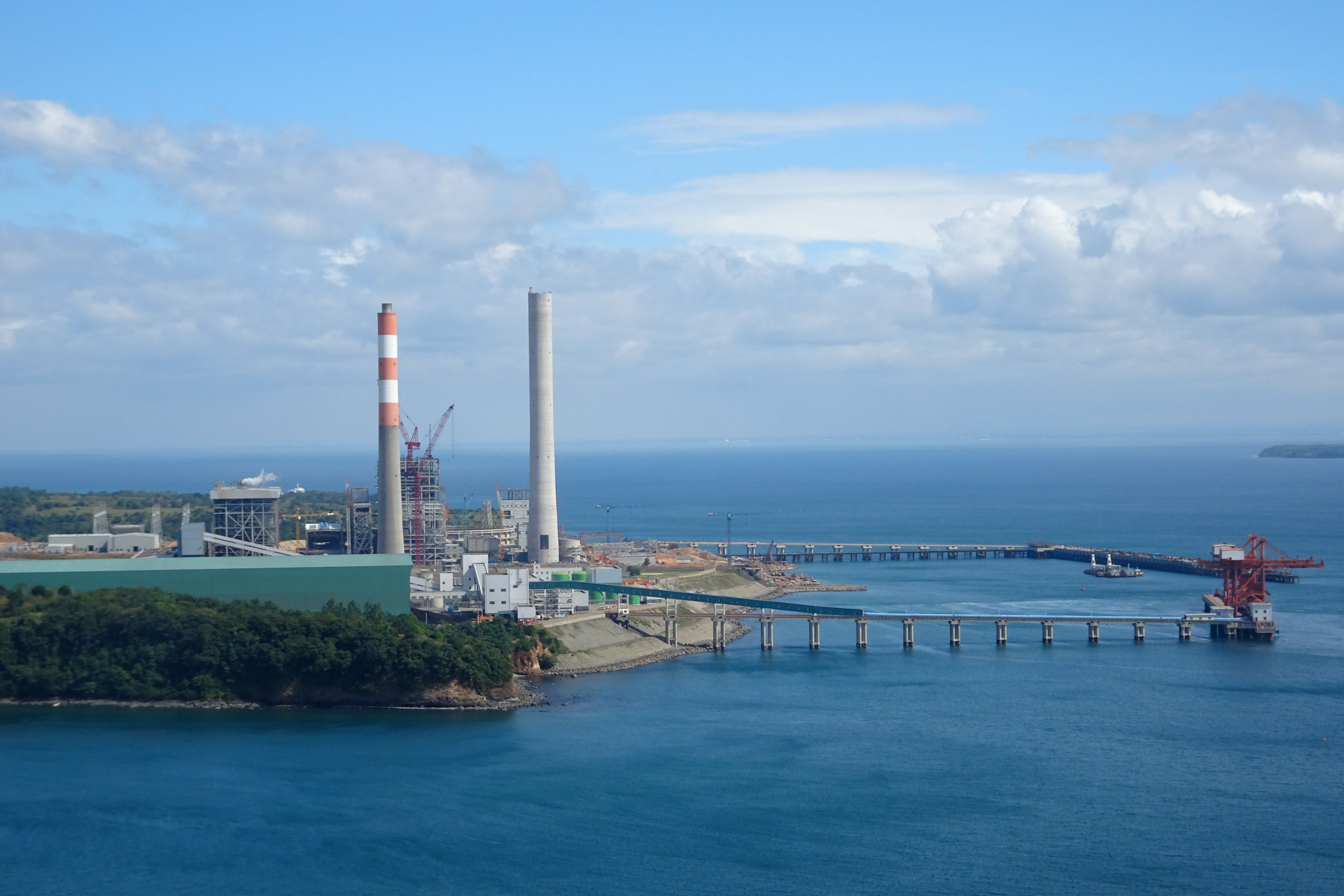
- Country: Philippines
- Location: Barangay Alasasin, Freeport Area of Bataan, Mariveles, Bataan
- Coordinates: 14°25′29″N 120°32′12″E
- Status: Operational
- Construction began: January 2010
- Commission date: January 21, 2013
- Owner: GNPower Mariveles Coal Plant Ltd Co.

Thermal power station
- Primary fuel: Coal

Power generation
- Nameplate capacity: 650 MW

External links
- Website: www.gnpower.com.ph
- Commons: Related media on Commons

GNPower Mariveles Energy Center Ltd. Co. (formerly "GNPower Mariveles Coal Plant Ltd. Co.") is a subcritical coal-fired power plant located in Freeport Area of Bataan (FAB)-covered portion of Barangay Alasasin in Mariveles, Bataan. The 600-MW facility was connected to the Luzon power grid on January 21, 2013. The facility was a joint project of GNPower Mariveles Energy Center Ltd. Co. and AC Energy.

Two additional units are under construction, both with 600-MW capacity. It was scheduled in early 2016 that the construction of the first unit which would cost P1 billion would commence.

Aboitiz Power Corporation (AP), through their wholly owned subsidiary Therma Power, Inc. acquired 66.1 percent ownership interest. It was completed on December 27, 2016.
