= Camaya Coast =

Residential development in Bataan province, Philippines

Coordinates: 14.4536°N 120.4212°E

The Camaya Coast (/kəˈmɑːjə/ kə-MAH-yə) is a residential development in the municipality of Mariveles in Bataan province, Philippines. The beach resort is located in Sitio Wain, Barangay Biaan, Mariveles, Bataan, with its entrance is located along Bagac-Mariveles Road. The 450-hectare (1,100-acre) community includes commercial and residential developments, which includes six subdivisions. The beach resort has a coastal length of around 3.2 kilometres (2.0 mi) total, which includes two coves. It is being promoted by the developer as the Little Boracay of Bataan. There are also several waterfalls and a river running through the area. The resort is owned and being developed by Earth and Shore Leisure Communities, led by President and CEO Manuel Carlos Ilagan Jr. The name of the resort area is a reflection of the original name of the town of Mariveles, which used to be called Camaya.

== Development ==
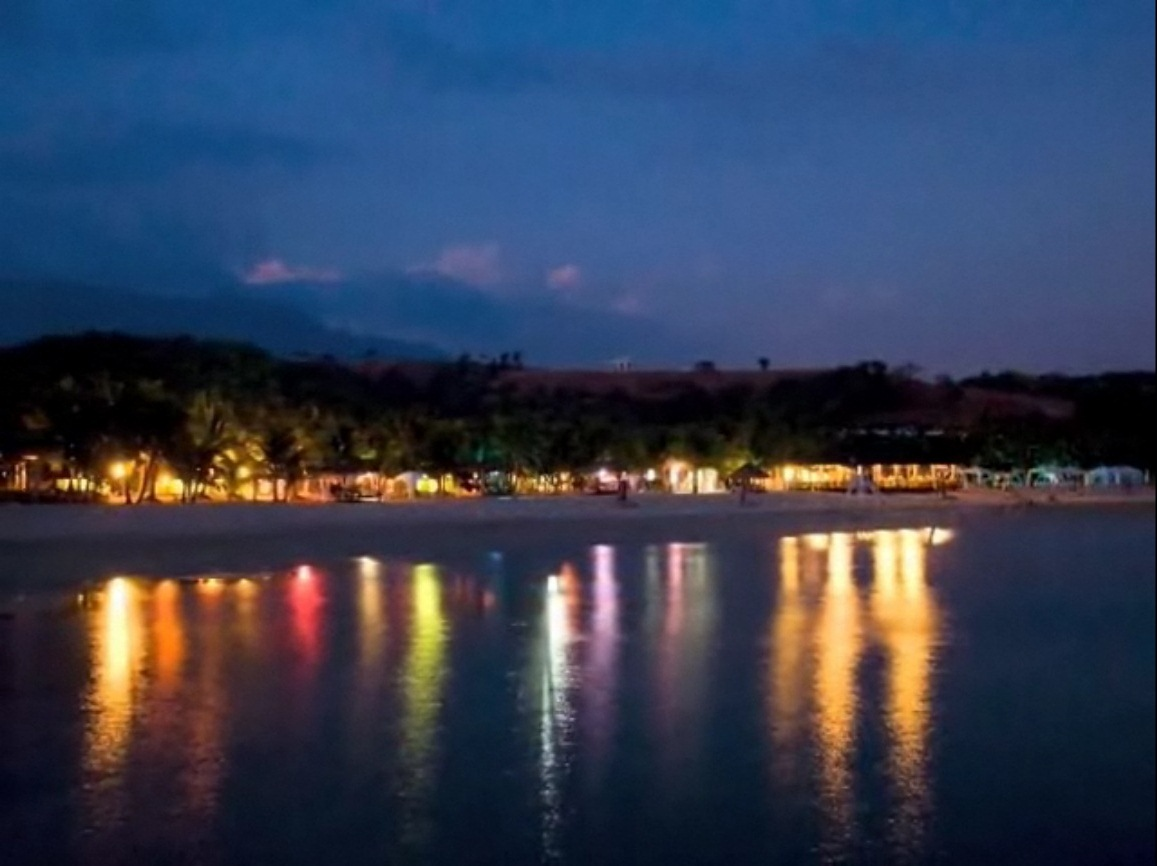
Camaya Coast area seen from a boat in the early evening.

The development is being promoted as a green or environmentally friendly community, which includes a sewage treatment plant and a silt trap, both of which are meant to keep the area clean and safe while maintaining the balance of natural elements. In addition, the buildings in the development are constructed with a material called Plasform Panel, made by Plastech Industrial Systems from Kuala Lumpur. The material is claimed to be lightweight and easy to handle and eliminates the use of timber and plywood, and the cost for plastering.

Focused on promoting eco-tourism, thirty percent of the area is kept as natural forest reserves with an array of fruit trees including star apples, mangoes, and cashew nuts and some orchids. The forest is also a habitat for wild goats, wild boars and exotic birds.

== Beach resort ==
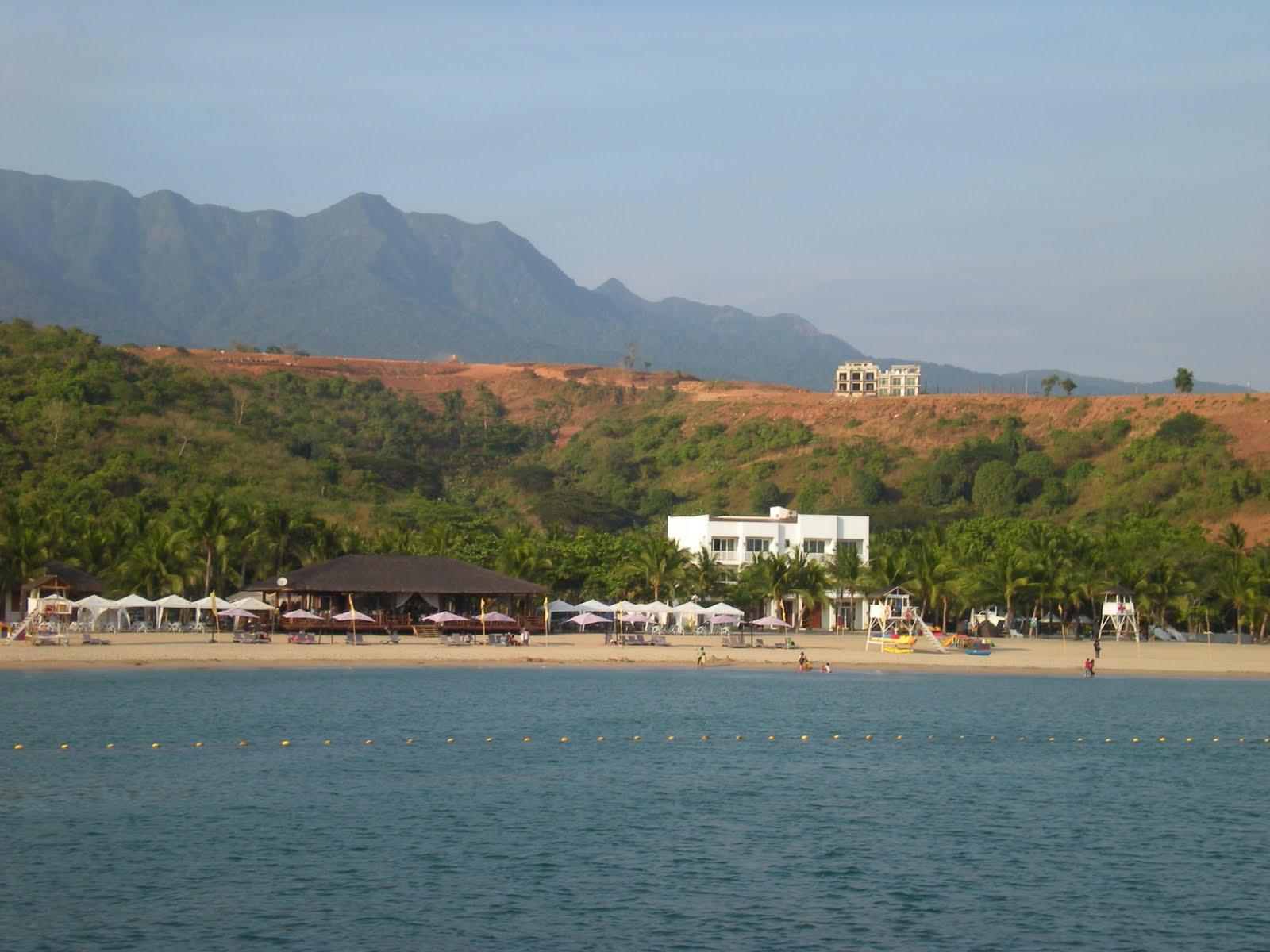
Hotel Camaya, clearly visible to arriving guests as a large white building very near the beach.

The area currently holds a restaurant, an infinity swimming pool, an event hall, and a boutique hotel. The hotel was built with the exterior resembling the architecture of Miami, Florida, while the interior has an Asian contemporary look.

Representative Albert S. Garcia from the 2nd District of Bataan stated that the Camaya Coast had huge tourist potential, as it was already bringing significant tourism to Bataan in general, and he was optimistic about its future. The mayor of Mariveles, Jesse I. Concepcion, said that the Camaya Coast is far more accessible than other attractions in the region, as it is only two hours by land from Metro Manila, and only an hour by ferry boat from Roxas Boulevard. The chairman of the Authority of the Freeport Area of Bataan (AFAB), Deogracias G.P. Custodio, commented that Camaya Coast as an integral part of the work-life balance lifestyle at the FAB and favors the contrast the resort gives to the industrial and business sectors that make up the FAB region.

== See also ==
- Camaya Falls
- Bataan Risers
