= Camaya Falls =

Coordinates: 14.46481°N 120.4210°E

- Wain Falls
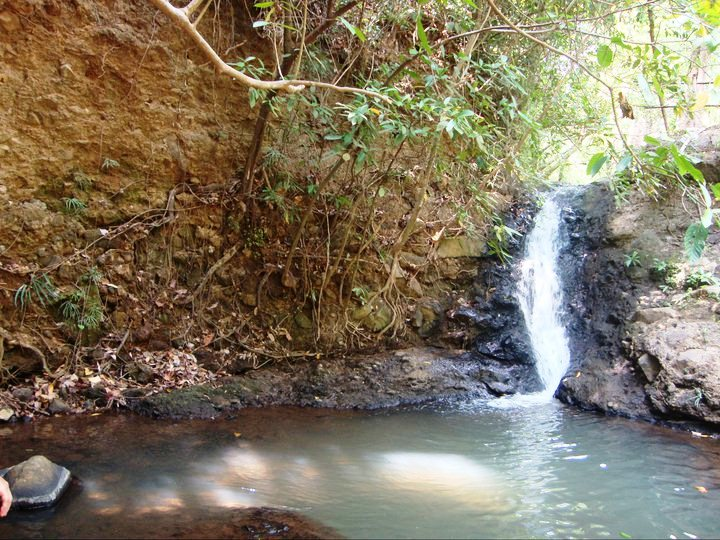
- The smallest of the three waterfalls in Camaya Coast, Mariveles, Bataan, Philippines
- Interactive map of Camaya Falls
- Location: Mariveles, Bataan, Luzon, Philippines
- Type: Punchbowl; Horsetail
- Total height: 3.152 m (10.3 ft)
- Number of drops: 2
- Longest drop: 3.152 m (10.3 ft)
- Average width: 2.3 feet (0.70 m)
- Average flow rate: 1.30 m³ (45.91 ft³) per second

Camaya Falls is a collection of three waterfalls located in Camaya Coast in the city of Mariveles, in the southwestern part of the Bataan peninsula and province, Philippines. The smallest, a 10.3-foot (3.1 m) waterfall, is the most accessible and one of the natural attractions in Camaya Coast, a private residential community and beach resort area currently under development.

== Flora and fauna ==
The forest of Mount Mariveles where the waterfalls are located contains many dipterocarps, orchids, and vines and other plant species including tsaang gubat. Various species of fungi growing in tree trunks have been documented.

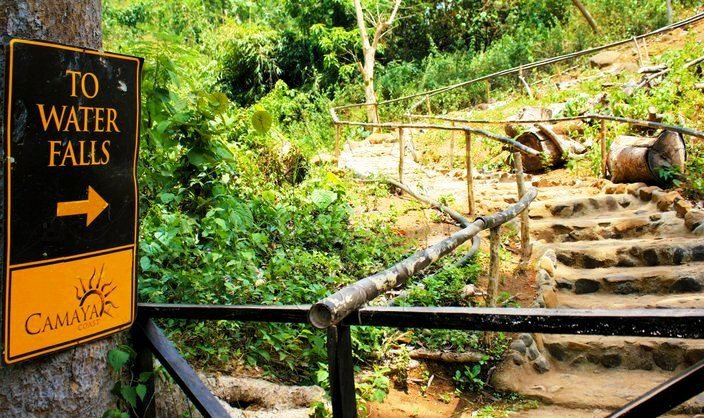
The sign heading to the forest where Camaya waterfalls is located

There are a number of interesting animals that inhabit the slopes of Mount Mariveles where the three waterfalls are located. The most notable include: the Japanese sparrowhawk, the endangered Philippine eagle (Pithecophaga jefferyi) commonly known as the “monkey-eating eagle", the Philippine eagle owl, the rufous hornbill (Buceros hydrocorax) locally known as kalaw, the endangered giant golden-crowned flying fox (Acerodon jubatus), which can only be found in the Philippines. Philippine deer (erroneously reported by some as wild goats) and crab-eating macaques were also recently spotted in the area.
