= EcoTower =

Building in Taguig, Philippines

- Interactive map of the EcoTower area

General information
- Location: 32nd Street corner 9th Avenue, Bonifacio Global City, Taguig, Philippines
- Coordinates: 14°33′12″N 121°03′09″E
- Opening: 2013

Technical details
- Floor count: 32
- Floor area: 1,250 square meters (13,500 sq ft)

Design and construction
- Architects: Jose Siao Ling & Associates
- Developer: Superprime Holdings, Inc

EcoTower is a 32-story edifice with 25 office floors located in Bonifacio Global City, Metro Manila, Philippines. Classified as a Grade A building, EcoTower's construction began in 2011 and was completed in January 2013. The skyscraper has a total commercial and office space area of 29,000 square meters with a typical floor plate of 1,250 square meters. It was designed by Jose Siao Ling & Associates and built by Monolith Construction. In the first two months of 2013, there is highest demand for office space in EcoTower, particularly from BPO firms as it is the only new building with accreditation from the Philippine Export Zone Authority (PEZA) at the time.

== Design and features ==
EcoTower has a modern architectural style and sustainable design. It has 90% floor efficiency and variable refrigerant flow air-conditioning systems.

The building is primarily built to provide smart office space for corporate tenants and business process outsourcing (BPO) firms.

== Location ==
EcoTower is located along major thoroughfare 32nd Street and is a short walk to transport hubs in Bonifacio Global City. It is within the vicinity of entertainment and dining hubs such as Bonifacio High Street and several residential condos.

== Known tenants ==
- 10/F: Warner Music Philippines
- 11/F: Mindshare Philippines
- 17/F: TECHNO GLOBAL TEAM
