= Roman Superhighway =

Road in Bataan, Philippines

Roman Superhighway
- Bataan Provincial Expressway; Bataan Provincial Highway
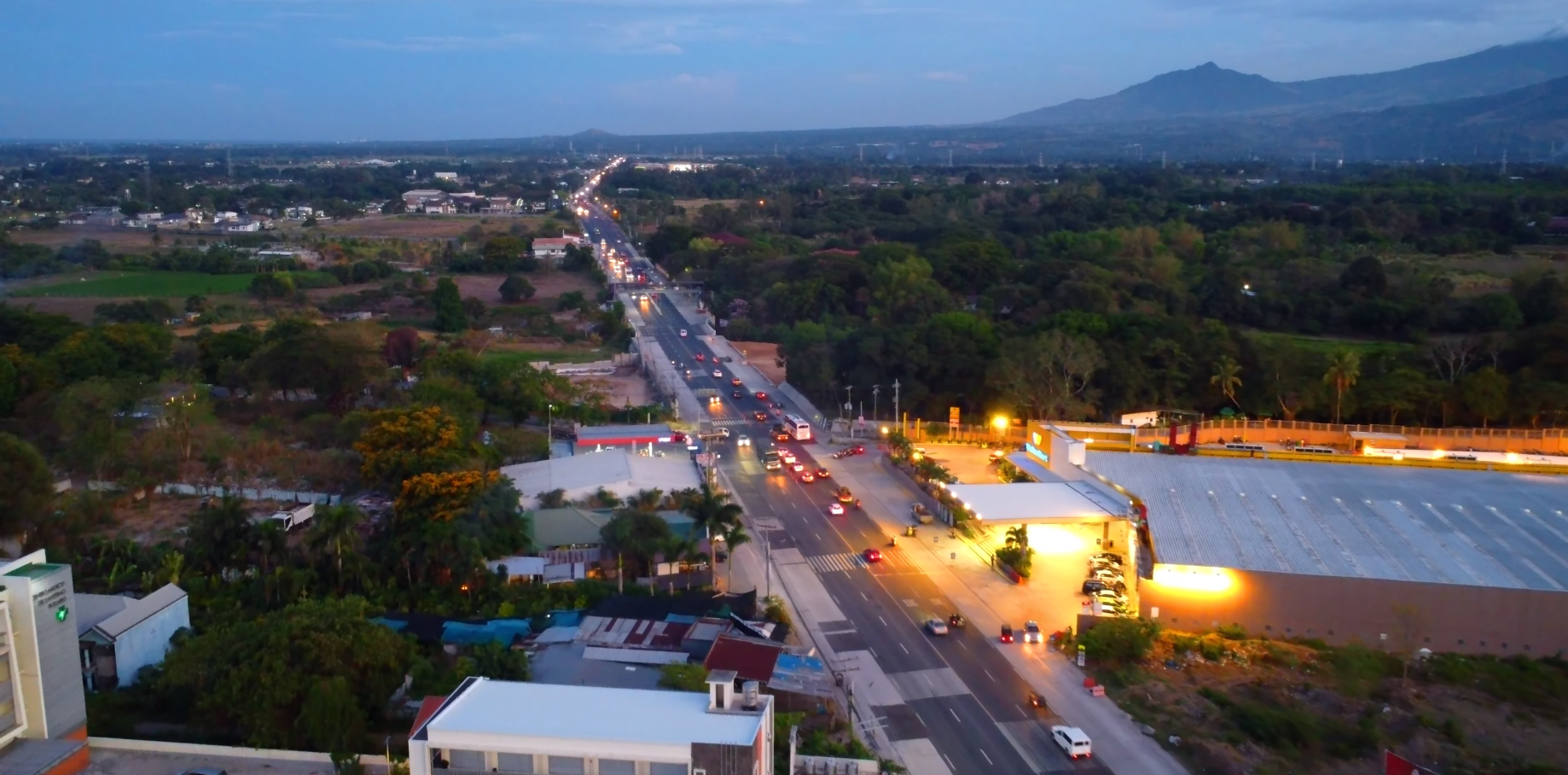
- Roman Superhighway in Balanga

Route information
- Maintained by Department of Public Works and Highways; Bataan 1st–3rd District Engineering Office
- Length: 68 km (42 mi)
- Existed: 1977–present
- Component highways: N301

Major junctions
- North end: N3 (Jose Abad Santos Avenue) in Dinalupihan
- E4 (SCTEX Dinalupihan Exit) in Hermosa; N302 (Gov. Joaquin J. Linao National Road) in Pilar; N303 (Bataan National Road) in Orion and Limay
- South end: N301 (Mariveles–Talaga Bay Road) / Mariveles–Bagac Road in Mariveles

Location
- Country: Philippines
- Provinces: Bataan
- Major cities: Balanga
- Towns: Dinalupihan, Hermosa, Orani, Samal, Abucay, Pilar, Orion, Limay, Mariveles

Highway system
- Roads in the Philippines; Highways; Expressways; List

The Roman Superhighway, Roman Highway, or Bataan Provincial Highway, formerly known as the Bataan Provincial Expressway, is a 68-kilometer (42 mi), two- to four-lane major highway that connects the municipality of Dinalupihan to the municipality of Mariveles in Bataan, Philippines. The entire road forms part of National Route 301 (N301) of the Philippine highway network.

== Etymology ==
Roman Superhighway is named after Pablo Roman Sr., a former representative of Bataan who is the acknowledged father of the export processing zone in Mariveles known as the Bataan Export Processing Zone/Bataan Economic Zone (BEPZ/BEZ; now known as Freeport Area of Bataan (FAB) since July 2010).

== History ==
Construction of the Roman Superhighway began on April 7, 1973 during the Martial Law period and completed on July 16, 1977. The project was implemented by President Ferdinand Marcos. It was originally intended to be an expressway to serve BEPZ in Mariveles, but it later became an at-grade highway when local residents built houses and businesses along it.

The fully concrete road with asphalt shoulders has an effective width of 30 meters (98 ft), although some portions measured up to 60 meters (200 ft) maximum. Phase 1 of the total project covered from Dinalupihan to Alauli Junction in Pilar and it measured 24 kilometers (15 mi) long and complemented with 22 steel-concrete bridges. Phase 2 is measured 44 kilometers (27 mi) and has 12 bridges. The project also involved alignments that would replace the old existing two-lane roads as part of the Old National Road which are from Palihan to Culis, Hermosa, Daan Pare to Puting Buhangin, Orion, and Alangan, Limay to Mariveles segments, widening those sections to four lanes. A short Dinalupihan section from Layac Junction to Layac Bridge No. 3, however, is the only one that retain the original older road and bridge appearance having two lanes that was later integrated into the newer highway upon its construction.

The Construction Development Corporation of the Philippines (CDCP) and Monark International worked on the project. CDCP accomplished its task in three years and three months. Phase 2 was completed by Monark in two years and 11 months. The Department of Public Works and Highways (DPWH) designed and supervised the construction of the ₱164 million road project. Phase 1 costs ₱86 million, while ₱78 million was spent for Phase 2. The total amount includes the payment for the right-of-way of former agricultural lands. Some of the farmlots were even donated by the owners.

Throughout its existence, rehabilitation works were made on the highway through replacing existing concrete with newer ones, as evidenced on some portions of the highway before an asphalt overlay is applied into them where cement sections have both grey and white color, as well as demolishing old pavement entirely and replace with newer ones. Since 2000, starting with the highway's Balanga-Orion section, asphalt is placed either on an existing concrete pavement or both the concrete pavement and the asphalt used on its shoulders to extend lifespan of the road using existing ones without being demolished. Recently, some of its portions were widened to accommodate more motorists using it. Recently, some sections of the highway have guard rails to divide the northbound and southbound and lights for better visibility at night.

== Route description ==
The road passes into nine towns (Dinalupihan, Hermosa, Orani, Samal, Abucay, Pilar, Orion, Limay, and Mariveles) and one city (Balanga) in Bataan.

The highway also serves a major utility corridor, carrying various high voltage overhead power lines through densely populated areas where land and right of way acquisition for a normal power line is impractical. Notable power line using the highway's right of way for most or part of their route is the Hermosa–Calaguiman line from Layac Junction in Dinalupihan to Samal. Various power lines also intersect with the highway on some portions, such as the Mariveles–Balsik 500,000 volt, Bataan Combined Cycle Power Plant (BCCPP)–Hermosa, Hermosa–Limay, GNPower–Lamao, and Lamao–Limay 230,000 volt transmission lines.

=== Dinalupihan to Abucay ===
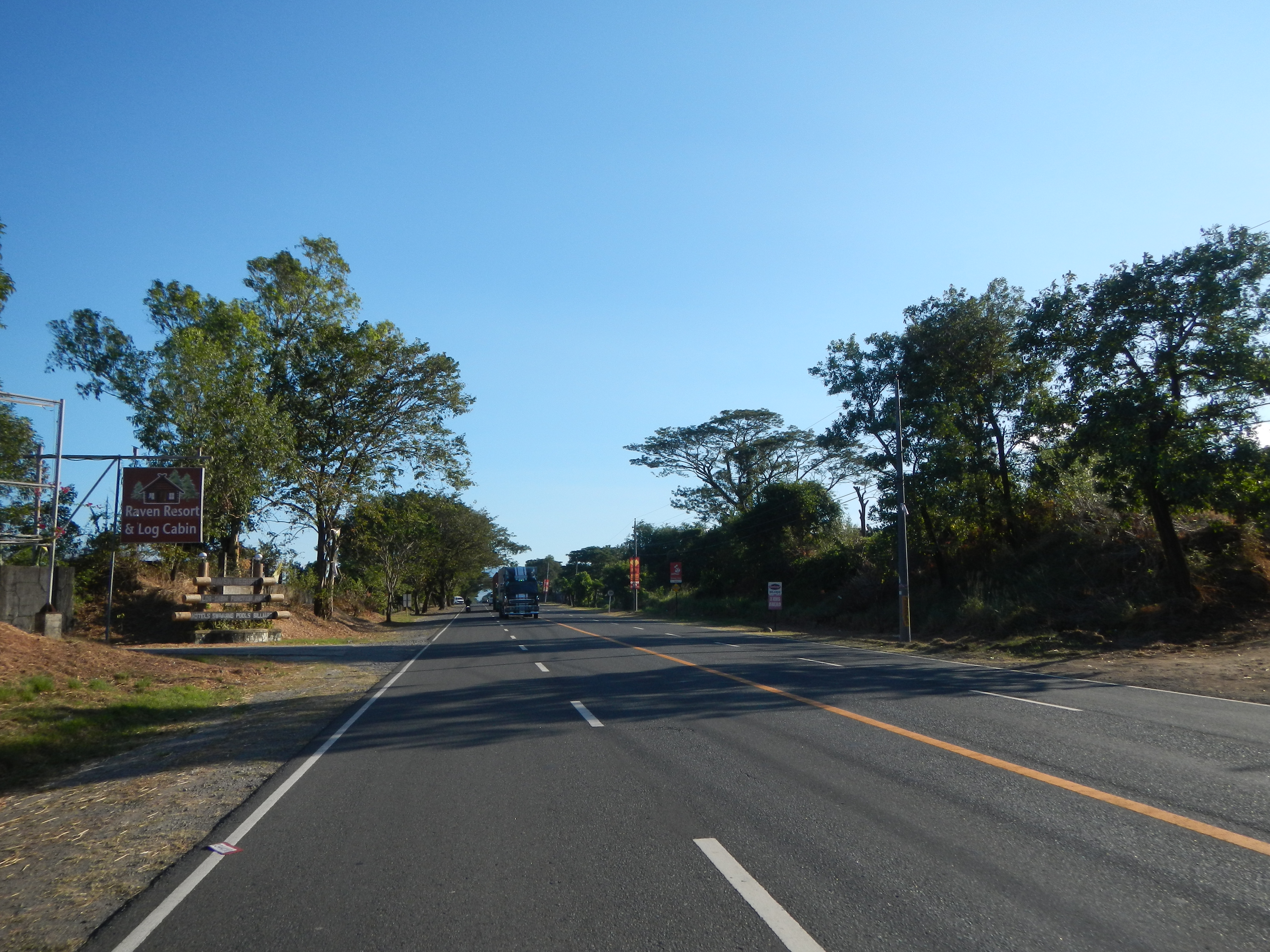
Section of Roman Superhighway in Abucay.

The highway starts at Layac, Dinalupihan at a t-junction with the Jose Abad Santos Avenue (Olongapo-Gapan Road). A short section of the highway from Layac Junction to Layac Bridge was formerly a two lane-road, with the said bridge had two lanes before widening into four lanes after passing Layac Bridge until 2015, making it the only remaining segment of an older road that had not been widened upon its integration into the newer highway. The road turns westward and pass on Palihan Bridges 1 and 2 and between them are rice fields, with this section formerly had lower elevation before the construction of a higher road from 2009 to 2010. The level of the highway will become lower after passing these two bridges. An entrance of Subic-Clark-Tarlac Expressway (SCTEX) can be seen on this area. The road continues straightforward, passing through Hermosa Ecozone Industrial Park, and turns eastward upon paralleling with the Bataan National Road, diverting the highway's alignment from the old existing road.

The highway then passes through residential areas of Hermosa, Bataan before it turns westward and continues on a straight direction. It then passes Mambog Bridge and after passing the said bridge is Beverly Heights V and it will turn eastward and continues on a straight route until it reaches Dona Bridge, where the highway enters Orani. It will cross to San Pedro Street, pass through Dona Elementary School, and continues northbound until it intersects Governor Pascual Avenue, with left going to Orani town proper and right going to Sinagtala and Mount Santa Rosa through Binutas Trail. An office of Department of Public Works and Highways (DPWH) - Bataan 1st District can be found on this portion. After it is Orani Bridge 1. It enters Samal through the Orani Bridge 2. The highway continues on a straight direction and crosses the Samal River through Samal Bridge. A few meters away after the bridge is an entrance to Bataan 2020 and Charoen Pokphand Foods Philippines Corporation. It turns westward after passing Bataan 2020, continues to Barangay Gugo, enters Abucay through Calaguiman Bridge, and continues on a straight direction. Between Ray Hill Bridge is Mabatang Vicinial Road which is a road leading to Barangay Mabatang proper. A subdivision named St. Leonard Homes can be seen after the said bridge. The Mabatang Bridge is located after the subdivision.

It continues northbound, passing through Calaylayan Bridge, and turns eastward. It then passes through Calaylayan Bridge. A few distance from the bridge is the Petron gasoline station. It follows a straight route and before entering Balanga, the Gerry's Grill restaurant can be found.

=== Balanga to Mariveles ===
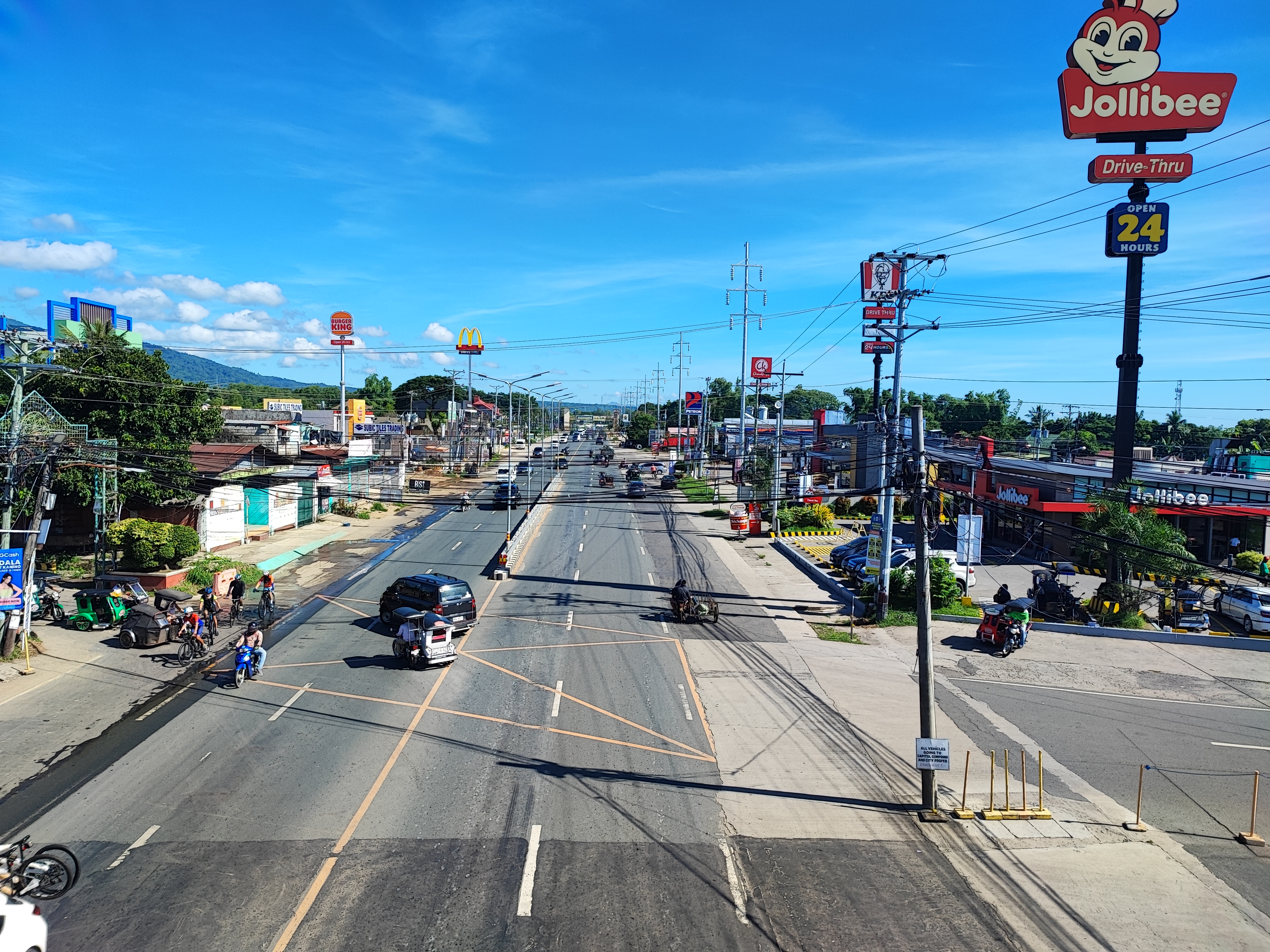
Section of Roman Superhighway traversing Barangay Bagong Silang in Balanga

The highway enters Balanga upon passing Toyota Bataan and then passes to Tuyo Bridge where the former location of Balanga welcome sign is located which was removed due to the highway's widening after the said bridge. After passing the former welcome marker mentioned before, a Camella Homes subdivision can be seen at this portion. The road continues on a straight direction, intersects with Tuyo Vicinal Road, and passing through Penelco main headquarters. A four-lane road named Enrique Garcia Sr. Avenue (named after the Bataan former governor) is located near Penelco headquarters. Pass the four-lane road is Tenejero Bridge. The National Food Authority (NFA) Bataan can be seen after the bridge. It then passes through barangays Munting Batangas where the road turns westward, Camacho, Tenejero after the Tenejero 2 Bridge, Bagong Silang, Cataning, Cupang Proper, and Central. Various schools and malls can be found along the Balanga portion of the highway such as the Bataan National High School, Bataan Heroes College, Vista Mall Bataan, and Waltermart Balanga.

After Barangay Central, it enters Pilar through Talisay Bridge. It passes mostly on rice paddies within the municipality but on Barangay Alauli, there is an intersection of the highway, the Alauli Flyover, and Governor J.J. Linao Road. Various establishments can be found near the intersection, such as the Total gas station. It turns westward and enters Orion through Campot Bridge. It continues northbound and passes through various barangay within Orion. Between Daan Pare and Puting Buhangin exits, the highway and Bataan National Road combine temporarily. The highway enters Limay and will pass on some subdivisions such as Trivea Residences. It continues on a straight direction and turns eastward, passing to Mamala and T. Kaliwa Bridges, with Petron Limay station between them. It then passes to Limay Overpass and the entrances of Emerald Coast Executive Village are found on both sides of the highway a few meters after the said overpass. The road turns westward and eastward, then it will pass on a terminus of Bataan National Road where the highway and old existing road again combine. After the terminus of Bataan National Road is Alangan Bridge. It turns eastward and westward, continuing on a straight route, then passes with Petron Bataan Refinery, SMC Consolidated Power Plant, Ayam Bridge, Orica Philippines, Inc., and Lamao Bridge.

The highway then enters Mariveles after passing the Lamao Bridge. It passes through barangays Batangas II (a Philippine National Oil Company (PNOC) plant and PPDC Park can be seen within the barangay), Lucanin, Cabcaben (where the highway parallels with Old National Road), Mt. View (where the Old National Road ends and Blessed Regina Protmann Catholic School (BRPCS) is located), and Alasasin. It continues to Baseco Country through Freeport Area of Bataan (FAB) checkpoint where the Mariveles substation of National Grid Corporation of the Philippines (NGCP) and Mariveles Coal-Fired Power Plant are visible from the highway and a bypass road going to Sisiman is located. The highway then passes the Zigzag Road. After Zigzag Road, it passes through the Freeport Area of Bataan (FAB) compound, Death March marker upon exiting the FAB compound, Jollibee Mariveles, Mariveles Municipal Hall, and the highway ends at Mariveles Bridge.

== Intersections ==
The entire route is located in Bataan. Intersections are numbered by kilometer post, with Rizal Park in Manila designated as kilometer 0.

City/Municipality	km	mi	Destinations	Notes
Dinalupihan	101	63	N3 (Jose Abad Santos Avenue) – Zambales, Pangasinan, Angeles, Hermosa (Balsik), San Fernando, Nueva Ecija, Metro Manila, Batangas City, Batangas	Northern terminus. Westbound to Dinalupihan town proper, Zambales, and Pangasinan; northeast-bound goes to Hermosa (Balsik)
Hermosa	102	63	E4 (SCTEX Dinalupihan Exit) – Baguio, La Union, Pangasinan, Tarlac, Angeles City, Zambales	
Hermosa			Bataan National Road – Orani, Samal	Access to Hermosa town proper.
Orani			Governor Pascual Road	Access to Orani town proper.
Orani			Masapsap Road	Access to Orani town proper.
Samal			Imelda–Lalawigan Road	Access to Samal town proper.
Abucay			Mabatang Vicinal Road	
Abucay			Catmon Road	Access to Abucay town proper.
Abucay			Laon Road	Access to Abucay town proper.
Abucay			Decena Avenue / Dominican Hills Avenue	Eastbound to Abucay Town Proper; Westbound on Dominican Hills Avenue to Colegio de San Juan de Letran, Bataan campus.
Abucay			Capitangan Vicinal Road	
Balanga			Tuyo Vicinal Road	
Balanga			Enrique Garcia Sr. Avenue	Access to Balanga City proper.
Balanga			Balanga Cadre Road / Munting Batangas Road	
Balanga			Dr. F. Anacleto Avenue	Access to Balanga City proper.
Balanga			Fiscal Camacho Street	
Balanga			Maluang Road	
Balanga			Maluya Road	
Pilar	125	78	N302 (Governor Joaquin J. Linao Road) – Bagac, Morong, Zambales, Pangasinan	Ala-uli Crossing. Westbound to Bagac and Morong, eastbound to Pilar town proper.
Orion			Camino Road	
Orion			Teodoro del Rosario Street	Access to Orion town proper.
Orion			Bataan National Road – Orion, Samal, Balanga, Abucay	
Orion	131	81	N303 (Bataan National Road) – Limay	Northern end of Orion–Limay national road segment.
Limay			De Ocampo Street	
Limay	136	85	N303 (Bataan National Road) – Orion	Southern end of Orion–Limay national road segment.
Mariveles			Cabcaben Road	
Mariveles			Kamaya Point Road	
Mariveles			Mariveles Scenic Bypass Road	Northern end of bypass road.
Mariveles			Avenue of the Philippines	
Mariveles			Mariveles Scenic Bypass Road	Southern end of bypass road.
Mariveles			Luzon Avenue	
Mariveles			F. Zalavarria Street	Access to Mariveles town proper.
Mariveles			Lakandula Street / Padre Burgos Street	Access to Mariveles town proper.
Mariveles	165	103	N301 (Mariveles–Talaga Bay Road) / Mariveles–Bagac Road – Bagac, Morong, Zambales, Pangasinan	Southern terminus.
1.000 mi = 1.609 km; 1.000 km = 0.621 mi
