= Jose Abad Santos Avenue =

Major highway in Central Luzon

Jose Abad Santos Avenue
- Olongapo–Gapan Road; Gapan–San Fernando–Olongapo Road
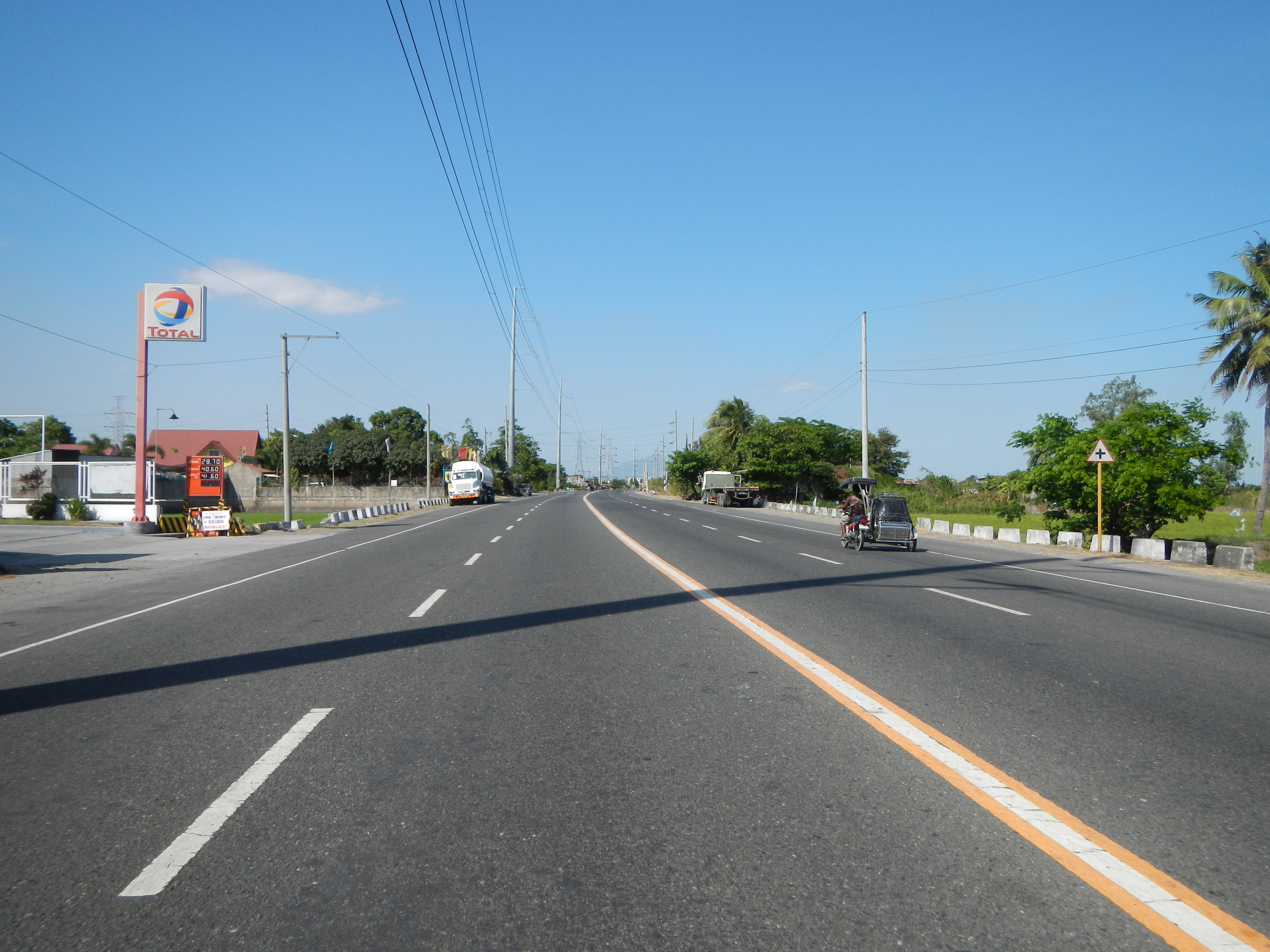
- Section of the Olongapo–Gapan Road at Barangay Santa Monica, Lubao, Pampanga

Route information
- Maintained by the Department of Public Works and Highways; Zambales 2nd District Engineering Office; Bataan 1st and 3rd District Engineering Office; Pampanga 1st and 2nd District Engineering Office; Nueva Ecija 2nd District Engineering Office
- Component highways: N3

Major junctions
- East end: AH 26 (N1) (Pan-Philippine Highway) in Gapan
- E1 (North Luzon Expressway) in San Fernando, Pampanga; N2 (MacArthur Highway) in San Fernando, Pampanga; N246 (Lubao Bypass Road) in Lubao; N301 (Roman Superhighway) in Dinalupihan, Bataan; N214 in Dinalupihan, Bataan; E4 (Subic Freeport Expressway) in Dinalupihan, Bataan
- West end: N305 (Rizal Avenue) / N306 (Olongapo–Bugallon Road) in Olongapo

Location
- Country: Philippines
- Provinces: Bataan, Nueva Ecija, Pampanga, Zambales
- Major cities: Gapan, San Fernando, Olongapo
- Towns: Dinalupihan, Hermosa, Lubao, Guagua, Bacolor, Mexico, Santa Ana, Arayat, Cabiao, San Isidro

Highway system
- Roads in the Philippines; Highways; Expressways; List
← N2	→ N4

Jose Abad Santos Avenue (JASA), also known as the Olongapo–Gapan Road and the Gapan–San Fernando–Olongapo Road, is a two-to-thirteen-lane 118-kilometer (73 mi) major highway spanning the provinces of Bataan, Nueva Ecija, Pampanga, and Zambales in Central Luzon, Philippines. The highway is designated as National Route 3 (N3) of the Philippine highway network.

== Etymology ==
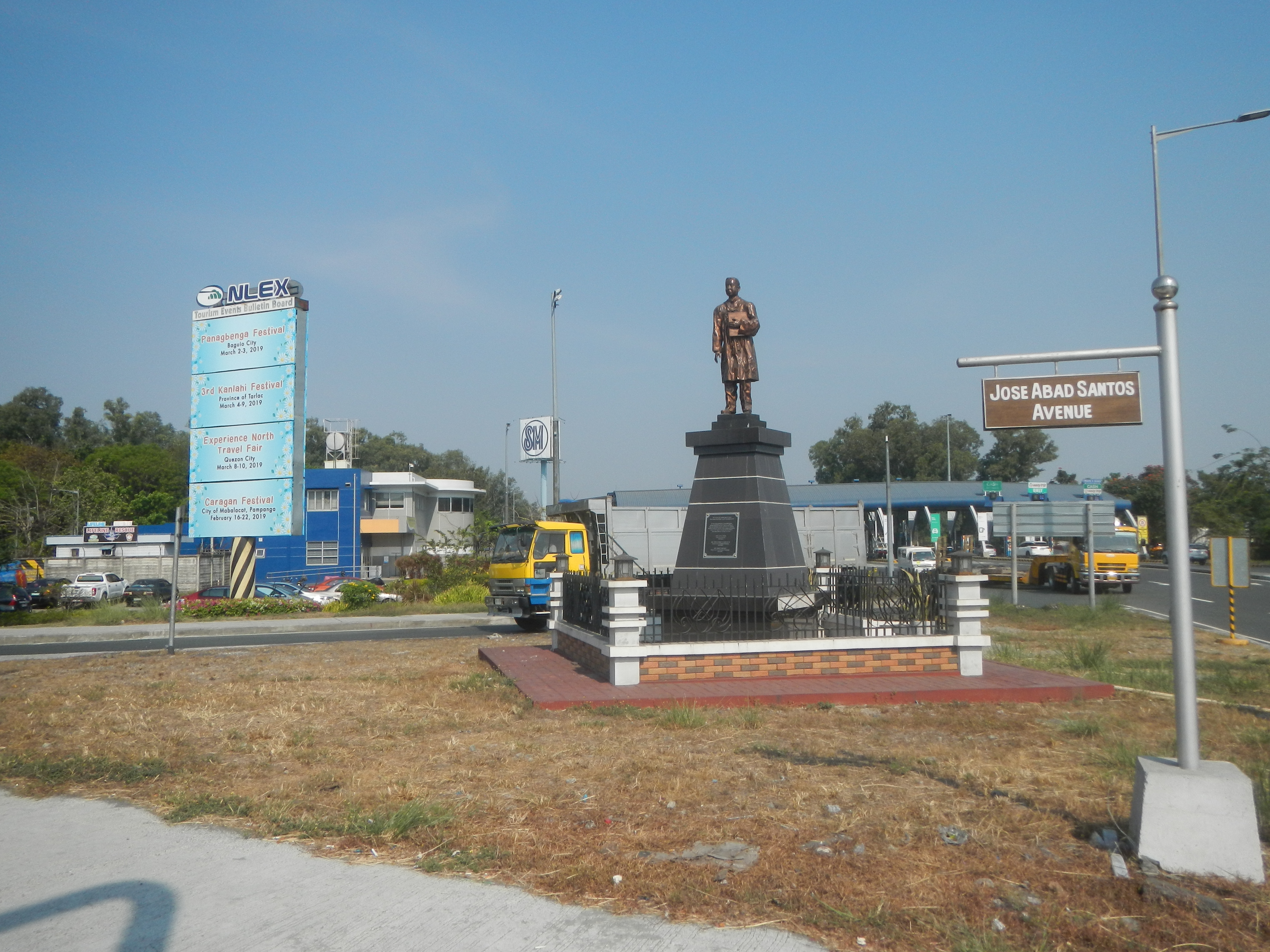
Statue of Chief Justice José Abad Santos, to whom the road is named for, at NLEX–San Fernando Exit. Seen on the right is a street sign of the road.

Jose Abad Santos Avenue is named in honor of José Abad Santos, Chief Justice of the Supreme Court of the Philippines, who was executed by the Japanese invading forces during World War II. Abad Santos was born in San Fernando, Pampanga, through which the road passes. The avenue's former names once varied, suggesting its segments between two adjacent provinces. It was formerly known as Bataan–Pampanga Road, Nueva Ecija–Pampanga Road, and the Dinalupihan–Olongapo (Bataan–Zambales) segment of Angeles–Porac–Olongapo Road, respectively. The segment between Olongapo and Dinalupihan, Bataan, is also known as Olongapo–Bataan Road. The entire stretch was formerly called Olongapo–Gapan Road and Gapan–San Fernando–Olongapo Road (GSO Road). The name was changed in line with Republic Act No. 9477 signed by President Gloria Macapagal Arroyo on May 22, 2007. Nowadays, the avenue is commonly referred to by its acronym JASA; however, its old name is still used.

However, the avenue's segment in Olongapo city proper is a part of and locally known as Rizal Avenue, after the Philippine national hero Dr. José Rizal, for being the road that leads to Manila.

== Route description ==
The road passes to Gapan, San Isidro, and Cabiao in Nueva Ecija, Arayat, Santa Ana, Mexico, San Fernando, Bacolor, Guagua, and Lubao in Pampanga, Hermosa and Dinalupihan in Bataan, and finally to the city of Olongapo in Zambales.

The highway also serves a major utility corridor, carrying various high voltage overhead power lines through densely populated areas where acquisition and designation of right of way or power line alignment and lands for their associated structures is impractical. Notable power lines using the highway's right of way for most or part of their route are the Hermosa–Duhat–Balintawak transmission line from Hermosa Substation of National Grid Corporation of the Philippines (NGCP) to San Fernando Exit of North Luzon Expressway (NLEx) and Hermosa–Calaguiman line from NGCP Hermosa Substation in Hermosa to Layac Junction in Dinalupihan. The San Fernando segment of the Hermosa–Duhat–Balintawak line itself is undergoing relocation since 2001 originally to replace the steel poles affected by lahars from Mount Pinatubo at Magliman section, and later from February 2011, to alleviate heavy traffic along the avenue due to the presence of its electric poles standing on the highway itself, and to pave the way for the expansion of some segments of the avenue, particularly at Barangay Dolores.

=== Gapan to San Fernando ===
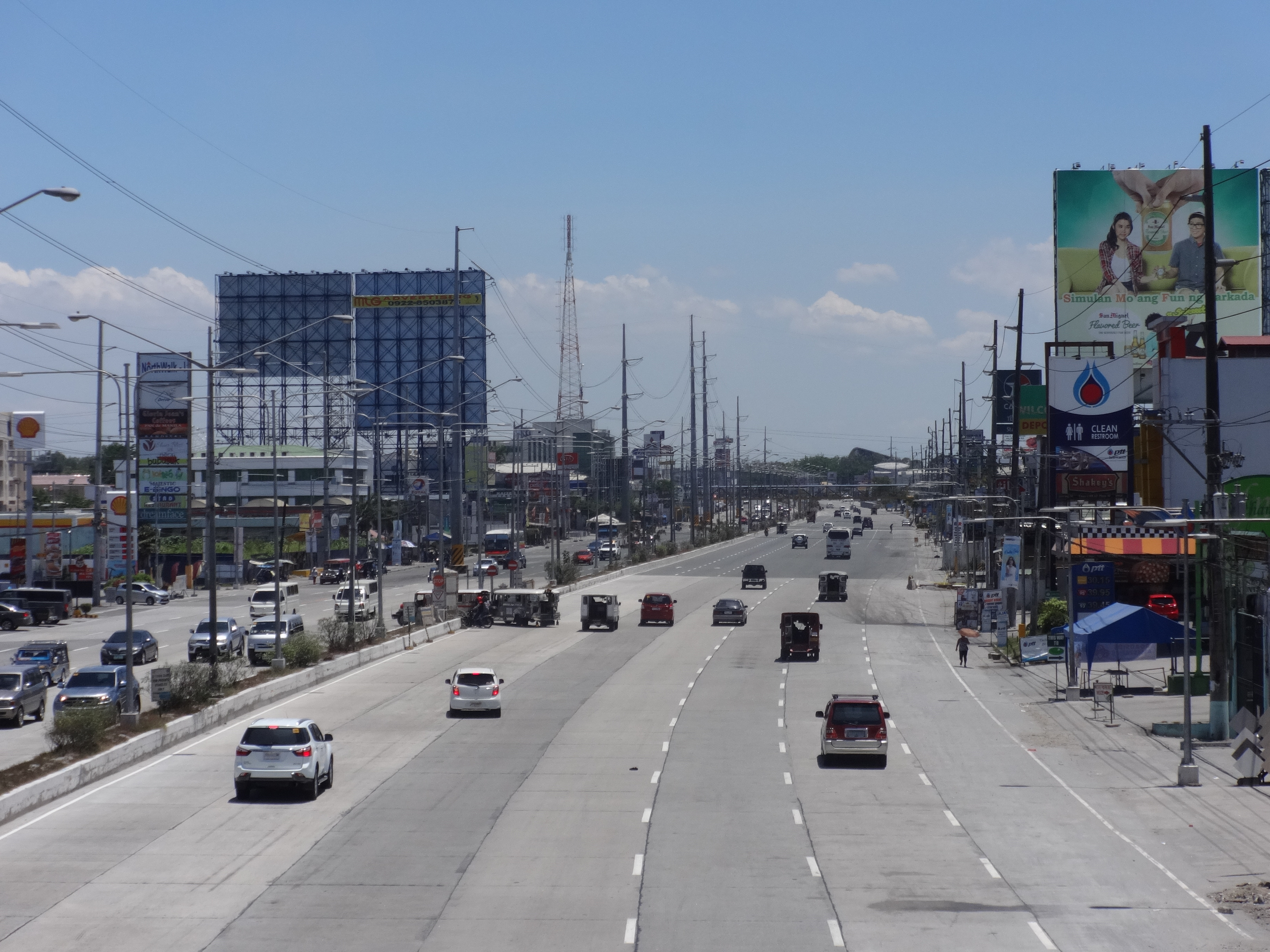
A portion of the road between MacArthur Highway and North Luzon Expressway (NLEx) in San Fernando, Pampanga

The road starts on Pan-Philippine Highway (N1/AH26) in the city of Gapan in Nueva Ecija. It enters San Isidro where the road turns westward. A few meters is Cabiao where the road continues straightforward, again turning westward then eastward, entering Pampanga, and passes through Pampanga River. It then passes through residential areas and institutions within the municipalities of Arayat, Santa Ana, and Mexico before entering San Fernando. The road turns west at the Santo Domingo Circle in Mexico and turns south at its intersection with Arayat–Mexico Road in Mexico poblacion. The SM City Pampanga and Robinsons Starmills malls can be seen on a boundary between Mexico and San Fernando. It intersects with North Luzon Expressway after passing these two malls. It crosses MacArthur Highway through Dolores Flyover, continues on a straight route, with its city proper being visible from the highway, with another flyover named Lazatin Flyover through Lazatin Boulevard. A few meters past the flyover is San Fernando Central Transport Terminal. The city's welcome sign could be located on this portion and after it, the highway enters Bacolor.

=== Bacolor to Olongapo ===
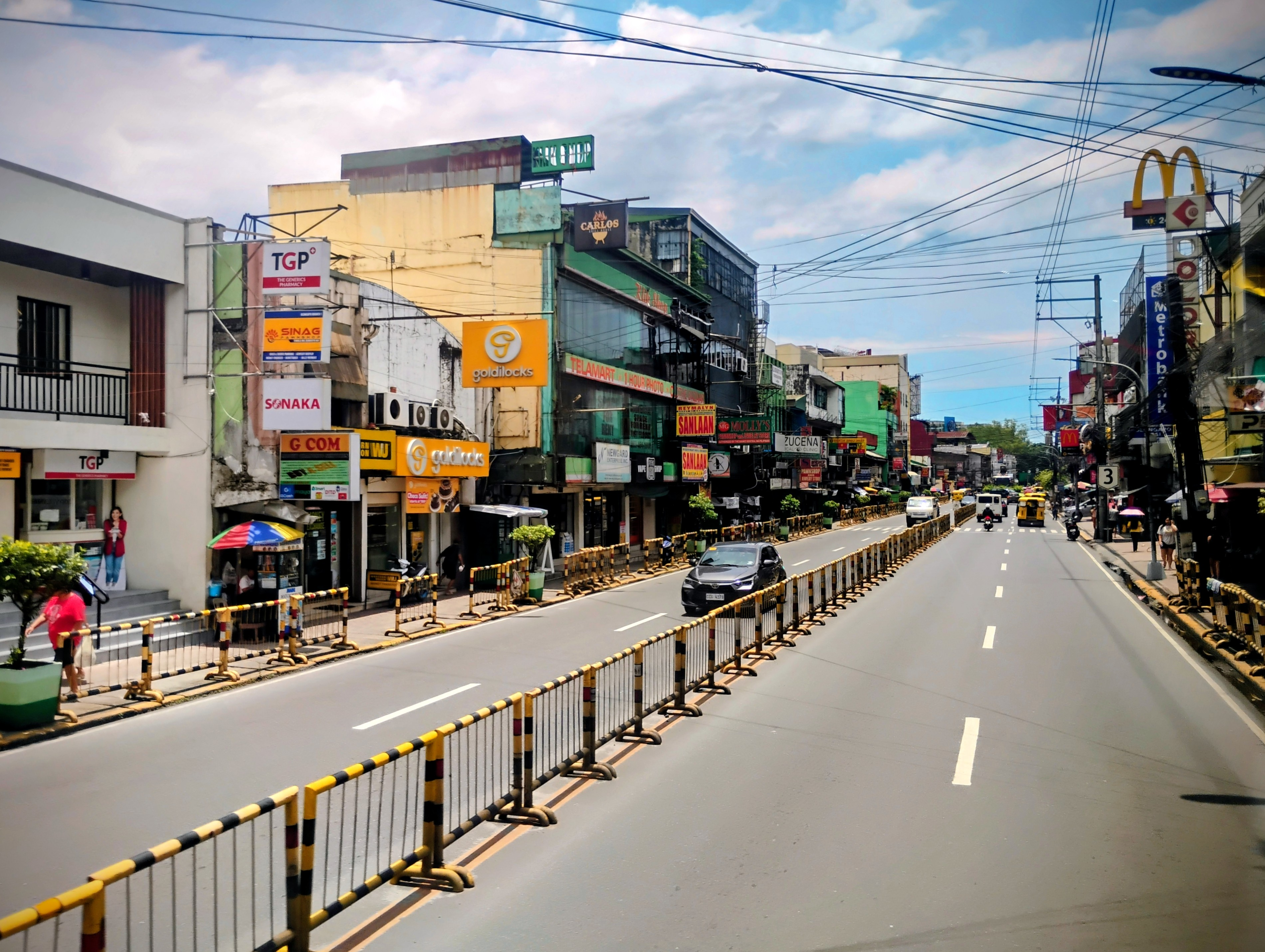
The road as Rizal Avenue in Olongapo

Upon entering Bacolor, the road turns eastward and passes through the lahar-filled Pasig-Potrero River. It passes through Bacolor town proper, with its parish church being visible from the highway. It continues on a straight direction, intersects with Guagua-Santa Rita Provincial Road and San Antonio-Siran Road, turns westward, and enters Lubao after passing the second road mentioned before. It continues straightforward, passing through residential areas and establishments within the municipality and parallels the Lubao Old National Road.

It then enters Bataan through the Pampanga Welcome marker and traverses the municipalities of Hermosa and Dinalupihan, where it turns northward at the Layac Junction. It then bypasses the poblacion, turns westward, and crosses below the Subic–Clark–Tarlac Expressway (SCTEX). It then parallels into it, continues on a straight direction, passings through barangays San Benito, Colo, Naparing, Happy Valley, and Roosevelt National Park Protected Area, and the eastern end of Subic Freeport Expressway. It enters Zambales a few meters after the said exit and continues on a zigzag pattern before passing through residential areas within Olongapo. The road then enters the city proper of Olongapo, where it is locally known as Rizal Avenue, and continues towards National Highway (N306) at its terminus at the Ulo ng Apo Rotonda.

== History ==
Jose Abad Santos Avenue traces its roots to the pre-colonial period. The Kapampangan empire expanded their trade throughout Central Luzon but were forced to create roads adjacent to the Pampanga River. Since Nueva Ecija, Bulacan, and Manila were readily accessible because the road networks to those locations existed, the empire could not access the provinces of Zambales and Bataan. Through the years, they developed land tracks accessible by foot and small wagons pulled by horses.

When the Spanish colonials came in the Philippines, they developed the road built by the old empire. They widened the road, constructed wooden bridges, and connected it to Olongapo, a very vital location which enabled them to easily access Subic Bay, the site of their naval base.

When the Americans came, they paved the Olongapo Gapan Road and constructed concrete bridges. The longest is the one that traverses the Pampanga River. These actions enabled them to connect their Clark Air Base and their Naval Base in Subic Bay. Greater improvements on the road were made in this period.

When World War II started, the Olongapo–Gapan Road was blockaded, halting transportation throughout the entire span of the road. The Japanese bombed the road to stop the Americans and Filipinos from the fortification of different bases in Central Luzon. During this time, the road was part of Highway 7 from Olongapo to San Fernando and Highway 10 from San Fernando to Gapan. It used a different alignment from Guagua to Mexico that currently exists as the San Antonio–Floridablanca Road, San Fernando–Lubao Road, Capitol Boulevard, and Consunji Road.

After the end of the War, the Philippine Government rehabilitated and repaired the whole road, paving all of the highway. New bridges were constructed, shoulders were improved and some facilities were added. The highway's new alignment from Guagua to Mexico was built, diverting it away from the town propers of Guagua, Bacolor, and San Fernando.

Due to the Mount Pinatubo eruption and its resulting lahars caused by heavy rains from 1991 to 1995, the highway's Bacolor and Magliman, San Fernando, portions were buried in lahar and many bridges were destroyed. At the aftermath of the disaster, these sections were rehabilitated, which involved building new roads and bridges and construction of an embankment which made their elevation become higher to withstand further lahar flows. In recent years especially after lahars from Mount Pinatubo buried some sections of the road, the highway underwent widening which added more lanes to accommodate more vehicles using the road.

Today, Olongapo–Gapan Road, now called Jose Abad Santos Avenue and designated as National Route 3 of the Philippine highway network, is the most significant toll-free road that connects Nueva Ecija, Pampanga, Bataan, and Zambales.

== Intersections ==
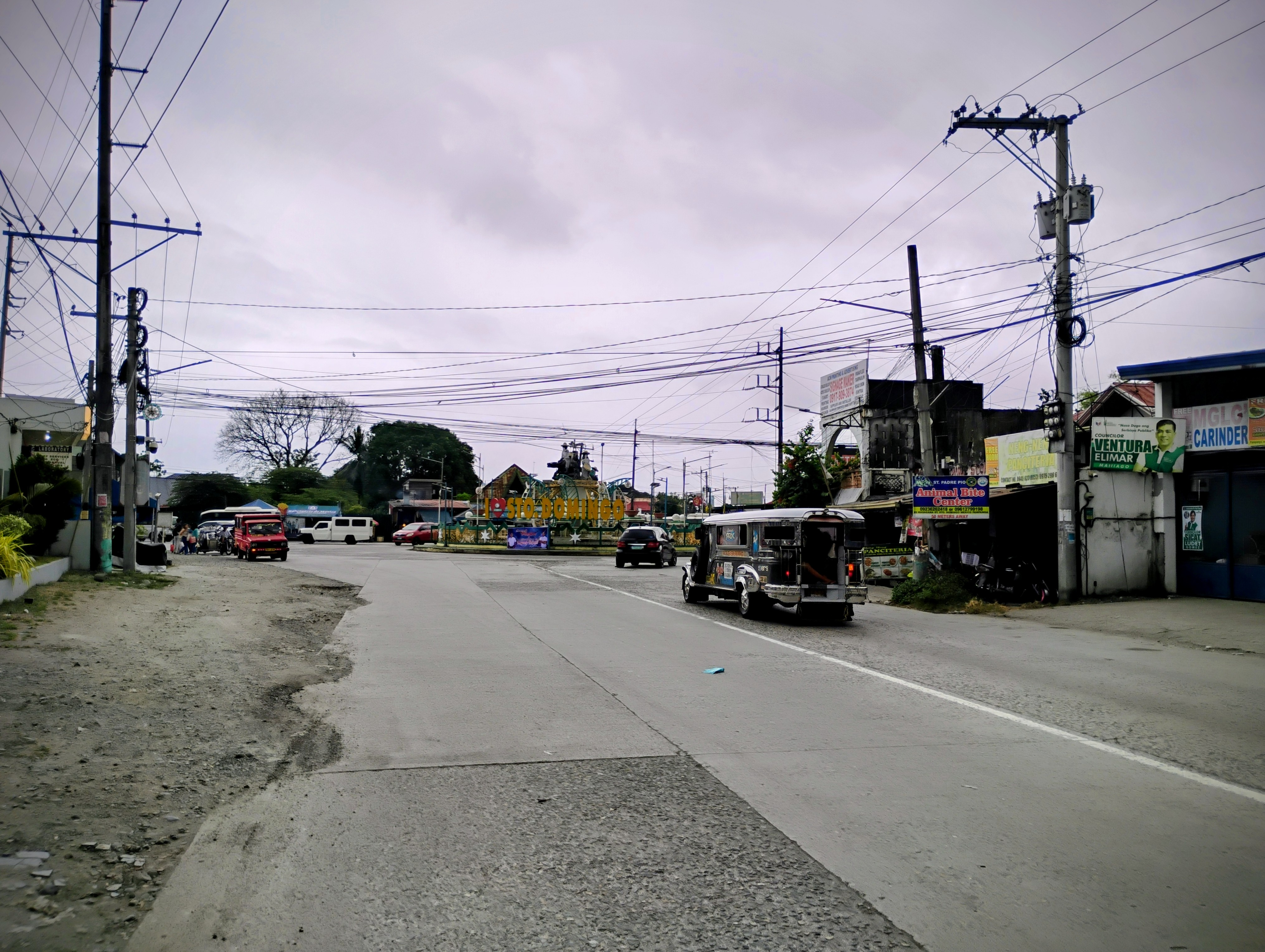
Santo Domingo Circle in Mexico, Pampanga, a turning point of the avenue

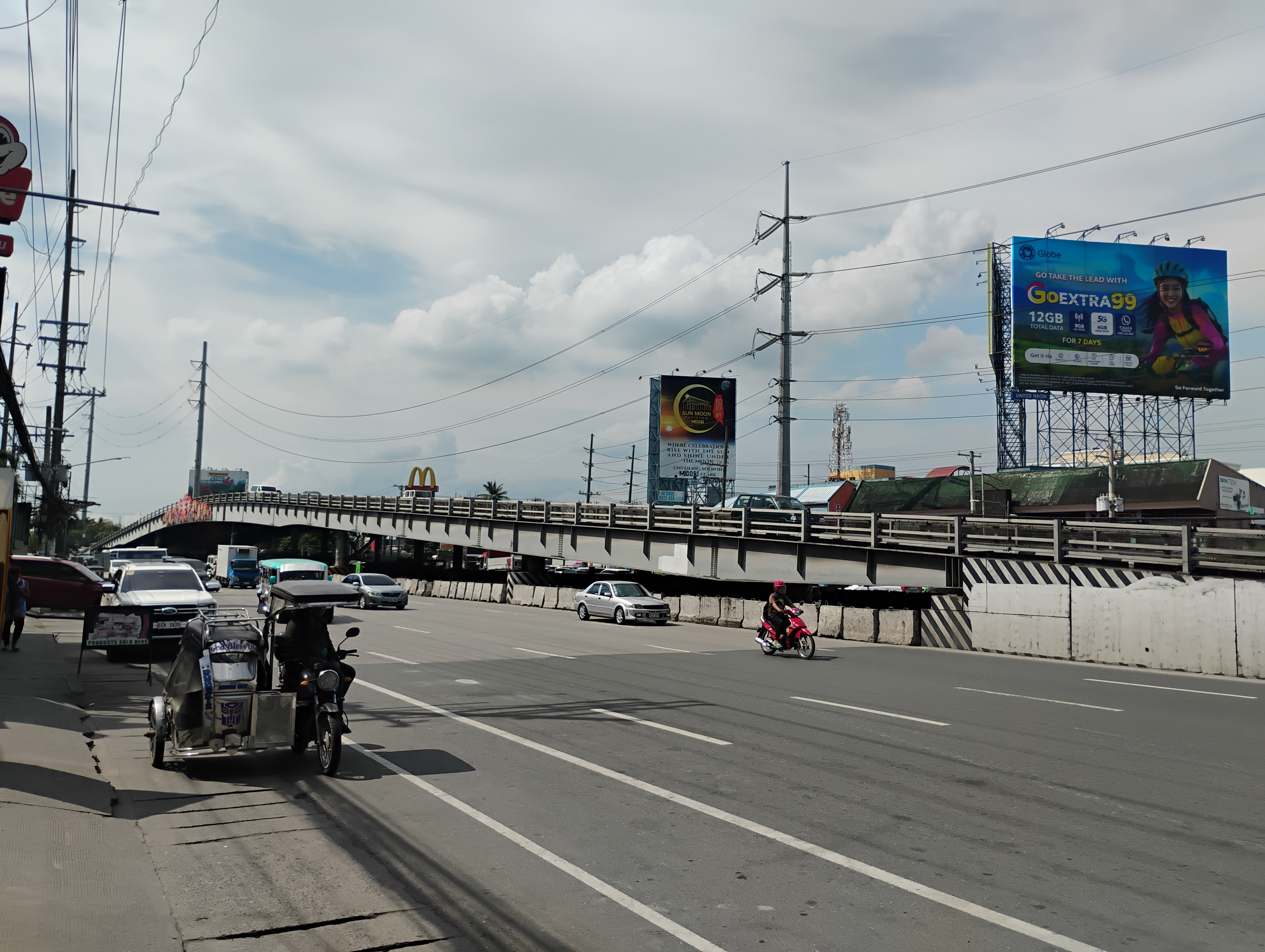
Dolores Flyover crossing MacArthur Highway in San Fernando, Pampanga

This entire route is located in Central Luzon. Intersections are numbered by kilometer posts, with Rizal Park in Manila designated as kilometer zero.

Province	City/Municipality	km	mi	Destinations	Notes
Nueva Ecija	Gapan	90	56	AH 26 (N1) (Pan-Philippine Highway)	Eastern terminus
Nueva Ecija	San Isidro			San Isidro-Jaen Road	
Pampanga–Nueva Ecija boundary	Arayat–Cabiao boundary			Nueva Ecija Welcome Arch; Pampanga 1st District Engineering Office–Nueva Ecija 2nd District Engineering Office highway boundary	
Pampanga	Arayat	87.9	54.6	Mt. Arayat National Park Road	Serves Mt. Arayat National Park
Pampanga	Arayat	81.5	50.6	Arayat–Magalang Road	
Pampanga	Santa Ana			Baliwag–Candaba–Santa Ana Road	
Pampanga	Mexico			Bahay Pare–San Luis–Santo Domingo Road / Tulauc–Santo Domingo Road	Roundabout intersection
Pampanga	Mexico			Mexico-Magalang Road	
Pampanga	Mexico			San Fernando–Lagundi Road	
Pampanga	San Fernando	65	40	E1 (North Luzon Expressway)	NLEX-San Fernando Exit, crosses above NLEX
Pampanga	San Fernando			N2 (MacArthur Highway)	Crossing motorists are carried by Dolores Flyover
Pampanga	San Fernando			Lazatin Boulevard	Crossing motorists are carried by Lazatin Flyover
Pampanga	Bacolor			Mega Dike Access Road	
Pampanga	Bacolor			Don Ceferino Joven Street	Access to Bacolor town proper
Pampanga	Guagua			Guagua-Porac Road	
Pampanga	Guagua			San Antonio–Floridablanca Road	
Pampanga	Lubao			San Fernando–Lubao Road	
Pampanga	Lubao			Lubao Access Road	Both termini at Jose Abad Santos Avenue
Bataan–Pampanga boundary	Hermosa–Lubao boundary			Pampanga Welcome Arch	
Bataan	Hermosa	101	63	Sitio Pinagpala Road	
Bataan	Dinalupihan	101	63	N301 (Roman Superhighway)	Northern Terminus of N301
Bataan	Dinalupihan			N214 (Angeles–Porac–Floridablanca–Dinalupihan Road)	Locally known as J.P. Rizal Street
Bataan	Dinalupihan			N214 (Tabacan Poblacion Road)	Locally known as General Luna Street
Bataan	Dinalupihan			E4 (Subic Freeport Expressway)	
Zambales–Bataan boundary	Olongapo–Dinalupihan boundary			Olongapo Welcome Arch	
Olongapo				Argonaut Highway	Start of Rizal Avenue segment
Olongapo				N305 (Rizal Avenue) / N306 (Olongapo–Bugallon Road)	Ulo ng Apo roundabout. Western terminus.
1.000 mi = 1.609 km; 1.000 km = 0.621 mi

== Landmarks ==
The façade of SM City Pampanga

The Jose Abad Santos Avenue spans for about 118 kilometers (73 mi), thus, many establishments and landmarks are built alongside the highway. This landmarks are malls, historical sites, government facilities, and many more other establishments. Two major shopping malls along the road are SM City Pampanga, the second largest mall in Northern and Central Luzon, and Robinsons Starmills Pampanga.

This list is from northeast to southwest:

=== Nueva Ecija ===
- San Isidro Municipal Hall (San Isidro, Nueva Ecija)
- Cabiao Municipal Hall (Cabiao)

=== Pampanga ===
- Arayat Municipal Hall (Arayat, Pampanga)
- Santa Ana Municipal Hall (Santa Ana, Pampanga)
- Rotonda Santo Domingo (Mexico, Pampanga)
- Mexico Municipal Hall (Mexico)
- SM City Pampanga (Mexico/San Fernando, Pampanga)
- Robinsons Starmills (San Fernando)
- Diosdado Macapagal Medical Center (Guagua)
- Mary the Queen College (Guagua)
- Lubao Municipal Hall (Lubao)

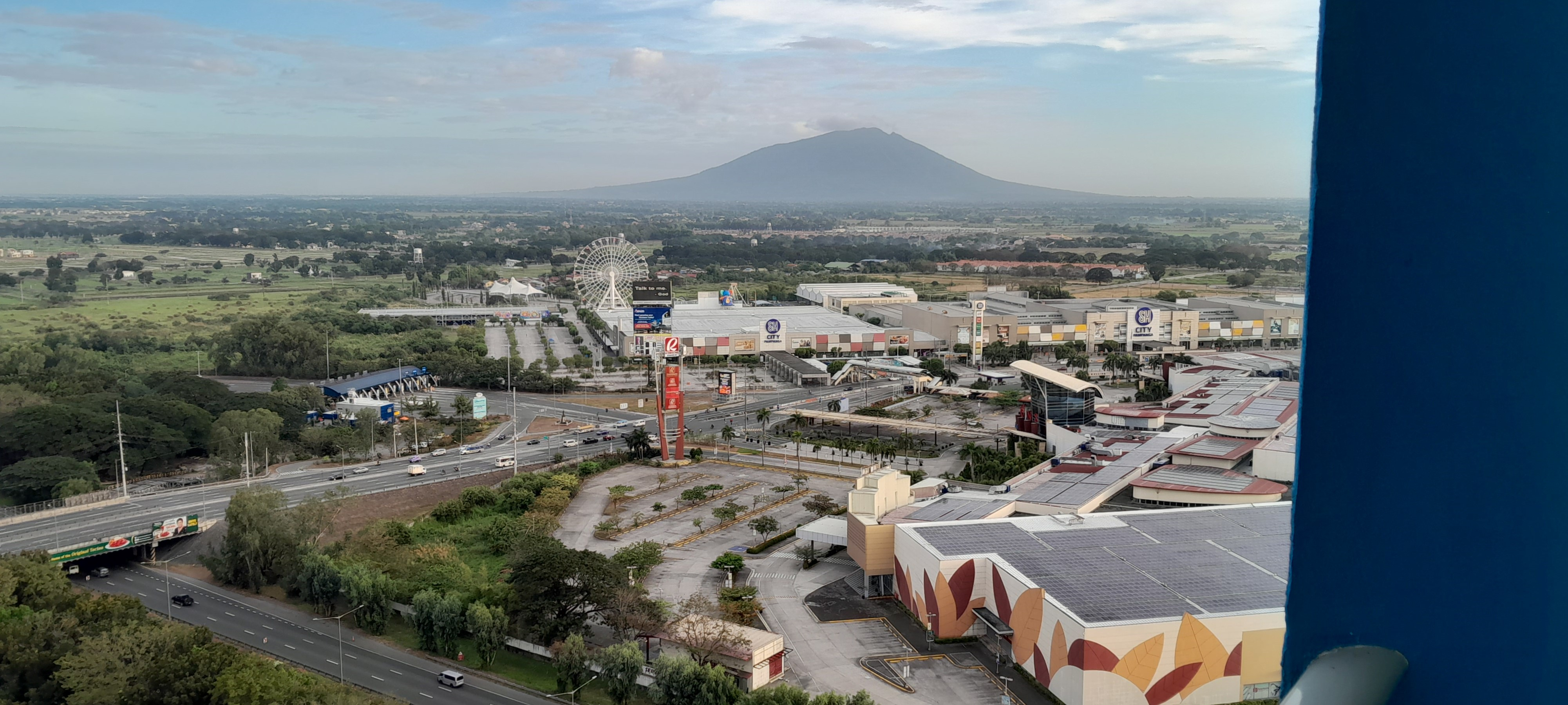
A northeastward shot of the avenue (longer road in photo) between SM City Pampanga (behind the avenue) and Robinsons Starmills (foreground) taken from Azure North Pampanga. The avenue's bridge part at left crosses over the North Luzon Expressway. On the horizon is Mount Arayat

=== Bataan ===
- World War II Last Stand Memorial (Hermosa, Bataan)
- Dinalupihan Municipal Hall (Dinalupihan)

=== Olongapo ===
- Olongapo City Hall (Olongapo)
- Ulo ng Apo Roundabout (Olongapo)
