= SM City Pampanga =

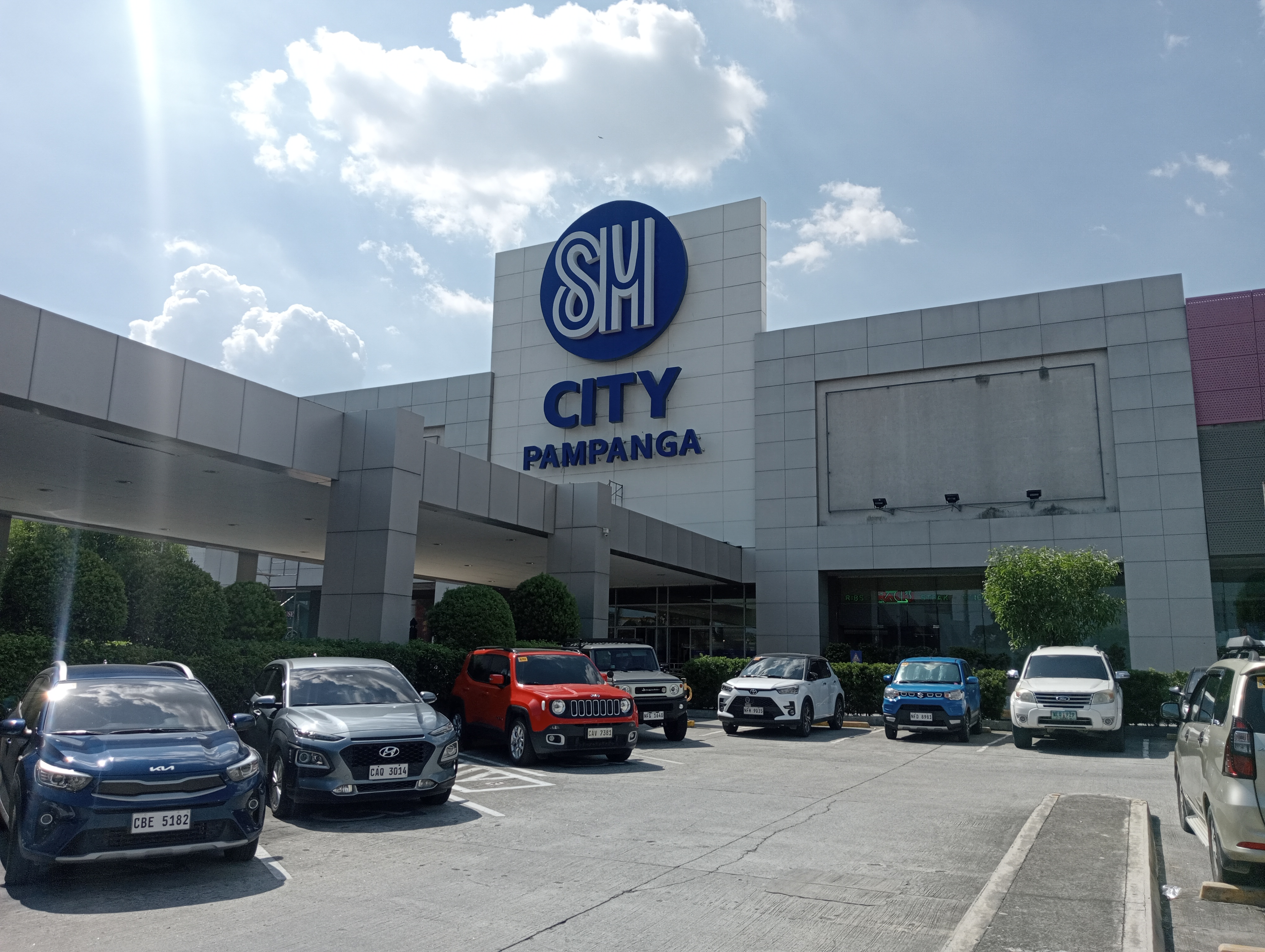
- The facade of SM City Pampanga in June 2023
- Location: Olongapo-Gapan Road, Barangay Lagundi, Mexico, Pampanga (East Wing) and Barangay San Jose, San Fernando, Pampanga, Philippines
- Coordinates: 15°03′09″N 120°41′57″E
- Opened: November 11, 2000; 25 years ago
- Developer: SM Prime Holdings
- Manager: SM Prime Holdings
- Architect: Palafox Associates
- Num. of stores: 300+
- Num. of anchor tenants: 12
- Floor area: 132,484 m^{2} (1,426,050 sq ft)
- Floors: Main Building: 3 Annex One:1; Annex Two: 1 Annex Three: 1
- Website: SM City Pampanga

SM City Pampanga is a shopping mall owned and operated by SM Prime Holdings. It is located along the Jose Abad Santos Avenue (formerly Olongapo-Gapan Road) in San Fernando and Mexico in the province of Pampanga. It has a land area of 31 ha (3,300,000 sq ft) and a total gross floor area of 132,484 m^{2} (1,426,050 sq ft). It is the first SM Supermall in Central Luzon, is currently the second largest shopping mall in Northern and Central Luzon, and is the longest mall in the Philippines. The shopping mall is composed of the Main Building, Annex 1, Annex 2 and Annex 3. The mall's exterior facade and interior has similarities to SM City Davao and SM City CDO Uptown.

== Location ==
SM City Pampanga is located along Jose Abad Santos Avenue (formerly Olongapo-Gapan Road), corner North Luzon Expressway, Barangay San Jose, City of San Fernando, and Barangay Lagundi, Mexico. The mall's east wing (Building 4) is located along the Jose Abad Santos Avenue, Barangay Lagundi, Mexico, Pampanga. On the rest of the mall complex, (Annex 1, Main Mall and Annex 2) is located on the same road but this time part of the City of San Fernando. The mall is adjacent to both the San Fernando Exit of the North Luzon Expressway and to the Robinsons Starmills Pampanga.

== Physical details ==
The mall opened on November 11, 2000. An annex (building 2) was added in October 2002. Annex 3 (building 3), added 99,439 square meters to the mall's gross floor area. The newest annex (Building 4) opened in October 2007 with an additional 16,700 square meters of floor area.

== Features ==
=== Sky Ranch ===
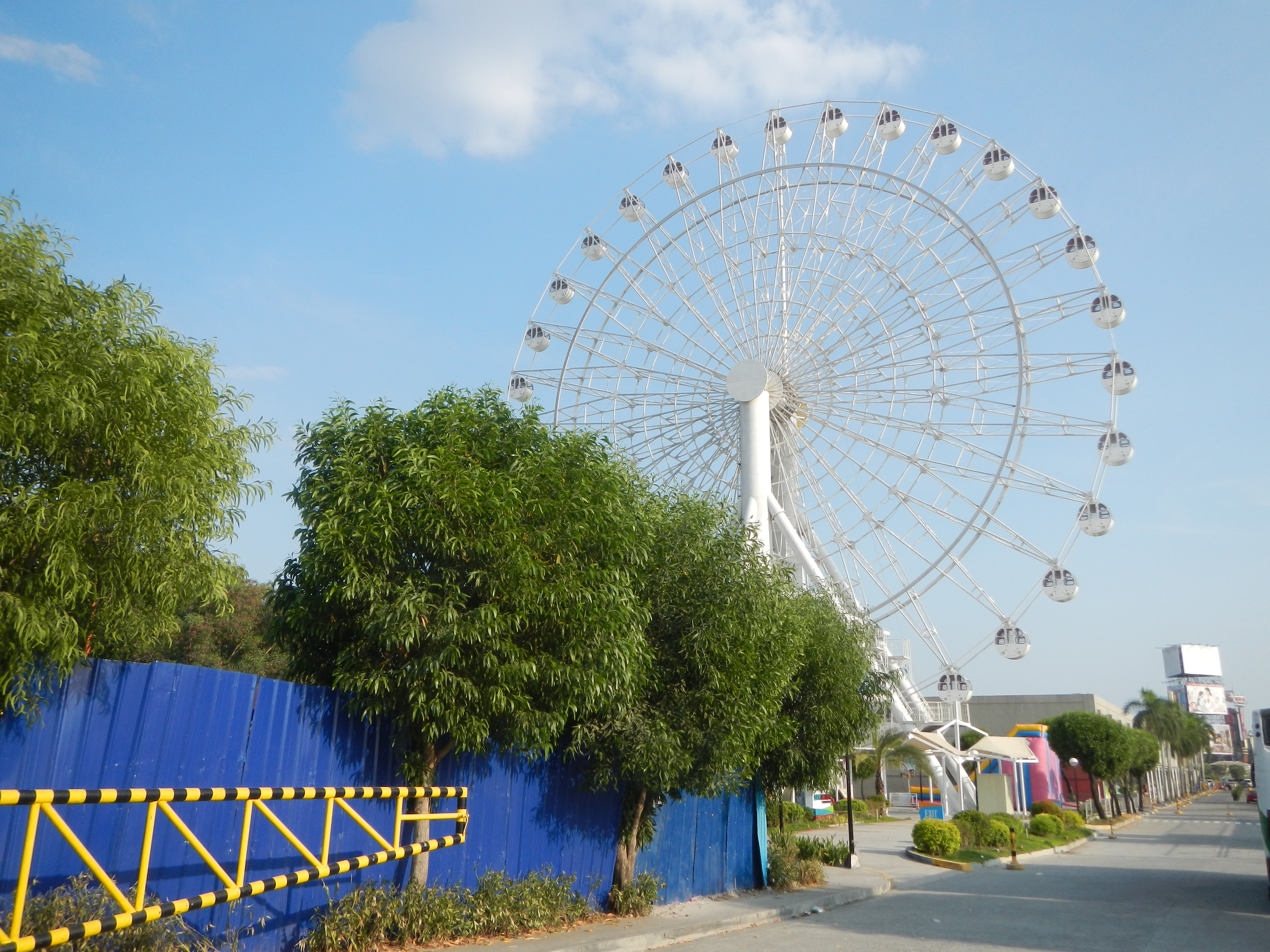
Sky Ranch Pampanga

Sky Ranch Pampanga opened on November 30, 2014, and it is the second branch of the said amusement park after its first branch in Tagaytay.

=== Drive-in cinema ===
Upon the closure of cinemas since March 2020 amidst the COVID-19 pandemic in the Philippines, SM Cinema opened up a drive-in-cinema dubbed as SM Cinema: Movies at Sundown on July 31, 2020, located at the mall's amphitheater, with the ticket prices starting at 400 pesos, and must be purchased through SM Tickets website. The first film to be shown in this drive-in-cinema is the biggest South Korean horror film, Train to Busan 2: Peninsula.

== Incidents ==
- On September 20, 2011, before noontime, two minors, both male, were critically injured in a shooting incident.
- On April 22, 2019, an earthquake almost made one of the logos fall down.

Preceded by SM City Manila	10th SM Supermall; 2000	Succeeded by SM City Sucat
