= N305 highway (Philippines) =

Secondary road in the Philippines

Route 305

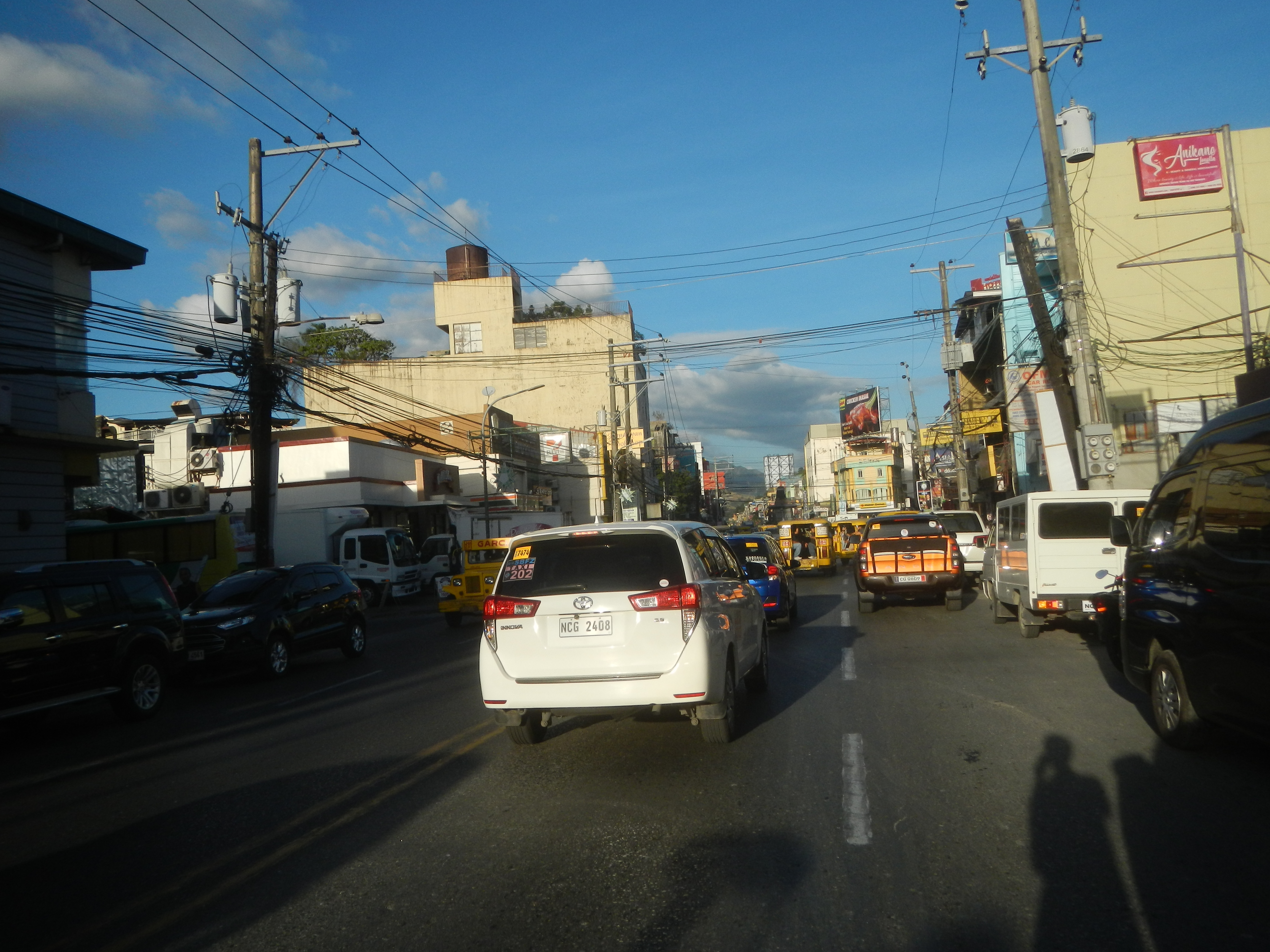
- The Rizal Avenue segment of N305 (northbound) in Olongapo. The Ulo ng Apo roundabout intersection can be seen in the background as its northern terminus.

Route information
- Maintained by the Department of Public Works and Highways
- Length: 1.7 km (1.1 mi)

Major junctions
- North end: N3 (Jose Abad Santos Avenue) / N306 (Olongapo–Bugallon Road)
- South end: Magsaysay Bridge (pedestrian walkway)

Location
- Country: Philippines
- Provinces: Zambales
- Major cities: Olongapo City

Highway system
- Roads in the Philippines; Highways; Expressways; List
← N303	→ N306

National Route 305 (N305) forms a part of the Philippine highway network. It is a secondary road that acts as a four-lane spur road that spans 1.7 kilometers (1.1 mi) and consists two major streets in Olongapo, which are Rizal Avenue and Magsaysay Drive, serving as the main road of Olongapo city center.

== Route description ==
N305 was constructed by the United States Government when the Olongapo was a Naval Reservation. U.S. Navy personnel used the route to provide access to Manila while the U.S. Naval Base Subic Bay existed in Olongapo.

=== Magsaysay Drive ===
N305 starts at the Magsaysay Bridge as its southern terminus, a pedestrian walkway that used to be a roadway for vehicles, then provided access to the Subic Bay Freeport Zone portion of the city until 2011 when SM City Olongapo Downtown was built. The route is entirely a one-way road for northbound vehicles. Magsaysay Drive ends at the Friendship Rotunda, a roundabout intersection that was built in the 1970s.

=== Rizal Avenue ===
Going further north, N305 continues the route after the Friendship Rotunda, as Rizal Avenue. the Bajac-Bajac Bridge also crosses the route. N305 terminates north at the Ulo ng Apo roundabout – intersecting with other major roads of Jose Abad Santos Avenue (N3) and Olongapo–Bugallon Road (N306).

== Maintenance ==
N305 was maintained by the City Government of Olongapo and the Department of Public Works and Highways.

=== Enforcement ===
The route was equipped with CCTV camera, traffic cones and proper traffic signage to provide safety features and guide direction for motorist. the whole route has assigned traffic personnel enforced by Office of the Traffic Management and Public Safety.

== Intersections ==
=== Rizal Avenue ===
- Sta Rita Intersection
- 26th Street West Junction
- 25th Street (OCES) West Junction
- 24th Street Intersection
- 23rd Street (City Hall) West Junction
- 22nd Street East Junction
- Rizal Triangle Junction
- 20th Street Intersection
- Ulo ng Apo Rotunda

=== Rizal Avenue Extension ===
- Hospital Road - Anonas Street Intersection (known as SM City Olongapo Central Intersection)
- 16th Street Intersection
- 14th Street (Jackson) Intersection
- 12th Street Intersection
- 11th Street West Junction
- 9th Street (Wesley) Intersection
- Friendship Rotunda

=== Magsaysay Drive (North to South) ===
- Fendler Street Intersection
- Gallagher Street East Junction
- Hansen - 3rd Street Intersection (Police Station 3)
- Gordon Avenue - 1st Street Intersection (Magsaysay Drive Main Crossing)
- Main Gate - Columban Junction (end of Magsaysay Drive)
