= Olongapo–Bugallon Road =

Major highway in Pangasinan and Zambales

Olongapo–Bugallon Road
- Pangasinan–Zambales Highway
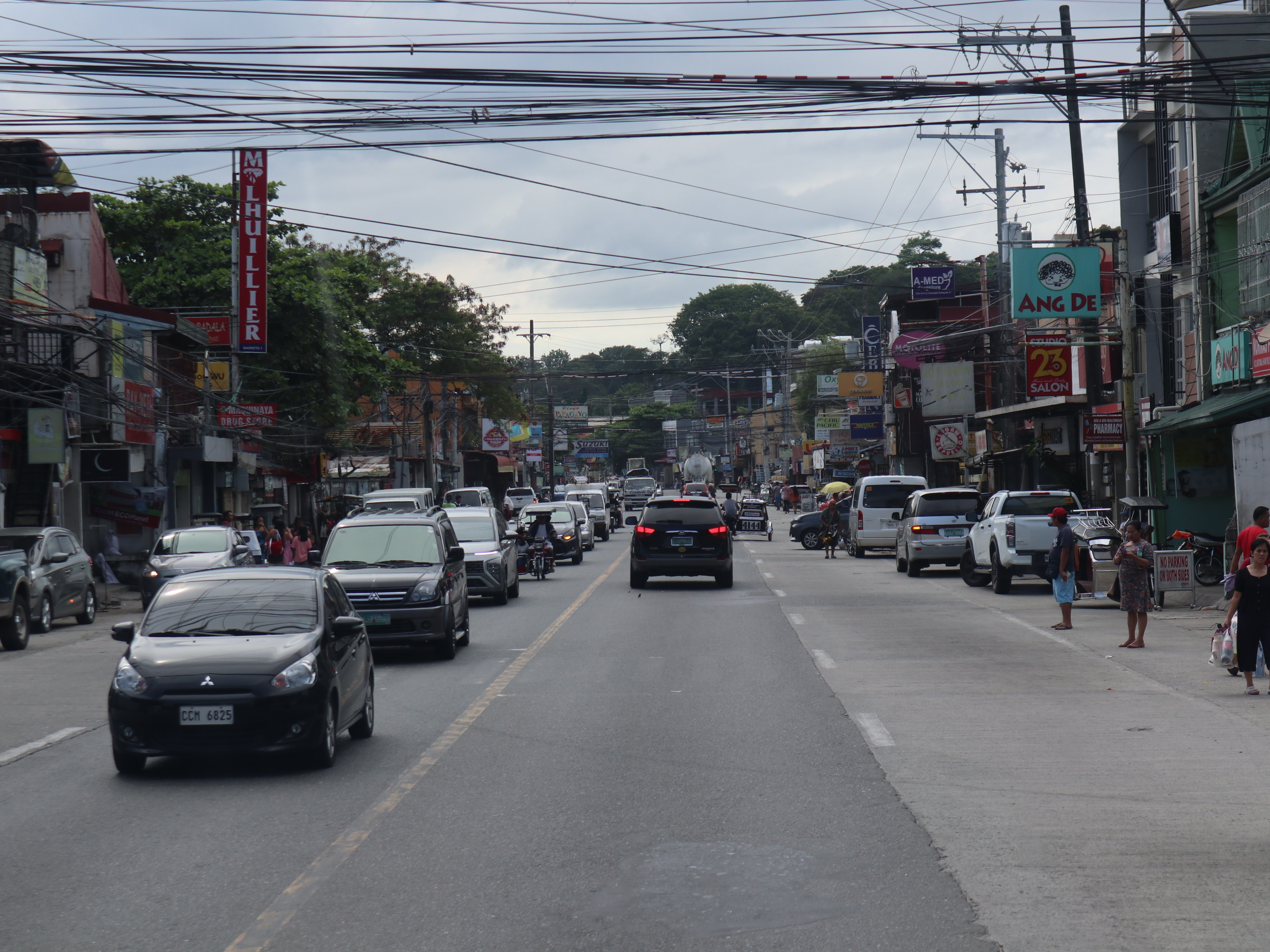
- Section of the Olongapo–Bugallon Road at Barangay Barretto, Olongapo

Route information
- Maintained by the Department of Public Works and Highways; Zambales 1st and 2nd District Engineering Office; Pangasinan 1st and 2nd District Engineering Office
- Component highways: N306

Major junctions
- North end: N55 (Romulo Highway) in Bugallon, Pangasinan
- N307 (Alaminos–Bolinao Road) in Alaminos, Pangasinan; N307-1 (Alaminos–Lucap Road) in Alaminos, Pangasinan
- South end: N3 (Olongapo–Gapan Road) / N305 (Rizal Avenue) in Olongapo

Location
- Country: Philippines
- Provinces: Pangasinan, Zambales
- Major cities: Alaminos, Olongapo
- Towns: Subic, Castillejos, San Marcelino, San Narciso, San Felipe, Cabangan, Botolan, Iba, Palauig, Masinloc, Candelaria, Santa Cruz, Infanta, Dasol, Burgos, Mabini, Alaminos, Sual, Labrador, Bugallon

Highway system
- Roads in the Philippines; Highways; Expressways; List
← N305	→ N307

The Olongapo–Bugallon Road, also known as the Pangasinan–Zambales Highway, officially designated as National Route 306 (N306) of the Philippine highway network, is a secondary national road that connects the highly urbanized city of Olongapo in the province of Zambales to the municipality of Bugallon in the province of Pangasinan. Operating as the principal longitudinal transportation artery for the western coastal corridor of the island of Luzon, the highway spans approximately 140.96 kilometers within the Zambales segment alone, with the total continuous route extending further into Pangasinan for a total length of 175 kilometers. The route originates at the Ulo ng Apo Rotonda in Olongapo City, where it intersects with Jose Abad Santos Avenue (N3) and Rizal Avenue (N305), and it terminates at a junction with the Romulo Highway (N55) in Bugallon. As a continuous coastal highway, the Olongapo-Bugallon Road facilitates the movement of agricultural commodities, industrial materials, and passenger traffic between Central Luzon (Region III) and the Ilocos Region (Region I). Maintenance, rehabilitation, and network development for the infrastructure are administered by the Department of Public Works and Highways through multiple district engineering offices distributed across the two provinces.

== History ==
=== Pre-colonial Pathways and Spanish Colonial Infrastructure ===
The alignment of the current Olongapo-Bugallon Road traces its geographical origins to pre-colonial land tracks established by indigenous populations along the western coast of Luzon. During the expansion phase of the Kapampangan empire, regional trade routes were primarily developed adjacent to the Pampanga River. Because the existing road networks readily connected inland territories like Nueva Ecija, Bulacan, and Manila, the coastal provinces of Zambales and Bataan remained relatively isolated from central trade hubs. Over successive generations, local populations developed pedestrian land tracks and primitive wagon trails to navigate the rugged coastal terrain.

Following the arrival of Spanish colonial forces in the Philippines, these indigenous trails were formally developed into wider roads to support military logistics and administrative consolidation. The Spanish authorities recognized the strategic geographic value of Subic Bay and established a naval base in the area. To secure reliable overland access to this facility, the colonial government expanded the existing road networks, constructed wooden bridges over coastal rivers, and formally connected the coastal towns of Zambales to Olongapo. This early infrastructure formed the baseline orientation for the modern highway.

=== American colonial period engineering ===
During the American colonial period, significant civil engineering improvements were implemented across the Philippine road network. The United States government assumed control of the existing naval facilities, establishing the U.S. Naval Base Subic Bay in Olongapo. To connect this naval reservation with Manila and the inland Clark Air Base in Pampanga, American military engineers initiated comprehensive paving projects and replaced aging Spanish-era wooden structures with reinforced concrete bridges.

The road network in Central Luzon was systematically reorganized during this era to support motorized vehicle traffic. The segment connecting Olongapo to San Fernando was designated as Highway 7, while the road connecting Tarlac City to Bugallon was designated as Highway 13 or Route 131. The coastal route through Zambales was improved with macadam and early asphalt surfaces to handle heavier military transports and commercial vehicles, establishing the foundational alignment of the modern Olongapo-Bugallon Road.

=== World War II blockades and post-war reconstruction ===
The outbreak of World War II severely impacted the civil infrastructure of Central Luzon. The Japanese imperial forces blockaded major transportation routes, including the roads leading into Olongapo, to halt the movement and retreat of American and Philippine military units. Japanese forces subsequently bombed various sections of the highway to prevent the fortification of military bases in the region, leading to the destruction of multiple concrete bridges and paved segments.

Following the conclusion of the war, the Philippine government launched a comprehensive rehabilitation program to repair the damaged infrastructure. The entire span of the highway was repaved, new bridges were constructed to replace those destroyed during the conflict, and road shoulders were improved to meet modern engineering standards. This post-war reconstruction period solidified the Olongapo-Bugallon Road as the primary, fully paved transport corridor for the western seaboard of Luzon.

=== 1991 Mount Pinatubo Eruption and geological impacts ===
The eruption of Mount Pinatubo in 1991 caused extensive geological and infrastructural disruption across Zambales and neighboring provinces. The eruption deposited massive volumes of volcanic ash into the surrounding watersheds, which subsequent heavy monsoon rains mobilized into destructive lahar flows. While the most severe lahar burials occurred along the Jose Abad Santos Avenue in Pampanga, the river systems intersecting the Olongapo-Bugallon Road in Zambales also experienced massive sediment loading.

In the aftermath of the disaster, the Department of Public Works and Highways executed extensive rehabilitation projects. Civil engineers constructed new road alignments on elevated embankments designed to withstand future lahar events and seasonal flooding. The continuous threat of lahar and sediment transport required the complete redesign and elevation of several river crossings along the route to maintain sufficient vertical clearance over aggrading riverbeds.

=== Modern network development and asset preservation ===
In recent decades, the Department of Public Works and Highways has implemented continuous asset preservation and network development programs along the Olongapo-Bugallon Road. A primary focus has been the upgrading of the road surface from asphalt concrete overlays to Portland Cement Concrete Pavement to support the increasing axle loads of commercial freight trucks. Due to increasing traffic volumes and the expansion of regional economies, extensive road widening projects have been executed to expand the highway from two lanes to four lanes in multiple municipalities, including San Narciso, San Marcelino, Alaminos, and Sual. Between 2016 and 2020, the regional engineering offices completed the rehabilitation of over 2,438 kilometers of roads across Central Luzon, with the Olongapo-Bugallon Road serving as a primary focus for these infrastructure investments.

== Route description ==
The Olongapo-Bugallon Road traverses a diverse geographical landscape, passing through densely populated urban centers, agricultural plains, and coastal margins. The route is divided into several distinct segments based on provincial and municipal boundaries, managed by the Zambales First and Second District Engineering Offices and the Pangasinan First and Second District Engineering Offices.

=== Intersections ===
The Olongapo-Bugallon Road features several major intersections that integrate the coastal route with the broader Philippine highway network. The table below outlines the primary junctions along the corridor from south to north, detailing the intersecting routes and their regional significance.

Province	City / Municipality	Intersecting Route / Landmark	Significance and Notes
Zambales	Olongapo City	N3 (Jose Abad Santos Avenue) / N305 (Rizal Avenue)	Southern terminus located at the Ulo ng Apo Rotonda. Connects traffic to the Subic Bay Freeport Zone and the province of Bataan.
Zambales	Subic	N305 (Magsaysay Drive)	Connects via local road networks to the Subic Bay Freeport Zone and the Subic-Clark-Tarlac Expressway (SCTEX).
Zambales	Botolan	Capas-Botolan Bypass Road	An 84.47-kilometer lateral highway connecting Zambales directly to Capas, Tarlac. Reduces travel time between the provinces to approximately two hours.
Pangasinan	Alaminos City	N307 (Alaminos-Bolinao Road)	Major junction providing access to the coastal municipalities of Bani, Agno, and Bolinao.
Pangasinan	Alaminos City	Alaminos-Bani Bypass Road / Alaminos-Lucap Road	A 1.861-kilometer bypass that provides direct access to the Hundred Islands National Park and diverts through-traffic from the city center.
Pangasinan	Bugallon	N55 (Romulo Highway)	Northern and eastern terminus. Connects traffic toward Lingayen (capital of Pangasinan) to the north, and Mangatarem, Camiling, and Tarlac City to the south.

=== Olongapo City and Subic Bay segment ===
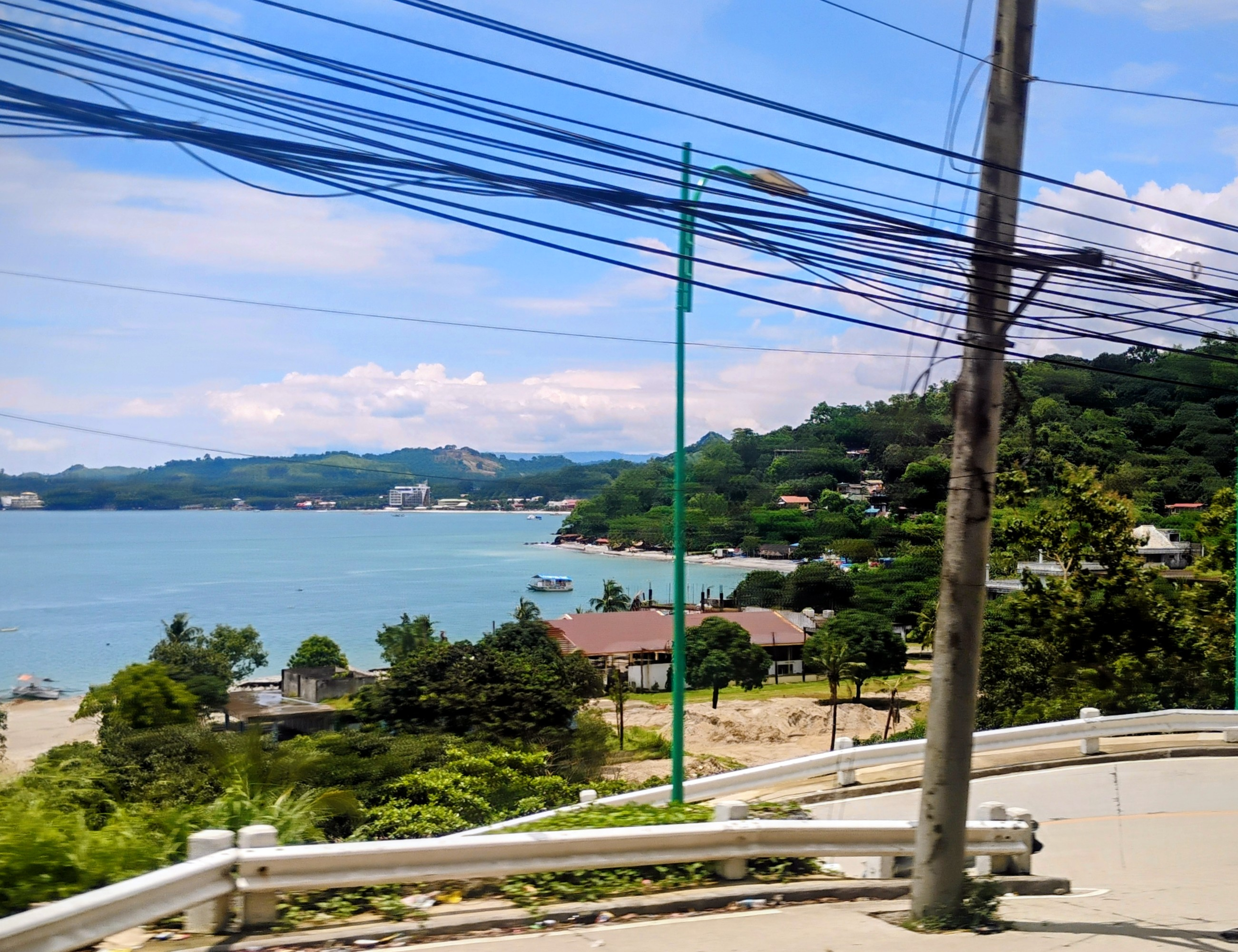
Zig-zag segment of the road facing Subic Bay

The highway officially begins in Olongapo City at the Ulo ng Apo Rotonda, a major roundabout intersection. At this junction, the route connects with Jose Abad Santos Avenue (National Route 3), a 118-kilometer highway that provides access to the provinces of Bataan, Pampanga, and Nueva Ecija. The road also intersects with Rizal Avenue (National Route 305), a 1.7-kilometer secondary spur road that serves as the main thoroughfare for the Olongapo city proper and connects to the Magsaysay Bridge and the Subic Bay Freeport Zone.

From the Ulo ng Apo Rotonda, the Olongapo-Bugallon Road proceeds northward through the coastal barangays of Olongapo, including Kalaklan and Barretto. The highway maintains a coastal alignment, offering proximity to Subic Bay before crossing the municipal boundary into the town of Subic. Within Subic, the road passes through the barangays of Calapacuan, Calapandayan, Ilwas, and Mangan Vaca. The road functions as the primary commercial corridor for the municipality, passing the Subic Municipal Hall and various local government facilities. The Department of Public Works and Highways has executed specific drainage and rehabilitation projects in this segment, notably between station limits K0136+775 to K0137+486.

=== Southern Zambales ===
Leaving the immediate vicinity of Subic Bay, the highway shifts slightly inland as it enters the municipality of Castillejos. The terrain transitions from coastal margins to agricultural plains framed by the Zambales mountain range to the east. The road continues northward into the municipality of San Marcelino, where motorists pass through the San Marcelino arch. In this section, the Department of Public Works and Highways has executed multiple asset preservation projects. Detailed engineering designs indicate road reconstructions and slip repairs specifically between kilometer markers K0150+505 to K0151+000, and K0152+965 to K0154+897. The route then enters the municipality of San Antonio before curving back toward the coastline in San Narciso and San Felipe. The highway in San Narciso has undergone significant widening to accommodate increased traffic flow. Network development programs mandate the widening of secondary roads specifically between kilometer markers K0158+640 to K0161+000, and K0163+097 to K0164+093, managed by the Zambales First District Engineering Office. The agricultural zones in this segment are highly dependent on the highway for the transport of local produce to markets in Olongapo and Metro Manila.

=== Central Zambales ===
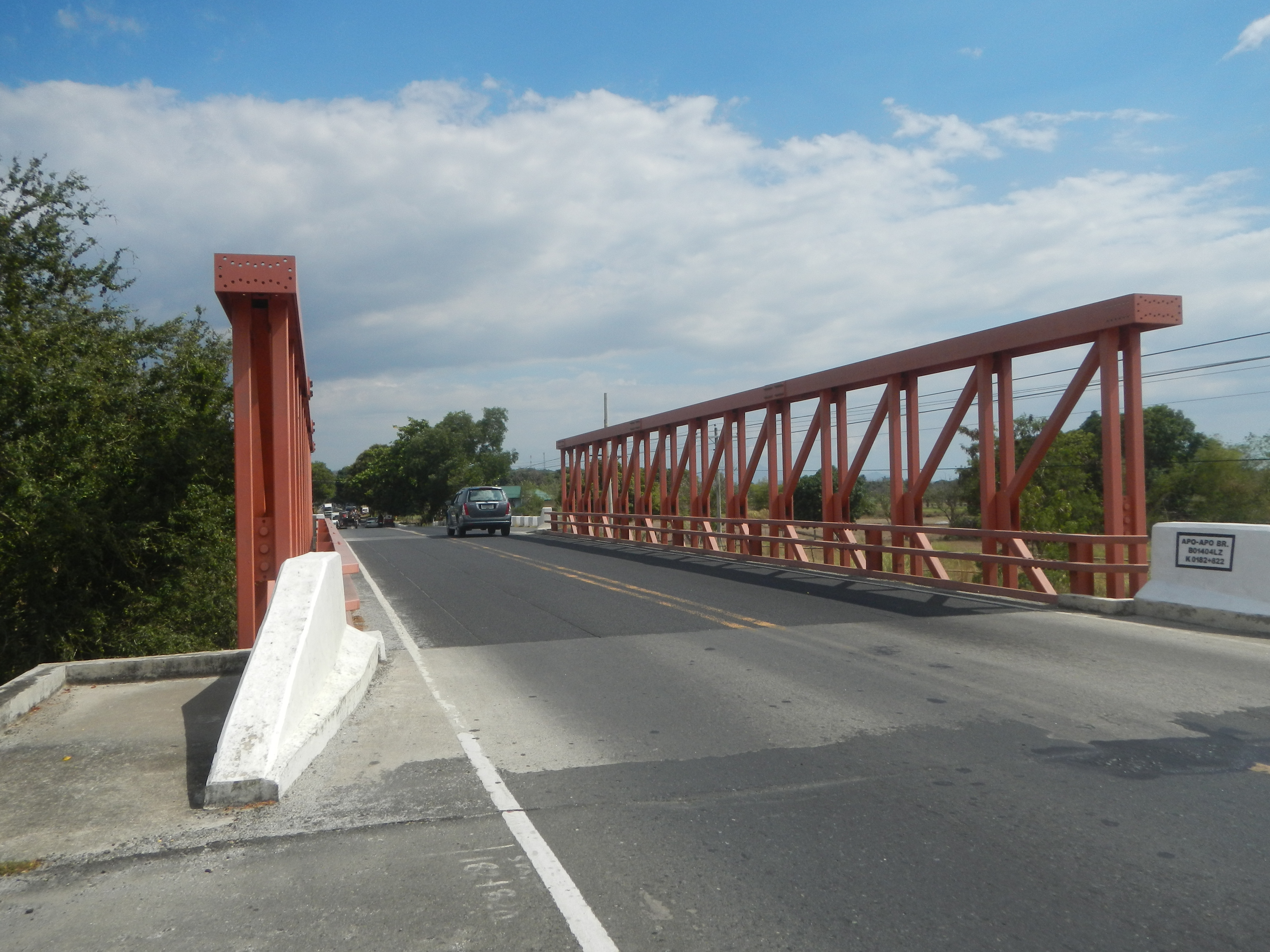
Apo-apo bridge in Cabangan, Zambales

Progressing north, the highway enters the municipality of Cabangan, an area characterized by a narrow coastal plain bordered by the West Philippine Sea and inland mountains. The route crosses several waterways in this area. Structural strengthening programs have been applied to the Apo-Apo Bridge, Sto. Nino Bridge, and Anonang Bridge in Cabangan to ensure the infrastructure can support heavy freight. The road continues into the municipality of Botolan. Botolan serves as a critical junction for the Capas–Botolan Bypass Road, an 84.47-kilometer infrastructure project designed to provide a direct east-to-west lateral link between the province of Tarlac and Zambales. This bypass road, intersecting the Olongapo-Bugallon Road, reduces travel time between the two provinces from five hours to approximately two hours, completely bypassing the traditional route through Pangasinan or the Subic-Clark-Tarlac Expressway. The project requires the construction of 15 new bridges with an accumulated length of 2,715 linear meters. Immediately north of Botolan is the municipality of Iba, the provincial capital of Zambales. The highway passes through the Iba town proper, functioning as the main administrative corridor and providing direct access to the Zambales Provincial Capitol building.

=== Northern Zambales ===
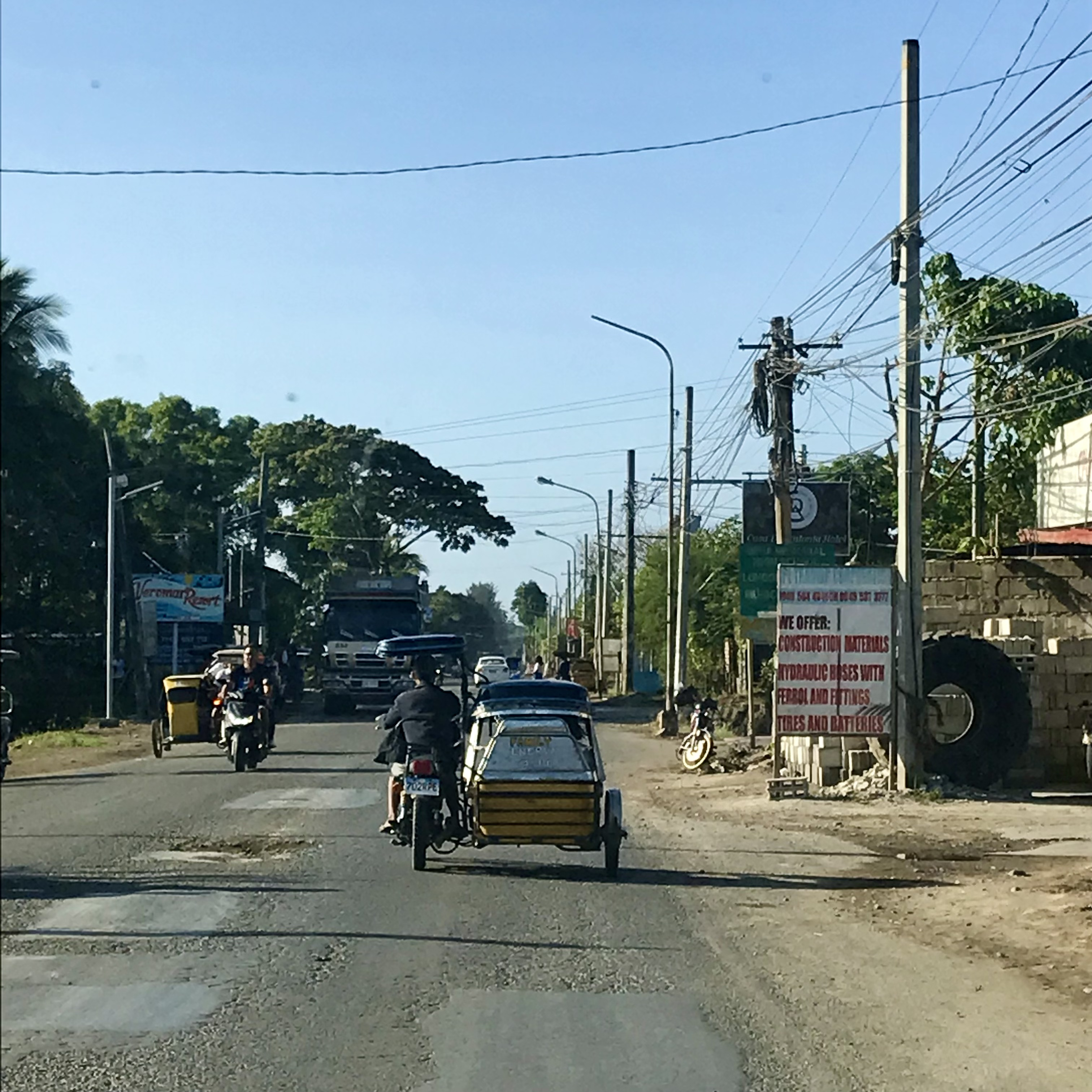
Southbound traffic on the road in Santa Cruz, Zambales

Beyond Iba, the highway serves the northern municipalities of Palauig, Masinloc, Candelaria, and Santa Cruz. This segment supports a mix of agricultural operations and heavy industry. In Masinloc, the road requires substantial slope protection due to the local topography. The Department of Public Works and Highways implemented a major slope protection project in the Baloganon section of Masinloc, utilizing steel sheet piles and structured wall pipes to prevent landslides and manage water runoff. Additional bridge infrastructure in Masinloc, including the San Lorenzo Bridge and Rosario Bridge, has undergone mandatory retrofitting. The road crosses the Lawis Bridge 1 and Uacon Bridge in Candelaria before entering Santa Cruz, the northernmost municipality of Zambales. Santa Cruz functions as a transition zone between the economic spheres of Zambales and Pangasinan. The highway in Santa Cruz has been subject to continuous road widening efforts, including the installation of 300-millimeter-thick Portland Cement Concrete Pavement between station limits K0262+000 and K0263+000 to handle heavy commercial trucks operating in the area.

=== Western Pangasinan ===
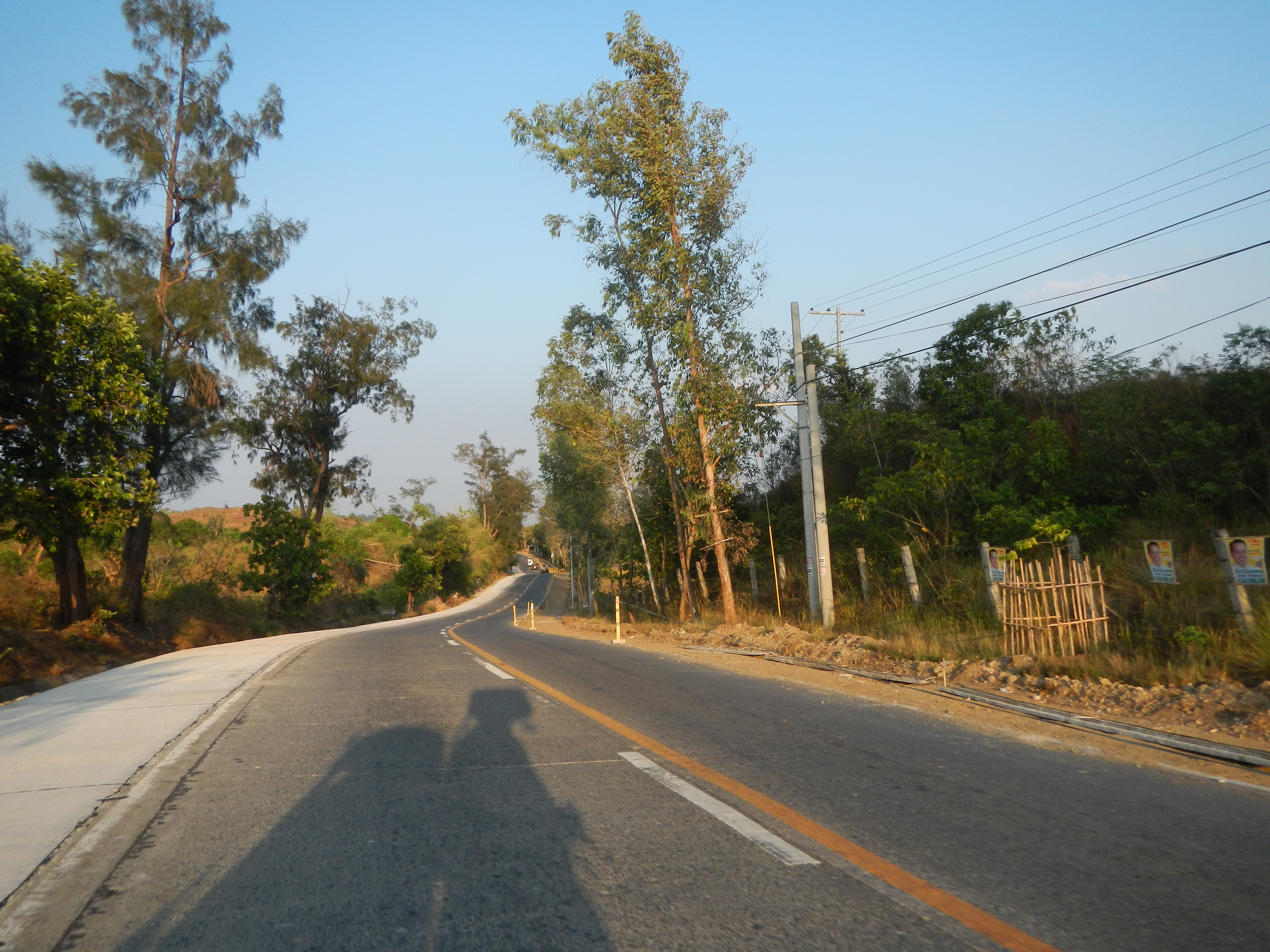
Several agoho trees appear along the Pangasinan segment of the road

The Olongapo-Bugallon Road crosses the provincial boundary and enters the Ilocos Region (Region I) in the municipality of Infanta, Pangasinan. Preventative maintenance and asphalt overlay projects have been conducted in Infanta from station K0268+(-815) to K0282+038, covering a length of 8.352 lane kilometers.

The highway proceeds northward through Dasol. Road widening projects in the Barangay Hermosa section of Dasol incorporate 802 linear meters of lined drainage canals to protect the pavement from coastal inundation.

The route continues through the municipalities of Burgos and Mabini before entering Alaminos City, a major urban center and tourism hub in western Pangasinan. Alaminos is the gateway to the Hundred Islands National Park. To manage the heavy traffic volumes associated with tourism and local commerce, the Department of Public Works and Highways constructed the 1.861-kilometer Alaminos-Bani Bypass Road. This bypass diverts through traffic away from the congested city center, linking the Olongapo-Bugallon Road directly to the Alaminos-Bolinao Road (N307). The DPWH also allocated 48.01 million pesos from the Special Road Fund for the installation of solar LED street lights along the Alaminos City segment (K0317+170 to K0320+661) to improve nighttime visibility.

=== Eastern Terminus Segment ===
From Alaminos City, the highway turns eastward, following the contours of the Lingayen Gulf coast through the municipality of Sual. Sual is home to the Sual Coal-Fired Power Plant, a 1,200-megawatt facility that represents a major energy asset for the Luzon grid. The road infrastructure in Sual, specifically along the Road segment in Barangay Caoayan, has been widened from two lanes to four lanes over a 2.1-kilometer stretch. This 39.2-million-peso improvement aims to facilitate the movement of industrial transport and agricultural goods toward the commercial centers. The route proceeds through the municipality of Labrador before reaching its northern and eastern terminus in the municipality of Bugallon. In Bugallon, the Olongapo-Bugallon Road intersects with the Romulo Highway (National Route 55), a 77.2-kilometer major highway that connects Lingayen, Pangasinan to Tarlac City. This junction serves as a primary distribution point for traffic moving into the central plains of Pangasinan or heading south toward Metro Manila via Tarlac.

== Structural and Engineering Specifications ==
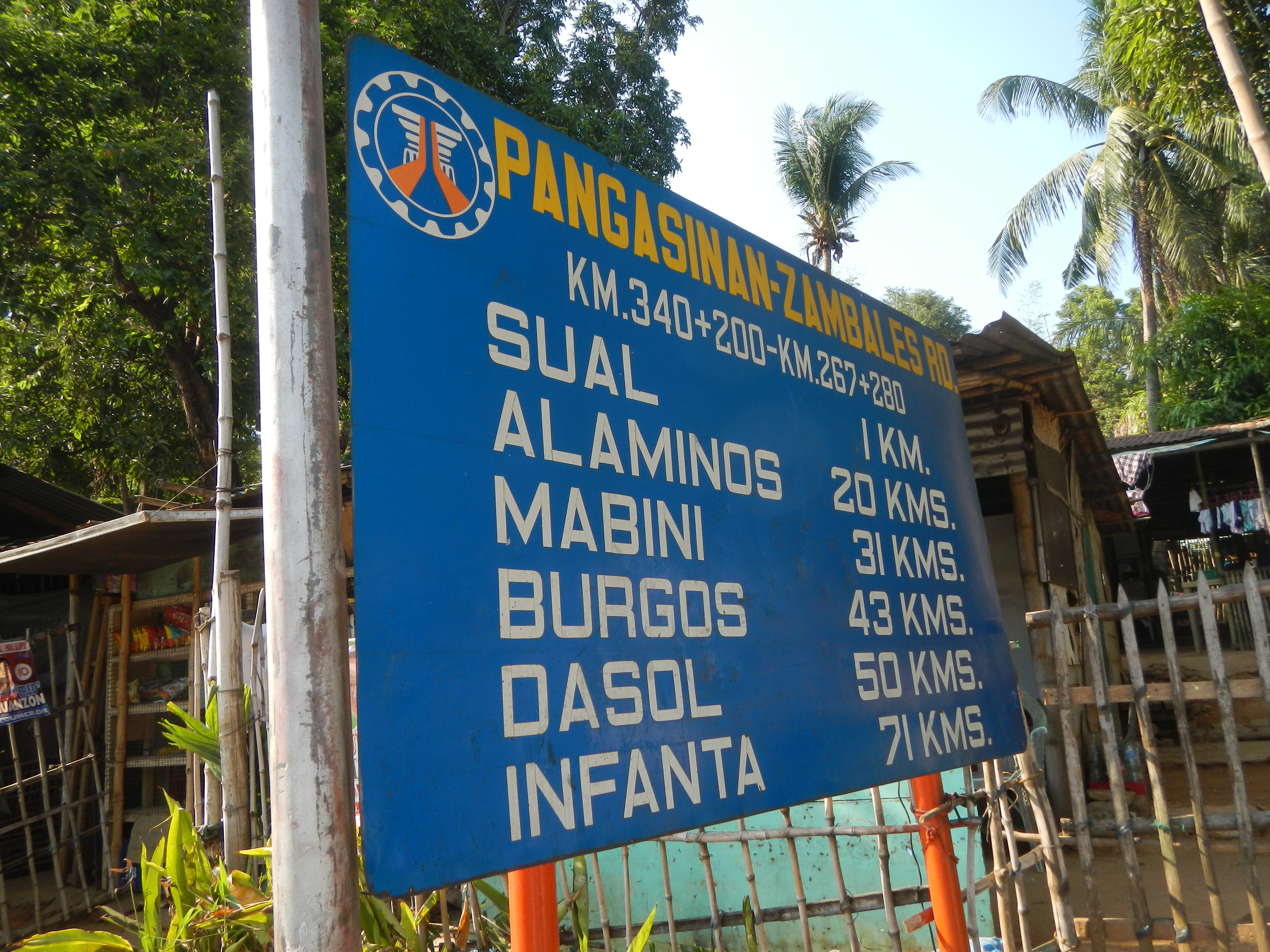
Directional signage along the road

The continuous modernization of the Olongapo-Bugallon Road involves specific engineering standards dictated by the Department of Public Works and Highways. The highway predominantly utilizes a combination of asphalt concrete overlays and Portland Cement Concrete Pavement depending on the subgrade conditions and projected traffic loads.

=== Pavement and Roadbed Upgrades ===
For sections undergoing preventive maintenance, engineers typically apply a 50-millimeter to 100-millimeter-thick asphalt concrete overlay onto the existing pavement. In areas subjected to road widening or total reconstruction, the structural requirements are significantly higher. Reconstruction contracts specify the excavation of the existing subgrade and the laying of a 200-millimeter-thick aggregate subbase course. The primary surface course consists of unreinforced Portland Cement Concrete Pavement poured to a thickness ranging from 230 millimeters to 300 millimeters, designed to cure over a period of 7 to 14 days.

Road widening projects aim to increase the carriageway capacity by adding 3.35-meter-wide lanes on either side of the existing road, supplemented by 1.50-meter-wide shoulders. These dimensions align with national standards for primary and secondary roads to accommodate standard commercial truck widths safely. Projects executed in the Pangasinan First District Engineering Office frequently incorporate extensive lined concrete canals running parallel to the new pavement to manage surface runoff.

=== Bridge Infrastructure and Retrofitting Programs ===
The highway features dozens of permanent bridges that span the rivers and coastal estuaries of Zambales and Pangasinan. Due to the high seismic activity in the Philippines and the increasing weight of commercial transport, the Department of Public Works and Highways initiated a comprehensive cluster program to retrofit and strengthen these structures. Specific retrofitting methodologies include the application of carbon fiber sheet and plate bonding to the bridge spans, which significantly increases the tensile strength of the concrete elements without adding substantial dead weight to the superstructure. Engineers also perform epoxy injection procedures to seal and repair structural cracks on the bridge deck slabs. Damaged concrete is patched, and bridge seats are extended to prevent the girders from unseating during severe seismic events. Finally, protective coating systems are applied to shield the reinforced concrete from the corrosive coastal environment.

=== Slope Protection and Drainage Systems ===
The western alignment of the highway makes it susceptible to landslides, rockfalls, and slope collapse, particularly during the monsoon season. Asset preservation programs frequently incorporate extensive slope protection measures. In areas like the Baloganon section of Masinloc and specific segments in Olongapo City (K0132+910 to K0133+185), engineers install Type III steel sheet pile slope protection featuring vertical walls measuring 0.2 meters thick and 4 meters in height.

To manage surface water and prevent the saturation of the road subbase, comprehensive drainage networks are integrated into the highway design. Modern specifications require the installation of High-Density Polyethylene (HDPE) structured wall pipes with diameters reaching 1200 millimeters. These systems include manhole access points spaced every 10 meters to facilitate maintenance, and are integrated with concrete sidewalks, curbs, and gutters. Concrete box culverts, often measuring 1.25 meters by 1.25 meters, are also constructed at minor stream crossings to ensure uninterrupted water flow beneath the highway.

== Environmental and Geohazard Considerations ==
The geographical positioning of the Olongapo-Bugallon Road exposes the infrastructure to a variety of environmental hazards. The western coast of Luzon is a primary impact zone for typhoons entering the Philippine Area of Responsibility from the West Philippine Sea.

=== Vulnerability to Flooding and Typhoons ===
The highway's proximity to sea level and its intersection with numerous river deltas make it highly susceptible to flooding. Heavy precipitation associated with the southwest monsoon, exacerbated by severe weather systems, frequently disrupts transportation. In July 2023, Severe Tropical Storm Falcon (international name: Khanun) intensified monsoon rains, triggering widespread flooding across Zambales.

Floodwaters submerged various segments of the Olongapo-Bugallon Road in the municipality of Subic and Olongapo City, with water depths reaching up to 14 inches, rendering the highway impassable to light vehicles. Similar flooding was recorded in the barangays of Mataain, Calapandayan, Mangan Vaca, and Pamatawan in Subic, as well as San Nicolas in Castillejos. The recurring nature of these flood events necessitates the continuous elevation of road grades and the expansion of drainage outfalls by the Department of Public Works and Highways.

=== Integration with Major Energy Infrastructure ===
The eastern terminus of the highway in Bugallon, Pangasinan, is situated near significant energy development zones. The proposed Bugallon Solar Power Project, a 650.1-megawatt capacity solar energy facility covering 544.23 hectares, relies heavily on the regional road network for its construction and operation phases.

The environmental impact assessment for the solar facility identified the Olongapo-Bugallon Road and the intersecting Romulo Highway as the primary logistical arteries for the transportation of construction materials and the projected 2,529 construction workers required for the project. The capacity of the highway to absorb the additional heavy equipment traffic associated with the construction of 200-megawatt-hour energy storage systems and monocrystalline bifacial photovoltaic panels underscores the industrial importance of the route.

== Economic and Regional Implications ==
The Olongapo-Bugallon Road functions as a critical economic catalyst for the coastal municipalities of the Ilocos Region and Central Luzon.

=== Agricultural and Aquaculture Logistics ===
Zambales is a major producer of agricultural goods, notably mangoes, which are harvested abundantly between January and April. The highway provides the necessary farm-to-market linkage, allowing agricultural producers to transport perishable goods rapidly to major consumption centers in Metro Manila and the export processing zones in Subic Bay. In Pangasinan, the road supports the aquaculture and salt harvesting industries based in Dasol and neighboring coastal towns. The widening of bridges, such as the Casolming Bridge, was explicitly justified by the Department of Public Works and Highways as a necessary intervention to facilitate safer access for large trucks, thereby improving the delivery efficiency of agricultural products.

=== Tourism Accessibility ===
The highway directly supports the tourism sector by providing the only continuous coastal access to numerous destinations along the West Philippine Sea. In Zambales, the road facilitates travel to surf resorts in San Narciso, the island-hopping launching points in San Antonio, and the trekking access points for Mount Tapulao in Palauig. In Pangasinan, the road is the primary vector for tourists traveling to the Hundred Islands National Park in Alaminos City, the white sand beaches of Bolinao, and the coastal attractions of Sual and Dasol. The construction of bypass roads in Alaminos specifically addresses the traffic bottlenecks caused by the convergence of commercial freight and tourism-related transport.

=== Sports Competitions ===
Organizers of cycling competitions (such as Tour of Luzon and Ronda Pilipinas) include this highway as a racing stage in some editions. It presents cyclists with flat stretches in Pangasinan and varying gradients as it passes through the municipalities of Zambales. This combination of topographies requires riders to manage different physical demands within a single day of racing.
