= Olongapo Spanish gate =

Historic site in Zambales, Philippines

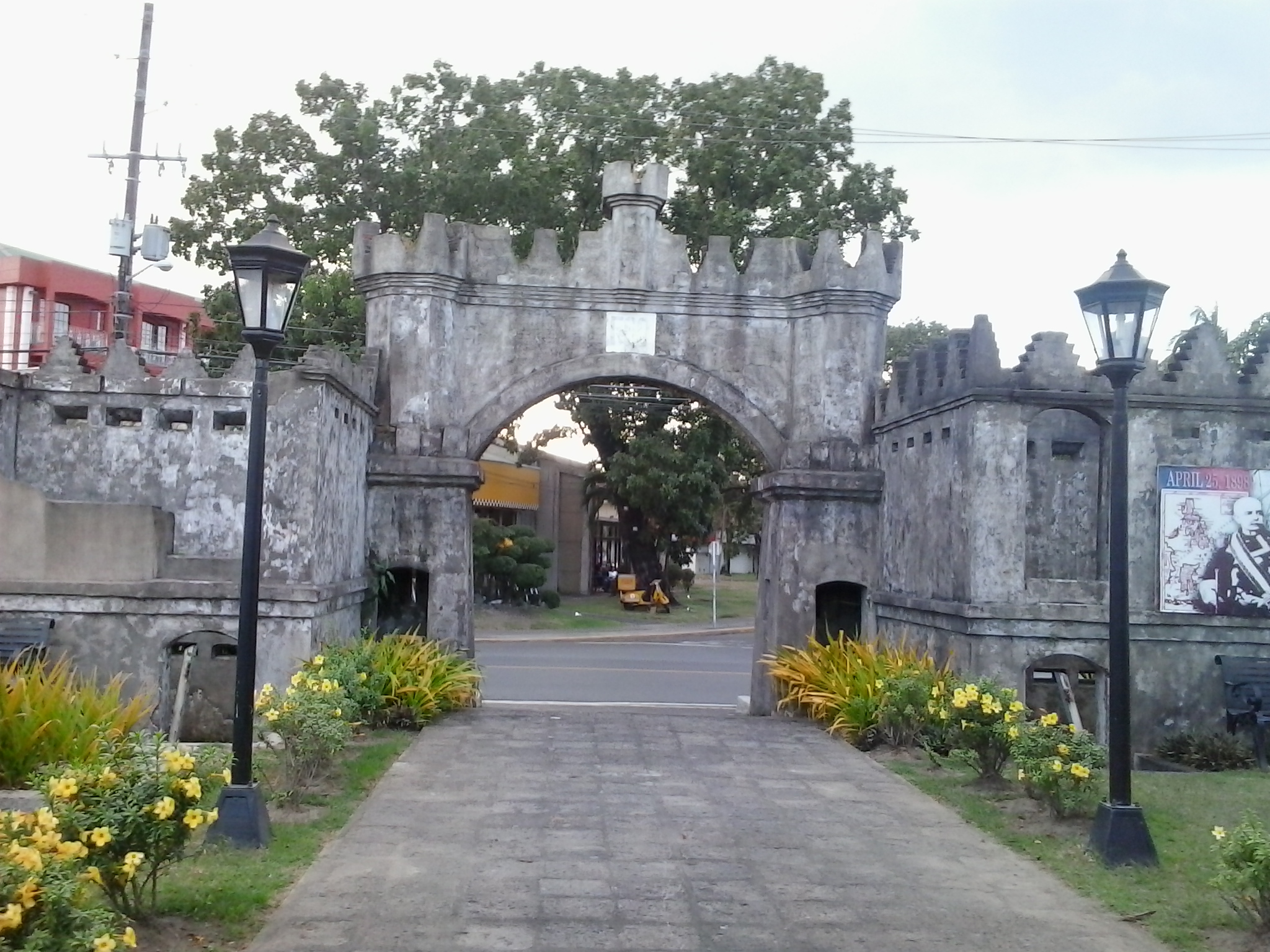
View from inside of Subic Spanish Gate

The Olongapo Spanish Gate is a historic gate located at the corner of Dewey Avenue and Samson Road in Barangay New Kalalake, Olongapo, Philippines. It was built in 1885 after the Spanish Navy authorized the construction of the Arsenal de Olongapo, following a royal decree issued by King Alfonso XII in 1884 declaring Subic Bay a naval port.

The gate served as the western entrance to the arsenal and faced the Spanish-era settlement of Olongapo. It was connected by a high wall of locally quarried stone to the arsenal's southern gate, which faced the waterfront.

In addition to serving as the principal entrance to the naval station, the gate was also used as a jail during both the Spanish and American colonial periods.

On November 26, 2013, the National Historical Commission of the Philippines (NHCP) declared the Olongapo Spanish Gate a historical landmark. The NHCP also installed a historical marker on the gate bearing the title Himpilang Pandagat ng Look ng Subic ("Naval Station of Subic Bay").

== Gallery ==
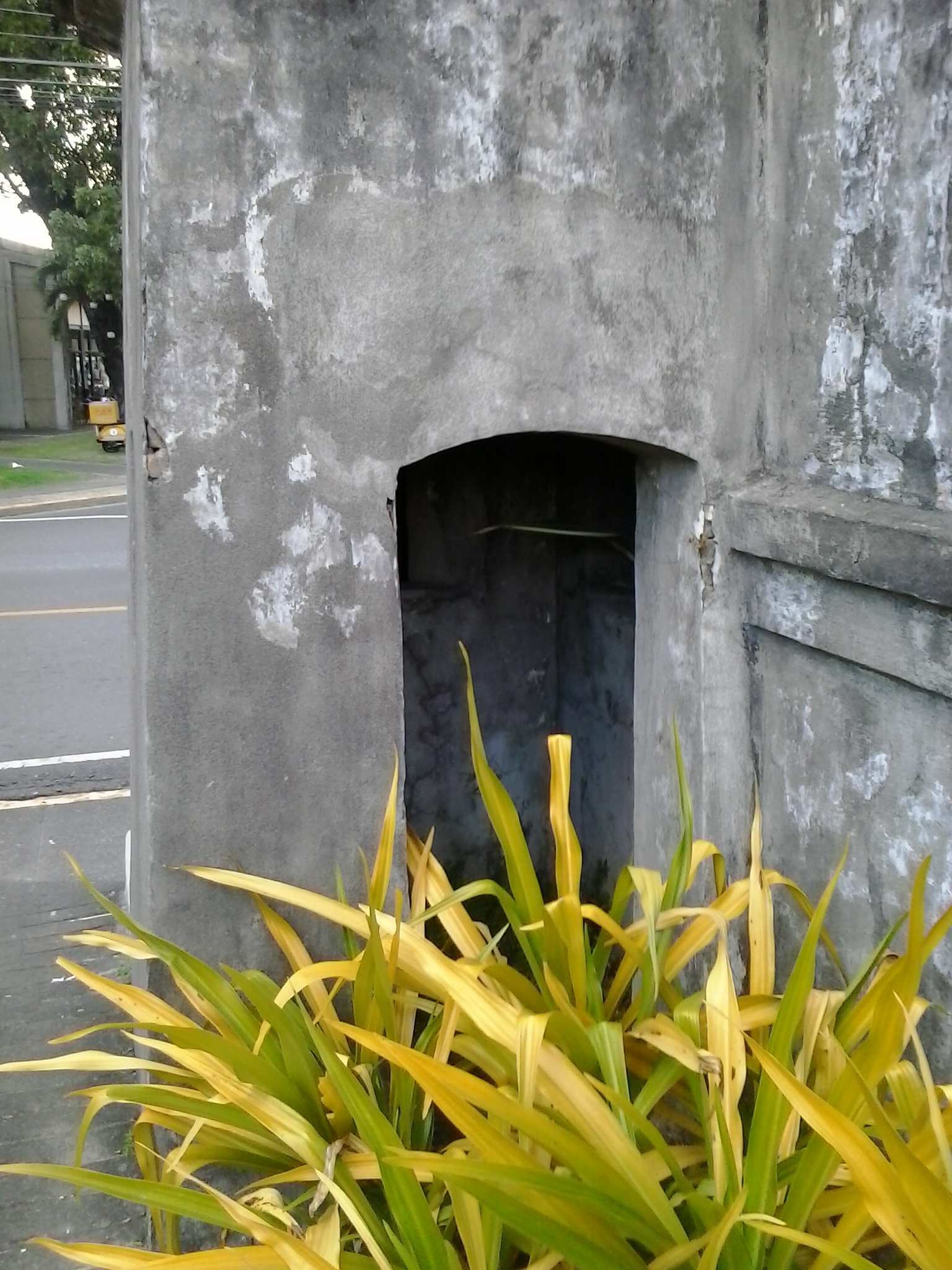
Guardhouse entrance

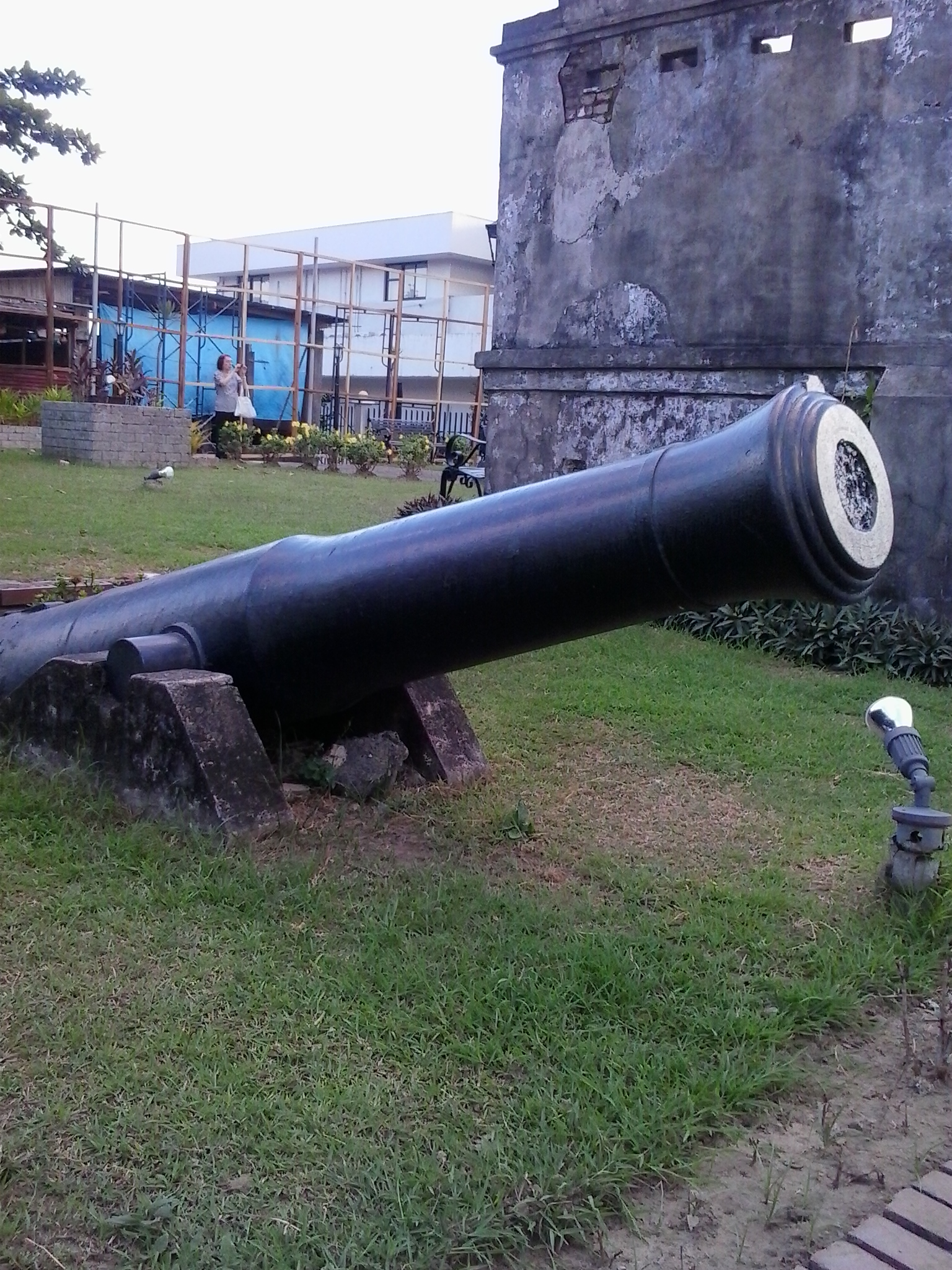
Cannon beside Spanish gate

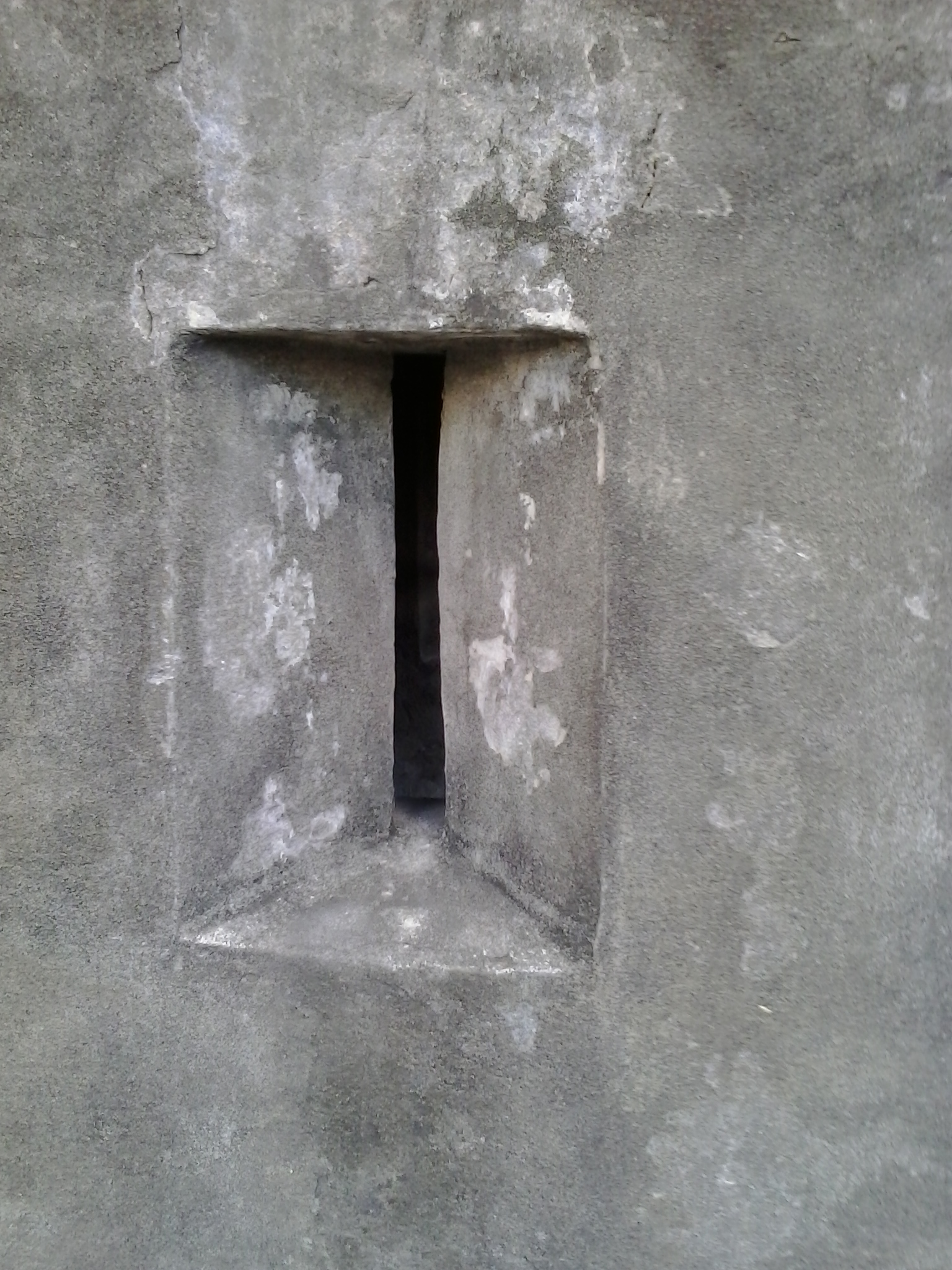
Guardhouse window

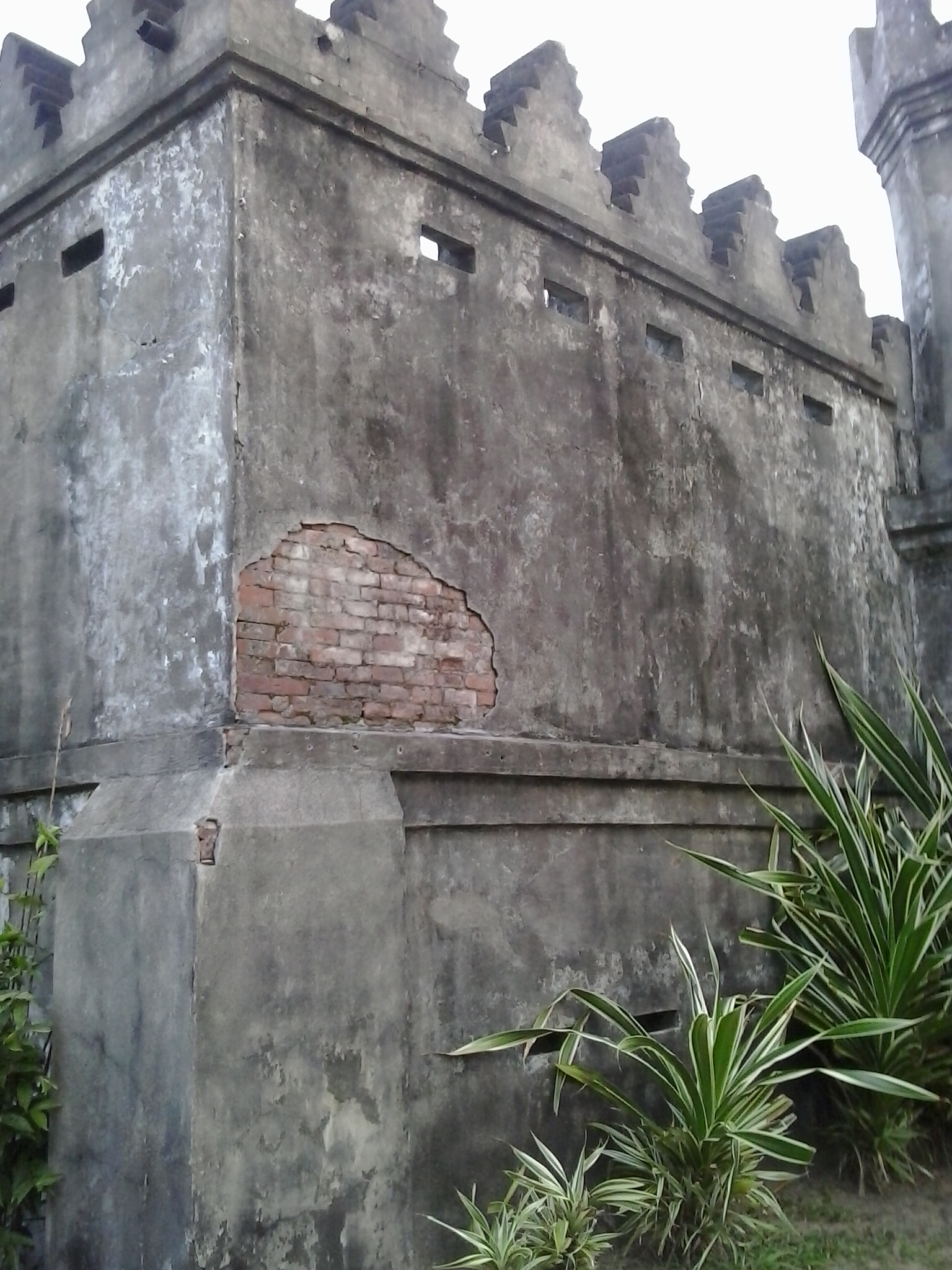
Spanish gate old wall

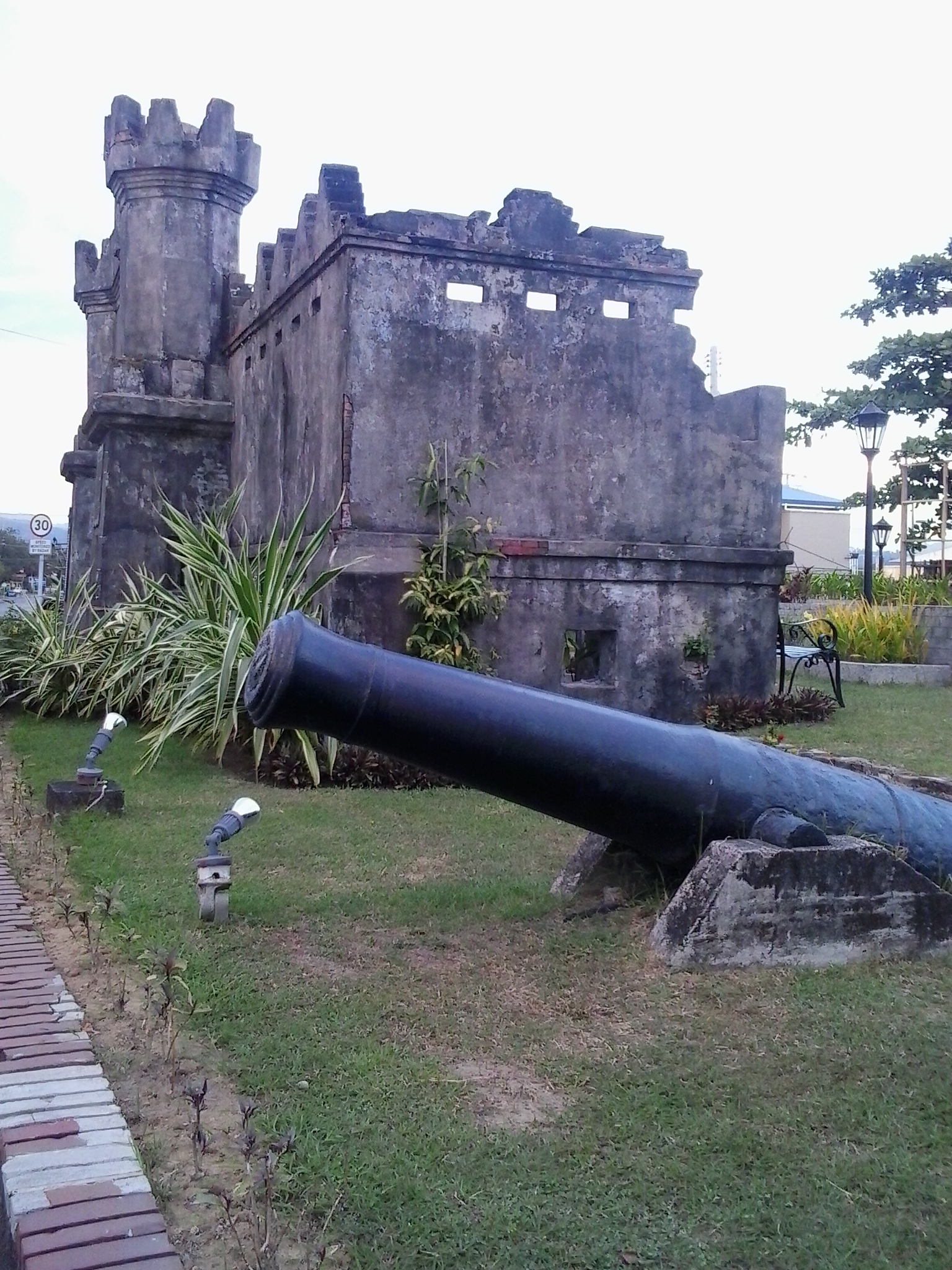
Side view of Spanish Gate 1

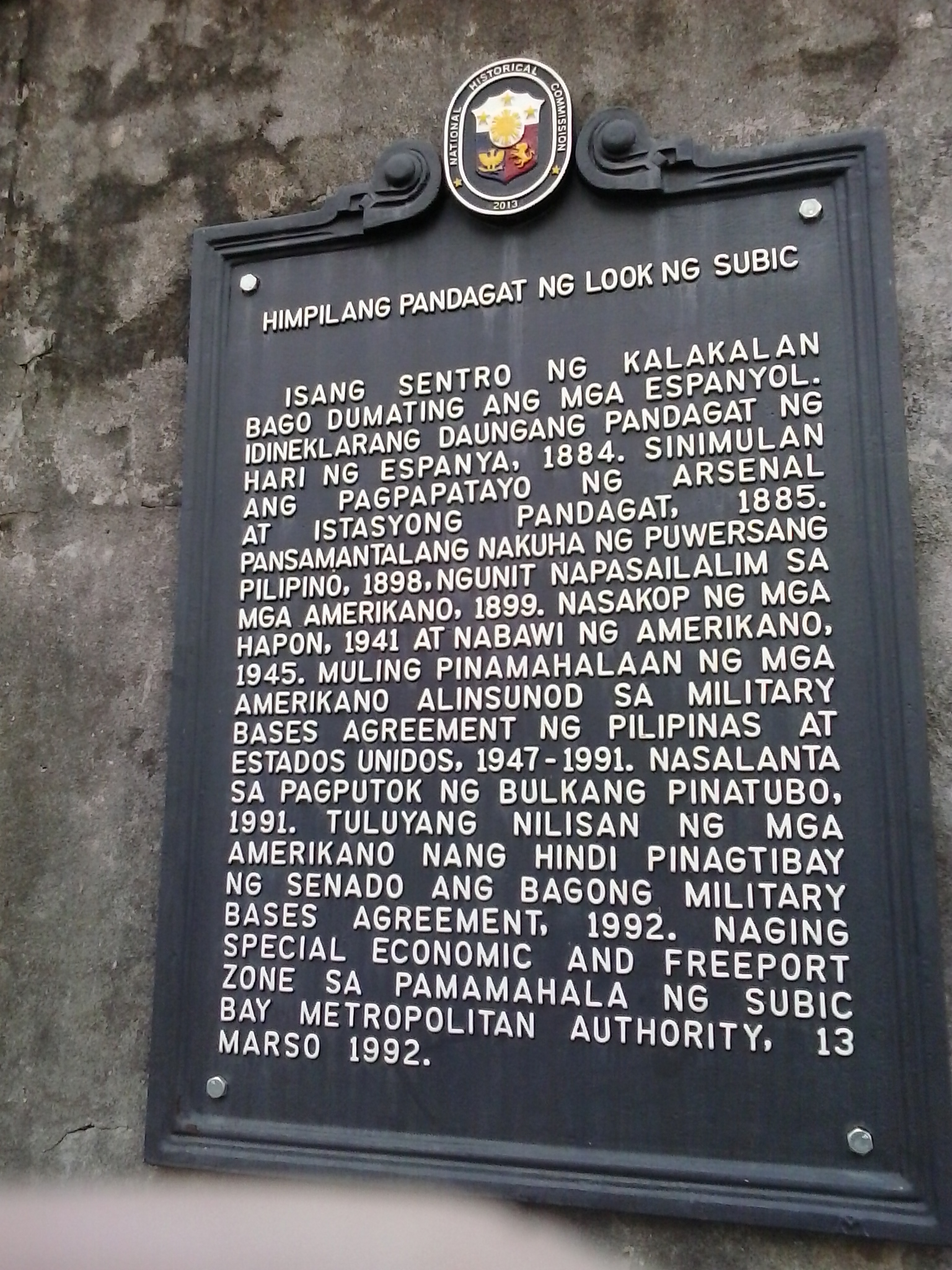
Spanish gate marker 1

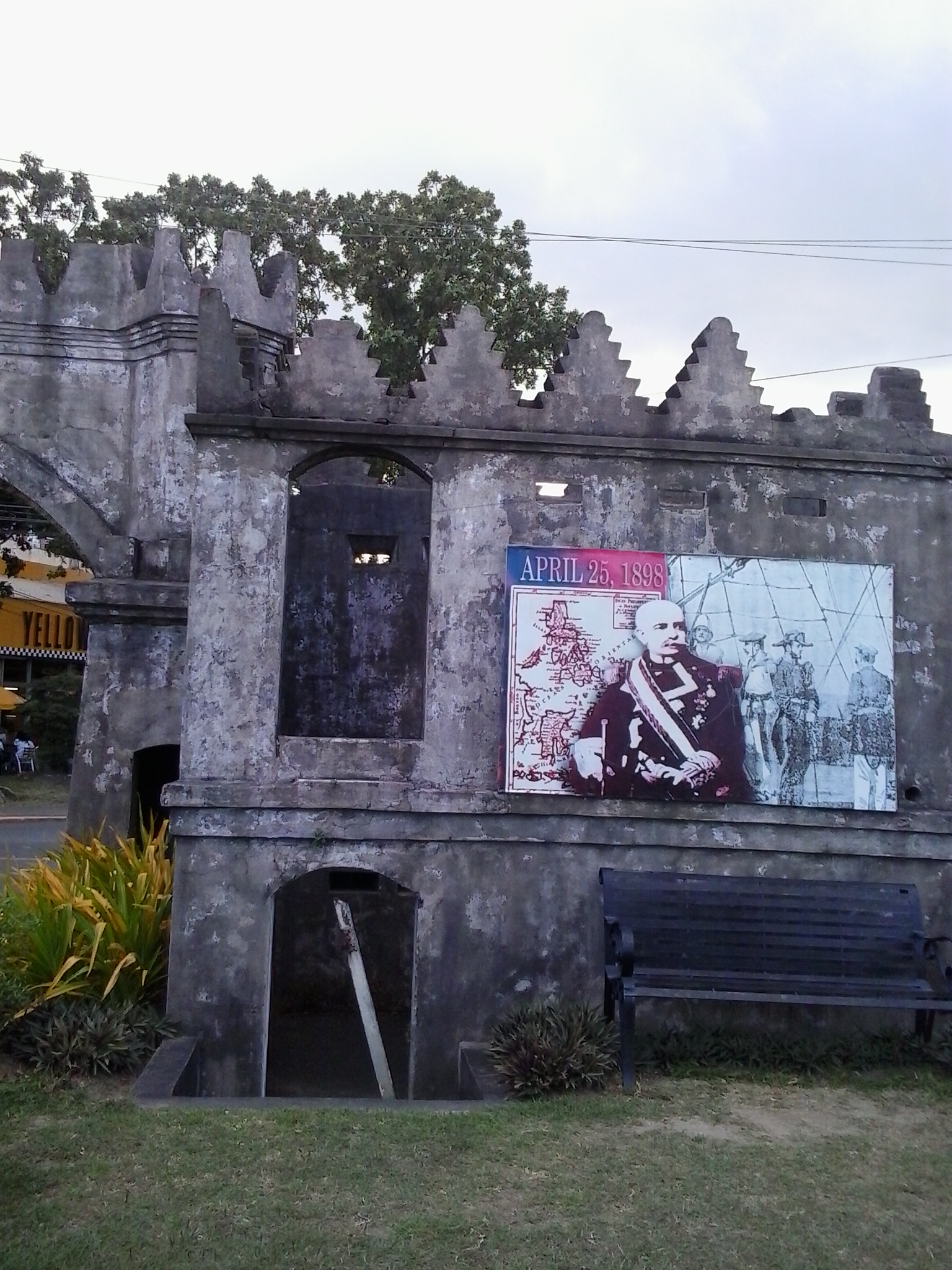
Spanish gate marker 2
