= Ermita =

District of Manila, Metro Manila, Philippines

Coordinates: 14.583°N 120.983°E

- District of Manila
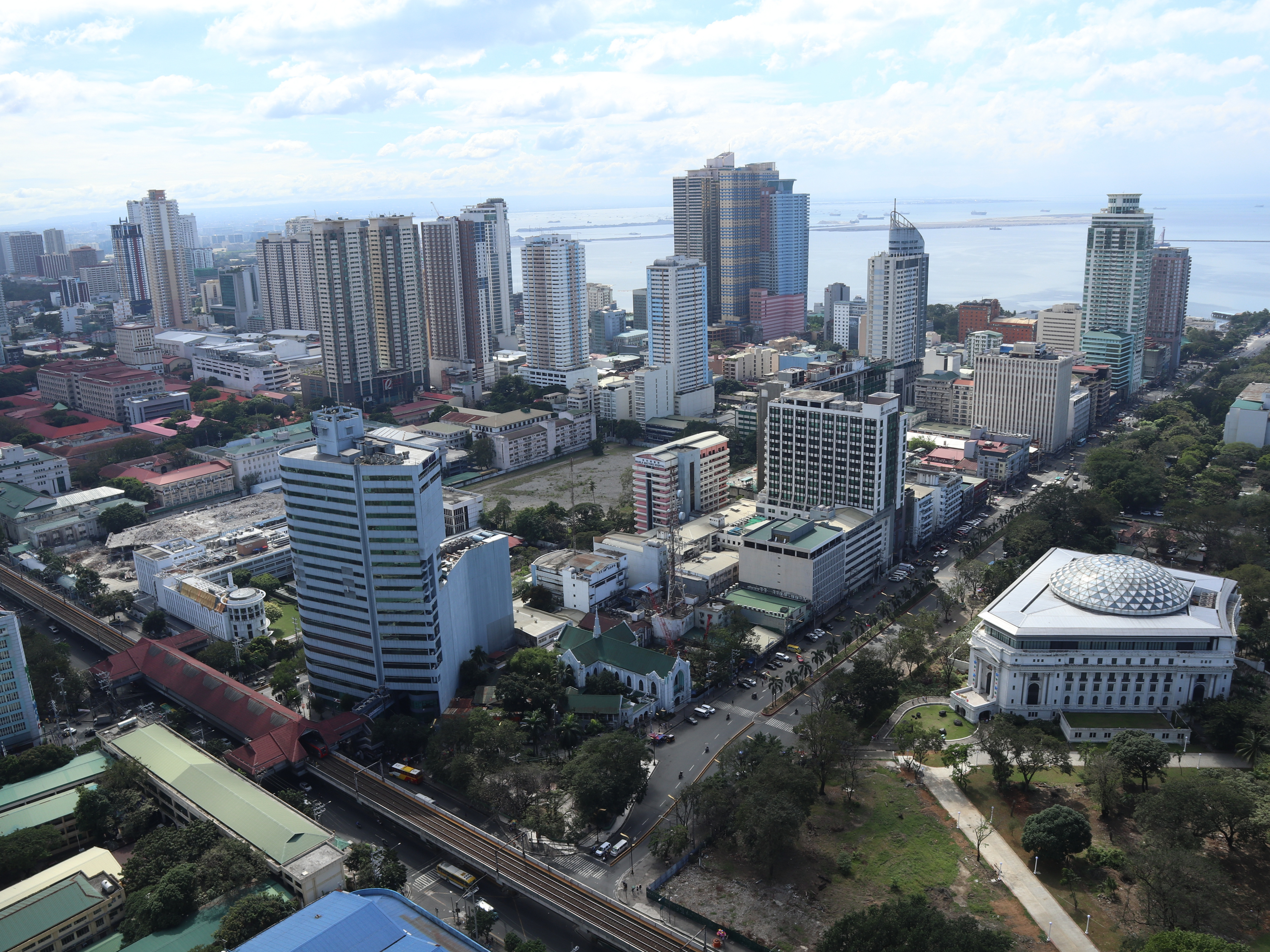
- The skyline of Ermita with the National Museum of Natural History in the foreground

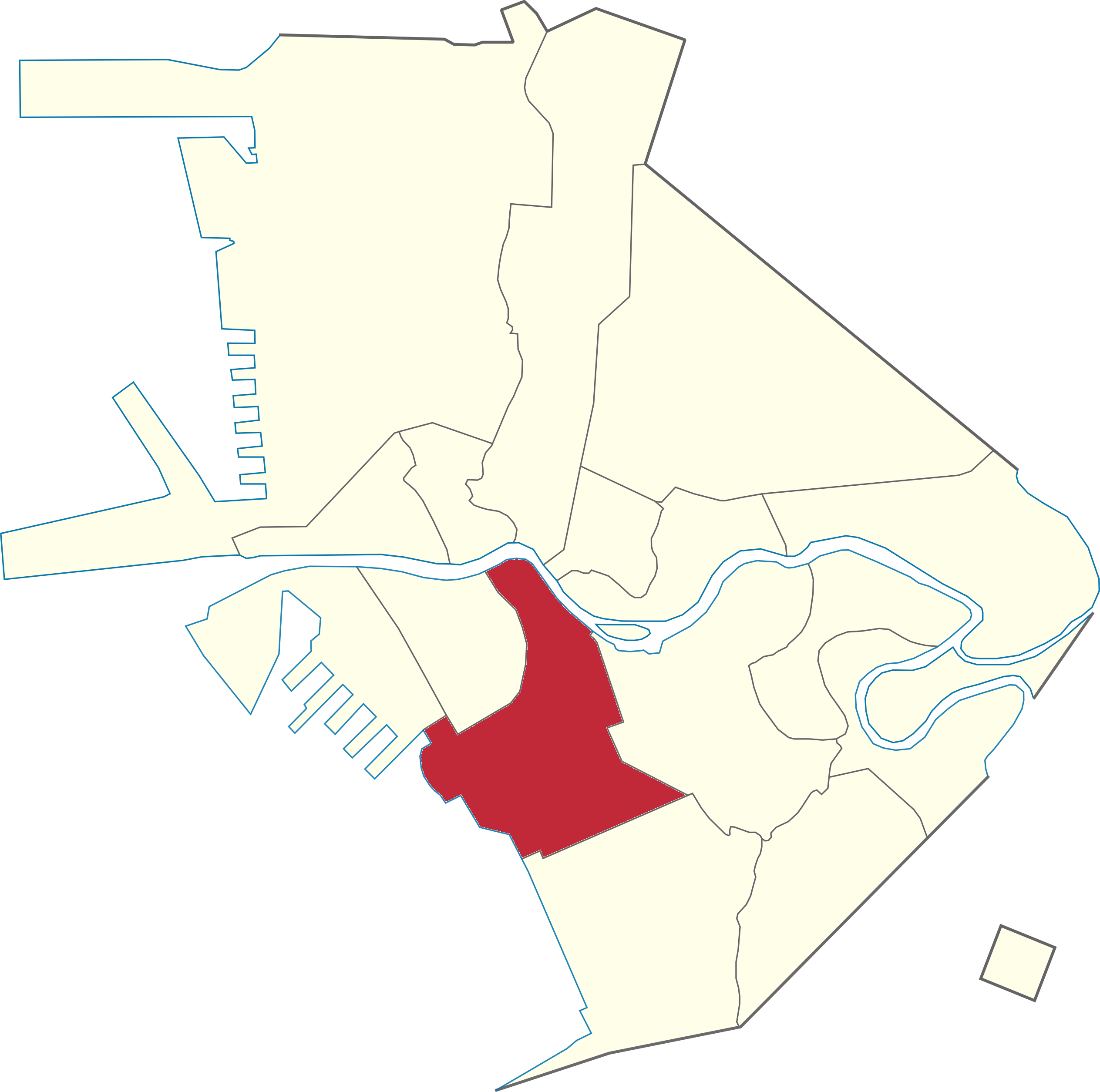
- Location within City of Manila
- Interactive map of Ermita
- Country: Philippines
- Region: National Capital Region
- City: Manila
- District: Part of the 5th district of Manila
- Barangays: 13

Area
  - Total: 1.59 km^{2} (0.61 sq mi)

Population (2024 census)
  - Total: 22,863
  - Density: 14,400/km^{2} (37,200/sq mi)
- Time zone: UTC+08:00 (Philippine Standard Time)
- ZIP code: 1000 (Manila CPO)
- Area codes: 02

Ermita is a district in central Manila, Philippines. It is a significant center of finance, education, culture, and commerce. Ermita serves as the civic center of Manila, bearing the seat of city government and a large portion of the area's employment, business, and entertainment activities.

Private and government offices, museums, and universities thrive in Ermita. It is also home to several tourist attractions and landmarks, including Rizal Park.

Ermita and its neighboring district Malate were originally populated by Manila's high society in the early 20th century. The large houses of the affluent district and its surroundings were heavily bombed and flattened as it became a battleground during the Manila massacre in the Second World War. After the war, Ermita and Malate underwent commercialization, shifting from a sprawling upscale suburb to a commercial district.

It is also known as the birthplace of Gloria Macapagal Arroyo, the 14th President of the Philippines.

== History ==
=== Early history ===
Ermita was originally a town called Lagyo in Tagalog which was close to Manila.

During Spanish colonial period, the town was recorded by Miguel de Loarca in 1582:

On the coast near Manila are Laguo, Malahat, Longalo, Palañac, Vakol, Minacaya, and Cavite. All these settlements are in the neighborhood of Cavite, and belong to his Majesty, to whom they pay tribute.

— Miguel de Loarca, Relación de Yslas Filipinas (1582)

Lagyo was re-christened in the 17th century as La Hermita (Spanish for "the hermitage") after the fact that a Mexican hermit-priest named Juan Fernández de León had settled in the area. A hermitage was built on the site to enshrine a revered image of the Virgin Mary known as Nuestra Señora de Guía (Our Lady of Guidance). The hermitage has since evolved into Ermita Church, rebuilt several times since the early 17th century.

During the Spanish evacuation of Ternate in the Maluku Islands of present-day Indonesia, 200 volunteer Christian families of mixed Mexican, Filipino, Spanish, Papuan, Indonesian, and Portuguese descent who had ruled over the Sultanate of Ternate, including their sultan Saidi Berkat, were relocated to Ternate, Cavite and Ermita, Manila.

=== Upscale neighborhood, City Beautiful movement ===
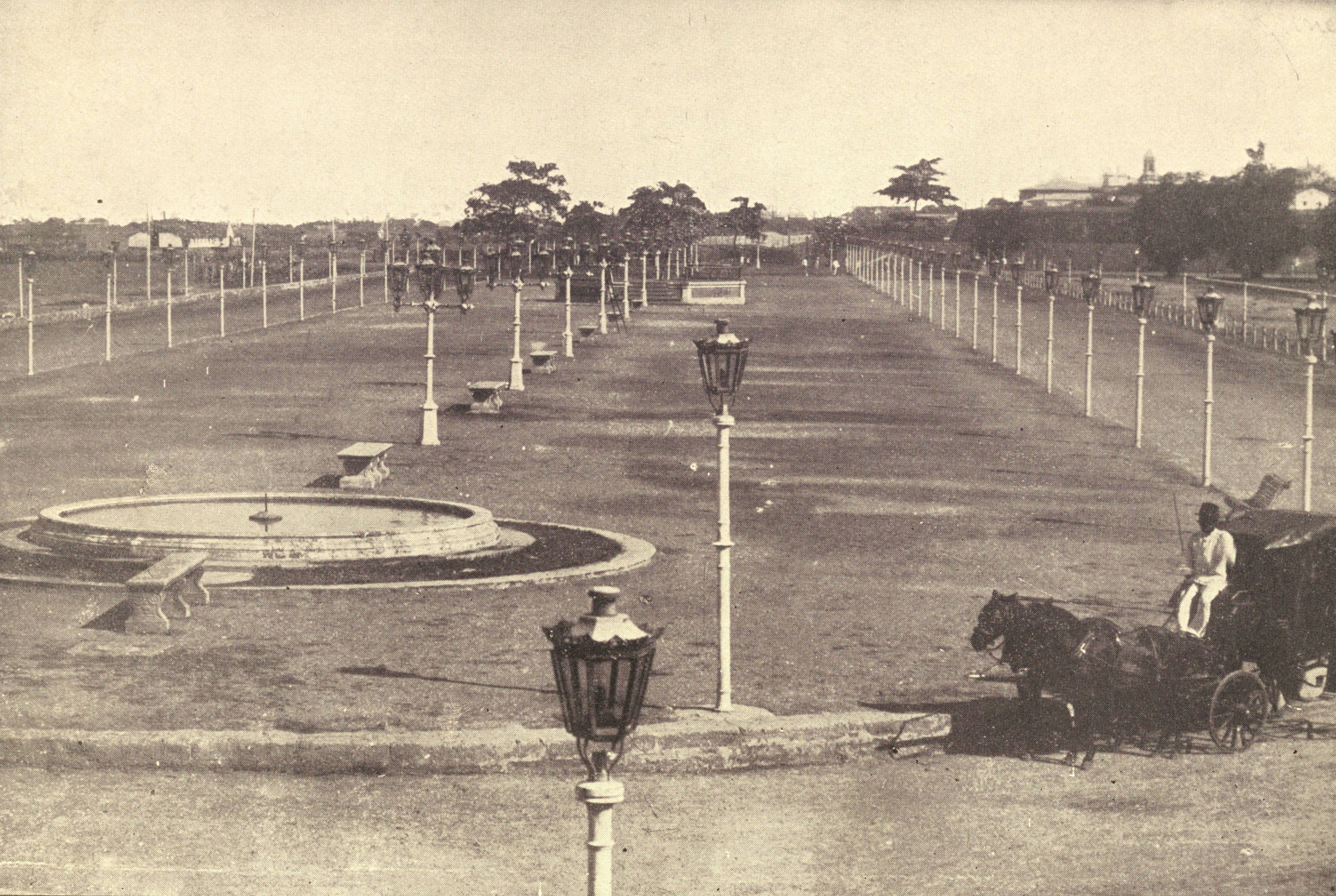
Luneta Promenade in the late 1890s

By the 19th century, although still considered as an "arrabal ", which refers to a rural area, urban expansion had slowly reached the northern portion of the area mainly due to the development of the Luneta, also called Bagumbayan, as a promenade at the coast of Manila Bay. This attracted wealthy Spaniards and prominent Filipino mestizos and started to build homes in the area, making it a residential hub. The area eventually developed a creole language based on Spanish called Ermiteño, which eventually became extinct after the devastation of the Second World War. However, it still has a surviving cousin language spoken in nearby Cavite.

The district also saw the construction of the Manila Observatory by Father Federico Faura during the early 1890s. It was once located on a street now named after Fr. Faura himself.

Ermita, now home to the houses of the wealthy as well as by other classes, gained renewed prominence during the American and Commonwealth era. The area, along with others surrounding Intramuros, had undergone a drastic redevelopment from being the outskirts to urban districts. Ermita was absorbed by the city of Manila when its limits were expanded outside the walled Intramuros. Its characteristics including the beautiful sunset of Manila Bay attracted sugar magnates from Pampanga and the Visayas to settle there. The wealthiest Spanish and Filipino families such as the Zobels and the Ynchaustis started building sprawling Art Deco and neoclassical mansions along Manila Bay.

Some of the notable mansions constructed in Ermita during this period includes the French Renaissance-styled Alfonso Zóbel Mansion, designed by Andrés Luna de San Pedro for Alfonso Zóbel and his wife Carmen Pfitz in the corner of Dewey Boulevard and Calle Padre Faura, the El Nido which was designed for American lawyer Eugene Arthur Perkins also by Luna in the style of Moorish Mediterranean and famously won the "Most Beautiful Home" award in 1928 and was a social club for the American High Commission and the elite society, and La Casona mansion of Don Jacobo Zóbel de Ayala and his wife Ángela Olgado, also designed by Luna and won the "Most Beautiful Home" award in 1929.

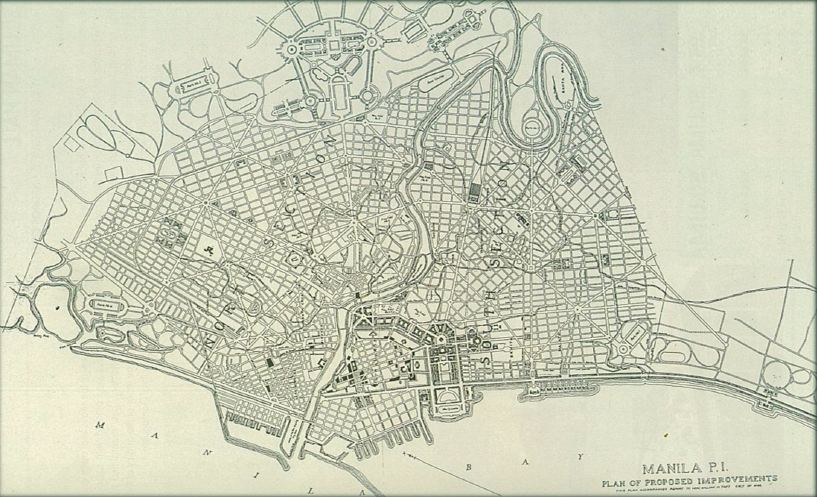
Burnham Plan of Manila, 1905

As part of Daniel Burnham's plans for Manila, influenced by the City Beautiful movement during the early 1900s, the district, which was already home to the wealthy's mansions, was envisioned as an exclusive residential area. In addition, the northern portion of the district was envisioned as the center of the Philippine government, redeveloping Luneta into a grand park patterned after that of the National Mall in Washington, D.C.. Government buildings housing the legislative, executive and judicial branches were planned and built around the park. A proposed Philippine capitol was also planned to be built at the eastern tip of Luneta Park but never materialized. The Manila Post Office, the neoclassical buildings that now house the National Museum of Fine Arts, National Museum of Natural Science, and the National Museum of Anthropology were built during this period.

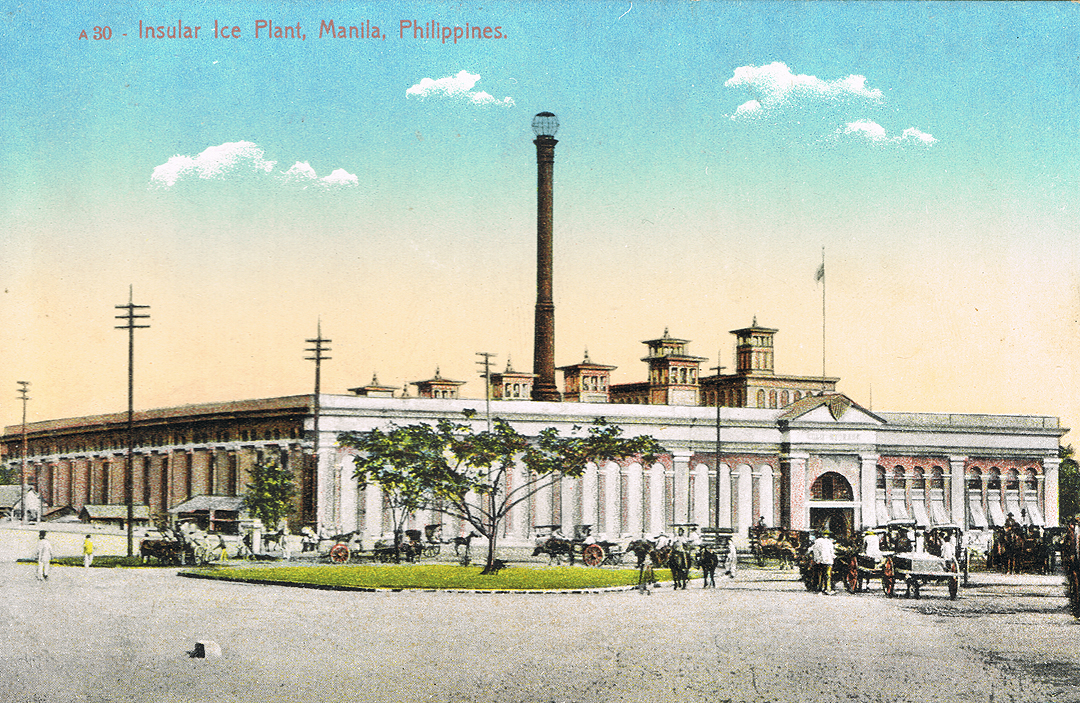
Insular Ice Plant

Another notable structure in the district during this time was the Insular Ice Plant, an ice production and storage facility at the southern end of the Puente Colgante designed in Mission Revivalist by consulting architect Edgar K. Bourne, who was also the head of the Bureau of Architecture of the Philippine Commission in 1902. It featured ten-story high smoke stack that became a city landmark, which inspired a common Filipino phrase "mabilis pa sa alas kwatro", referring to the four o'clock siren from the plant that signals the end of a workday.

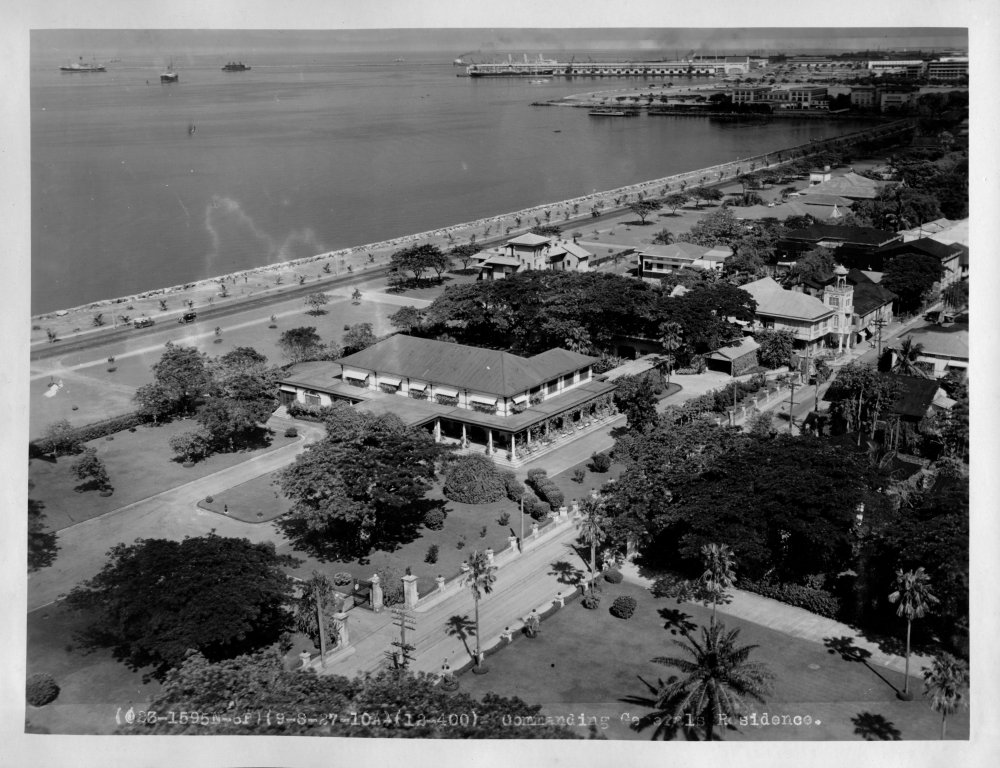
Aerial view of Ermita District facing Manila Bay

The district further solidified its status as an upscale neighborhood when it became known as the university district, containing the campuses and dormitories of the Philippine Normal University (1902), the Assumption College (1904), the St. Paul College (1912), the University of the Philippines (1908), the Ateneo de Manila (1932), and the Adamson University (1932). Meanwhile, in the residential portion of the district, American residents started to set up establishments such as the social clubs Army and Navy Club in a building designed by William E. Parsons and the University Club.

Aside from large mansions, the district were also home to vertical housing designed in Art Deco architecture, such as the Michelle, Angela, Rosario, North and South Syquia Apartments, Admiral and Bayview hotels, which attracted wealthy clientele of locals and foreigners.

By this time, Ermita, as well as its adjacent district of Malate, which both happened to be facing Manila Bay, were now home to Manila's high society and were filled with large, gilded mansions. It was an enclave of the rich and educated class, specifically the mestizo elite resulting from the miscegenation of native and Spanish aristocracies. Ermita is described to be different from other districts in the city because of its "bourgeois atmosphere".

=== Manila Massacre ===
During World War II, being an administrative and social heart of Manila, the district became the primary stage of the Battle of Manila and Manila Massacre and the subsequent destruction of the district's architectural heritage.

Ermita was the site of documented atrocities during the final weeks of the battle. Some of which were the rounding up of hundreds of women from surrounding neighborhoods who were then raped at the Bayview hotel, the detonation of mines and grenades at the dining hall of St. Paul's College where hundreds of civilians are taking refuge followed by a machine-gun fire on those trying to escape, and the burning of the German Club despite being a neutral site for European expatriates. Among the prominent victims who were executed in the district during the Manila Massacre include the wife and four children of future President Elpidio Quirino, the Supreme Court Associate Justice Anacleto Diaz and his sons.

The entire national collections of the National Museum, which are placed at the Legislative Building and the Bureau of Science Building for safekeeping, were destroyed when during the war. The buildings, instruments, and records of the Manila Observatory, which was originally built in Ermita in the 1890s, were all destroyed during the battle. This ended its function as the official government weather bureau.

As the Americans approach in February 1945, the Japanese Admiral Sanji Iwabuchi defied General Yamashita's orders to evacuate and instead turned the south of Manila (including Ermita) into a fortress. The Japanese used the neoclassical concrete buildings in the district such as the University of the Philippines and the Legislative Building as a reinforced bunkers. Because the Japanese were entrenched in these thick-walled structures, General MacArthur eventually authorized the use of heavy artillery which resulted in the systematic leveling of almost every landmark in the district.

Between 68% and 85% of Ermita was destroyed during the Battle of Manila, with an estimated total of 100,000 Filipino civilians killed within the city.

=== Postwar, transformation to commercial district ===
After the war, the district slowly transformed from a residential area into a commercial area as the upper classes moved to other cities such as Quezon City and Makati. Ermita was rebuilt after the devastation of the war. University life remained vibrant therein. However, as decades passed, Ermita started earning a reputation as the red-light district of Manila. During the first term of Mayor Alfredo Lim, 1992–1998, efforts were made to "clean up" Ermita's image and reputation. However, a local city ordinance prohibiting the establishment of motels, lodging houses, and other similar establishments was later declared unconstitutional by the Supreme Court. Nightlife in the area dwindled, though it later picked up with the help of the emergence of the nearby Malate district and the Roxas Boulevard revitalization efforts along Manila Bay.

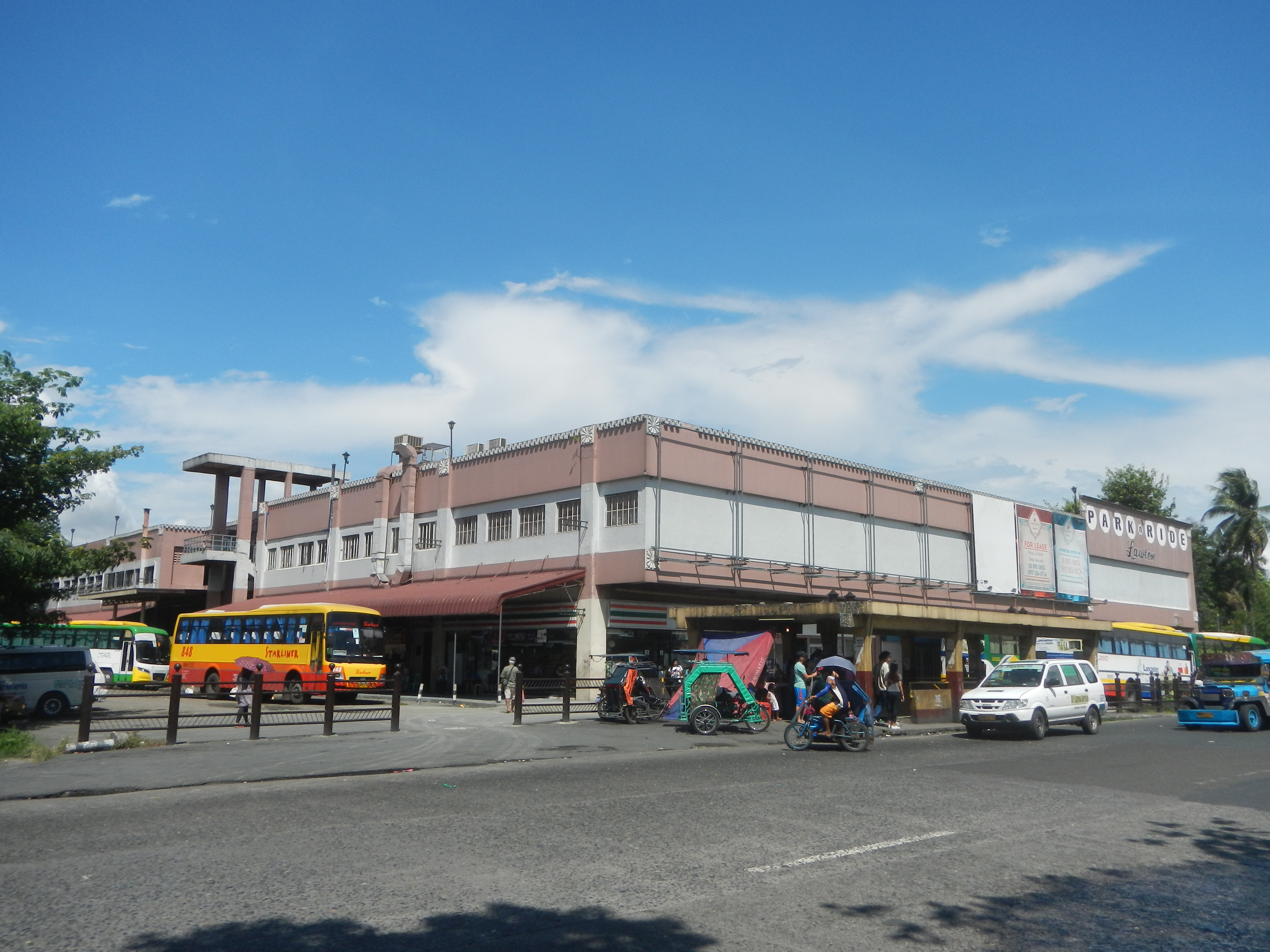
Lawton Park N Ride

== Transportation ==
The district can be directly accessed by the main roads such as Roxas Boulevard, Padre Burgos Street, Taft Avenue and United Nations Avenue. Lawton Park N Ride, the city's main public transport hub, is located in the district along Padre Burgos Street, as well as the Manila Multimodal Terminal near the Pasig River.

The Manila Light Rail Transit System (LRT-1) follows Taft Avenue and stops at three stations in Ermita, namely Central Terminal station, United Nations station and Pedro Gil station.

Pasig River Ferry Service has a ferry station in the district named Lawton.

== Points of interest ==
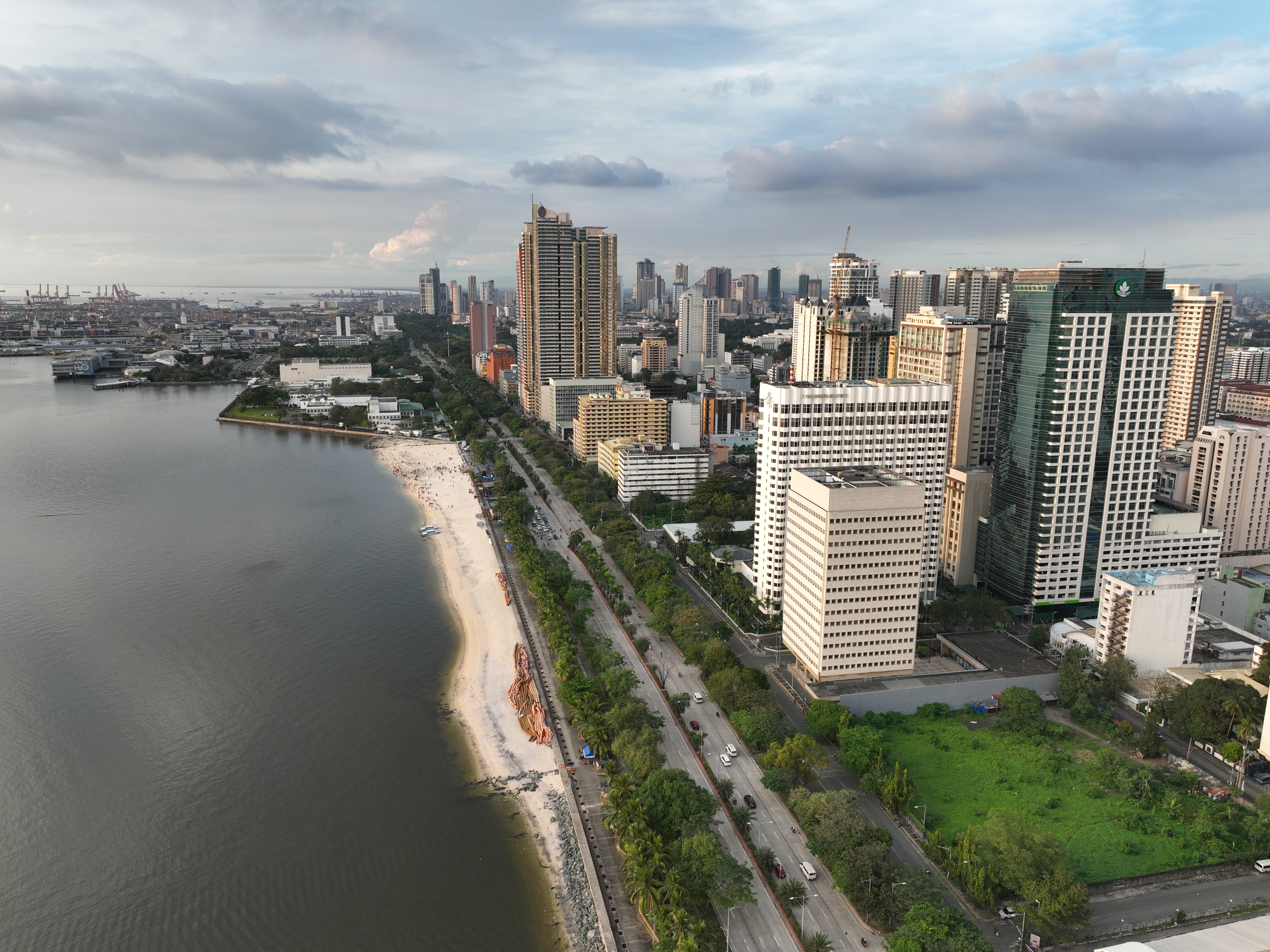
Drone shot of Ermita along Manila Bay

The most prominent feature of Ermita is the historic Rizal Park, one of the largest urban public parks in the Philippines and in Asia. It was a public promenade during the Spanish colonial era which became the site of execution of national hero José Rizal. Today, it contains the Rizal Monument at the center, parts of the National Museum complex to the north which includes the Agrifina Circle, the National Museum of Natural History, and the National Museum of Anthropology, and the Burnham Green, Quirino Grandstand, and the Manila Ocean Park to the south. It also contains numerous gardens and event venues such as a Chinese Garden, a Japanese Garden, the Noli Me Tangere Garden, and the Orchidarium and Butterfly Pavilion.

Other notable public squares around Ermita include the Liwasang Bonifacio, located in front of the Manila Central Post Office, a neoclassical building designed by Juan M. Arellano and Tomas B. Mapua in 1926. The building was declared as a National Historical Landmarks in 1994. The square also has a monument of Andrés Bonifacio, of whom the square was named after, designed by national artist Guillermo Tolentino. The Kartilya ng Katipunan monument is a public plaza with a monument of Andrés Bonifacio and the Philippine Revolution as a centerpiece.

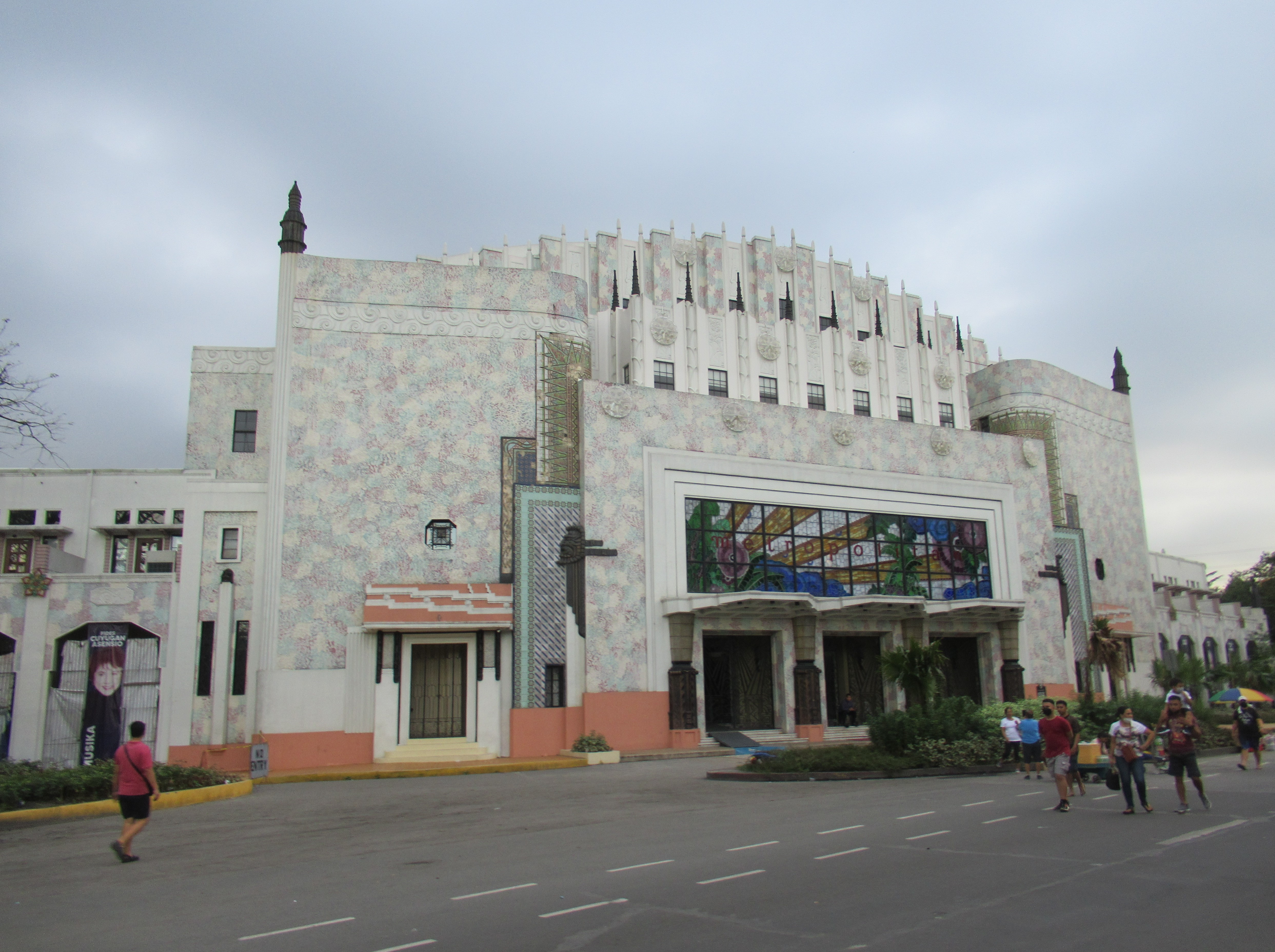
Manila Metropolitan Theater along Padre Burgos Street

A notable structure nearby Liwasang Bonifacio is the Metropolitan Theater, a historic Art Deco performing arts theater designed by Juan M. Arellano in 1928. It has been declared as a National Cultural Treasures.

The Arroceros Forest Park is a park on the south bank of the Pasig River, by the foot of Quezon Bridge. It consists of secondary growth forest with 61 tree varieties and 8,000 ornamental plants providing a habitat for 10 different bird species. Being the only nature park in the city, it is often referred to as Manila's "last lung", with lower temperatures in the park that highlights the park's role in combating the urban heat island effect in the city. Another famous green space located in the district is the Mehan Garden, a botanical garden established in 1858 that was turned into a public park.

The historic Manila Hotel is located in the district. A five-star hotel located along Manila Bay, it is the oldest premiere hotel in the Philippines built in 1909. It The hotel complex was built on a reclaimed area of 35,000 square metres (380,000 sq ft) at the northwestern end of Rizal Park along Bonifacio Drive in Ermita. Its penthouse served as the residence of General Douglas MacArthur during his tenure as the Military Advisor of the Philippine Commonwealth from 1935 to 1941. It has since hosted world leaders and celebrities, including authors Ernest Hemingway and James A. Michener; actors Douglas Fairbanks Jr. and John Wayne; publisher Henry Luce; entertainers Sammy Davis Jr., Michael Jackson and The Beatles; Charles, Prince of Wales (now King Charles III); and U.S. President Bill Clinton.

Ermita Church, founded in 1606, is located in a modern architecture church building and is the home to the Marian image of the Immaculate Concepcion known as Nuestra Señora de Guía, which is considered to be oldest in the Philippines. The San Vicente de Paul Church, built in 1912, bears a historical marker from the Historical Research and Markers Committee.

== Institutions ==
- Insurance Commission
- Manila Doctors Hospital
- Medical Center Manila
- Department of Justice (Philippines)
- National Bureau of Investigation
- Philippine General Hospital, the country's largest hospital
- Supreme Court of the Philippines
- Court of Appeals of the Philippines
- World Health Organization Western Pacific Region Headquarters
- Embassy of the United States

== Education ==
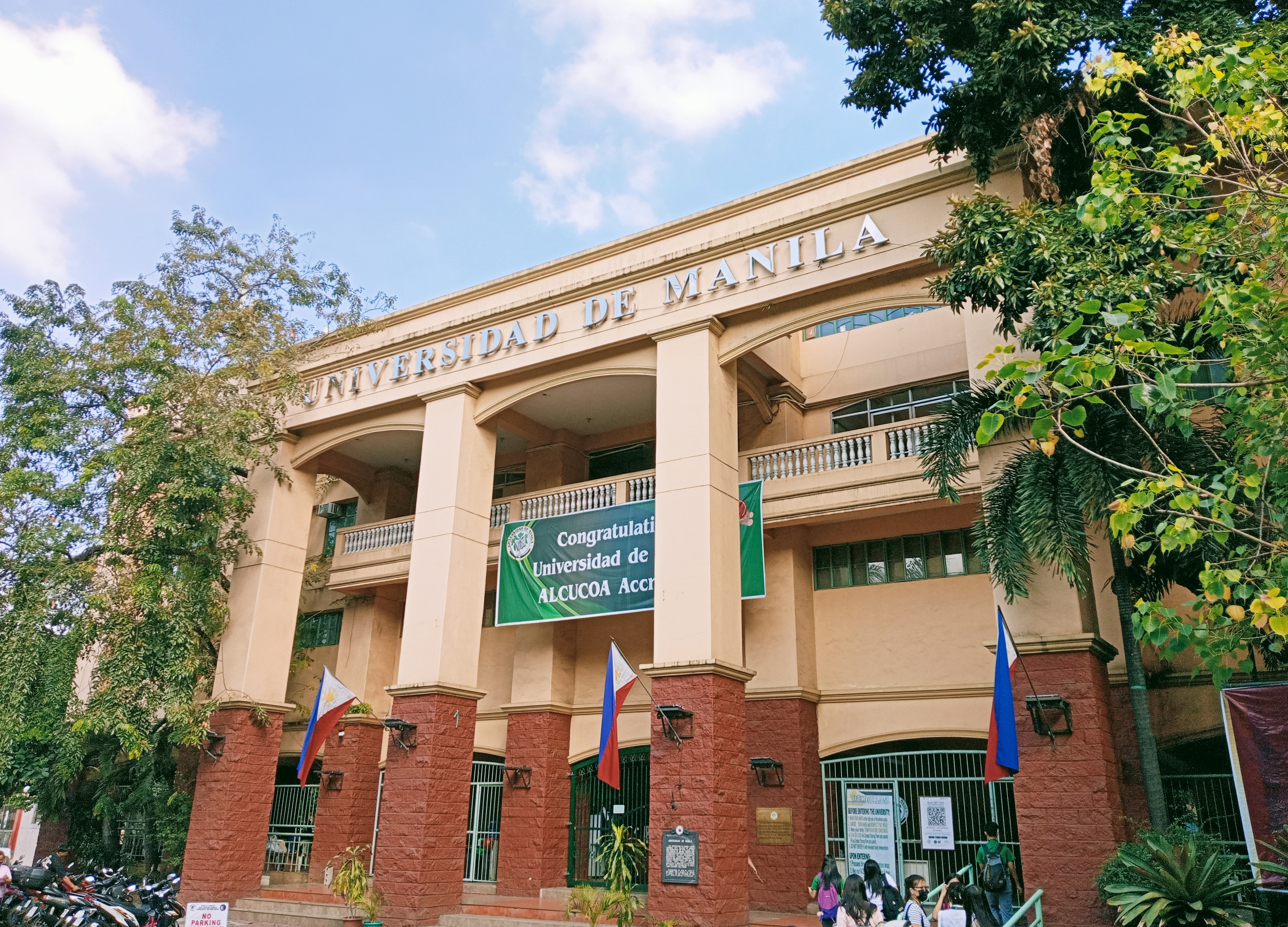
Universidad de Manila, a local university funded by the Manila local government

A number of educational institutions are also found in Ermita, including:

- University of the Philippines Manila
- Adamson University
- Emilio Aguinaldo College
- Santa Isabel College Manila
- Philippine Normal University
- Technological University of the Philippines
- Universidad de Manila (formerly the City College of Manila)
- Manila Science High School
- Araullo High School

== Barangays ==
Ermita comprises 13 barangays numbered 659, 659-A, 660, 660-A, 661, 663, 663-A, 664, 666, 667, 668, 669, and 670.

Barangays 659 to 664 are part of Zone 71 of the City of Manila, while barangays 666 to 670 are part of Zone 72.

Barangay	Land area (km^{2})	Population (2024 census)
Zone 71
Barangay 659	0.1403 km^{2}	439
Barangay 659-A	0.3553 km^{2}	3,547
Barangay 660	0.05628 km^{2}	387
Barangay 660-A	0.1159 km^{2}	3,099
Barangay 661	0.1222 km^{2}	486
Barangay 663	0.05173 km^{2}	704
Barangay 663-A	0.07525 km^{2}	185
Barangay 664	0.1429 km^{2}	555
Zone 72
Barangay 666	0.6910 km^{2}	904
Barangay 667	0.1991 km^{2}	3,010
Barangay 668	0.1559 km^{2}	2,905
Barangay 669	0.2455 km^{2}	3,738
Barangay 670	0.1419 km^{2}	2,904

== Notable people ==
- Abeng Remulla, 39th Governor of Cavite
- Luis Campos, former congressman and son-in-law of former vice president Jejomar Binay
- Mark Cojuangco, congressman
- José W. Diokno, statesman
- León María Guerrero, congressman and botanist
- León Ma. Guerrero III, translator and diplomat
- Monique Lagdameo, vice-mayor of Makati
- Gloria Macapagal-Arroyo, President of the Philippines (2001-2010)
- Raul Manglapus, senator
- Luis Raymund Villafuerte, Governor of Camarines Sur
- Fernando Zobel de Ayala, businessman
- Fernando Zóbel de Ayala y Montojo, painter

== In popular culture ==
- Ermita was referenced in pop/rock band Eraserheads's song Ang Huling El Bimbo from their 1995 studio album Cutterpillow.
