= Manila massacre =

1945 massacre in the Philippines by Japan

Coordinates: 14.590°N 120.975°E

- Part of the Battle of Manila of World War II
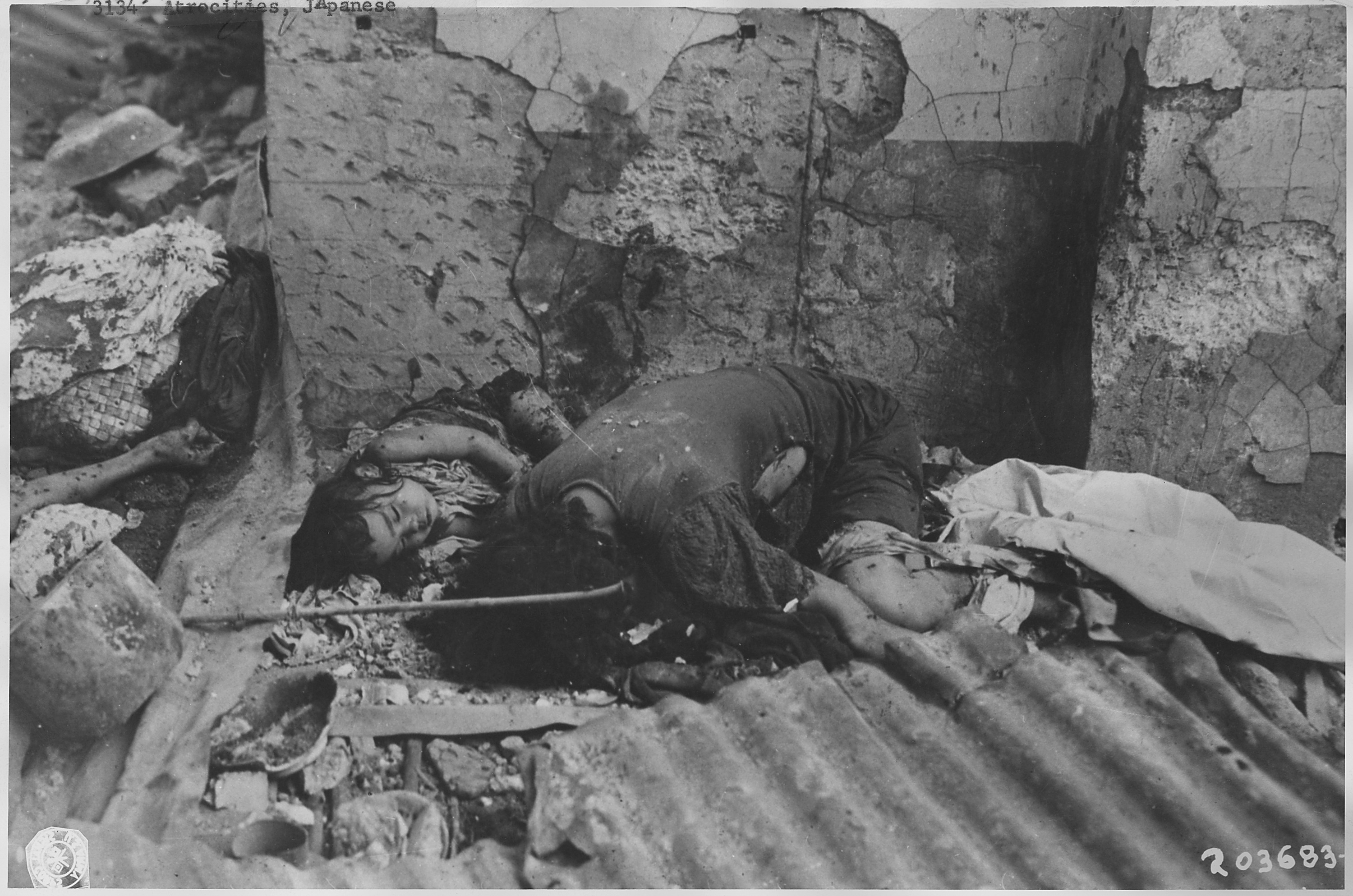
- Photo of a Filipino woman and child killed by Japanese forces in Manila
- Location: Manila, the Philippines
- Date: 3 February – 3 March 1945 (EDT)
- Target: Filipinos
- Attack type: War crime, massacre, wartime sexual violence, state terrorism
- Deaths: 100,000 during the battle, most of which were from the massacre estimated between 100,000–500,000
- Perpetrators: Sanji Iwabuchi, Tomoyuki Yamashita, Akira Mutō, Imperial Japanese Navy
- Motive: Japanese nationalism, anti-Filipino sentiment

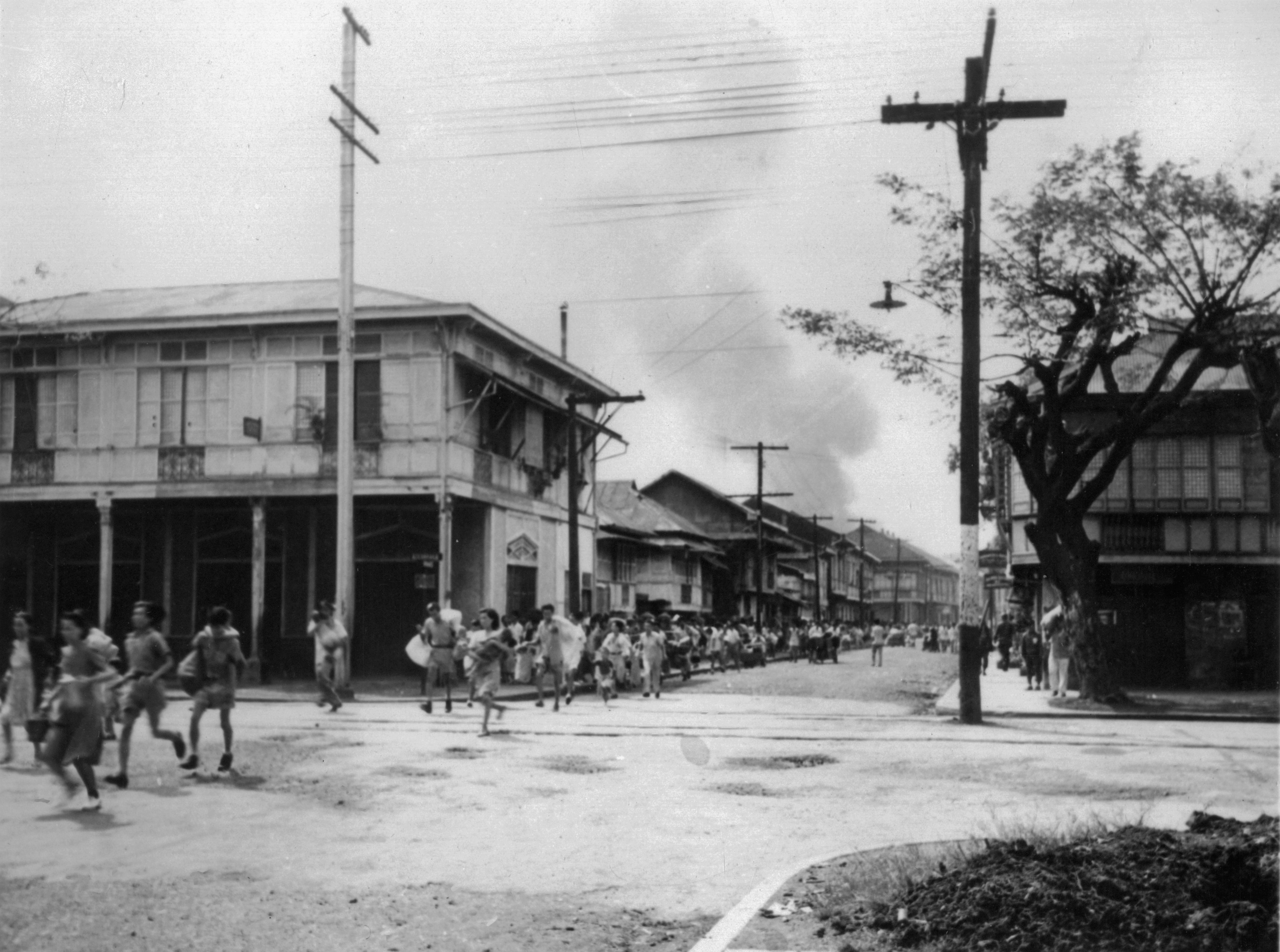
Citizens of Manila run for safety from suburbs burned by Japanese soldiers, 10 February 1945.

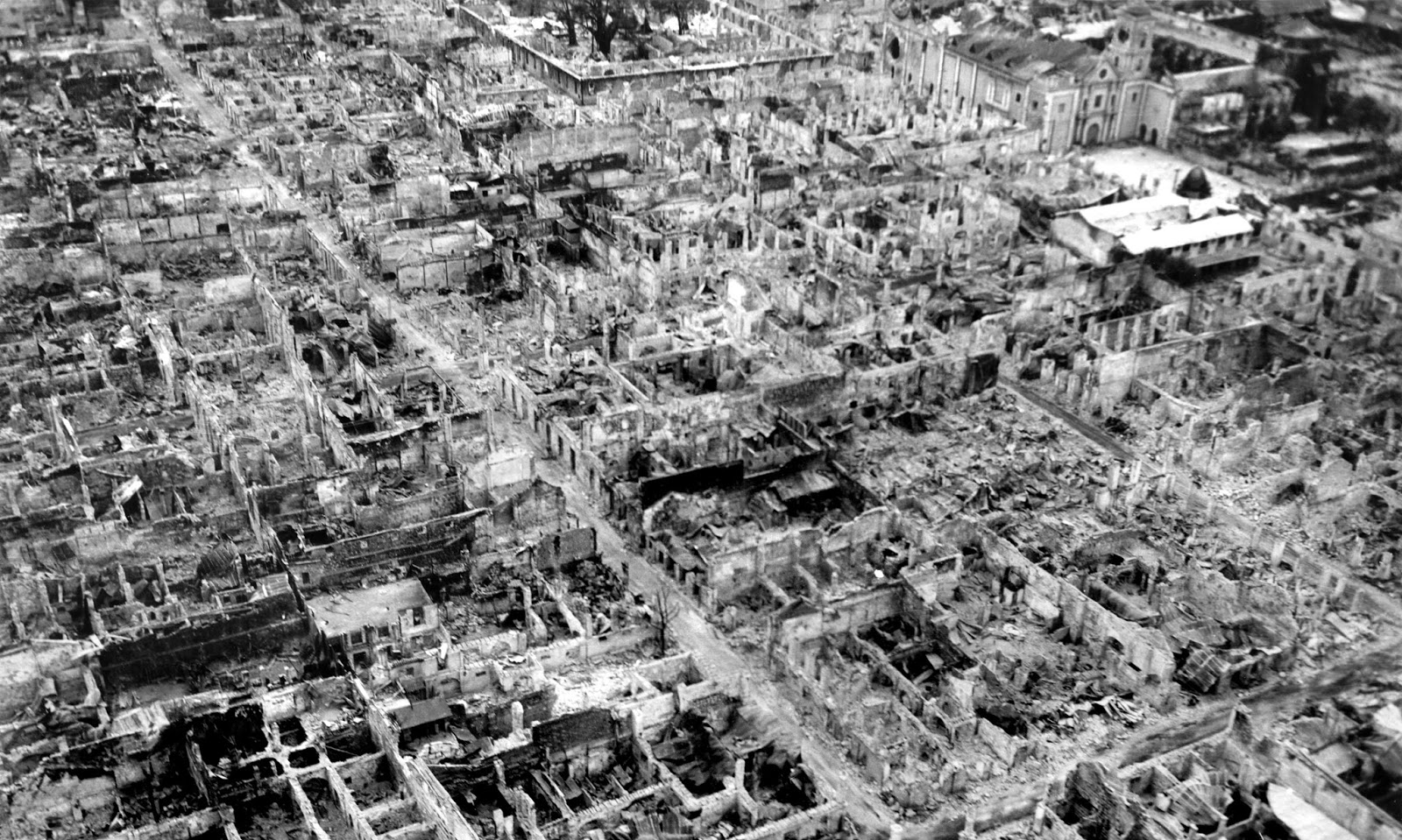
Destruction of the Walled City (Intramuros), 1945

The Manila massacre (Filipino: Pagpatay sa Maynila or Masaker sa Maynila), also called the Rape of Manila (Paggahasa ng Maynila), involved atrocities committed against Filipino civilians in the City of Manila, the capital of the Philippines, by Japanese troops during the Battle of Manila (3 February 1945 – 3 March 1945) which occurred during World War II. At least 100,000 civilians were killed in total during the battle from all causes, including the massacre by Japanese troops.

The Manila massacre was one of several major war crimes committed by the Imperial Japanese Navy. The Japanese commanding admiral, Sanji Iwabuchi, who stood behind the massacre committed suicide during the battle. The Japanese commanding general, Tomoyuki Yamashita, and his chief of staff Akira Mutō, were held responsible for the massacre and other war crimes in a trial which started in October 1945. Yamashita was hanged on 23 February 1946 and Mutō on 23 December 1948.

== Description ==
=== Massacre ===
The Americans who have penetrated into Manila have about 1000 troops, and there are several thousand Filipino soldiers under the Commonwealth Army and the organized guerrillas. Even women and children have become guerrillas. All people on the battlefield with the exception of Japanese military personnel, Japanese civilians, and special construction units will be put to death.

— Japanese order justifying the Manila massacre

Before the battle, deciding that he would be unable to defend Manila with the forces available to him, and to preserve as large a force as possible in the rural, more defensible Sierra Madre mountain region of northern Luzon, General Tomoyuki Yamashita had insisted on a complete withdrawal of Japanese troops from Manila in January 1945. However, Yamashita's order was ignored by about 10,000 Japanese marines under Rear Admiral Sanji Iwabuchi who chose to remain in Manila.

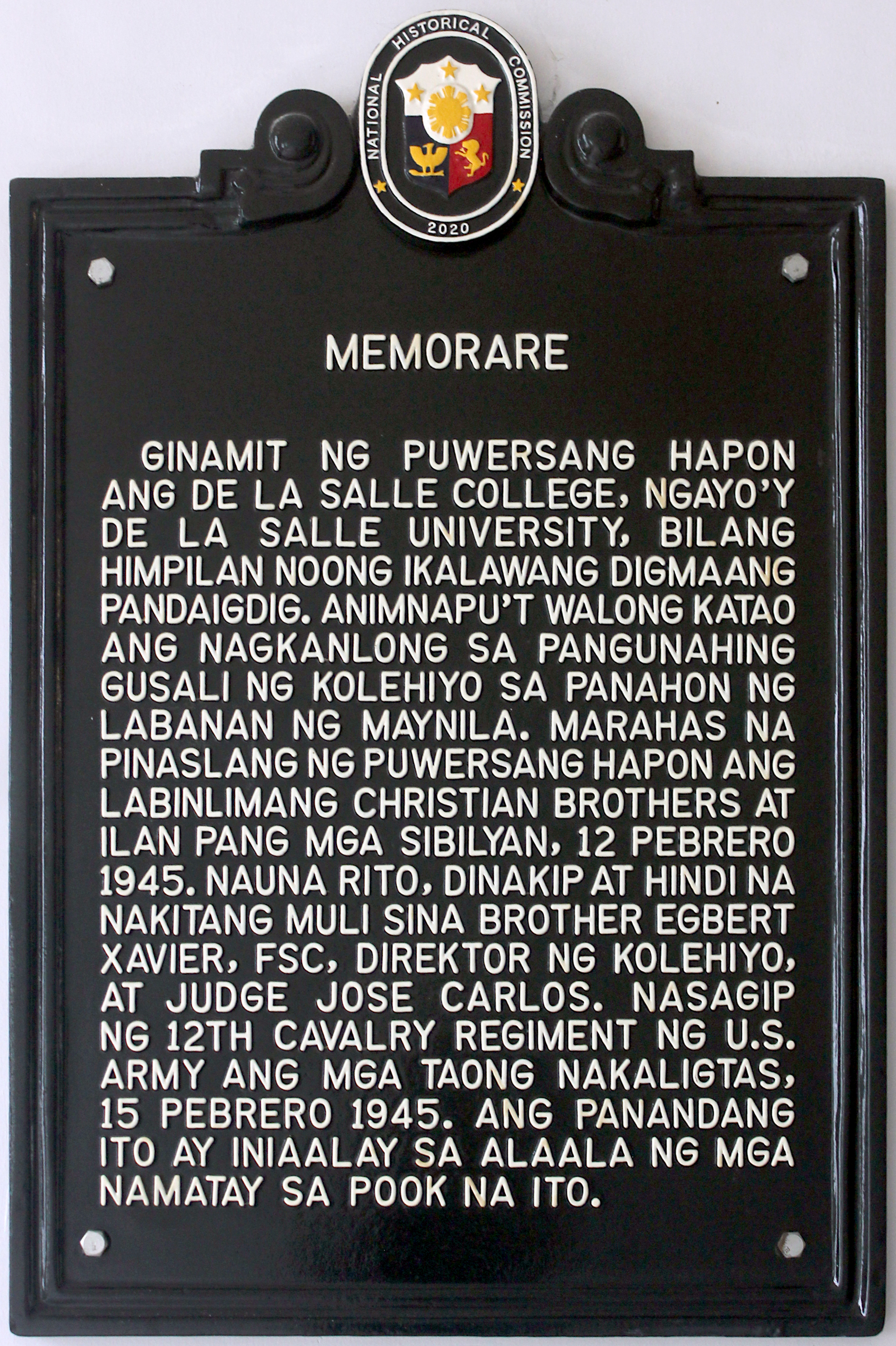
Historical marker installed in 2020 inside the De La Salle University to commemorate the massacre victims in the school

In the Battle of Manila from February to March 1945, the United States Army advanced into the city of Manila in order to drive the Japanese out. During lulls in the battle for control of the city, Japanese troops took their anger and frustration out on the civilians in the city. Violent mutilations, rapes, and massacres occurred in schools, hospitals and convents, including San Juan de Dios Hospital, Santa Rosa College, Santo Domingo Church, Manila Cathedral, Paco Church, St. Paul's Convent, and St. Vincent de Paul Church.

Dr. Antonio Gisbert told of the murder of his father and brother at the Palacio del Gobernador, saying, "I am one of those few survivors, not more than 50 in all out of more than 3000 men herded into Fort Santiago and, two days later, massacred.

The Japanese forced Filipino women and children into the front lines as human shields to protect Japanese positions. Those who survived were then murdered by the Japanese.

=== Mop-up operations ===
The Japanese conducted mop-up operations to clear north Manila of guerrillas, executing more than 54,000 Filipinos, including children, as they passed through towns.

Pregnant Filipino women were murdered by having their bellies ripped open while Filipino civilians trying to flee were executed.

=== Mass rapes ===
The Bayview Hotel was used as a designated "rape center". According to testimony at the Yamashita war crimes trial, 400 women and girls were rounded up from Manila's wealthy Ermita district, and submitted to a selection board that picked out the 25 women who were considered most beautiful. These women and girls, many of them 12 to 14 years old, were then taken to the hotel, where Japanese enlisted men and officers took turns raping them.

Despite many allied Germans holding refuge in a German club, Japanese soldiers entered in and bayoneted infants and children of mothers pleading for mercy and raped women seeking refuge. At least 20 Japanese soldiers raped a young girl before slicing her breasts off after which a Japanese soldier placed her mutilated breasts on his chest to mimic a woman while the other Japanese soldiers laughed. The Japanese then doused the young girl and two other women who were raped to death in gasoline and set them all on fire.

The Japanese went on setting the entire club on fire killing many of its inhabitants. Women who were escaping out the building from the fire were caught and raped by the Japanese. 28-year-old Julia Lopez had her breasts sliced off, was raped by Japanese soldiers and had her hair set on fire. Another woman was partially decapitated after attempting to defend herself and raped by a Japanese soldier.

=== Death toll ===
The combined death toll of civilians for the Battle of Manila was about 100,000, most of which was attributed to massacres by Japanese forces. Some historians, citing a higher civilian casualty rate for the entire battle, suggest that 100,000 to 500,000 died as a result of the Manila massacre on its own, exclusive of other causes.

== Timeline of notable atrocities ==
- 1 January to 17 February 1945 – patients and civilian refugees at the Philippine General Hospital were killed by shellfire.
- 6 to 22 February 1945 – about 6,000 non-combatants interned in San Agustin Church in Intramuros were killed. Many either starved to death or used as human shields.
- 3 February 1945 – in Dy-Pac Lumberyard in Tondo, Manila, around 116 men, women and children were executed. In the Old Bilibid prison in Ermita and the New Bilibid Prison in Muntinlupa, many were executed without cause or trial.
- February 1945 – Masonic Temple murder of at least 100 people.
- 7 February 1945 – clergymen from the Malate church were killed in the nearby Syquia Apartments.
- 8 February 1945 – La Concordia College massacre, about 2,000 non-combatants were killed from gunfire and debris.
- 8 to 10 February 1945 – Colegio de Sta. Rosa massacre of non-combatants in Intramuros.
- 9 February 1945 – St. Paul College in Malate, more than 600 noncombatants were executed, injuring more than 370, and burning of buildings.
- 9 to 10 February 1945 – Saint Vincent de Paul House and San Marcelino church massacres, killing many non-combatants and religious.
- 9 to 17 February 1945 – abuse of more than 400 women from Bay View Hotel (the so called "rape center"), Alharabra Apartment Hotel, Mir amor Apartment Hotel and Manila Hotel, all in Ermita, Manila; repeated sexual assault of 40 women and attempted rape of 36.
- 10 February 1945 – in Taft Avenue and Padre Faura Street, Associate Justice Anacleto Diaz, his two sons and about 300 others were killed via machine gun fire. In Paco, more than 300 people. In the Philippine Red Cross Building (now Manila Med), more than 53 men were killed.Rape of civilian women at the nurses home of the Philippine General Hospital. Santo Domingo Church in Intramuros where civilians perished by gunfire. German Club where about 100 civilians were killed in the building set on fire, many choked from the smoke and 1,500 more in its vicinity killed.
- 10 to 23 February 1945 – about 4,000 detained persons were starved, tortured, burned alive and/or left to die in Fort Santiago in Intramuros.
- 11 February 1945 – at the Tabacalera Cigar and Cigarette Factory and the Shell Service Station, 43 individuals were rounded up and killed.
- 12 February 1945 – De La Salle College massacre of 16 brothers of the college, rape of two civilian women and one attempted intercourse with a dead woman. A total of 41 were killed.
- 14 February 1945 – Ateneo de Manila, where about 100 non-combatants were killed from bombs thrown by the Japanese.
- 19 to 20 February 1945 – about 100 Catholic priests, Spaniards and other civilians in air raid shelters in Fort McKinley (now Fort Bonifacio) were killed.
- 19 February 1945 – Palacio del Gobernador at Palacio Real in Intramuros, where 142 Filipino and Spanish were bombed by grenades.

== General Yamashita's role in the massacre ==
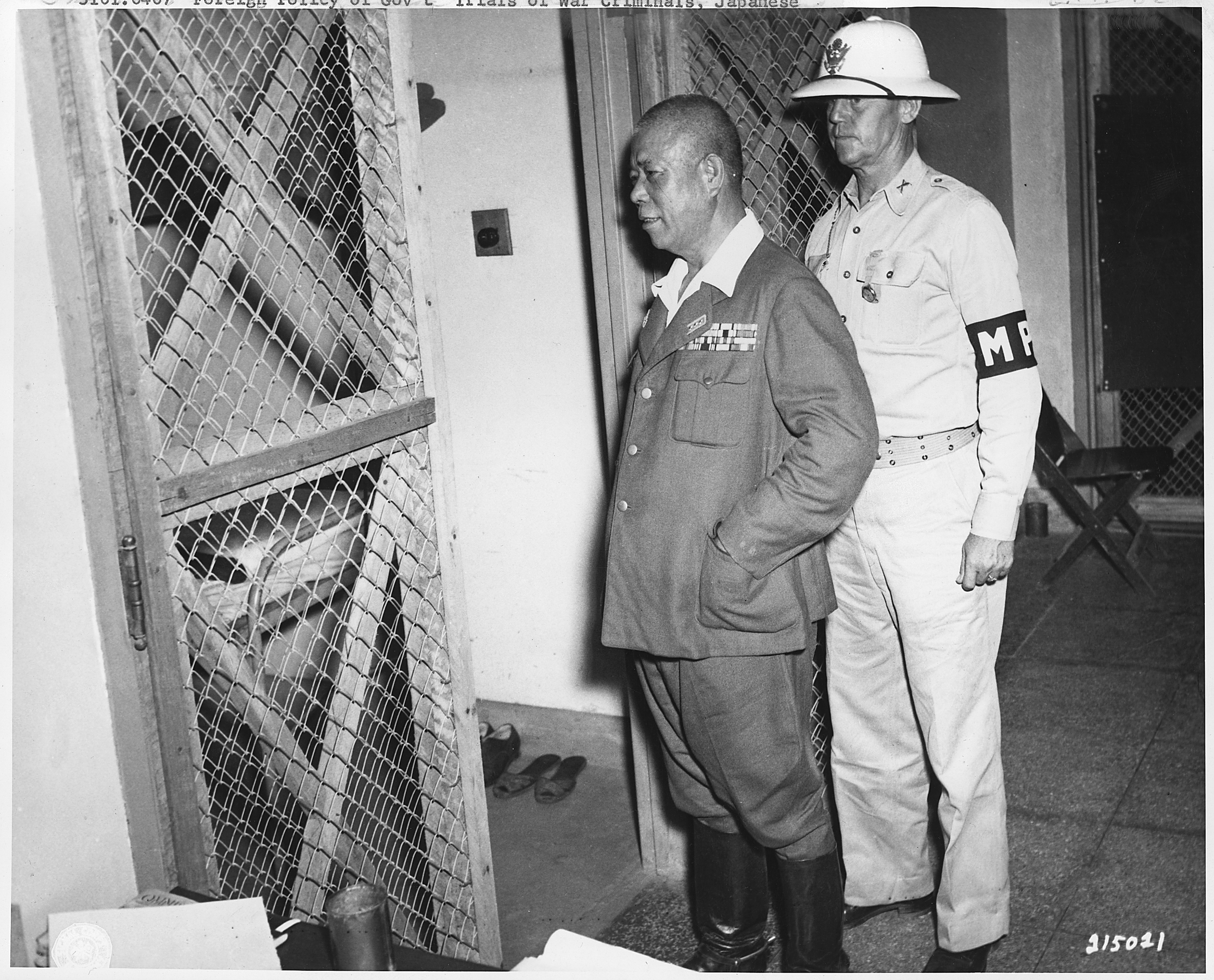
General Tomoyuki Yamashita, guarded by military police, returns to his cell at the end of a day in court listening to testimony against him in the war crimes trial in Manila.

General Tomoyuki Yamashita was convicted as a war criminal for the Manila massacre, although Admiral Iwabuchi's marines had committed the atrocities and Yamashita had earlier ordered him to evacuate Manila. Iwabuchi himself committed suicide in the face of imminent defeat near the end of the Battle of Manila. Former war-crimes prosecutor and author Allan Ryan argues that there was no evidence that Yamashita committed crimes there, ordered others to do so, was in a position to prevent them, or even suspected they were about to happen.

However, the problem with this argument was that Yamashita's lawyers resorted to using a chain of command technicality defense related to how the Japanese Navy were solely responsible for the massacre in Manila as a way to excuse Yamashita of committing all war crimes in the Philippines, of which there were many outside of Manila, according to the Chief of the Government Section for the Supreme Commander for the Allied Powers and Chief of Civil Affairs Section, U.S. Army Forces, Pacific Ocean Area, Brigadier General Courtney Whitney. Yamashita was actually held responsible for many other war crimes that the prosecution claimed was a systematic campaign to torture and kill Filipino civilians and Allied POWs as shown in the Palawan massacre of 139 U.S. POWs, wanton executions of guerrillas, soldiers, and civilians without due process like the execution of Philippine Army general Vicente Lim in December 1944, and the massacre of 25,000 civilians in Batangas Province. These crimes that were committed outside of the Manila massacre were done by the Japanese Army, not the Navy. It was argued that Yamashita was in full command of the Japanese Army's secret military police, the Kempeitai, which committed numerous war crimes on POWs and civilian internees and he simply nodded his head without protest when asked by his Kempeitai subordinates to execute people without due process or trials because there were too many prisoners to do proper trials. Philippine Army generals Lim, Simeon de Jesus, and Fidel Segundo were beheaded alongside hundreds of other people in mass graves by Army soldiers in Manila without a trial or due process on Yamashita's orders, long before Yamashita left Manila. The Japanese Navy and Rear Admiral Sanji Iwabuchi had nothing to do with the massacres done by Yamashita's Kempeitai and regular Army soldiers that were under his chain of command. Yamashita's lawyers tried to claim, to no avail, that for all of these Army massacres that Yamashita had no responsibility whatsoever and didn't know anything.

General MacArthur, five other generals, and the Supreme Court of the United States ultimately held Yamashita responsible for war crimes since he was in command of all Japanese troops in the Philippines at the time. President Harry S. Truman also agreed with the verdict and chose not to pardon Yamashita or commute his sentence. Yamashita was convicted on the grounds that he made no attempt to discover or stop atrocities from being committed. This would become known as the Yamashita standard. A group of American military lawyers attempted to defend General Yamashita by appealing to the U.S. Supreme Court, but the appeal failed, 5 votes to 2. As a result, Yamashita was sentenced to death by hanging. He was hanged on 23 February 1946 in a camp south of Manila. The two dissenting Supreme Court Justices called the entire trial a miscarriage of justice, an exercise in vengeance, and a denial of human rights.

== See also ==
- Battle of Manila (1945)
- Bataan Death March
- De La Salle Brothers Philippine District
- Nanjing Massacre
- Philippine War Crimes Commission
