= Philippine War Crimes Commission =

Post–World War II commission

Agency overview
- Formed: 1945
- Dissolved: 1949
- Headquarters: Manila, Philippines
- Parent agency: Supreme Commander of the Allied Powers

The Philippine War Crimes Commission (Filipino: Komisyon ng mga Krimen sa Digmaan ng Pilipinas) was a commission created in late 1945 by General Douglas MacArthur as Supreme Commander of the Allied Powers to investigate the war crimes committed by the Imperial Japanese Army and Imperial Japanese Navy during the invasion, occupation, and liberation of the Philippines. The investigation by the Commission led to the extradition, prosecution, and conviction of Class A, Class B, and Class C defendants in Manila, Tokyo, and other cities in East and Southeast Asia through the International Military Tribunal for the Far East.

== Background ==
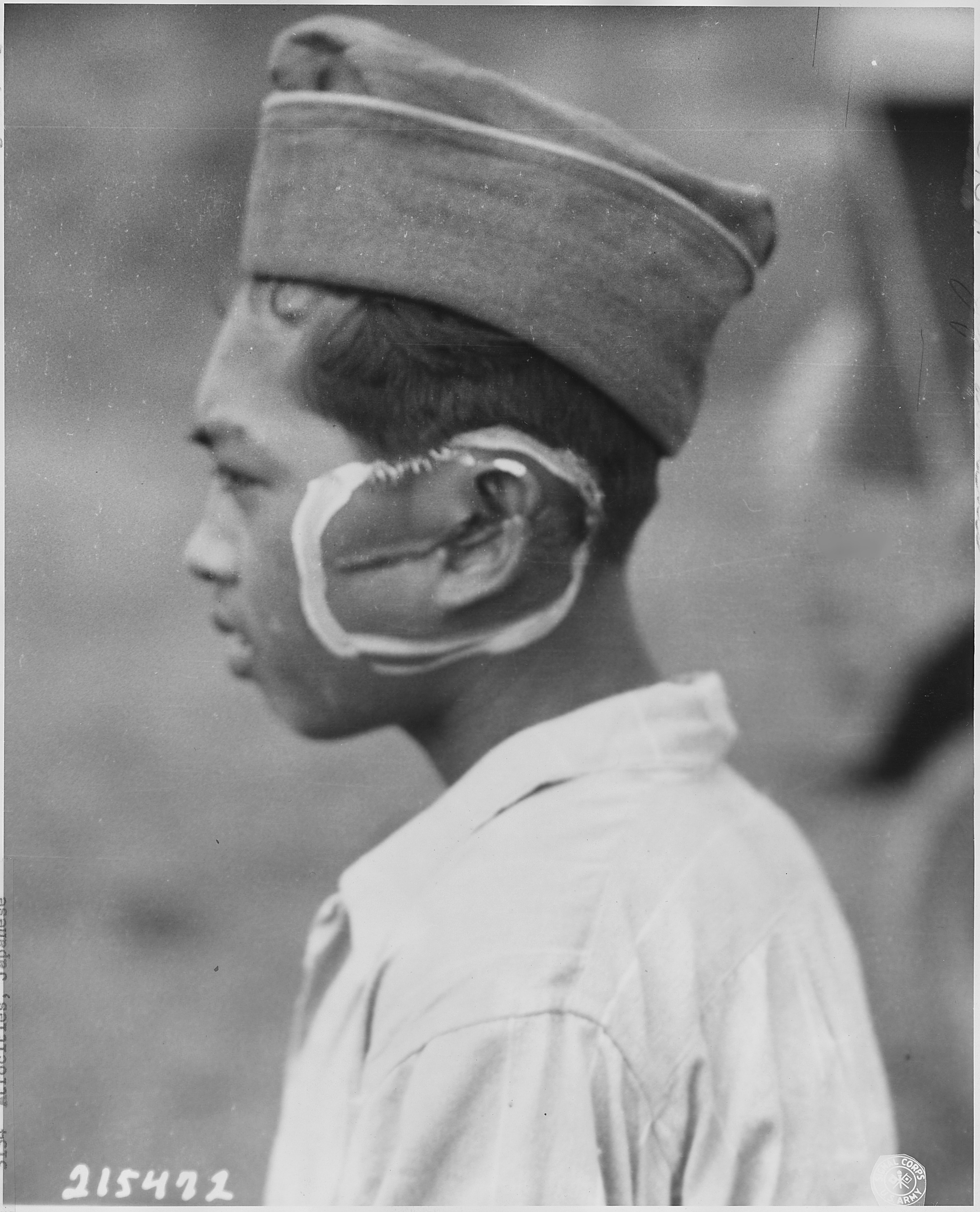
A scar on the face and ear of a young Filipino boy, the result of mutilation inflicted by Japanese soldiers

During the invasion of the Philippines in December 1941, the Japanese Fourteenth Area Army headed by Lieutenant General Masaharu Homma, and the Imperial Japanese Navy's 3rd Fleet swept through the Filipino main island of Luzon. The United States Army Forces in the Far East headed by General Douglas MacArthur was ordered to fall back to Bataan and Corregidor Island under the War Plan Orange. The American and Filipino defenders put up a stubborn resistance against Japanese forces in the Battle of Bataan, and delayed the timetable of the Japanese expansion into Southeast Asia and Australia. However, after five months of resistance with limited supplies, food, ammunition and medicine, the forces in Bataan commanded by Major General Edward P. King surrendered on April 9, 1945 to General Homma in the largest capitulation of the United States Army. 80,000 Americans and Filipinos surrendered to Japanese forces, and the Japanese committed them to the Bataan Death March, where an estimate of 15,000 died from heat, exhaustion, abuse or summary execution. The following day, units of the Japanese Army committed the Pantingan River Massacre, where 600 officers of the Philippine Army's 91st Infantry Division were summarily executed with the use of swords. Of the prisoners who survived the march and reached the POW camp at Camp O'Donnell, malnutrition, disease, mistreatment and abuse resulted in the deaths of an additional 20,000 prisoners of war.

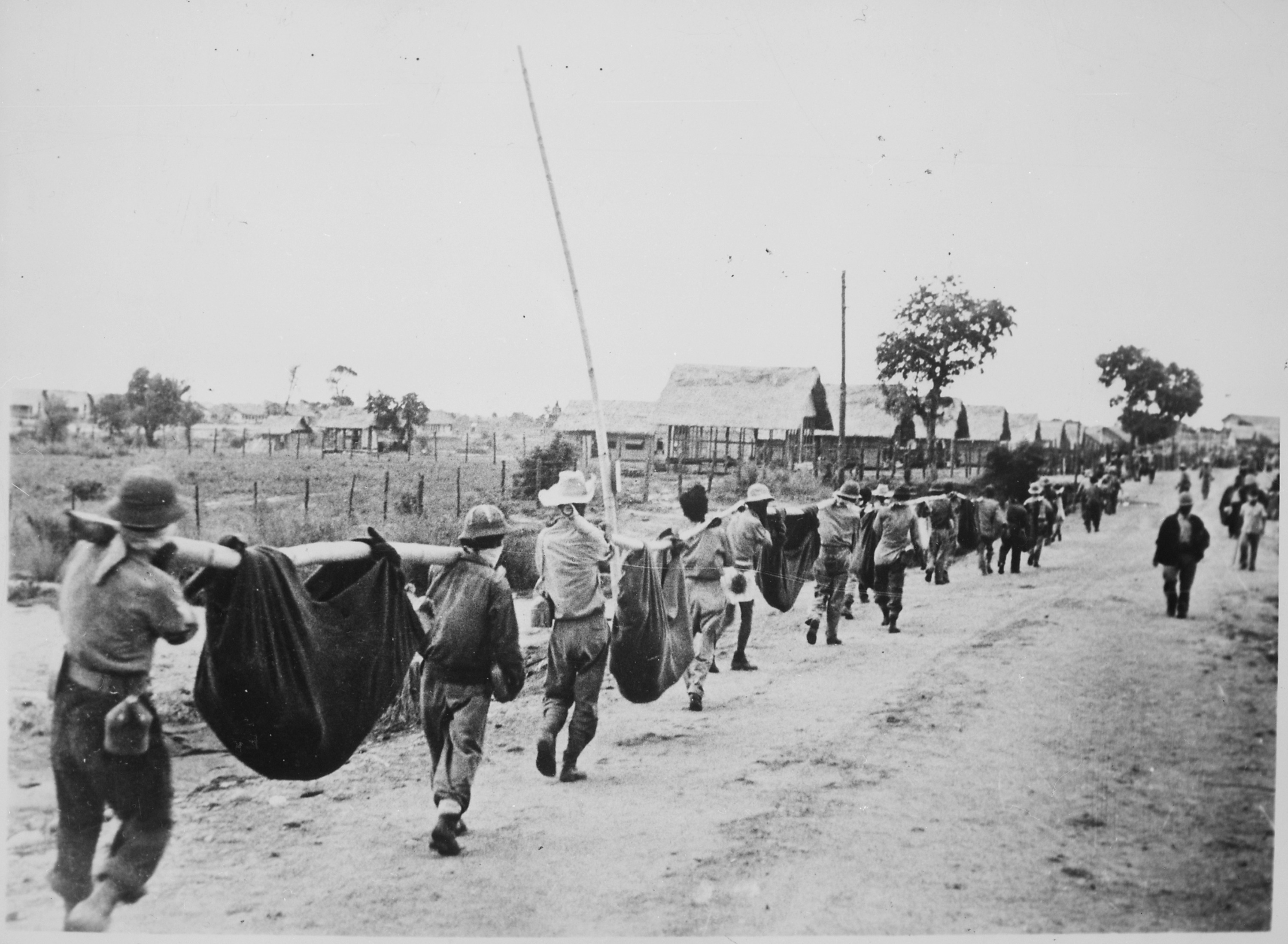
A column of American and Filipino prisoners of war carrying their fallen comrades during the Bataan Death March, March 1942

The Filipino POWs were released August 1942, while the American POWs were distributed in other POW Camps around the country and were pressed into forced labor, building airfields, railroads, bases and other civil works. Some POWs were later transported on hell ships and brought to China, Taiwan, or the home islands of Japan to be used as human shields and forced labor.

During the Japanese occupation of the Philippines, a number of atrocities were recorded against local government officials such as the execution of former Chief Justice Jose Abad Santos and the Mayor of Daet Wenceslao Vinzons. There were also a number of former military officers who were executed such as Brigadier General Vicente Lim, and the former Philippine Constabulary Intelligence Division Chief, Lieutenant Colonel Alejo Valdes, brother of the Philippine Army's Chief-of-Staff Basilio Valdes. Diplomats such as the Chinese Embassy staff were massacred and buried in the Manila Chinese Cemetery. Civilians were also not spared as the Japanese military police, the Kempeitai, subjected them to torture or summary executions without trial for suspicion of being a supporter of anti-Japanese guerilla forces, or disagreements with pro-Japanese Filipino organizations, such as the Makapili. The Japanese military also systematically forced young Filipino women and girls into sexual slavery as "comfort women". Of the four Japanese military governors of the Philippines, three were tried and convicted of war crimes. General Shizuichi Tanaka, who was the military governor of the Philippines between June 1942 and May 1943, committed suicide near the end of the war and could not be tried.

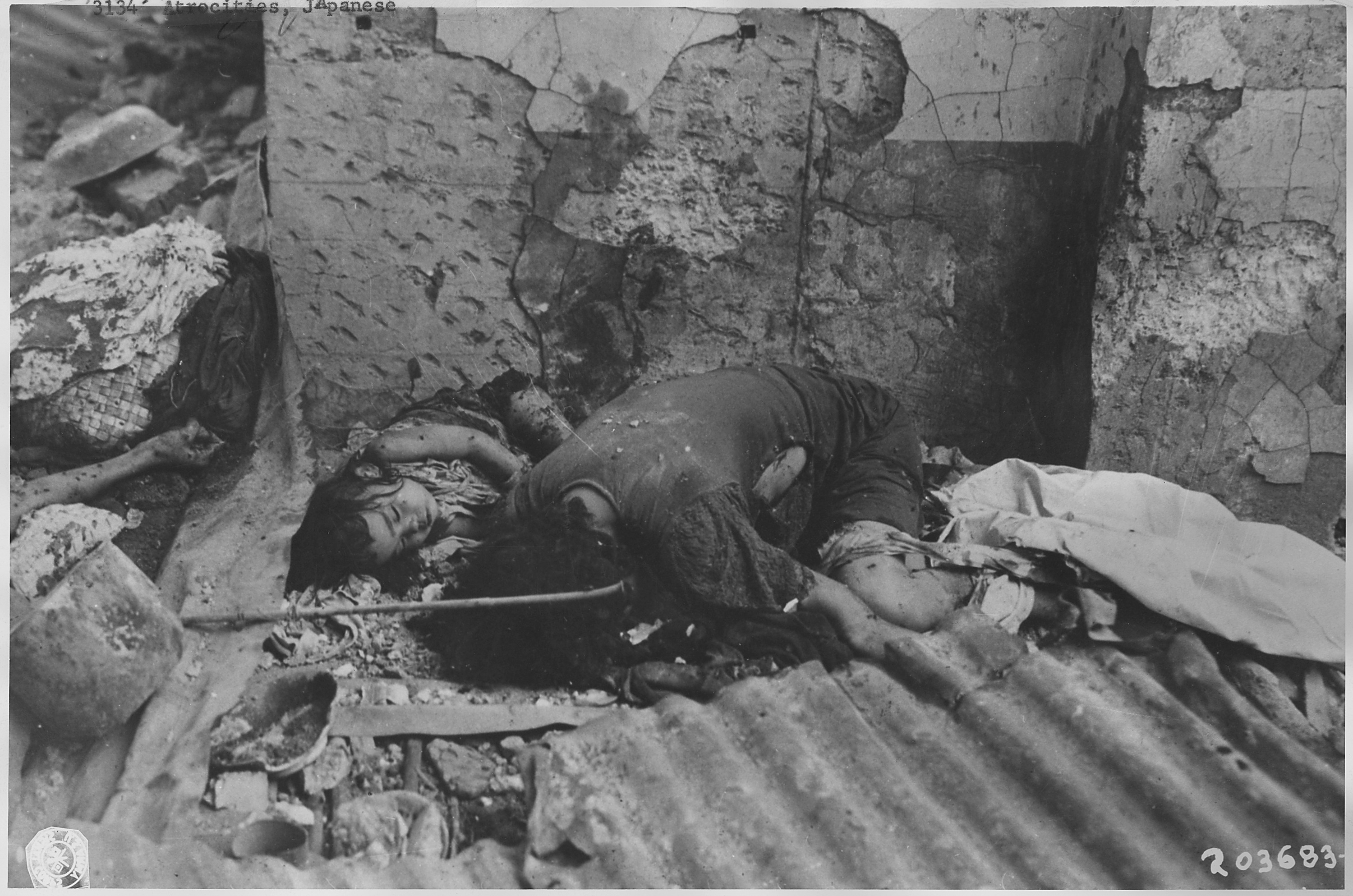
A Filipino woman and child killed in the Manila Massacre, 1945

In 1944, during the Philippines campaign, Japanese forces under the overall command of General Tomoyuki Yamashita also perpetrated attacks and massacres against the civilian population. During the battle for Manila, the Filipino capital city, Japanese soldiers committed atrocities against Filipino civilians in the Manila massacre, the total number of civilians who were killed was at least 100,000. The commander of the Japanese marines and units that committed the massacre was Rear Admiral Sanji Iwabuchi. Although Admiral Iwabuchi's marines had committed the atrocity, Yamashita was convicted as a war criminal for the Manila massacre even though Yamashita had earlier ordered Iwabuchi to evacuate Manila as he had. Iwabuchi himself escaped justice and committed suicide in the face of imminent defeat near the end of the battle.

The day after the surrender of Japan, the head of the Allied Translator and Interpreter Section, Col. Sidney Mashbir, confronted Katsuo Okazaki of the Ministry of Foreign Affairs, and presented him evidence gathered by the PWCC of the massacres that occurred in the Philippines.

Former war-crimes prosecutor and author Allan Ryan argues that there was no evidence that Yamashita committed crimes in Manila, ordered others to do so, was in a position to prevent them, or even suspected they were about to happen. The ruling against Yamashita, holding the commander responsible for subordinates' war crimes as long as the commander did not attempt to discover and stop them from occurring – came to be known as the Yamashita standard. The problem with Ryan's argument which only focused on the Manila massacre was it completely ignored the numerous war crimes and atrocities committed by Yamashita's Army soldiers outside of Manila that no Navy sailors and marines committed, making them Yamashita's responsibility. Yamashita was held responsible for numerous war crimes that the prosecution claimed was a systematic campaign to torture and kill Filipino civilians and Allied POWs as shown in the Palawan Massacre of 139 U.S. POWs, wanton executions of guerrillas, soldiers, and civilians without due process like the execution of Philippine Army general Vicente Lim, and the massacre of 25,000 civilians in Batangas Province. These crimes that were committed outside of the Manila massacre were done by the Japanese Army, not the Navy. It was argued that Yamashita was in full command of the Japanese Army's secret military police, the Kempeitai, which committed numerous war crimes on POWs and civilian internees and he simply nodded his head without protest when asked by his Kempeitai subordinates to execute people without due process or trials because there were too many prisoners to do proper trials.

World War II in the Philippines resulted in the deaths of approximately 530,000 to 1,000,000 Filipinos, mostly civilians.

== Activities ==
The Commission was headed by former Justice and future Solicitor General Manuel Lim, who also became one of the Assistant Prosecutor during the trials of generals Masaharu Homma and Tomoyuki Yamashita. Lim enlisted the help of SCAP War Crimes Investigation Section and brought in more than 100 military and legal personnel in this effort. Lim investigated more than 300 individuals and 600 cases, interviewing thousands of witnesses. The Commission should not be confused with the Commonwealth of the Philippines' National War Crimes Office in Manila, established by President Sergio Osmena in 1945. Around 1948, the convicts who had not been executed were all transferred to Filipino custody. They were released under an amnesty by Elpidio Quirino in 1953.

== Notable defendants prosecuted ==
Overall, the Commission handled the prosecution of more than 169 defendants, of whom 133 were found guilty. 25 were given the death sentence, and 16 received life imprisonment.

- General Tomoyuki Yamashita, commander of the Japanese forces during the invasion of Malaya and Battle of Singapore, nicknamed "The Tiger of Malaya". Yamashita commanded the defense of the Philippines from advancing Allied forces. Conflicting evidence was presented during his trial concerning whether Yamashita had implicitly commissioned war crimes and whether he knew of the crimes being committed. The court eventually found Yamashita guilty and he was executed in 1946.
- Lieutenant General Masaharu Homma, commander of the 14th Area Army, which invaded the Philippines. Forces under his command perpetrated the Bataan Death March. Homma later became the first Japanese military governor of the Philippines. Sentenced to death and executed by firing squad in 1946.
- Lieutenant General Shizuo Yokoyama, commanding general of the "Shimbu Group" which later became the Forty-First Army, responsible for the defense of Manila and Southern Luzon during the Battle of Luzon. Sentenced to death, but pardoned by Philippine president Elpidio Quirino and released in 1953. Died in 1961.
- Lieutenant General Akira Muto, Chief-of-Staff of General Tomoyuki Yamashita's Japanese Fourteenth Area Army. He was extradited to Tokyo to face the International Military Tribunal for the Far East, and was charged for being responsible for the torture and execution of Filipino civilians and anti-Japanese guerillas. Executed in 1948.
- Lieutenant General Hong Sa-Ik, tried under his name in Japanese "Shiyoku Kou". Commanded Japanese camps holding Allied (primarily U.S. and Filipino) prisoners of war in the Philippines, where many of the camp guards were of Korean ethnicity. Hong was held responsible for atrocities committed by Imperial Japanese Army prison guards against Allied POWs in the Philippines and executed in 1946. The highest ranking ethnic Korean to be charged with war crimes relating to the conduct of the Empire of Japan.
- Lieutenant General Shigenori Kuroda, the Japanese Governor-General from May 28, 1943, to September 26, 1944, to whom more than 2,400 civilian deaths and executions were attributed. Sentenced to life in prison, pardoned by President Quirino and released in 1952. Died later that year.
- Lieutenant General Takaji Wachi, Chief-of-Staff of General Masaharu Homma's Japanese Fourteenth Area Army. Later became the Deputy Chief of Staff of the Southern Expeditionary Army, and subsequently Chief of Staff of the 35th Army which participated in the Battle of Leyte. Convicted by a military tribunal in Yokohama for war crimes committed in the Philippines. Sentenced to six years of hard labor at Sugamo Prison. Released in 1950, died in 1978.
- Lieutenant General Takeshi Kono was charged and convicted for the deaths of 25,000-30,000 Filipino civilians on Panay Island in 1943-45. Executed in 1947.
- Lieutenant General Hikotaro Tajima was charged and convicted for ordering the deaths of 3 captured U.S. naval aviators in May 1944. Executed in 1946.
- Major General Masatoshi Fujishige was charged and convicted for the deaths of 25,000 Filipino civilians in Batangas province in 1945. Executed in 1946.
- Major General Yoshitaka Kawane, the chief transportation officer for General Masaharu Homma's Japanese Fourteenth Army, was charged and convicted for the deaths of 10,000 U.S. and Filipino POWs in the Bataan Death March and for the deaths of 25,000 Filipino POWs and 1,548 U.S. POWs in Camp O'Donnell in 1942. He was extradited to Japan and tried and convicted in the Yokohama War Crimes Trials. Executed in 1949, along with Colonel Kurataro Hirano.
