= Yamashita surrender day =

Annual Philippine public holiday

President Rodrigo Duterte declared September 3 of every year a special working public holiday in the whole Philippines commemoration of the surrender of Japanese military forces led by Army General Tomoyuki Yamashita at the end of World War II. Republic Act 11216, which makes the holiday official.
