= San Vicente de Paul Church (Manila) =

Roman Catholic church in Manila, Philippines

- Archdiocesan Shrine of Our Lady of the Miraculous Medal
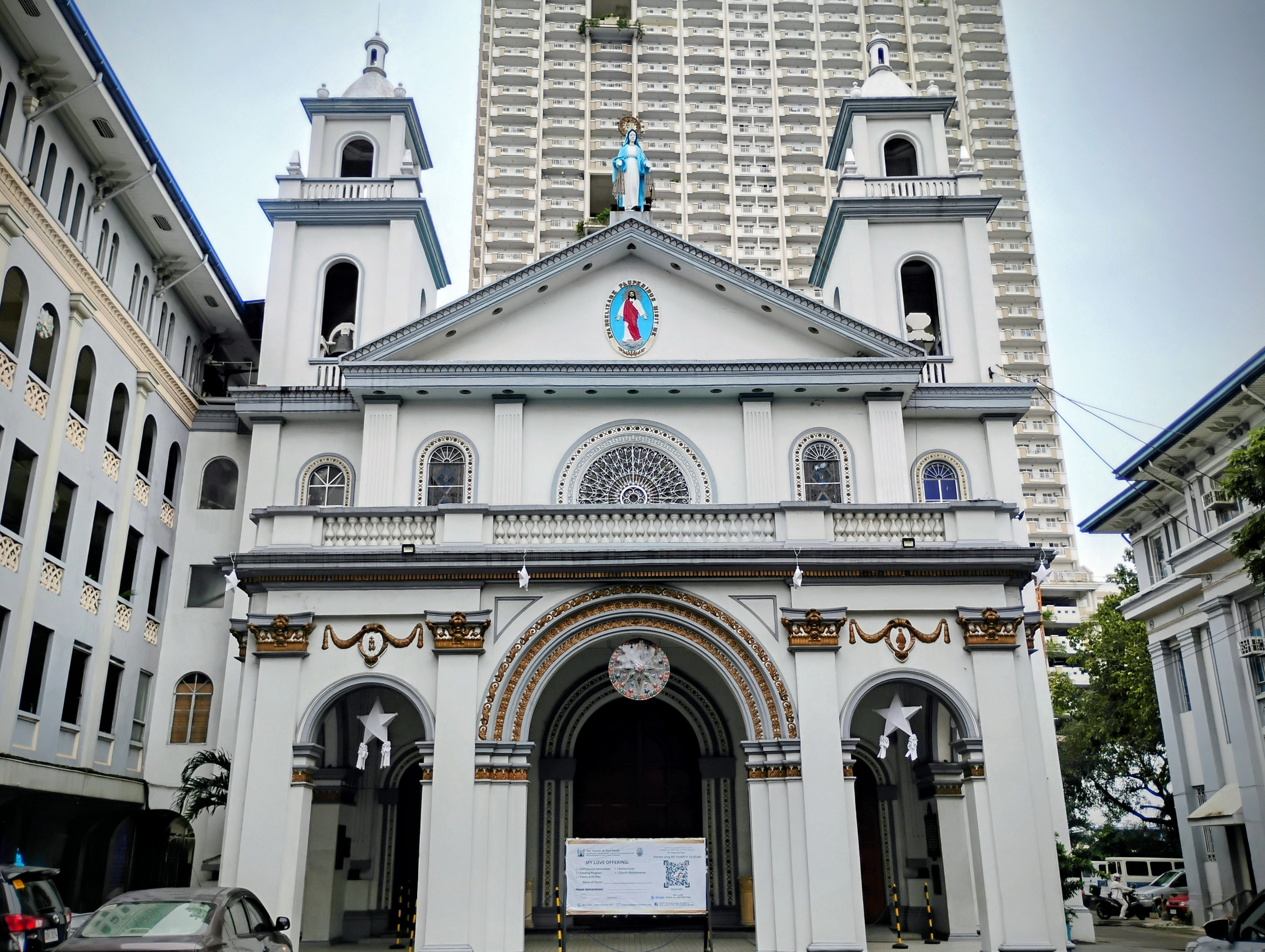
- The church's facade
- San Vicente de Paul Church
- 14°35′6.99695″N 120°59′7.82160″E
- Location: Ermita, Manila
- Country: Philippines
- Denomination: Roman Catholic

History
- Status: Parish church
- Dedication: Vincent de Paul Miraculous Medal

Architecture
- Functional status: Active
- Architectural type: Church building
- Completed: 1912; 114 years ago

Administration
- Archdiocese: Manila

Clergy
- Rector: Joel dL. Rescober, CM
- Vicar(s): Danilo Carolino, CM; Flaviano Caintic, CM

San Vicente de Paul Church, also known as the Archdiocesan Shrine of Our Lady of the Miraculous Medal, is a Roman Catholic church located in Ermita, Manila, Philippines.

The church was built in 1912. The Historical Research and Markers Committee listed it as a historic site by installing a historical marker in 1935.

During the World War II, the church was badly damaged during the Battle of Manila in 1945, but the records were spared. The damaged dome, belfries and roof were restored a year later.

== Gallery ==
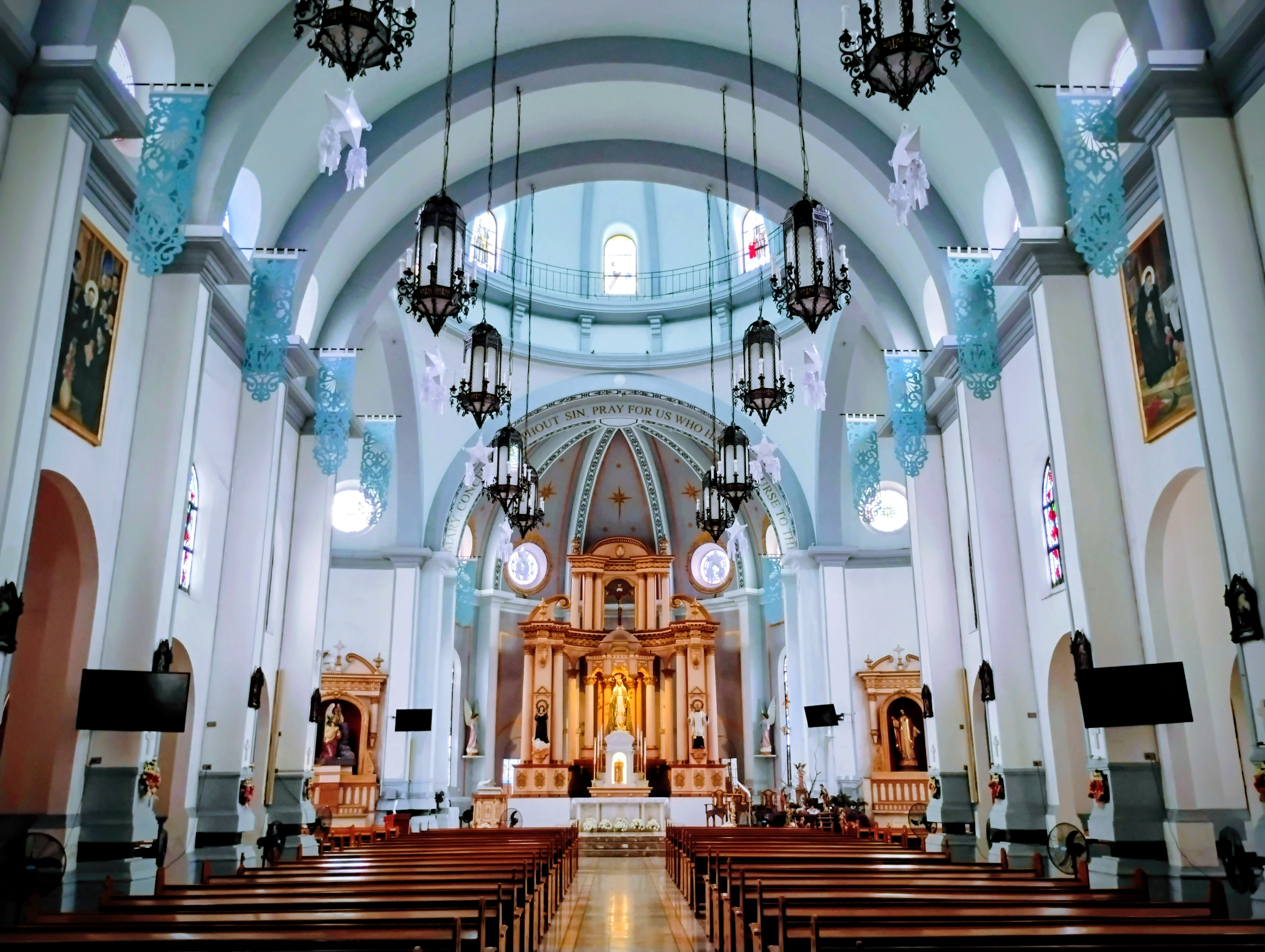
Interior of the church

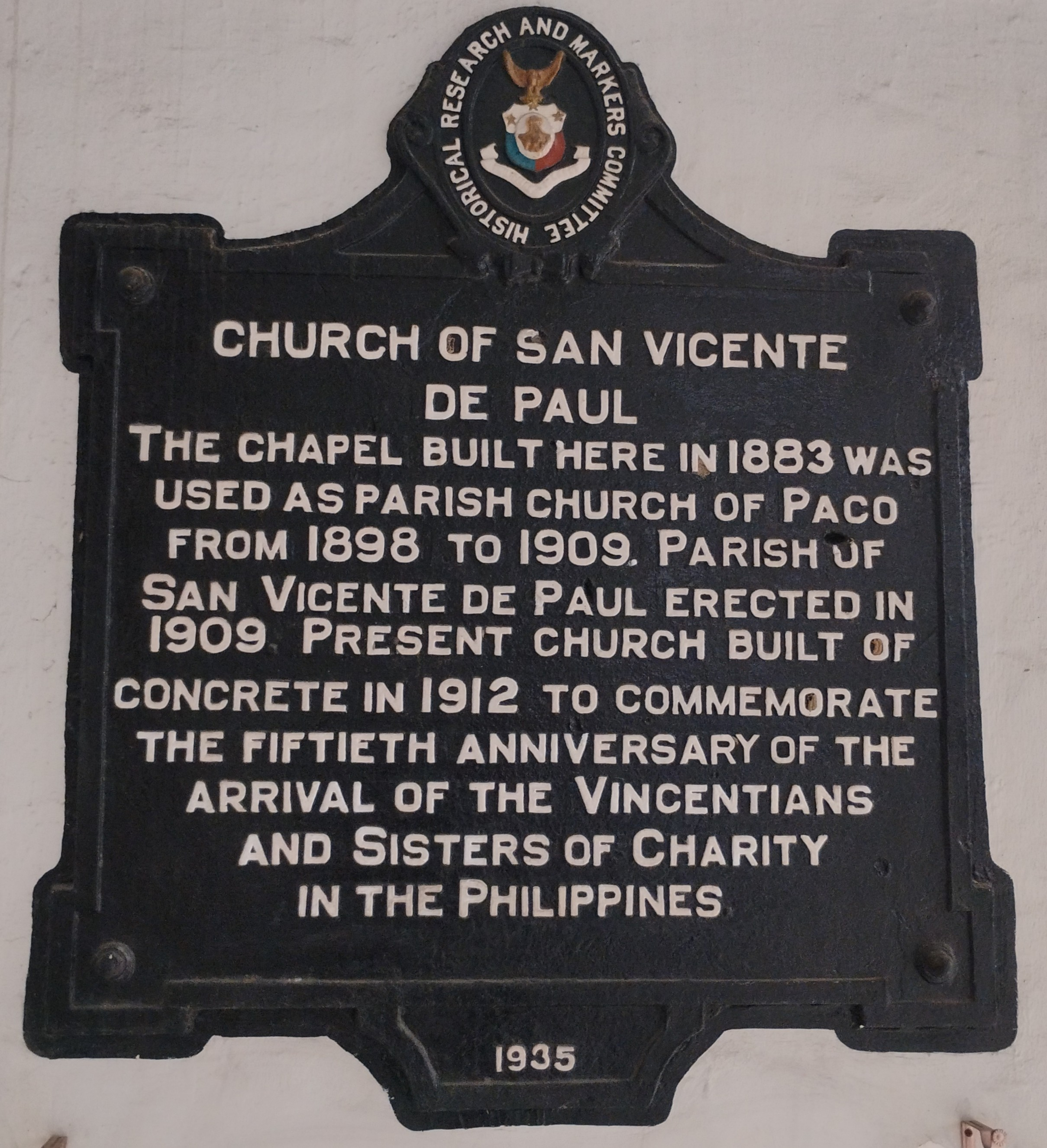
Historical marker
