= Sanji Iwabuchi =

Imperial Japanese Navy vice admiral (1895–1945)

- 岩淵 三次
- Born: 2 March 1895; Sanjō, Niigata, Japan
- Died: 26 February 1945 (aged 49); Intramuros, Manila, Philippines
- Education: Imperial Japanese Naval Academy; Naval Artillery School; Torpedo Warfare School
- Military career
- Allegiance: Empire of Japan
- Branch: Imperial Japanese Navy
- Service years: 1915–1945
- Rank: Vice admiral (posthumous)
- Units: Iwate, Nisshin, Umikaze, Yokosuka Air Group, Ōi, Abukuma, Chōkai, Hiei, Kure Naval District, Akitsushima, Combined Fleet, 11th Air Fleet, 3rd Southern Escort Fleet
- Commands: Kure Guard Squadron, Kamoi, Kashii, Kirishima, Chief of Personnel (Maizuru Naval District), 31st Naval Base Force
- Conflicts: World War II; Pacific War; Battle of Midway; Guadalcanal campaign; Battle of the Eastern Solomons; Battle of the Santa Cruz Islands; Naval Battle of Guadalcanal; Philippines campaign; Battle of Manila ‡‡

Sanji Iwabuchi (岩淵 三次, Iwabuchi Sanji; 2 March 1895 – 26 February 1945) was a rear admiral in the Imperial Japanese Navy during the Pacific War of World War II. He committed suicide after facing imminent defeat during the Battle of Manila. Units under his command committed the Manila massacre.

== Life and career ==
Iwabuchi was a native of what is now part of the city of Sanjō, Niigata Prefecture. He graduated from the 43rd class of the Imperial Japanese Naval Academy in December 1915, ranking 13th out of 96 cadets, and on graduation continued on to Naval Artillery School to become a specialist in that field. He served as a midshipman on the cruiser Iwate, which made a long-distance navigational training voyage to Hong Kong, Singapore, Australia, New Zealand and the South Seas Mandate in 1915. As an ensign in 1918, he was assigned to the cruiser Nisshin and as a first lieutenant he was assigned to the destroyer Umikaze in 1919. In 1920, after completion of Torpedo Warfare School, he was assigned to the Yokosuka Air Group until the end of 1922.

In the 1930s, Iwabuchi served as chief gunnery officer on a number of vessels, including the cruisers Ōi in 1930, Abukuma in 1931, and Chōkai in 1932, and the battleship Hiei in 1933. In 1934–1935, he was assigned to Kure Naval District and was in charge of coastal artillery.

Iwabuchi was promoted to captain in December 1937, and was given command of the seaplane tender Kamoi in March 1938. In August was assigned to Naval General Staff and Ministry of Navy to April 1941, when he was assigned command of the training vessel Kashii.

=== World War II ===
At the time of the attack on Pearl Harbor in 1941, Iwabuchi was equipment officer of the seaplane tender Akitsushima. He was reassigned to the staff of the Combined Fleet on 25 March 1942, and was subsequently given command of the battleship Kirishima on 20 April. He commanded Kirishima in the Battle of Midway in June 1942, but Kirishima was sunk by the American battleship USS Washington in the Second Naval Battle of Guadalcanal on 15 November of the same year. A week later, on 22 November, Iwabuchi was reassigned to staff of the 11th Air Fleet in charge of air operations over Guadalcanal and Rabaul.

Iwabuchi returned to the Yokosuka Naval District on 10 February 1943, and was promoted to rear admiral on 1 May. On 5 May, he was assigned to the Personnel and Recruiting Department at Maizuru Naval District. This would normally have been a dead-end position to his career; however, the increasingly desperate war situation provided Iwabuchi with a final opportunity. On 1 November 1944, he was assigned of the 3rd Southern Escort Fleet and on 17, assumed command of the 31st Naval Base Force, and ordered to the Philippines, which were then under impending threat of Allied invasion. Iwabuchi was assigned command of the Manila Naval Defense Force in defenses of the city.

Once American forces had landed on Luzon and had begun converging on Manila, welcomed and assisted by Filipino troops of the Philippine Commonwealth Army and Philippine Constabulary, the Japanese supreme commander for operations in the Philippines, General Tomoyuki Yamashita gave Iwabuchi a direct order to withdraw from Manila without combat. Yamashita wanted to consolidate his forces, and to avoid being trapped in urban warfare in downtown Manila with close to a million civilians. However, Iwabuchi repeatedly refused to obey orders. Citing shame at having lost Kirishima, Iwabuchi saw that he could redeem himself only by holding his position to the death.

Together with the under-equipped and ill-disciplined 15,000 naval troops and 4,000 Imperial Japanese Army stragglers under his command, he found several good defensive positions in the historic Intramuros area of the old city of Manila, including the massive walls of colonial Fort Santiago. During the Allied artillery bombardment of Iwabuchi's positions, thousands of civilians were killed. Thousands more were killed in the crossfire, and thousands were killed by Japanese forces in reprisal for the Allied attacks in what came to be called the "Manila Massacre". After many days of building-to-building combat, more than 16,000 Japanese defenders were killed, and some time after 26 February Iwabuchi committed ritual suicide at the Agriculture Building, although in older sources say he committed suicide by pistol.

He was posthumously promoted to vice admiral.

== Portrayal ==
Eddie Garcia portrayed Admiral Iwabuchi in the 1968 film Manila, Open City.
