= Tomoyuki Yamashita =

Japanese officer and war criminal (1885–1946)

- 山下 奉文
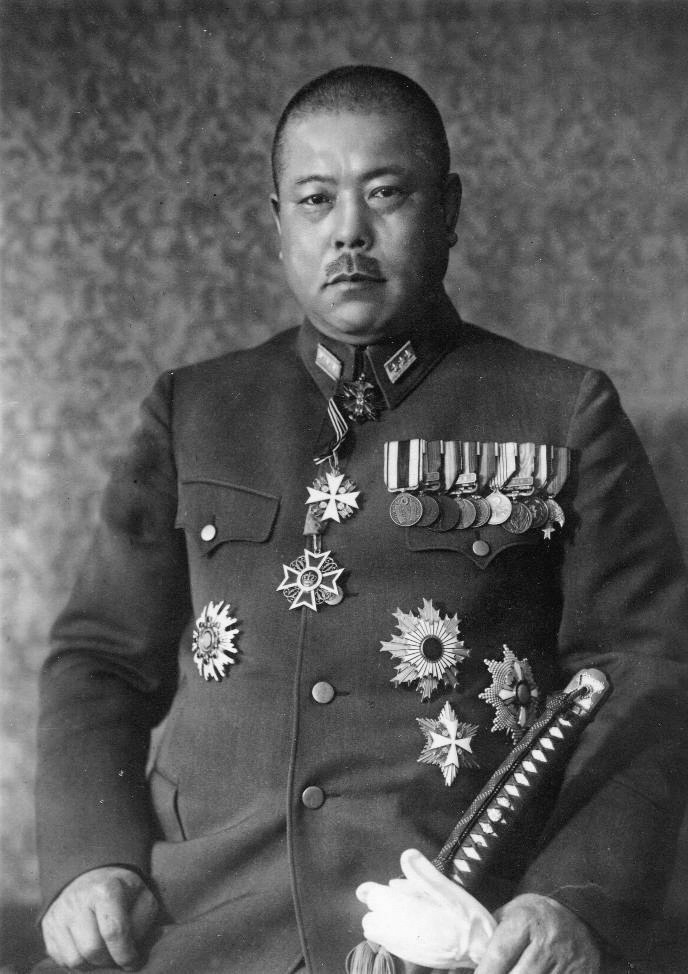

Military Governor of Japan to the Philippines
- In office 26 September 1944 – 2 September 1945
- Monarch: Emperor Shōwa
- Preceded by: Shigenori Kuroda
- Succeeded by: Position abolished

Personal details
- Born: 8 November 1885 Ōtoyo, Kōchi, Japan
- Died: 23 February 1946 (aged 60) Los Baños, Laguna, Philippines, U.S.
- Cause of death: Execution by hanging
- Resting place: Tama Reien Cemetery, Fuchū, Tokyo, Japan
- Education: Imperial Japanese Army Academy
- Awards: Order of the Golden Kite; Order of the Rising Sun; Order of the Sacred Treasure; Order of the German Eagle
- Nickname(s): Tiger of Malaya; The Beast of Bataan

Military service
- Allegiance: Japan
- Branch/service: Imperial Japanese Army
- Years of service: 1905–1945
- Rank: General
- Commands: 25th Army; 1st Area Army; 14th Area Army
- Battles/wars: World War I; Asian and Pacific theatre; Battle of Tsingtao; World War II; Second Sino-Japanese War; Malayan campaign; Battle of Singapore; Philippines campaign

Japanese name
- Kanji: 山下 奉文
- Kana: やました ともゆき
Transcriptions
- Romanization: Yamashita Tomoyuki

Tomoyuki Yamashita (山下 奉文, Yamashita Tomoyuki; 8 November 1885 – 23 February 1946; also called Tomobumi Yamashita) was a general in the Imperial Japanese Army during World War II. Yamashita led Japanese forces during the invasion of Malaya and Battle of Singapore. His conquest of Malaya and Singapore in 70 days earned him the sobriquet "The Tiger of Malaya". He was assigned to defend the Philippines from the advancing Allies later in the war. Although he was unable to prevent the superior Allied forces from advancing, despite dwindling supplies and Allied guerrilla action, he was able to hold on to part of Luzon until after the formal surrender of Japan in August 1945.

Under Yamashita's command, at least 350,000 to 450,000 were killed. Yamashita was in overall command during the Sook Ching massacre, the Rape of Manila, and other atrocities. After the war, Yamashita was tried for war crimes committed by troops under his command during the Japanese defense of the occupied Philippines in 1944. Yamashita denied ordering those war crimes and said that he did not have knowledge that they occurred. Conflicting evidence was presented during the trial concerning whether Yamashita had implicitly affirmed commission of these crimes in his orders and whether he knew of the crimes being committed. The court eventually found Yamashita guilty and he was executed in February, 1946. The ruling against Yamashita – holding the commander responsible for subordinates' war crimes as long as the commander did not attempt to discover and stop them from occurring – came to be known as the Yamashita standard.

== Biography ==
Yamashita was the second son of a local physician in Osugi, a village in what is now part of Ōtoyo, Kōchi Prefecture, Shikoku. He attended military preparatory schools in his youth.

=== Early military career ===
In November 1905, Yamashita graduated from the 18th class of the Imperial Japanese Army Academy. He was ranked 16th out of 920 cadets. In December 1908 he was promoted to lieutenant and fought against the German Empire in World War I in Shandong, China in 1914. In May 1916 he was promoted to captain. He attended the 28th class of the Army War College, graduating sixth in his class in 1916. The same year, he married Hisako Nagayama, daughter of retired Gen. Nagayama. Yamashita became an expert on Germany, serving as assistant military attaché at Bern and Berlin from 1919 to 1922.

In February 1922, he was promoted to major. He twice served in the Military Affairs Bureau of the War Ministry responsible for the Ugaki Army Reduction Program, aimed at reforming the Japanese army by streamlining its organisation despite facing fierce opposition from factions within the Army.

In 1922, upon his return to Japan, Major Yamashita served in the Imperial Headquarters and the Staff College, receiving promotion to lieutenant-colonel in August 1925. While posted to the Imperial Japanese Army General Staff, Yamashita unsuccessfully promoted a military reduction plan. Despite his ability, Yamashita fell into disfavor as a result of his involvement with political factions within the Japanese military.

As a leading member of the "Imperial Way" group, he became a rival to Hideki Tojo and other members of the "Control Faction". In 1927 Yamashita was posted to Vienna, Austria, as a military attaché until 1930. He was then promoted to the rank of colonel. In 1930 Col. Yamashita was given command of the elite 3rd Imperial Infantry Regiment (Imperial Guards Division). He was promoted to major-general in August 1934.

After the February 26 Incident of 1936, he fell into disfavor with Emperor Hirohito due to his appeal for leniency toward rebel officers involved in the attempted coup. He realized that he had lost the trust of the Emperor and decided to resign from the Army—a decision that his superiors dissuaded him from carrying out. He was eventually relegated to a post in Korea, being given command of a brigade. Akashi Yoji argued in his article "General Yamashita Tomoyuki: Commander of the Twenty-Fifth Army" that his time in Korea gave him the chance to reflect on his conduct during the 1936 coup and at the same time study Zen Buddhism, something which caused him to mellow in character yet instilled a high level of discipline.

Yamashita was promoted to lieutenant-general in November 1937. He insisted that Japan should end the conflict with China and keep peaceful relations with the United States and Great Britain, but he was ignored and subsequently assigned to an unimportant post in the Kwantung Army.

From 1938 to 1940, he was assigned to command the IJA 4th Division which saw some action in northern China against insurgents fighting the occupying Japanese armies. In December 1940 Yamashita was sent on a six-month clandestine military mission to Germany (meeting Adolf Hitler in Berlin on 16 June 1941) and Italy, meeting Benito Mussolini.

Throughout his time in the military, Yamashita had consistently urged the implementation of his proposals, which included "streamlining the air arm, to mechanize the Army, to integrate control of the armed forces in a defense ministry coordinated by a chairman of Joint Chiefs of Staff, to create a paratroop corps and to employ effective propaganda".

Such strategies caused much friction between himself and Gen. Hideki Tojo, the war minister, who was not keen on implementing these proposals.

=== World War II ===
==== Malaya and Singapore ====
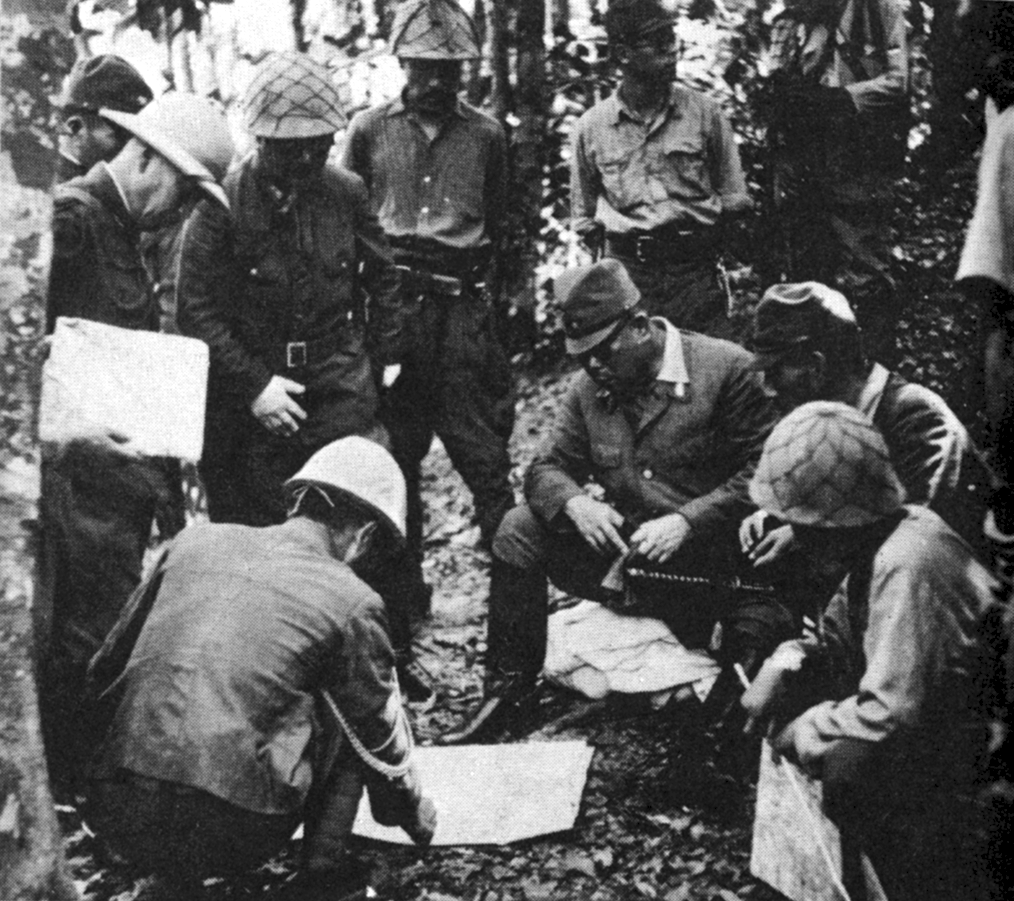
General Yamashita planning an assault by Japanese troops in Malaya

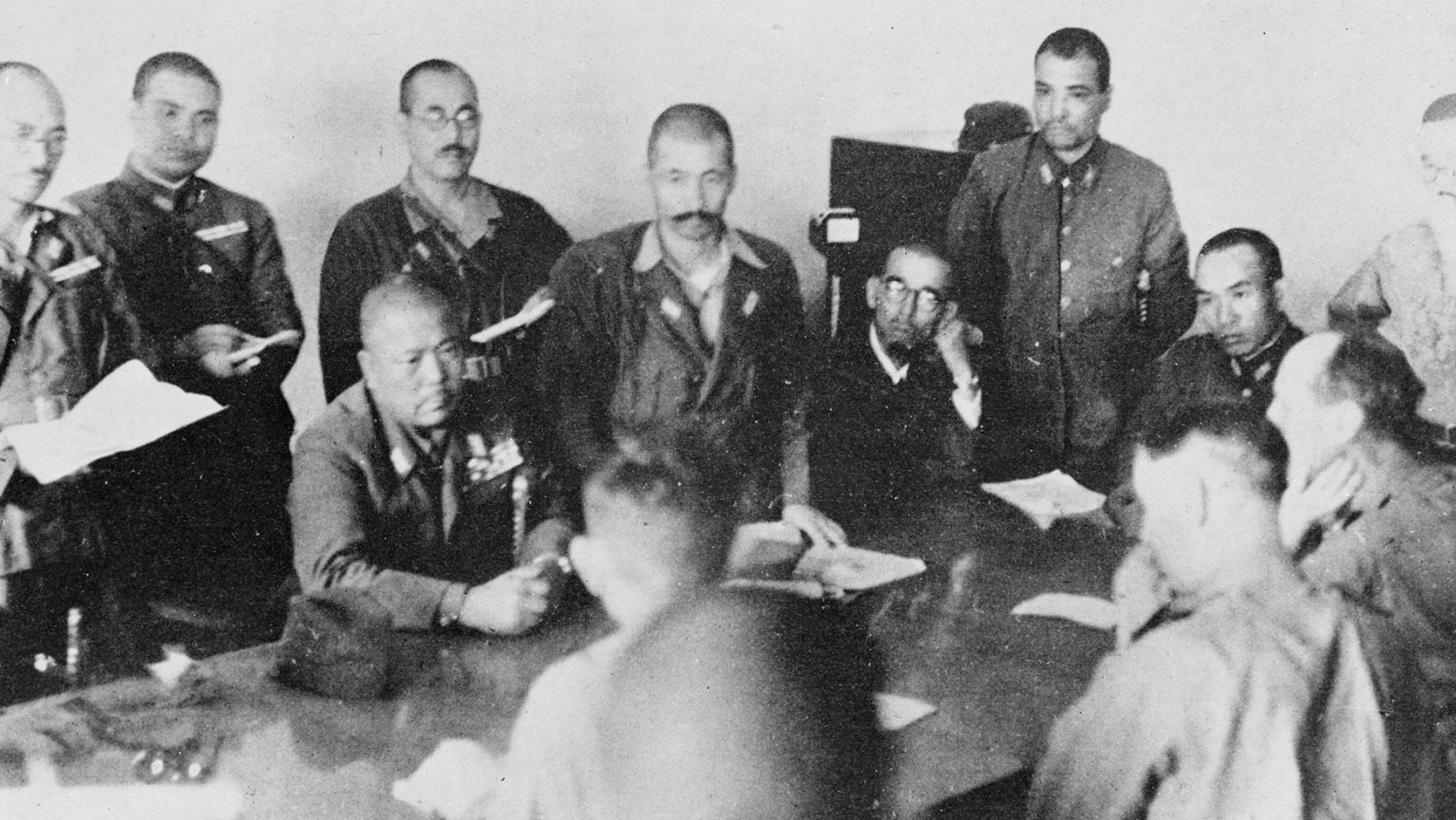
Lt. Gen. Yamashita (seated, center) accepting the unconditional surrender of Singapore from Lt. Gen. Percival, seated between his officers.

On 6 November 1941 Lt. Gen. Yamashita was put in command of the Twenty-Fifth Army. It was his belief that victory in Malaya would be successful only if his troops could make an amphibious landing—something that was dependent on whether he would have enough air and naval support to provide a good landing site.

On 8 December he launched an invasion of Malaya from bases in French Indochina. Yamashita remarked that only a "driving charge" would ensure victory in Malaya. This is because the Japanese force was about one-third as large as the opposing British forces in Malaya and Singapore. The plan was to conquer Malaya and Singapore as quickly as possible in order to overcome any numerical disadvantage and minimize any potential losses from a long, drawn-out battle.

The Malayan campaign concluded with the fall of Singapore on 15 February 1942, in which Yamashita's 30,000 front-line soldiers captured 80,000 British, Indian and Australian troops, the largest surrender of British-led personnel in history. This victory earned him the sobriquet "Tiger of Malaya".

The campaign and the subsequent Japanese occupation of Singapore included war crimes committed against captive Allied personnel and civilians, such as the Alexandra Hospital and Sook Ching massacres. Yamashita's culpability for these events remains a matter of controversy as some argued that he had failed to prevent them. The order to execute 50,000 Chinese came, according to postwar testimony, from senior officers within Yamashita's Operations staff. Yamashita's troops had fought in China, where it was customary to conduct massacres to subdue the population. Major Ōnishi Satoru, one of the accused in the postwar trial, affirmed that he acted under a specific order issued from General Headquarters, that read, 'Due to the fact that the army is advancing fast and in order to preserve peace behind us it is essential to massacre as many Chinese as possible who appear in any way to have anti-Japanese feelings.'

Yamashita later apologized to the few survivors of the 650 bayoneted or shot at Alexandra Hospital, and allegedly some soldiers caught looting in the aftermath of the slaughter were executed. Akashi Yoji claims that this would have been in line with Yamashita's personality and belief. According to him, the first orders given by Yamashita to the soldiers was "no looting; no rape; no arson", and that any soldier committing such acts would be severely punished and his superior held accountable.

Nevertheless, Yamashita's warnings to his troops were generally not heeded, and wanton acts of violence were reported. In his article, Akashi argued that the main issue was that despite being an excellent tactician and leader, his personal ideals constantly placed him at odds with the General Staff and War Ministry. His humane treatment of prisoners of war as well as British leaders was something the other officers had difficulty coming to terms with.

Despite the finger of blame for the Sook Ching Massacre being pointed at Yamashita, it is now argued that he had no direct part in it, and his subordinates were the ones behind the incident. A study by Ian Ward concluded that Yamashita should not be held responsible for the Sook Ching Massacre, but Ward did hold him responsible "for failing to guard against Tsuji's manipulation of Command affairs".

==== Manchukuo ====
On 17 July 1942, Yamashita was reassigned from Singapore to far-away Manchukuo again, having been given a post in commanding the First Area Army, and was effectively sidelined for a major part of the Pacific War. It is thought that Tojo, by then the Prime Minister, was responsible for his banishment, taking advantage of Yamashita's gaffe during a speech made to Singaporean civilian leaders in early 1942, when he referred to the local populace as "citizens of the Empire of Japan" (this was considered embarrassing for the Japanese government, who officially did not consider the residents of occupied territories to have the rights or privileges of Japanese citizenship). He was promoted to full general in February 1943. Some have suggested that he may have been sent there to prepare for an attack upon the Soviet Union in the event that Stalingrad fell to Germany.

==== Philippines ====
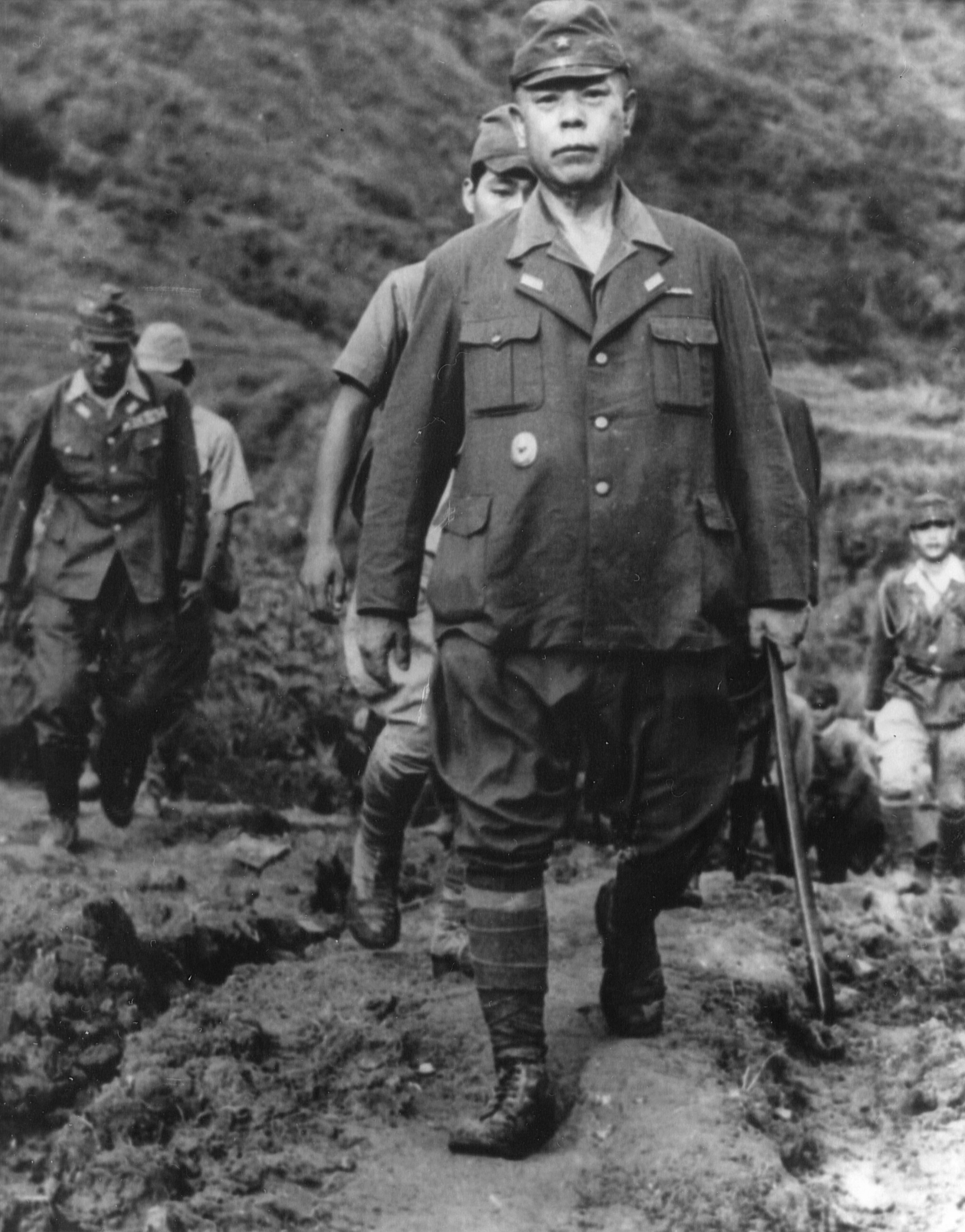
General Yamashita and his staff surrender on 2 September 1945

On 26 September 1944, when the war situation was critical for Japan, Yamashita was rescued from his enforced exile in China by the new Japanese government after the downfall of Hideki Tōjō and his cabinet, and he assumed the command of the Fourteenth Area Army to defend the occupied Philippines on 10 October. U.S. forces landed on Leyte ten days later. On 6 January 1945, the Sixth U.S. Army, totaling 200,000 men, landed at Lingayen Gulf in Luzon.

Yamashita commanded approximately 262,000 troops in three defensive groups; the largest, the Shobu Group, under his personal command numbered 152,000 troops, defended northern Luzon. The smallest group, totaling 30,000 troops, known as the Kembu Group, under the command of Rikichi Tsukada, defended Bataan and the western shores. The last group, the Shimbu Group, totaling 80,000 men under the command of Shizuo Yokoyama, defended Manila and southern Luzon. Yamashita tried to rebuild his army but was forced to retreat from Manila to the Sierra Madre mountains of northern Luzon, as well as the Cordillera Central mountains. Yamashita ordered all troops, except those given the task of ensuring security, out of the city.

Yamashita did not declare Manila an open city as General Douglas MacArthur had done in December 1941 before its capture. When a military commander or political leader formally declares an open city, this means that the defending military will not defend the city in battle and the victorious forces can enter unopposed. Open city declarations are made in order to save civilian lives and to prevent destruction of buildings. Because Yamashita, who also served as the governor-general and military governor of the Philippines, did not declare Manila an open city while he evacuated most of his soldiers northward, Imperial Japanese Navy (IJN) Rear Admiral Sanji Iwabuchi re-occupied Manila with 16,000 sailors, with the intent of destroying all port facilities and naval storehouses. Once there, Iwabuchi took command of the 3,750 Army security troops, and against Yamashita's specific order, turned the city into a battlefield. The battle and the Japanese atrocities resulted in the deaths of more than 100,000 Filipino civilians, in what is known as the Manila massacre, during the fierce street fighting for the capital which raged between 4 February and 3 March.

Yamashita continued to employ delaying tactics to maintain his army in Kiangan (part of the Ifugao Province), until 2 September 1945, the day of the formal surrender of Japan to General Douglas MacArthur. At the time of his surrender, to Major General Robert S. Beightler, Yamashita's forces had been reduced to under 50,000 by the lack of supplies and tough campaigning by elements of the combined American and Filipino soldiers including the recognized guerrillas.

== Trial ==
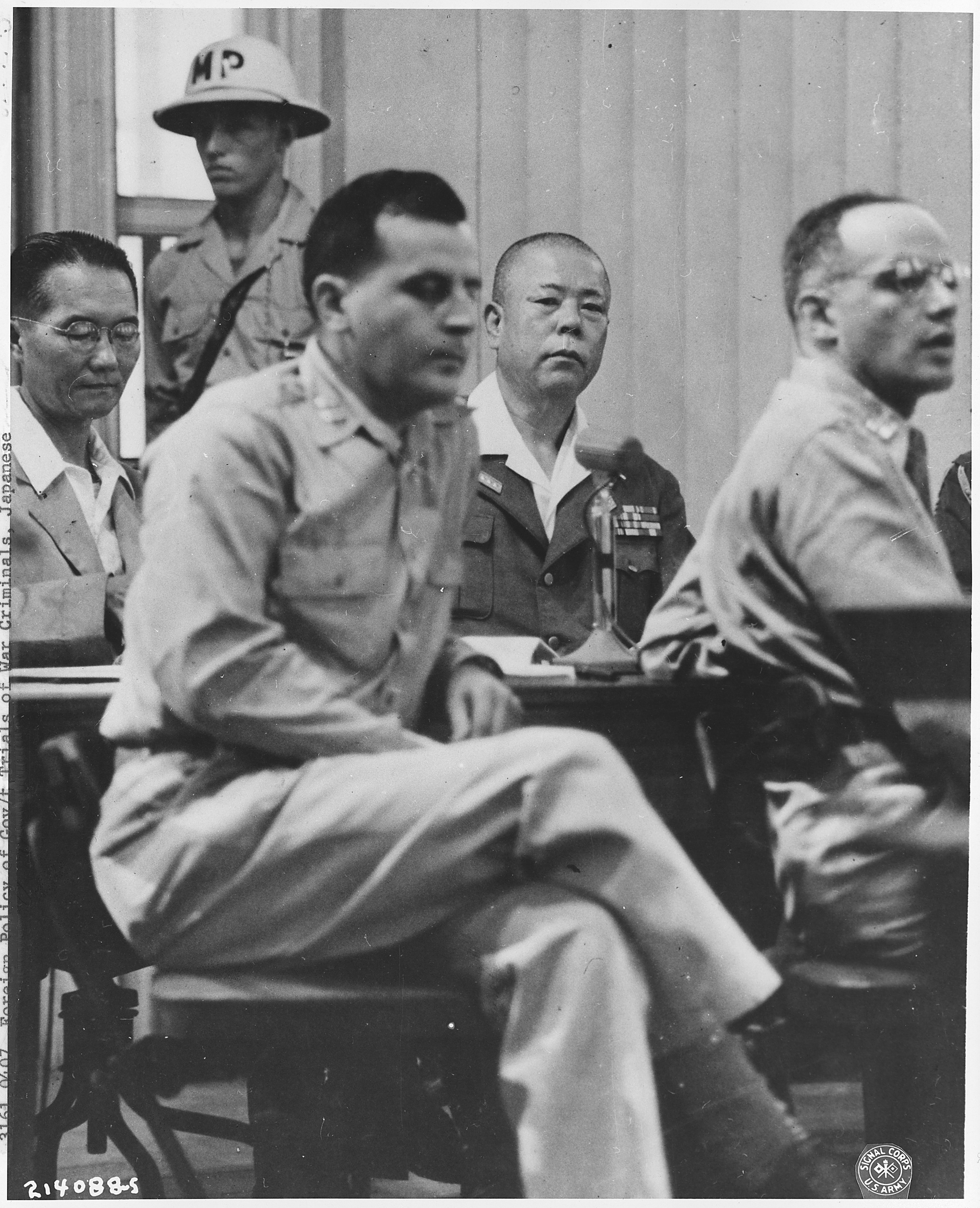
Yamashita (second from right) at his trial in Manila, November 1945

From 29 October to 7 December 1945, an American military tribunal in Manila tried General Yamashita for war crimes relating to the Manila massacre and many atrocities in the Philippines against civilians and prisoners of war, and sentenced him to death. Yamashita was held responsible for numerous war crimes that the prosecution claimed was a systematic campaign to torture and kill Filipino civilians and Allied POWs as shown in the Palawan Massacre of 139 U.S. POWs, wanton executions of guerrillas, soldiers, and civilians without due process like the execution of Philippine Army general Vicente Lim, and the massacre of 25,000 civilians in Batangas Province. These crimes that were committed outside of the Manila massacre were done by the Imperial Japanese Army, not the Imperial Japanese Navy. It was argued that Yamashita was in full command of the Imperial Japanese Army's secret military police, the Kempeitai, which committed numerous war crimes on POWs and civilian internees and he simply nodded his head without protest when asked by his Kempeitai subordinates to execute people without due process or trials because there were too many prisoners to do proper trials. This controversial case has become a precedent regarding the command responsibility for war crimes and is known as the Yamashita Standard.

The principal accusation against Yamashita was that he had failed in his duty as commander of Japanese forces in the Philippines to prevent them from committing atrocities. The defense acknowledged that atrocities had been committed but contended that the breakdown of communications and the Japanese chain of command in the chaotic battle of the second Philippines campaign was such that Yamashita could not have controlled his troops even if he had known of their actions, which was not certain in any case; furthermore, many of the atrocities had been committed by Japanese naval forces outside his command. The prosecution countered by presenting testimony (some of it hearsay) from multiple individuals indicating that the orders had come from Yamashita. One such hearsay statement alleged that Yamashita had told General Artemio Ricarte to "wipe out the whole Philippines... since everyone in the Islands were either guerrillas or active supporters of the guerrillas." Another piece of testimony alleging that Yamashita had made similar statements to Ricarte through translation by the latter's grandson, was refuted by the grandson who denied ever having translated such a statement. However, some firsthand evidence was presented that Yamashita ordered or agreed with proposed orders that trials be foregone for suspected guerrillas and punishments handled directly by military tribunal officers following cursory investigations.

American lawyer Harry E. Clarke Sr., a colonel in the United States Army at the time, served as the chief counsel for the defense. In his opening statement, Clarke asserted:

The Accused is not charged with having done something or having failed to do something, but solely with having been something...American jurisprudence recognizes no such principle so far as its own military personnel are concerned...No one would even suggest that the Commanding General of an American occupational force becomes a criminal every time an American soldier violates the law...one man is not held to answer for the crime of another.

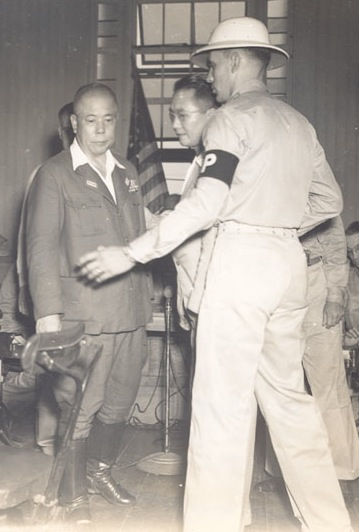
Yamashita is removed from the courtroom by military police immediately after hearing the verdict of death by hanging

For his part Yamashita denied he had knowledge of the crimes committed by his men, and claimed that he would have harshly punished them if he had had that knowledge. Further, he argued that with an army as large as his, there was no way for him to control all actions by all his subordinates. As such he felt what he was really being charged with was losing the war:

My command was as big as MacArthur's or Lord Louis Mountbatten's. How could I tell if some of my soldiers misbehaved themselves? It was impossible for any man in my position to control every action of his subordinate commanders, let alone the deeds of individual soldiers. The charges are completely new to me. If they had happened, and I had known about them, I would have punished the wrongdoers severely. But in war someone has to lose. What I am really being charged with is losing the war. It could have happened to General MacArthur, you know.

The court found Yamashita guilty as charged and sentenced him to death. Clarke appealed the sentence to General MacArthur, who upheld it. He then appealed to the Supreme Court of the Philippines and the Supreme Court of the United States, both of which declined to review the verdict. President Truman denied Yamashita's petition to grant clemency and let the decision stand.

In dissent from the Supreme Court of the United States' majority, Justice W.B. Rutledge wrote:

More is at stake than General Yamashita's fate. There could be no possible sympathy for him if he is guilty of the atrocities for which his death is sought. But there can be and should be justice administered according to the law. ... It is not too early, it is never too early, for the nation steadfastly to follow its great constitutional traditions, none older or more universally protective against unbridled power than due process of law in the trial and punishment of men, that is, of all men, whether citizens, aliens, alien enemies or enemy belligerents.

— W.B. Rutledge

The legitimacy of the hasty trial was questioned at the time, including by Justice Frank Murphy, who protested various procedural issues, the inclusion of hearsay evidence, and the general lack of professional conduct by the prosecuting officers. Evidence that Yamashita did not have ultimate command responsibility over all military units in the Philippines was not admitted in court.

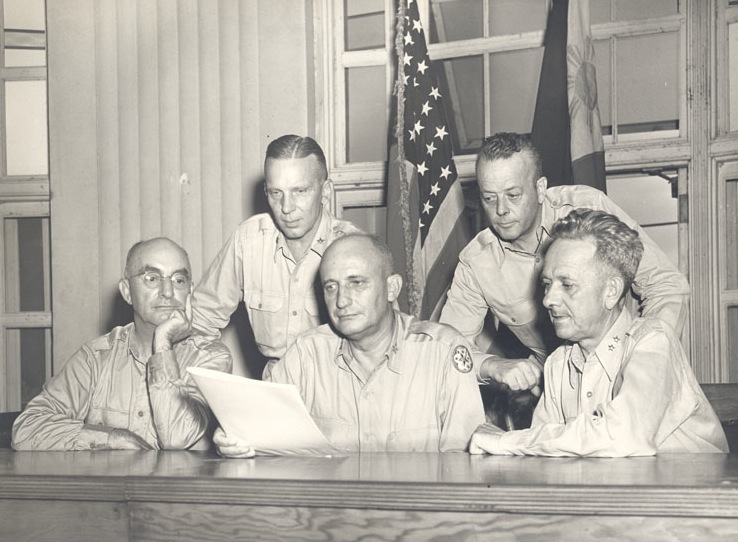
The Yamashita Trial Commission. From left to right: Major General Leo Donovan, Brigadier General Morris C. Harwerk, Major General Russel B. Reynolds, Brigadier General Egbert F. Bullens, and Major General James A. Lester

Former war crimes prosecutor Allan A. Ryan has argued that by order of General MacArthur and five other generals, and the Supreme Court of the United States, Yamashita was executed for what his soldiers did without his approval or even prior knowledge. The two dissenting Supreme Court Justices called the entire trial a miscarriage of justice, an exercise in vengeance, and a denial of human rights.

=== Execution ===
Following the Supreme Court decision, an appeal for clemency was made to U.S. President Harry S. Truman, who declined to intervene and left the matter entirely in the hands of the military authorities. In due course, General MacArthur confirmed the sentence of the commission.

On 23 February 1946, Yamashita was hanged at Los Baños, Laguna Prison Camp, 30 miles (48 km) south of Manila. After climbing the thirteen steps leading to the gallows, he was asked if he had a final statement. The Arizona Republic alleges that his reply, through a translator, was thus:

As I said in the Manila Supreme Court that I have done with my all capacity, so I don't ashame [sic] in front of the gods for what I have done when I have died. But if you say to me 'you do not have any ability to command the Japanese Army' I should say nothing for it, because it is my own nature. Now, our war criminal trial going under your kindness and right. I know that all your American and American military affairs always has tolerant and rightful judgment. When I have been investigated in Manila court I have had a good treatment, kindful attitude from your good natured officers who protected me all the time. I never forget for what they have done for me even if I had died. I don't blame my executioner. I'll pray the gods bless them. Please send my thankful word to Col. Clarke and Lt. Col. Feldhaus, Lt. Col. Hendrix, Maj. Guy, Capt. Sandburg, Capt. Reel, at Manila court, and Col. Arnard. I thank you.

After the execution, his remains were buried first at the Japanese cemetery near the Los Baños Prison Camp, then were moved to Tama Cemetery in Fuchū, Tokyo.

On 23 December 1948, Lieutenant General Akira Mutō, Yamashita's chief of staff in the Philippines, was executed after being found guilty of atrocities against civilians and prisoners of war in both China and the Philippines by the International Military Tribunal for the Far East. Several of Yamashita's other subordinates in the Philippines were also prosecuted by the Philippine War Crimes Commission, including Lieutenant General Hong Sa-Ik, who was found guilty of crimes against Allied POWs and executed in 1946. He was the highest ranking ethnic Korean to be charged with war crimes relating to the conduct of the Empire of Japan.

=== Enduring legal legacy ===
The U.S. Supreme Court's 1946 Yamashita decision set a precedent, called command responsibility or the Yamashita standard, in that a commander can be held accountable before the law for the crimes committed by his troops even if he did not order them, did not stand by to allow them, or possibly even know about them or have the means to stop them. This doctrine of command accountability has been added to the Geneva Conventions and was applied to dozens of trials in the International Criminal Tribunal for the former Yugoslavia. It has been adopted by the International Criminal Court established in 2002.

=== Last will ===
Hours before his execution, in his last will, Yamashita expressed deep remorse for deaths of his soldiers. He urged the Japanese people to focus on rebuilding the nation and envision a hopeful future. Yamashita emphasized by sharing his vision for rebuilding Japan encouraging the importance of cultivating a strong sense of duty and moral judgment, promoting scientific education and highlighted the vital role of women as educators in nurturing the next generation in rebuilding Japan.

== See also ==
- Yamashita's gold
