= Mayflower Building =

Building in Manila, Philippines

Coordinates: 14°33′52″N 120°59′42″E

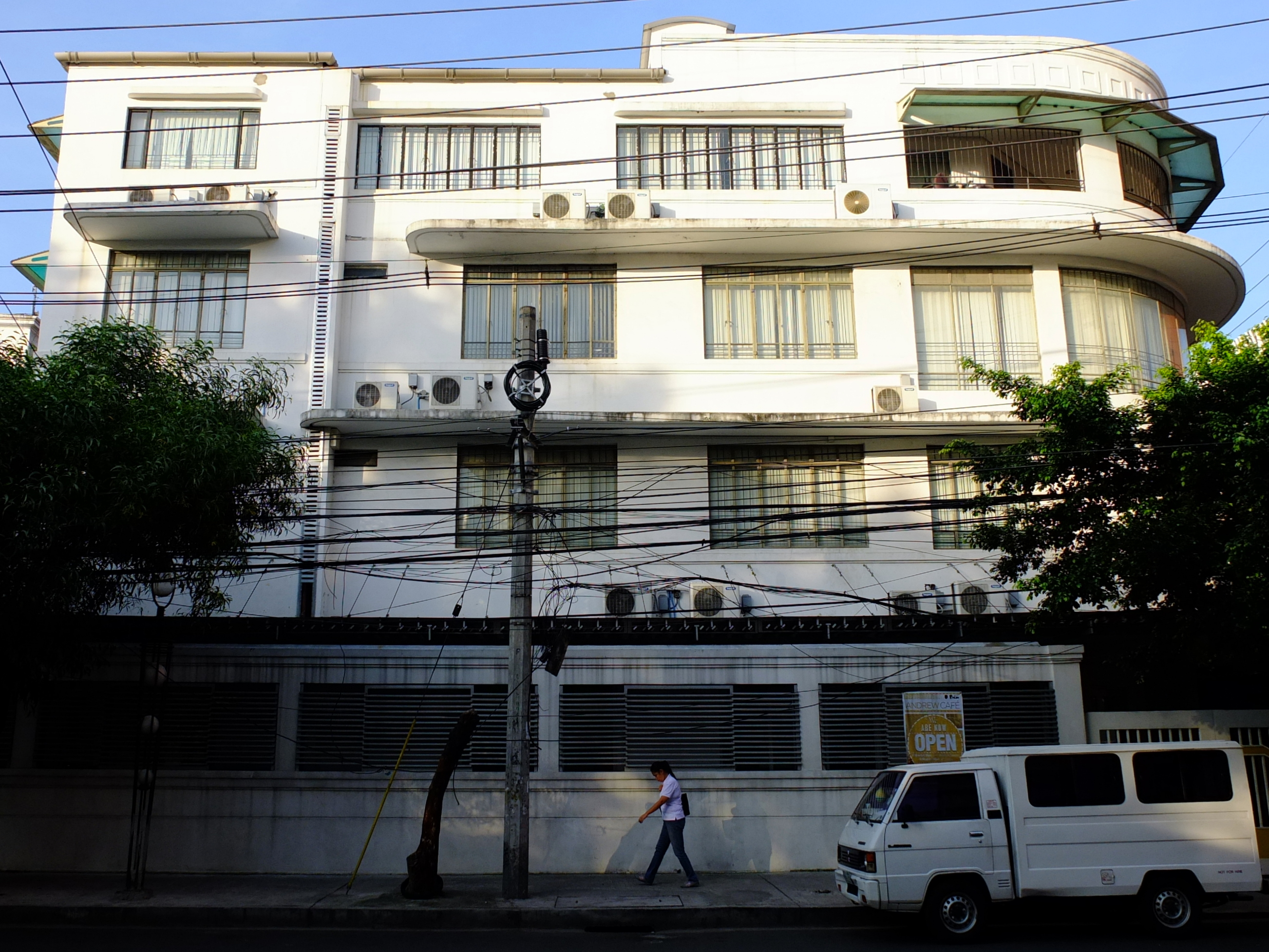
Mayflower Building along Leon Guinto St.

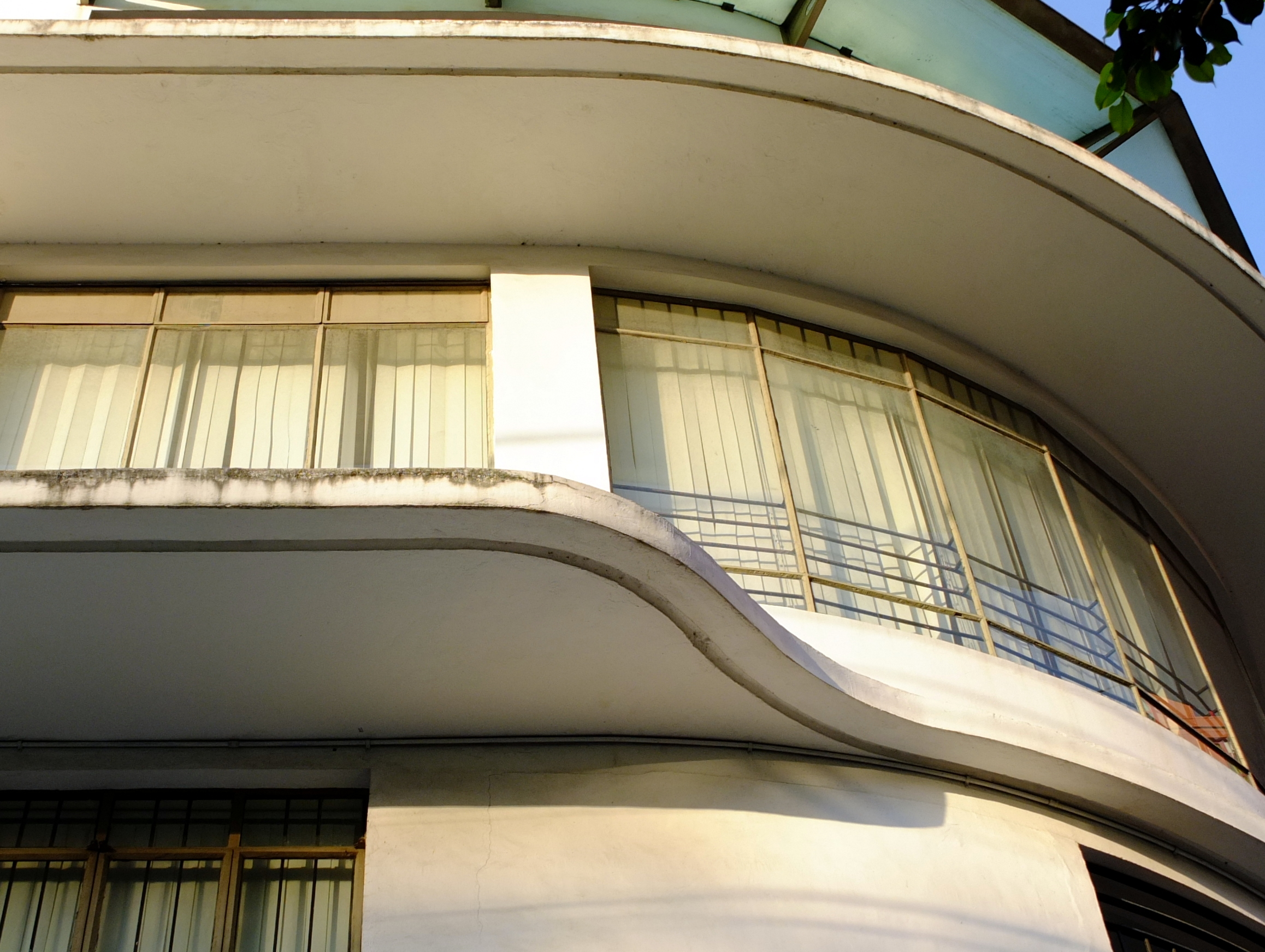
Streamlined facade detail of Mayflower Building

The Mayflower Building, built in 1938 is one of the few remaining Art Deco building in the Malate district in the city of Manila, Philippines. The Mayflower Building has a rich heritage of its own. It was placed where previous Philippine Presidents Elpidio Quirino and Ramon Magsaysay frequented. The Mayflower Building survived the ravages of World War 2 and also the fast transformation of urban landscape brought by new developments in the district. The Mayflower received much praise for its historic and architectural contributions.

Originally, the Mayflower was designed as a residential apartment and later was leased mostly to foreign dignitaries after the Liberation of Manila. The US Agency for International Development was its first non-residential occupant. After USAID vacated the building, the Mayflower has become the office of the Embassy of Indonesia and later followed by the Embassy of Spain. Afterwards, it became the headquarters of a religious organization, Opus Dei. A Spanish language school, Instituto Cervantes also occupied the building after Opus Dei vacated it.

Today, the Mayflower Building was acquired by the De La Salle – College of St. Benilde to house various offices and student facilities for the Benildean community. The building was renamed St. Miguel Febres Cordero, an Ecuadorian De La Salle Brother who is revered for his contribution to the field of teaching.
