= Forty-First Army (Japan) =

Japanese Forty-First Army
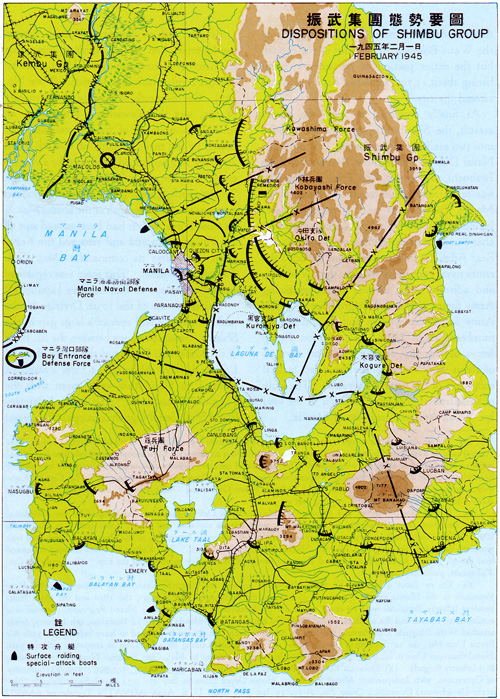
- Active: 7 April 1944 – 15 August 1945
- Country: Empire of Japan
- Branch: Imperial Japanese Army
- Type: Infantry
- Role: Corps
- Garrison/HQ: Manila, Philippines

The Japanese 41st Army (第41軍, Dai-yonjyūichi gun) was an army of the Imperial Japanese Army during the final days of World War II.

== History ==
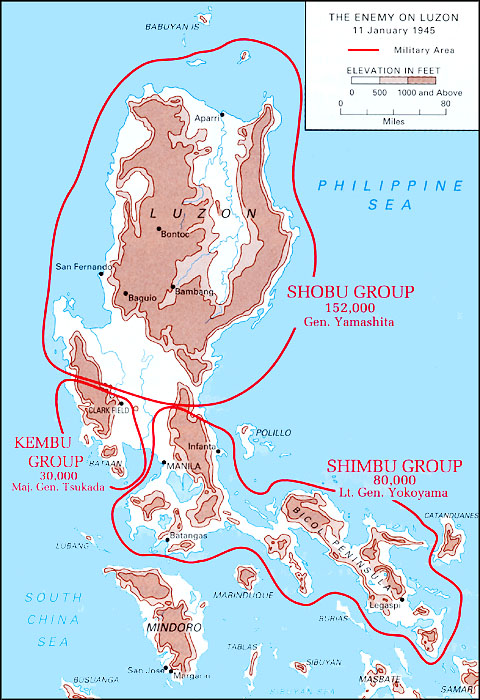
Disposition of Japanese Forces in the northern Philippines, 11 January 1945

As part of the final defenses of the Philippines against invasion and re-occupation by Allied forces in the closing stages of World War II, Imperial General Headquarters issued orders for the strategic island of Luzon to be divided into three defense sectors for defense in depth under the overall command of the Japanese Fourteenth Area Army.

From 17 December 1944, Lieutenant General Shizuo Yokoyama and his "Shimbu Group", an independent detachment, were made wholly responsible for the defense of southern Luzon, from Manila southwards. The Shimbu Group was officially re-designated the Japanese 41st Army on 6 March 1945. Yokoyama commanded Japanese forces defending Manila against the U.S. Sixth and Eighth Armies. Following the Battle of Manila, the Shimbu Group faced the 6th Army in the Battle of Wawa Dam and Battle of Ipo Dam, and lost decisively. Yokohama withdrew his surviving forces into the mountains of southern Luzon for a protracted guerrilla campaign, continuing to harass Allied forces until the surrender of Japan. By the time Yokoyama signed the instrument of surrender in Montalban, Luzon on September 8, 1945, his army had been reduced to just 6500 men.

== List of Commanders ==
	Name	From	To
Commanding Officer	Lieutenant General Shizuo Yokoyama	19 March 1945	September 1945
Chief of Staff	Major General Kenishi Sumi	31 March 1945	September 1945

== Sources ==
- Frank, Richard B (1999). Downfall: The End of the Imperial Japanese Empire. New York: Random House. ISBN 0-679-41424-X.
- Jowett, Bernard (1999). The Japanese Army 1931–45 (Volume 2, 1942–45). Osprey Publishing. ISBN 1-84176-354-3.
- Madej, Victor (1981). Japanese Armed Forces Order of Battle, 1937–1945. Game Publishing Company. ASIN: B000L4CYWW.
- Marston, Daniel (2005). The Pacific War Companion: From Pearl Harbor to Hiroshima. Osprey Publishing. ISBN 1-84176-882-0.
