= Battle of Luzon =

1945 World War II battle

- Part of the Philippines campaign (1944–1945) of World War II
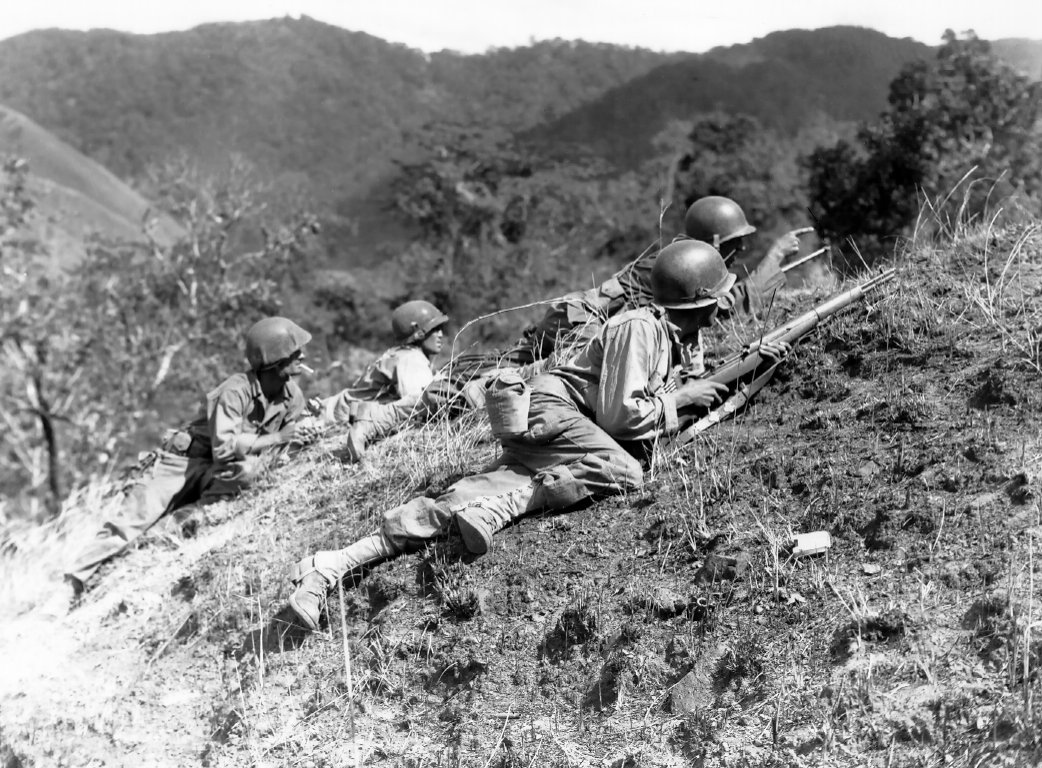
- A squad leader points out a suspected Japanese position at the edge of Balete Pass, near Baguio, where troops of the 25th Infantry Division are in fierce combat with Japanese forces. 23 March 1945.
Date	January 9 – August 15, 1945 (7 months and 6 days)
Location	Luzon, Philippines 16°N 121°E
Result	Allied victory
Territorial changes	Allies liberate the Luzon island group

Belligerents
United States: Commonwealth of the Philippines; Australia Mexico	Japan: Second Philippine Republic

Commanders and leaders
(United States) Douglas MacArthur; (United States) Walter Krueger; (United States) Robert L. Eichelberger; (Philippines) Basilio J. Valdes; (Mexico) Antonio Rodriguez	(Empire of Japan) Tomoyuki Yamashita; (Empire of Japan) Akira Mutō; (Empire of Japan) Shizuo Yokoyama

Strength
(United States) United States; Sixth Army (9 January-30 June 1945): 146,119 authorized, 143,993 assigned (17 Jan); 247,085 authorized, 232,925 assigned (12 Feb); 187,022 authorized, 179,746 assigned (30 Jun); Total replacements 9 Jan-30 Jun: 51,940; Eighth Army (1 July-15 August 1945): 76,989 authorized, 72,922 actual (1 Jul); 83,210 authorized, 80,305 actual (15 Aug); Total replacements 1 Jul-15 Aug: 11,375; Fifth Air Force (During Sixth Army period): 550 fighters (Note: 225 P-51, 225 P-28, 100 P-47); 192 light bombers (Note: all A-20s); 128 medium bombers (Note: all B-25s); 192 heavy bombers (Note: all B-24s); 66 reconnaissance; 166 Marine SBDs; 1,294 total (2/3 operable); Philippines (under USAFFE) (Note: Includes only those guerrillas who were 'actively supporting the efforts of the US Army.'): 59,723 (Sixth Army phase); 43,000 (Eighth Army phase); Mexico (Escuadrón 201, attached to Fifth Air Force): 300 personnel (ground and air crew)	(Empire of Japan) Japan (Including Naval personnel); US Post-battle Estimate: 126,760 Mobile Combat; 35,580 Base Defense; 95,550 Service Troops; 257,890 Total (excludes ~13,000 laborers); Per US Army Official History: 275,685 (includes 23,500 civilians)

Casualties and losses
United States Army Battle Casualties: Total (Note: Sixth Army's After Action Report gives 8,297 killed and missing and 29,557 wounded from 9 January to 30 June 1945. Eighth Army's After Action Report gives 643 battle casualties from 1 July to 15 August (147 killed, 21 died of wounds, 1 missing, and 474 wounded.). The Operational Monograph of the Luzon mop-up gives 655 casualties until 20 August (149 killed, 505 wounded, 1 missing. Casualties to Army Air Force, Navy, and RAAF units other than those directly attached are omitted, even if they occurred in the area of operations.); 8,436 killed and missing; 32,129 wounded; Army Nonbattle Casualties: Sixth Army: 86,954 sick; 5 missing; 254 deaths; 6,209 injured; Eighth Army: 6,443 total; Navy, Merchant, Shipboard (Note: Includes approximately 150 US Army soldiers killed and 200 wounded. It's uncertain whether these losses are included in the overall total listed above.): 13 Dec. 1944-13 Jan. 1945; Includes Royal Australian Navy; 1,655 killed; 2,100 wounded; 24 ships sunk; 67 ships damaged; Philippines: USAFIP (NL): 1,441 killed; 84 missing; 3,475 wounded; Other guerrilla losses unknown; Mexico; 10 dead (5 in the aviation school)	(Empire of Japan) Japan Battle/Nonbattle Casualties: Total (US estimate) (Note: According to Japanese estimates, up to 80% of their deaths in the Philippines were from non-combat causes Comparing figures published in the Sixth Army's after action report and JM-7, the American figure for counted dead after 27 days (17,724 and 179 prisoners) exceeds the Fourteenth Area Army's self reported total of 6,500 killed and wounded one month after S-Day by 2.75 times. JM-7 reports that by the beginning of April 1945 shortages of foodstuffs had "greatly weakened" the Fourteenth Area Army's fighting power around Baguio.); 192,561 dead (Note: Sixth Army reported 173,563 counted dead from 9 January to 30 June 1945. Eighth Army reported 20,301-20,311 from 1 July to 20 August, a total of 193,864 or 193,874.); 9,656 captured (Note: Sixth Army reported taking 4,072 prisoners from 9 January to 30 June 1945. Eighth Army reported 2,396-2,397 from 1 July to 20 August, a total of 6,468 or 6,469.); Equipment: US estimate to 30 June 1945; 308 tanks; 51 armored vehicles; 2,022 motor vehicles; 955 artillery pieces; 686 AA guns and cannon; 1,196 mortars (837 50 mm and "knee mortars"); 600 aircraft (13 Dec. to 13 Jan. 1945); Interned after 20 August 1945: 63,500+ survivors

The Battle of Luzon (Tagalog: Labanan sa Luzon; Japanese: ルソン島の戦い; Spanish: Batalla de Luzón) was a land battle of the Pacific Theater of Operations of World War II by the Allied forces of the U.S., the Philippines, Mexico, and other allies against forces of the Empire of Japan. The battle resulted in a U.S., Filipino and Mexican victory. The Allies had taken control of all strategically and economically important locations of Luzon by March 1945, although pockets of Japanese resistance held out in the mountains until the unconditional surrender of Japan. While not the highest in U.S. casualties, it is the highest net casualty battle U.S. forces fought in World War II, with 192,000 to 217,000 Japanese combatants dead (mostly from starvation and disease), 8,000 American combatants killed, and over 150,000 Filipinos, overwhelmingly civilians who were murdered by Japanese forces, mainly during the Manila massacre of February 1945.

== Background ==
The Philippines was considered to be of great strategic importance because its capture by Japan would pose a significant threat to the U.S. As a result, 135,000 troops and 227 aircraft were stationed in the Philippines by October 1941. However, Luzon—the largest island in the Philippines—was captured by Imperial Japanese forces in 1942. General Douglas MacArthur—who was in charge of the defense of the Philippines at the time—was ordered to Australia, and the remaining U.S. forces retreated to the Bataan Peninsula.

A few months after this, MacArthur expressed his belief that an attempt to recapture the Philippines was necessary. The U.S. Pacific Commander Admiral Chester Nimitz and Chief of Naval Operations Admiral Ernest King both opposed this idea, arguing that it must wait until victory was certain. MacArthur had to wait two years for his wish; it was 1944 before a campaign to recapture the Philippines was launched. The island of Leyte was the first objective of the campaign, which was captured by the end of December 1944. This was followed by the attack on Mindoro, and later, Luzon.

== Prelude ==
Before U.S. forces could launch the attack on Luzon, a base of operation needed to be established close to the island. Airbases in particular had to be established in order to provide the advancing troops with air support. Troops under Brigadier General William C. Dunckel captured the island of Mindoro, with the assistance of the 7th Fleet. By 28 December, two airbases were controlled by the U.S. and were ready to assist in the attack on Luzon, which was scheduled to be launched on 9 January 1945. With the capture of Mindoro, U.S. forces were positioned south of Luzon. However, MacArthur intended to land his forces at Lingayen, further north. This would place his troops close to several roads and railways on Luzon, which led to Manila—the main objective—through the plains in the center of the island.

=== Deception operations ===
U.S. aircraft constantly made reconnaissance and bombing flights over southern Luzon, intending to deceive the Japanese forces into believing that the attack on Luzon would come from the south. In addition, transport aircraft were used to make parachute drops with dummies. Minesweepers were used to clear the bays of Balayan, Batangas, and Tayabas, located to the south of Luzon, and Filipino resistance fighters conducted sabotage operations in southern Luzon. These deception operations failed to convince General Tomoyuki Yamashita, the leader of the Imperial Japanese Army in the Philippines, and he built significant defensive positions in the hills and mountains surrounding Lingayen Gulf in Northern Luzon.

== Opposing forces ==
=== Allied ===
Theatre and ground force commanders for the liberation of the Philippines

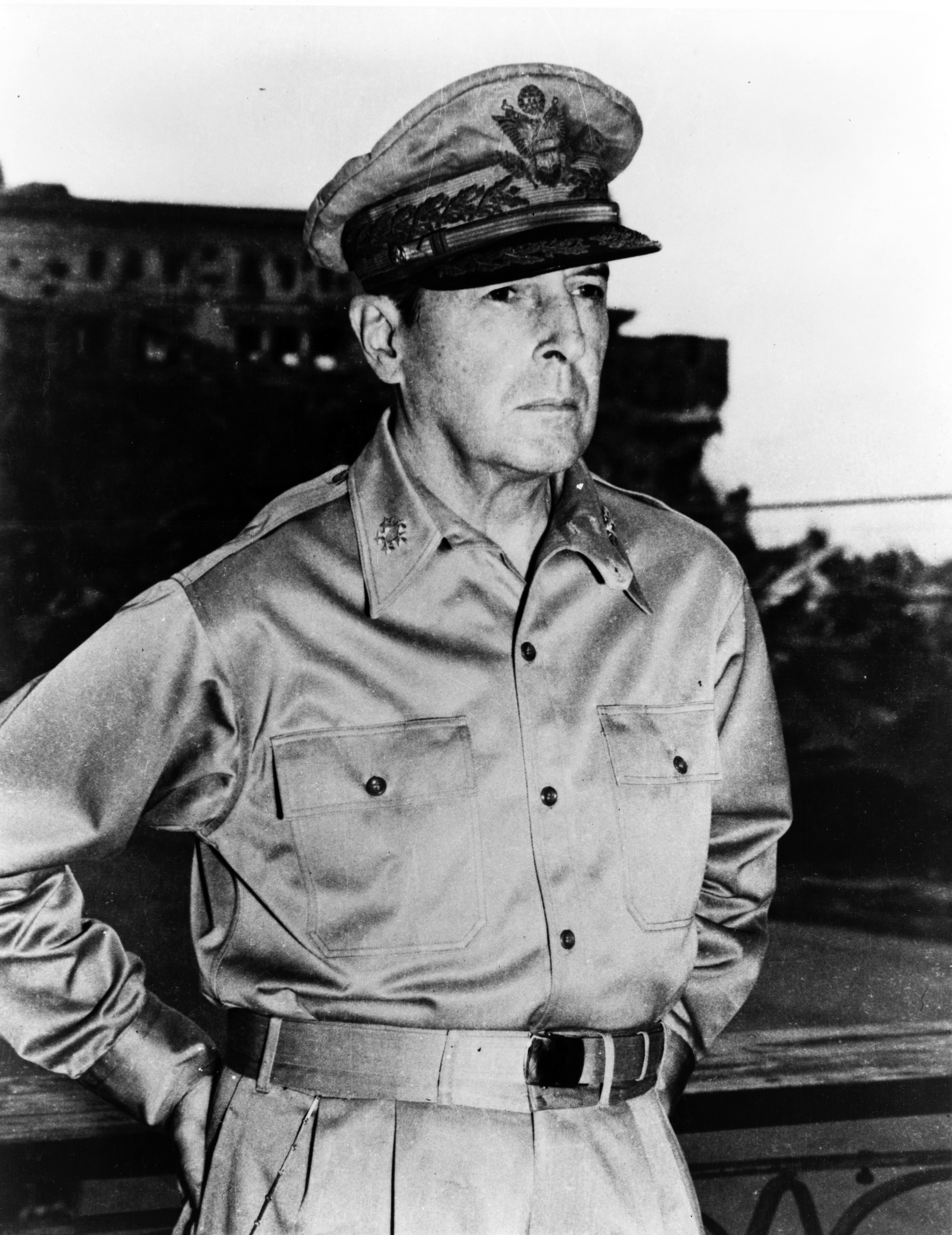
Gen. Douglas MacArthur

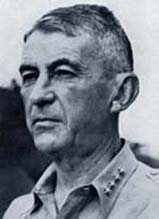
Walter Krueger as a full general

Naval and ground commanders for
Lingayen area

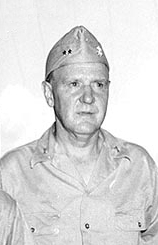
Vice Adm. Theodore S. Wilkinson

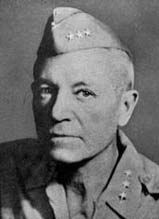
Oscar W. Griswold as a lieut. general

Naval and ground commanders for
San Fabian area

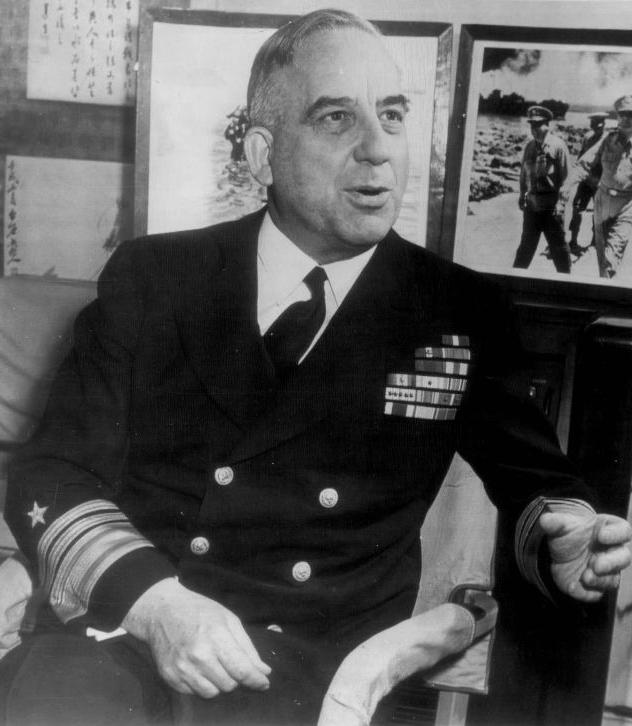
Vice Adm. Daniel E. Barbey

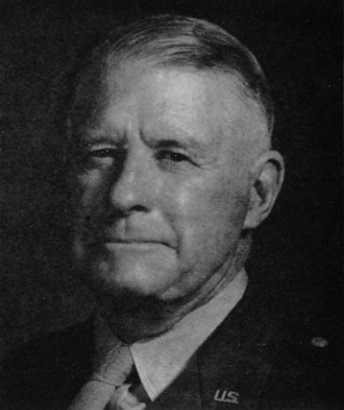
Major Gen. Innis P. Swift

US Army artillery preserved

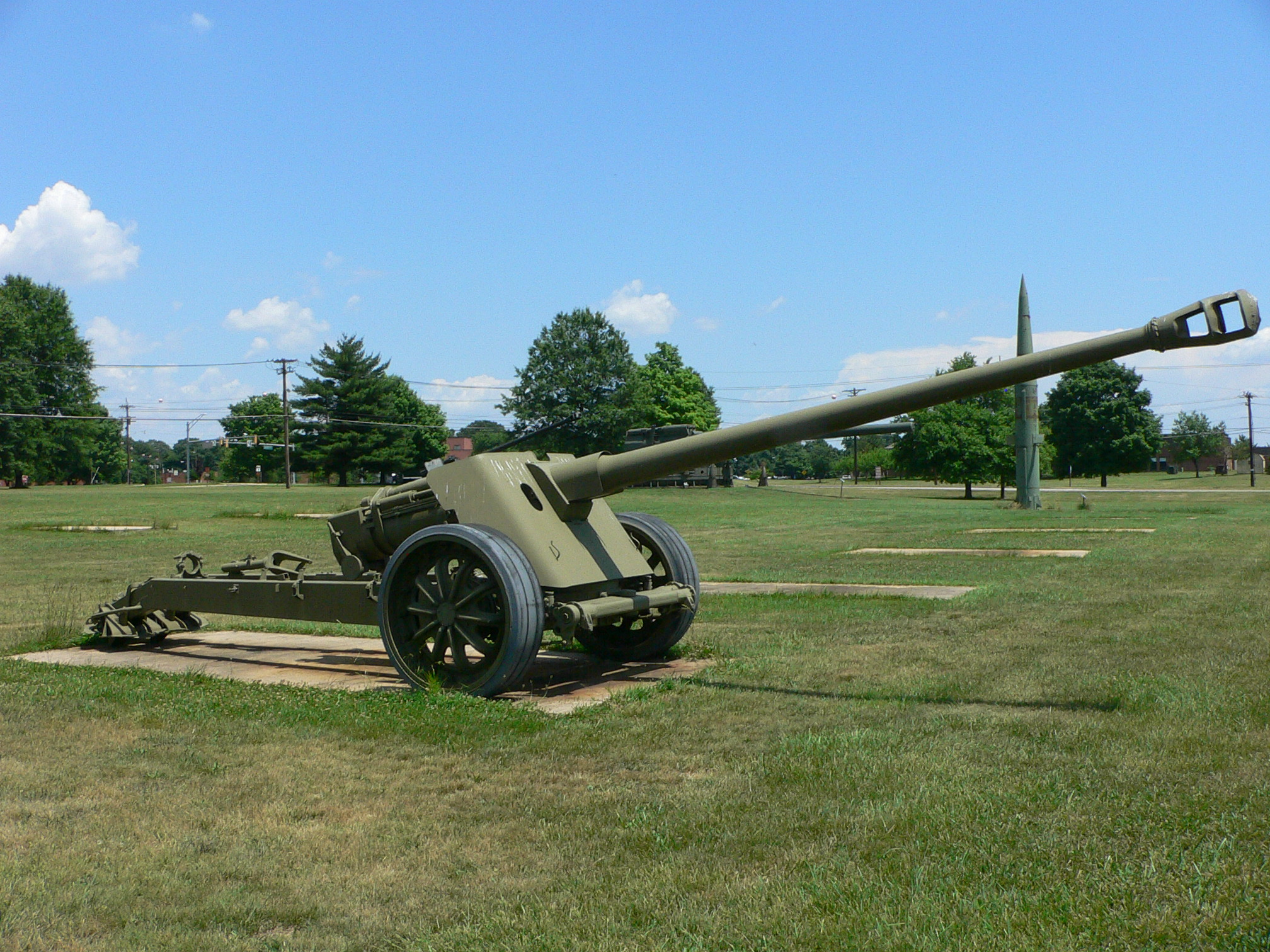
105mm gun

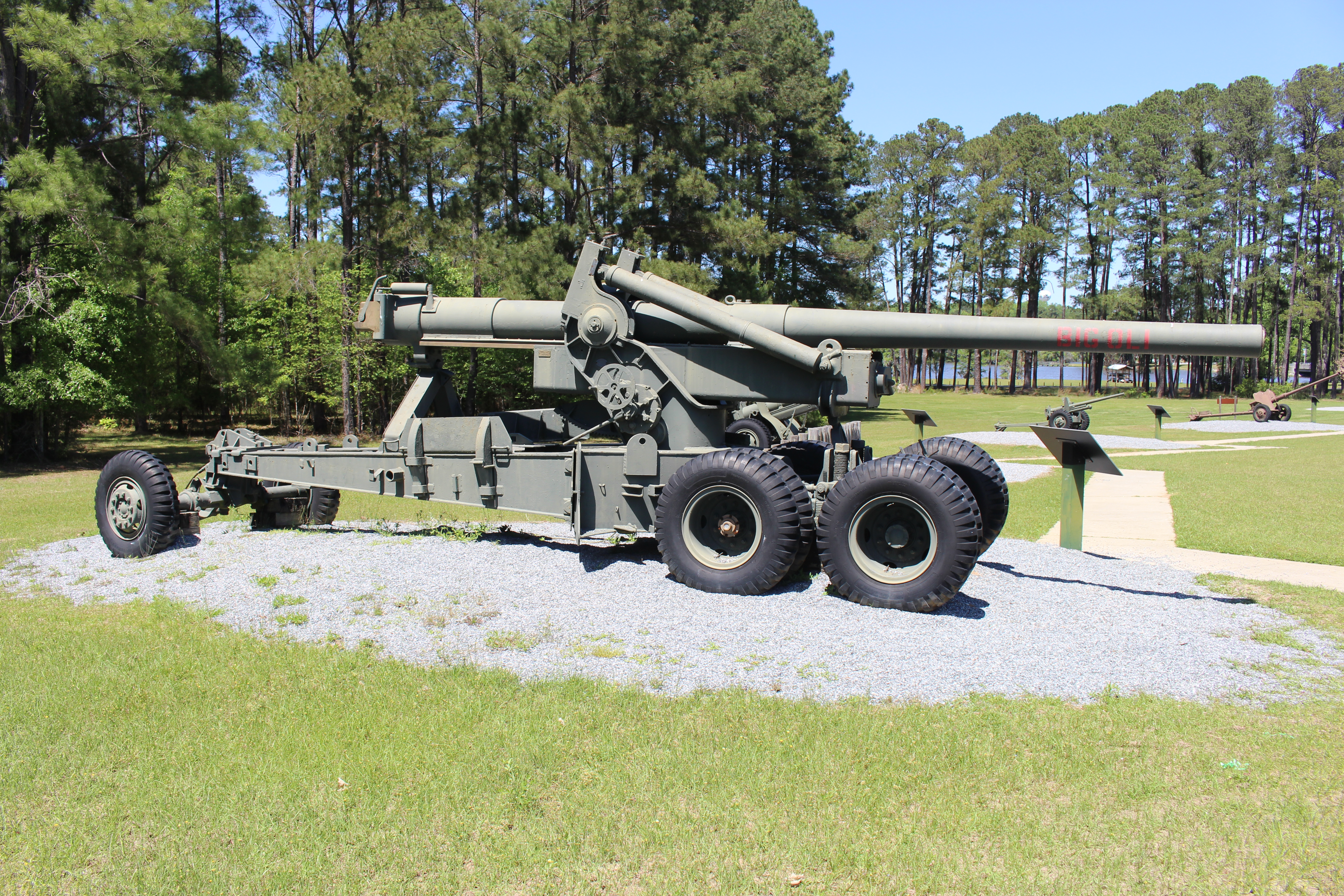
155mm gun

Allied Forces, Southwest Pacific Area
General Douglas MacArthur

US Sixth Army (193,901 officers and enlisted)
Lieutenant General Walter Krueger

Western Landing Area (Lingayen)

XIV Army Corps
Major General Oscar W. Griswold
Embarked in Task Force 79 (Vice Adm. Theodore S. Wilkinson)

Left (Crimson and Yellow) beaches

37th Infantry ("Buckeye") Division
Major General Robert S. Beightler

129th Infantry Regiment
145th Infantry Regiment
148th Infantry Regiment
6th, 135th, 140th Field Artillery Bttns. (105mm)
136th Field Artillery Bttn. (155mm)

Right (Orange and Green) beaches

40th Infantry ("Sunshine") Division
Major General I. Rapp Brush

108th Infantry Regiment
160th Infantry Regiment
185th Infantry Regiment
143rd, 164th, 213th Field Artillery Bttns. (105mm)
222nd Field Artillery Bttn. (155mm)

Eastern Landing Area (San Fabian)

I Army Corps
Major General Innis P. Swift
Embarked in Task Force 78 (Vice Adm. Daniel E. Barbey)

Left (White) beaches

43rd Infantry ("Winged Victory") Division
Major General Leonard F. Wing

103rd Infantry Regiment
169th Infantry Regiment
172nd Infantry Regiment
103rd, 152nd, 169th Field Artillery Bttns. (105mm)
192nd Field Artillery Bttn. (155mm)

Right (Blue) beaches

6th Infantry ("Red Star") Division
Major General Edwin D. Patrick † (Note: Killed in action east of Manila. Patrick was mortally wounded by Japanese machine gun fire and died the following day.)

1st Infantry Regiment
20th Infantry Regiment
63rd Infantry Regiment
1st, 51st, 53rd Field Artillery Bttns. (105mm)
80th Field Artillery Bttn. (155mm)

=== Japanese ===
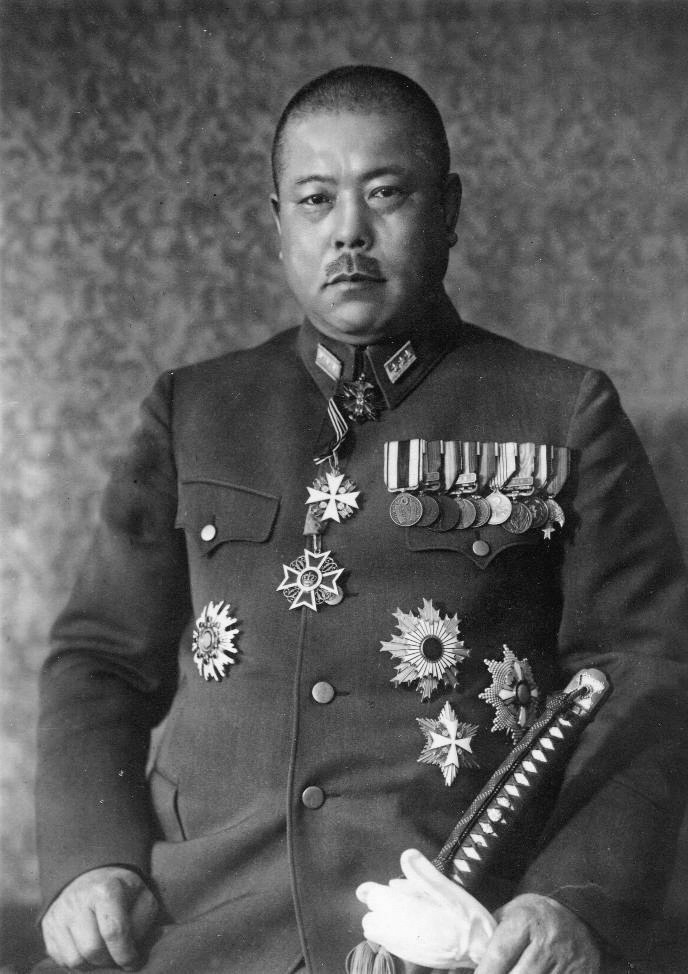
Lt. Gen. Tomoyuki Yamashita

Fourteenth Area Army (Note: A Japanese area army was equivalent to a Euro-American army. (A Japanese army was equivalent to a Euro-American corps.))
General Tomoyuki Yamashita (Note: Hanged after the war for atrocities committed by troops under his command.)

Northern Luzon

Shobu Group (Gen. Yamashita)
approx. 152,000 officers and enlisted

Central Luzon

Kembu Group (Lieut. Gen. Rikichi Tsukada)
approx. 30,000 officers and enlisted

Southern Luzon

Shimbu Group (Lieut. Gen. Shizuo Yokoyama)
approx. 80,000 officers and enlisted

== Battle ==
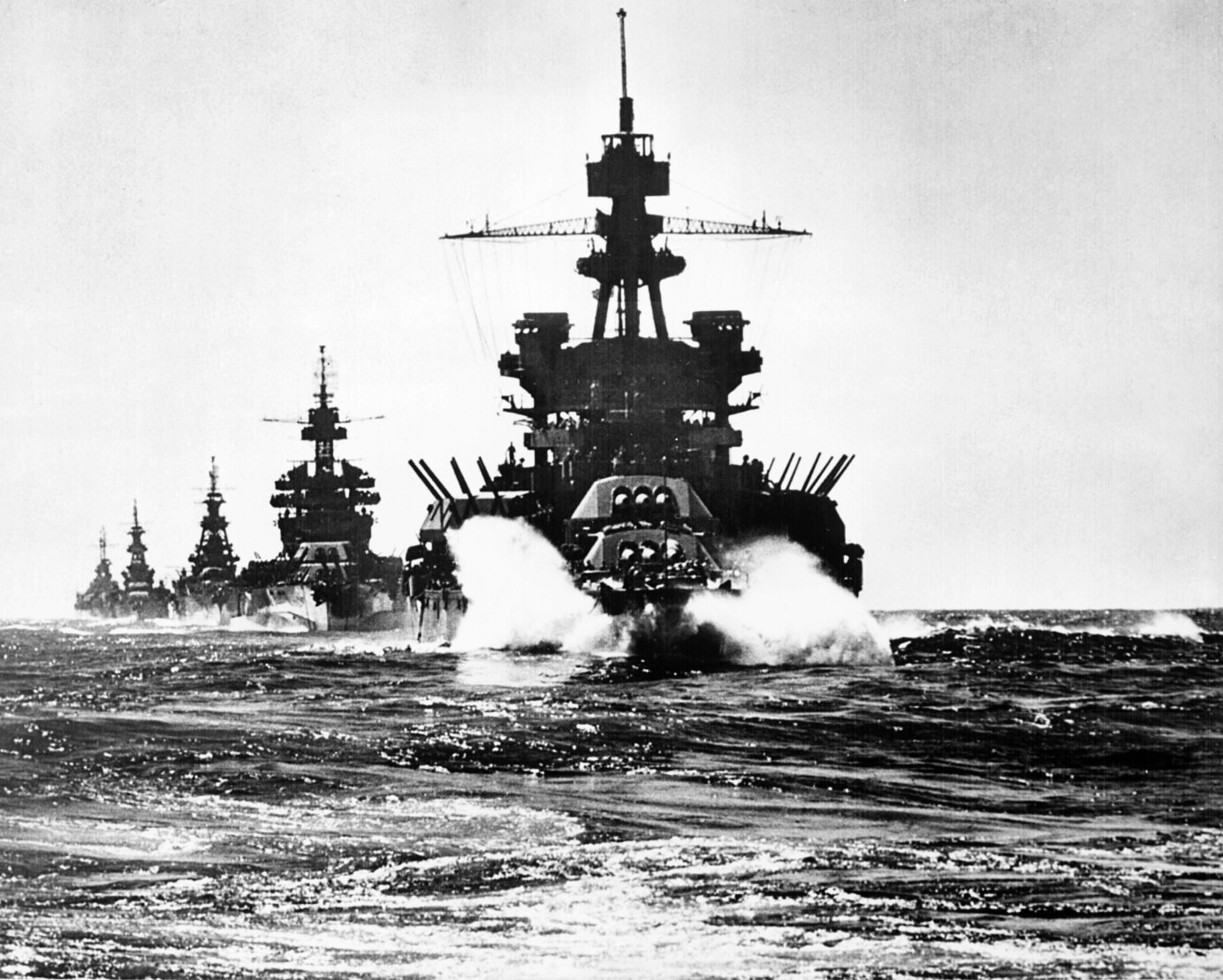
The battleships Pennsylvania and Colorado lead three cruisers into Lingayen Gulf for the pre-assault bombardment of Japanese shore positions

The assault on Luzon was launched, as planned, on 9 January 1945, codenamed S-day. The Japanese forces reported more than 70 Allied warships entering Lingayen Gulf, though the total Allied invasion force involved that month would equal close to 800 ships. Pre-assault bombardment of Japanese shore positions from roughly 70 battleships and cruisers began at 7:00. The landings were commenced an hour later. The landing forces faced strong opposition from Japanese kamikaze aircraft. The escort carrier Ommaney Bay was destroyed by a kamikaze attack, with a total of around 47 ships damaged, and four sunk, on January 3–13, primarily by kamikazes. Aircraft from the 3rd Fleet, including Mexico's 201st squadron, assisted the landings with close air support, strafing and bombing Japanese gun positions.

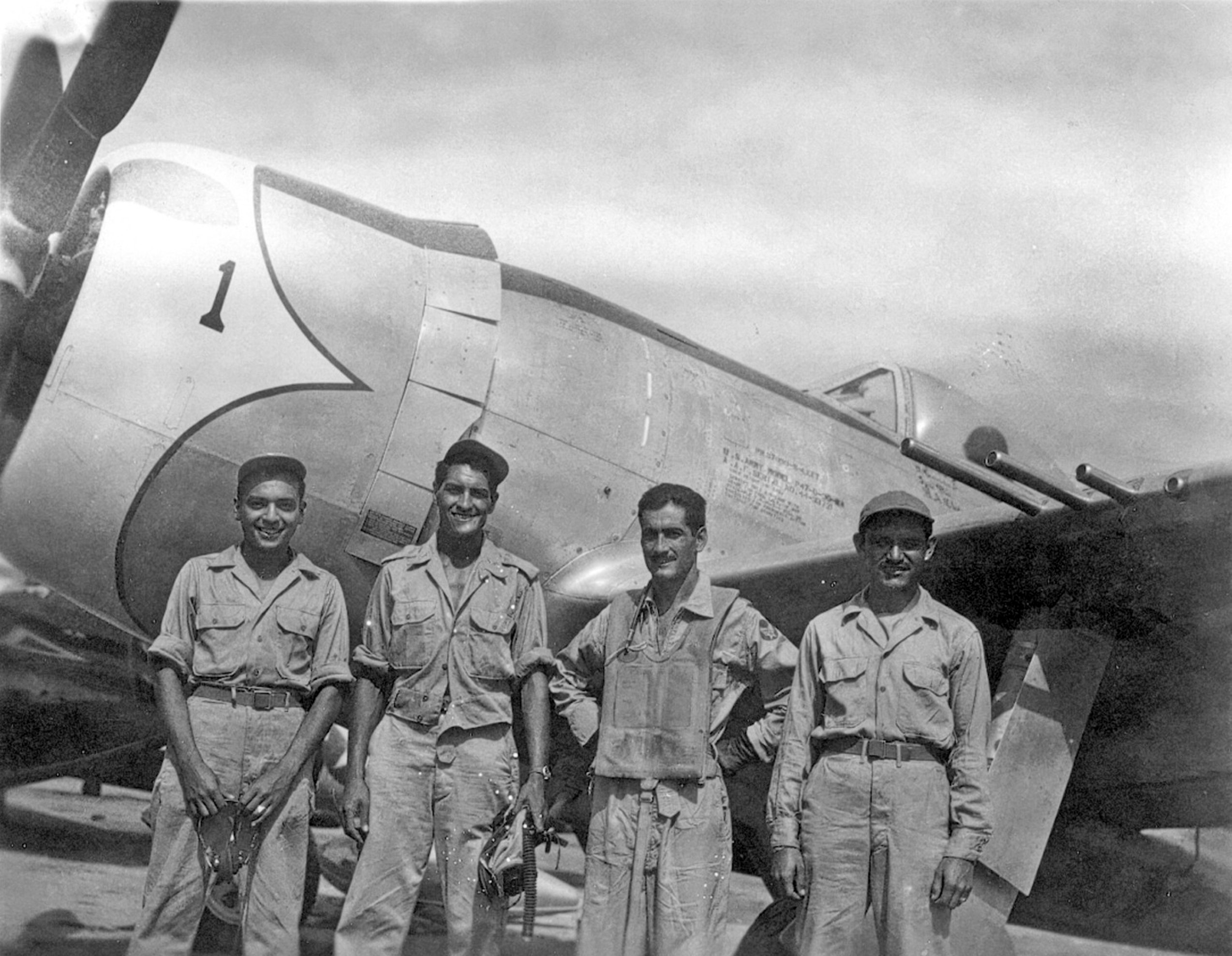
Captain Radamés Gaxiola of Escuadrón 201 stands in front of his P-47D with his maintenance team after returning from a combat mission over Luzon.

The landings at Lingayen Gulf on 9 January were carried out by the 6th Army under the command of General Walter Krueger. Approximately 175,000 troops from the 6th Army landed along the 20-mile (32 km) beachhead within a few days, while the I Corps protected their flanks. XIV Corps under General Oscar Griswold then advanced south toward Manila, despite Krueger's concerns that his eastern flank was unprotected and vulnerable if the Japanese forces attacked. However, no such attack occurred, and the U.S. forces did not meet much resistance until they reached the Clark Air Base on 23 January. The battle there lasted until the end of January, and after capturing the base, XIV Corps advanced toward Manila.

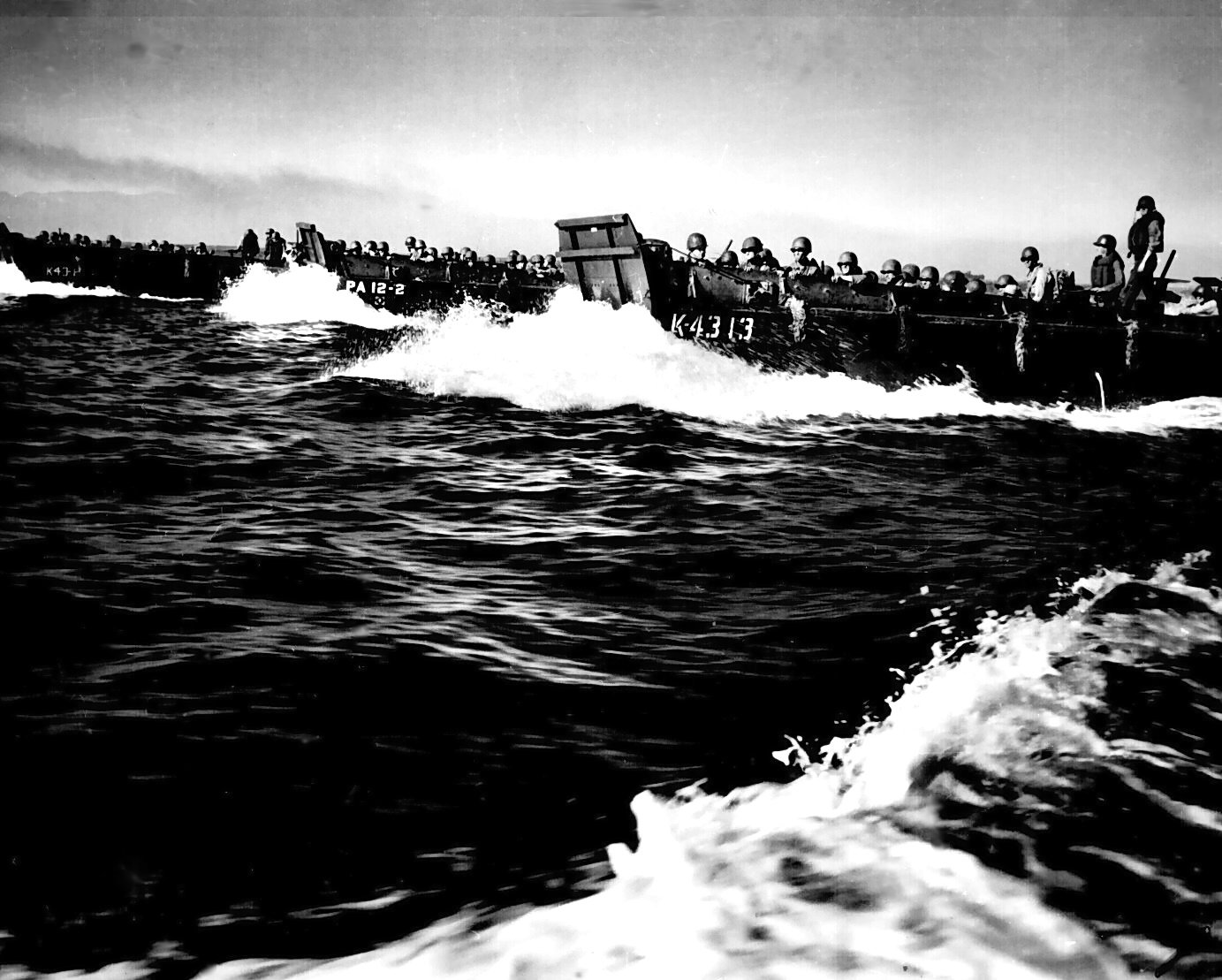
The first wave of troops approaching the beaches of Luzon.

From the middle of January to early February the largest ever tank battle between American and Japanese forces took place. The Japanese 2nd Tank Division's 220 tanks (175 Type 97 ShinHōtō Chi-Ha medium tanks, 25 Type 97 Chi-Ha medium tanks, and 20 Type 95 Ha-Go light tanks) faced off against only 76 American tanks (59 M4 Sherman medium tanks and 17 M5A1 Stuart light tanks) supported by infantry armed with bazookas and dozens of 105mm M7 Priest self-propelled howitzers. Krueger had more tanks held in reserve to the north because of the threat of an unknown number of Japanese tanks being withheld from combat until ambushing them en masse in the exposed open flat plains of Central Luzon so the 76 Shermans and Stuarts and accompanying M7 Priests were tasked with finding and destroying them with their superior guns and armor. The Japanese made this tank battle last for over three weeks instead of a single one-day battle by hiding their tanks behind and under camouflaged and protected fortifications, either digging the tanks into the ground or creating a series of semi-enclosed fortifications for them to move around and reposition during the battles. Some of these tanks were used to patrol and engage the enemy especially at night. From San Manuel to Muñoz the tanks dueled with each other leading to the deaths of hundreds of American soldiers and thousands of Japanese soldiers as well as the loss of dozens of American tanks and around 200 Japanese tanks.

A second amphibious landing took place on 15 January, 45 mi (72 km) southwest of Manila. On 31 January, two regiments of the 11th Airborne Division made an airborne assault, capturing a bridge, and later advanced toward Manila. On 3 February, the 1st Cavalry Division captured the bridge across Tullahan River leading to the city. They advanced into the city that evening, beginning the battle for the capture of Manila. On 4 February, the paratroopers of the 11th Airborne—approaching the city from the south—came to the main Japanese defenses south of the city of Manila where their advance was halted by heavy resistance. General Yamashita had ordered his troops to destroy all bridges and other vital installations as soon as the U.S. forces entered the city, and Japanese forces entrenched throughout the city continued to resist U.S. forces. General MacArthur announced the imminent recapture of Manila on the same day. On 11 February, the 11th Airborne Division captured the last Japanese outer defenses, thus encircling the whole city. U.S. and Filipino forces carried out clearing operations in the city in the following weeks. Military casualties totaled 1,010 Americans, 3,079 Filipinos, and 16,000 Japanese.

In the campaign to recapture the island of Luzon in the Philippines, American planes dropped more than one million gallons of napalm in support of ground forces. The weapon attracted little attention during World War II in part because the name “napalm” was classified.

== Aftermath ==
Battles continued throughout the island of Luzon in the following weeks, with more U.S. troops having landed on the island. Filipino and American resistance fighters also attacked Japanese positions and secured several locations. The Allies had taken control of all strategically and economically important locations of Luzon by early March. Small groups of the remaining Japanese forces retreated to the mountainous areas in the north and southeast of the island, where they were besieged for months. Pockets of Japanese soldiers held out in the mountains—most ceasing resistance with the unconditional surrender of Japan, but a scattered few holding out for many years afterwards. Total Japanese losses were 217,000 dead and 9,050 taken prisoner. U.S. losses were 8,310 killed and 29,560 wounded. Civilian casualties are estimated at 120,000 to 140,000 dead. Only 2,000 Japanese troops out of the 30,000 in the Kembu group and 8,300 troops out of the 80,000 in the Shimbu group survived the war. After the Japanese surrender it was revealed that Yamashita's Shobu group in northern Luzon had enough food to sustain themselves for only one more month. Yamashita had planned on committing suicide if the war had continued and almost all of his remaining men died of starvation and were no longer able to fight.

== Appendix ==
Weapons on hand and ammunition expended by Sixth Army units, 9 January 1945 to 30 June 1945, exclusive of Eighth Army phase (173 days):

Item/Ammunition Type	Ammunition Expended	Average per Day	Maximum number of weapons
Carbine	12,992,493	75,101	77,773
Automatic Rifle	11,467,625	66,267	3,145 BAR, 3,212 '03 Rifle
M1 Rifle	22,388,947	129,416	58,380
.30 cal. MG	25,257,659	145,998	5,369
.45 cal. pistol	7,102,776	41,057	9,664 pistol, 13,533 SMG
.50 cal. MG	4,318,847	24,964	3,756 ground, 1,829 AA
40 mm AA gun	33,053	191	280
90 mm AA gun	44,570	258	102
37 mm Tank & AT gun	64,524	373	116 Tank, 355 AT
37 mm T-32	10,818	63	33
57 mm AT gun	25,244	146	235
60 mm mortar	691,969	4,000	892
81 mm mortar	1,061,620	6,136	559
75 mm Tank gun	81,524	471	229
76 mm AT gun	15,398	89	36
3 inch (76.2 mm) AT gun	10,948	63	72
75 mm howitzer	144,959	898	52 Field Artillery, 21 LVT/SP
105 mm howitzer M2A1	689,010	9,763	380 Field Artillery, 135 SP-Tank, 10 Tank
105 mm howitzer M3	17,296	141	12
155 mm howitzer M1	384,288	2,220	180
Launcher, rocket, 2.36 inch	83,494	483	5,892
Rifle & Carbine grenades	117,322	678	18,250 launchers
Hand grenades	841,413	4,864	--
155 mm gun	56,424	326	36
8 inch (203 mm) howitzer	14,026	92	12
240 mm howitzer	5,445	41	6
Land mines/Bangalore torpedoes	11,923	69	--
Artillery fuses	374,493	2,165	--
Flares, signals, projectors	36,978	214	--
Total Tonnage Expended (short tons)	111,327	644	--

== See also ==
- Invasion of Lingayen Gulf
- Battle of Bessang Pass
- Battle of Balete Pass
- Battle of Manila (1945)
- Battle of Villa Verde Trail
- Battle of Wawa Dam
- List of American guerrillas in the Philippines
- Escuadrón 201
- Japanese holdout
- Manila massacre
- William R. Shockley
