= Shizuo Yokoyama =

Japanese officer and war criminal (1890–1961)

- 横山 静雄
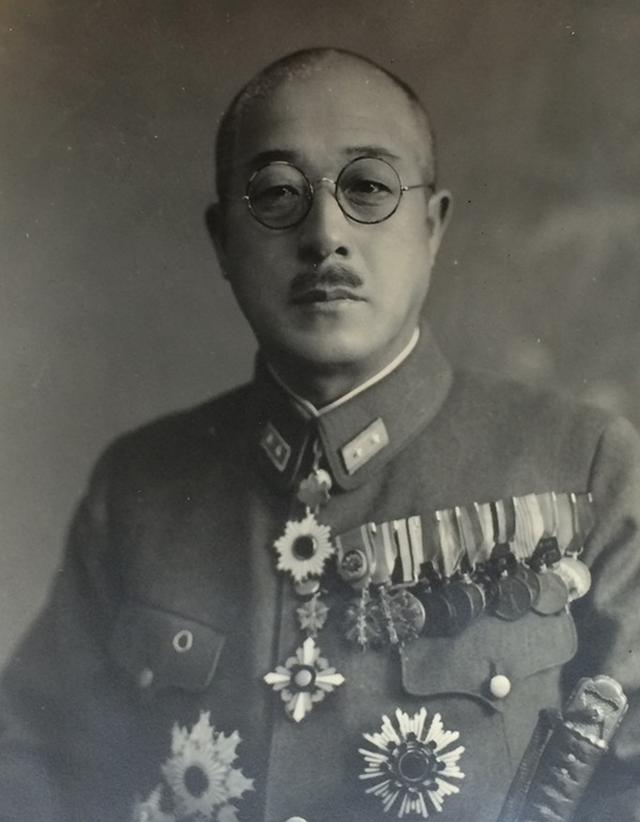
- Born: December 1, 1890; Fukuoka Prefecture, Empire of Japan
- Died: January 6, 1961 (aged 70); Japan
- Military career
- Allegiance: Empire of Japan
- Branch: Imperial Japanese Army
- Service years: 1912―1945
- Rank: Lieutenant General
- Commands: IJA 8th Division, IJA 41st Army
- Conflicts: World War II

Shizuo Yokoyama (横山 静雄, Yokoyama Shizuo; 1 December 1890 – 6 January 1961) was a lieutenant general in the Imperial Japanese Army in World War II, who is noted for his role in the Battle of Manila, the single largest urban battle ever fought by American forces, during the final days of World War II.

== Biography ==
Yokoyama was born in Fukuoka Prefecture as the eldest son of a village mayor. He graduated from the 24th class of the Imperial Japanese Army Academy in 1912 and the 37th class of the Army Staff College in 1925. His rise through the ranks was steady and rapid, serving in mostly staff and administrative posts within the Chosen Army and Imperial Japanese Army General Staff, aside from a brief combat deployment during the Japanese intervention in Siberia and an observation tour in Europe in 1934. He was as appointed commander of the Kwantung Army's Railway Zone serving in that post until 1937.

With the start of the Second Sino-Japanese War, Yokoyama was appointed commander of the IJA 2nd Infantry Regiment from March 1938 to March 1939, whereupon he was promoted to major general. He was assigned command of the 2nd Field Railway, followed by the 1st Field Railway until his promotion to lieutenant general in 1941. In June 1942, Yokoyama was assigned command of the Manchukuo-based IJA 8th Division, which was garrisoned in eastern Heilongjiang guarding the border with the Soviet Union. However, in 1944, as the situation in the Pacific War continued to deteriorate for the Japanese, portions of the IJA 8th Division were sent to Truk, where they were largely annihilated by lack of food and American air raids. The remainder of the division was transferred from Manchukuo to the Philippines under the command of General Yamashita Tomoyuki's 14th Area Army, and under the name of “Shimbu Group”, was wholly made responsible for the defense of southern Luzon. Suffering severe casualties, the remnants of the command was assigned to the IJA 41st Army in March 1945. Yokoyama was responsible for defending Manila against the U.S. Sixth and Eighth Armies. Most of the defenders in Manila were the Manila Naval Defense Force, commanded by Adm. Sanji Iwabuchi. While, Gen. Yokoyama retreated to the Sierra Madres to control the hills east of Manila and its water source, the Imperial Japanese Navy's troops held out in Manila. The Shimbu Force would continue fighting after Manila fell in the Battle of Wawa Dam. In 3 months of fighting, the Shimbu Group in the Sierra Madres that had started off with 40,000 troops was reduced to just 6,500 men.

At the end of the war, Yokoyama was arrested, taken before a military tribunal in Manila, and charged with war crimes due to the various atrocities committed by Japanese forces during the Japanese defense of Manila. He was found guilty and sentenced to death. However, Yokoyama's death sentence was never carried out. In July 1953, Yokoyama's death sentence was commuted by President Elpidio Quirino and he was allowed to return to Japan. Yokoyama served another six months at Sugamo Prison before being pardoned entirely in December 1953. In an interview done after his pardon and before his return to Japan, Yokoyama accepted responsibility for what he had allowed to happen and said, "The memory of the destruction and murder committed in the Philippines will remain with me as a nightmare that I will carry to my grave..." He died in 1961.
