= Battle of Manila (1945) =

1945 battle of the Philippines campaign

- Part of the Philippines campaign (1944–1945) of the Pacific Theater of World War II
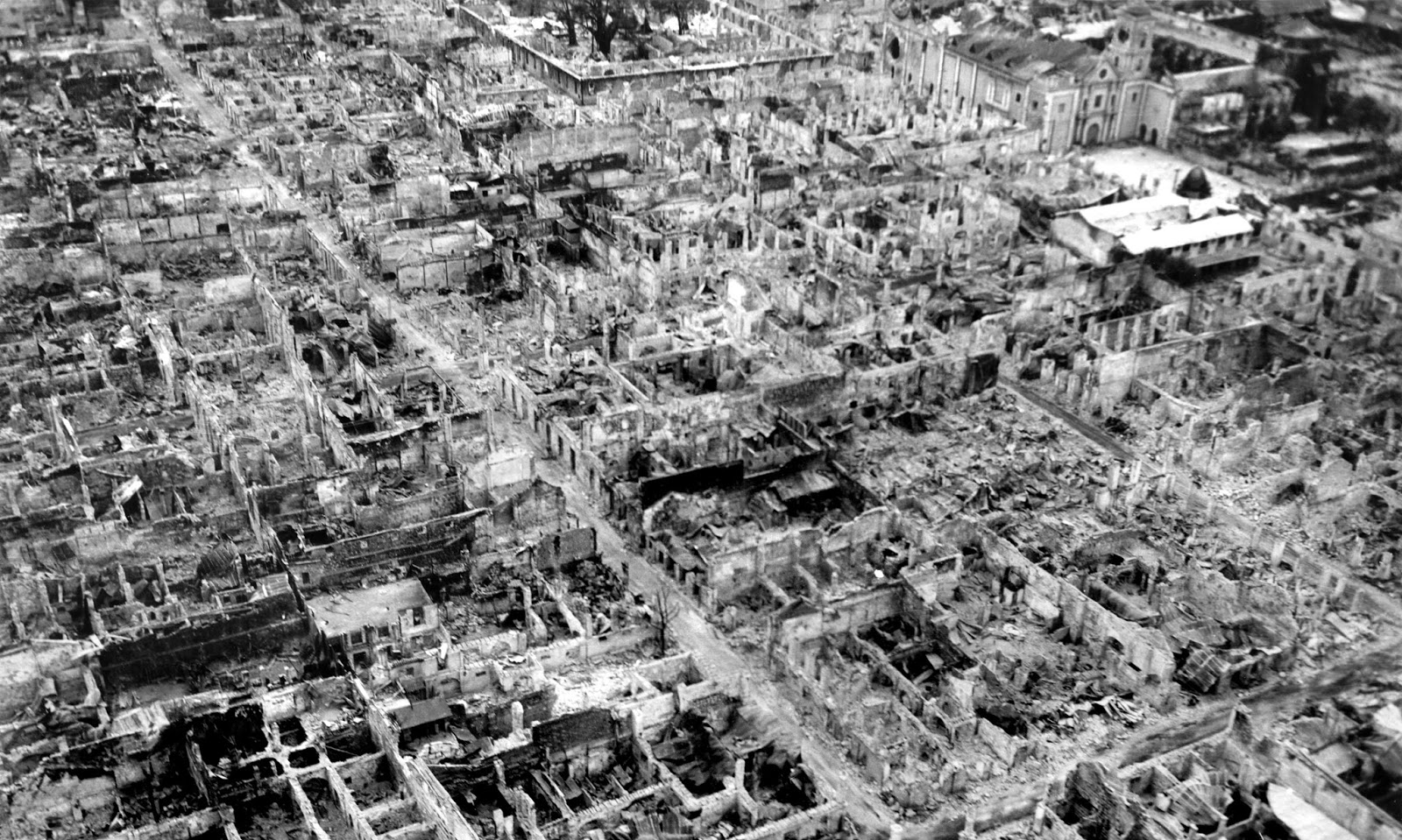
- An aerial view of the destroyed walled city of Intramuros taken in May 1945. The entire old city was razed, with only the San Agustin Church seen standing at upper right.
Date	February 3rd – March 3rd 1945 (1 month)
Location	Manila, Philippines 14°35′N 120°58′E
Result	Allied victory
Territorial changes	Allied capture of Manila

Belligerents
United States: Commonwealth of the Philippines	Japan: Republic of the Philippines (Second Republic)

Commanders and leaders
Douglas MacArthur; Oscar Griswold; Robert S. Beightler; Joseph M. Swing; Alfredo M. Santos; Marcos V. Agustin	Tomoyuki Yamashita; Akira Muto; Shizuo Yokoyama; Sanji Iwabuchi ‡‡ Emilio Aguinaldo (POW)

Units involved
XIV Corps; 37th Infantry Division; 1st Cavalry Division; 11th Airborne Division; Philippine Army; Marking Guerrillas; Hunters ROTC	14th Area Army; 8th Infantry Division; Combined Fleet; 3rd Southern Expeditionary Fleet; 31st Naval Base Force

Strength
35,000 US troops 3,000 Filipino guerrillas	12,500 sailors and marines 4,500 soldiers

Casualties and losses
1,010 killed 5,565 wounded	16,000 killed (at least 12,500 from the Manila Naval Defense Force)
- Civilians: 100,000+ killed 250,000 total casualties

The Battle of Manila (3 February – 3 March 1945) was a major battle during the Philippine campaign of 1944–45, during the Second World War. It was fought by forces from both the United States and the Philippines against Imperial Japanese troops in Manila, the capital city of the Philippines. The month-long battle, which resulted in the death of at least 100,000 civilians and the complete devastation of the city, was the scene of the worst urban fighting fought by American forces in the Pacific theater. During the battle, Japanese forces committed mass murder against Filipino civilians, while American firepower also killed many people. The fierce resistance of Japanese troops entrenched in many of the city's landmarks, along with the usage of massed artillery barrages by American forces to dislodge them, destroyed much of Manila's architectural and cultural heritage dating back to the city's founding. Often referred to as "the Stalingrad of Asia", the battle is widely considered to be one of the most destructive urban battles ever fought, as well as the single largest urban battle ever fought by American forces.

The battle caused Manila to become one of the most devastated capital cities of the Second World War, alongside Berlin and Warsaw. The Allied victory contributed greatly to ending almost three years of Japanese military occupation in the Philippines (1942–1945). Manila's capture was seen as General Douglas MacArthur's key to victory in the campaign to liberate the islands, although heavy fighting continued in Luzon (and elsewhere in the Philippines) until the end of the war in August 1945. It is, to date, the last battle fought within Manila.

== Background ==
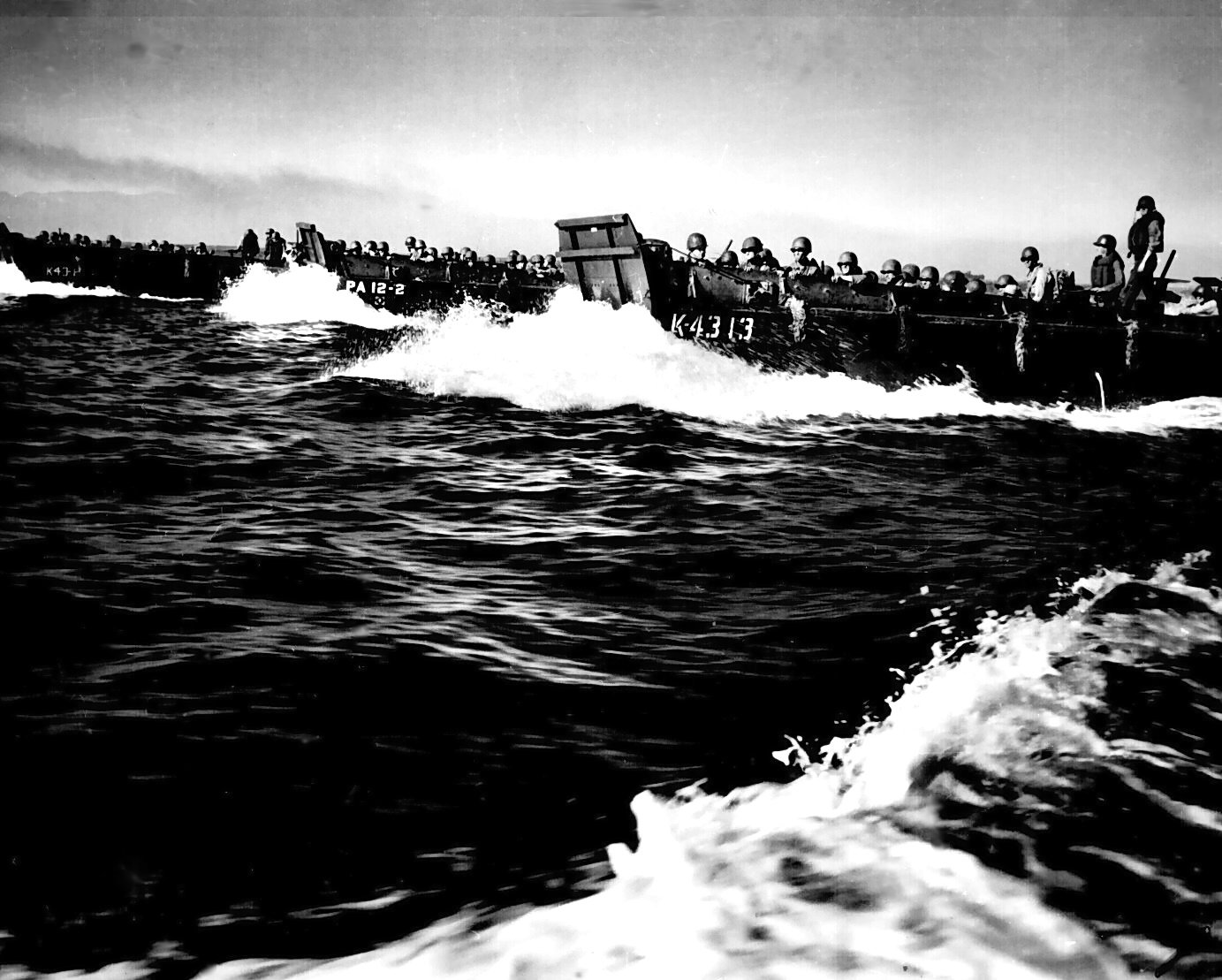
The first wave of American troops approaching the beaches of Luzon, January 9, 1945

On 9 January 1945, the Sixth U.S. Army under Lt. Gen. Walter Krueger made an amphibious landing at Lingayen Gulf and began a rapid drive south as part of the Battle of Luzon. On 12 January, MacArthur ordered Krueger to advance swiftly to Manila. The 37th Infantry Division, under the command of Major Gen. Robert S. Beightler, spearheaded the American push south.

After landing at San Fabian on 27 January, the 1st Cavalry Division, under the command of Major Gen. Verne D. Mudge, received orders from MacArthur to "Get to Manila! Free the internees at Santo Tomas. Take Malacanang Palace and the Legislative Building."

On 31 January, the Eighth United States Army of Lt. Gen. Robert L. Eichelberger, including the 187th and 188th Glider Infantry Regiments of Col. Robert H. Soule and components of the U.S. 11th Airborne Division under Maj. Gen. Joseph Swing, landed unopposed at Nasugbu in southern Luzon and began moving north toward Manila. Meanwhile, the 11th Airborne's 511th Regimental Combat Team, commanded by Col. Orin D. "Hard Rock" Haugen, parachuted onto Tagaytay Ridge on 3 February. On 10 February, the 11th Airborne Division came under the command of the Sixth Army, and seized Fort William McKinley on 17 February

Swing was joined by the Hunters ROTC Filipino guerrillas, under the command of Lt. Col. Emmanuel V. de Ocampo, and by 5 February, his forces were on the outskirts of Manila.

=== Japanese defense ===
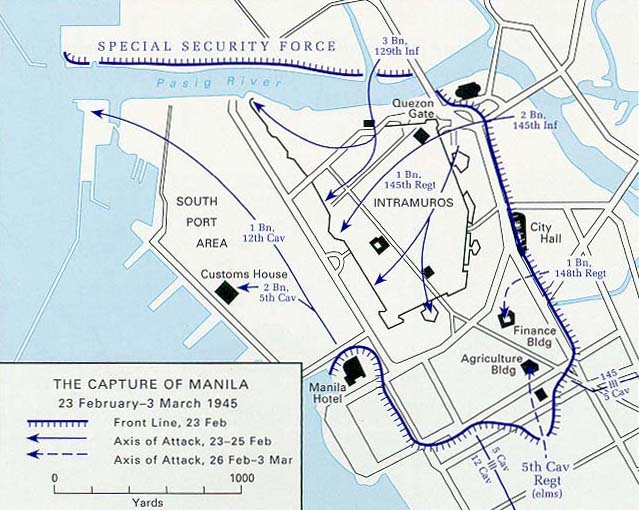
Map of the capture of Manila

As the Americans converged on Manila from different directions, they discovered that most of the Imperial Japanese Army troops defending the city had been withdrawn to Baguio on the orders of General Tomoyuki Yamashita, commander in chief of Japanese Army forces in the Philippines. Yamashita had planned to engage Filipino and U.S. forces in northern Luzon in a coordinated campaign of attrition, with the goal of buying time for defenses against an Allied invasion to be constructed on the Japanese home islands. He had three main force groupings under his command: 80,000 men of the "Shimbu Group" in the mountains east of Manila, 30,000 of the "Kembu Group" in the hills north of Manila, and 152,000 of the "Shobu Group" in northeastern Luzon.

Yamashita decided not to declare Manila an open city, as General Douglas MacArthur had done before its capture by Japanese forces in 1941. This was based on concerns that doing so would tarnish the "fighting spirit" of the Japanese military, not because Yamashita intended to seriously defend the city; he did not think that he could feed the city's one million residents, and doubted his forces' ability to defend a large area with vast tracts of flammable wooden buildings. While not planning to fight over Manila itself, Yamashita did order the commander of "Shimbu Group", Gen. Shizuo Yokoyama, to destroy all bridges and other vital installations in the area and then evacuate his men from the city as soon as American troops arrived in force.

In spite of these orders, Rear Admiral Sanji Iwabuchi, commander of the Imperial Japanese Navy's 31st Naval Special Base Force, was determined to fight a last-ditch battle in Manila. Though nominally part of the Shimbu Group, Iwabuchi repeatedly ignored orders to withdraw from the city. The naval staff in Japan agreed to Iwabuchi's scheme, subverting Yamashita's attempts to confront the Americans with a concerted, unified defense. Iwabuchi had 12,500 men under his command, designated as the Manila Naval Defense Force, augmented by 4,500 IJA personnel under Col. Katsuzo Noguchi and Capt. Saburo Abe. These units built extensive defensive positions in the city, including inside the 16th-century fortress of Intramuros, cut down the palm trees on Dewey Blvd. to form a runway, and set up barricades across major streets. Iwabuchi split his command into a Northern Force under Noguchi and a Southern Force under Capt. Takusue Furuse.

Iwabuchi had been in command of the battleship Kirishima and survived when she was sunk by American forces off Guadalcanal in 1942, which was perceived as a stain on his honor as an officer and may have motivated him to fight to the death. Before the battle began, he issued an address to his men:

We are very glad and grateful for the opportunity of being able to serve our country in this epic battle. Now, with what strength remains, we will daringly engage the enemy. Banzai to the Emperor! We are determined to fight to the last man.

== Battle ==
=== Santo Tomas internees liberated ===
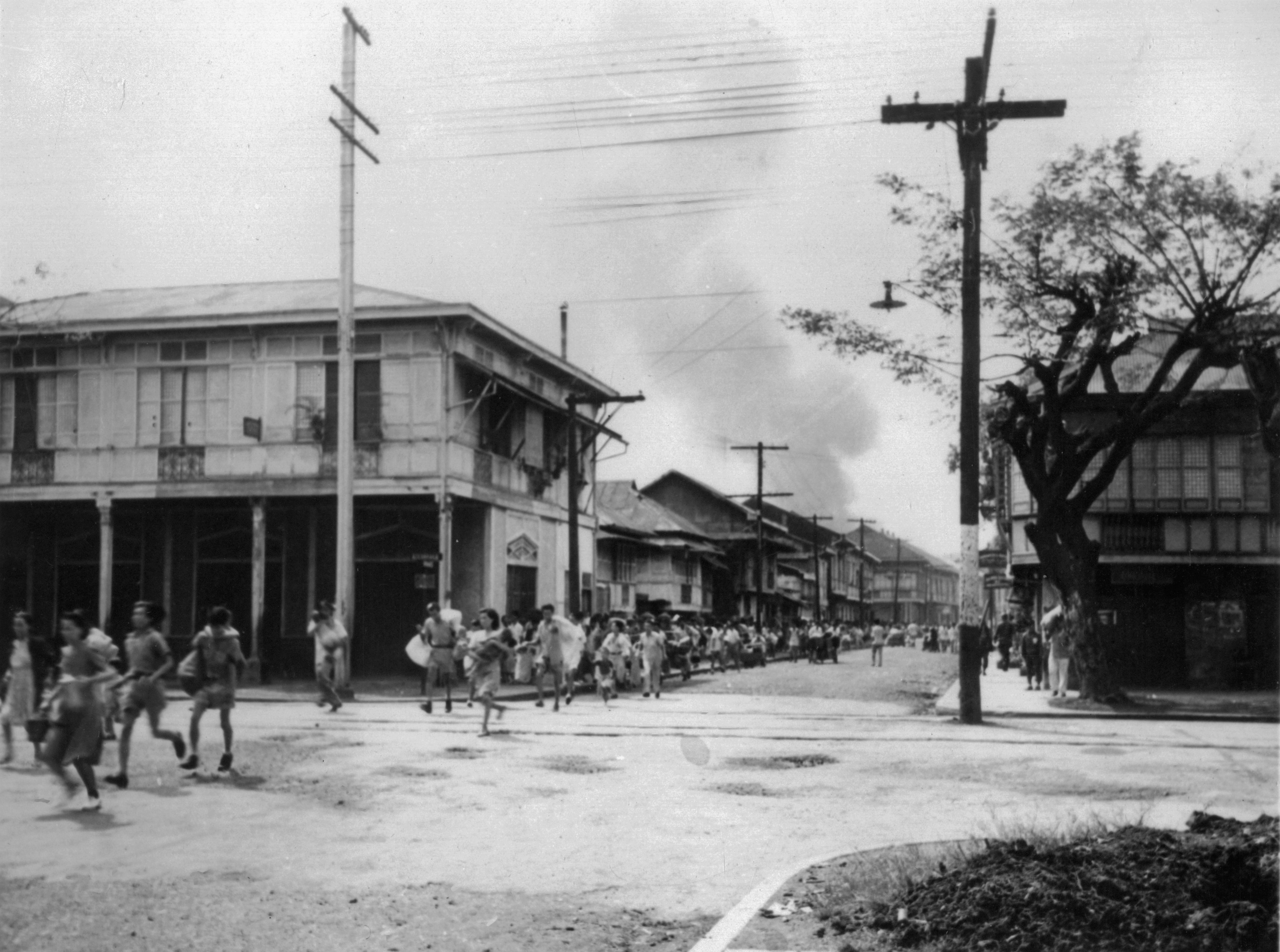
Citizens of Manila run for safety from suburbs burned by Japanese soldiers, 10 February 1945

On 3 February, elements of the 1st Cavalry Division under Maj. Gen. Verne D. Mudge pushed into the northern outskirts of Manila and seized a vital bridge across the Tullahan River separating them from the city proper, then quickly captured Malacanang Palace. A squadron of Brig. Gen. William C. Chase's 8th Cavalry, the first unit to arrive in the city, began a drive toward the sprawling campus of the University of Santo Tomas. The university had been converted by the Japanese into the Santo Tomas Internment Camp, designed to hold both civilians and the U.S. Army and Navy nurses colloquially known as the "Angels of Bataan".

For 37 months since 4 January 1942, the university's main building had been used to incarcerate civilians, mainly Filipinos and Americans. Out of 4,255 prisoners, 466 died in captivity, three were killed while attempting to escape on 15 February 1942, and one made a successful breakout in early January 1945.

Capt. Manuel Colayco, a USAFFE guerrilla officer, became a notable Allied casualty during Manila's liberation after he and Lt. Diosdado Guytingco successfully guided the American First Cavalry to the front gate of Santo Tomas. Colayco was hit by Japanese small arms fire and died seven days later in Legarda Elementary School, which became a field hospital during the battle. At 9 PM, five tanks of the 44th Tank Battalion, headed by "Battlin' Basic", breached the compound.

The Japanese garrison in the compound, under Lt. Col. Toshio Hayashi, gathered the remaining internees together in the Education Building as hostages and exchanged intermittent fire with the approaching Allied forces. The next day, on 5 February, the Japanese negotiated a truce that allowed them to rejoin Japanese troops to the south of the city, carrying only individual small arms. Although they exited the compound safely, the Japanese were unaware that the area they requested to evacuate to was the now-American occupied Malacañang Palace; soon afterwards they were fired upon and several were killed, including Hayashi.

On 4 February, the 37th Infantry Division freed more than 1,000 prisoners of war held at Bilibid Prison, mostly former defenders of Bataan and the island of Corregidor, after the building was abandoned by Japanese troops.

=== Encirclement and massacres ===
Early on 6 February, General MacArthur announced that "Manila had fallen". In fact, the battle for Manila had barely begun. As MacArthur declared victory, the 1st Cavalry Division in the north and the 11th Airborne Division in the south were reporting stiffening Japanese resistance further into the city.

General Oscar Griswold continued to push elements of the XIV Corps south from Santo Tomas University toward the Pasig River. In the late afternoon of 4 February, he ordered the 2nd Squadron, 5th Cavalry Regiment, to seize Quezon Bridge, the only crossing over the Pasig that the Japanese had failed to demolish. As the squadron approached the bridge, Japanese heavy machine guns opened fire from a formidable roadblock on Quezon Boulevard, forcing the Americans to stop their advance and withdraw until nightfall. As the Americans and Filipinos pulled back, the Japanese blew up the bridge.

On 5 February, the 37th Infantry Division began to move into Manila, and Griswold divided the northern section of the city into two sectors. The 37th Infantry Division was responsible for advancing to the south, and the 1st Cavalry Division was responsible for conducting an envelopment to the east. The Americans secured the northern bank of the Pasig River by 6 February, and subsequently captured the city's water supply at the Novaliches Dam, Balara Water Filters, and the San Juan Reservoir.

On 7 February, General Beightler ordered the 148th Regiment to cross the Pasig River and clear Paco and Pandacan. The bitterest fighting for Manila – which proved costliest to the 129th Regiment – was in capturing the steam-driven power plant on Provisor Island, where Japanese troops held out until 11 February. By the afternoon of 8 February, 37th Division units had cleared most of Japanese units from their sector, but the residential districts were damaged extensively by the fighting. That same day, Filipino forces under Colonel Marcos V. Agustin cleared San Nicolas, where they arrested former Philippine President Emilio Aguinaldo at his residence for collaboration with the Japanese. The Japanese contributed to the destruction by demolishing buildings and military installations as they withdrew. Japanese resistance in Tondo and Malabon continued until 9 February.

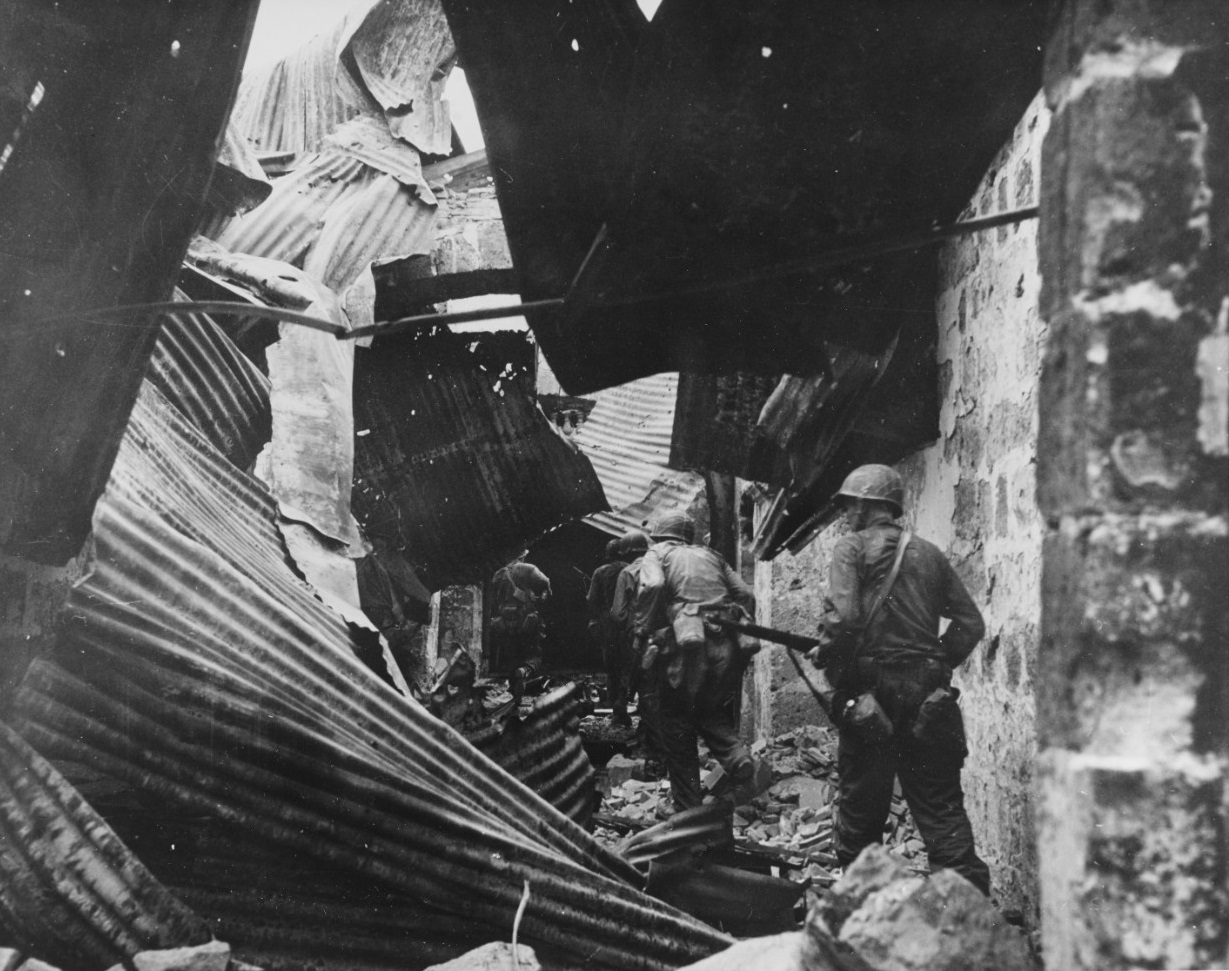
American infantrymen advancing though a ruined building in Manila, February 1945

In an attempt to protect the city and its civilian population, General MacArthur had largely forbade the use of U.S. artillery and air support, but by 9 February, American shelling had set fire to a number of districts. "If the city were to be secured without the destruction of the 37th and the 1st Cavalry Divisions, no further effort could be made to save buildings, everything holding up progress would be pounded." Iwabuchi's troops, having had some early success resisting American infantry assaults armed with flamethrowers, grenades and bazookas, soon faced direct fire from tanks, tank destroyers, and howitzers. These heavy weapons destroyed entire buildings, often killing both defending Japanese troops and civilians trapped inside without differentiation.

Subjected to incessant artillery fire and facing certain death or capture, and encouraged by their officers, Japanese troops began to target Filipino civilians within their lines with increasing frequency and cruelty, ultimately committing multiple acts of mass violence later would be known as the Manila massacre. Japanese units engaged in violent mutilations, rapes, and large-scale massacres of the civilian population as their positions became increasingly untenable. Massacres occurred in schools, hospitals and convents, including San Juan de Dios Hospital, Santa Rosa College, Santo Domingo Church, Manila Cathedral, Paco Church, St. Paul's Convent, and St. Vincent de Paul Church. Dr Antonio Gisbert recounted the murder of his father and brother at the Palacio del Gobernador, stating: "I am one of those few survivors, not more than 50 in all out of more than 3,000 men herded into Fort Santiago and, two days later, massacred."

The Japanese forced Filipino women and children to act as human shields, placing them on the front lines in an attempt to protect Japanese positions. Those who survived were often murdered by the Japanese.

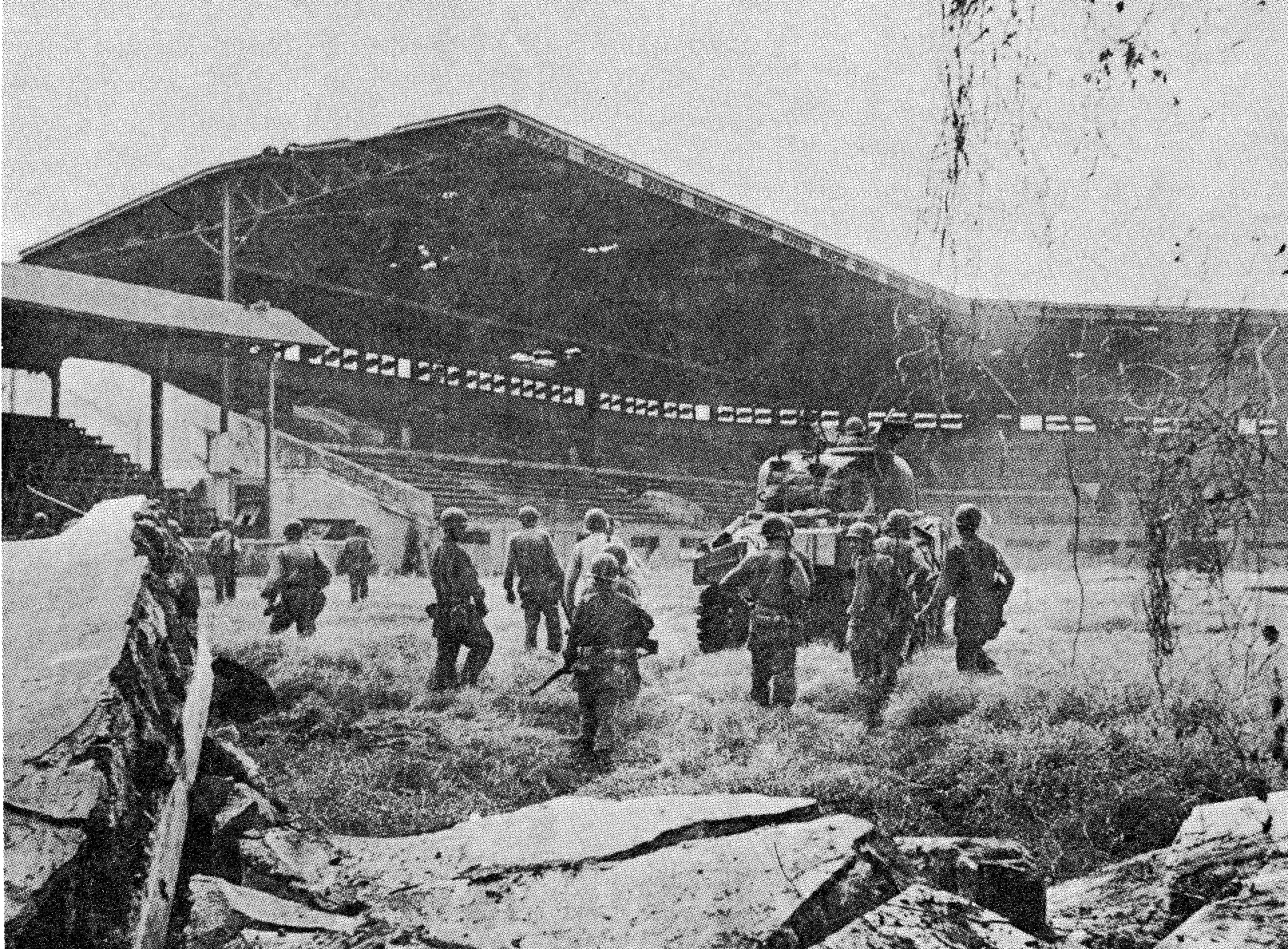
U.S. troops at the Rizal Baseball Stadium, Manila, 16 February 1945

By 12 February Iwabuchi's artillery and heavy mortars had been silenced, and with no contingency plan to withdraw or regroup, "each [Japanese soldier] had his meager supply of rations, barely sufficient arms and ammunition, and a building in which his life would end..." The 1st Cavalry Division reached Manila Bay on 12 February, but it was not until 18 February that it seized Rizal Stadium, which the Japanese had turned into an ammunition dump, and Fort San Antonio Abad. On 17 February, the 148th Regiment took the Philippine General Hospital, freeing 7,000 civilian held inside, along with the University of the Philippines Padre Faura campus, and Assumption College San Lorenzo's original Herran-Dakota campus.

Iwabuchi was ordered by General Shizuo Yokoyama, commander of the Shimbu Group, to break out of Manila on the night of 17–18 February, in coordination with counter-attacks on Novaliches Dam and Grace Park. The breakout attempt failed and Iwabuchi's remaining 6,000 men were trapped within a tightening perimeter.

By 20 February, the New Police Station, St. Vincent de Paul Church, San Pablo Church, the Manila Club, City Hall and the General Post Office had fallen into American hands. The Japanese retreated into the fortress of Intramuros on the night of 19 February, and the Manila Hotel was liberated on 22 February, where MacArthur found his former penthouse in ashes. Only the Intramuros fortress, plus the Legislative, Finance, and Agricultural Buildings, remained in Japanese hands.

=== Intramuros devastated ===
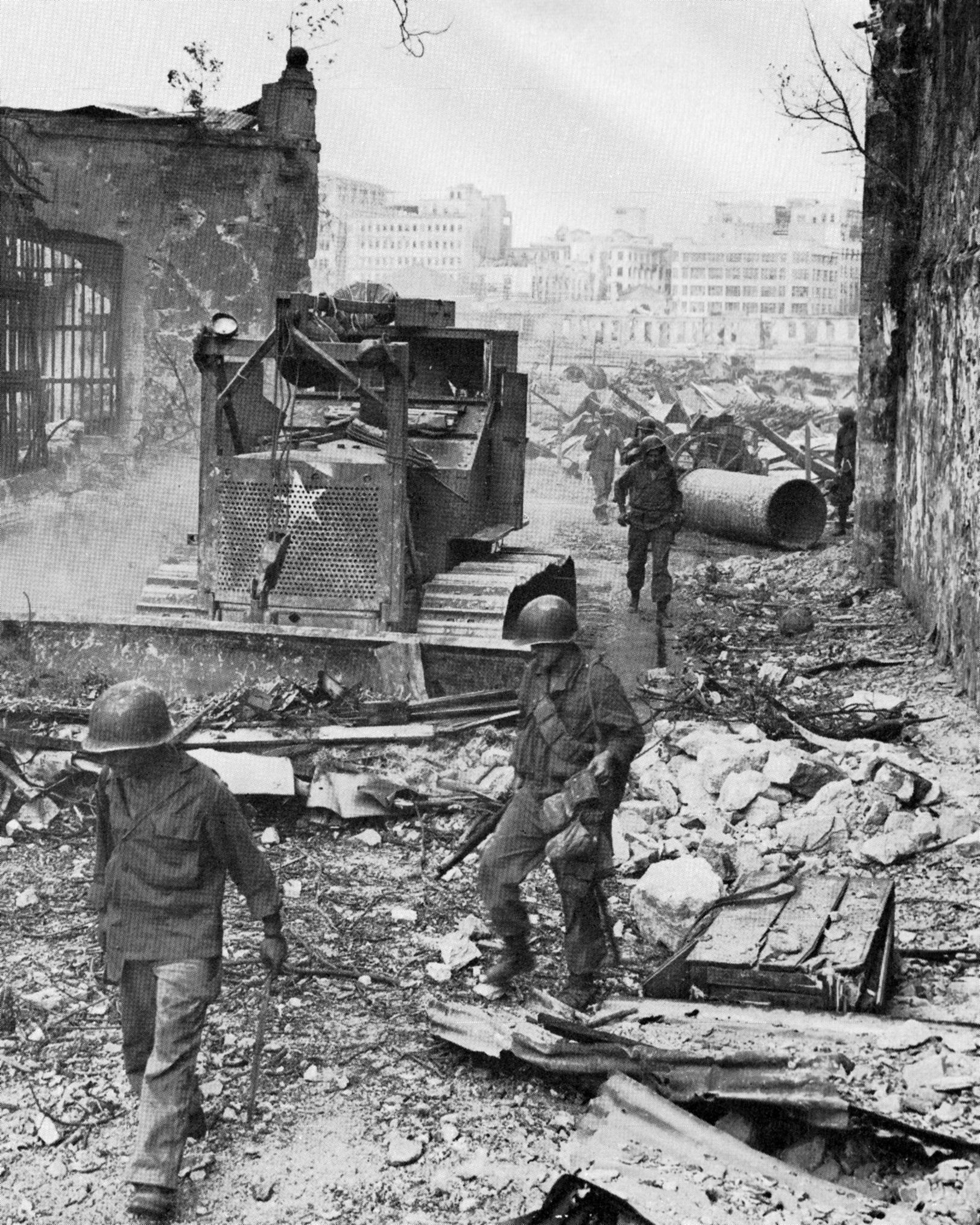
U.S. troops fighting in the Walled City, Manila, 27 February 1945

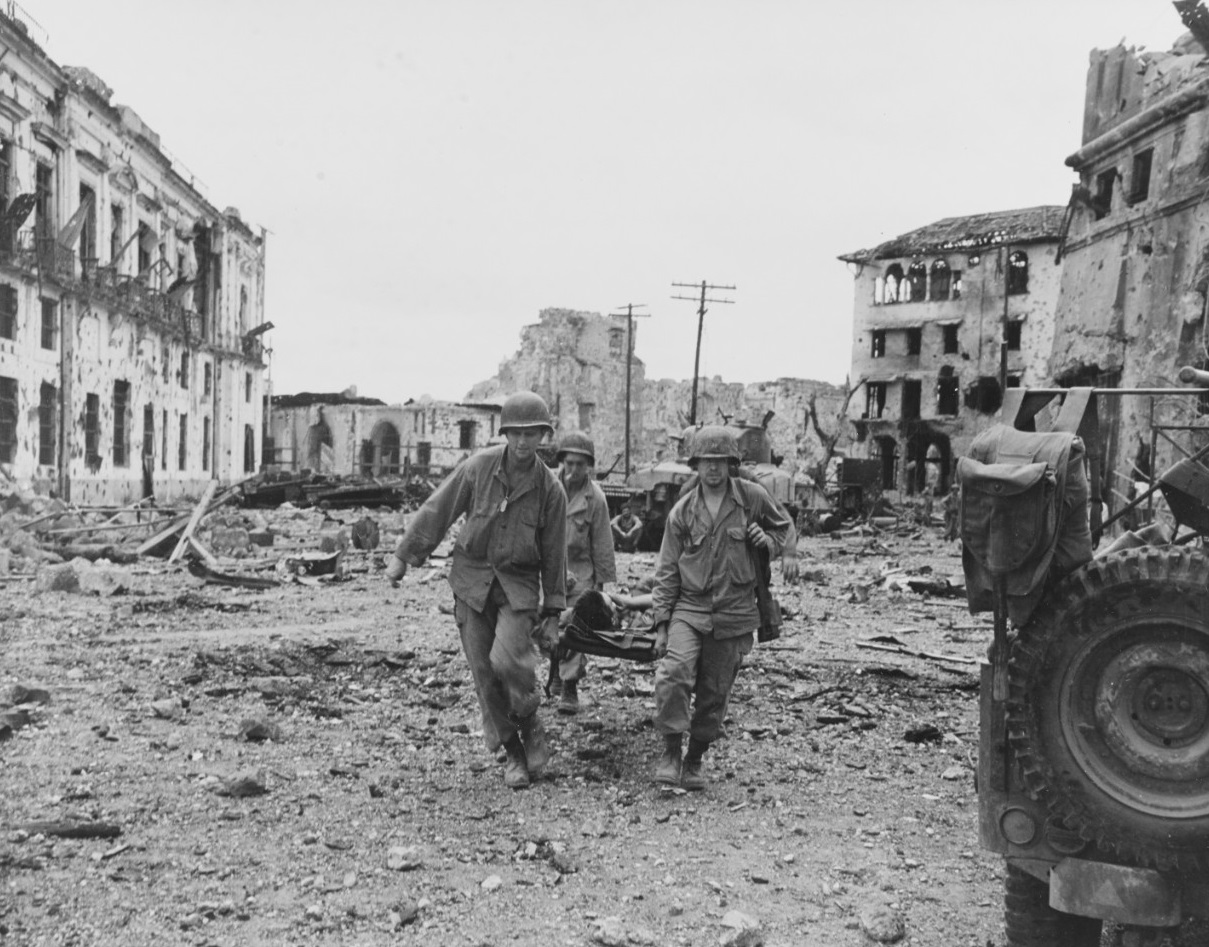
An American stretcher party carrying a wounded soldier through the ruins of Intramuros, 23 February 1945

The American assault on Intramuros began at 07:30 on 23 February with a 140-gun artillery barrage, followed by infantry from the 148th attacking through breaches made in the walls between the Quezon and Parian Gates. Elements of the 129th crossing the Pasig River, then engaged Japanese troops near the location of the Government Mint.

Intense fighting for Intramuros continued until 26 February. On 23 February, the Japanese released about 3,000 civilians held as hostages, after killing most of the men in the group. Colonel Noguchi's soldiers and sailors killed 1,000 men and women.

Iwabuchi and his officers committed suicide at dawn on 26 February. The 5th Cavalry Regiment took the Agricultural Building by 1 March, and the 148th Regiment took the Legislative Building on 28 Feb. and the Finance Building by 3 March.

Army Historian Robert R. Smith wrote: "Griswold and Beightler were not willing to attempt the assault with infantry alone. Not expressly enjoined from employing artillery, they now planned a massive artillery preparation that would last from 17 to 23 February and would include indirect fire at ranges up to 8,000 yards as well as direct, point-blank fire from ranges as short as 250 yards. They would employ all available corps and division artillery, from 240mm howitzers down. (...) Just how civilian lives could be saved by this type of preparation, as opposed to aerial bombardment, is unknown. The net result would be the same: Intramuros would be practically razed." "That the artillery had almost razed the ancient Walled City could not be helped. To the XIV Corps and the 37th Division at this state of the battle for Manila, American lives were understandably far more valuable than historic landmarks. The destruction stemmed from the American decision to save lives in a battle against Japanese troops who had decided to sacrifice their lives as dearly as possible."

According to one estimate, American military operations (specifically artillery bombardments) may have caused 40 percent of total non-combatant Filipino deaths during the battle.

Before the fighting ended, MacArthur summoned a provisional assembly of prominent Filipinos to Malacañang Palace declared the Commonwealth of the Philippines to be permanently reestablished. "My country kept the faith," he told the gathered assembly. "Your capital city, cruelly punished though it be, has regained its rightful place—citadel of democracy in the East."

== Aftermath ==
For the remainder of March 1945, American forces and Filipino guerrillas mopped up Japanese resistance throughout the city. With Intramuros secured on 4 March, Manila was officially liberated, although the city was almost completely destroyed and large areas had been demolished by American artillery fire. American forces suffered 1,010 dead and 5,565 wounded during the battle. At least 100,000 Filipino civilians had been killed, both deliberately by the Japanese in the various massacres, and from artillery and aerial bombardment by U.S. and Japanese forces. 16,665 Japanese military dead were counted within Intramuros alone.

In the following months, the 6th Army and Filipino guerrillas shifted towards their operations east of Manila to confront the Shimbu Group in mountain warfare in the Battle of Wawa Dam, and secure Manila's water sources.

In 1946, General Yamashita was executed for war crimes committed by Japanese forces under his command during the battle.

=== Destruction of the city ===
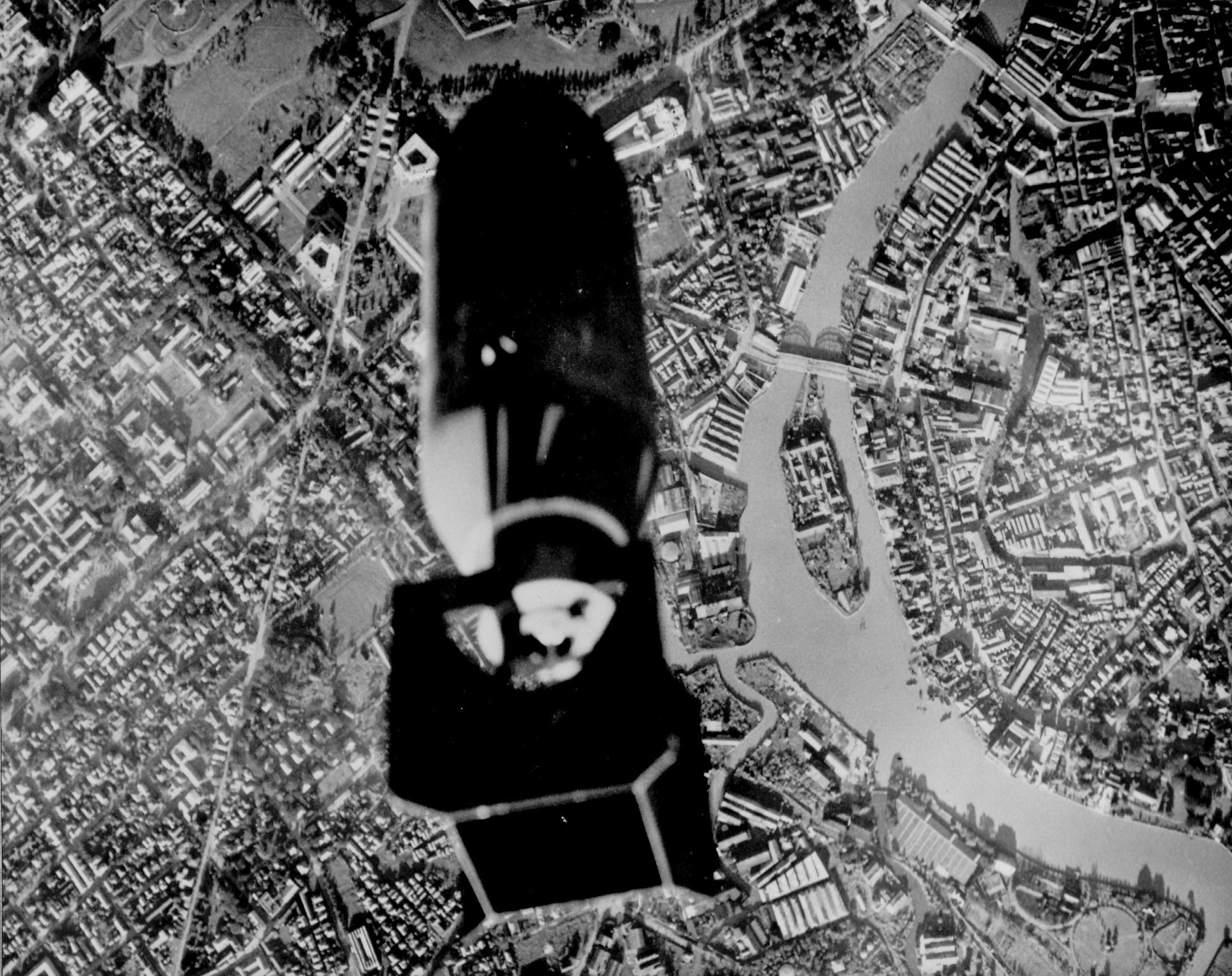
A TBF-1 Avenger dropping a bomb over Manila

The battle for Manila was both the first and the fiercest urban fighting experienced by American forces during the Pacific War. Few battles in the closing months of World War II exceeded the destruction and brutality of the fighting in Manila. In Manila's business district only two buildings remained undamaged, and both were looted of their plumbing.

Today, a steel flagpole still stands at the entrance of the old U.S. Embassy building in Ermita, pockmarked by bullets and shrapnel, and is seen as a testament to the intense, bitter fighting for Manila.

The people of the Philippines lost an irreplaceable cultural and historical treasure during the battle of Manila, and the destruction of the city is remembered today as a national tragedy in the Philippines. Hundreds of government buildings, universities and colleges, convents, monasteries and churches, and their accompanying treasures dating to the founding of the city were ruined or lost. The cultural heritage (including art, literature, and especially architecture) of the southern Pacific's first international melting pot – a confluence of Spanish, American and Asian cultures – was eviscerated. Manila, once touted as the "Pearl of the Orient" and famed as a living monument to the confluence of Asian and European cultures, was virtually wiped out.

Most of the buildings damaged during the fighting were demolished after the war, as part of the reconstruction of Manila. European style architecture from the Spanish and early American era was replaced with modern American style architecture. Only a few old buildings remain intact today.

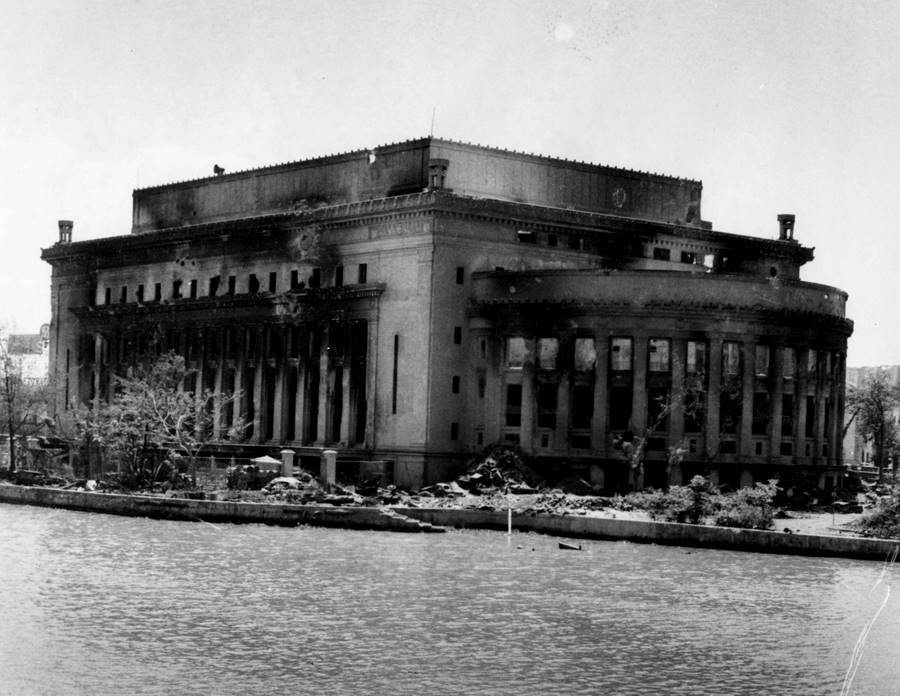
The burned out Manila Central Post Office

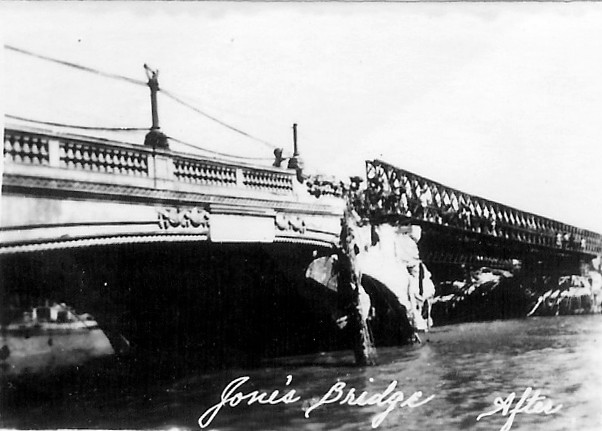
Jones Bridge after the liberation

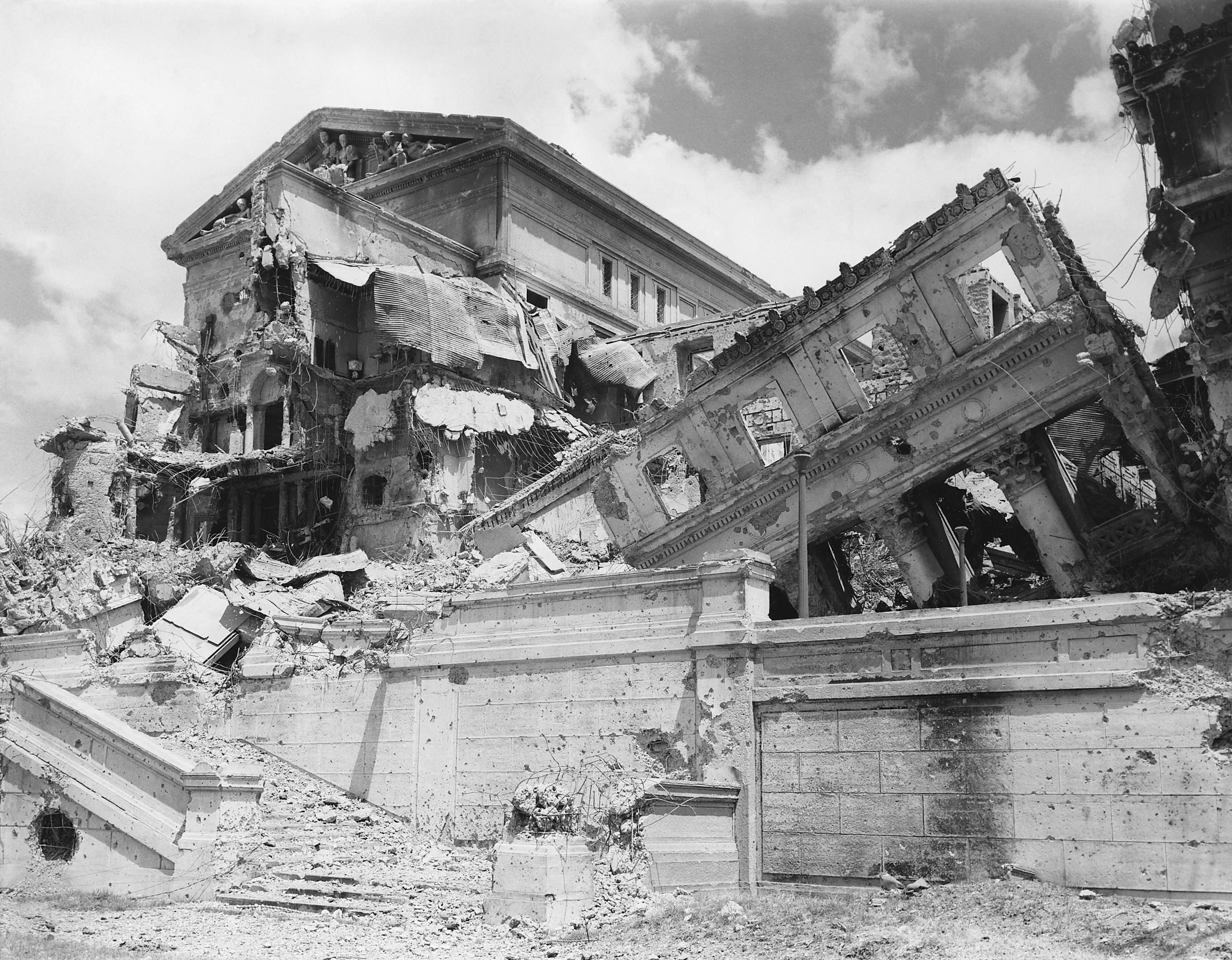
Like many other buildings in Manila, the Legislative Building was not spared from heavy shelling and bombing

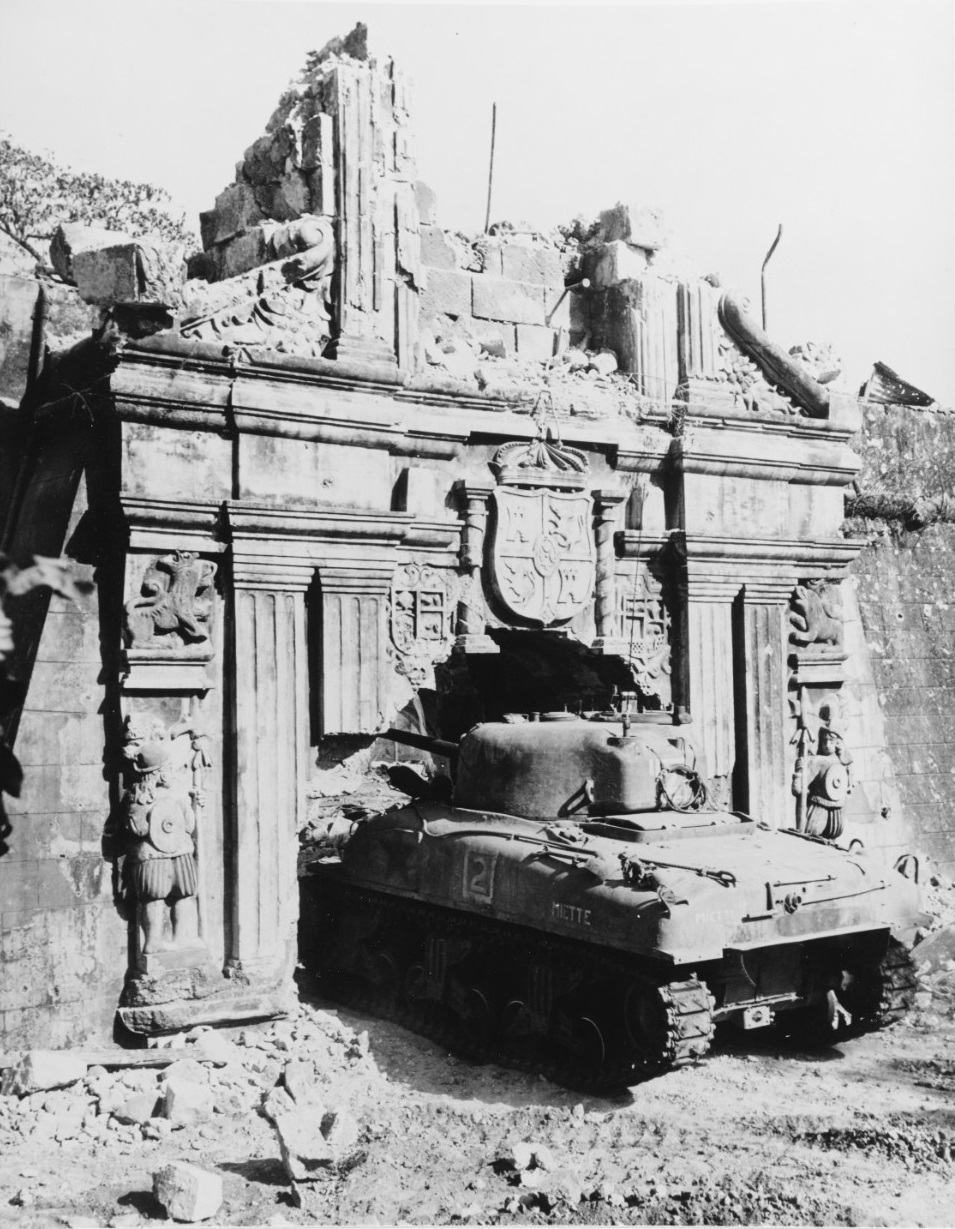
An M4 Sherman tank entering the ruins of Fort Santiago

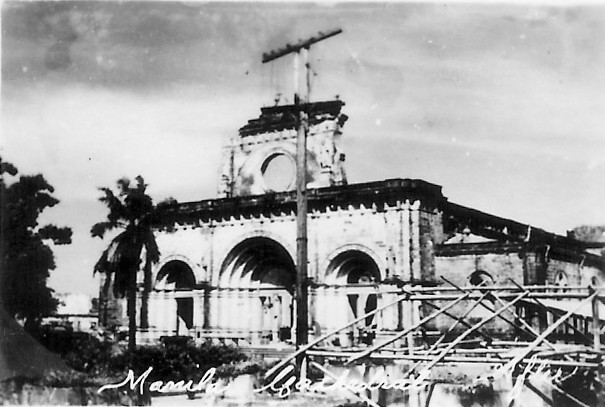
The ruins of Manila Cathedral after the war

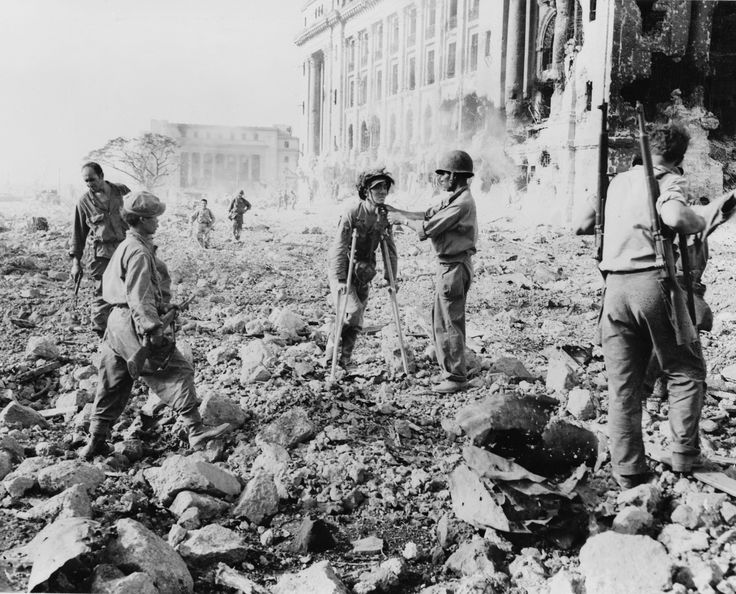
Japanese Imperial forces wounded surrender to US and Filipino soldiers under the United States Army and Philippine Commonwealth Army in unidentified city in Manila, May 1945.

== Commemoration ==
On 18 February 1995, the Memorare-Manila 1945 Foundation dedicated a memorial called the Shrine of Freedom to honor the memory of the over 100,000 civilians killed in the battle. It is also known as the Memorare Manila Monument and is located at Plazuela de Santa Isabel in Intramuros. The inscription for the memorial was penned by National Artist for Literature Nick Joaquin and reads:

"This memorial is dedicated to all those innocent victims of war, many of whom went nameless and unknown to a common grave, or even never knew a grave at all, their bodies having been consumed by fire or crushed to dust beneath the rubble of ruins."

"Let this monument be the gravestone for each and every one of the over 100,000 men, women, children and infants killed in Manila during its battle of liberation, 3 February – 3 March 1945. We have not forgotten them, nor shall we ever forget."

"May they rest in peace as part now of the sacred ground of this city: the Manila of our affections."

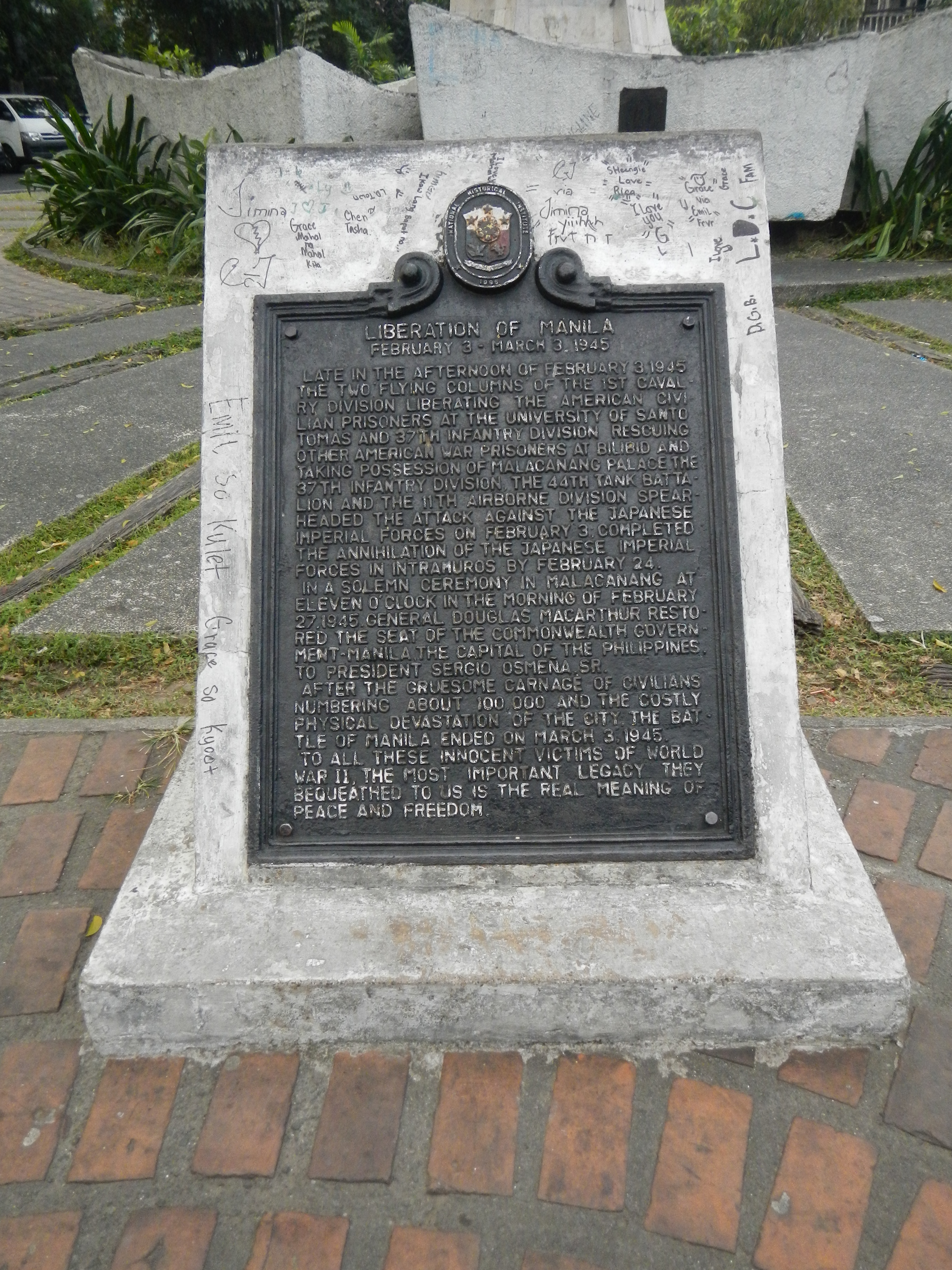
Battle of Manila (1945) Historical Marker, Malacañang Palace

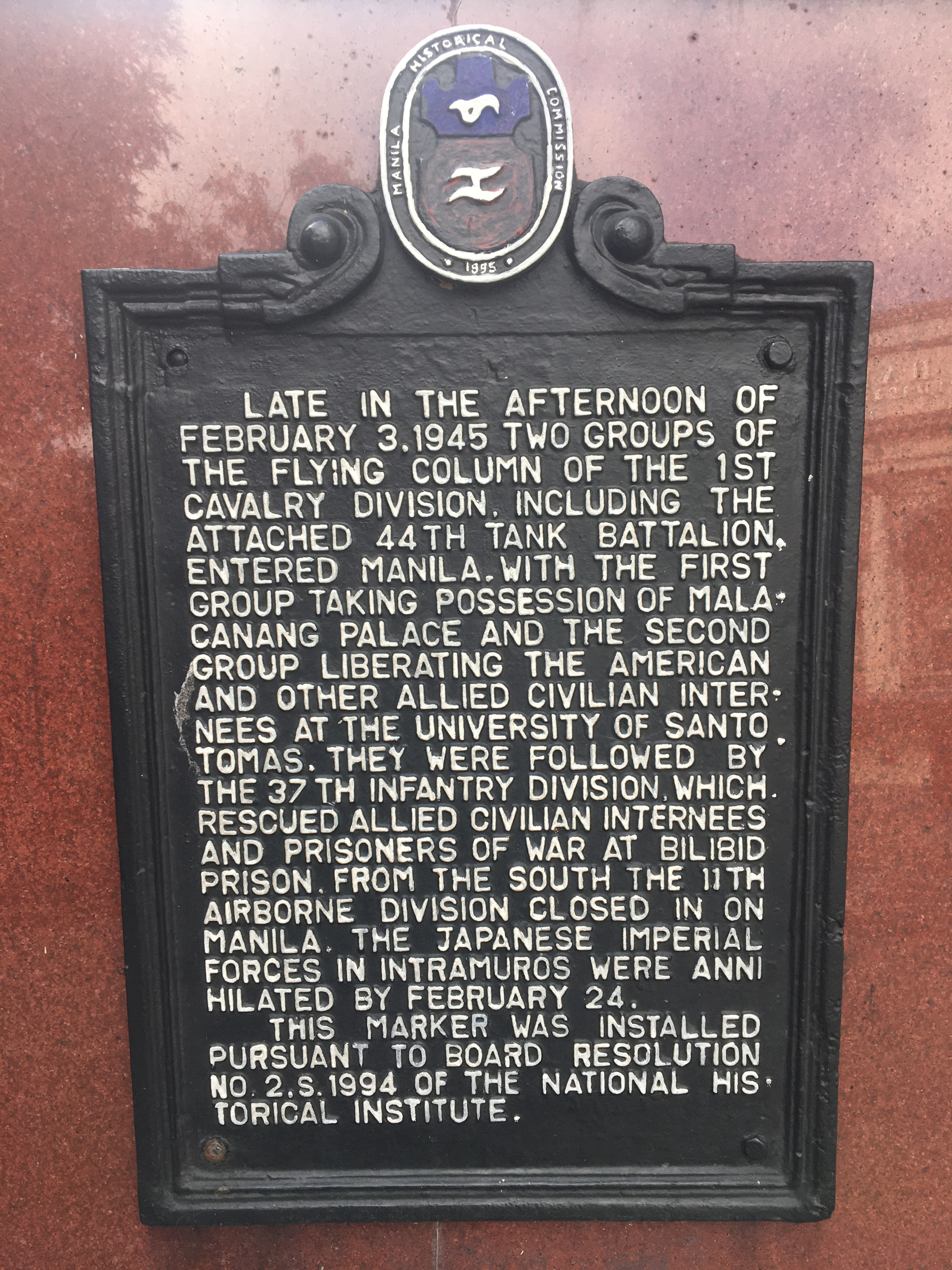
Battle of Manila Historical Marker installed in Freedom Triangle Plaza, Manila City Hall

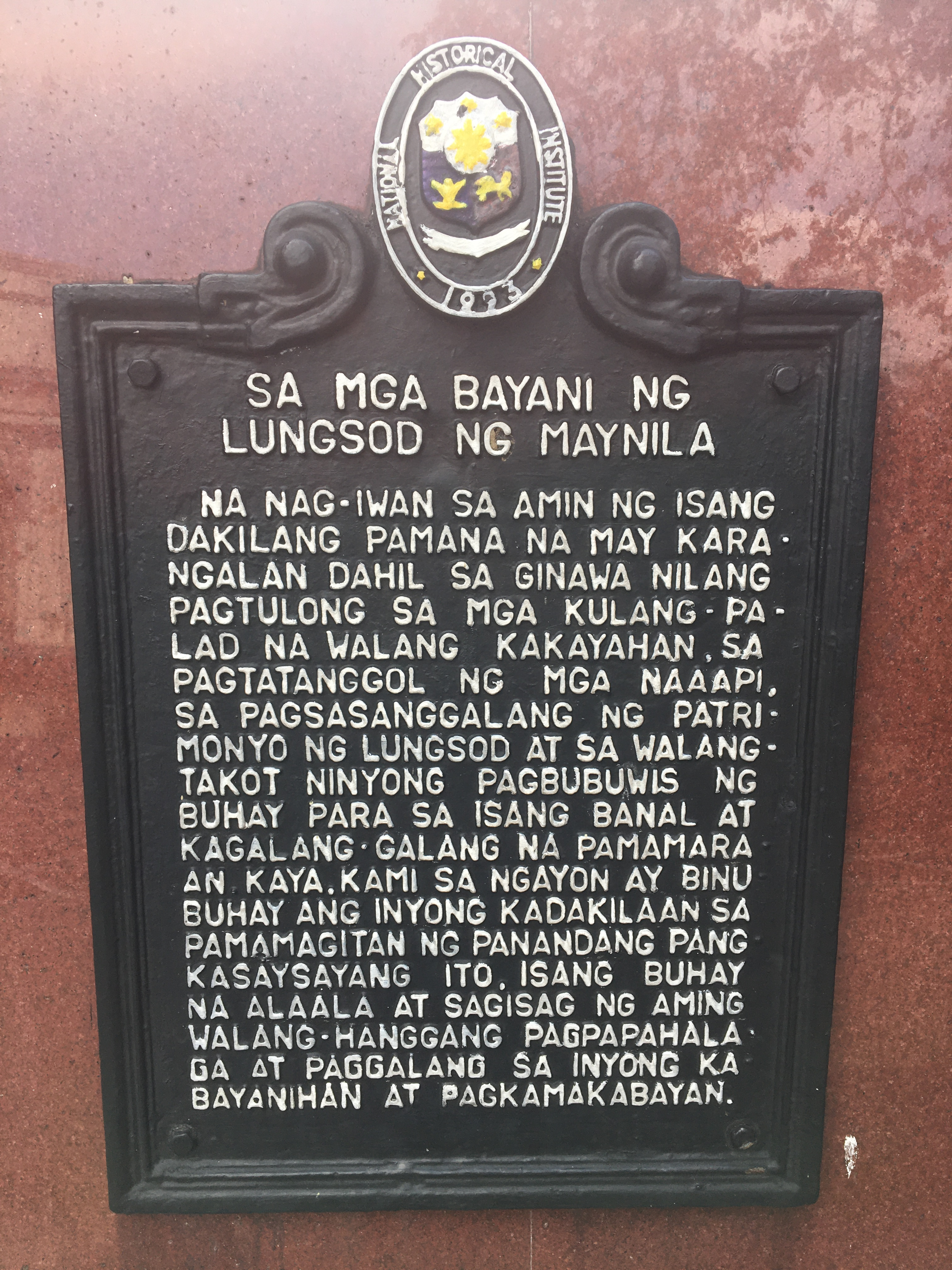
Battle of Manila Commemorative Marker in Filipino Language

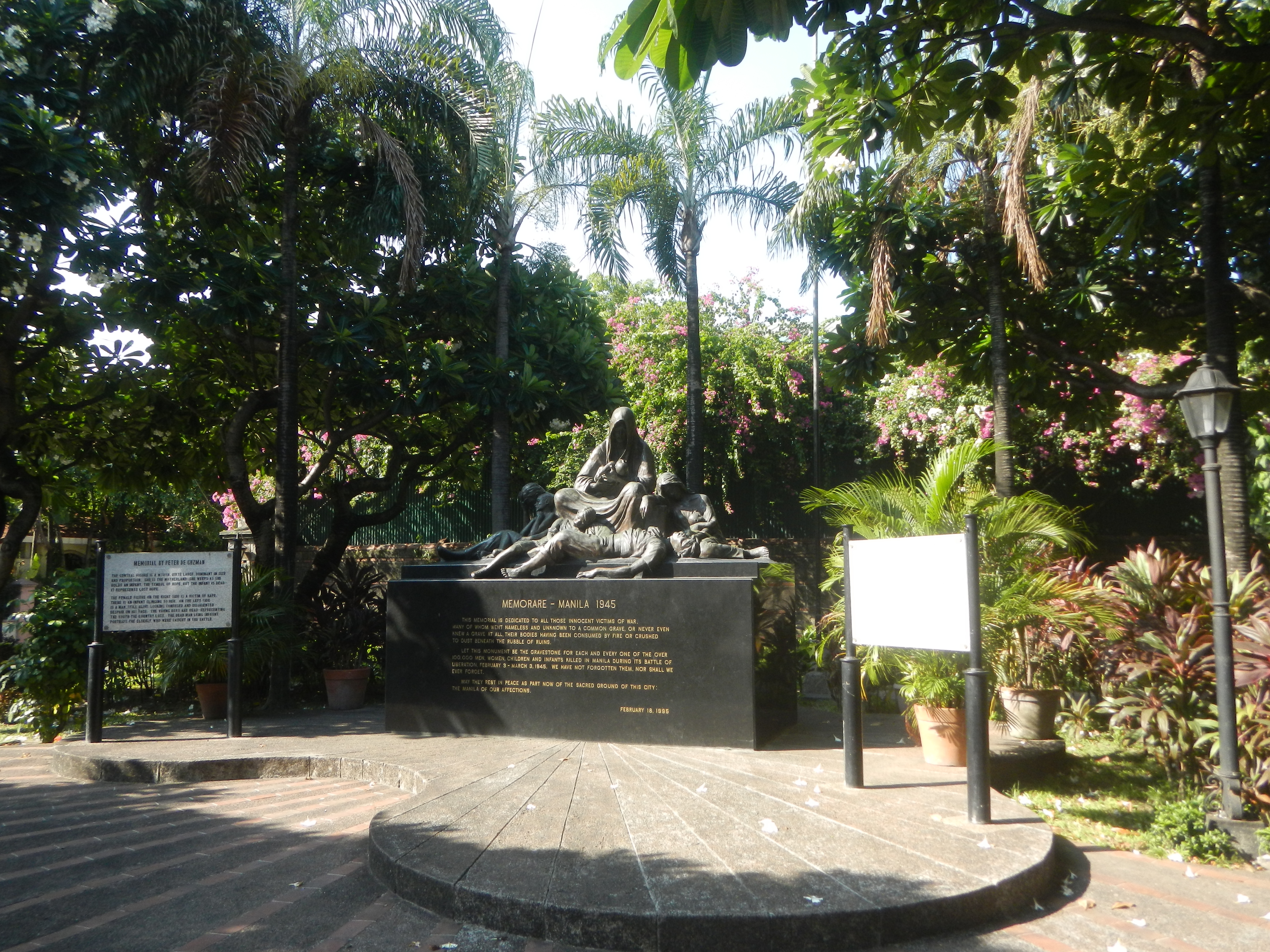
Memorare Manila at Plazuela de Santa Isabel

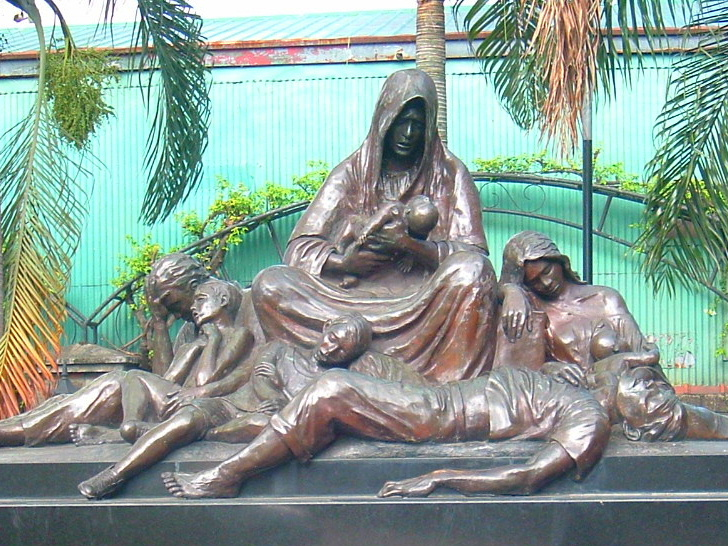
Memorare Manila Monument

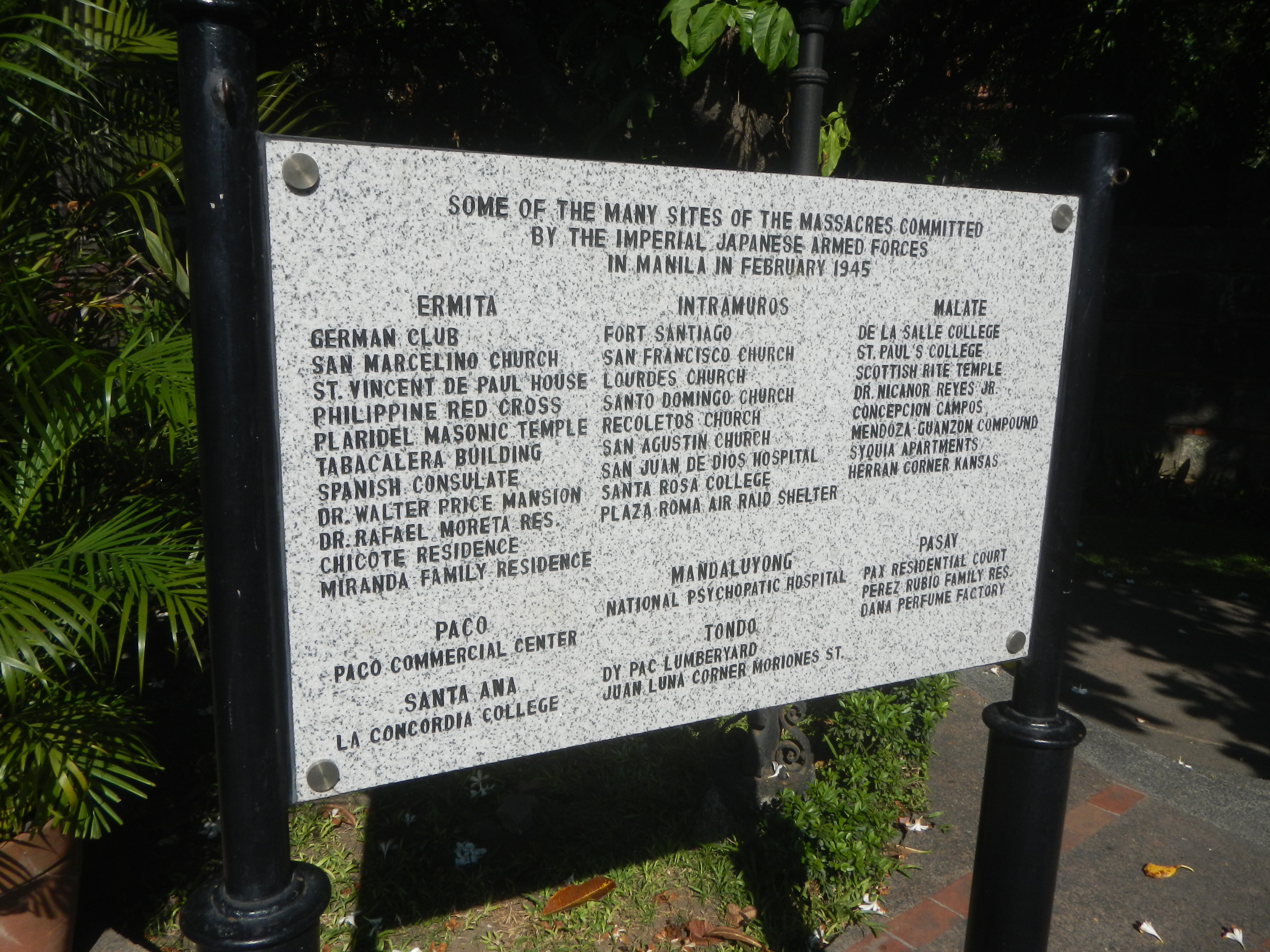
List of documented sites where Japanese massacres occurred during the battle

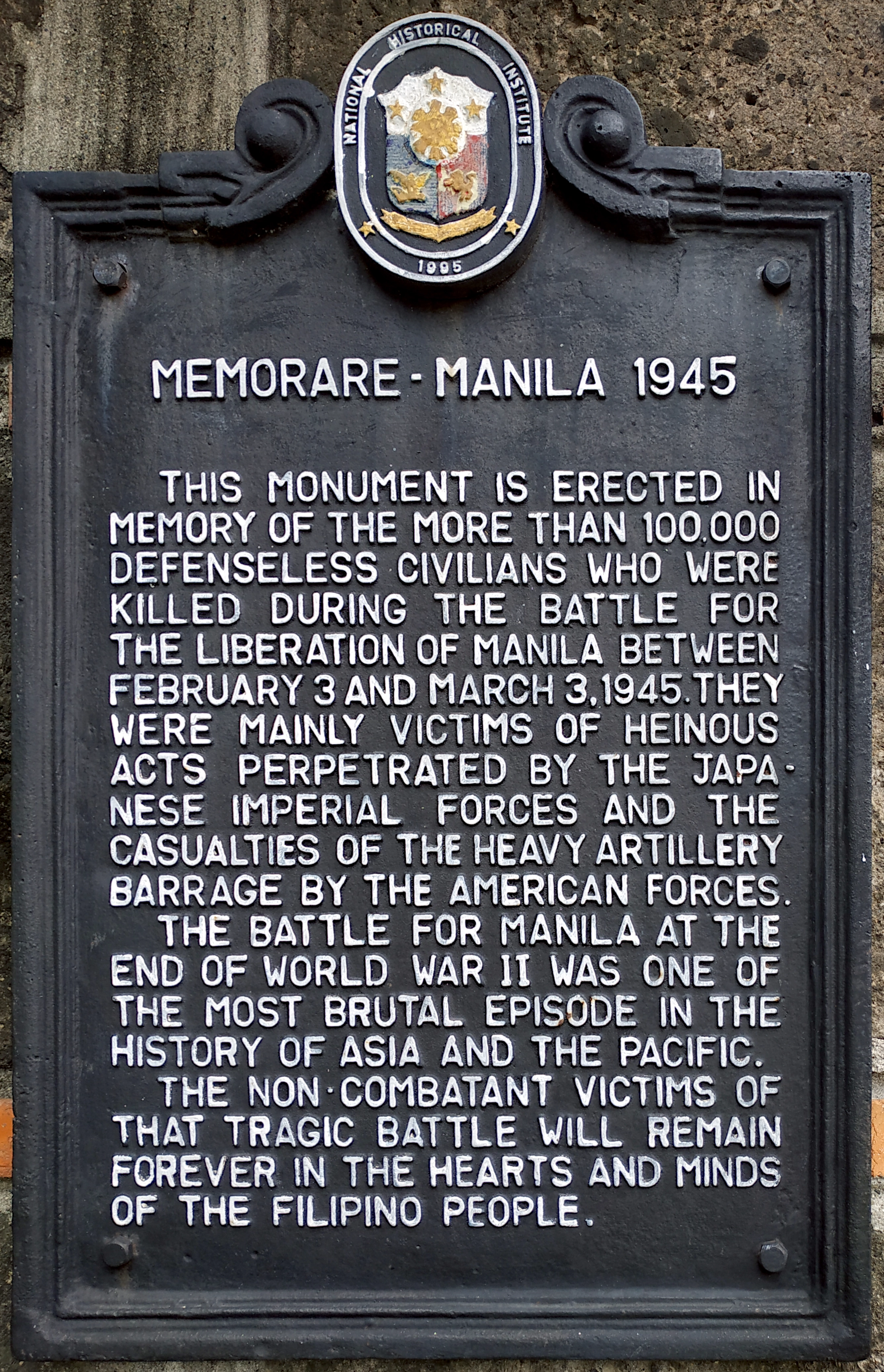
Memorare Manila 1945 Historical Marker

== See also ==
- Battle of Bataan (1945)
- Manila massacre
- History of the Philippines
- Military history of Japan
- Military history of the Philippines during World War II
- Military history of the United States

== Bibliography ==
- Battle of Manila Footnotes: Battle for Manila by Richard Connaughton, John Pimlott and Duncan Anderson (2002) Presidio Press ISBN 0-89141-771-0
- World War II in the Pacific: An Encyclopedia (Military History of the United States) by S. Sandler (2000) Routledge ISBN 0-8153-1883-9
- By sword and fire: The Destruction of Manila in World War II, 3 February – 3 March 1945 (Unknown Binding) by Alphonso J. Aluit (1994) National Commission for Culture and the Arts ISBN 971-8521-10-0
- History of United States Naval Operations in World War II. Vol. 13: The Liberation of the Philippines—Luzon, Mindanao, the Visayas, 1944–1945 by Samuel Eliot Morison (2002) University of Illinois Press ISBN 0-252-07064-X
