= Battle of Wawa Dam =

1945 battle in the Philippines Campaign of World War II

- Part of the Philippines Campaign of World War II
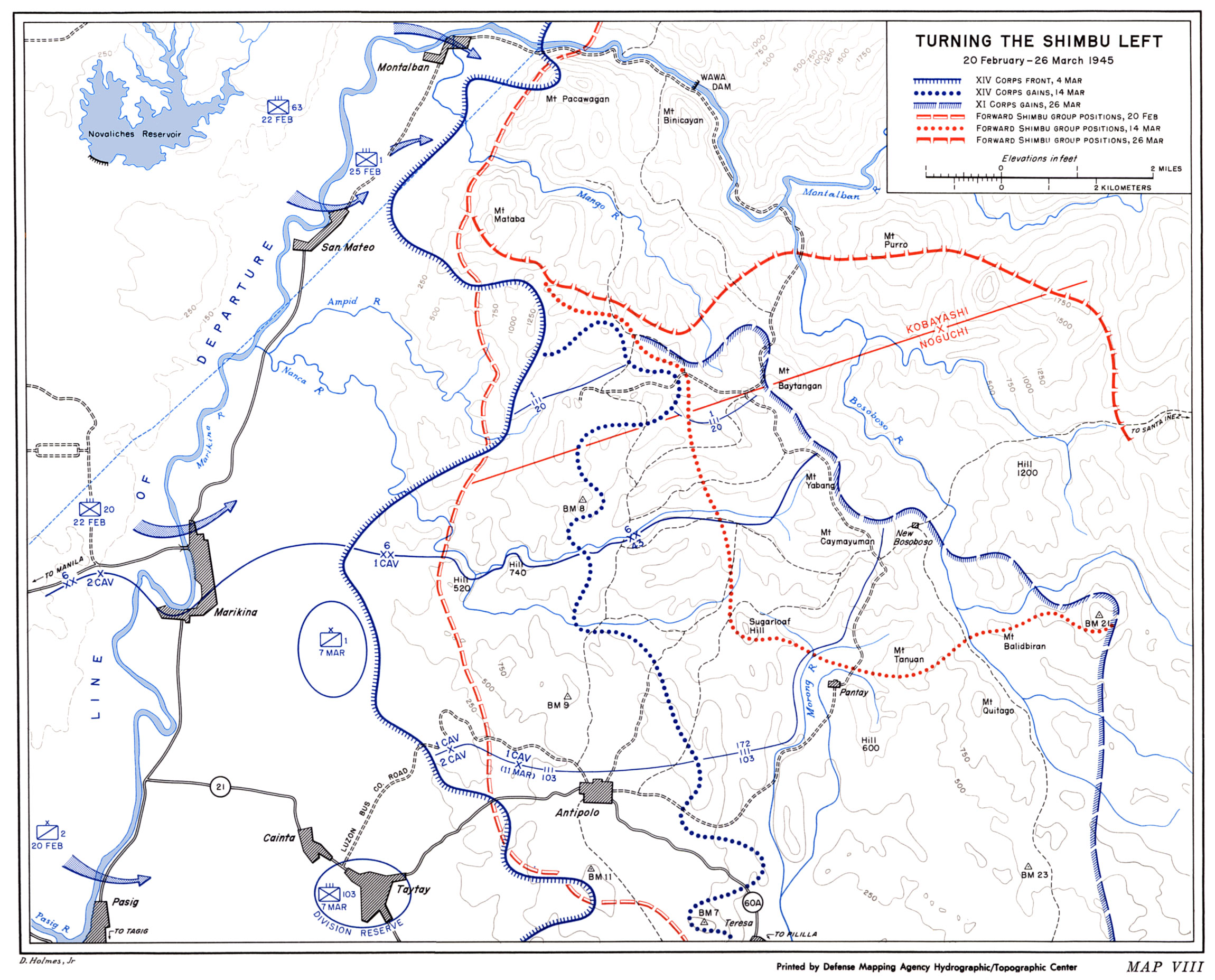
- Sixth Army advances on Shimbu Group east of Manila
Date	February 20–May 31, 1945
Location	Montalban, Rizal, Philippines 14°43′40″N 121°11′30″E
Result	Allied victory

Belligerents
United States: Commonwealth of the Philippines	Japan: Second Philippine Republic

Commanders and leaders
(United States) Douglas MacArthur (United States) Walter Krueger (United States) Oscar Griswold (United States) Charles P. Hall (Commonwealth of the Philippines) Yay Panlilio	(Empire of Japan) Tomoyuki Yamashita (Empire of Japan) Shizuo Yokoyama (Empire of Japan) Takashi Kobayashi (Empire of Japan) Osamu Kawashimai (Empire of Japan) Susumu Noguchi

Units involved
Ground units: Sixth Army: XIV Corps; 6th Infantry Division; 43rd Infantry Division; 1st Cavalry Division; 112th Cavalry Regiment; XI Corps; 37th Infantry Division; 38th Infantry Division; (Commonwealth of the Philippines) Filipino Guerilla Forces; Marking Guerrillas; Hunters ROTC; Air units: Fifth Air Force; 1st Marine Aircraft Wing; Marine Aircraft Group 24; Marine Aircraft Group 32	Ground units: (Empire of Japan) Shimbu Group; Kawabuchi Force; Kobayashi Force; 62nd Infantry Division; Noguchi Force; Naval units: Imperial Japanese Navy; Manila Naval Defense Group; 3rd Naval Battalion; 4th Naval Battalion

Strength
40,000	30,000

Casualties and losses
Filipino and U.S. forces 315 killed 1,010 wounded	Imperial Japanese military ~ 7,000 killed

The Battle of Wawa Dam (Filipino: Labanan sa Dam ng Wawa), also known as the Seizure of Wawa Dam (Filipino: Pag-agaw sa Dam ng Wawa), was a subsidiary action of the Battle of Manila to secure the vital water sources east of the capital. It was the longest continuous combat during the Liberation of the Philippines, lasting from February 20–May 31, 1945. It also proved critical in neutralizing the Imperial Japanese Army's Shimbu Group, which controlled the Sierra Madre mountain range east of Manila in Southern Luzon.

== Background ==
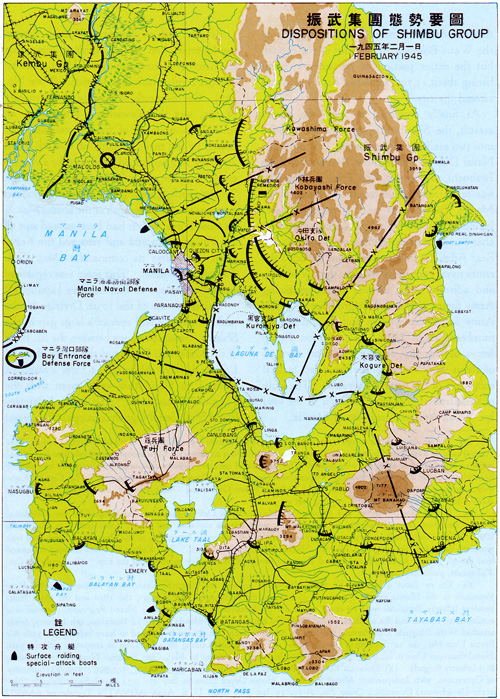
Disposition of Shimbo Group forces February 1945.

After securing Bataan during the Liberation of the Philippines, the Sixth United States Army under Gen. Walter Krueger was tasked by Gen. Douglas MacArthur on February 7, 1945, to secure the hills east of Manila while moving for a pincer action on the capital with the Eighth United States Army. The objective was to secure the critical water source of Manila beginning at the Novaliches Reservoir 16 km northeast of Manila, Wawa Dam on the Marikina River in Rizal, and Ipo Dam on the Angat River in Bulacan. Krueger tasked Gen. Oscar Griswold's XIV Corps on this objective.

The Imperial Japanese Army in the Philippines under Gen. Tomoyuki Yamashita was split into 3 major forces to pin down the American and Philippine forces. The largest, Shobu Group, under Yamashita, with 152,000 troops would hold the Cordillera Mountains, Kembu Group with 30,000 troops would hold the Zambales Mountains covering Fort Stotsenburg and Bataan Peninsula, and finally the Shimbu Group covering Manila, the Sierra Madre mountain range, and Bicol Peninsula.

The Shimbu Group under Gen. Shizuo Yokoyama would have three forces to hold east of Manila. The Kawashima Force under Gen. Osama Kawashima with 9,000 troops would hold Ipo Dam and surrounding areas north of Montalban, the Kobayashi Force under Gen. Takashi Kobayashi with 12,000 troops would be tasked to hold the center line around San Mateo and Wawa Dam, and the Noguchi Force under Gen. Katsuzo Noguchi with 9,000 troops would protect the southern area around Antipolo.

== Battle ==
=== Approach ===
On February 6, the 1st Cavalry Division was able to secure the Novaliches Reservoir. Japanese forces under Gen. Yokoyama were able to secure the Balara Filteration Station, and were planning to sabotage the vital facility that provided water to Manila. With the help of the Marine Aircraft Group 24 and 32, the 1st Cavalry was able to neutralize the Japanese troops on February 7. A Japanese counterattack was attempted once more on the Balara Station on February 11, but the saboteurs were neutralized after they were able to destroy one of the valves.

Massive counterattacks were launched by the Shimbu Group across the front on February 17. During the intense fighting, Manila Naval Defense Forces units stationed in Fort McKinley, the 3rd and 4th Naval Battalions, numbering about 1,900 troops were able to evacuate and join the Shimbu Forces in Antipolo. This has effectively left Adm. Shanji Iwabuchi and 12,000 in western Manila cut-off from the rest of the Shimbu Group. The naval forces corralled in Antipolo swelled to 9,000 troops were now placed under Capt. Takesue Furuse. Furuse was later directed to bring his forces to Infanta on the eastern seaboard of Tayabas province.

On February 20, 1945, with the 7th Cavalry Regiment of the 1st Cavalry began crossing to the east bank of the Marikina River at Taytay. The next two days American units fanned out across the line before the foothills of the Sierra Madres facing the Noguchi Force which concentrated around Antipolo.

Japanese forces created a network of tunnels and artillery sites with strong points at Mounts Oro, Pacawagan, Mataba, and Yabang. These tunnels and caves would have retractable 105mm and 155mm artillery pieces which would cover the Marikina Valley and lower hills, and would be supported by machine gun nests. Such fortifications were manned by about 25 Japanese troops.

The American and Philippine forces learning from the New Guinea and Solomon Island campaigns relied on aerial and ground assaults on these strong points. US Army 5th Air Force pilots “skip bombed” these tunnels by releasing their napalm bombs at a low altitude, and bounce the bombs into the cave entrance. This followed by ground troops shooting high explosive shells, white phosphorus mortars, and flamethrower units.

This tactic proved to be highly effective, but still bogged down American forces on each hill for days and event at times weeks. On one instance for a two-day campaign alone, the 2nd Cavalry Brigade took 137 caves and blew up 446 outlets.

=== Liberation of Antipolo ===
The assault towards Antipolo began with an intensive two-day artillery and aerial bombardment of the southern area of the front. By March 8, Gen. Griswold commenced the ground attack on Antipolo utilizing the 6th Infantry Division on the north and the 1st Cavalry Division on direct approach from Taytay with the help of the Marking Guerrillas and Hunters ROTC, completing the task by March 11 with a strong push to the east towards Mount Baytangan, and forcing Noguchi to withdraw to his second line of defense. The 1st Cavalry's actions in Antipolo drove a wedge between the Noguchi Force and Kobayashi Force at the expense of 295 casualties, while the Noguchi Force had 3,300 casualties. The following day, March 12, the 1st Cavalry was relieved of its duties in Antipolo and moved towards clearing Batangas and the Bicol Region. One of the casualties of the 1st Cavalry Division was their own division commander, Maj. Gen. Verne Mudge, who during the fighting on March was seriously wounded by a Japanese with a grenade, and replaced by Brig. Gen. Hugh F.T. Hoffman. The attending physician who stabilized Mudge was Dr. James Brownlee Johnson who discovered the use of blood plasma, and who later on would save Hideki Tojo's life after his attempted suicide during the Tokyo War Crimes Trials.

On March 12, in a concerted effort a Japanese formation of four reserve battalions of the Kobayashi Force attempted a counterattack on south of Wawa Dam. This was complimented by actions on Mount Yabang by one battalion from the Noguchi Force, as well as two battalions south of Ipo Dam. The counterattack was promptly repulsed by American forces.

Meanwhile, the 6th Division faced stiff resistance from their low position in the Marikina Valley towards Montalban, focusing on the capture of Mount Pacawagan and Mount Mataba. The former would provide a commanding view of the Marikina Valley and the Wawa Gorge, while Mount Mataba would be the second objective that would link the effort from Antipolo to Wawa Dam. The fighting was stiff, with the 6th Infantry Division only gaining a foothold on both mountains and later on had to give up the positions due to stiff resistance. Four battalions on March 12 attached to the Kobayashi Force commenced a counterattack towards Marikina on the 6th Division salient, however this was stopped preventing the Japanese to reach their objective.

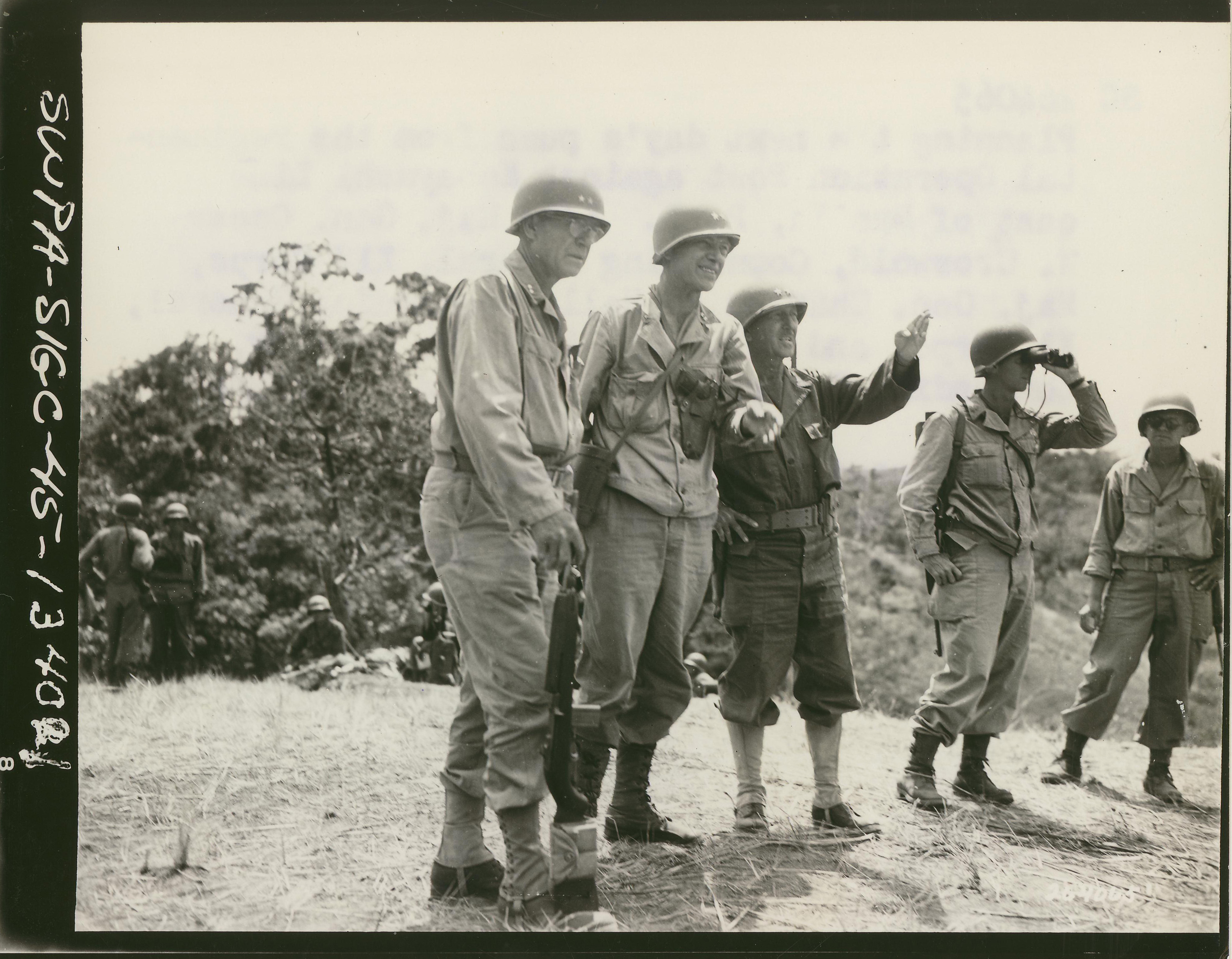
Major General Edwin D. Patrick (center), Major General Oscar Griswold (left) and Major General Charles P. Hall (right, pointing) on March 13, 1945.

On March 14 the 6th Division lost their commanding general, Edwin D. Patrick, who was killed by a Japanese straggler hiding in one of the caves. Gen. Patrick was one of three US Army division commanders who was killed in combat during World War II. Gen. Charles Hurdis took over command of the 6th Division at this point.

On March 17, another ferocious counterattack was launched by the Kobayashi Force on Mount Baytangan. Forcing the Americans to withdraw once more on March 20.

=== Seesaw Battle ===
On March 15, the XIV Corps was reassigned to the south, while the XI Corps under Gen. Charles P. Hall took over the assignment to face the Shimbu Group. On the southern end of the Shimbu Line, the 43rd Infantry Division went on a southern sweep on a two-pronged attack towards Tanay, Pililla, swinging north along the Morong River valley. The 43rd Division's mechanized forces eliminated Japanese strong points along the way, and with the capture of Mount Yabang as well as Mount Caymayuman northeast of Antipolo, it was practically able to eliminate the Noguchi Force, and close the southern escape routes and box in the Shimbu Group.

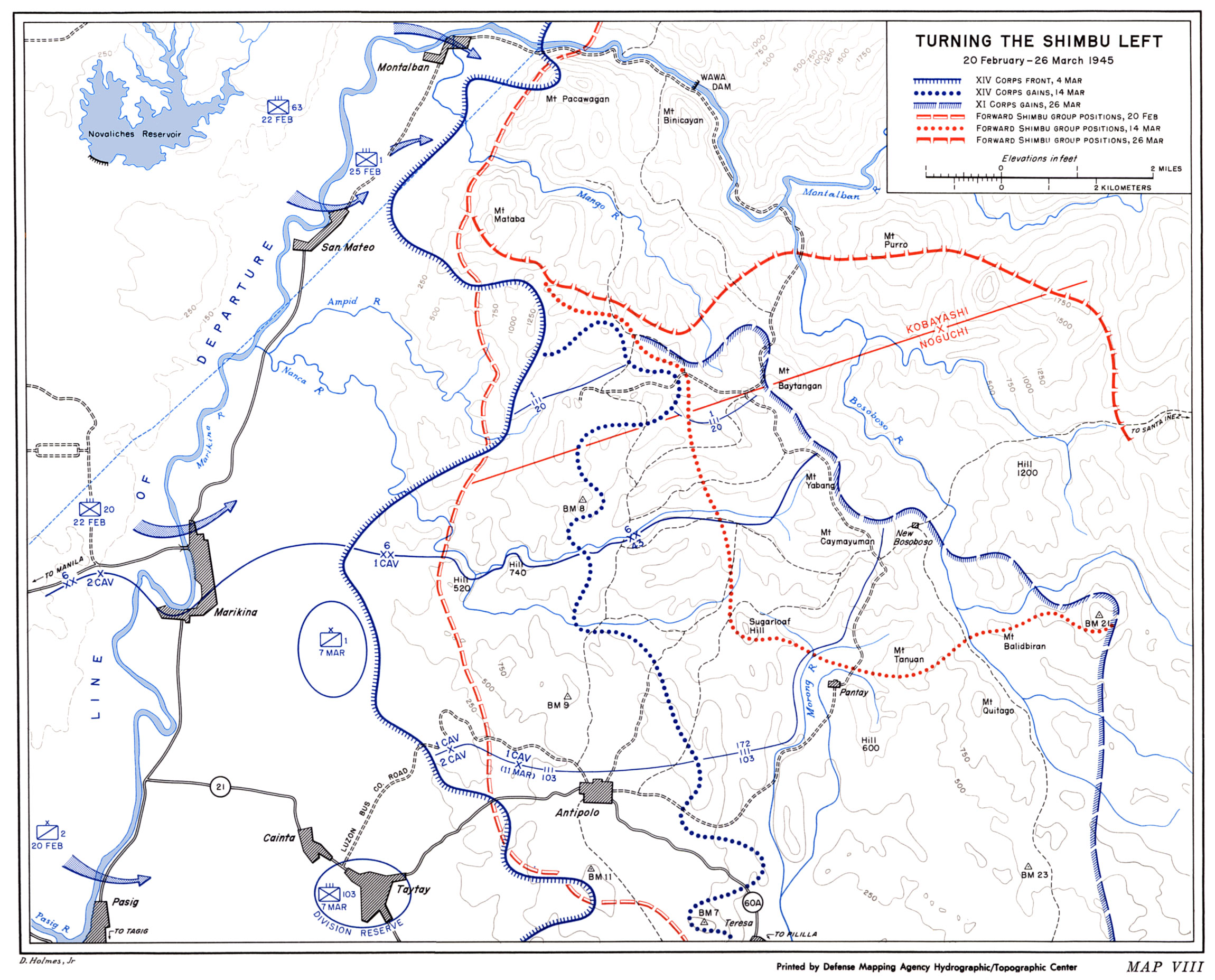
Sixth Army advances towards east of Manila.

The 6th Division and the 1st Cavalry meanwhile on March 26 finally secured Mount Baytangan in San Mateo through a concerted effort. This has allowed the XI Corps to finally have a commanding view of the Woodpecker Ridge. Albeit, the 6th Infantry Division was exhausted and suffered casualties to bring it to understrength. This was the similar case with the 1st Cavalry, whose effective strength was graded “fair.” By April 3, the 6th Division was augmented by the 63rd Infantry Division.

On the north at Ipo Dam, Gen. Hall has kept the 112th Cavalry on hold to keep the Kawashima Force in check to allow the main effort towards Wawa Dam to commence.

From April 6 to 9, the 6th Division had slow progress but were able to advance on the southwestern slopes of Mount Mataba, almost a month after their first attempt to capture the area. By April 17, the objective was secured, providing a staging point on Woodpecker Ridge. The 38th Division meanwhile descended from Mount Pacawagan and made an attempt on Mount Binacayan on April 7. In the south meanwhile the 43rd Division advanced through the Bosoboso Valley towards the north, closing the Kobayashi Force into a box.

By April 18, Gen. MacArthur cabled Gen. Krueger that water rationing has begun in Manila, and the southern part of the city beyond the Pasig River was no longer receiving any water. The capture of Wawa Dam has become a high priority. Unknown to MacArthur, upon completion of the Ipo Dam in 1938, Wawa Dam no longer supplied Manila with water but became a local irrigation dam. If Wawa Dam was to be connected it could only supply 15% of the needs of Manila. In the confusion and breakdown of communication, it took MacArthur 4 days to clarify that Ipo Dam was the primary objective. This forced Krueger to shift units around on April 22, with the 43rd Division to move north and replace the Gen. Cunningham's 112th Cavalry.

The confusion also drew Yokoyama to commit mistakes. Instead of throwing his forces to defend Ipo Dam, he instead concentrated his effort in defending Wawa Dam.

Meanwhile, the 1st Cavalry attempted another advance on Woodpecker Ridge on April 18, but was pushed back. For the second time in the month, Gen. Hall halted the 1st Cavalry's advance. This forced a rotation among units, with some elements of the 6th Division to be sent to Manila for garrison duty after a month of fighting in the Rizal area.

By April 30, after weeks of continuous combat and its forces being depleted, the task of advancing in capturing the Wawa Dam was passed on from the 6th Division to the 145th Infantry Regiment of the 37th Infantry Division from the west in the Marikina Valley, and the 38th Infantry Division from Mount Baytangan taking over from the 1st Cavalry.

=== May Campaign ===
By early May, the initial intelligence assessment was that the Shimbu Force with over 7,000 casualties has already withdrawn to the east of the Bosoboso River, and that the defense along the Wawa Gorge and the hills to the south were left for delaying action. Gen. Yokoyama however was able to concentrate his forces numbering to about 6,500, and was even planning for a counteroffensive. However, Gen. Yokoyama himself was not aware of the XI Corps plans, and whatever counterattack planned was checked in place by American artillery.

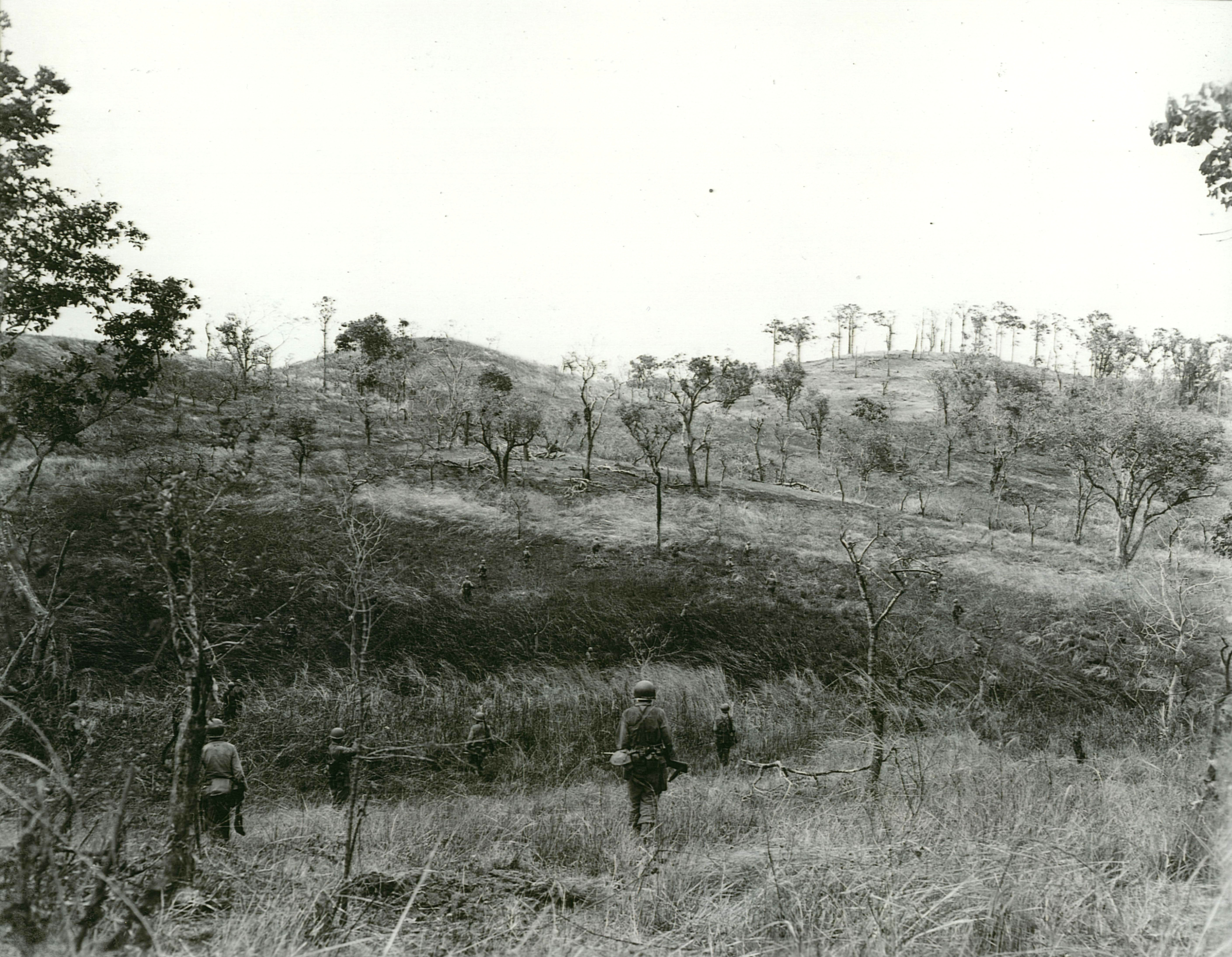
Infantrymen of 6th Infantry Division, advance up the side Mount Mataba on the Kobayashi Line.

On May 4, the 37th Division began its assault on Mount Pacawagan, while the 38th Division pushed towards Woodpecker Ridge. This in effect was hitting Gen. Yokoyama's center. By May 9, the 37th Division was able to move forward and secure Mount Binacayan, which loomed on the southern side of the Wawa Gorge. For the next two weeks, the efforts of the 38th Division to advance was slowed down due to supply problems.

On May 12, another major Japanese counterattack was launched. From Mount Purro, Kobayashi Forces stormed towards Mount Baytangan, and from south of Wawa an attempt was made to attack Montalban. Noguchi Forces also launched an attack from further south towards Antipolo. Yokoyama seeing that the American effort was towards Wawa Dam ordered Kawashima to move units south to support the center of the effort. Kawashima reluctantly obeyed, and ordered his center unit 358th Independent Infantry Battalion to head south to support Kobayashi in Wawa Dam. Just as he did this, troops of the 43rd Division pushed for Ipo Dam. Kobayashi recalled the 358th IB but this was too late. His forces were decimated by intense artillery fire, as well as the largest napalm bombing during the entirety of the Pacific War from an 81-aircraft formation of the Marine Aircraft Groups 24 and 32. On May 17 Kobayashi lost Ipo Dam and was forced to retreat further east.

By May 19, engineering units have bulldozed roads towards Woodpecker Ridge, finally providing 38th Division with the much needed fire support from medium tanks and flamethrower tanks, forcing a collapse of the Japanese defenses on May 21. The ridge was finally secured on May 25.

Meanwhile, the 37th Division crossed the Marikina River on the north bank and secured the northern twin summit of Mount Binacayan, Mount Pamitinan on May 21, and this effort progressed towards the northeast on Mount Hapanong-Banoy.

With the collapse of his north and south defensive lines, Gen. Yokoyama ordered the Kobayashi Force to a general retreat on May 22 most of his units ending in the Daraitan area of Tanay, Rizal. While Noguchi remnants ended up in the Siniloan hills in Laguna. By May 31, Gen. Chase reported that the Wawa Dam was completely secured, and the Kobayashi Force was practically eliminated.
