= Marking Guerrillas =

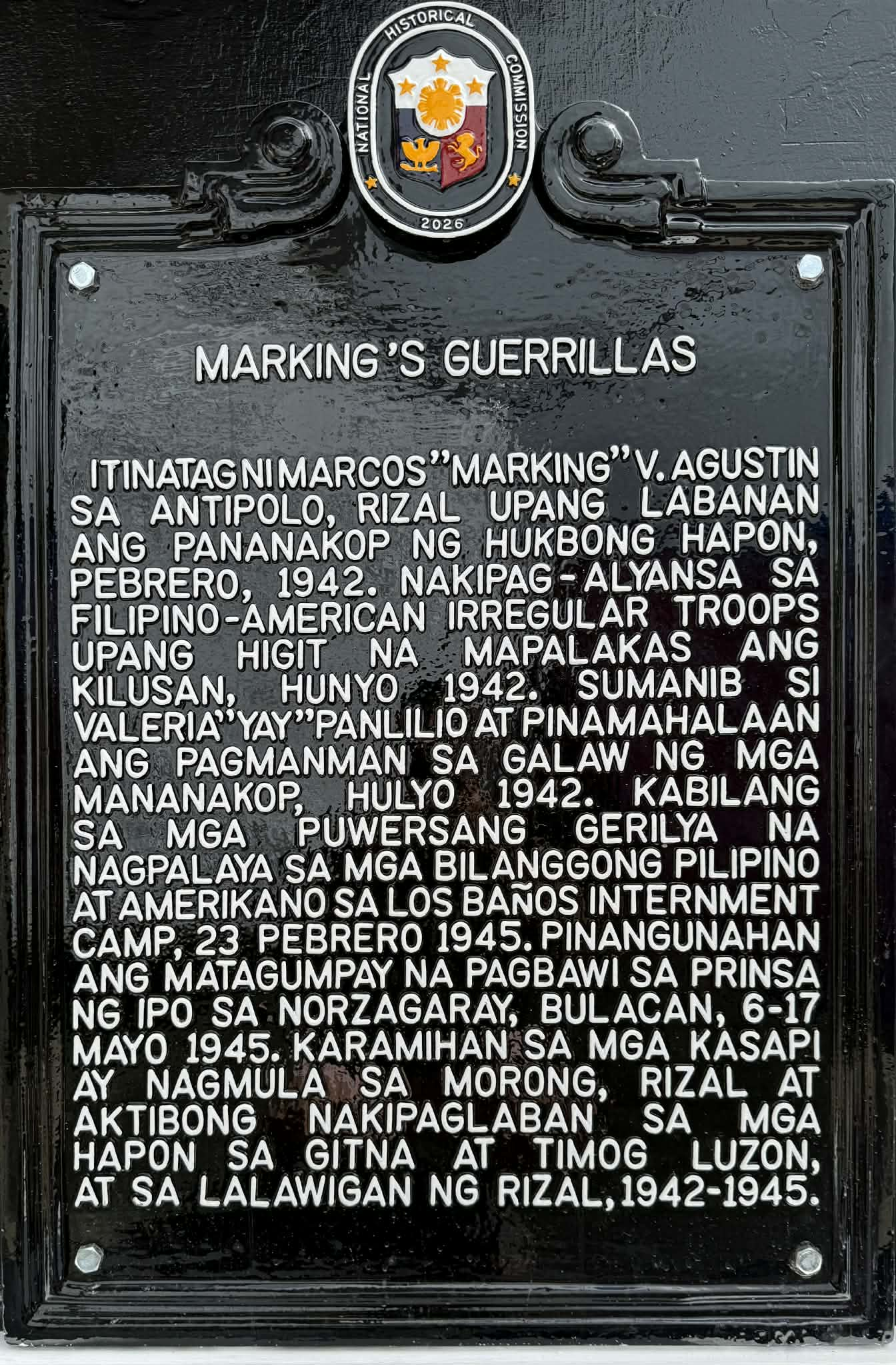
- Historical marker installed in Morong, Rizal, in 2025
- Active: 1942–1945
- Country: Philippines
- Allegiance: (Philippines) Philippine Commonwealth; United States
- Branch: Philippine Army
- Role: Resistance movement
- Engagements: World War II: Japanese occupation of the Philippines; Philippines Campaign; Battle of Manila; Battle of Wawa Dam; Battle of the Ipo Dam

Commanders
- Notable commanders: Yay Panlilio

The Marking Guerrillas were a Filipino guerrilla army that took part in the anti-Japanese resistance during the Japanese occupation of the Philippines in World War II. Headed by Colonel Marcos V. "Marking" Agustin and Valeria "Yay" Panlilio, the army is most well known for carrying out the capture of former Philippine president Emilio Aguinaldo during his collaboration with Japan, as well as the unit's role in the battle to capture the Ipo Dam from the Japanese.

== History ==
=== Formation under FAIT ===
The force was first organized in early 1942 by Colonel Marcos Villa "Marking" Agustin of the Philippine Scouts. In July of that year, Agustin was joined by journalist and intelligence agent Valeria "Yay" Panlilio, beginning a close relationship between the two. The Marking Guerrillas initially consisted of 150 men, and was part of a larger guerilla army known as the Fil-American Irregular Troops (FAIT), which was organized under U.S. Army Lieutenant Colonel Hugh Straughn. In contrast to other Filipino guerrilla units on Luzon, such as the Hunters ROTC and the USAFIP-NL, the Marking Guerrillas consisted primarily of older soldiers and civilians from the lower classes of Filipino society. Agustin claimed that his force consisted of 200,000 men and women; a recognition program by the U.S. Army commissioned after the war determined Marking's Guerrillas to have consisted of roughly 12,200 members by 1945. Between August 1942 and April 1943, the Marking Guerrillas were involved in a series of skirmishes with Japanese patrols on a 4 mi (6.4 km) by 2 mi (3.2 km) peninsula on the banks of Laguna de Bay, the largest lake in the Philippines.

=== Independent resistance and rivalry with Hunters ROTC ===
Following Straughn's capture and subsequent execution by the Japanese in August 1943, the Marking Guerrillas became an independent force, operating primarily in the Sierra Madre mountains of Luzon 50 km (31 miles) southeast of Manila. During this time, the guerrillas printed their own banknotes to fund the anti-Japanese resistance and be used as currency for local Filipino communities that they had freed from Japanese control.

A rivalry existed between the Marking Guerrillas and the Hunters ROTC, and while as they competed for support in Rizal and stole arms from each other as a result of weapons shortages. The two groups engaged in violent clashes with one another, one notable instance being in March 1944 when several Marking units attacked Hunters commander Terry Adevoso's headquarters at Mayamot, an attack which was ultimately repelled. Armed conflict between the two continued until August 1944, when U.S. officer and guerrilla commander Bernard Anderson intervened to end the feud.

The Marking Guerrillas co-operated with the ethnic Chinese Wha-Chi guerrilla unit in the capture of Santa Cruz, Laguna, from the Japanese on January 26, 1945.

=== Capture of Aguinaldo and Ipo Dam Battle ===
Units of the Marking Guerrillas participated in the Battle of Manila, where they were responsible for the capture of Japanese collaborator and former Philippine president Emilio Aguinaldo, whose home they raided on February 8, 1945. According to Aguinaldo, the guerrillas stole and destroyed many of his belongings during the raid, including jewelry, articles of clothing, documents, and tens of thousands worth of pesos and yen, and had also assaulted his niece.

During the later phases of the Second Philippines campaign, the Marking Guerrillas assisted the U.S. 43rd Infantry Division commanded by General Leonard Wing. This division, and the Marking Guerrillas by extension, were involved in the capture of the Ipo Dam, Manila's primary water source, from the Japanese, with guerrillas attacking Japanese forces from the western sector of the dam on May 6, 1945. Two guerrilla regiments under the command of Brigadier General Alexander N. Stark gathered in Angat, where they captured several strategic positions from the Japanese. On May 17 they crossed the Angat River and raised the American flag over the Ipo Dam's powerhouse, marking the Ipo Dam campaign a success. The guerrillas had lost 40 men during the raid. The Battle of the Ipo Dam is perhaps the event the Marking Guerrillas are best known for, with American military historian Robert Smith stating that the guerrillas deserved "the lion's share of the credit for the capture of the Ipo Dam."

The Marking Guerrillas ceased operations and disbanded shortly after their victory at the Ipo Dam, largely due to the departure of Yay Panlilio to the United States in early April of 1945. Panlilio later wrote of the experiences of her and her husband, Agustin (whom she married after the war) in her 1949 autobiography The Crucible.
