= Philippine resistance against Japan =

Organized guerilla group in World War II

- Part of the Pacific Theater of World War II
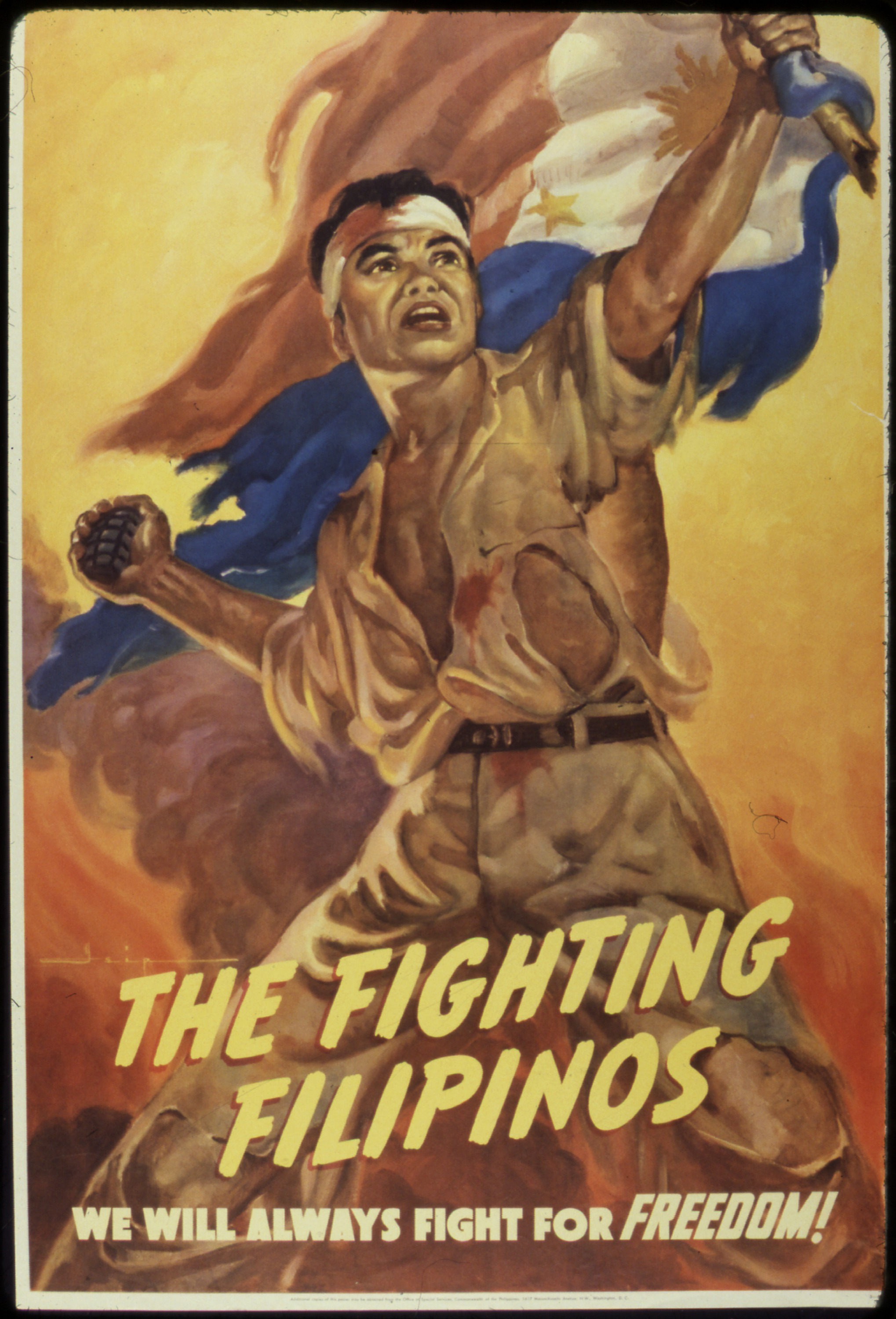
- Propaganda poster depicting the Philippine resistance movement
Date	December 8, 1941 – September 2, 1945 (3 years, 8 months, 3 weeks and 4 days)
Location	Philippines
Result	Allied victory
Territorial changes	Allied forces successfully liberated the Philippines

Belligerents
Empire of Japan: Philippine Executive Commission (until 1943); Second Philippine Republic (from 1943)	United States: (Commonwealth of the Philippines) Philippine Commonwealth; Philippine Communist Party: Hukbalahap (Note: Also attacked non-Huk guerrillas); Wha-Chi Moro people (Note: Also attacked American & Christian Filipino guerrillas)

Commanders and leaders
Masaharu Homma; Shizuichi Tanaka; Shigenori Kuroda; Tomoyuki Yamashita; Sosaku Suzuki; Shizuo Yokoyama; Jose P. Laurel; Jorge B. Vargas; Guillermo B. Francisco; Paulino Santos; Emilio Aguinaldo (POW); Benigno Ramos (MIA); Artemio Ricarte #	Wendell Fertig; Russell W. Volckmann; Edwin Ramsey; Marcos V. Agustin; Terry Adevoso; James M. Cushing; Robert Lapham; Ruperto Kangleon; Macario Peralta Jr.; Alejandro Suarez; Xu Jingcheng; Luis Taruc; Casto Alejandrino; Juan Feleo; Gumbay Piang; Salipada Pendatun

Units involved
14th Area Army: 35th Army; 41st Army; Kempeitai; Philippine Constabulary; Makapili	Recognized Guerrillas: 10th Military District; USAFIP-NL; ECLGA; Marking Guerrillas; Hunters ROTC; Cebu Area Command; Luzon Guerrilla Armed Forces; Leyte Area Command; 6th Military District; and others... Hukbalahap Moro-Bolo Battalion; Maranao Militia and others...

Strength
Unknown Japanese; 30,000 Constabulary; 6,000 Makapili	30,000 guerrillas in ten sectors (spring 1944); ~260,000 formally recognized members of the pro-US resistance following the war ~30,000 Hukbalahap fighters ~30,000 Moro Juramentados

Casualties and losses
8,000–10,000 dead (before the Allied invasion in October 1944) Potentially as high as 13,500 - 67,463 Casualties	8,000 dead (1942–1945)
- Around 530,000 to 1,000,000 Filipinos died during the Japanese occupation.

During the Japanese occupation of the islands in World War II, there was an extensive Philippine resistance movement (Filipino: Kilusan ng Paglaban sa Pilipinas), which opposed the Japanese and their collaborators with active underground and guerrilla activity that increased over the years. Fighting the guerrillas – apart from the Japanese regular forces – were a Japanese-formed Bureau of Constabulary (later taking the name of the old Philippine Constabulary during the Second Republic), the Kempeitai (the Japanese military police), and the Makapili (Filipinos fighting for the Japanese). Postwar studies estimate that around 260,000 people contributed to the anti-Japanese underground resistance in one way or another. Such was their effectiveness that by the end of World War II, Japan controlled only twelve of the forty-eight provinces.

Select units of the resistance would go on to be reorganized and equipped as units of the Philippine Army and Constabulary. The United States Government officially granted payments and benefits to various ethnicities who have fought with the Allies by the war's end. However, only the Filipinos were excluded from such benefits, and since then these veterans have made efforts in finally being acknowledged by the United States. Some 277 separate guerrilla units, with 260,715 individuals officially recognized as having participated in the resistance movement.

== Background ==
The attack on Pearl Harbor (called Hawaii Operation or Operation AI by the Japanese Imperial General Headquarters) was a surprise military strike conducted by the Imperial Japanese Navy against the United States naval base at Pearl Harbor, Hawaii, on the morning of December 7, 1941 (December 8 in Japan and the Philippines). The attack was intended as a preventive action in order to keep the U.S. Pacific Fleet from interfering with military actions Japan was planning in Southeast Asia against the overseas territories of the United States, the United Kingdom, and the Netherlands.

Immediately after the attack on Pearl Harbor, the Japanese operations to invade the Commonwealth of the Philippines began. Twenty-five twin engine planes bombed Tuguegarao and Baguio in the first preemptive strike in Luzon. The Japanese forces then quickly conducted a landing at Batan Island, and by December 17, General Masaharu Homma gave his estimate that the main component of the United States Air Force in the archipelago was destroyed. By January 2, Manila was under Japanese control and by January 9, Homma had cornered the remaining forces in Bataan. By April 9, the remaining of the combined American-Filipino force was forced to retire from Bataan to Corregidor. Meanwhile, Japanese invasions of Cebu (April 19) and Panay (April 20) were successful. By May 7, after the last of the Japanese attacks on Corregidor, General Jonathan M. Wainwright announced through a radio broadcast in Manila the surrender of the Philippines. Following Wainwright was General William F. Sharp, who surrendered Visayas and Mindanao on May 10.

Afterwards came the Bataan Death March, which was the forcible transfer, by the Imperial Japanese Army, of 60,000 Filipino and 15,000 American prisoners of war after the three-month Battle of Bataan in the Philippines during World War II. The death toll of the march is difficult to assess as thousands of captives were able to escape from their guards (although many were killed during their escapes), and it is not known how many died in the fighting that was taking place concurrently. All told, approximately 2,500–10,000 Filipino and 300–650 American prisoners of war died before they could reach Camp O'Donnell.

== Resistance in Luzon ==
=== USAFFE and American sponsored guerrillas ===
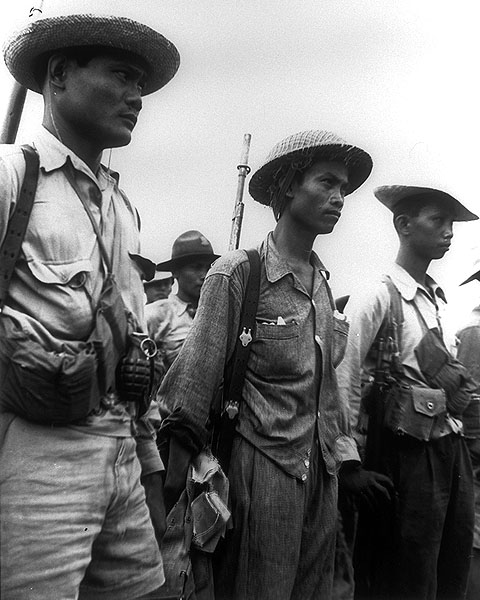
Captain Pajota's guerrillas at Cabanatuan

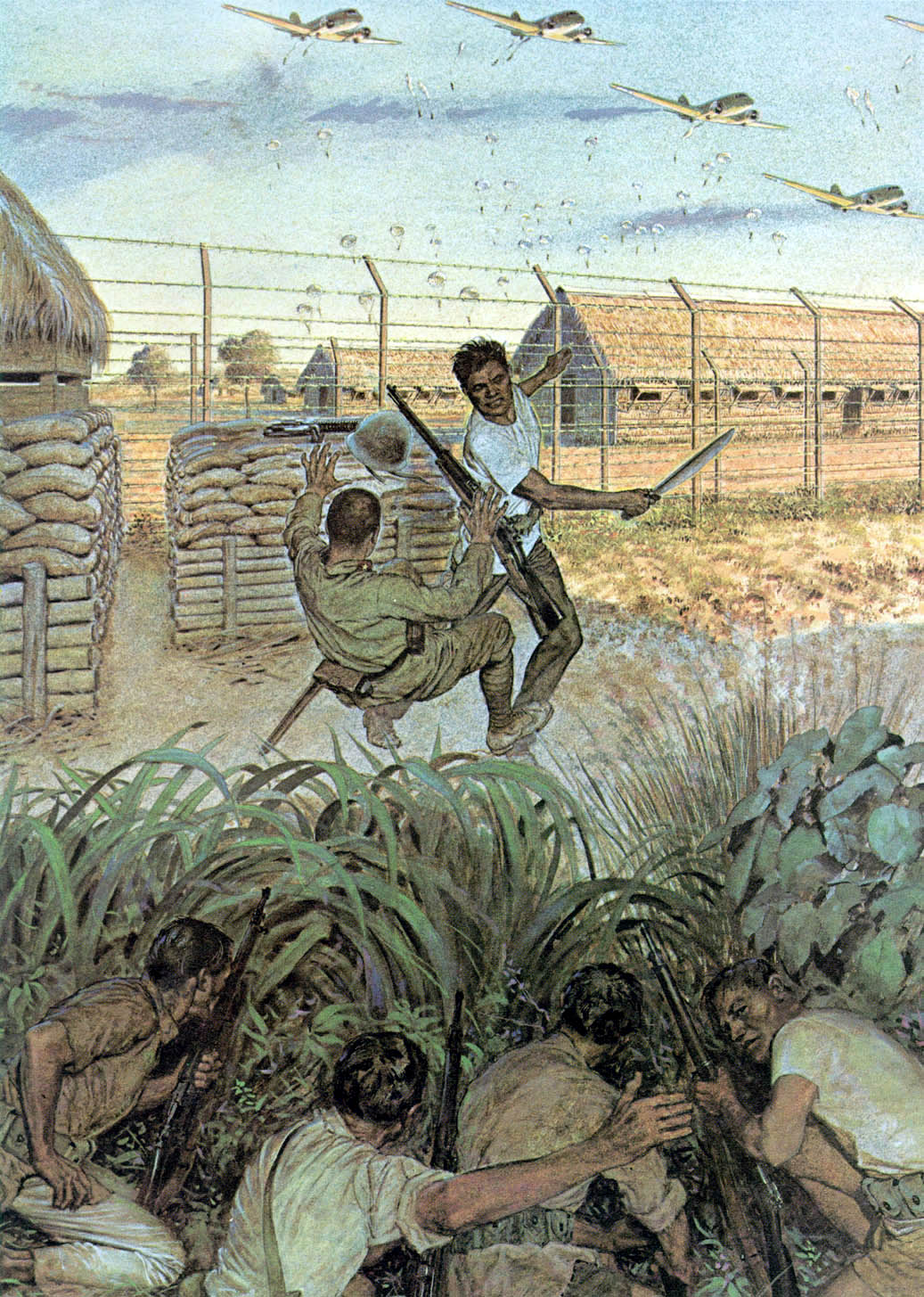
Painting of a guerrilla armed with a bolo knife disarming a Japanese sentry of his rifle during the raid at Los Baños

After Bataan and Corregidor, many who escaped the Japanese reorganized in the mountains as guerrillas still loyal to the U.S. Army Forces Far East (USAFFE). One example would be the unit of Ramon Magsaysay in Zambales, which first served as a supply and intelligence unit. After the surrender in May 1942, Magsaysay and his unit formed a guerrilla force which grew to a 10,000-man force by the end of the war. Another was the Hunters ROTC which operated in the Southern Luzon area, mainly near Manila. It was created upon dissolution of the Philippine Military Academy in the beginning days of the war. Cadet Terry Adivoso refused to simply go home as cadets were ordered to do, and began recruiting fighters willing to undertake guerrilla action against the Japanese. This force would later be instrumental, providing intelligence to the liberating forces led by General Douglas MacArthur, and took an active role in numerous battles, such as the Raid at Los Baños. When war broke out in the Philippines, some 300 Philippine Military Academy and ROTC cadets, unable to join the USAFFE units because of their youth, banded together in a common desire to contribute to the war effort throughout the Bataan campaign. The Hunters originally conducted operations with another guerrilla group known as the Marking Guerrillas, with whom they went about liquidating Japanese spies. Led by Miguel Ver, a PMA cadet, the Hunters raided the enemy-occupied Union College in Manila and seized 130 Enfield rifles.

Also, before being proven false in 1985 by the United States Military, Philippine President Ferdinand Marcos claimed that he had commanded a 9,000-strong guerrilla force known as the Maharlika Unit. Marcos also used maharlika as his personal pseudonym; depicting himself as a bemedalled anti-Japanese Filipino guerrilla fighter during World War II. Marcos told exaggerated tales and exploits of himself fighting the Japanese in his self-published autobiography Marcos of the Philippines which was proven to be fiction. His father, Mariano Marcos, did however collaborate with the Japanese and was executed by Filipino guerrillas in April 1945 under the command of Colonel George Barnett, and Ferdinand himself was accused of being a collaborator as well.

In July 1942, South West Pacific Area (SWPA) became aware of the resistance movements forming in occupied Philippines through attempted radio communications to Allies outside of the Philippines; by late 1942, couriers had made it to Australia confirming the existence of the resistance. By December 1942, SWPA sent Captain Jesús A. Villamor to the Philippines to make contact with guerrilla organizations, eventually developing extensive intelligence networks including contacts within the Second Republic Government. (Note: Villamor departed the Philippines in October 1943, due to illness.) A few months later SWPA sent Lieutenant Commander Chick Parsons, who returned to the Philippines in early 1943, vetting guerrilla leaders and established communications and supply for them with SWPA. Through the Allied Intelligence Bureau's Philippine Regional Section, SWPA sent operatives and equipment into the Philippines to supply and assist guerrilla organizations, often by submarine. The large cruiser submarines USS Narwhal and USS Nautilus, with a high capacity for personnel and supplies, proved especially useful in supporting the guerrillas. Beginning in mid-1943, the assistance to the guerrillas in the Philippines became more organized, with the formation of the 5217th Reconnaissance Battalion, which was largely composed of volunteer Filipino Americans from the 1st and 2nd Filipino Infantry Regiments, which were established and organized in California.

In Nueva Ecija, guerrillas led by Juan Pajota and Eduardo Joson protected the U.S. Army Rangers and Alamo Scouts who were conducting a rescue mission of Allied POWs from a counterattack by Japanese reinforcements. Pajota and the Filipino guerrillas received Bronze Stars for their role in the raid. Among the guerrilla units, the Blue Eagles were a specialized unit established for landmine and sniper detection, as well as in hunting Japanese spies who had blended in with the civilian population.

In Bamban, Tarlac, Aeta guerillas formed Aeta Squadron 30 under U.S. Captain Alfred Bruce as part of the Philippine resistance in Central Luzon.

Nonetheless, Japanese crackdowns on these guerrillas in Luzon were widespread and brutal. The Imperial Japanese Army, Kenpeitai and Filipino collaborators hunted down resistance fighters and anyone associated with them. One example happened to resistance leader Wenceslao Vinzons, leader of the successful guerrilla movement in Bicol. After being betrayed to the Japanese by a Japanese collaborator, Vinzons was tortured to give up information on his resistance movement. Vinzons however refused to cooperate, and he and his family, consisting of his father Gabino, his wife Liwayway, sister Milagros and children Aurora and Alexander, were bayoneted to death.

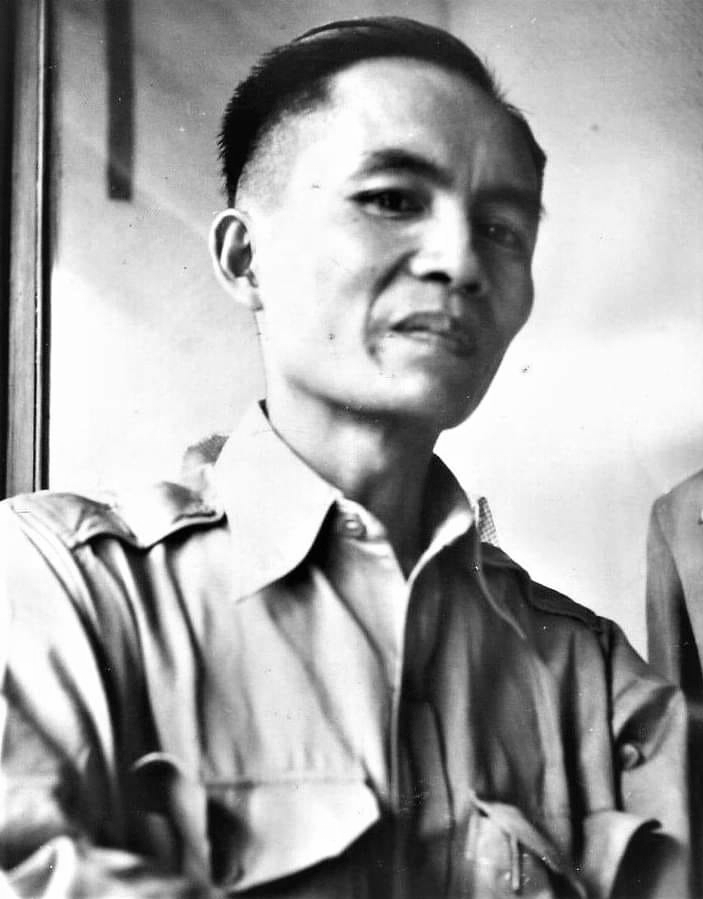
Luis Taruc, Filipino Hukbalahap guerrilla leader

=== Hukbalahap resistance ===
As originally constituted in March 1942, the Hukbalahap was to be part of a broad united front resistance to the Japanese occupation of the Philippines. This original intent is reflected in its name: "Hukbong Bayan Laban sa mga Hapon", which was "People's Army Against the Japanese" when translated into English. The adopted slogan was "Anti-Japanese Above All". The Huk Military Committee was at the apex of Huk structure and was charged to direct the guerrilla campaign and to lead the revolution that would seize power after the war. Luis Taruc, a communist leader and peasant-organizer from a barrio in Pampanga, was elected as head of the committee and became the first Huk commander called "El Supremo". Casto Alejandrino became his second-in-command.

The Huks began their anti-Japanese campaign as five 100-man units. They obtained needed arms and ammunition from Philippine army stragglers, who were escapees from the Battle of Bataan and deserters from the Philippine Constabulary, in exchange of civilian clothes. The Huk recruitment campaign progressed more slowly than Taruc had expected, due to competition with U.S. Army Forces Far East (USAFFE) guerrilla units in enlisting new soldiers. The U.S. units already had recognition among the islands, had trained military leaders, and an organized command and logistical system. Despite being restrained by the American sponsored guerrilla units, the Huks nevertheless took to the battlefield with only 500 men and much fewer weapons. Several setbacks at the hands of the Japanese and with less than enthusiastic support from USAFFE units did not hinder the Huks growth in size and efficiency throughout the war, developing into a well-trained, highly organized force with some 15,000 armed fighters by war's end. Though the Huks' primary enemy was the Japanese, they also occasionally clashed with non-Huk guerrillas. One estimate alleges that the Huks killed 20,000 non-Japanese collaborators during the occupation.

=== Ethnic Chinese resistance ===
Unique to other guerrillas in the Philippines were the Wha-Chi; a resistance unit composed of Filipino-Chinese and Chinese immigrants. They were established from the Chinese General Labour Union of the Philippines and the Philippine branch of the Chinese Communist Party and reached a strength of 700 men. The movement served under the Huks until around 1943, when they started operating independently. They were also aided by the American guerrilla forces.

== Resistance in Visayas ==
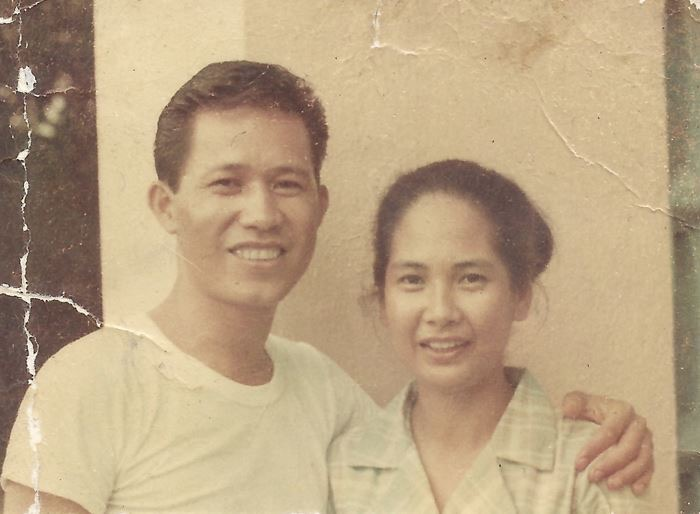
Captain Nieves Fernandez, a Filipina school teacher who led the resistance in Tacloban, Leyte, Philippines with her husband in a photograph from 1944

Various guerrilla groups also sprang out throughout the central islands of Visayas. Like those in Luzon, many of these Filipino guerrillas were trained by the Americans to fight in case the Japanese set their sights on the Visayas. These soldiers continued to fight even as the Americans surrendered the islands to the Japanese.

One significant achievement for the resistance in Visayas was the capture of the "Koga Papers" by Cebuano guerrillas led by Lt. Col. James M. Cushing on April 1, 1944. Named after Admiral Mineichi Koga, these papers contained vital battle plans and defensive strategies of the Japanese Navy (code-named the "Z Plan"), information on the overall strength of the Japanese fleet and naval air units, and most importantly the fact that the Japanese had already deduced MacArthur's initial plans to invade the Philippines through Mindanao. These papers came into Filipino possession when Koga's seaplane, en route to Davao, crashed on the Cebu coast at San Fernando in the early hours of April 1, killing him and others. After Koga's body (and many surviving Japanese) washed ashore, the guerrillas captured 12 high-ranking officers, including Vice Admiral Shigeru Fukodome, Chief of Staff of the Combined Fleet. On April 3, Cebuano fishermen found the papers inside a floating briefcase, then handed them over to the guerrillas, whereupon the Japanese ruthlessly hunted down both the documents and their captured officers, burning villages and detaining civilians in the process. They ultimately forced the guerrillas to release their captives in order to stop the aggression, but Cushing managed to summon a submarine which transported the documents to Allied headquarters in Australia. The contents of the papers were a factor in MacArthur's decision to move his planned invasion site from Mindanao to Leyte, and also aided the Allies in the Battle of the Philippine Sea.

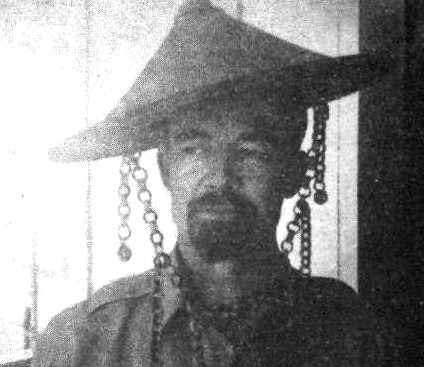
American Colonel Wendell Fertig, U.S. Army Corps of Engineers and commander of the 10th Military District, Island of Mindanao, Philippines and the resistance forces with his well-known red goatee, which he wore during the war, photo taken by unknown U.S. military photographer, circa 1942-1945

Waray guerrillas under a former school teacher named Nieves Fernandez fought the Japanese in Tacloban. Nieves extensively trained her men in combat skills and making of improvised weaponry, as well as leading her men in the front. With only 110 men, Nieves managed to take out over 200 Japanese soldiers during the occupation. The Imperial Japanese Army posted a 10,000 pesos reward on her head in the hopes of capturing her but to no avail. The main commander of the resistance movement in the Island of Leyte was Ruperto Kangleon, a former Filipino soldier turned resistance fighter and leader. After the fall of the country, he successfully escaped capture by the Japanese and established a united guerrilla front in Leyte. He and his men, the Black Army, were successful in pushing the Japanese from the mainland province and further into the coastlands of Southern Leyte. Kangleon's guerrillas provided intelligence for the American guerrilla leaders such as Wendell Fertig, and assisted in the subsequent Leyte Landing and the Battle of Leyte soon after. The guerrillas in Leyte were also instrumental not only in the opposition against Japanese rule, but also in the safety and aid of the civilians living in the island. The book The Hidden Battle of Leyte: The Picture Diary of a Girl taken by the Japanese Military by Remedios Felias, a former comfort woman, revealed how the Filipino guerrillas saved the lives of many young girls raped or at risk of rape by the Japanese. In her vivid account of the Battle of Burauen, she recounts how the guerrillas managed to wipe out entire Japanese platoons in the various villages in the municipality, eventually saving the lives of many.

Besides their guerrilla activities, these groups also participated in many pivotal battles during the liberation of the islands. In Cebu, guerrillas and irregulars under Lieutenant James M. Cushing and Basilio J. Valdes aided in the Battle for Cebu City. They also captured Maj. Gen. Takeo Manjom and his 2,000 soldiers and munitions. Panay guerrillas under Col. Macario Peralta helped in the seizing of the Tiring Landing Field and Mandurriao district airfield during the Battle of the Visayas. Major Ingeniero commanded the guerrilla forces in Bohol, in which they were credited in the liberation of the island from Japanese outposts at a cost of only seven men.

Filipino guerrillas under the command of Captain Jesus Olmedo come out to meet Major General A.V. Arnold at U.S. Army 7th Division headquarters for a conference in 1944.

== Moro resistance in Mindanao ==
While Moro rebels were still unsuccessfully at war with the United States, the Japanese invasion became the new perceived threat to their religion and culture. Some of those who opposed the occupation and fought for Moro nationalism, were Sultan Jainal Abirin II of Sulu, the Sulu Sultanate of the Tausug, and the Maranao Moros living around Lake Lanao and ruled by the Confederation of sultanates in Lanao led by Salipada Pendatun. Another anti-Japanese Moro unit, the Moro-Bolo Battalion led by Datu Gumbay Piang, consisted of about 20,000 fighting men made up of both Muslims and Christians. As their name suggests, these fighters were known visibly by their large bolos and kris. The Japanese Major Hiramatsu, a propaganda officer, tried convincing Datu Busran Kalaw of Maranao to join their side as "brother Orientals". Kalaw sent a response which goaded Major Hiramatsu into sending a force of Japanese soldiers to attack him, whom Kalaw butchered completely with no survivors. The juramentados brigands, who were veterans in fighting the Filipinos, Spanish and the Americans, now focused their assaults on the Japanese, using their traditional hit and run as well as suicide charges. The Japanese were anxious of being attacked by the resistance, and they fought back by murdering innocent civilians and destroying properties.

During these times, the Moros had no allegiance with the Filipinos and the Americans, and they were largely unwelcoming of their assistance. In many cases, they would even indiscriminately attack them as well, especially following the fall of Corregidor, and establishment of a truce with the Moros by Wendell Fertig in mid 1943. The Moros also performed various cruelties during the war, such as thoughtlessly assaulting Japanese immigrants already living in Mindanao before the war. The commander Datu Busran Kalaw was known for boasting that he "fought both the Americans, Filipinos and the Japanese", which took the lives of both American and Filipino agents and the Japanese occupiers. Nonetheless, the Americans respected the success of the Moros during the war. American POW Herbert Zincke recalled in his secret diary that the Japanese guarding him and other prisoners were scared of the Moro warriors and tried to keep as far away from them as possible to avoid getting attacked. The American Captain Edward Kraus recommended Moro fighters for a suggested plan to capture an airbase in Lake Lanao before eventually driving the Japanese occupiers out of the Philippines. The Moro Datu Pino sliced the ears off Japanese and cashed them in with the American guerrilla leader Colonel Fertig at the exchange rate of a pair of ears for one bullet and 20 centavos.

50 Moros were vivisected by a Japanese unit, the 33rd coast guard squad in Zamboanga in Mindanao in which Akira Makino served. Moro guerrillas armed with spears were the main enemies of the Japanese in the area.

Both Americans and Japanese committed massacres against Moro Maranaos. 400 Maranaos were massacred by US artillery bombardment by Captain John S. Pershing in 1903. Japan invaded Mindanao in 1942 and issued orders for Maranao to surrender bladed implements so that every 2 households would share one blade and give up all their guns, killing anyone who didn't obey the order. The Japanese executions of Maranos who kept their firearms led to Maranao revenge attacks against the Japanese. Manalao Mindalano was one of the Maranao insurgents fighting the Japanese. The Japanese at Dansalan massacred and bayoneted 24 Maranao men and women civilians in Watu village while searching for Manalao Mindalano even though they had no relations to his guerrilla group. The Maranaos then destroyed a Japanese convoy by shooting at their tires and drivers causing them to crash off bridges and roads. Maranao houses were then burned by the Japanese. A Japanese infantry company was slaughtered by Maranao villages with bladed weapons in September 1942 in the battle of Tamparan. The battle started on the 1st day of Ramadan on 12 September when the Japanese, searching for a Maranao guerrilla leader in Tamapran sent 90 Japanese infantrymen there. The Japanese used mortars to fire on the Maranaos after they defied the Japanese patrol. Maranaos around and in Tamparan came with bladed weapons and rifles to attack the Japanese as they heard the mortar shells. Most of the Maranaos only had blades and charged the Japanese directly through their mortar and bullet fire while Maranos with rifles attacked the Japanese from the rear while crawling in the grass. The Japanese were pinned down from three directions and out of ammunition and tried to escape to boats on Lake Lanao but were stuck in the marsh. The Japanese were stuck in the mud by their boots while trying to use their bayonets as the Moros who went barefoot hacked at them. Japanese tried to surrender as they were defeated by the Maranao refused to accept surrender. Some Japanese soldiers under 1st Lieutenant Atsuo Takeuchi tried to escape to a boat on the pier but the forced labour on the boats already escaped into the lake and the Japanese were stuck. Takeuchi tried to surrender and threw away his sword but a Maranao hacked him to death and mocked him, saying "No surrender Tekeuchi!" as he recalled that Tekuchi boasted before that Japanese never surrendered. 85 Japanese were hacked to death on the lake near Tamparan. The Maranaos hacked and mutilated the Japanese corpses. The Japanese responded to the battle by bombarding Maranao villages including Tamparan from air and artillery for 25 days, massacring civilian children and women Maranaos. 80 Maranao civilian children, women and men were killed in a mosque by a Japanese bomb. Maranaos then blocked culverts, cut down trees and razed the road to block Japanese movement as the felled trees and blocked culverts would cause the rain to destroy what was left of the roads. At Ganassi a Japanese garrison was besieged by Maranao. At Lake Lanao the Maranao severed communications and contact between 3 Japanese garrisons in total by the conclusion of 1942. Before US guerrillas even started their insurgency against Japan, Lanao Plateau was liberated by Maranao from Japanese control. Moros in other places like Datu Udtug Matalam fought the Japanese in upper Cotabato Valley and Bukdnon. Japanese avoided Datu Udtug since 1942 because he constantly attacked their garrisons. Udtug Matalam's brother in law Salipada Pendatun fought the Japanese in Bukidnon, expelling them from Malaybalay, the provincial capital, Del Monte airfield and garrisons in Bukidnon in a period of six months in 1942-1943 and winning a battle at a POW camp.

97% of the Japanese soldiers occupying Jolo were slaughtered by Moro Muslim Tausug guerrillas according to Japanese soldier Fujioka Akiyoshi, who was one of the few who remained alive by the end of the war. Fujioka described the Moros as brutal and recalled how the Moros sliced the livers and gold teeth off Japanese soldiers and in one month slaughtered 1,000 Japanese after they came to the island. Fujioka and his fellow Japanese soldiers were overjoyed when they finally reached an American base to surrender to since they knew their only other fate was being butchered by Moro Muslims or starvation. Injured Japanese were slaughtered by Moros with their kris daggers as the Moros constantly attacked and charged and butchered Japanese soldiers. Fujioka Akiyoshi (藤岡 明義) wrote a published diary of his war experiences on Jolo called (Haisen no ki ~ gyokusai chi Horo tō no kiroku )(敗戦の記～玉砕地ホロ島の記録 or 敗残の記: 玉砕地ホロ島の記錄) and a private account "Uijin no ki" (初陣の記). His diary mentioned the majority of Japanese on Jolo were slaughtered, succumbing to malaria and to Moro attacks. Japanese corpses littered the ground, decaying, infested with maggots and smelling horrendous. Fukao and other Japanese survivors surrendered to the Americans to avoid being slaughtered by the Moro Muslims and after they were in American custody a group of Moros grasping their daggers saw them and wanted to slaughter them. One Moro mentioned how his 12-year-old son was eaten by Japanese soldiers at a mountain and he was slaughtering all Japanese soldiers from that area and Fujioka saw he was wearing the wristwatch of Japanese Sergeant Fukao.

Many Japanese and Okinawan settlers, who were loyal to the Japanese emperor, moved to Mindanao to assist American colonization on the island in the 1920s and they despised and looked down upon the Muslim Moros who they did not interact with. The Okinawan settlers married local Lumad women. The Japanese tortured and killed Lebanese and Syrians as well as raping Russian, Italians and Spanish women in the Bayview hotel of Manila.

Gum Incorporated company made a bubblegum card series for Allied fighters in World War II and one of the cards show Japanese invaders being slaughtered by Moros.

On 5 April 2019 MNLF member Abdul was interviewed by Elgin Glenn Salomon and said about the battle of Jolo in 1974 between the Philippines and MNLF. “They could not defeat the people of Sulu. See the Japanese, the Americans, and the Spaniards! They cannot defeat the province of Jolo. Until now, they could not defeat.... See, they (MNLF) have three guns... At the age of 12, they already have a gun. Will the soldiers continue to enter their territory? The heavy-duty soldiers would die at their (MNLF) hands.”

Japanese used machine guns to massacre Muslim Suluk children and women at a mosque in the aftermath of the Jesselton revolt.

The Japanese killed Suluk women and children in British north Borneo at a mosque. Bajau-Suluk participated in a violent revolt against the Japanese.

Wong Mu Sing was a Chinese resistance fighter in British Borneo during World War II. Wong Mu Sing was married to a Suluk Tausug Muslim woman, Halima bint Amat.

A Han Chinese man Wong Mu Sing who was a guerilla fighter during the war was married to a Moro Suluk Tausug Muslim woman, Halima Binte Amat and he was killed during the war for trying to rescue Allied POWs. His widow was given an award in October 1950 on his behalf. Another Suluk Tausug widow, Halima Bine Binting was married to a Tausug guerilla named Matsup bin Gangau and he was also killed by the Japanese for helping allied prisoners of war. The Japanese starved and abused Javanese Muslim labourers brought to north Borneo.

== Recognition ==
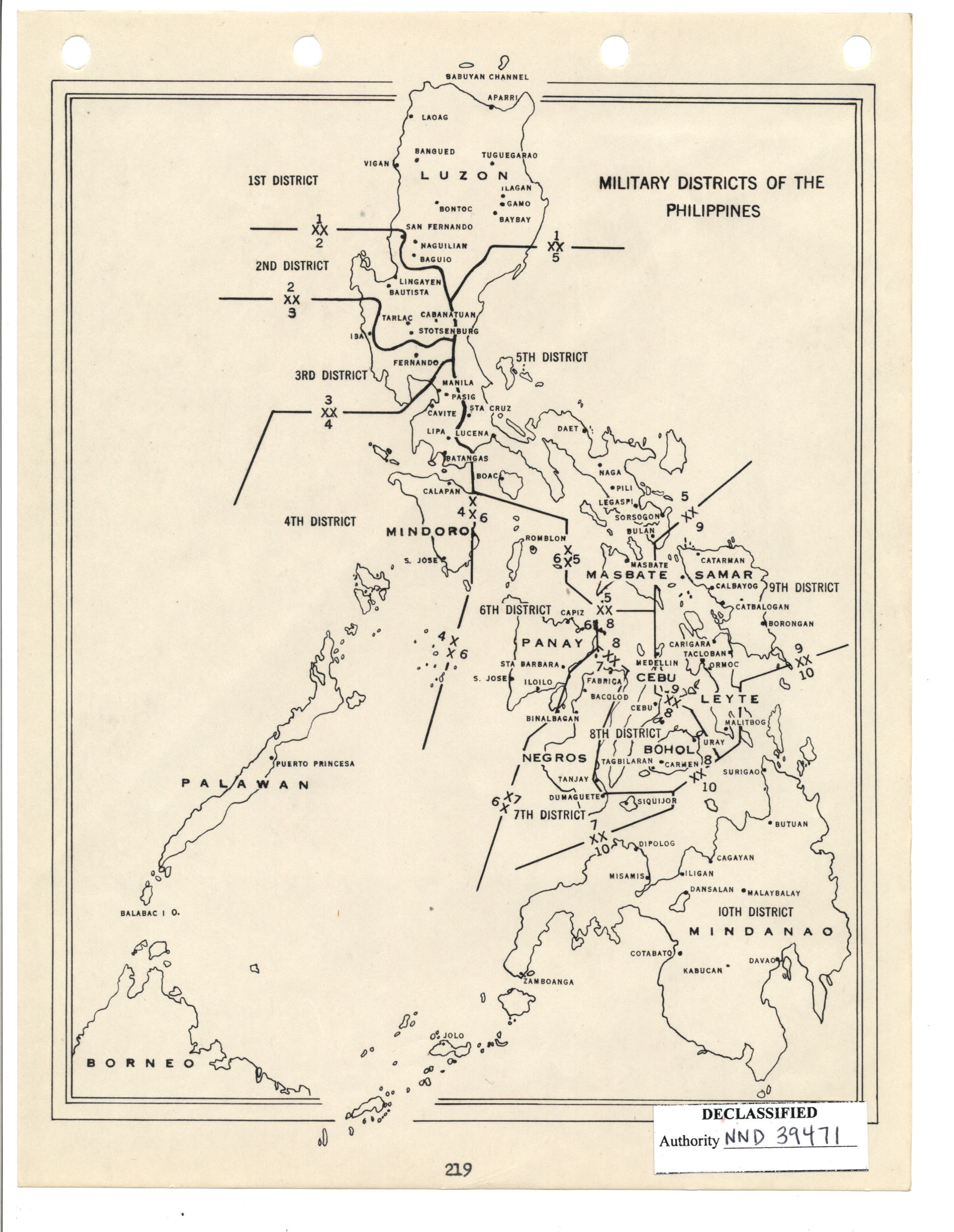
The 10 Military Districts recognized by the US Army.

"Give me ten thousand Filipinos and I shall conquer the world!"

— Gen. Douglas MacArthur during his liberation of the Philippines, highly impressed with the Filipinos who fought with him

The Filipino guerrillas were successful in their resistance against the Japanese occupation. Of the 48 provinces in the Philippines, only 12 were in firm control of the Japanese. Many provinces in Mindanao were already liberated by the Moros well before the Americans came, as well as major islands in the Visayas such as Cebu, Panay and Negros. During the occupation, many Filipino soldiers and guerrillas never lost hope of the United States. Their objective was to both continue the fight against the Japanese and prepare for the return of the Americans. They were instrumental in helping the United States liberate the rest of the islands from the Japanese.

After the war, the American and Philippines governments officially recognized some of the units and individuals who had fought against the Japanese, which led to benefits for the veterans, but not all claims were upheld. There were 277 recognized guerrilla units out of over 1,000 claimed, and 260,715 individuals were recognized from nearly 1.3 million claims. These benefits are only available to the guerrillas and veterans who have served for the Commonwealth, and don't include the brigand groups of the Huks and the Moros. Resistance leaders Wendell Fertig, Russell W. Volckmann and Donald Blackburn would incorporate what they learned fighting with the Filipino guerrillas in establishing what would become the U.S. Special Forces.

In 1944, only Filipino soldiers were denied from being given benefits by the GI Bill of Rights, which was supposed to give welfare to all those who have served in the United States Military irrespective of race, color or nationality. Over 66 countries were inducted into the bill but only the Philippines was left out, describing the Filipino soldiers as mere "Second Class Veterans". Then in 1946, the Rescission Act was enacted to mandate some aid to Filipino veterans, but only to those who had disabilities or serious injuries. The only benefit the United States could give at that time was the Immigrant Act, which made it easier for Filipinos who served in World War II to get American citizenship. It was not until 1996 that the veterans started seeking recognition from the United States. Representative Colleen Hanabusa submitted legislation to award Filipino Veterans with a Congressional Gold Medal, which became known as the Filipino Veterans of World War II Congressional Gold Medal Act. The Act was referred to the Committee on Financial Services and the Committee on House Administration. The Philippine government has also enacted laws concerning the benefits of Filipino guerrillas.

The World War II guerrilla movement in the Philippines has also garnered attention in Hollywood films such as Back to Bataan, Back Door to Hell, American Guerrilla in the Philippines, Cry of Battle and the more contemporary John Dahl film The Great Raid. Filipino and Japanese films have also paid homage to the valor of the Filipino guerrillas during the occupation, such as Yamashita: The Tiger's Treasure, In the Bosom of the Enemy, Aishite Imasu 1941: Mahal Kita and the critically acclaimed Japanese film Fires on the Plain. A Filipino TV series, Pulang Araw, tells the story of Filipinos under the Japanese occupation, including the guerilla movement. There have been various memorials and monuments erected to commemorate the actions of the Filipino guerrillas. Among such are the Filipino Heroes Memorial in Corregidor, the Luis Taruc Memorial in San Luis, Pampanga, the bronze statue of a Filipino guerrilla in Corregidor, Balantang National Shrine in Jaro, Iloilo City to commemorate the 6th Military District that liberated the provinces of Panay, Romblon, and Guimaras, and the NL Military Shrine and Park in La Union. The Libingan ng mga Bayani (translated to Cemetery of the Heroes), which contains many Filipino national heroes, erected a special monument to pay respect to the numerous unnamed Filipino guerrillas who fought in the occupation.
