= Yay Panlilio =

Filipina-American spy and guerrilla leader

Valeria Panlilio
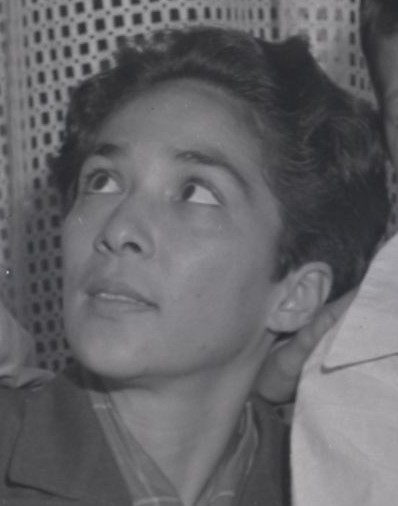
- Panlilio in 1945
- Born: 22 May 1913; Denver, Colorado,
- Died: 12 January 1978; Aquebogue, New York
- Other name: Colonel Yay
- Occupations: Journalist, spy, guerrilla leader

Valeria "Yay" Panlilio (1913–1978), known as Colonel Yay, was an American-Filipina journalist, radio announcer, and guerrilla leader during World War II in the Philippines. After the war she married the commander of the Marking Guerrillas, Marcos Villa Agustin. She was awarded the United States Medal of Freedom for her wartime activities.

== Early life ==
Yay Panlilio's mother, Valentina, came to the United States from the Philippines as a stowaway. Panlilio was born in 1913 in Denver. Her father was an Irish-American. Her mother later married a Filipino named Ildefonso Corpus. Yay's half-brother was named Raymond. The family moved around "living in tenements, boxcars, ranch shacks, and through one severe Colorado winter we had survived in a canvas tent." When Yay was 16 she married Eduardo Panlilio, nine years older than her and a mining engineer. In the early 1930s the couple moved to the Philippines and Panlilio gave birth to three children: a daughter, Rae (born c. 1932) and sons, Edward (b. c. 1935) and Curtis (b. c. 1938). The couple separated before World War II. Eduardo worked and lived in Palawan and Yay remained in Manila.

== Journalist and secret agent ==
In Manila, Panlilio became a reporter, photographer, radio broadcaster, and "the best known woman in the Islands." She was fearless and flamboyant, dressing in a sharkskin suit or brightly colored pants to flout her defiance of the conventional Filipino (and American) idea of a woman's role. She reported on a wide range of topics including politics. She also became an informant to the U.S. Army in the Philippines, passing along tidbits of information she picked up in her work.

On 8 December 1941, the day Japanese forces began invading the Philippines, she was in Baguio working with local reporter James Halsema. Baguio was the first place in the Philippines bombed by Japan. From then on, she became a regular informant of the U.S. Army until the capture of Manila on 2 January 1942. Asked by the Japanese to continue her radio broadcasts, she assented but, according to her, inserted coded messages into the text the Japanese had given her to read. However, as English-speaking Japanese capable of monitoring her broadcasts more closely arrived in Manila her position became tenuous. In early March 1942 in the finale of her radio broadcast, she addressed resistance leader Carlos Romulo directly telling him that the Filipino people would "keep faith" with him and the resistance. She went underground after that broadcast as she was hunted by the Japanese authorities. She left her three children in the care of an American couple, Herbert and Janet Walker, who had not yet been interned by the Japanese because of their advanced ages. She then departed Manila and took refuge in a farmhouse near the town of Binangonan, 30 km (19 miles) southeast of Manila. All three of her children survived the war in hiding.

== Guerrilla leader ==
In July 1942, Panlilio met Marcos Villa Augustin, known as Marking and the leader of Marking Guerrillas, a motley crew of 150 men, partially armed and on the run from the Japanese. Marking was an aggressive but unsophisticated ex-boxer and cab driver. He was "brusque and uncouth;" she was "calculating and sophisticated." Panlilio became the "backbone of the organization" in the words of a U.S. Army report. Soon, the two became lovers and embarked on a stormy relationship. From August 1942 until April 1943, the Marking Guerillas were playing hide-and-seek with Japanese patrols in a 4 miles (6.4 km) by 2 miles (3.2 km) peninsula reaching out into Laguna de Bay. During this time, Panlilio became the de facto second in command, the "brains" of Marking Guerillas, "Colonel Yay," and, later, the namesake of the "Yay Regiment."

In April 1943, the Marking Guerillas moved north and east and operated from bases in the Sierra Madre, spending most of their time moving from place to place to avoid Japanese attacks. Marking was told by American advisors to "lay low" and organize and train until the U.S. invasion of the Philippines (October 1944), an order contrary to his aggressive and independent spirit. By early 1944, Marking claimed, with exaggeration, that he had 200,000 organized men and women in his organization. (The U.S. Army later recognized 12,200 men and women as Marking Guerillas.) To Panlilio fell many of the tasks of accounting for money received from the Americans (before and after the American invasion of the Philippines), communication, and policies. Although the Americans initially regarded Marking and Panlilio as "unscrupulous," their achievements gained support. During her time with the guerrillas Panlilio suffered many health problems: a limp from a leg broken in a pre-war automobile accident, a heart condition, frequent bouts with malaria, and infected teeth.

Marking's fighters were of all ages and came mostly from the lower classes of Filipino society. They competed for resources and recruits with a neighboring guerrilla group, the Hunters ROTC, whose fighters were mainly former ROTC cadets, were younger on average and mostly from the middle and upper classes. The two groups often fought battles with each other until peace between them was finally negotiated by an American officer, Colonel Bernard Anderson, in August 1944. In February 1945 during the Battle of Manila, the Marking Guerrillas captured former Philippine President Emilio Aguinaldo, a collaborator with the Japanese.

The singular achievement of the Marking Guerrillas was the participation of the "Yay Regiment" in May 1945 along with several thousand American soldiers in an operation to prevent the Japanese from destroying the Ipo Dam, an important water source for the city of Manila. In the view of the U.S. Army historian, the Yay Regiment, which suffered 40 dead, deserved "the lion's share of the credit for the capture of the Ipo Dam."

== Later life ==
In February 1945, before the time of the Ipo Dam fight, Panlilio had left the Marking's Guerrillas and went to Manila to see her old friend Carlos Romulo. Marking was enraged that she planned to leave and for her safety she departed in an armored car supplied by the U.S. army. In Manila, she lived in a shanty at the Santo Tomas Internment Camp, recently liberated by the Americans but still occupied by many former American civilian internees with no place to go. Marking followed her to Santo Tomas and her friends hid her. She reunited with her half-brother, Raymond Corpus, a corporal in the U.S. Army, in Santo Tomas. He persuaded her to return to the United States. On 2 April 1945, she and her three children left Manila on the SS John Lykes. Among the passengers were two Americans who had worked in the resistance and became both famous and controversial: Margaret Utinsky and Claire Phillips. Panlilio avoided them.

Arriving in Los Angeles, Panlilio was placed in a slum hotel by the Red Cross. A visiting friend described the hotel as "one of the crummiest she had ever seen." Panlilio's response, reflecting her years as a guerrilla, was "It has walls." Panlilio and her children initially lived with her mother and step-father in Auburn, California. Marking wrote her frequently, informing her that the Yay Regiment was now a brigade and that he wanted her back with him, even sending her 1,250 US dollars contributed by the guerrillas. Marking came to the United States in August 1945 and they were married on 11 September 1945 in Mexico (the site being chosen because their marital status with other partners was uncertain). They returned to the Philippines, but the marriage did not last. Panlilio's memoir, The Crucible, was published in 1950, and she was awarded the Presidential Medal of Freedom by U.S. President Harry S. Truman the same year. In 1955, she began writing a column for a magazine in Manila. In the 1970s she returned to the United States and died in 1978, "her role as a guerrilla leader...forgotten."

== In popular culture ==
- Portrayed by Max Collins in the 2024 television series Pulang Araw.
