= Wha-Chi =

Philippine-Chinese Anti-Japanese Guerrilla Forces
- 菲律宾中国抗日游击队 菲律賓中國抗日游擊隊; Hukbong Gerilya ng Pilipino-Tsino Laban sa Hapon
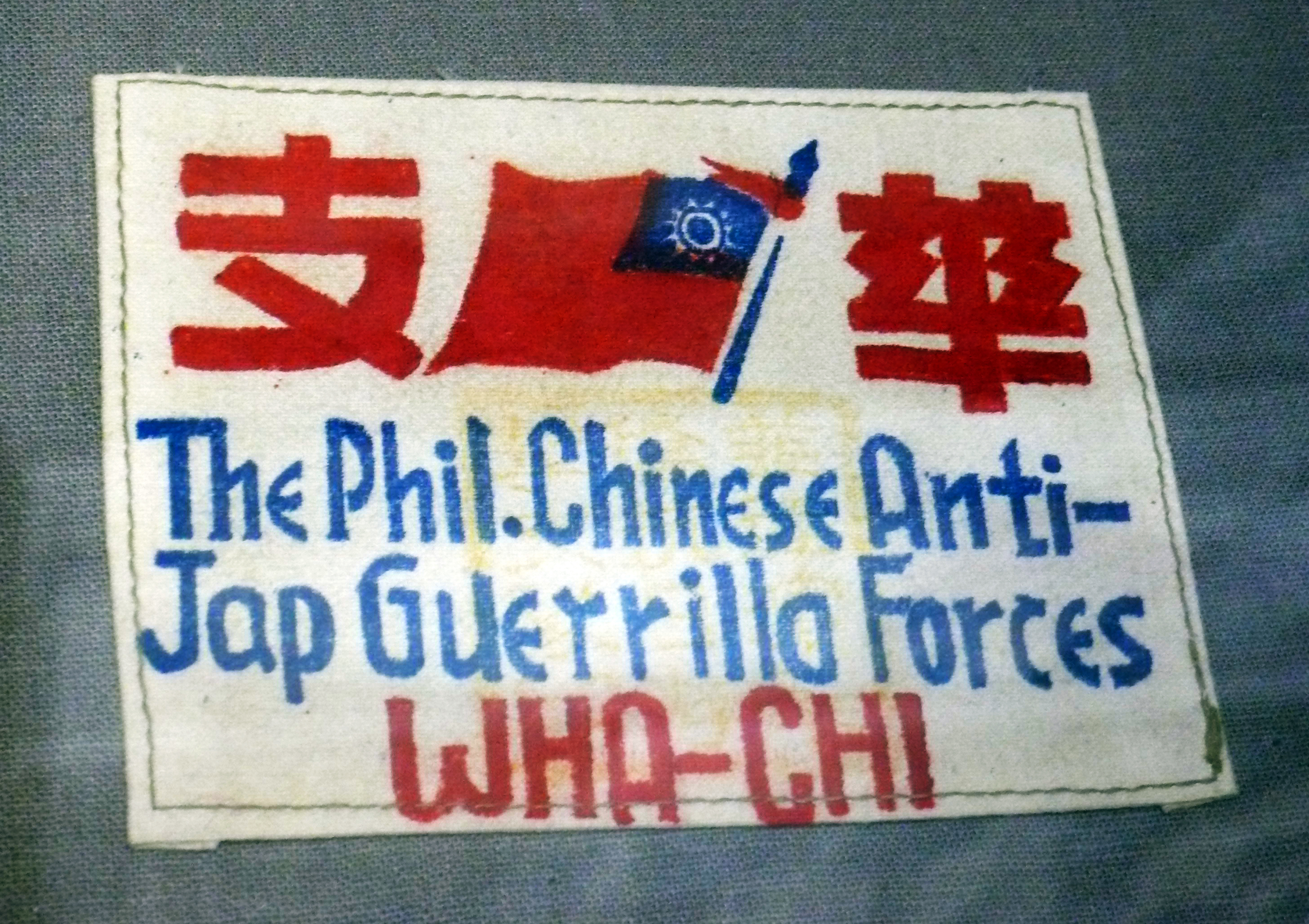
- Arm-tag of the Wha-Chi
- Country: Philippines
- Type: Infantry
- Role: Guerrilla warfare
- Nicknames: Wha-Chi; Squadron 48
- Engagements: World War II

Insignia
- Flag

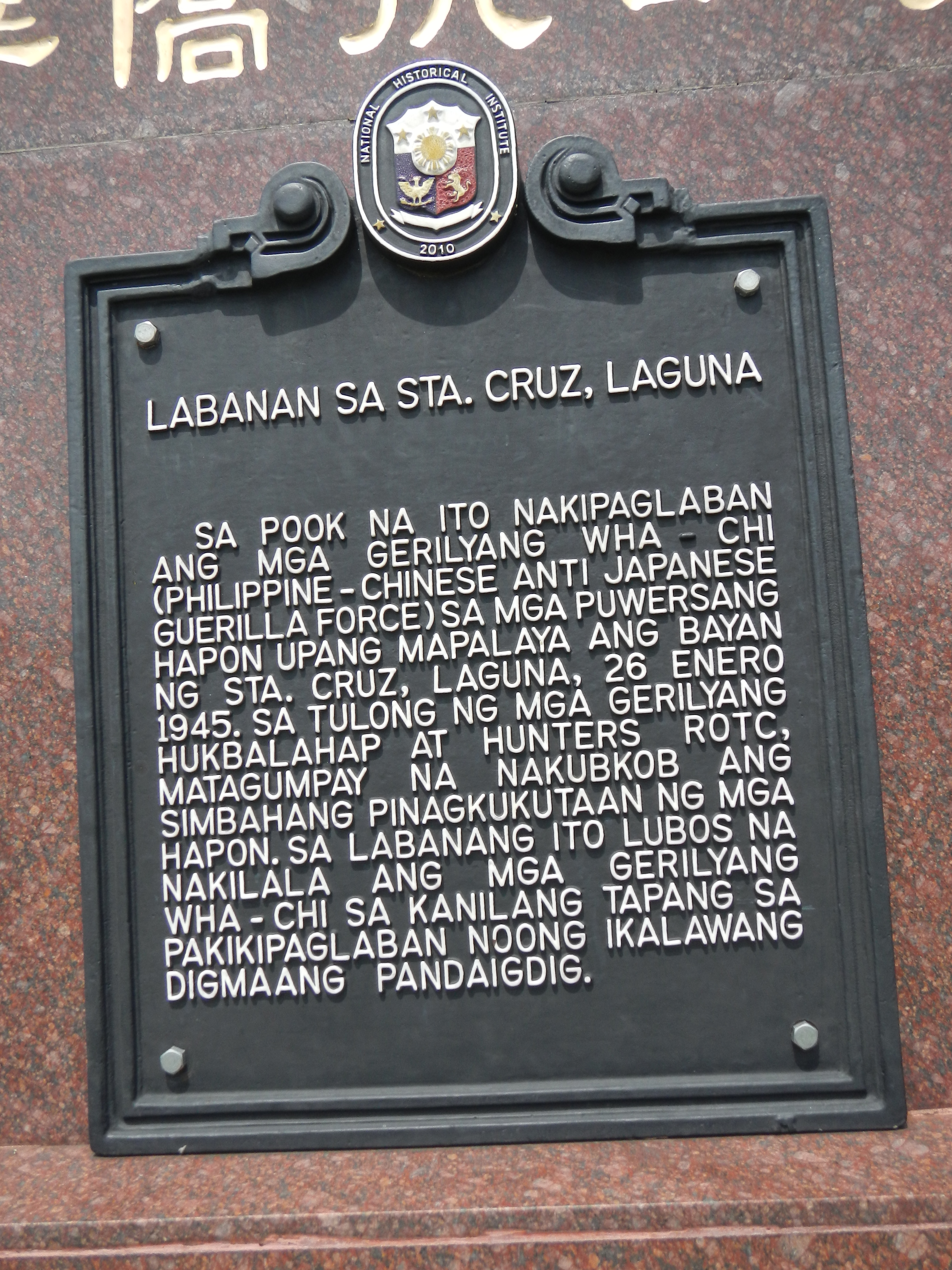
Wha-Chi historical marker

The Wha-Chi (Chinese: 華支; Jyutping: waa^{4} zi^{1}; Pe̍h-ōe-jī: Hôa-chi; lit. 'Chinese Division'), also known as the Philippine-Chinese Anti-Japanese Guerrilla Forces (simplified Chinese: 菲律宾中国抗日游击队; traditional Chinese: 菲律賓中國抗日游擊隊; pinyin: Fēilǜbīn zhōngguó kàngrì yóují duì; Filipino: Hukbong Gerilya ng Pilipino-Tsino Laban sa Hapon), was a Chinese Filipino Philippine resistance group which fought against invading Imperial Japanese forces which occupied the Philippines during World War II.

They are also known as Squadron 48, after the Communist Eighth Route Army and the New Fourth Army of the National Revolutionary Army.

== History ==
The Second Sino-Japanese War broke out in mainland China in 1937 following the Marco Polo Bridge incident which caused the worsening of anti-Japanese sentiment in the region including among the ethnic Chinese community in the Philippines. The war later became part of the larger World War II and the Japanese began to occupy the Philippines in 1941. The Wha-Chi movement began sometime around December 1941 when the United Workers Union in Manila decided to set up a resistance group to fight the Japanese.

The following year Manila was declared an open city as the occupiers strengthened their presence in the archipelago. The Japanese were more suspicious and harsh towards the ethnic Chinese than the local Filipino population. They moved their operations away from Manila as the Japanese increased their presence there around the time when the Bataan Death March occurred. Almost of surrendering 1,000 Chinese-Filipino troops under the Philippine Commonwealth Army, Philippine Scouts and USAFFE units are became the prisoner's of war were marched from the Japanese hands from Mariveles, Bataan to Camp O'Donnell in Capas, Tarlac. Several of their members set up base in various municipalities in the Central Luzon, particularly in the Nueva Ecija-Pampanga area.

They set up base in a barrio at the foot of Mount Arayat and sent children, women, and the elderly to scout their enemy before sending their men to Manila to engage combat against the Japanese. 52 men were left behind, which would form the original core group of the Wha-Chi which was formally established on May 19, 1942. Wha-Chi was formed from the Chinese General Labour Union of the Philippines and the Philippine branch of the Chinese Communist Party which was led by Xu Jingcheng and Li Bingxiang. The Wha-Chi which began with just seven rifles coordinated with Filipino guerrilla groups in the area and collected abandoned weapons to gather more arms. They went to the Pasbul mountains to train themselves. They also fostered connections with the civilian population which reciprocated with supplies of food, medicine, and intelligence.

They returned to Arayat from Pasbul in September 1942 via the Candaba swamp with 38 combatants dying due to malaria.

The guerilla group had at least 700 members with 23 combatants dying during the war. They carried out attacks against the Japanese for the following months with coordination of the Hukbalahap and other local resistance groups. The group later gained reputation among the Japanese which had to deploy 10,000 soldiers to the Mount Arayat area forcing the Wha-Chi to reorganize into several smaller groups and hide in the Candaba swamp for three days. With the help of locals they retreated to Zambales where they once again encountered enemy troops and was forced to traverse the Sierra Madre for 26 days. They reached Laguna near the boundary of the province with Tayabas where they met the Marking Guerillas and Hunter’s ROTC who aided them reach Paete on June 3, 1943 and helped set up four new squadrons for the Hukbalahap. After that they decided to train in Barrio Majayjay in Tayabas for three months.

The Wha-Chi moved to an area near Mount Banahaw where they recruited new members and united various resistance groups. They organized themselves into five squadrons: the first consisting of the original members, the second and third was formed by the Cantonese and Fukienese with each group having 100 members each, the fourth consisting of smaller affiliated groups, and the fifth of fighters based in Bicol. In January 1945 reinforcements from American arrived and the Wha-Chi managed to acquire more arms and ammunition.

Collaborating with the United States Army Forces in the Far East (USAFFE) and the Hukbalahap, they liberated the towns of Cabiao, Jaen, Santa Maria, San Fernando, and Tarlac from Japanese control. They joined the 44th Battalion of the 1st Cavalry Division of U.S. Army in February 1945 and later joining again for the military units of the Philippine Commonwealth Army and Philippine Constabulary from February to August 1945.

After the end of Japanese occupation of the Philippines, many members planned to go to mainland China to join the resistance movement there but Japan surrendered before they could go.

== See also ==
- Hunters ROTC Guerrillas-Chinese Unit (Hunters ROTC)
