= Ipo Dam =

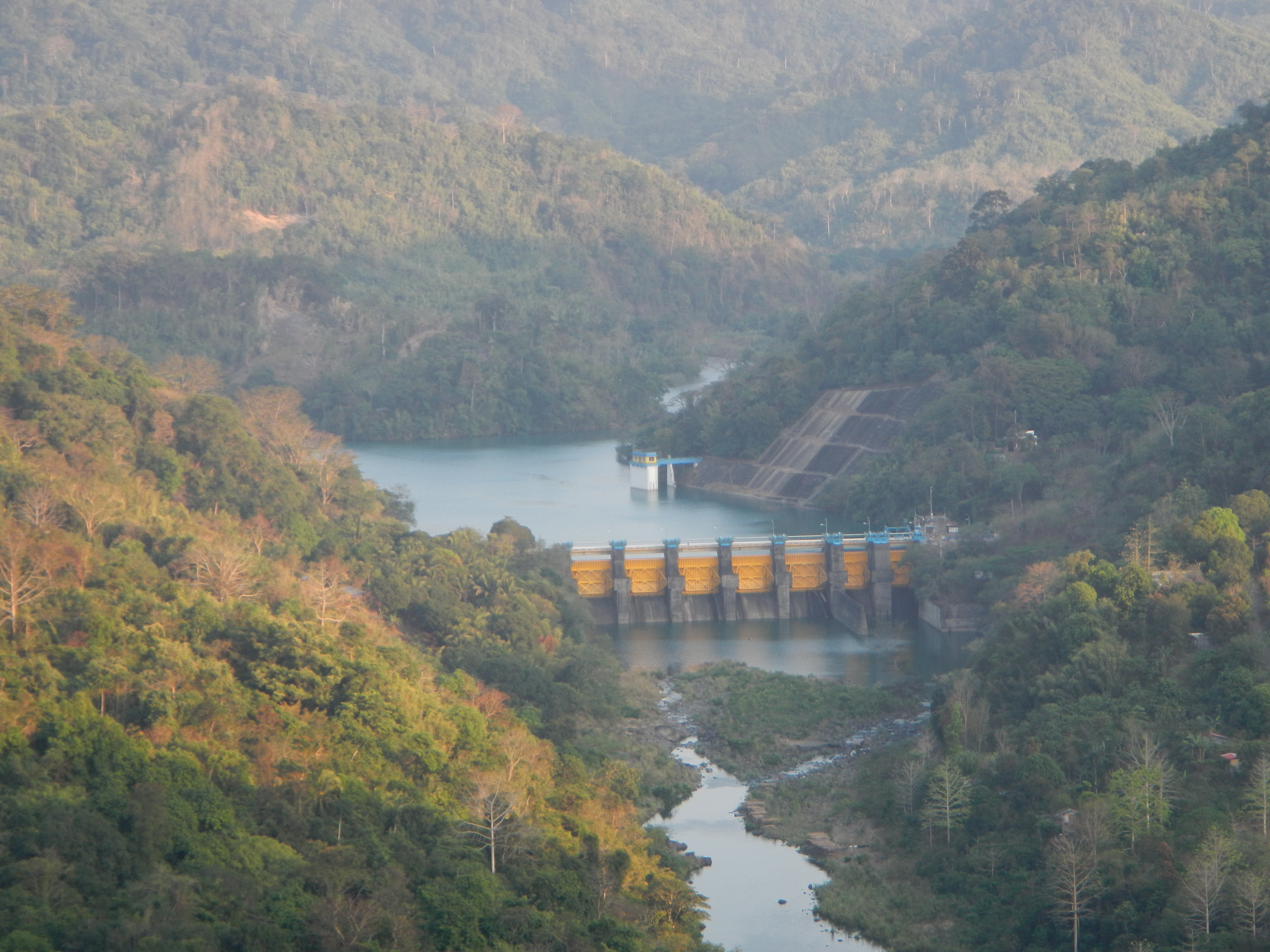
- View of Ipo Dam from San Mateo, Norzagaray, Bulacan.

- Location in Bulacan Location in Luzon Location in the Philippines
- Official name: Ipo Dam
- Location: Barangay San Mateo, Norzagaray, Bulacan, Philippines
- Coordinates: 14°52′N 121°09′E
- Construction began: 1935
- Opening date: December 1938; January 1984
- Operator: Metropolitan Waterworks and Sewerage System

Dam and spillways
- Impounds: Angat River

Reservoir
- Creates: Ipo Reservoir
- Total capacity: 7.5×10^{6} m^{3} (260×10^{6} cu ft)

Ipo Dam is a concrete water reservoir gravity dam found in the Philippines. The dam is located about 7.5 kilometres downstream of the Angat Dam within the Angat Watershed Forest Reserve in Norzagaray, Bulacan. It is a part of the Angat-Ipo-La Mesa water system. Its normal level is 101 m.

The Ipo Dam is a gravity concrete dam located about 7.5 kilometres downstream of the Angat Dam near its confluence with the Ipo River in Bulacan. It was completed in January 1984 with a maximum storage capacity of 7.5 million cubic metres, an increase of about 2,500 million litres per day (MLD) from the old Ipo Dam, which was completed in December 1938 and used to be located 200 metres upstream of the new dam.

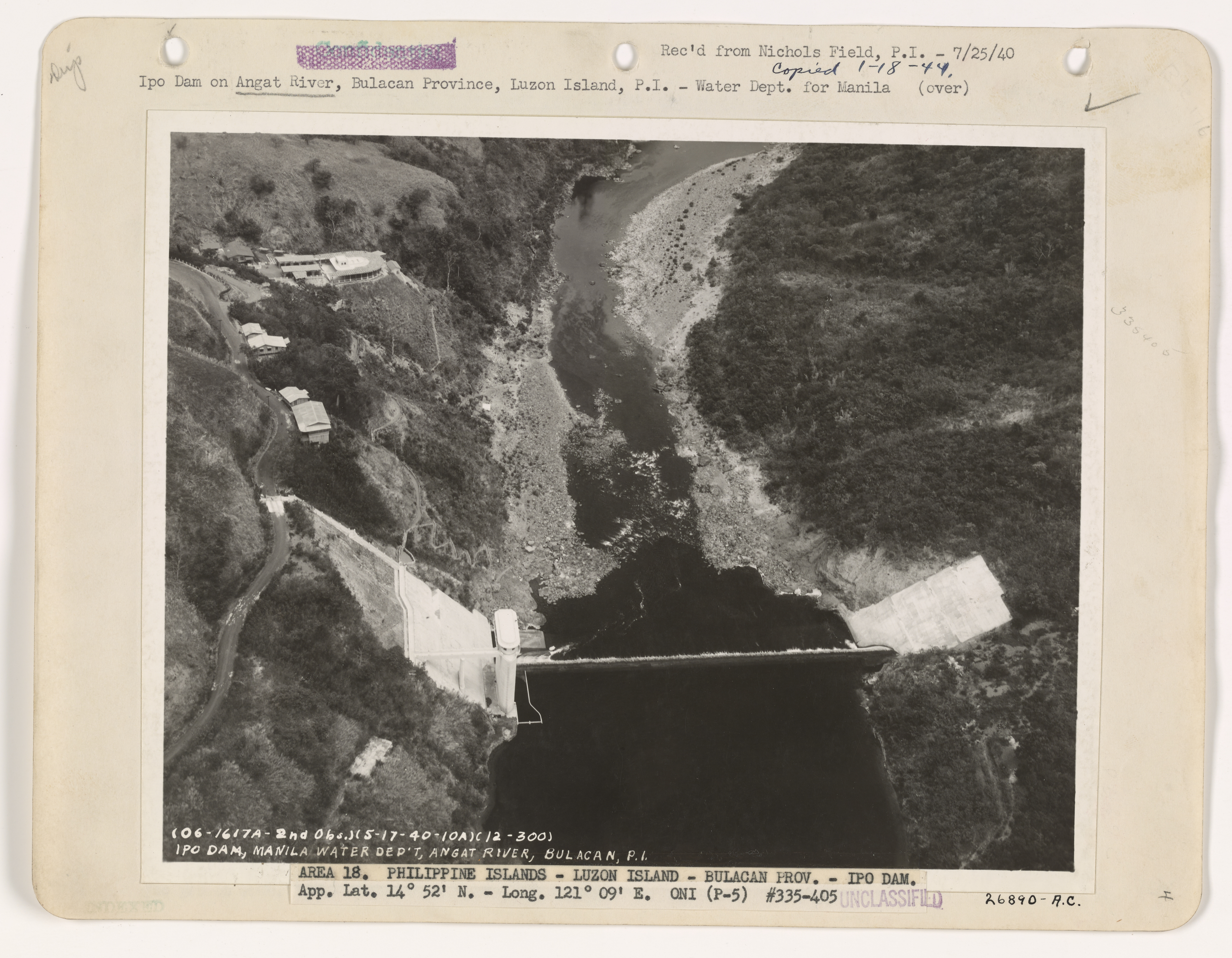
Aerial view of Ipo Dam on Angat River, 1940

The spill level of the dam is at an elevation of 101 metres and it has seven radial floodgates. The watershed topography is characterised by mountainous terrain similar to the Angat Reservoir Watershed with moderate forest cover. The watershed has an area of about 70 square kilometers and receives an average annual rainfall of 3,500 millimeters. Tributaries to the Angat River at this section include the Ipo, Sapa Pako and Sapa Anginon Rivers. These tributaries drain into the Angat River from the eastern section of the watershed.

Water from the dam is diverted to the Novaliches Portal and the La Mesa Dam through three intake structures going down to three connecting tunnels into five connecting aqueducts.

== Battle of Ipo Dam ==
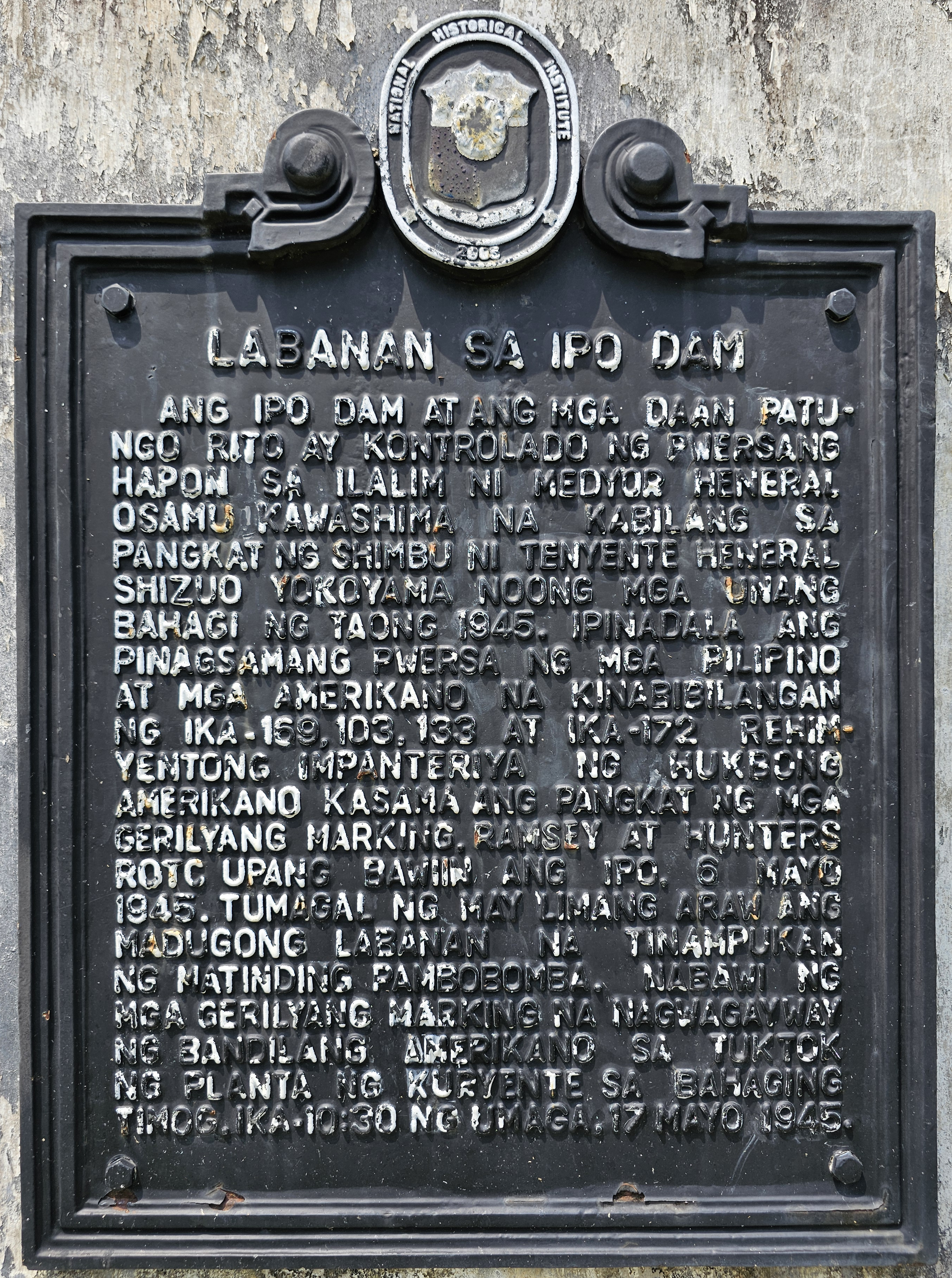
National historical marker commemorating the battle installed near the dam in 2005

On May 19, 1945, during World War II, the dam was captured in the Battle of Ipo Dam. The Yay Regiment of the Marking Guerrillas, under the command of Col. Marcos V. Agustin, and the US Army's 43rd Division, supported by the Fifth Air Force, captured the water source intact from the Japanese defenders.

== See also ==
- Water supply and sanitation in the Philippines
- Energy in the Philippines
