= Terry Adevoso =

Filipino war hero

Eleuterio Adevoso
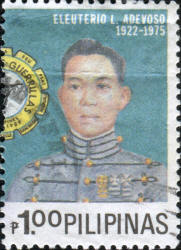
- Adevoso on a 1989 stamp of the Philippines

Secretary of Labor
- In office March 10, 1954 – April 21, 1954
- President: Ramon Magsaysay
- Preceded by: Jose Figueras
- Succeeded by: Angel M. Castaño

Personal details
- Born: Eleuterio Lavengco Adevoso; February 20, 1922 San Juan Rizal, Philippine Islands
- Died: March 22, 1975 (aged 53)
- Party: Liberal (1959)
- Other political affiliations: Progressive (1957–1959)

Eleuterio "Terry" Lavengco Adevoso, also known by his nom de guerre, "Terry Magtanggol" (February 20, 1922 – March 22, 1975) was a Filipino war hero and later cabinet secretary famous for his role as leader and co-founder of Hunters ROTC guerilla unit during the Japanese occupation of the Philippines.

== Career ==
He was briefly appointed as Secretary of Labor in 1954, serving for less than two months under the term of President Ramon Magsaysay. He ran for the Philippine Senate in the 1959 Philippine Senate election, but lost. After the 1961 presidential election, president-elect Diosdado Macapagal of the Liberal Party appointed Adevoso and Amelito Mutuc in December 1961 to head a task force studying the transition process. After Macapagal took office on December 30, 1961, Adevoso was sworn in as his presidential executive assistant, and appointed head of the Presidential Committee on Administration Performance Efficiency.

According to historian Joseph Scalice, Adevoso was recruited by Liberal Senator Sergio Osmeña Jr. to head a covert organization known as the Workshop Group to plot the assassination of President Ferdinand Marcos in the aftermath of Osmeña's loss in the 1969 Philippine presidential election, but failed due to a mole in the organization named Jose Maristela that informed Marcos of the plan. As a member of the opposition, Adevoso was arrested upon the declaration of martial law in September 1972. He was only released in September 1974 after languishing in jail as a political prisoner for two years.

== Personal life ==
Terry married Carmen N. Ferrer after the war and had one child, Jesus Terry F. Adevoso (born 1946). He has three grandchildren, only two of whom he actually met; Johanna Patricia Adevoso-Cañal (born 1970) and Jay Paolo Adevoso (born 1971). The third grandchild, Jenna Crystal Adevoso-Galang, was born in 1985.

== See also ==
- Japanese occupation of the Philippines
- Hunters ROTC
- Ramon A. Alcaraz
- Bonifacio Mencias
- Jesus Villamor
