= Hunters ROTC =

WWII Filipino resistance group

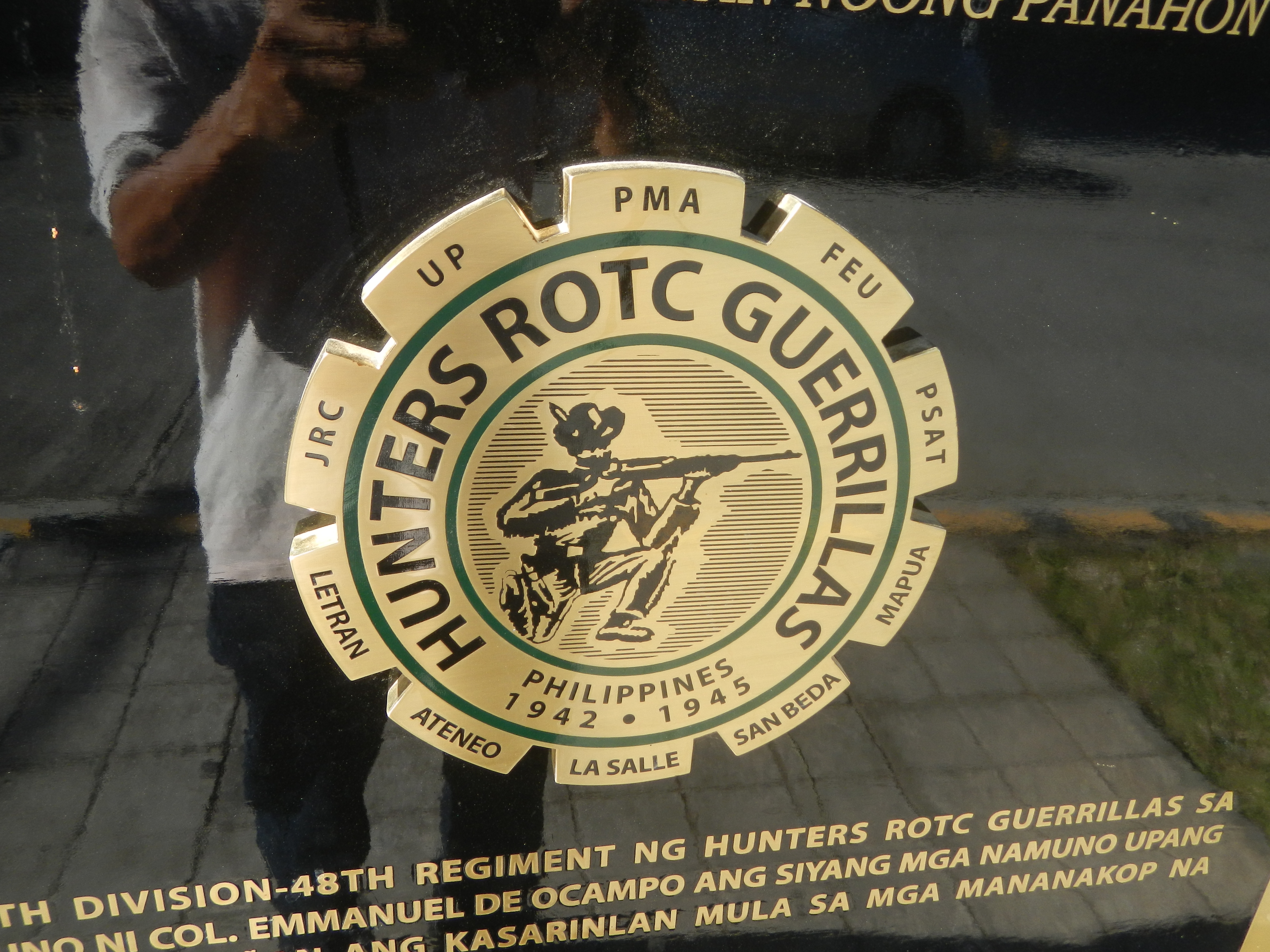
- Hunters ROTC Emblem
- Active: 1941–1945
- Country: Philippines
- Allegiance: United States
- Role: Resistance movement
- Nickname: "The Hunters"
- Engagements: World War II: Battle of Lucena; Battle of Manila; Raid at Los Baños

The Hunters ROTC was a Filipino resistance group that fought against Japanese forces in the Pacific theater during World War II. It was a guerrilla unit active during the Japanese occupation of the Philippines, and was the main anti-Japanese resistance group active in the area near Manila, the capital of the Philippines. It was created upon the dissolution of the Philippine Military Academy.

Cadet Terry Adevoso refused to go home as cadets were ordered to do and began recruiting fighters willing to undertake guerrilla action against the Japanese. Aside from engaging enemy forces in active combat, they also provided intelligence to the American forces led by General Douglas MacArthur during the Liberation of the Philippines. The Hunters ROTC took an active role in numerous battles, such as the Raid at Los Baños and the defense and recapture of Lucena City.

== Origin ==
When war broke out in the Philippines, the staff and cadets of the Philippine Military Academy came down from Baguio to Manila. On December 19, 1941 on the grounds of the University of Santo Tomas the cadets of Class 1942 and 1943 graduated earlier and received their commissions, under their Superintendent Col. Fidel V. Segundo (USMA 1917) forming the 1st Regular Division.

An estimated 300 cadets of Class 1944 and 1945 were in turn disbanded and told to go home as they were considered too young to fight in the war. The cadets of these classes formed the nucleus of the Hunters ROTC by January 1942, with Miguel Ver in command, and Eleuterio Adevoso as his executive officer.

The Hunters ROTC banded together in a common desire to contribute to the war effort throughout the Bataan campaign. They worked to protect civilians and to assist the USAFFE forces by way of intelligence and propaganda. They were founded in Manila in January 1942 by Miguel Ver of the Philippine Military Academy, and moved to Rizal Province in April where they came under Col. Hugh Straughn's FAIT. After the Japanese captured Straughn and Ver the executive officer, Eleuterio Adevoso took over.

== Japanese occupation ==
Many stories of sacrifice and heroism have been passed down through generations of former Hunters ROTC members.

As recalled by one former member, Damaso Fernandez, the omnipresent reign of the Imperial Japanese Forces in Manila was punctuated with talks of severe punishment, often times through threats of torture or murdering one's family if caught engaging in anti-Japanese activities. In one particular instance that is etched in Damaso's mind, he was hiding a piece of intelligence that can be used against the Imperial Japanese Forces. This piece of information was hidden within his pillowcase. Unfortunately for Damaso, his household would be raided by Japanese forces. They would search for incriminating evidence to use against him and his family, even searching his mattress. They would not find the intel hidden within his pillowcase.

After the surrender of American and Filipino forces on Bataan, the Hunters ROTC relocated to the Antipolo mountains.

The Hunters originally conducted operations with another guerrilla group called Marking Guerrillas, with whom they went about liquidating Japanese spies. Led by Miguel Ver, a PMA cadet, the Hunters raided the enemy-occupied Union College in Manila and seized 130 Enfield rifles.

The Hunters are largely considered to be one of the more effective resistance movements within South Luzon.

== Philippine Liberation Campaign ==
The Hunters ROTC were among the most aggressive guerrillas in the war. According to some existing records, the Hunters ROTC launched a daring guerrilla raid on the 24th of June, 1944 at the New Bilibid Prison, which at the time was used by the Japanese, in Muntinlupa, Rizal. Collaborating with the Fil-American Cavite Guerilla Forces (FACGF) of General Mariano N. Castaneda, they began the offensive with the objective of freeing captured members of the Allied forces and obtaining more than 300 rifles located within the compound. This was the only time an armed force was able to successfully enter New Bilibid.

One of the most famous successes of the Hunters ROTC was their participation in the liberation of Los Baños prison camp on February 23, 1945. While units of the 11th Airborne Division came over to Los Baños, members of the Hunters ROTC pre-positioned themselves around the camp a few days before, relaying up-to-date intelligence reports on the camp. Captain Bartolome Cabangbang, leader of the Central Luzon Penetration Party, said that the Hunters supplied the best intelligence data on Luzon.

During the Battle of Manila of 1945, the Hunters ROTC, under the command of Lt. Col. Emmanuel V. de Ocampo, fought with the U.S. Army from Nasugbu, Batangas to the Manila General Post Office. The Hunters also jointly operated with the Philippine Commonwealth Army and Philippine Constabulary and the American soldiers and military officers of the United States Army in many operations in Manila, Rizal, Cavite, Laguna, Batangas and Tayabas (now Quezon).

== Postwar activities ==
A number of Hunters ROTC members, notably Terry Adevoso, were active in political organizing in the years before martial law, even if they did not themselves run. Upon the declaration of Martial Law in September 1972, Adevoso was detained along with other political opposition figures. He was only released in September 1974 after languishing in jail as a political prisoner for two years.

== Legacy ==
The Headquarters Philippine Army (HPA) parade ground at Fort Bonifacio is named Hunters ROTC Field. In February 1945, this area of Sakura Heiei (Cherry Blossom Barracks), as this military installation had been renamed by the Japanese, was overrun by the Forty-seventh ROTC Division as it led the advance of American Eleventh Airborne Division into this military installation.

Additionally, in Quezon City, there is a street named Hunters ROTC, and in Cainta a street formerly named St. Francis Avenue now bears the name Hunters ROTC Avenue. There is a memorial along the latter road dedicated to the guerrilla organization.

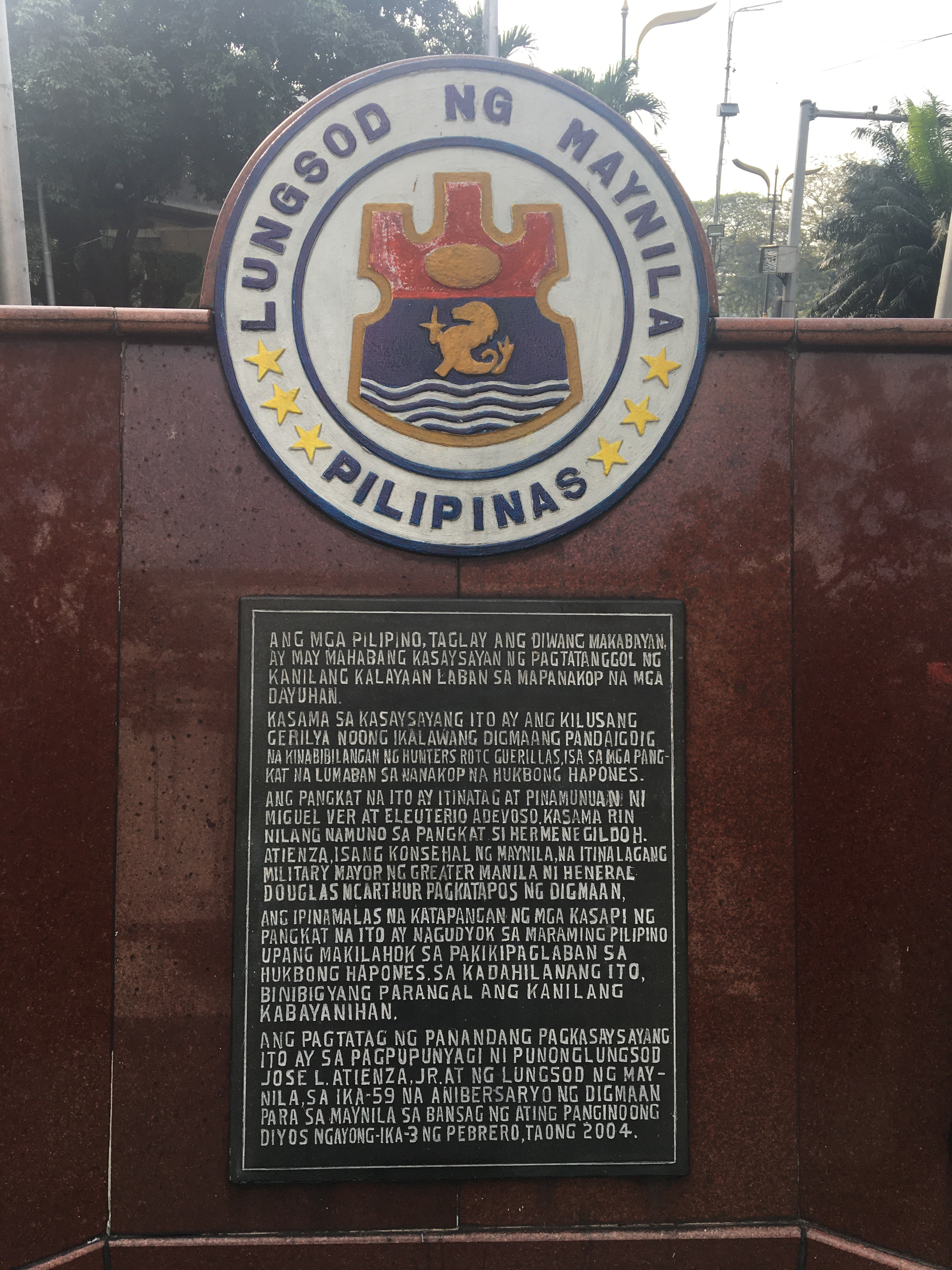
Hunters ROTC Commemorative Marker in Freedom Triangle Plaza, Manila City Hall

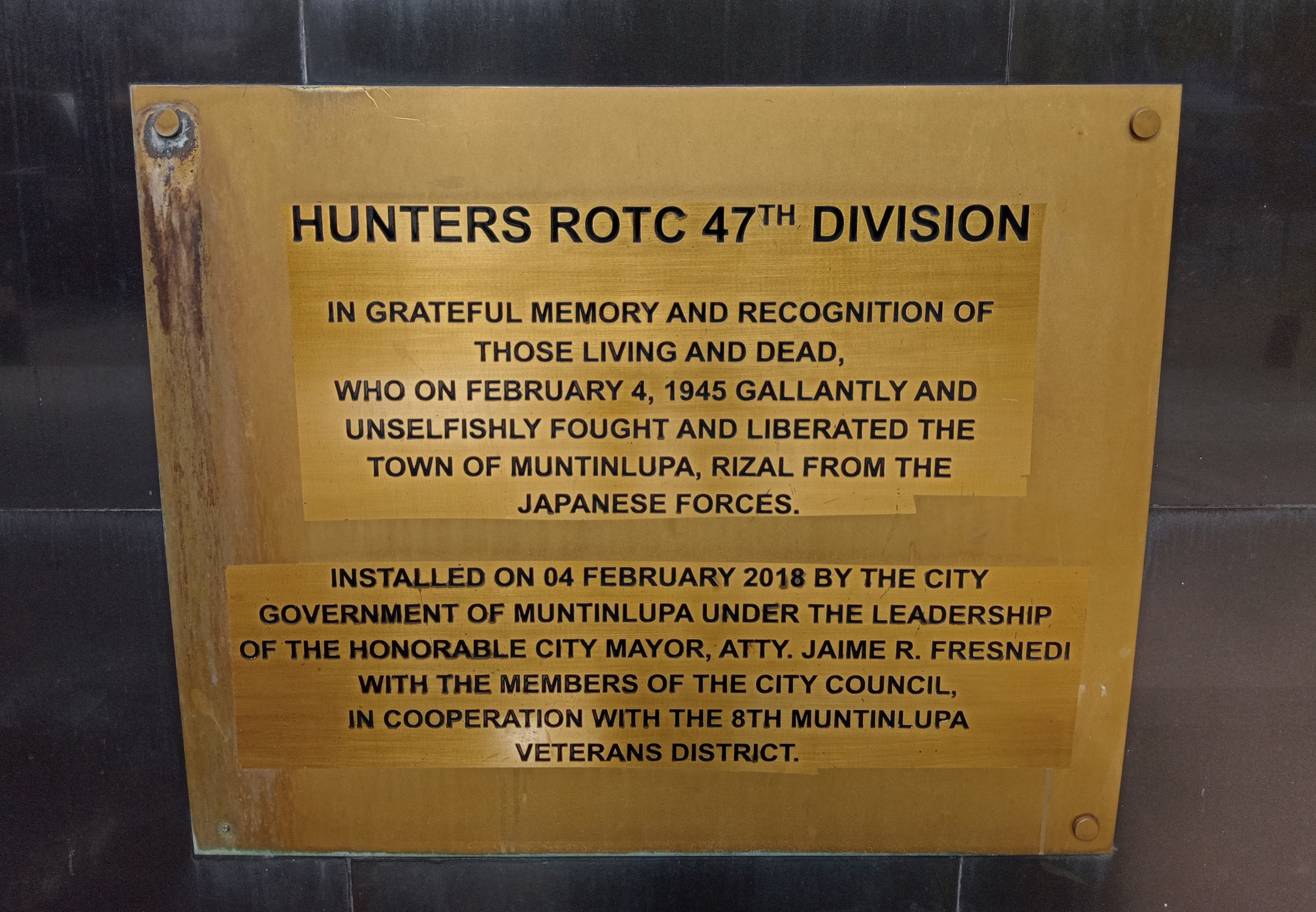
Hunters ROTC 47th Division Marker in Muntinlupa

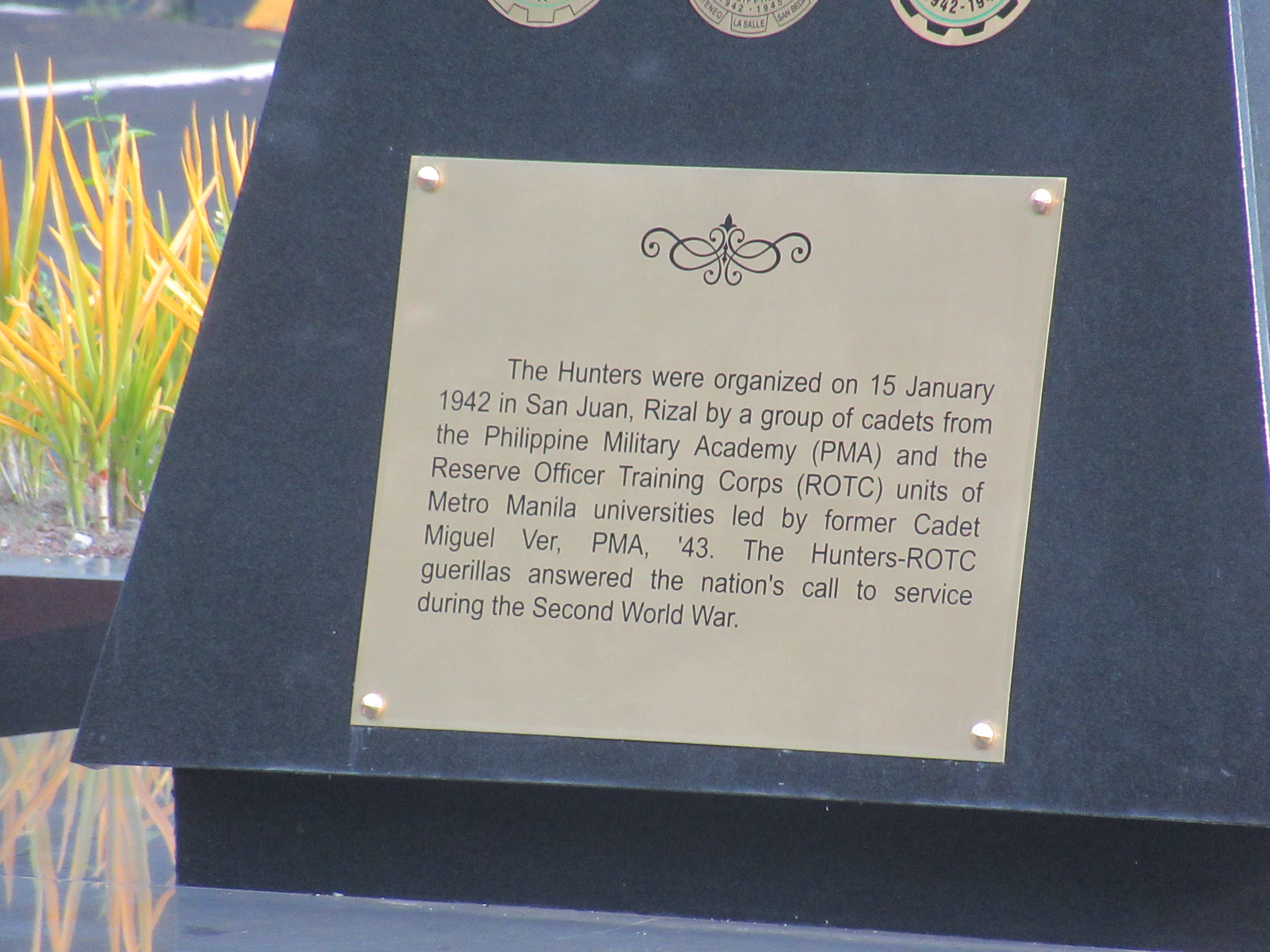
Hunters ROTC Plaque in Bonifacio Global City Business District of Taguig City

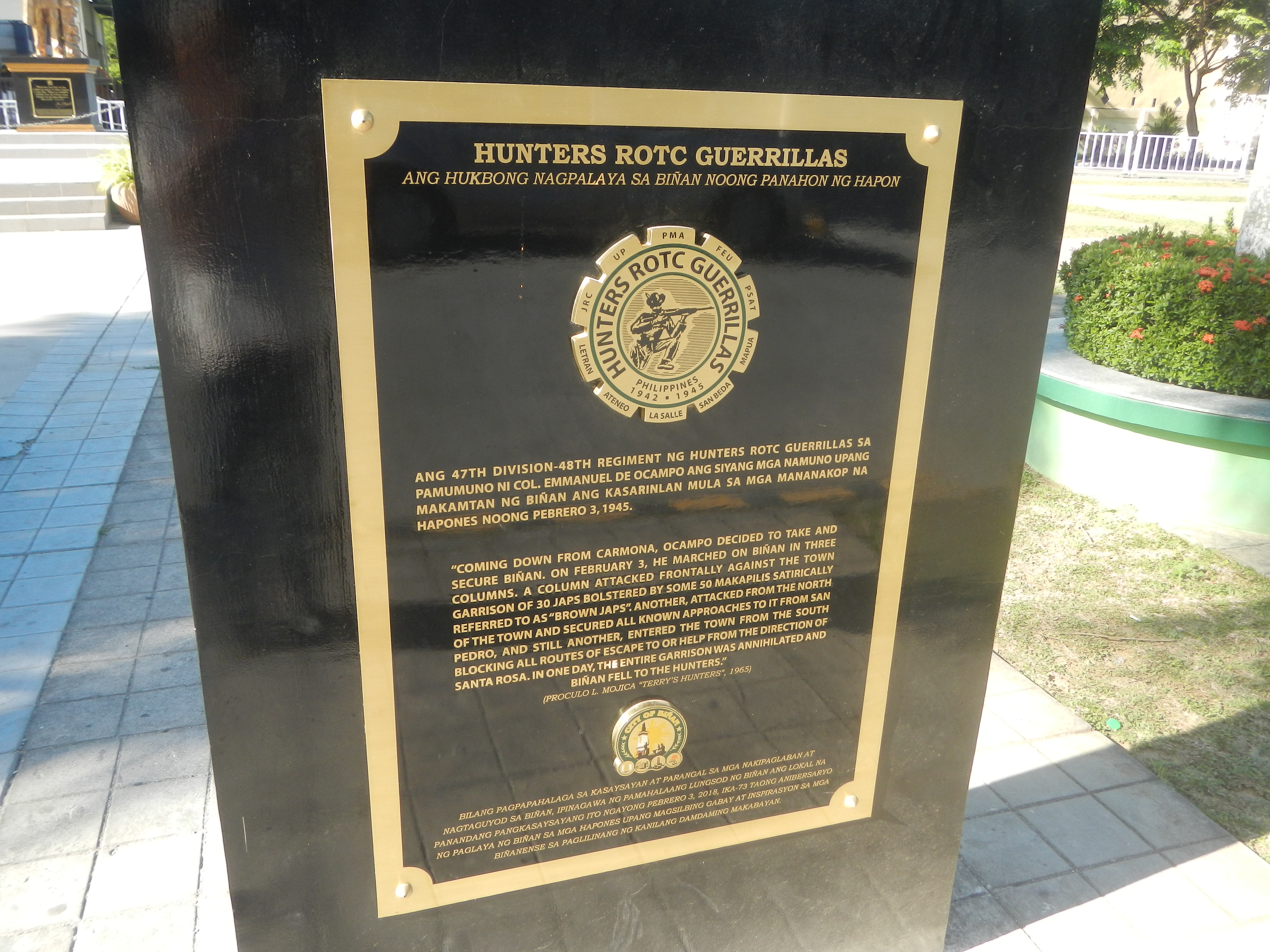
Commemorative Plaque in Biñan City, Laguna

== In film ==
- "Representatives of Brazil, Argentina and Poland arrive for inauguration ceremony of Republic of the Philippines." 1946. (criticalpast.com)
- Death was a Stranger. 1963.
- Unsurrendered 2: The Hunters ROTC Guerrillas. Written and directed by Bani Logroño. 2015.
- Pulang Araw. War Drama Series. Written by Suzette Doctolero. Directed by Dominic Zapata. 2024

== See also ==
- Reserve Officers' Training Corps in the Philippines
- List of American guerrillas in the Philippines
