= 6th Battalion, 14th Field Artillery (United States) =

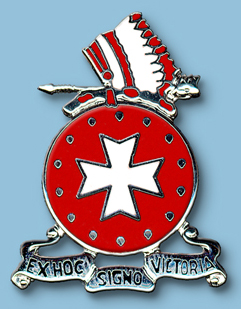
- 14th Field Artillery distinctive unit insignia
- Active: 1916–1988
- Country: United States
- Branch: Regular Army
- Nickname: "Warbonnets"
- Motto: "Ex Hoc Signo Victoria" (Victory By This Sign)
- Engagements: World War II; Vietnam War
- Decorations: Presidential Unit Citation

The 6th Battalion, 14th Field Artillery Regiment (United States) was a field artillery battalion of the United States Army. The unit nickname follows the 14th Field Artillery nickname "Warbonnets" with the motto "Ex Hoc Signo Victoria" (Victory By This Sign)

== Unit assignment ==
Constituted 1 July 1916 in the Regular Army as Battery F, 14th Field Artillery. Inactivated 16 January 1988 in Germany and relieved from assignment to the 1st Armored Division.

== Lineage ==
- Constituted 1 July 1916 in the Regular Army as Battery F, 14th Field Artillery.
- Organized 1 June 1917 at Fort Sill, Oklahoma.

Inactivated 1 September 1921 at Fort Sill, Oklahoma. (14th Field Artillery assigned 15 December 1922 to the 6th Division; relieved 7 September 1927 from assignment to the 6th Division and assigned to the 7th Division.) Activated 1 December 1934 at Fort Snelling, Minnesota. Inactivated 1 July 1939 at Fort Snelling, Minnesota. (14th Field Artillery relieved 16 October 1939 from assignment to the 7th Division.) Activated 15 July 1940 Fort Benning, Georgia, as an element of the 2d Armored Division. Absorbed 8 January 1942 by Battery C, 14th Armored Field Artillery Battalion. (Battery C, 14th Field Artillery, reorganized and redesignated 8 January 1942 as Battery C, 14th Armored Field Artillery Battalion.) Former Battery F, 14th Field Artillery, reconstituted I April 1957 in the Regular Army and redesignated as Headquarters and Headquarters Battery, 6th Battalion, 14th Artillery. Activated 15 April 1963 at Fort Sill, Oklahoma (organic elements constituted 27 February 1963 and 15 April 1963). Battalion inactivated 4 December 1970 at Fort Lewis, Washington. Redesignated I September 1971 as the 6th Battalion 14th Field Artillery. Assigned 13 September 1972 to the 1st Armored Division and activated in Germany. Inactivated 16 January 1988 in Germany and relieved from assignment to the 1st Armored Division.

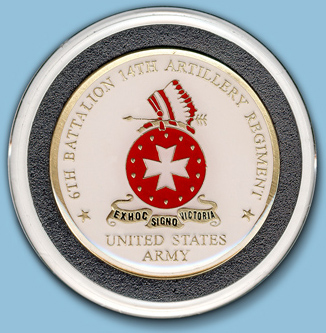
6th Battalion 14th Field Artillery challenge coin (face)

== Campaign participation credit ==
=== World War II ===
- Sicily (with arrowhead)
- Normandy
- Northern France
- Rhineland
- Ardennes-Alsace
- Central Europe

=== Vietnam War ===
- Defense
- Counteroffensive
- Counteroffensive, Phase 11
- Counteroffensive. Phase III
- Tet Counteroffensive
- Counteroffensive, Phase IV
- Counteroffensive, Phase V
- Counteroffensive, Phase VI
- Tet 69/Counteroffensive
- Summer-Fall 1969
- Winter-Spring 1970
- Sanctuary Counteroffensive
- Counteroffensive, Phase VII

== Decorations ==
- Presidential Unit Citation (Army), Streamer embroidered (14th Armored Field Artillery Battalion cited; WD GO 108, 1945)
- Presidential Unit Citation (Army), Streamer embroidered PROVINCE (6th Battalion 14th Artillery, cited; DA GO 40, 1967)
- Meritorious Unit Commendation, Streamer embroidered 1965–1967 (6th Battalion 14th Artillery, cited; DA GO 48, 1968)
- Belgian Fourragere 1940 (14th Armored Field Artillery Battalion cited; DA GO 43, 1950)
- Cited in the Order of the Day of the Belgian Army for action in the ARDENNES (14th Armored Field Artillery Battalion cited; DA GO 43, 1950)
- Cited in the order of the Day of the Belgian Army for action in Belgium (14th Armored Field Artillery Battalion cited; DA GO 43, 1950)
- Republic of Vietnam Cross of Gallantry with Palm, Streamer embroidered VIETNAM 106-0-1970 (6th Battalion 14th Artillery, cited; DA GO 55, 1971)
- Republic of Vietnam Cross of Gallantry with Palm, Streamer embroidered VIETNAM 1970 (6th Battalion 14th Artillery, cited; DA GO 1974)
- Battery A additionally entitled to Presidential Unit Citation (Army embroidered PLEIKU PROVINCE (Batteries A and B, 6th Battalion 14th Artillery, cited; DA GO 69, 1969)
- Battery B additionally entitled to Presidential Unit Citation (Army) Streamer embroidered PLEIKU PROVINCE (Batteries A and B, 6th Battalion, 14th Artillery, cited; DA GO 69, 1969), and Valorous Unit Award, Streamer embroidered DAK TO-BEN HET (Battery B, 6th Battalion, 14th Artillery, cited; DA GO 48, 1971)
- Battery C additionally entitled to Presidential Unit Citation (Army) Streamer embroidered DAK TO DISTRICT (Battery C. 6th Battalion 14th Artillery, cited; DA GO 38, 1971)

== Killed in action ==
=== Vietnam War ===
- Wyles, Donald C., Pvt. – Field Artillery – United States Army, A Btry 6th Battalion 14th Artillery, I Field Force Vietnam Artillery Date of action: 10 June 1966 – Listing at The Virtual Wall
- Whitehead, William C., Major – Field Artillery – United States Army, 6th Battalion 14th Artillery, I Field Force Vietnam Artillery 0076P2L Date of action: 30 June 1968 – Listing at The Virtual Wall
- Kelly, George T. III, First Lieutenant – Field Artillery – United States Army, Battery C, 6th Battalion 14th Artillery, I Field Force Vietnam Artillery, APO 96350 Awarded: Distinguished Service Cross Date of action: 22 April 1970 Theater: Republic of Vietnam Read Remembrances – Listing at The Virtual Wall
- Musich, John P., SP4 – Field Artillery – United States Army, 6th Battalion 14th Artillery, I Field Force Vietnam Artillery 91B20 Date of action: 30 October 1970 – Listing at The Virtual Wall
- Owens, Carl E., SP4 – Field Artillery – United States Army, 6th Battalion 14th Artillery, I Field Force Vietnam Artillery 13A10 Date of action: 30 October 1970 – Listing at The Virtual Wall
- Richardson, Gary W., SP4 – Field Artillery – United States Army, 6th Battalion 14th Artillery, I Field Force Vietnam Artillery 52B20 Date of action: 30 October 1970 – Listing at The Virtual Wall

== Bibliography ==
- Lamerson, John D., The Phantom of Ben Het, Vietnam: The Missing Chapter. Lamerson Publishing, 2001 The Phantom of Ben Het
- Blumenson, Martin. Breakout and Pursuit. United States Army in World War II. Washington: Government Printing Office, 1961.
- Coleman, J. D., ed. 1st Air Cavalry Division, Memories of the First Team, Vietnam, August 1965 – December 1969.
- Tokyo: Dai Nipon Printing Co., 1970. Contains information about the 6th Battalion 14th Field Artillery.
- Dutchak, Eugene, ed. 2d Armored Division, Fort Hood, Texas, 1961 – Topeka: Josten Military Publications, 1962. Contains information about the 1st Battalion 14th Field Artillery.
- Harrison, Gordon A. Cross-Channel Attack. United States Army in World War II. Washington: Government Printing Office, 1951 Historical Division, War Department. Utah Beach to Cherbourg (6–27 June 1944). *American Forces in Action. Washington: Government Printing Office, 1945.
- Houston, Donald E. Hell on Wheels: The 2d Armored Division. San Rafael, California: Presidio Press, 1977.
- Marshall, S.L.A. West to Cambodia. New York: Cowles Education Corporation, 1968. Contains information about the 6th Battalion 14th Field Artillery.
- "Readiness Shown by 'Project Partnership.'" Field Artillery Journal (September–October 1974):61. Pertains to the 6th Battalion 14th Field Artillery.
- 2d Armored Division "Hell on Wheels," Fort Hood, Texas, 1965. Baton Rouge: Army and Navy Publishing Co., 1965. Contains information about 1st Battalion 14th Field Artillery.
- Trahan, E. A., ed. A History of the Second United States Armored Division, 1940–1946. Atlanta: Albert Love Enterprises, 1947.
