= 205th Infantry Brigade (United States) =

- Shoulder sleeve insignia
- Active: 24 June 1921–22 September 1945 (various designations); 15 April 1947–18 May 1959 (103rd Recon. Co.); 1 February 1963–15 September 1994 (205th Infantry Bge.); 24 October 1997–16 October 1999; 1 December 2006–10 November 2015
- Country: United States
- Branch: United States Army
- Role: Infantry, Training
- Size: Brigade
- Part of: First Army Division East
- Garrison/HQ: Camp Atterbury
- Motto: "Star of the North"
- Engagements: World War II; Rhineland; Ardennes-Alsace; Central Europe

Insignia
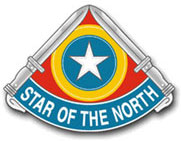
- Distinctive unit insignia

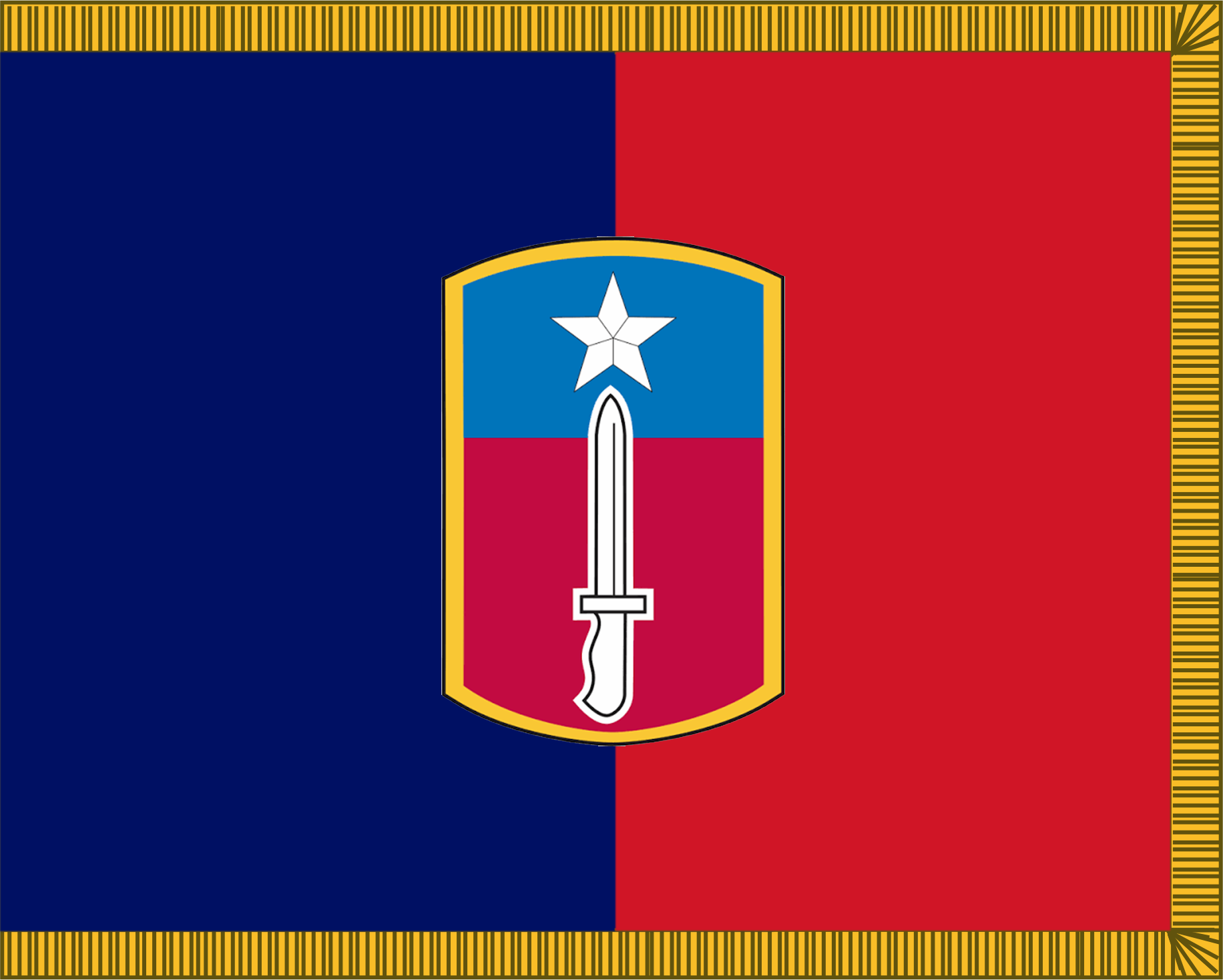
- 205th Infantry Brigade Flag

The 205th Infantry Brigade, was first formed as part of the United States Army Reserve's 103rd Division. It was active from 1921 to 1942 and then from 1963 through 1994, and then reformed in 2006.

It was initially formed within the Organized Reserve Corps in Arizona and New Mexico, including the 409th and 410th Regiments. Its sister brigade within the 103rd Division was the 206th Brigade in Colorado, which included the 411th and 412th Regiments.

== Lineage ==
- Constituted 24 June 1921 in the Organized Reserves as Headquarters and Headquarters Company, 205th Infantry Brigade, and assigned to the 103rd Division
- Organized in November 1921 at Warren, Arizona
- Redesignated 23 March 1925 as Headquarters and Headquarters Company, 205th Brigade
- Redesignated 24 August 1936 as Headquarters and Headquarters Company, 205th Infantry Brigade
- Converted and redesignated 11 February 1942 as the 103rd Reconnaissance Troop (less 3rd Platoon), 103rd Division (Headquarters and Headquarters Company, 206th Infantry Brigade, concurrently converted and redesignated as the 3rd Platoon, 103rd Reconnaissance Troop, 103rd Division)
- Troop ordered into active military service 15 November 1942 and reorganized at Camp Claiborne, Louisiana, as the 103rd Cavalry Reconnaissance Troop, an element of the 103rd Infantry Division
- Reorganized and redesignated 8 August 1943 as the 103rd Reconnaissance Troop, Mechanized
- Inactivated 22 September 1945 at Camp Patrick Henry, Virginia
- Redesignated 15 April 1947 as the 103rd Mechanized Cavalry Reconnaissance Troop
- Activated 28 April 1947 at Council Bluffs, Iowa
- Organized Reserves redesignated 25 March 1948 as the Organized Reserve Corps.
- Reorganized and redesignated 25 November 1949 as the 103rd Reconnaissance Company
- Organized Reserve Corps redesignated 9 July 1952 as the Army Reserve.
- Inactivated 18 May 1959 at Council Bluffs, Iowa
- Converted and redesignated (less 3rd Platoon) 1 February 1963 as Headquarters and Headquarters Company, 205th Infantry Brigade, and relieved from assignment to the 103rd Infantry Division; concurrently activated at Fort Snelling, Minnesota (3d Platoon, 103rd Reconnaissance Company concurrently redesignated as Headquarters and Headquarters Company, 206th Infantry Brigade—hereafter separate lineage)
- Inactivated 15 September 1994 at Fort Snelling, Minnesota
- Withdrawn 24 October 1997 from the Army Reserve and allotted to the Regular Army; Headquarters concurrently activated at Fort Benjamin Harrison, Indiana
- Inactivated 6 October 1999 at Fort Benjamin Harrison, Indiana
- Headquarters activated 1 December 2006 at Indianapolis, Indiana
- Inactivated 10 November 2015 at Camp Atterbury, Indiana, reorganized under the 157th Combined Arms Training Brigade

== Honors ==
=== Campaign participation credit ===
- World War II
1. Rhineland,
2. Ardennes-Alsace,
3. Central Europe

=== Decorations ===
Army Superior Unit Award for service from 1 June 2008 to 30 September 2011

== Cold War ==
The brigade was organized as a separate infantry brigade in Minnesota and Iowa. It was later assigned as a roundout element for the 6th Infantry Division (Light) in Alaska and served as the only light infantry brigade in the Army Reserve. The Brigade consisted of:

- Headquarters and Headquarters Company
- 3rd Battalion, 3rd Infantry Regiment
- 1st Battalion, 409th Infantry Regiment
- 1st Battalion, 410th Infantry Regiment
- 3rd Battalion, 14th Field Artillery Regiment

== Present ==
In December 2006, the 205th Infantry Brigade was activated using the personnel and assets of 3rd Brigade, 85th Division (Training Support) and assumed the mission to train Army Reserve and National Guard units. The 205th Infantry Brigade is a multi-component team consisting of active, reserve and National Guard soldiers and DA civilians with a primary focus being post-mobilization training of U.S. Army forces bound to support Operation Enduring Freedom, Operation Iraqi Freedom, and Multi National Task Force (East), Kosovo. The brigade primarily operates and trains at Camp Atterbury, Indiana. The brigade also has the mission of training Army Reserve units in Michigan, Ohio, and Indiana to ensure their combat readiness.

The Brigade was subsequently inactivated on 10 November 2015 at Camp Atterbury, Indiana.

=== Organization ===
The unit is composed of a headquarters company and subordinate training battalions:

- Headquarters and Headquarters Company, 205th Infantry Brigade
- 1st Battalion, 290th Regiment (Field Artillery)
- 1st Battalion, 335th Regiment (Infantry) – Indianapolis, Indiana
- 1st Battalion, 349th Regiment (Logistics Support)
- 1st Battalion, 411th Regiment (Logistics Support)
- 3d Battalion, 411th Regiment (Logistics Support) – Indianapolis, Indiana
