= USS Admiral C. F. Hughes =

American transport ship

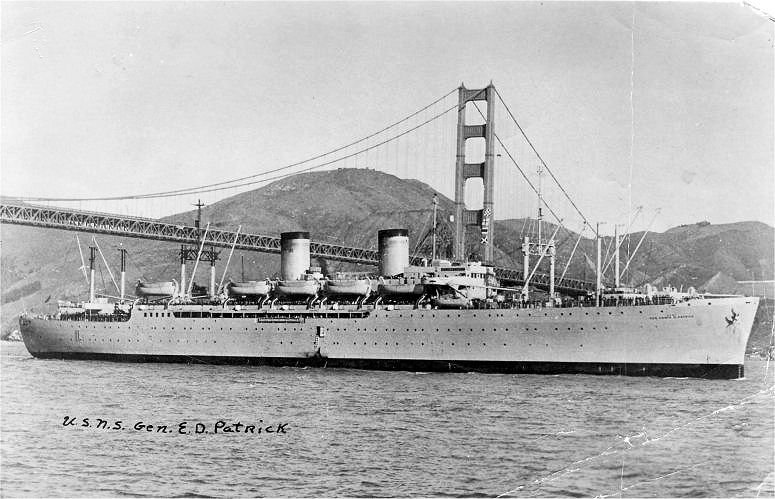

History

United States
- Name: USS Admiral C. F. Hughes (AP-124)
- Namesake: Admiral Charles Frederick Hughes, US Navy
- Builder: Bethlehem-Alameda Shipyard Inc., Alameda, California
- Laid down: 29 November 1943
- Launched: 27 July 1944
- Sponsored by: Mrs. Louisa Nimitz
- Commissioned: 31 January 1945
- Decommissioned: 3 May 1946
- Identification: MC type P2-SE2-R1 hull, MC hull no. 682; IMO number: 8332849
- Honors and awards: American Campaign Medal, European-African-Middle Eastern Campaign Medal, Asiatic-Pacific Campaign Medal, World War II Victory Medal, Navy Occupation Service Medal (with Asia clasp), National Defense Service Medal, Korean Service Medal (w/3 Battle Stars), United Nations Service Medal, Republic of Korea War Service Medal
- Renamed: USAT Admiral C. F. Hughes, 3 May 1946
- Renamed: USAT General Edwin D. Patrick, 30 August 1946
- Namesake: General Edwin D. Patrick, USA
- Renamed: USNS General Edwin D. Patrick (T-AP-124), 1 March 1950
- Out of service: 30 September 1968
- Stricken: 9 October 1969
- Fate: Sold for scrapping at ESCO Marine, Brownsville, Texas, 18 March 2010

General characteristics
- Class & type: Admiral W. S. Benson-class transport
- Displacement: 9,676 tons dockside 20,120 tons fully laden
- Length: 608 feet 11 inches (185.60 m)
- Beam: 75 feet 6 inches (23.01 m)
- Draft: 26 feet 6 inches (8.08 m)
- Installed power: 19,000 shp
- Propulsion: turbo-electric transmission, twin screw
- Speed: 19 knots (35 km/h)
- Capacity: 100,000 cubic feet (2,800 m^{3}) of cargo
- Troops: officers – 67; enlisted – 5,150
- Complement: officers – 32; enlisted – 324
- Armament: 4 × 5"/38 caliber gun mounts; 8 × twin Bofors 40 mm gun mounts; 14 × twin Oerlikon 20 mm cannon gun mounts

USS Admiral C. F. Hughes (AP-124) was an Admiral W. S. Benson-class transport named in honor of Charles Frederick Hughes, an admiral in the United States Navy who served as Chief of Naval Operations from 1927 to 1930. It was later renamed the ship USAT General Edwin D. Patrick after Edwin D. Patrick, an Army general who died in World War II.

Admiral C. F. Hughes was laid down on 29 November 1943 by the Bethlehem-Alameda Shipyard Inc., in Alameda, California, under contract with the United States Maritime Commission. She was launched on 27 August 1944 under the sponsorship of Mrs. Louisa Nimitz, the daughter of Admiral Hughes, the wife of Captain Otto Nimitz and the sister-in-law of Admiral Chester W. Nimitz. On 31 January 1945 she was delivered to the United States Navy and commissioned.

== Service history ==
=== World War II ===
Following brief sea trials, along the West Coast of the United States, Admiral C. F. Hughes embarked naval officers and Marines at San Diego for transportation to Hawaii. She departed San Diego on 13 March and arrived in Pearl Harbor on 18 March. There, she took on another group of passengers bound for the United States and then got underway on 23 March. The transport arrived in San Francisco on 28 March, disembarked her passengers, and then set sail for San Diego on 9 April. Admiral C. F. Hughes reached her destination the following day and began taking on more travelers. On the 14th, the transport left San Diego and set a westward course. The ship entered Pearl Harbor on the 19th, and some passengers left her while others came on board. Three days later, she put to sea on her way to the Mariana Islands. Admiral C. F. Hughes put in at Guam on 30 April, and all her passengers disembarked. After taking another group on board, including 221 Japanese prisoners of war, she stood out of Apra Harbor on 3 May. The transport made a two-day stop at Pearl Harbor from 10 to 12 May to disembark the prisoners and then continued her voyage back to the West Coast. She moored at San Francisco on 17 May.

On 26 May 1945 the transport sailed for Europe to embarked troops from the European Theater of Operations for redeployment to the Pacific. The transport retraced her route through the Panama Canal and reached Manila on 20 July. Admiral C. F. Hughes embarked troops at Biak in the Schouten Islands, and Hollandia, New Guinea, before leaving the latter port on 4 August to return to the United States. She delivered the returning servicemen at San Francisco on 17 August.

=== 1945–1967 ===
The ship put to sea on 31 August with replacements for western Pacific garrisons. Steaming via Ulithi, she arrived at Tacloban, Leyte on 17 September. Admiral C. F. Hughes visited Manila again before heading back to North America on the 24th. She paused at Victoria, British Columbia, Canada on 9 October to repatriate former prisoners of war from various Commonwealth Nations, and arrived at Seattle, Washington later that day. The transport made one more round-trip voyage to Yokohama before being decommissioned on 3 May 1946 and struck from the Navy list in June.

==== US Army Transport Service ====
After being decommissioned from the navy, Admiral C. F. Hughes was returned to the War Shipping Administration which, in turn, transferred her to the United States Army for operation with the Army Transport Service. The Army renamed the ship USAT General Edwin D. Patrick after Edwin D. Patrick, a general who was killed in action while commanding the 6th Infantry Division in the Philippines in 1945. Under the army, she served in the Army Transport Service from 30 August 1946 until 1 March 1950, when the navy reacquired her.

==== Military Sea Transportation Service ====
Retaining her army name, she was assigned to the Military Sea Transportation Service (MSTS) and was crewed by the civil service. Operating out of San Francisco, USNS General Edwin D. Patrick (T-AP-124) spent almost two decades transporting troops, military dependents, and cargo to American bases throughout the western Pacific, and supported American forces in the Korean and Vietnam Wars.

== Reserve Fleet ==
Early in 1967, the transport was placed in a ready reserve status. On 30 September 1968, the ship was laid up at the Maritime Administration's National Defense Reserve Fleet facility at Suisun Bay, Calif. On 31 August 1969, title to the ship was transferred to the Maritime Administration and was, again, struck from the Naval Register 9 October 1969. After being sold to ESCO Marine on 18 March 2010, the General Edwin D. Patrick, ex-Admiral C. F. Hughes, departed the San Francisco Bay under tow to the breakers on 3 May 2010. Her scrapping was declared complete on 25 January 2011.
