= Edwin D. Patrick =

United States Army general (1894–1945)

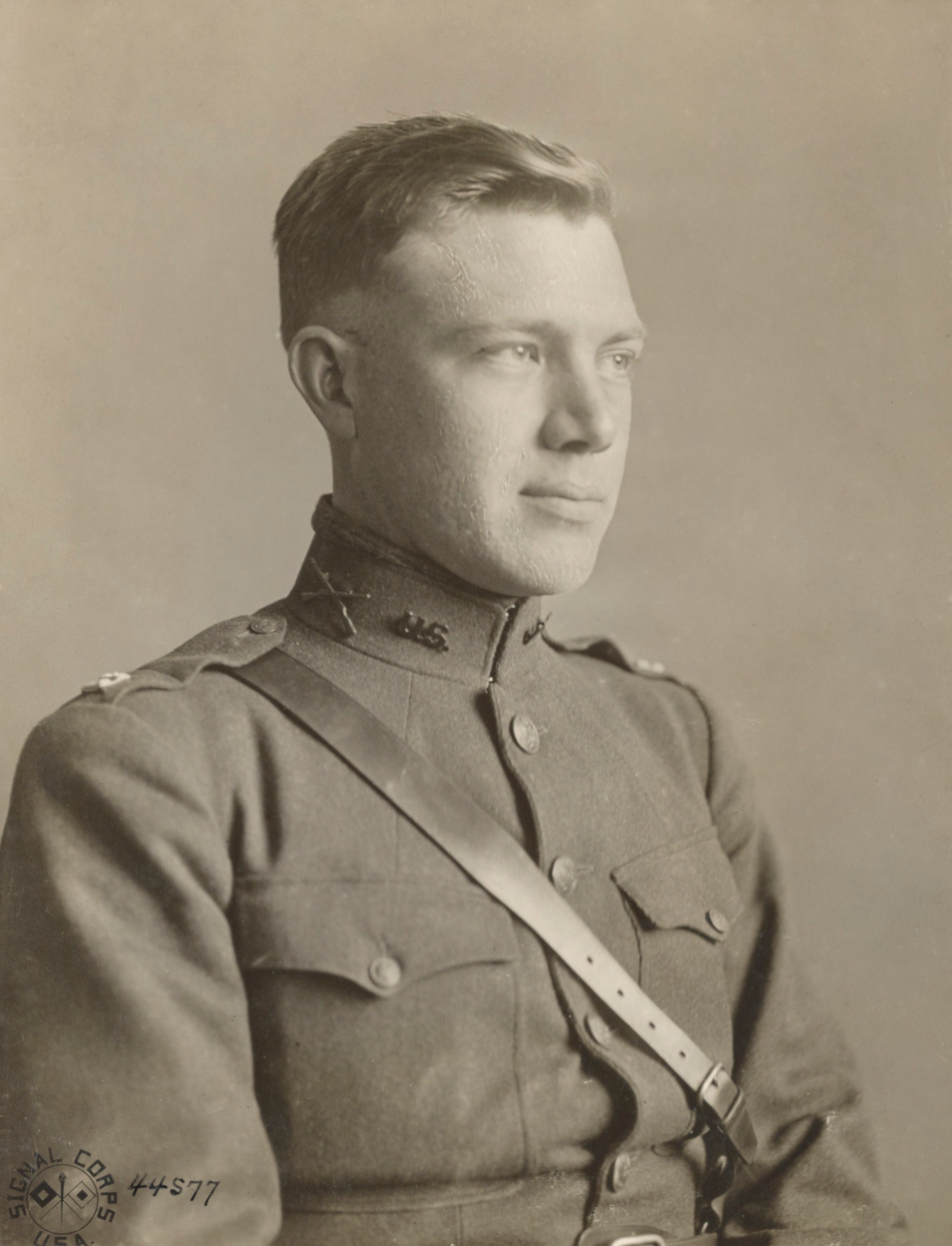
- Edwin D. Patrick, pictured here in December 1918 as a captain.
- Born: January 11, 1894; Tell City, Indiana, United States
- Died: March 15, 1945 (aged 51) near Montalban (now. Rodriguez), Rizal, Luzon Island, Commonwealth of the Philippines
- Burial place: Greenwood Cemetery, Tell City Indiana
- Military career
- Allegiance: United States
- Branch: United States Army
- Service years: 1915-1945
- Rank: Major General
- Service number: 0-4903
- Unit: Infantry Branch
- Commands: 357th Infantry Regiment; 6th Infantry Division
- Conflicts: World War I: Battle of Saint-Mihiel; Meuse–Argonne offensive; World War II: Battle of Wakde; Battle of Noemfoor; Battle of Wawa Dam †
- Awards: Distinguished Service Cross; Army Distinguished Service Medal; Purple Heart

Edwin Davies Patrick (January 11, 1894 – March 15, 1945) was a major general in the United States Army who commanded the 6th Infantry Division during World War II. He was killed in action during the Battle of Wawa Dam.

== Biography ==
He was born January 11, 1894, in Tell City Perry County, Indiana, was the son of John Thomas Patrick and Anna Elnore Menninger, sister of Carl Frederick Menninger, founder of the Menninger Clinic. Patrick was raised in Tell City, Indiana, and was commissioned a 2nd Lieutenant in the Indiana National Guard in 1915, following his graduation from college.

With the US intervention in World War I Patrick joined the 14th Machine Gun Battalion of the 5th Division and fought in France with the American Expeditionary Forces in the Saint-Mihiel and Meuse-Argonne offensives. For heroism during the war, Patrick received a Silver Star Citation, which was converted to the Silver Star when the decoration was established in 1932.

== World War II ==
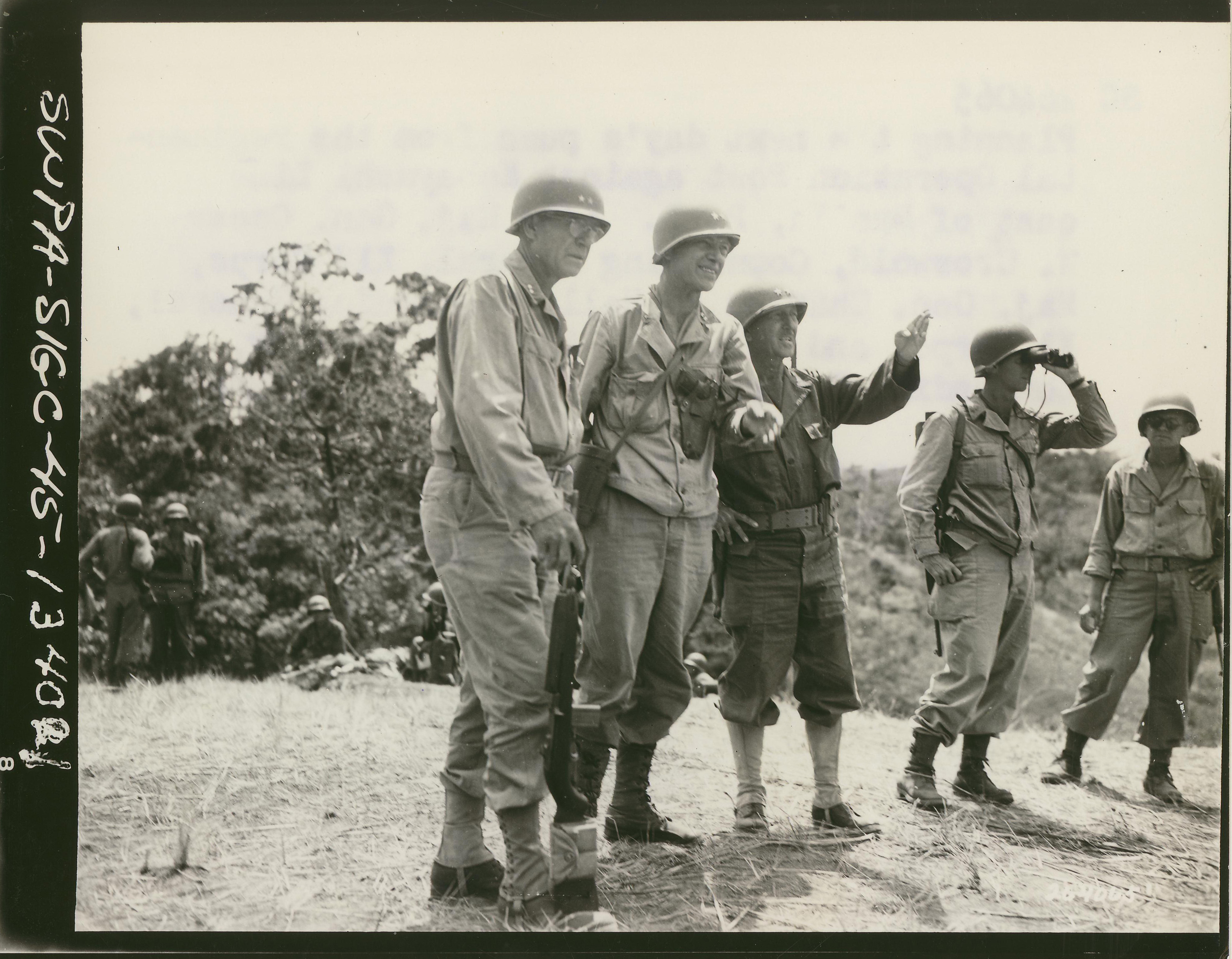
Major General Edwin D. Patrick (center), Major General Oscar Griswold (left) and Major General Charles P. Hall (right, pointing) on March 13, 1945.

During World War II, Patrick served on the staff of Admiral William Halsey for a brief period and then became chief of staff of general Walter Krueger's 6th Army. He was the commander of the task forces in the battles of Wakde and Noemfoor. Afterwards, he was given command of the 6th Infantry Division.

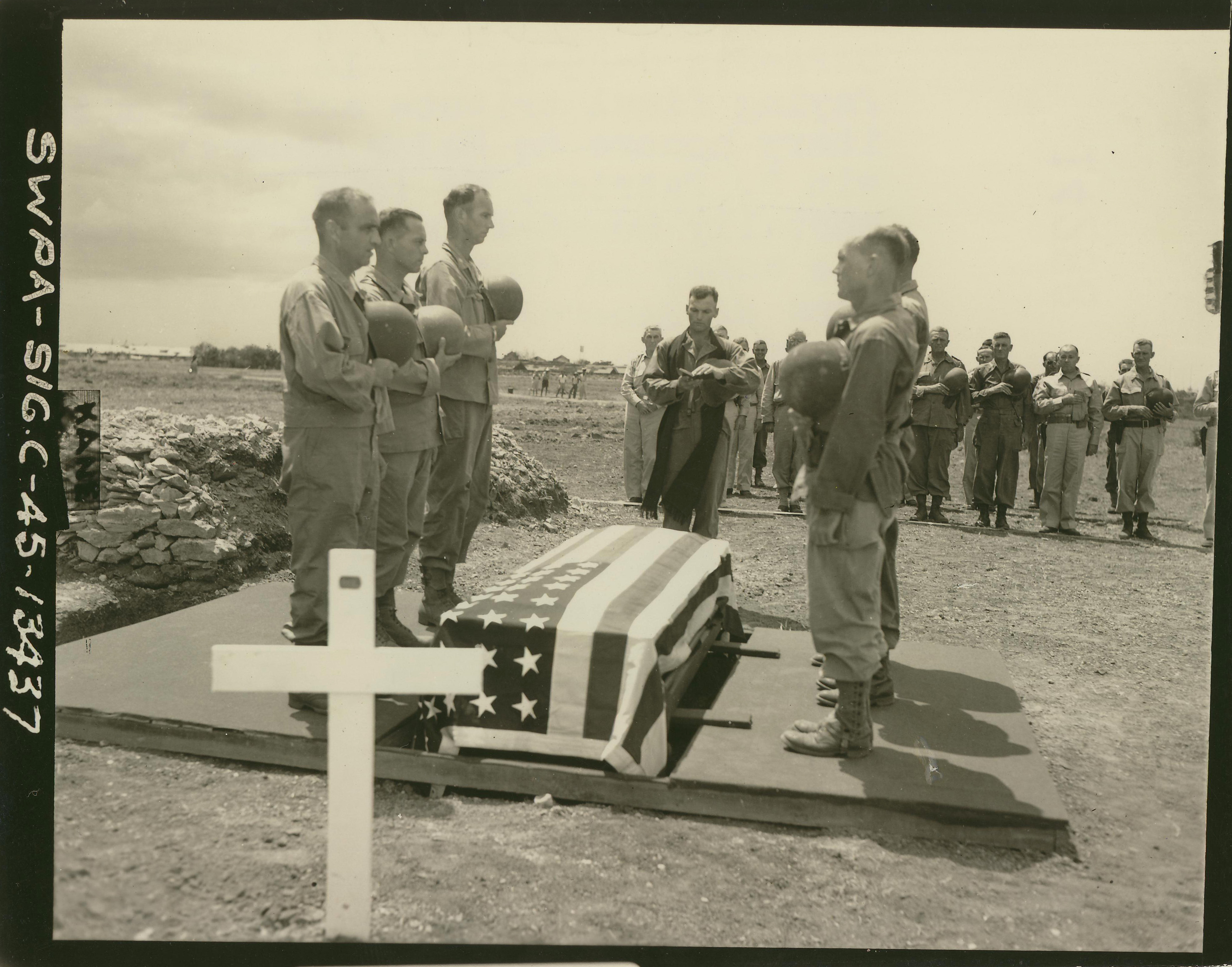
Funeral service for Major General Edwin D. Patrick.

During the Philippines campaign of 1944-45 Patrick was inspecting troops near Mount Mataba, south of Montalban, east of Manila on March 14. A Japanese soldier, who had remained in hiding behind American lines, opened fire from 75 yd (69 m) with a machine gun, mortally wounding Patrick, who died the next day.

General Patrick was buried in the Manila American Cemetery on 26 November 1945.

Edwin Patrick was one of only three American division commanders to die in combat action in World War II. The other two were Maurice Rose and James Edward Wharton. Patrick was posthumously awarded the Distinguished Service Cross and the Distinguished Service Medal.

== Legacy ==
A Navy transport ship, USNS General Edwin D. Patrick (T-AP-124), was named in his honor.

== Awards ==
- Distinguished Service Cross
- Distinguished Service Medal
- Silver Star
- Purple Heart
- Meritorious Unit Commendation
- World War I Victory Medal
- American Defense Service Medal
- American Campaign Medal
- Asiatic-Pacific Campaign Medal with two campaign stars
- World War II Victory Medal
- Philippine Presidential Unit Citation
- Philippine Liberation Medal with two stars

== Dates or rank ==
- 2nd Lieutenant, Indiana National Guard - 11 February 1915
- 2nd Lieutenant, Regular Army - 21 March 1917 (accepted 25 March 1917)
- 1st Lieutenant, Regular Army - 15 April 1917
- Captain (temporary) - 5 August 1917
- Captain, Regular Army - 11 December 1917
- Major, Regular Army - 11 December 1929
- Lieutenant Colonel, Regular Army - 12 June 1939
- Colonel, Army of the United States - 14 October 1941 (accepted 18 October 1941)
- Brigadier General, Army of the United States - 26 April 1943
- Major General, Army of the United States - 5 September 1944

== Bibliography ==
- Heefner, Wilson Allen (1995). Twentieth Century Warrior: The Life and Service of Major General Edwin D. Patrick. White Mane Publishing Company. ISBN 978-1550023.

Military offices
| Preceded by Franklin C. Sibert | Commanding General 6th Infantry Division; 1944–1945 | Succeeded by Charles E. Hurdis |
