= Samuel E. Ebbesen =

American Army general (born 1938)

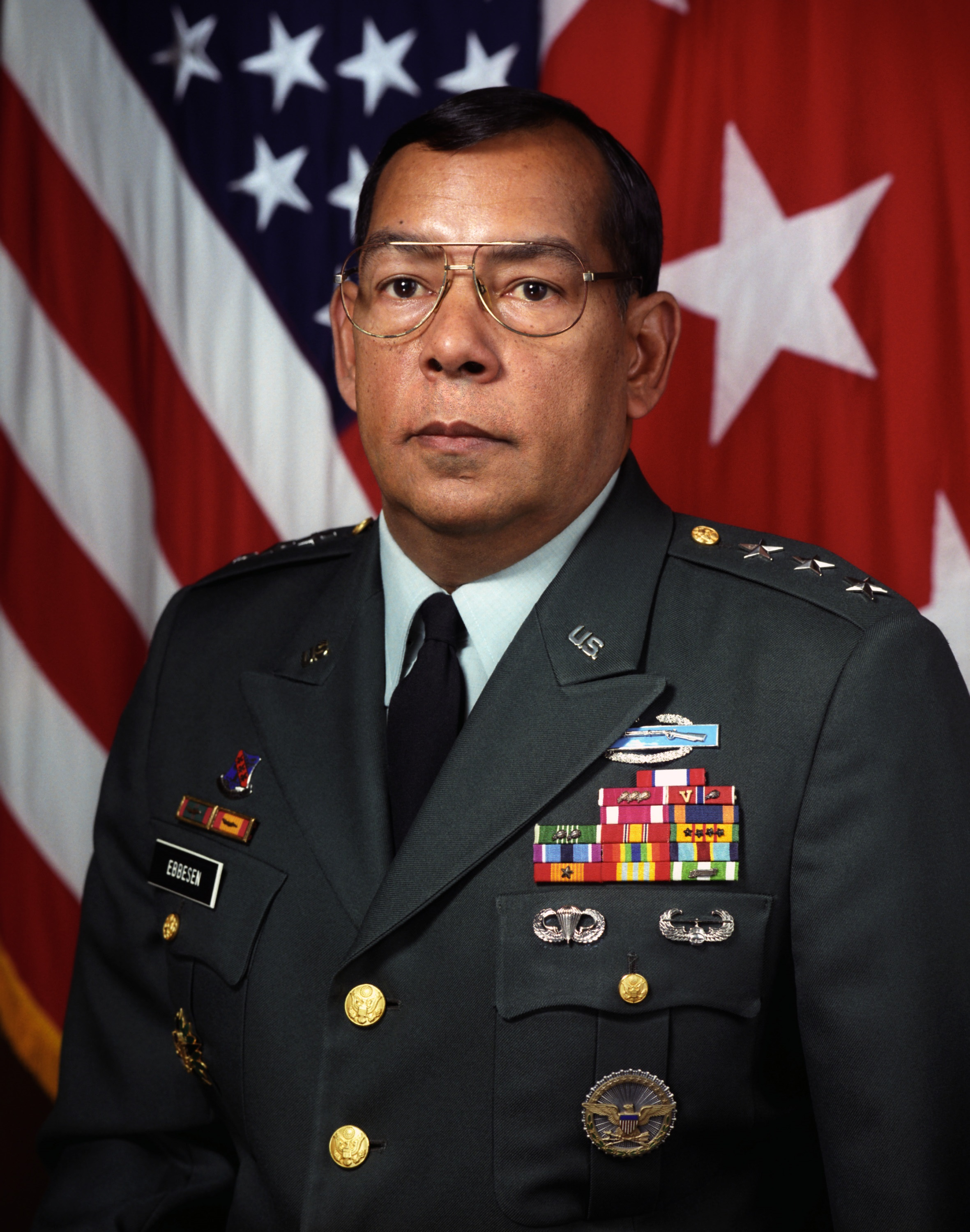
- Ebbesen in 1996
- Born: 15 September 1938 (age 88); Saint Croix, U.S. Virgin Islands
- Military career
- Allegiance: United States
- Branch: United States Army
- Service years: 1961–1997
- Rank: Lieutenant General
- Commands: Second United States Army; 6th Infantry Division; 1st Brigade, 101st Airborne Division; 2nd Battalion, 32nd Infantry Regiment
- Conflicts: Vietnam War
- Awards: Defense Distinguished Service Medal; Army Distinguished Service Medal; Legion of Merit (4); Bronze Star Medal (2); Meritorious Service Medal; Air Medal

Samuel Emanuel Ebbesen (born 15 September 1938) is a lieutenant general in the United States Army who served as Deputy Assistant Secretary of Defense for Military Personnel Policy.

== Early life and education ==
Born in the United States Virgin Islands, Ebbesen attended the City College of New York and graduated in 1961 with a B.A. degree in political science. He was commissioned through the Army ROTC program. Ebbesen later earned a master's degree in public administration from Auburn University.

== Military career ==
During the Vietnam War, Ebbesen was sent to South Vietnam as a military advisor in 1966 and as a district senior advisor in 1970. As a lieutenant colonel, he served as commanding officer of the 2nd Battalion, 32nd Infantry, 7th Infantry Division at Fort Ord, California. Promoted to colonel in September 1982, Ebbesen commanded the 1st Brigade, 101st Airborne Division (Air Assault) at Fort Campbell, Kentucky from 1983 to 1985. His promotion to brigadier general was approved in October 1986.

As a major general, Ebbesen commanded the 6th Infantry Division (Light) and Army Forces Alaska from April 1990 to July 1992 at Fort Wainwright. As a lieutenant general, he served as commanding officer of the Second United States Army from July 1992 to December 1994 at Fort Gillem, Georgia. On 25 August 1992, Ebbesen deployed to Tallahassee, Florida to coordinate military support in the aftermath of Hurricane Andrew.

In October 1994, Ebbesen was reappointed to the rank of lieutenant general so that he could serve at the Pentagon as the Deputy Assistant Secretary of Defense for Military Personnel Policy. He retired from active duty in January 1997.

== Later career ==
In November 2002, Ebbesen's appointment by President George W. Bush to serve on the board of directors of the Overseas Private Investment Corporation was approved by the U.S. Senate. He served on the board from 29 January 2003 through 2 November 2011.
