= David A. Bramlett =

United States Army general

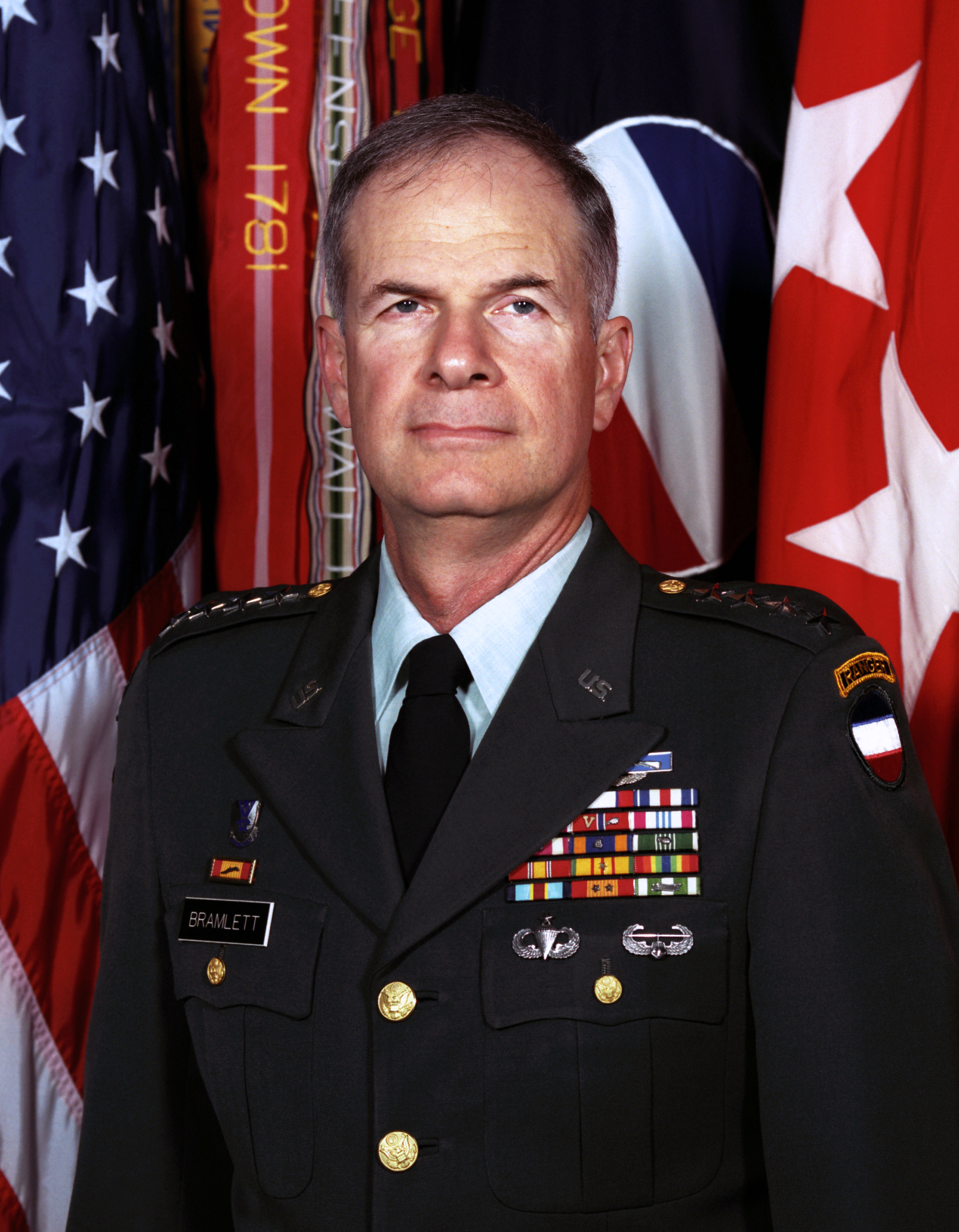
- General David A. Bramlett
- Born: 29 June 1941 (age 85); Galesburg, Illinois, U.S.
- Military career
- Allegiance: United States
- Branch: United States Army
- Service years: 1964–1998
- Rank: General
- Commands: United States Army Forces Command; 6th Infantry Division; 3rd Brigade, 101st Airborne Division (Air Assault); 1st Brigade, 82nd Airborne Division; 1st Battalion, 503rd Infantry Regiment
- Conflicts: Vietnam War
- Awards: Defense Distinguished Service Medal; Army Distinguished Service Medal (2); Silver Star; Legion of Merit; Bronze Star Medal (6)
- Other work: Vice President, Hawaii Army Museum SOciety

David Anthony Bramlett (born 29 June 1941) is a retired United States Army four-star general who commanded United States Army Forces Command from July 1996 to August 1998, after serving as Deputy Commander in Chief and Chief of Staff, United States Pacific Command at Camp H. M. Smith, Hawaii. During his tenure as Deputy Commander, he was the interim commander of Pacific Command after the commander, Admiral Richard C. Macke, came under fire for comments he had made in regard to the 1995 rape scandal in Okinawa that involved three United States servicemen.

== Military career ==
Entering the United States Army from Imperial Beach, California, Bramlett graduated from the United States Military Academy in 1964 and was commissioned a second lieutenant of Infantry. His first assignment was as a platoon leader in Company B, 1st Battalion, 14th Infantry Regiment, 25th Infantry Division, Hawaii.

Bramlett served in South Vietnam from December 1965 to November 1966, as aide-de-camp for the Assistant Division Commander, 25th Infantry Division, and later company executive officer, C/1-14 Infantry. His second tour, from September 1968 to August 1969, included rifle company command of C/2-327th Infantry, 101st Airborne Division and assistant brigade S-3, 1st Brigade.

Bramlett's numerous command and staff positions include commander, 1st Battalion, 503rd Infantry, 3rd Brigade, 101st Airborne Division (Air Assault), Fort Campbell, Kentucky; commander, 1st Brigade, 82nd Airborne Division, Fort Bragg, North Carolina; commander, 3rd Brigade, 101st Airborne Division (Air Assault); and as Commanding General, 6th Infantry Division (Light), Fort Wainwright, Alaska. He also served as Assistant Chief of Staff, G-1, 101st Airborne Division; and as Assistant Chief of Staff, G-3/Director Plans and Training, XVIII Airborne Corps, Fort Bragg.

Bramlett's career also includes tours of duty as deputy director, Plans, Policy and Programs Directorate, United States Central Command, MacDill Air Force Base, Florida and Assistant Division Commander, 25th Infantry Division, Hawaii. Prior to assuming command of the 6th Infantry Division (Light), he was Commandant of Cadets, United States Military Academy, West Point, New York, from 1989 to 1992.

Bramlett's instructor tours include the Florida Ranger Camp, 1967–68, and the Department of English at West Point for three years after earning a master's degree from Duke University in 1972. He attended the Advanced Course at the United States Army Armor School, the Command and General Staff College, and the Army War College.

== Awards and decorations ==
Bramlett's military awards include the Defense Distinguished Service Medal, the Army Distinguished Service Medal with oak leaf cluster, Silver Star, Legion of Merit, Bronze Star Medal with "V" device with five oak leaf clusters, and the Defense Meritorious Service Medal. He also wears the Combat Infantryman Badge, Senior Parachutist Badge, Air Assault Badge, and Ranger Tab.

== Relations ==
Bramlett is the son of Jayne E. Bramlett and the Robert H. Bramlett, USN (retired), of National City, California. He is married to the former Judith Ann Cassidy. They have one son, Robert.

== Post-military career ==
After retiring from the military, Bramlett became the vice president of the Hawaii Army Museum Society. He also currently serves as an adjunct professor at Hawaii Pacific University, teaching graduate seminars in U.S. Military History, the American Way of War and War Literature.
