= Battle of Ben Het =

Part of the Vietnam War (1969)

- Part of the Vietnam War
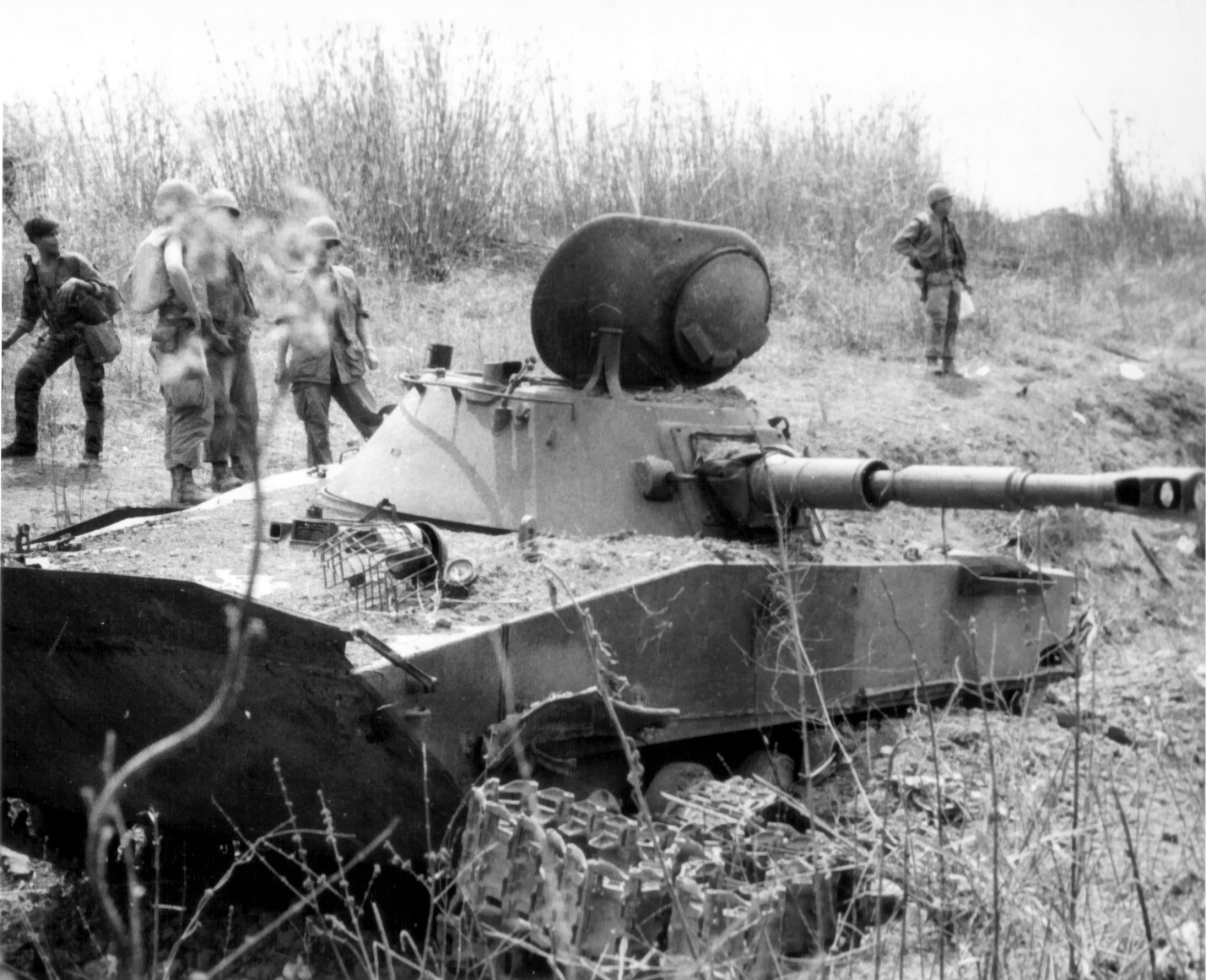
- One of two destroyed PT-76 tanks
Date	March 3–4, 1969
Location	Ben Het Camp, South Vietnam
Result	United States victory

Belligerents
United States; South Vietnam	North Vietnam

Commanders and leaders
(United States) Captain John Stovall (WIA)	Unknown

Units involved
(United States) Company B, 1st Battalion, 69th Armor Regiment (United States) 5th Special Forces Group (South Vietnam) CIDG (United States) 4th Infantry Division Artillery	16th Company, 4th Battalion, 202nd Armored Regiment

Strength
(United States) 4 M48 tanks 2 M42A1 tanks 1 175mm artillery battery 1 AC-47; 12 Green Berets (South Vietnam) 400 CIDG	10 PT-76 tanks Unknown number of BTR-50s

Casualties and losses
(United States) 1 M48A3 tank lightly damaged 2 killed 2 wounded (South Vietnam) 1 killed 6 wounded	2 PT-76 tanks destroyed 1 BTR-50PK destroyed Unknown; no bodies found

The Battle of Ben Het was a North Vietnamese armored assault on the Ben Het Special Forces Camp. It was the only tank battle between the United States and North Vietnam during the Vietnam War.

== Background ==
The Ben Het Camp Special Forces Camp was located along the Vietnam-Laos-Cambodia tri-border area and run by the 5th Special Forces Group. At the time of the battle, there were 12 Green Beret advisers and three companies of CIDG numbering 400 in total, alongside two M42A1 tanks and a 175mm artillery battery.

In March 1969 one platoon of the 69th Armor Regiment's 1st Battalion, Company B under Captain John P. Stovall was stationed at Ben Het, equipped with M48 Patton tanks. Three of the four tanks took up dug-in positions on a hill facing west towards Cambodia, while the last tank occupied a firing position guarding the left flank overlooking the resupply route to the main camp.

After heavy enemy shelling in February where B Company received ten casualties, action decreased in early March. At 22:00 on March 2, Sergeant First Class Hugh H. Havermale reported to Stovall that his men could hear vehicular movement to the west of the camp. B Company heard the unidentified vehicles for roughly 20 minutes before they shut down.

== Battle ==
At 21:00 on March 3 the Ben Het camp came under recoilless rifle fire, and was shelled with heavy mortars and artillery between 21:30 and 22:00. Over the sound of artillery, Havermale and Staff Sergeant Jerry W. Jones again heard the sound of tracks and heavy engines from the west. The threat of enemy tanks sent B Company into action, and HEAT rounds were loaded while the area was scanned with infrared searchlights and night vision scopes. Suddenly an anti-tank mine exploded roughly 800–1,100 meters to the southwest, illuminating a PT-76 light tank of the 16th Company, 4th Battalion, 202nd Armored Regiment, which had detonated it, causing it to catch alight with fire which illuminated three other nearby tanks and a BTR-50 APC. Before the echo of the explosion had faded, the disabled tank fired a round that fell short of the defenders, and was followed in turn by the other vehicles, with at least seven other flashes being spotted. The first United States tanker to return fire was Specialist 4 Frank Hembree, who only had muzzle flashes to sight on, which proved to be enough; he hit and destroyed an enemy vehicle with his second round fired.

A CIDG patrol reported it was observing an 8–15-vehicle column moving east towards the camp from the border area, causing Stovall to call for illumination from the camp's mortar section, but the flares worked both ways and allowed the North Vietnamese to properly sight in the Americans. Stovall was climbing aboard Havermale's tank when the loaders hatch was hit with an HE round. Stovall and Havermale were blown from the tank and sprayed with shrapnel, while the driver (who had been manning an externally mounted machine gun) and loader were killed. The M48 was only lightly damaged, and was quickly put back into the fight with a new crew, while Jones took charge. Dismounting, Jones ran to another tank which was unable to fire on the main enemy from its position, and while under fire directed it to a new one. The tank sighted another vehicle next to the PT-76 which had been taken out by the mine and Specialist 4 Eddie Davis managed to destroy it by sighting the muzzle flashes.

The Americans had exhausted their HEAT supply and swapped to HE, when the North Vietnamese began withdrawing. An AC-47 'Spooky' gunship harassed the enemy as they withdrew. The battle was over.

== Aftermath ==
In the morning the battlefield was investigated, where the hulls of two PT-76s and one BTR-50PK were found. There were no enemy bodies. Bloody bandages, burned articles of clothing, a driver's helmet and a flamethrower were recovered. One CIDG was killed and four were wounded in the fight. It was reported the North Vietnamese had attacked the camp in order to destroy its 175mm self propelled guns.

== See also ==
- Battle of Lang Vei
