= 14th Field Artillery Regiment =

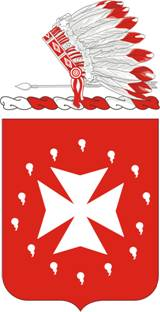
- Coat of arms
- Active: 1917–1921; 1922–1927; 1934–1936; 1942–1957; 1957–present (as parent regiment)
- Country: United States
- Branch: Army
- Type: Field artillery
- Motto: Ex Hoc Signo Victoria (Victory By This Sign)

Insignia
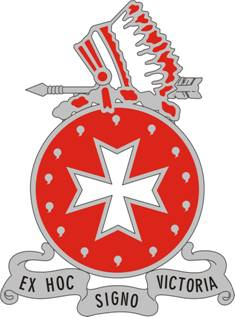
- Distinctive unit insignia

The 14th Field Artillery Regiment is a parent field artillery regiment of the United States Army, currently represented in the Regular Army by its 1st Battalion, a HIMARS unit with the 75th Field Artillery Brigade at Fort Sill, Oklahoma.

The regiment was first organized on 1 June 1917 in the Regular Army at Fort Sill, having been constituted almost a year earlier.

== History ==
The 14th Field Artillery was first constituted on 1 July 1916 in the Regular Army, and organized on 1 June 1917 at Fort Sill, Oklahoma during World War I. It was inactivated there on 1 September 1921 as the Regular Army was reduced in strength postwar.

On 15 December 1922, the regiment was assigned to the 6th Division, and its 1st Battalion activated at Fort Sheridan, Illinois. It was relieved from the 6th Division and assigned to the 7th Division on 7 September 1927, and its 1st Battalion consolidated with the 2nd Battalion, 3rd Field Artillery Regiment to become that unit. A new 1st Battalion was simultaneously constituted, though it was not activated until 1 December 1934 at Fort Riley, Kansas. The battalion inactivated there on 1 July 1936. On 16 October 1939, the regiment was relieved from its assignment to the 7th Division.

The regiment was assigned to the 2nd Armored Division on 15 July 1940 and activated at Fort Benning, Georgia on that day. It was reorganized and redesignated as the 14th Armored Field Artillery Battalion on 8 January 1942.

Relieved 1 April 1957 from assignment to the 2d Armored Division; concurrently reorganized and redesignated as the 14th Artillery, a parent regiment under the Combat Arms Regimental System

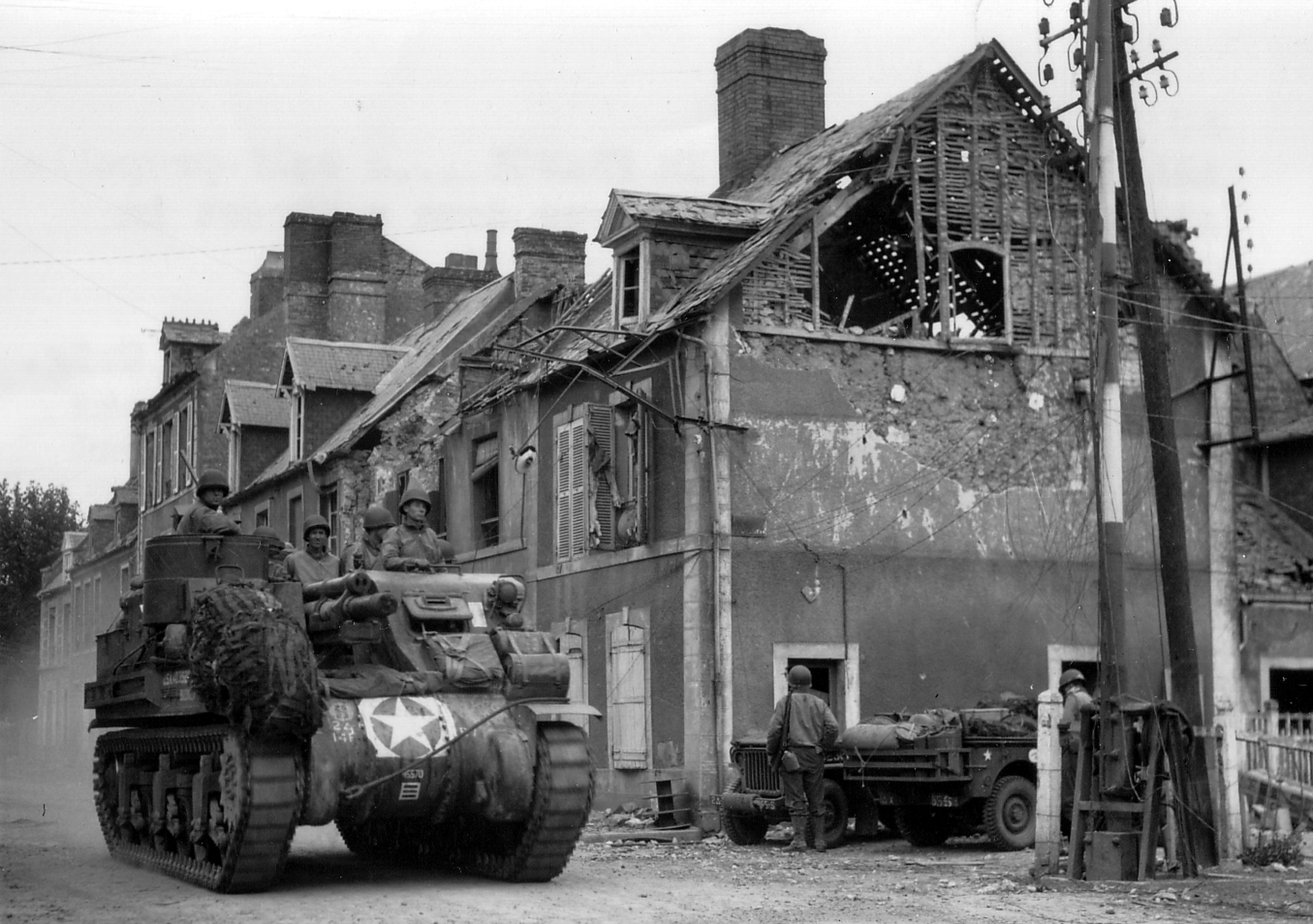
M7 Priest of the 14th Armored Field Artillery Battalion in Normandy

Redesignated 1 September 1971 as the 14th Field Artillery

Withdrawn 16 May 1988 from the Combat Arms Regimental System and allotted to the United States Army Regimental System.

== Heraldry ==
=== Distinctive unit insignia ===
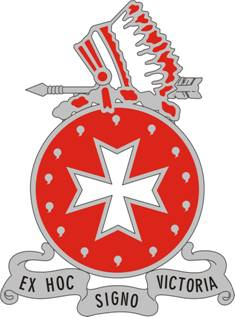
14th Field Artillery Distinctive Unit Insignia

The distinctive unit insignia was originally approved on 20 October 1923, and amended to correct the description and revise the symbolism on 7 November 1991. It is a silver color metal and enamel device 1 1/8 inches (2.9 cm) in height overall consisting of a red disc charged with a white Maltese cross within a ring of fourteen gouttes d’eau (silver) reversed; attached above is a wreath of the colors, silver and red, on which is a red and white American Indian war bonnet surmounting a silver arrow. Attached below, a silver triparted scroll inscribed "EX HOC SIGNO VICTORIA" in black letters which means Victory By This Sign.

On the distinctive unit insignia, the red represents Artillery units. The Maltese Cross, used by American Indians in Oklahoma, symbolizes the morning star, representing the organization of the regiment. The fourteen water drops correspond to its numerical designation, and their irregular placement represents a dried peyote, a sacred emblem of the Comanche and Kiowa. The war bonnet, pierced by an arrow of Satanta, a 19th-century Kiowa chief in the Fort Sill region, is a spear with a feathered end and leather grip.

=== Coat of arms ===
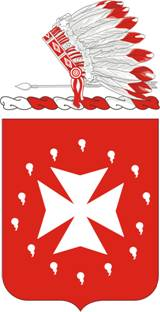
14th Field Artillery Coat of Arms

The coat of arms was approved on 24 February 1921, and amended to correct the blazon of the shield on 28 April 1923. It was again amended to correct the blazon of the shield and revise the symbolism on 7 November 1991.

The shield of the coat of arms includes Gules a broad armed Maltese cross with slightly reentrant ends Argent within fourteen gouttes d’eau reversed arranged in the outline of peyote (one of the cactus family, in outline approximating a circle). The crest is on a wreath of the colors, Argent and Gules, an American Indian war bonnet Gules and Argent over Satanta's arrow. The symbolism contained in the coat of arms is identical to that of the distinctive unit insignia.

== Current configuration ==
- 1st Battalion - currently with 75th Field Artillery Brigade.

== Campaign participation credit ==
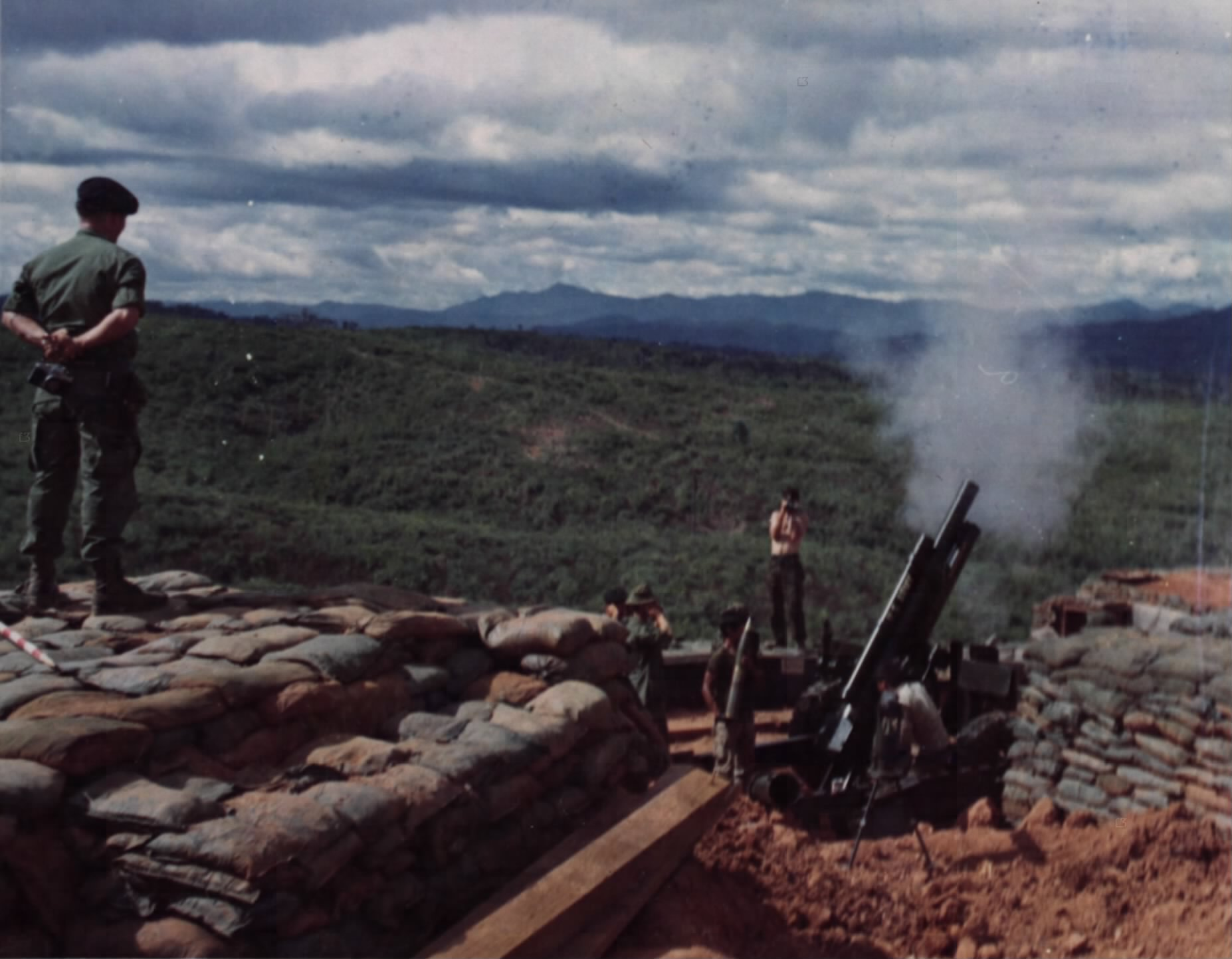
Members of 3rd Battery, 14th Artillery perform a fire mission at Ben Het Camp, 4 November 1969

World War II: Sicily (with arrowhead); Normandy; Northern France; Rhineland; Ardennes-Alsace; Central Europe

Vietnam: Defense; Counteroffensive; Counteroffensive, Phase II; Counteroffensive, Phase III; Tet Counteroffensive; Counteroffensive, Phase IV; Counteroffensive, Phase V; Counteroffensive, Phase VI; Tet 69/Counteroffensive; Summer-Fall 1969; Winter-Spring 1970; Sanctuary Counteroffensive; Counteroffensive, Phase VII; Consolidation I

== Decorations ==
Presidential Unit Citation (Army) for NORMANDY

Presidential Unit Citation (Army) for PLEIKU PROVINCE

Meritorious Unit Commendation (Army) for VIETNAM 1965–1967

Meritorious Unit Citation (Army) for UNITED ARAB EMIRATES 2013–2014

Belgian Fourragere 1940

Cited in the Order of the Day of the Belgian Army for action in the ARDENNES

Cited in the Order of the Day of the Belgian Army for action in BELGIUM
