= Ben Het Camp =

Former US Army camp in Vietnam

Ben Het Camp (Ben Het Airfield)
- Kon Tum, Central Highlands in Vietnam
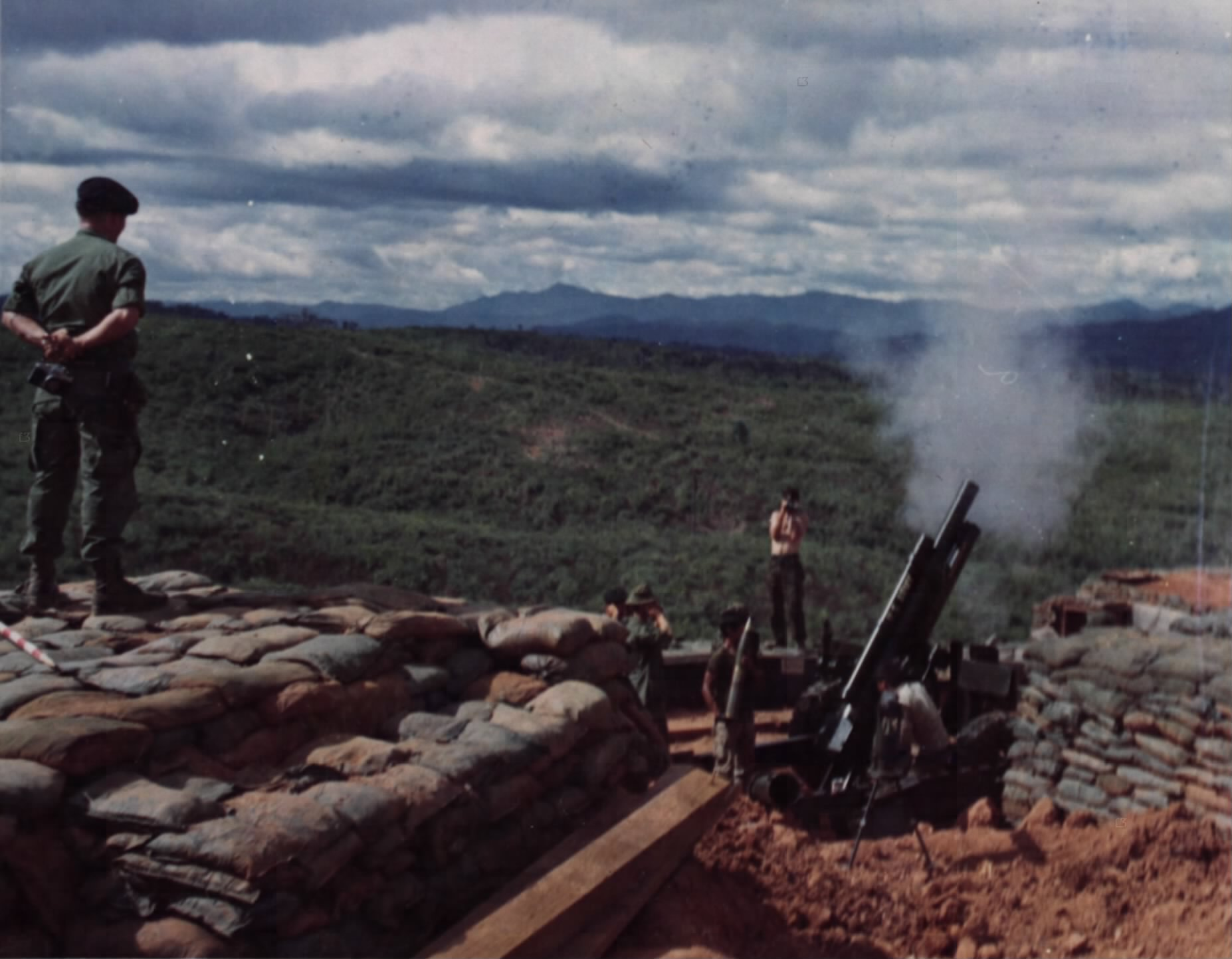
- CO of Team A-244, watches as members of 3rd Battery, 14th Artillery perform a fire mission, 4 November 1969

Site information
- Type: Army Base
- Operator: Army of the Republic of Vietnam (ARVN); United States Army (U.S. Army)
- Condition: Abandoned

Location
- Shown within Vietnam
- Coordinates: 14°41′19″N 107°39′40″E

Site history
- Built: 1966
- Built by: Company C, 299th Engineer Battalion
- In use: 1966-1973
- Battles/wars: Vietnam War; Battle of Ben Het; Battle of Kontum

Garrison information
- Garrison: 5th Special Forces Group; 85th Border Rangers; 22nd Division

Airfield information
- Elevation: 2,198 feet (670 m) AMSL
Runways
Direction	Length and surface
13/31	1,500 feet (457 m) M8A1 SSP

Ben Het Camp (also known as Ben Het Special Forces Camp, Ben Het SF/CIDG Camp, Ben Het Ranger Camp, FSB Ben Het and Firebase 12) is a former U.S. Army and Army of the Republic of Vietnam (ARVN) base in western Kon Tum Province in the Central Highlands of Vietnam. The camp was notable for being the site of a tank battle between the U.S. Army and the People's Army of Vietnam (PAVN), one of the few such encounters during the Vietnam War.

== History ==
=== 1966-73 ===
The 5th Special Forces Group Detachment A-244 first established a base at Ben Het, then a hill tribe village, in the early 1960s to monitor North Vietnamese infiltration along the Ho Chi Minh Trail. The base was located approximately 13 km from the Vietnam-Laos-Cambodia tri-border area, 15 km northwest of Đắk Tô and 53 km northwest of Kon Tum.

On 29 August 1967, in preparation for the construction of an airfield west of Dak To, Co C, 299th Engineer Battalion (Combat) and the 15th Engineer Company (LE) (-) moved from Pleiku to old Dak To Airfield.

On 22 October 1967, Company C, 299th Engineer Battalion moved to the Ben Het area to build a proposed basecamp with a firebase complex and a Type II, C-7 capable airfield with provision for expansion to accommodate C-130s.

On 3 November, the 4th Battalion, 503d Infantry, 173rd Airborne Brigade was moved to Ben Het. On 6 November Company C engineers began providing direct support to the 503rd colocated with them. Bulldozer support was provided on the average of one per day to excavate defensive positions, living bunkers, a tactical operations center and 8" and 155mm gun positions. C Company later improved Route 512 from Đắk Tô Base Camp to Ben Het and maintained the C-130 airstrip at Dak To 2. Company C finished the basecamp on 31 January 1968. The requirement to upgrade the Ben Het airfield to a C-130 capacity was rescinded by MACV in December, 1967. The engineers left Ben Het and returned to their home base in Pleiku on 3 Feb 1968, as the Tet Offensive came to a close, and undertook projects in the area.

In November 1968, a helicopter pilot from the 7th Squadron, 17th Cavalry Regiment reported four unidentified tanks west of the camp, but the report was never confirmed. The U.S. 4th Infantry Division had other reports of PAVN tanks in the area.

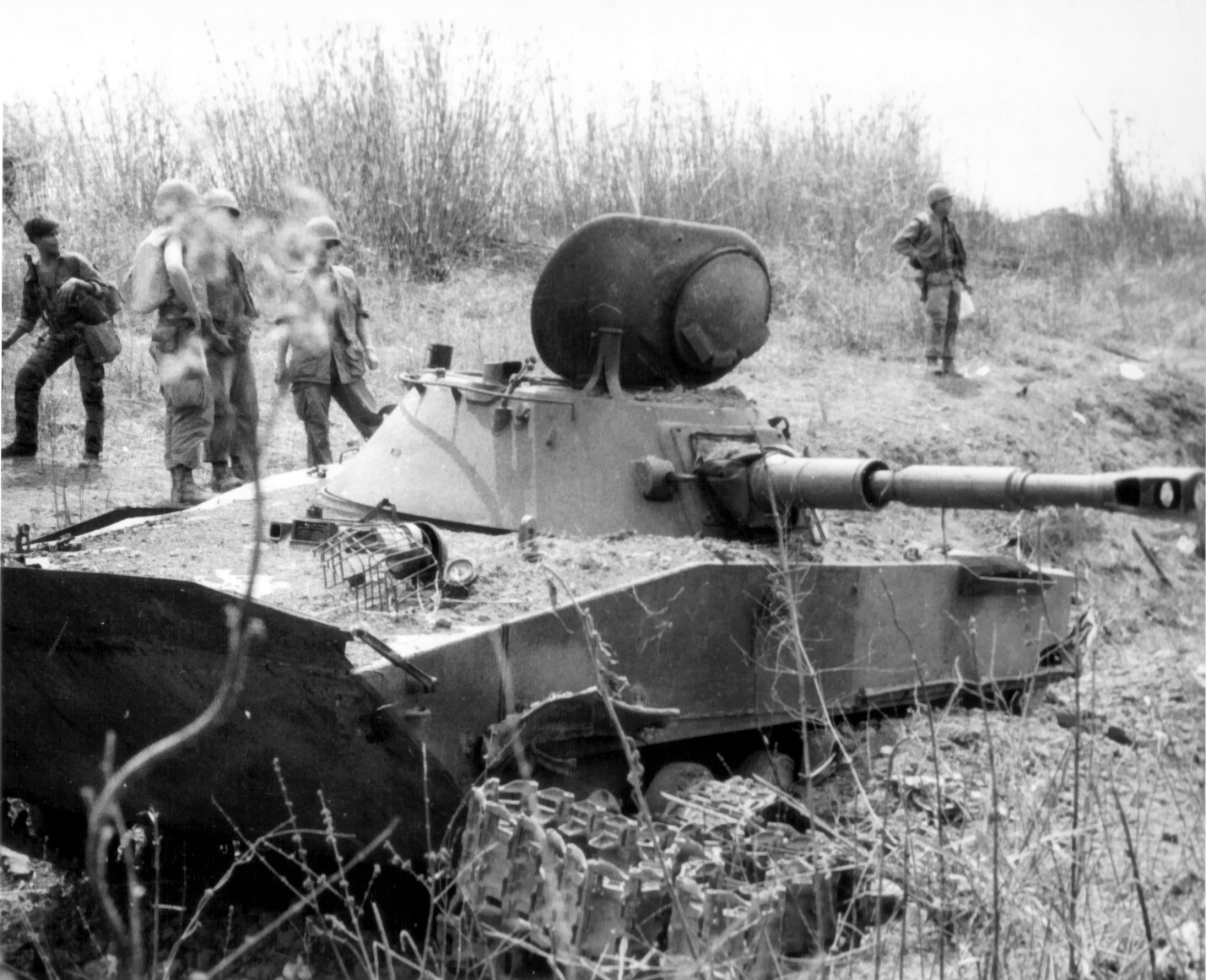
One of two PT-76s from the PAVN 202nd Armored Regiment, destroyed by U.S. M48 Pattons from the 1/69th Armor on 3 March 1969

By early 1969, there were about 440 Civilian Irregular Defense Group (CIDG) personnel, 511 ARVN soldiers, 207 Artillery troops and 25 US Advisors at Ben Het. Free world forces at Ben Het included three Vietnamese infantry companies and their Special Forces advisers, two M42A1 Duster self-propelled anti-aircraft guns and an artillery battery of M107 self-propelled guns. To counter a buildup of PAVN forces in the area, a unit of the 1st Battalion, 69th Armor Regiment, equipped with four M48 Patton tanks was sent to reinforce the camp. Three of the four tanks took up dug-in positions on a hill facing west towards Cambodia, while the last tank occupied a firing position in the main camp overlooking the resupply route.

Throughout February the PAVN attacked the camp by fire. The shelling decreased at the beginning of March, but at 21:00 on 3 March the PAVN shelling began again and men of the 1/69th Armor heard the sound of tank engines coming from the west. A PT-76 of the PAVN 16th Company, 4th Battalion, 202nd Armored Regiment detonated an antitank mine 1,100 meters to the southwest of the base, which alerted the camp and lit up the other PT-76s attacking the base. Flares were sent up, exposing the attacking tanks, but by sighting in on muzzle flashes, one PT-76 scored a direct hit on the turret of an M48, killing two crewmen and wounding the other two. Another M48, using the same technique, destroyed a PT-76 with their second shot. At daybreak, the battlefield revealed the wreckage of two PT-76s and one BTR-50 armored personnel carrier but no PAVN dead. Intelligence later revealed that the main object of the attack was to destroy the M107 guns.

The VC/PAVN initially deployed the 28th and 66th Infantry Regiments, supported by the 40th Artillery Regiment, in semicircular fashion to the south of Highway 512 in preparation for the assault. "Prisoner Duong Than Ban... stated that he was in the B-3 Front Headquarters area in Cambodia (Base Area 609) when the 28th Regiment returned from the May-June 1969 battle near the Ben Het SF Camp. He said that the regiment had been hit by a series of B-52 strikes in the immediate vicinity of the Ben Het camp, then had been hit by another series of B-52 strikes as they pulled back to their base area in Cambodia. These strikes caused major damage to the regiment. There were only two companies (200 men) left of more than 1,000 men that had entered the battle area".

On 24 May 1969, the PAVN ambushed the 212th Company of the 1st Mobile Strike Force Battalion near Ben Het. Warrant Officer Class Two Keith Payne of the Australian Army Training Team Vietnam was awarded the Victoria Cross for his actions that day.

Other units stationed at Ben Het included:

- 6th Battalion, 14th Artillery

=== 1972 ===
Following the departure of the U.S. forces the base was used by the ARVN 85th Border Rangers.

Since January 1972 it had become clear that the North Vietnamese were building up for offensive operations in the tri-border region. ARVN forces had been deployed forward toward the border in order to slow the PAVN advance and allow the application of airpower to deplete PAVN manpower and logistics. To counter the possible threat from the west, two regiments of the ARVN 22nd Division were deployed to Tân Cảnh and Đắk Tô and the 1st Squadron, 19th Armored Cavalry Regiment equipped with M41 tanks was deployed to Ben Het. On 24 April, the PAVN 2nd Division, elements of the 203rd Tank Regiment and several independent regiments of the B-3 Front attacked Tân Cảnh and Đắk Tô rapidly overrunning both bases with their T-54 tanks. On 9 May 1972, elements of the PAVN 203rd Armored Regiment assaulted Ben Het. ARVN Rangers destroyed the first three PT-76 tanks with BGM-71 TOW missiles, thereby breaking up the attack. The Rangers spent the rest of the day stabilising the perimeter ultimately destroying 11 tanks and killing over 100 PAVN.

In early October 1972 the PAVN 320th Division focused attacks on the base, culminating on 12 October in a bombardment of some 1,500 rounds of artillery, rockets and mortars striking in and around the camp that destroyed the defenders' artillery, significant ammunition reserves and food supplies. PAVN ground assaults followed and the 300-man garrison reported initial casualties of 60 dead and 120 wounded. Over 100 airstrikes by fighter-bombers and B-52 bombers failed to stop the attacks and radio contact was lost with the defenders on the night of 12 October 1972. Approximately 140 survivors escaped the camp and evaded to the southwest, being observed by friendly aircraft the morning of 13 October. Airstrikes were employed to destroy equipment in the abandoned base. Prior to the bombardment, two American advisors were evacuated.

== Current use ==
The base has been returned to farmland and housing.
