= 6th Infantry Division (United States) =

Inactive US Army formation

- 6th Infantry Division shoulder sleeve insignia
- Active: 16 November 1917–30 September 1921; 10 October 1939–10 January 1949; 4 October 1950–3 April 1956; 25 July 1986–1 July 1994
- Country: United States
- Branch: United States Army
- Role: Light infantry (1986–1994)
- Size: Division
- Nicknames: "Red Star" "Sight Seein' Sixth" (former)
- Motto: On the Line
- Engagements: World War I; Meuse-Argonne; Alsace 1918; World War II; New Guinea; Luzon

Commanders
- Notable commanders: Edwin D. Patrick; Orlando Ward; Robert T. Frederick; David Bramlett

Insignia
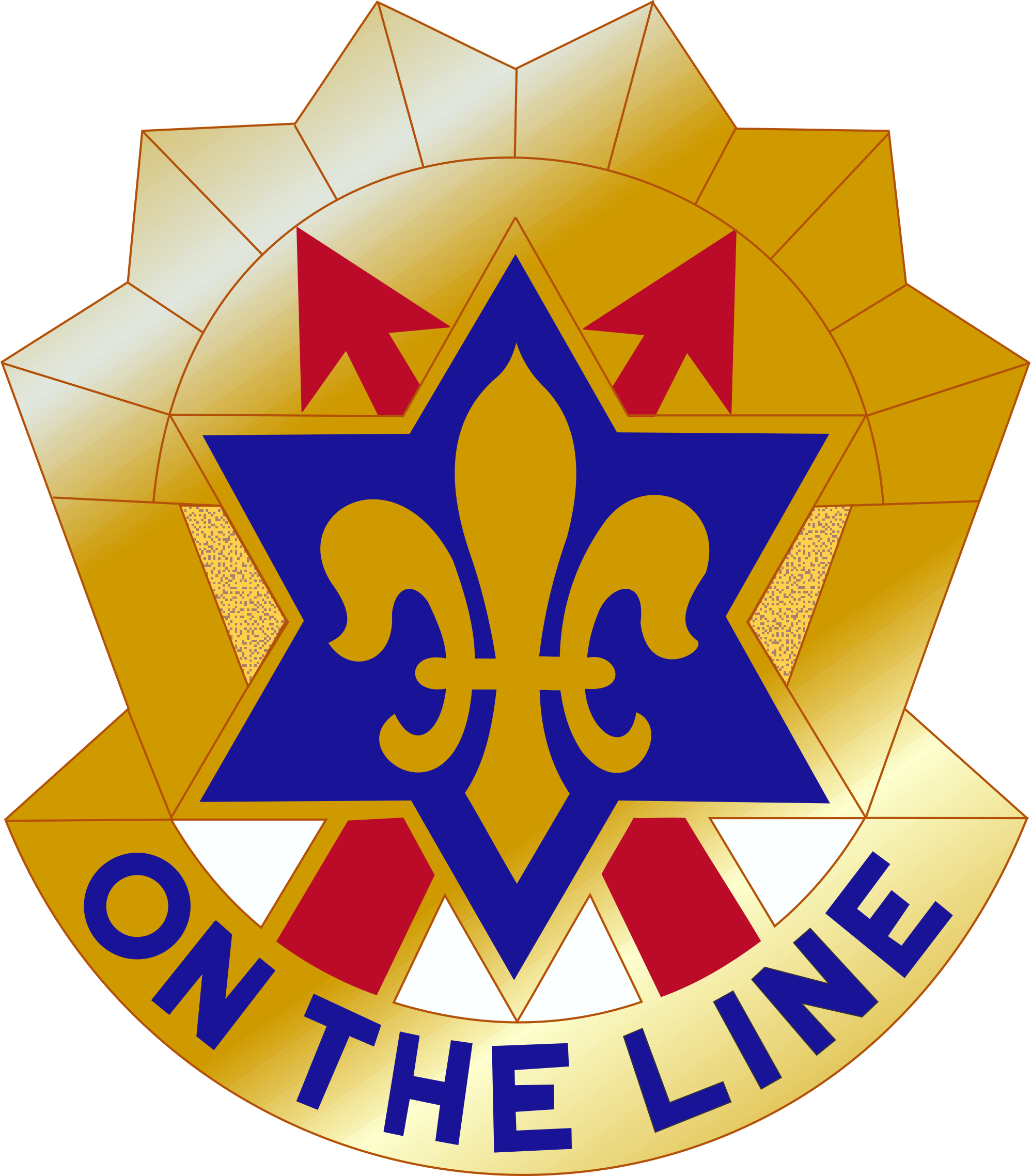
- Distinctive Unit Insignia

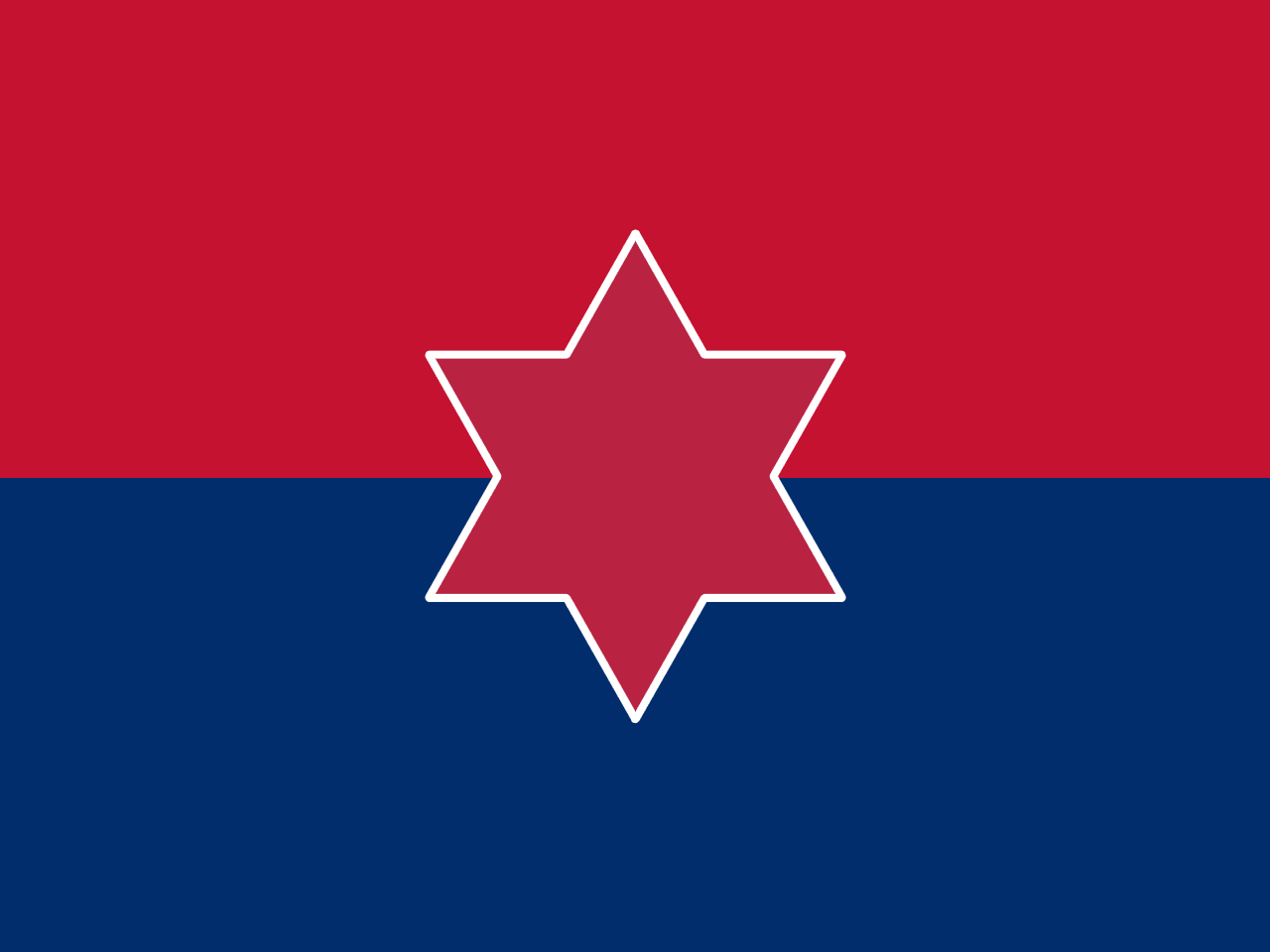
- Flag of the United States Army 6th Infantry Division

The 6th Infantry Division was an infantry division of the United States Army active in World War I, World War II, and the last years of the Cold War. Known as "Red Star", it was previously called the "Sight Seein' Sixth". The six points of the star refer to the unit's numerical designation.

== History ==
=== World War I ===
On 17 November 1917, the War Department directed that the 6th Division be organized with a cadre from Regular Army units stationed at Camp Forrest, Georgia, Forts Leavenworth and Riley, Kansas, Fort Sam Houston, Texas, Vancouver Barracks, Washington, and other posts. The division headquarters was established at Camp McClellan, Alabama. Division units commenced training at their respective posts; the 11th and 12th Infantry Brigades and the division trains at Camp Forrest, while the division artillery moved to the training center at Camp Doniphan, Oklahoma, in April. In May and June, the division headquarters, 12th Infantry Brigade, 16th and 17th Machine Gun Battalions, 6th Field Signal Battalion, and 6th Train Headquarters and Military Police moved to Camp Wadsworth, South Carolina. In May and June 1918, 15,000 Selective Service men arrived from Georgia, Indiana, Kentucky, Maryland, Minnesota, Ohio, Pennsylvania, South Carolina, and Wisconsin to complete the division.

Subordinate Units:

- Headquarters, 6th Division
- 11th Infantry Brigade
  - 51st Infantry Regiment (formed with a cadre from the 11th Infantry in June 1917)
  - 52nd Infantry Regiment (formed with a cadre from the 11th Infantry in June 1917)
  - 17th Machine Gun Battalion
- 12th Infantry Brigade
  - 53rd Infantry Regiment (formed with a cadre from the 6th Infantry in June 1917)
  - 54th Infantry Regiment (formed with a cadre from the 6th Infantry in June 1917)
  - 18th Machine Gun Battalion
- 6th Field Artillery Brigade
  - 3rd Field Artillery Regiment (75 mm)
  - 11th Field Artillery Regiment (155 mm) (formed with a cadre from the 6th Field Artillery in June 1917)
  - 78th Field Artillery Regiment (75 mm) (formed from the 20th Cavalry in June 1917)
  - 6th Trench Mortar Battery
- 16th Machine Gun Battalion
- 318th Engineer Regiment
- 6th Field Signal Battalion
- Headquarters Troop, 6th Division
- 6th Train Headquarters and Military Police
  - 6th Ammunition Train
  - 6th Supply Train
  - 6th Engineer Train
  - 6th Sanitary Train
    - 20th, 37th, 38th, and 40th Ambulance Companies and Field Hospitals

The division went overseas in June 1918, and saw 43 days of combat in the Geradmer sector, Vosges, France, 3 September-18 October 1918, and during the Meuse-Argonne offensive 1–11 November 1918. Casualties totalled 386 (KIA: 38; WIA: 348). Separately, the 11th Field Artillery became engaged earlier in the Meuse-Argonne offensive and fought from 19 October until the Armistice.

==== Commanders ====
Commanding officers (26 November 1917 – 1 June 1919)
Col. Charles E. Tayman	26 November 1917 – 28 December 1917
Brig. Gen. James Brailsford Erwin	29 December 1917 – 27 August 1918
Maj. Gen. Walter H. Gordon	28 August 1918 – 1 June 1919

=== Interwar period ===
The 6th Division arrived at Camp Mills, New York, on 10 June 1919 after completing 6 months of training at Aignay-le-Duc, France, and occupation duty near and in Bad Bertrich, Germany. On arrival, emergency period personnel were discharged from the service at Camp Mills. The division proceeded to Camp Grant, Illinois, arrived 17 June, and remained there until September 1921. As a part of the War Department's decision to maintain only three fully-active stateside infantry divisions, The 6th Division was inactivated, less the 12th Infantry Brigade and several smaller units, on 30 September 1921 at Camp Grant. Concurrently, the inactivated units were assigned active associate units for mobilization purposes. The 6th Division was allotted to the Sixth Corps Area for mobilization responsibility and assigned to the VI Corps. Camp Grant was designated as the mobilization and training station for the division upon reactivation. During the period 1921–39, the active elements of the 6th Division consisted of the 12th Infantry Brigade and other assorted divisional elements that formed the base force from which the remainder of the division would be reactivated in the event of war. The division headquarters was organized on 17 April 1926 with Organized Reserve personnel as a “Regular Army Inactive” (RAI) unit at Chicago, Illinois. Additionally, most of the division's inactive elements were also organized in the Chicago area by mid-1927 as RAI units. The active elements of the division maintained habitual training relationships with divisional RAI units, as well as those of the VI Corps, XVI Corps, and the 85th, 86th, and 101st Divisions. The RAI and Reserve units often trained with the active elements of the division during summer training camps which were usually conducted at Camp Custer, Michigan, Fort Sheridan, Illinois, and at the regimental home stations of the 2nd and 6th Infantry Regiments. These two regiments also supported the Reserve units’ conduct of the Citizens' Military Training Camps held at Fort Sheridan and Jefferson Barracks, Missouri.

The 12th Infantry Brigade, reinforced by the active elements of the 6th Tank Company, 6th Field Artillery Brigade, 3rd and 14th Field Artillery Regiments, and the 6th Quartermaster Regiment, held maneuvers at Camp Custer in those years when funds were available. During these maneuvers, the 6th Division headquarters was often formed in a provisional status to train Regular and Reserve officers in division-level command and control procedures. The division was also provisionally formed for the August 1936 Second Army maneuvers at Camp Custer and near Allegan, Michigan. For that maneuver, the division (12th Infantry Brigade as the nucleus) was reinforced by the Illinois National Guard's 8th Infantry (Colored), in addition to the other active divisional elements. Under the new “triangular” tables of organization, the 6th Division was reactivated 10 October 1939 at Fort Lewis, Washington.

=== World War II ===
Activated: 12 October 1939 at Fort Lewis, Washington state

- Overseas: 21 July 1943
- Campaigns: New Guinea (with arrowhead device), Luzon (with arrowhead device)
- Days of combat: 306
- Distinguished Unit Citations: 7
- Awards: MH: 2, DSC: 10, DSM: 3, SS: 697, LM: 18, DFC: 3, SM: 94, BSM: 3,797, AM: 45.

==== Reactivation ====
Under the new “triangular” tables of organization, the 6th Division was reactivated 10 October 1939 at Fort Lewis, Washington. It was transferred to Fort Jackson, South Carolina, on 9 November 1939, relieved from the VI Corps, and attached to the IV Corps. After maneuvers in Louisiana in May 1940, the division was transferred to Fort Snelling, Minnesota, and assigned to the Second Army. The division participated in the Second Army maneuvers at Camp Ripley, Minnesota, in August 1940, in the Second Army maneuvers in Arkansas in August 1941, and in the GHQ maneuvers in Louisiana in September–October 1941. After the GHQ maneuvers, the 6th Division was moved to Fort Leonard Wood, Missouri, for permanent station and arrived there 10 October 1941.

In March 1942, the 6th Infantry Division was converted to a motorized division equipped with half-tracks; only the 3rd Battalion, 1st Infantry made actual use of them during training maneuvers at the Desert Training Center, and "most...never left [Fort Leonard Wood] and some never left the motor pool." Only a few months after they were issued, the half-tracks were taken away after the tables of organization of the motorized division were revised, and they were replaced with 2 1/2-ton trucks. The division was reorganized as a standard infantry division in May 1943.

==== Division organization ====
Afterwards the 6th Infantry Division consisted of the following units.

6th Infantry Division organization (click to enlarge)

- 6th Infantry Division
  - 6th Infantry Division Headquarters
  - 6th Cavalry Reconnaissance Troop (Mechanized) (M3 scout cars and then M8 Greyhound armored cars)
  - 1st Infantry Regiment
    - Headquarters and Headquarters Company
    - 3× Infantry battalions
      - each battalion consists of: 1× Headquarters and Headquarters Company, 3× Rifle companies, 1× Heavy Weapons Company
    - Cannon Company (T12 Gun Motor Carriages and T19 Howitzer Motor Carriages, later replaced by either M3 105mm towed howitzers or M7 Priest self propelled howitzers)
    - Anti-Tank Company (M3 37mm anti-tank guns, which were replaced by 1944 with M1 57mm anti-tank guns)
    - Service Company
  - 20th Infantry Regiment
    - same organization as 1st Infantry Regiment
  - 63rd Infantry Regiment
    - same organization as 1st Infantry Regiment
  - 6th Infantry Division Artillery
    - Headquarters and Headquarters Battery
    - 1st Field Artillery Battalion
      - Headquarters and Headquarters Battery
      - 3× Batteries (M2 105mm towed howitzers)
      - Service Battery
    - 51st Field Artillery Battalion
      - same organization as 1st Field Artillery Battalion
    - 53rd Field Artillery Battalion
      - same organization as 1st Field Artillery Battalion
    - 80th Field Artillery Battalion
      - Headquarters and Headquarters Battery
      - 3× Batteries (M1 155mm towed howitzers)
      - Service Battery
  - Headquarters Special Troops
    - Headquarters Company, 6th Infantry Division
    - 6th Signal Company
    - 6th Quartermaster Company
    - 706th Ordnance Light Maintenance Company
    - 6th Military Police Platoon
    - 6th Infantry Division Band (attached)
  - 6th Engineer Combat Battalion
    - Headquarters and Headquarters and Service Company
    - 3× Engineer combat companies
  - 6th Medical Battalion
    - Headquarters and Headquarters Detachment
    - 3× Collecting companies
    - Clearing Company

==== Combat chronicle ====
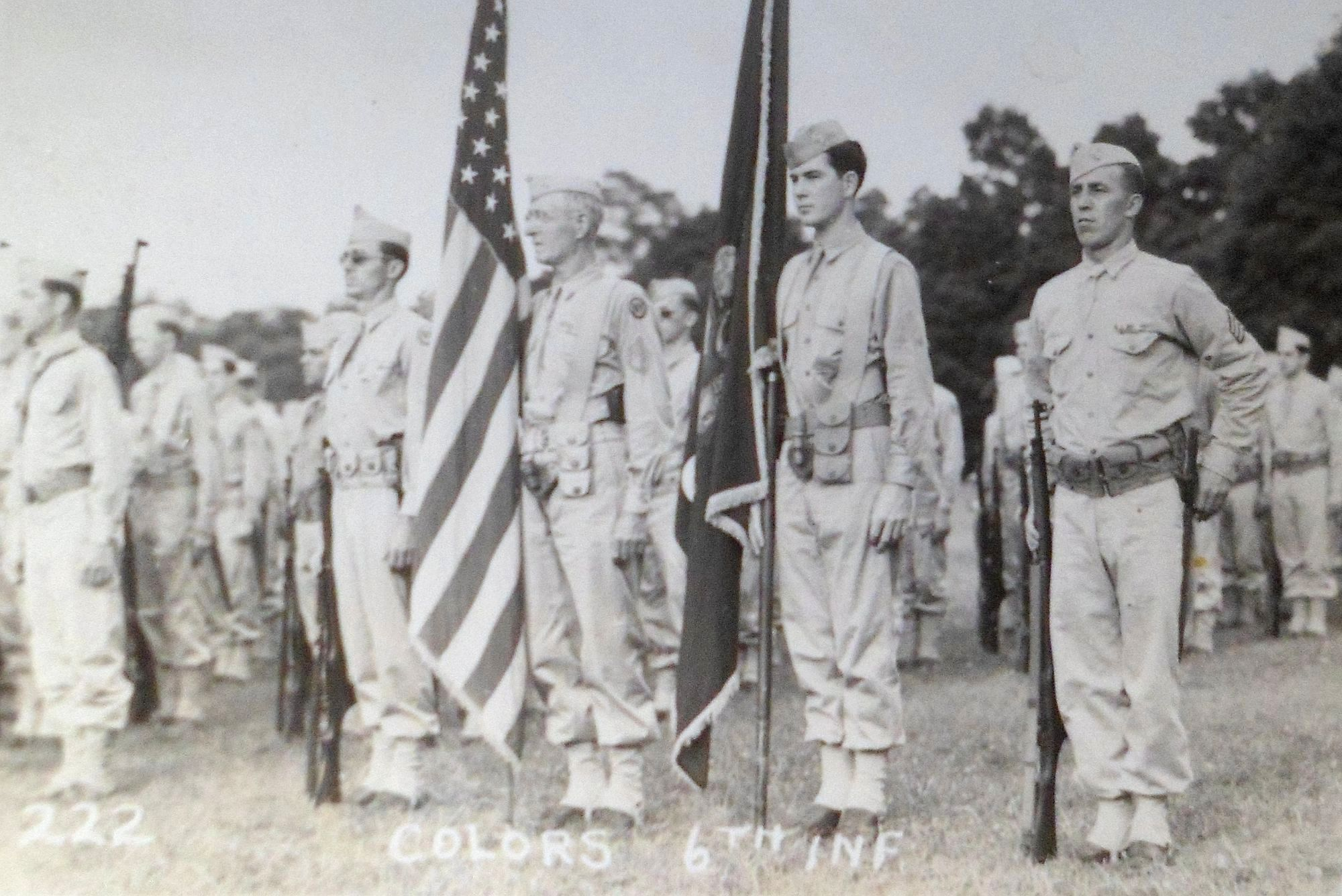
Color Guard of the 6th Infantry Division 1945

The division moved to Hawaii in July and August 1943 to assume defensive positions on Oahu, training meanwhile in jungle warfare. It moved to Milne Bay, New Guinea, 31 January 1944, and trained until early June 1944. The division first saw combat in the Toem-Wakde area of Dutch New Guinea, engaging in active patrolling 14–18 June, after taking up positions 6–14 June. Moving west of Toem, it fought the bloody Battle of Lone Tree Hill, 21–30 June, and secured the Maffin Bay area by 12 July.

After a brief rest, the division made an assault landing at Sansapor, 30 July, on the Vogelkop Peninsula. The 6th secured the coast from Cape Waimak to the Mega River and garrisoned the area until December 1944.

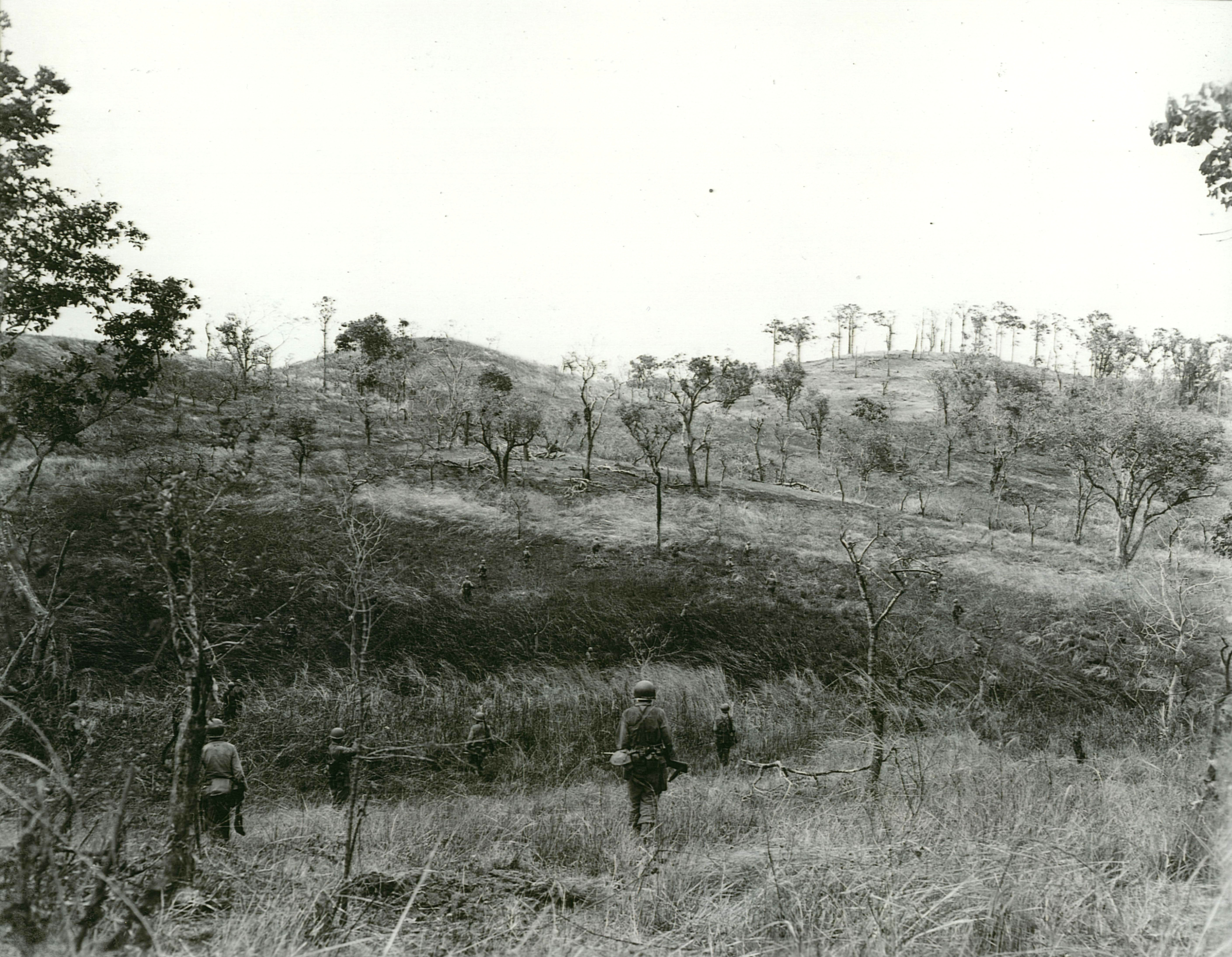
G.I.'s of Company I, 20th Infantry Regiment, 6th Infantry Division, advance up the side of a hill on the Kebayashi Line near Manila, Luzon, March 1945.

The division landed at Lingayen Gulf, Luzon, in the Philippines on D-day, 9 January 1945, and pursued the Japanese into the Cabanatuan hills, 17–21 January, capturing Muñoz on 7 February. On 27 January, Special Operations units also attached to the Sixth United States Army took part in the Raid at Cabanatuan. The division then drove northeast to Dingalan Bay and Baler Bay, 13 February, isolating enemy forces in southern Luzon. The U.S. 1st Infantry Regiment operated on Bataan together with the Philippine Commonwealth forces, 14–21 February, cutting the peninsula from Abucay to Bagac.

The division then took part in the Battle of Manila, shifting to the Shimbu Line northeast of Manila, on 24 February to take part in the longest continuous combat operation of the division in the Battle of Wawa Dam. The 6th Division faced a tough seesaw battle versus the Shimbu Group as the Japanese Shimbu Group created network of tunnels, artillery positions, and machine gun nests in the hill country of Antipolo, San Mateo, and Montalban in Rizal Province. On March 14, while divisional commander of the 6th Edwin D. Patrick was inspecting troops near Mount Mataba, south of Montalban, a Japanese soldier who had remained in hiding behind American lines, opened fire from 75 yd (69 m) with a machine gun, mortally wounding Patrick, who died the next day. The terrain is formed by sharp hills and deep valleys, where direct assaults could be made in a day, and the next day units would be forced to retreat. The 6th Division took Mount Mataba on 17 April, Mount Pacawagan on 29 April, Bolog on 29 June, Lane's Ridge of Mount Santo Domingo on 10 July, and Kiangan, 12 July. The 6th remained with the Philippine Military forces in the Cagayan Valley and the Cordillera Mountains until VJ-day.

After the war, the division moved to Korea and controlled the southern half of the United States zone of occupation until inactivated.

==== Casualties ====
- Total battle casualties: 2,370
- Killed in action: 410
- Wounded in action: 1,957
- Missing in action: 3

==== Medal of Honor recipients ====
Medal of Honor recipients for the 6th Infantry Division during World War II:

- Corporal Melvin Mayfield of Company D, 20th Infantry Regiment, 6th Infantry Division—Cordillera Mountains, Luzon, Philippine Islands, 29 July 1945
- Second Lieutenant (then T/Sgt.) Donald E. Rudolph of Company E, 2nd Battalion, 20th Infantry Regiment, 6th Infantry Division—Munoz, Luzon, Philippine Islands, 5 February 1945

==== Commanders ====
Commanding officers (October 1939 – January 1949)
Brig. Gen. Clement Augustus Trott	October 1939 – October 1940
Brig. Gen. Frederick E. Uhl	October 1940 – December 1940
Maj. Gen. Clarence S. Ridley	January 1941 – August 1942
Maj. Gen. Durward S. Wilson	September 1942 – October 1942
Maj. Gen. Franklin C. Sibert	October 1942 – August 1944
Maj. Gen. Edwin Davies Patrick †	August 1944 – March 1945
Maj. Gen. Charles E. Hurdis	March 1945 – April 1946
Col. George M. Williamson Jr.	April 1946 – June 1946
Maj. Gen. Albert E. Brown	June 1946 – September 1946
Brig. Gen. John T. Pierce	September 1946 – October 1946
Maj. Gen. Orlando Ward	October 1946 – 1 January 1949

=== Cold War ===
The 6th Infantry Division was reactivated on 4 October 1950 at Fort Ord, California. There, the division remained throughout the Korean War, training troops and providing personnel for combat, but was never itself deployed overseas and was again inactivated on 3 April 1956.

Because of the American military buildup during the Vietnam War, the 6th Infantry Division was reactivated in 1967 at Fort Campbell, Kentucky, and later, a forward brigade was deployed to Hawaii. The demands of the war reduced most units stationed in the United States to holding pools for men returning from tours of duty in Vietnam, training units for men soon to be deployed, and forces to be potentially used in control of domestic civil unrest, rather than combat. In June 1968, the Joint Chiefs of Staff declared the division, along with every other stateside division and brigade except for the 82nd Airborne Division, deficient in all categories including personnel, training, and logistics. The 6th Infantry Division was inactivated again on 25 July 1968.

The last incarnation of the division came on 16 April 1986 under the command of Major General Johnnie H. Corns at Fort Richardson, Alaska, when the assets of the 172nd Infantry Brigade were used to reactivate the 6th Infantry Division (Light). Over the next seven years the 6th was the U.S. Army's primary Arctic warfare division.

==== Structure in 1989 ====
The planned activation of two additional light infantry battalions for the division, one at Fort Richardson in October 1988, and one at Fort Wainwright in May 1989, was cancelled with the Fiscal Year 1988 budget. To round out the division, the 6th Battalion, 297th Infantry, of the Alaska Army National Guard was activated on 1 September 1989.

At the end of the Cold War, parts of the division were organized as follows:

- 6th Infantry Division (Light), Fort Richardson, Alaska
  - Headquarters & Headquarters Company
  - 1st Brigade, Fort Richardson
    - 1st Battalion (Light), 17th Infantry Regiment (United States)
    - 2nd Battalion (Light), 17th Infantry Regiment. (In October 1989, 2-17 Infantry became 1-501 Infantry)
    - 1st Battalion (Airborne), 501st Infantry Regiment (United States)
    - 6th Battalion (Mechanized), 297th Infantry Regiment (Alaska Army National Guard)
  - 2nd Brigade, Fort Wainwright
    - 4th Battalion (Light), 9th Infantry Regiment (United States)
    - 5th Battalion (Light), 9th Infantry Regiment
  - 205th Infantry Brigade (Light), Fort Snelling, Minnesota (Army Reserve)
    - Headquarters and Headquarters Company
    - 3rd Battalion, 3rd Infantry, Saint Paul, Minnesota
    - 1st Battalion, 409th Infantry, St. Cloud, Minnesota
    - 1st Battalion, 410th Infantry, Iowa City, Iowa
    - 3rd Battalion, 14th Field Artillery, Sioux City, Iowa (18 × M101 105 mm towed howitzer)
    - Support Battalion
    - Cavalry Troop
    - Engineer Company
  - Aviation Brigade, Fort Wainwright
    - Headquarters & Headquarters Company
    - 4/9th Air Cavalry Squadron
    - 2nd Battalion, 123rd Aviation (Attack), Saint Paul, Minnesota (Army Reserve)
    - 4th Battalion, 123rd Aviation (Combat Support)
  - Division Artillery, Fort Richardson, Alaska
    - Headquarters & Headquarters Battery
    - 4th Battalion, 11th Field Artillery, Fort Richardson (18 × M101 105 mm towed howitzer)
    - 5th Battalion, 11th Field Artillery, Fort Wainwright (18 × M101 105mm towed howitzer)
    - Battery G, 11th Field Artillery, Mankato, Minnesota (Army Reserve, 8 × M198 155 mm towed howitzer)
  - 6th Division Support Command
    - Headquarters & Headquarters Company, 706th Maintenance Battalion (Arctic Workhorse) which included Medical, Supply, Transportation and Maintenance Companies
    - 431st Aviation Intermediate Maintenance Company, Saint Paul, Minnesota (Army Reserve)
  - 1st Battalion, 188th Air Defense Artillery, Grand Forks, North Dakota (North Dakota Army National Guard)
  - 6th Engineer Battalion, Fort Wainwright
  - 6th Signal Battalion, Fort Richardson
  - 106th Military Intelligence Battalion, Fort Richardson
  - 6th Military Police Company
  - Chemical Company
  - 6th Division Band

In 1988, the airborne companies ("Charlie Airborne") of 1-17 Infantry, 2-17 Infantry and 4-9 Infantry were consolidated into 2-17 Infantry, giving the 6th Infantry Division an airborne battalion.

Notable operational deployments of the division included an eight-month deployment to the Sinai Peninsula in Egypt by 1st Battalion, 17th Infantry Regiment, in 1990 as part of the Multinational Force and Observers. The deployment began as a six-month rotation, but was extended in August 1990 due to the Iraqi invasion of Kuwait which precipitated Operation Desert Shield and delayed the arrival of their relieving unit. The division headquarters was moved from Fort Richardson to Fort Wainwright (near Fairbanks) in 1990. Commanders during the Arctic activation included Maj. Gen. Johnnie H. Corns (1986–1988), Maj. Gen. Samuel E. Ebbesen (1990–1992) and Maj. Gen. David A. Bramlett (1992–1994). The division had two active maneuver brigades and the Army Reserve's 205th Infantry Brigade (Light) was assigned as the division's roundout force. The 1st Battalion, 188th Air Defense Artillery of the North Dakota Army National Guard served as the division's roundout Air Defense Artillery. They were the only National Guard Air Defense battalion to ever roundout an active duty division.

=== Inactivation ===
The division was inactivated most recently on 6 July 1994, and reduced to a single brigade, the 1st Brigade, 6th Infantry Division. In reality, the 6th no longer existed as a division and command of the brigade fell under the 10th Mountain Division (Light Infantry) at Fort Drum, New York. In April 1998, 1st Brigade was reflagged back to the separate 172nd Infantry Brigade, from which the division had been reestablished in 1986. The 172nd Brigade was then reflagged as the 1st Brigade Combat Team (Stryker), 25th Infantry Division on 16 December 2006.

On 16 October 2008 the division's HHC, 6th Engineer Battalion was reactivated as a non-divisional unit in Alaska. In this new role it is configured as an Airborne unit with two subordinate engineer companies: the 23d Engineer Company and the 84th Engineer Company.
