= Bataan =

Province in Central Luzon, Philippines

- Province
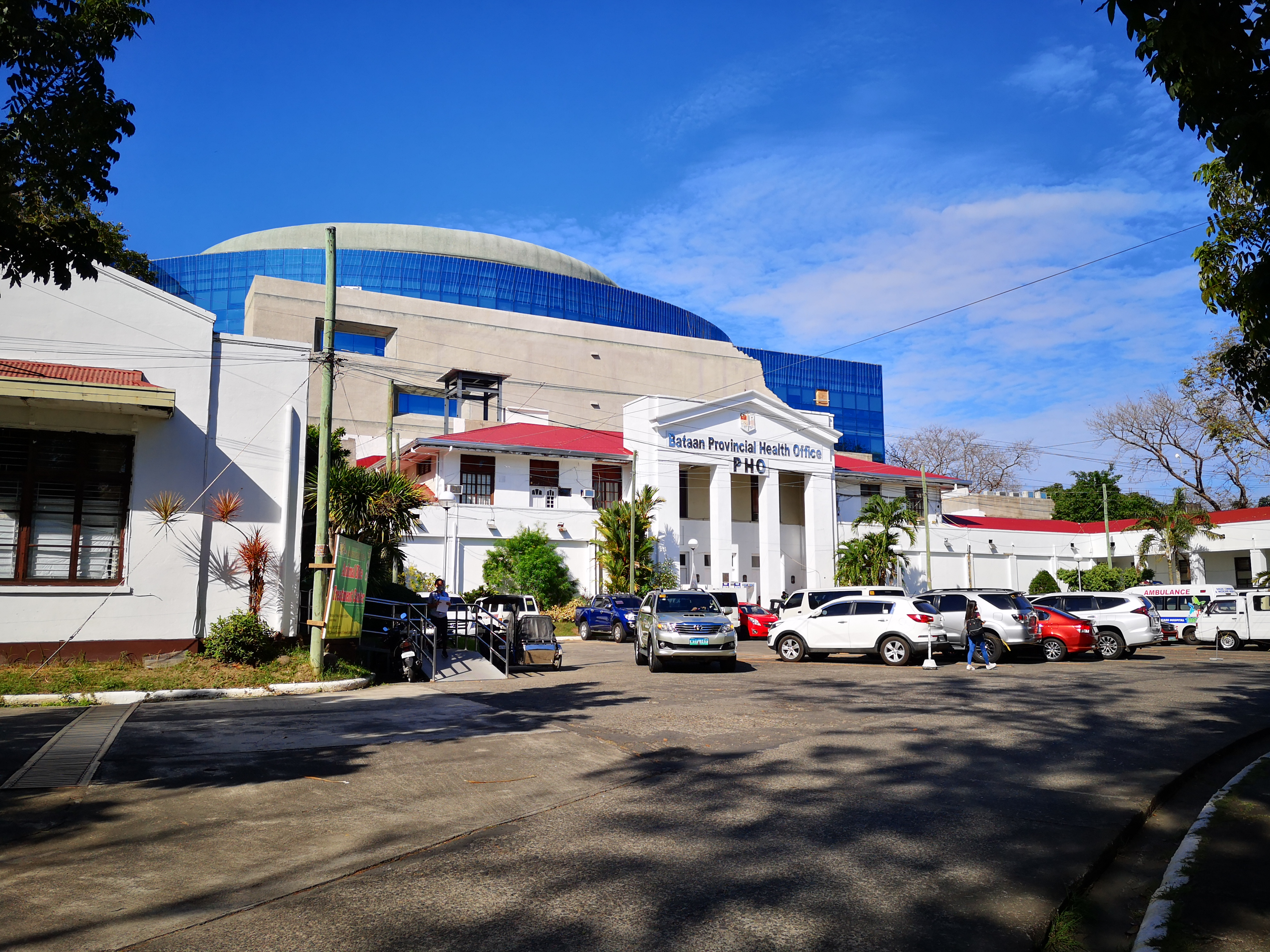
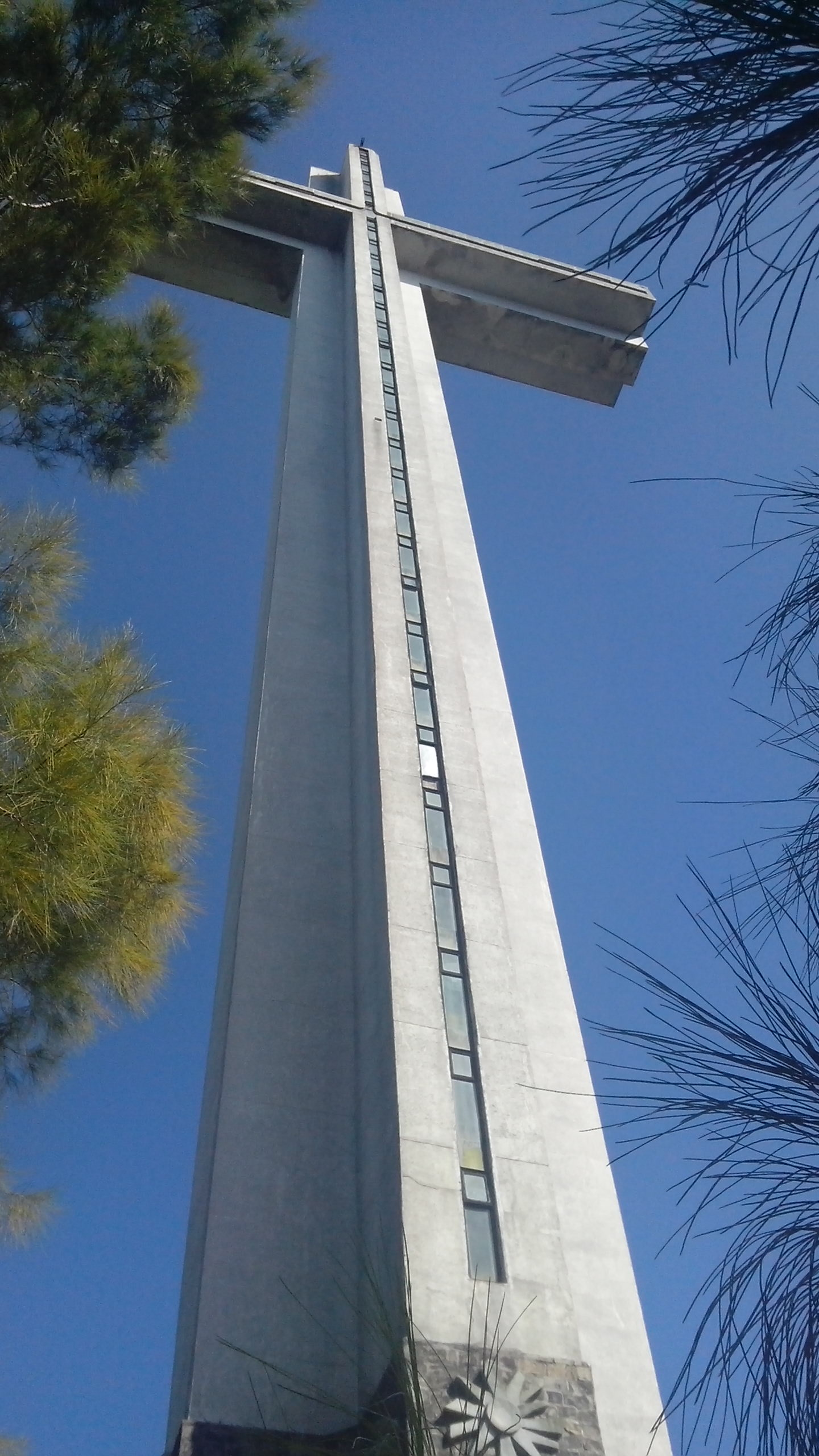
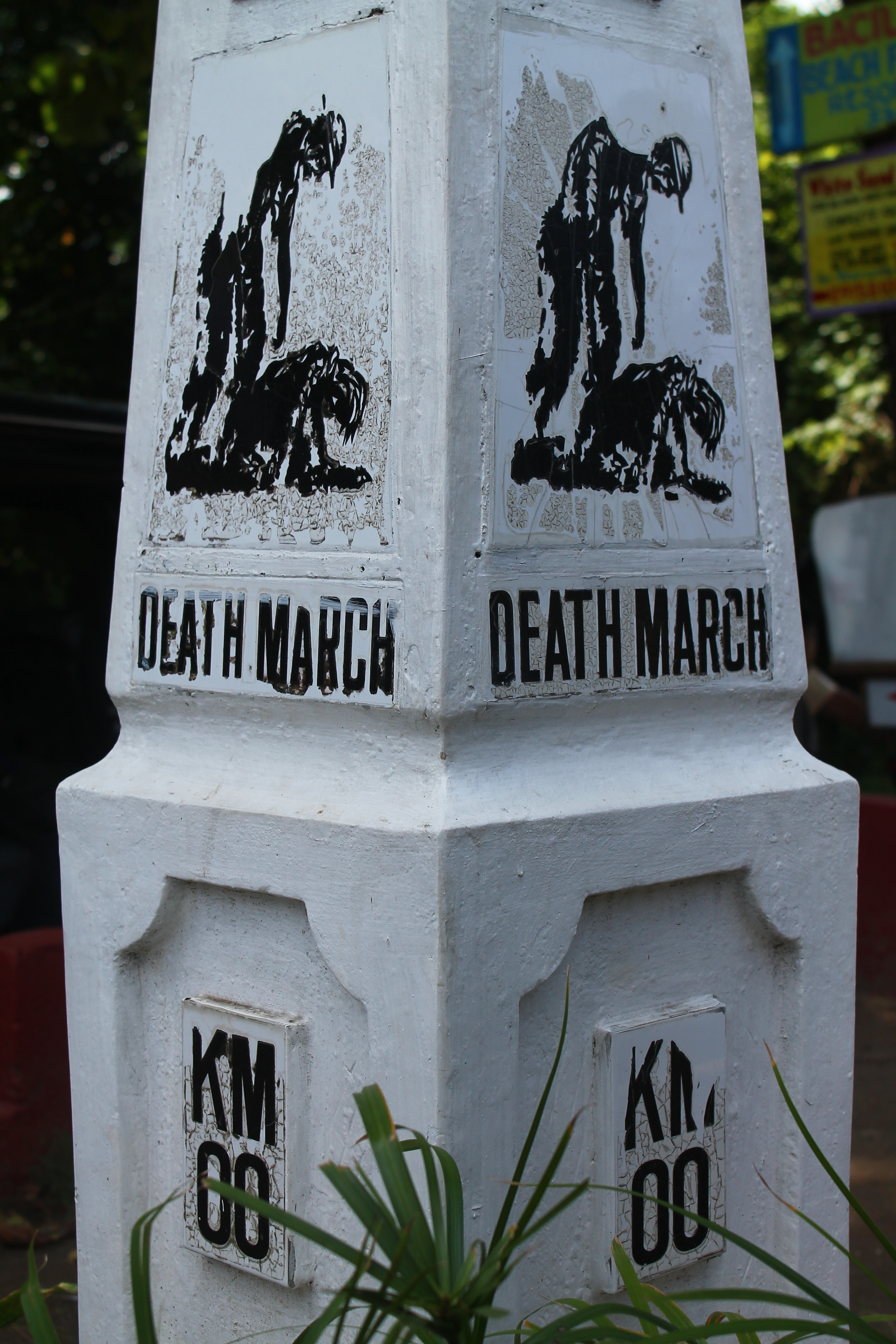
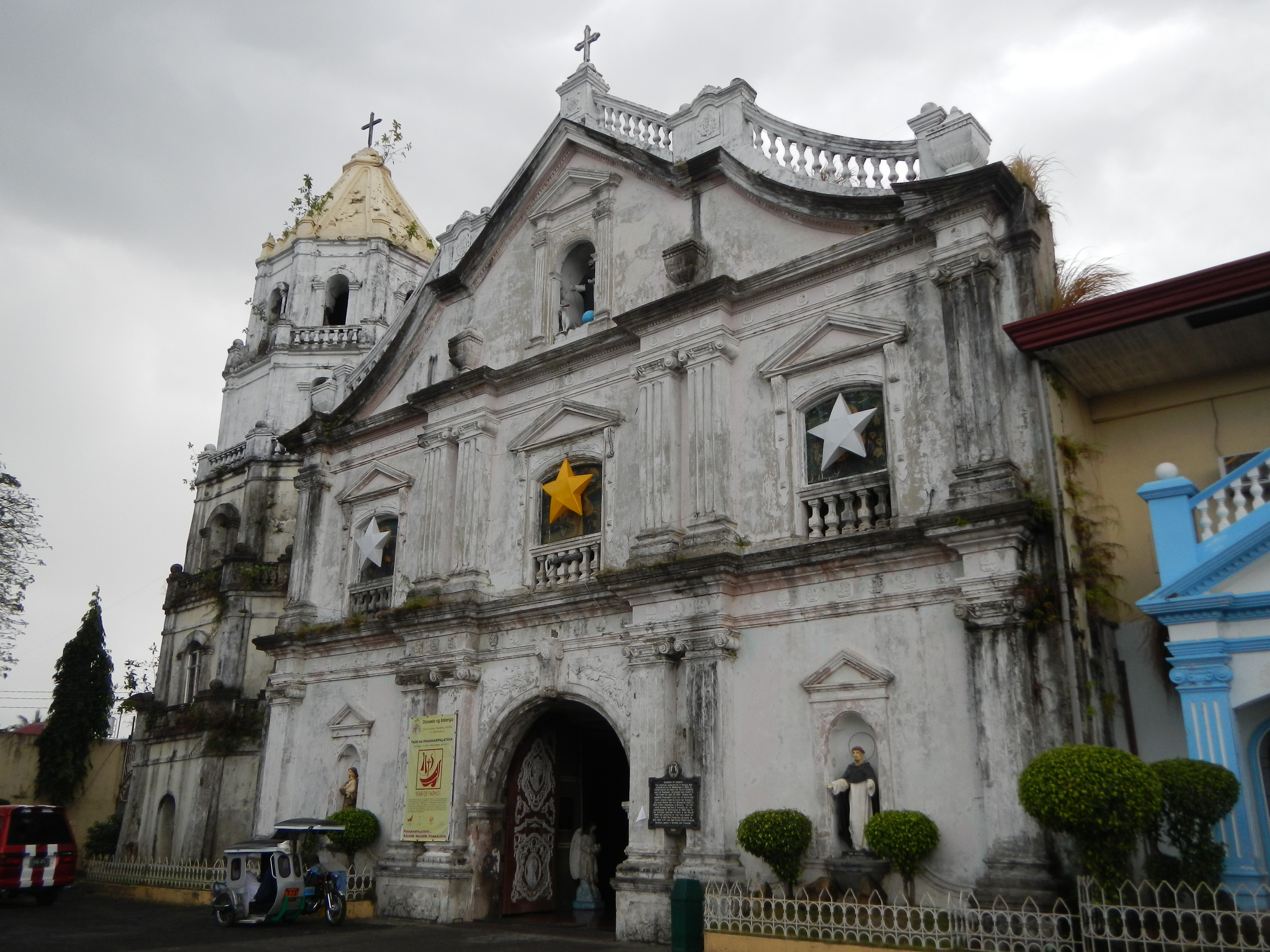
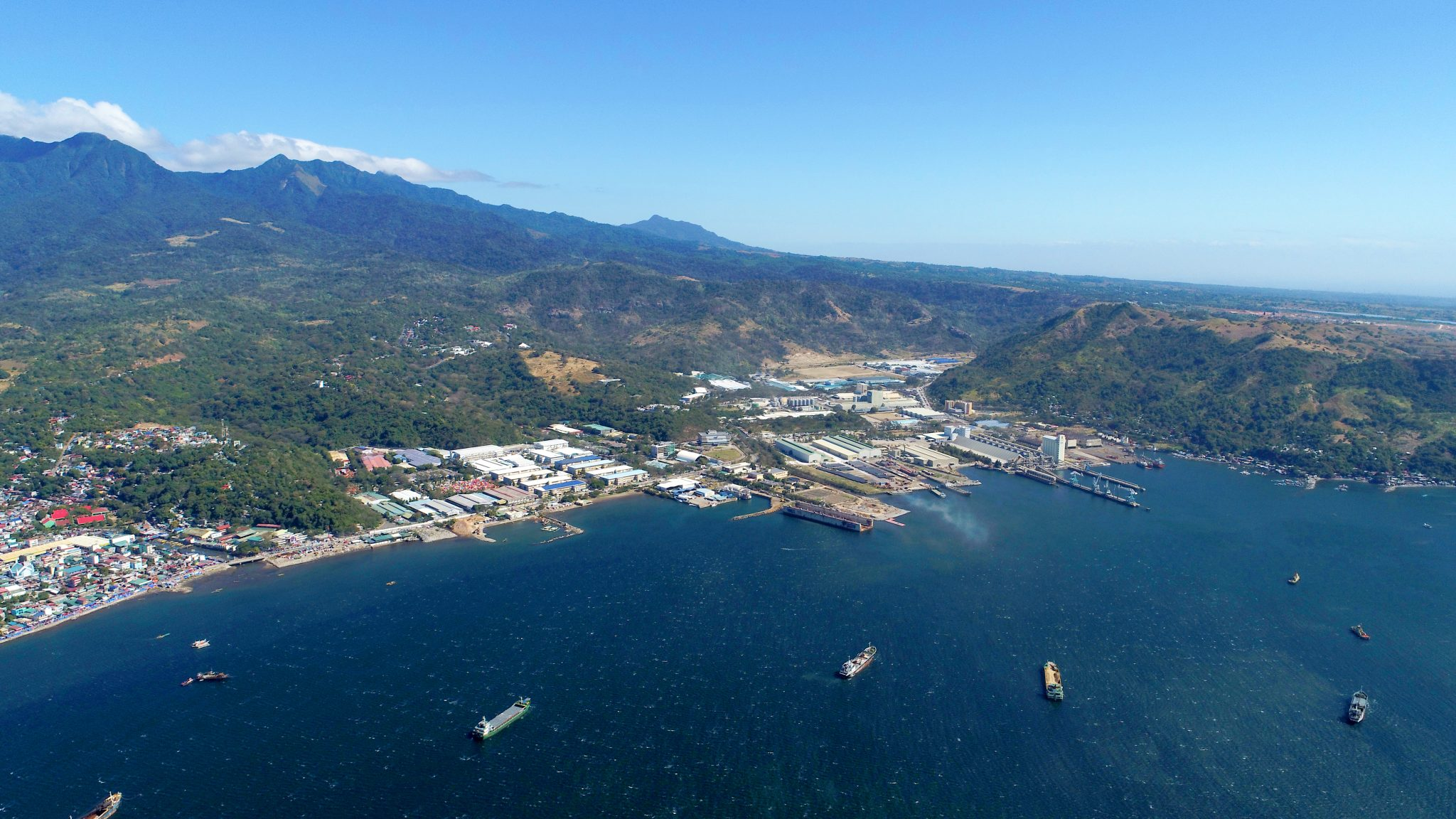
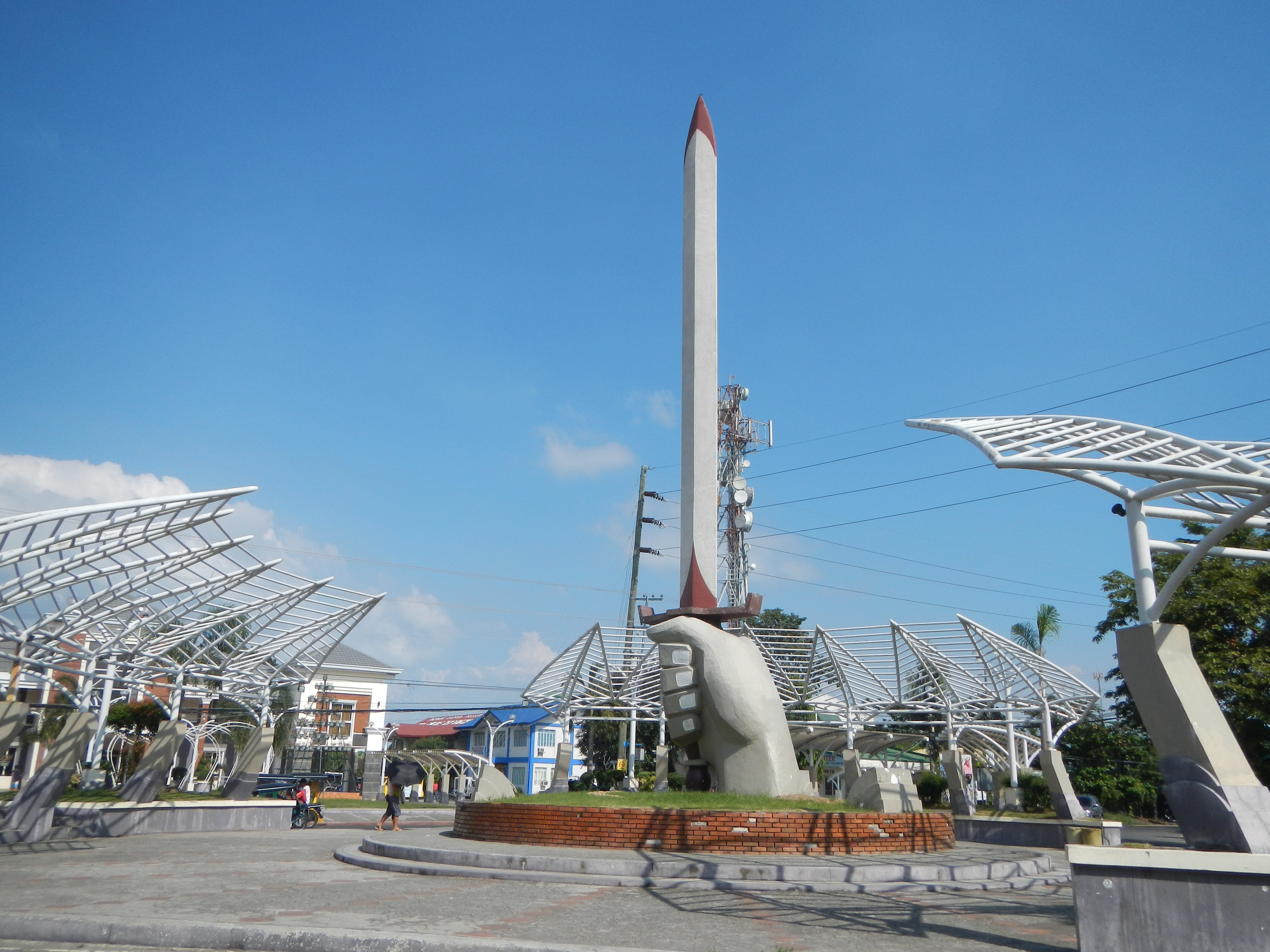
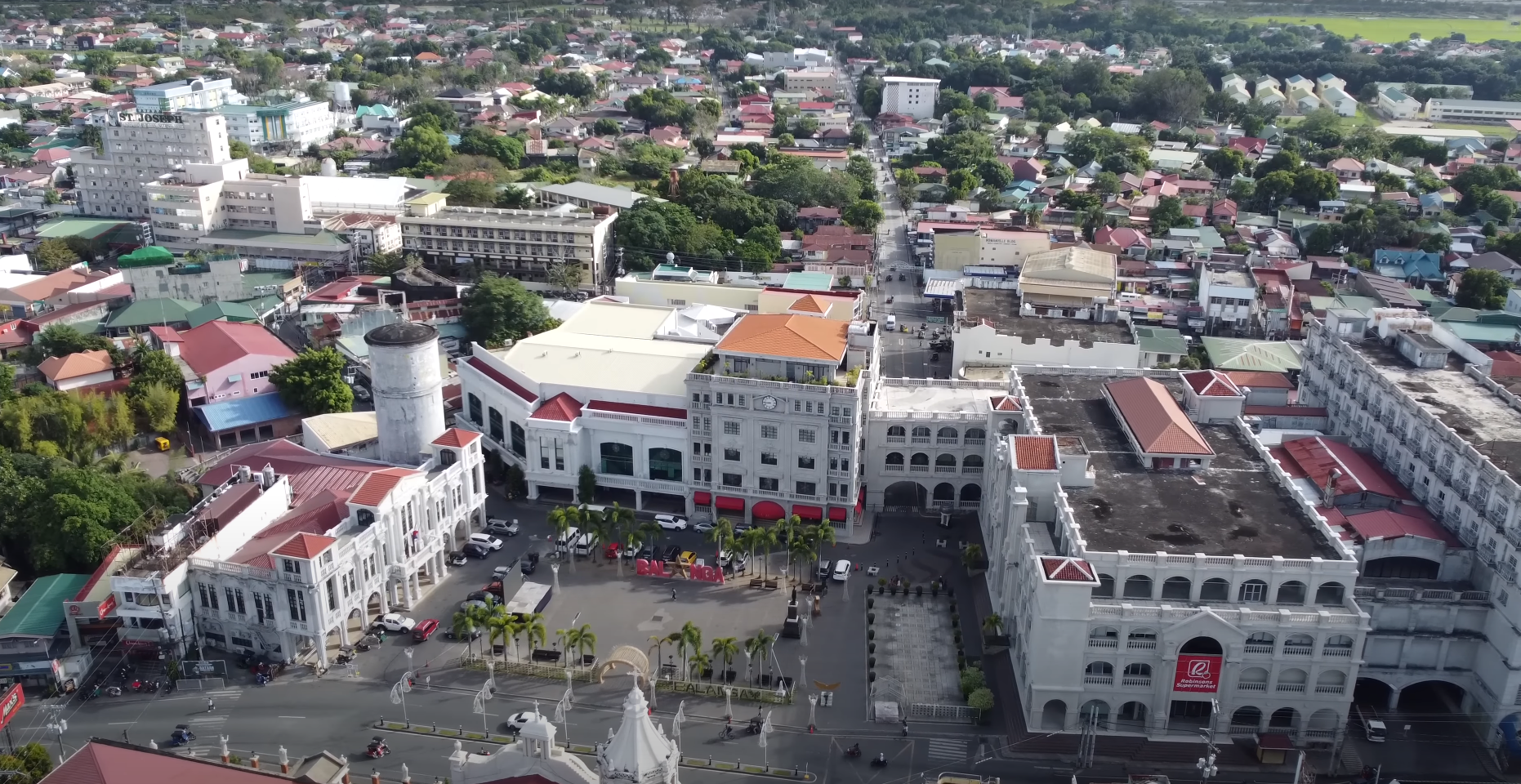
- From left-to-right, top-to-bottom: Bataan Provincial Capitol Building, Mount Samat National Shrine, Bataan Death March Zero-Kilometer Marker, St. Dominic Parish in Abucay, the Freeport Area of Bataan, the Flaming Sword obelisk at Pilar, the Plaza Mayor de Balanga

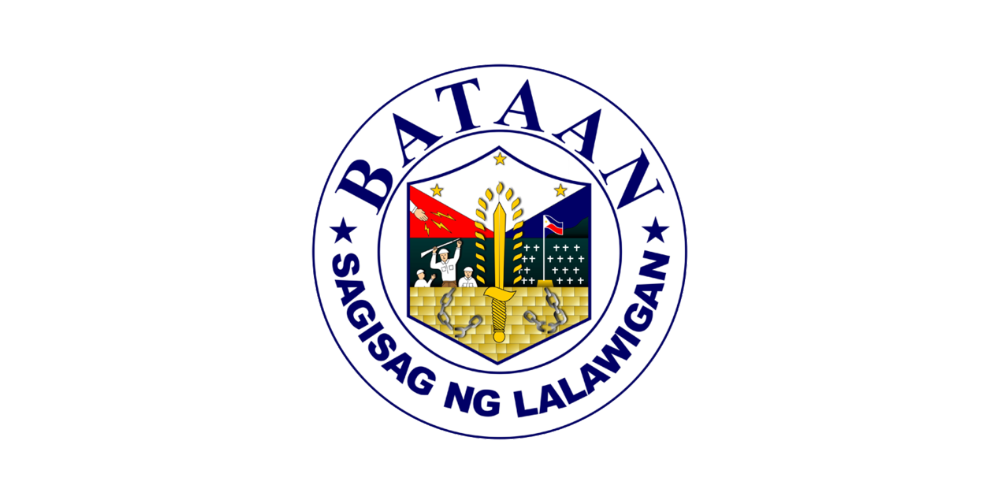
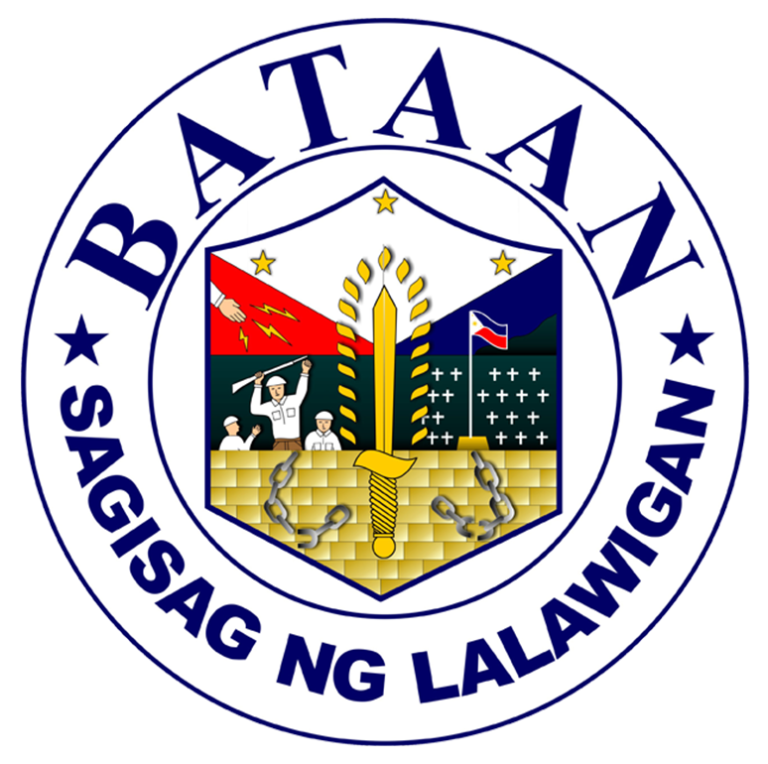
- Flag Seal

- Location in the Philippines
- Interactive map of Bataan
- Coordinates: 14°41′N 120°27′E
- Country: Philippines
- Region: Central Luzon
- Founded: 11 January 1757
- Capital: Balanga
- Largest LGU: Mariveles

Government
  - Governor: Jose Enrique S. Garcia III (PFP)
  - Vice Governor: Ma. Cristina M. Garcia (PFP)
  - Legislature: Bataan Provincial Board
  - Electorate: 586,044 voters (2025)

Area
  - Total: 1,372.98 km^{2} (530.11 sq mi)
  - Rank: 71st out of 82
- Highest elevation (Mount Mariveles): 1,398 m (4,587 ft)

Population (2024 census)
  - Total: 891,440
  - Rank: 35th out of 82
  - Density: 649.27/km^{2} (1,681.6/sq mi)
  - Rank: 8th out of 82
  - Households: 208,941
- Demonyms: Bataeño; Bataanense

Divisions
  - Independent cities: 0
  - Component cities: 1: Balanga
  - Municipalities: 11: Abucay; Bagac; Dinalupihan; Hermosa; Limay; Mariveles; Morong; Orani; Orion; Pilar; Samal
  - Barangays: 237
  - Districts: Legislative districts of Bataan

Economy
  - Income class: 1st provincial income class
  - Poverty incidence: 6.6% (2023)
  - Revenue: ₱ 4,822 million (2024)
  - Assets: ₱ 13,483 million (2024)
  - Expenditure: ₱ 3,713 million (2024)
  - Liabilities: ₱ 4,805 million (2024)
- Time zone: UTC+8 (PHT)
- PSGC: 030800000
- IDD : area code: +63 (0)47
- ISO 3166 code: PH-BAN
- Ethnic groups: Tagalog (88%); Kapampangan (4%); Sambal (2%); Others (3%)
- Spoken languages: Tagalog; Kapampangan; Filipino; English
- Website: bataan.gov.ph

Bataan (/bɑːtɑːˈʔɑːn/, /bɑːˈtɑːn/, IPA: [bɐtɐˈʔan]), officially the Province of Bataan, is a province in the Central Luzon region of the Philippines. Its capital is the city of Balanga while Mariveles is the largest town in the province. Occupying the entire Bataan Peninsula on Luzon, Bataan is bordered by the provinces of Zambales and Pampanga to the north. The peninsula faces the South China Sea to the west and Subic Bay to the north-west, and encloses Manila Bay to the east.

The Battle of Bataan is known in history as one of the last stands of American and Filipino soldiers before they were overwhelmed by the Japanese forces in World War II. The Bataan Death March was named after the province, where the infamous march started.

== History ==
=== Aeta people ===
The first inhabitants of the Bataan peninsula are the Ayta Magbeken people. The next group of inhabitants were Kapampangans, who settled on eastern Bataan.

=== Tagalog migration ===
Later on, Tagalogs from southern Luzon, most specifically Cavite, migrated to parts of Bataan. The Ayta Magbeken migrated towards the mountain areas of Bataan by the end of the 16th century.

=== Spanish rule ===
Several villages in the coastal plains of Bataan were already thriving communities when Spanish missionaries found them in 1570s. These coastal villages were inhabited by natives who were predominantly fishermen, farmers and craftsmen. Meanwhile, the hillsides were peopled by Aeta tribes.

In 1647, Dutch naval forces landed in the country in an attempt to seize the islands from Spain. The Dutch massacred the people of Abucay in Bataan.

Historian Cornelio Bascara documents that the province of Bataan was established on 11 January 1757, by Governor-General Pedro Manuel Arandia out of towns (San Juan de Dinalupihan, Llana Hermosa, Orani, Samal, Abucay, Balanga, Pilar and Orion/Udyong) belonging to Pampanga and the corregimiento of Mariveles which, at that time, included Morong, Bagac, and Maragondon across Manila Bay. Limay, initially a barrio of Orion/Udyong, is the twelfth town of Bataan created only in 1917. Tagalogs migrated to east Bataan, where Kapampangans assimilated to the Tagalogs. Kapampangans were displaced to the towns near Pampanga by that time, along with the Aetas. By the end of the 1700s, Bataan had 3,082 native families and 619 Spanish Filipino families. By year 1818, the population increased with the census recording 5,205 tributes or families of which, a fresh number of: 24 families were immigrant Christian Chinese-Filipinos, 3 were pagan Chinese-Filipinos, 65 were new Spanish-Filipino Mestizo families (as the older Spanish-Filipino mestizos assimilated), and 7 were new pure Spanish-settler families. The Spanish Filipino families were of these number and dispersed in the following locations: 1 at Orion, 3 at Mariveles, 1 at Llana-Hermosa, 24 at Orani, 4 at Samar 20 at Abucay, and 12 at Balanga

=== Japanese invasion ===
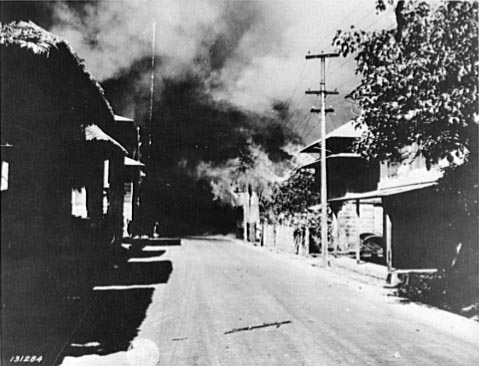
March 1942: burning houses after a Japanese bombing raid in Bataan

Bataan featured prominently during World War II. Prior to the 1941 Japanese invasion, Bataan was a military reservation for the purpose of defending the fortress island of Corregidor. The US Army stored nearly 1,000,000 US gallons (3,800 m^{3}) of gasoline there, along with various munitions. At the southern tip of the peninsula the U.S. Navy had established a small base at the port of Mariveles.

Shortly after the Japanese Army invaded the country in December 1941, the combined US and Filipino forces were being gradually overrun and General Douglas MacArthur moved his troops to the Bataan Peninsula in an attempt to hold out until a relief force could be sent from the US. Japanese forces started a siege of the peninsula on 7 January 1942, and launched an all-out assault on 3 April, a few months after the Battle of the Points, Battle of the Pockets, the attack down Trail Number Two, and a half-dozen other brutal battles. The Bataan campaign was the last time a regular cavalry unit of the U.S. Army, the Philippine Scouts 26th Cavalry, was used as a horse mounted fighting unit. On the morning of 16 January 1942, Lt. Edwin Ramsey led the last cavalry charge into the town of Morong, routing the advancing Japanese infantry. As the troops on Bataan were continually reduced in rations, the horses were eventually slaughtered to feed the starving soldiers.

The majority of the American and Filipino forces surrendered on 9 April and were forced to march more than 100 kilometers (62 mi) from Bataan to Capas, Tarlac, which became known as the Bataan Death March.

=== Postwar era ===
Postwar reconstruction in the province of Bataan was generally slow, although there were efforts to pursue industrialization projects in the area, most notably the establishment of the NASSCO (National Shipyard and Steel Corporation) in Mariveles which was inaugurated in 1953 during the Quirino administration. It would later be bought by the Bataan Shipping and Engineering Company in 1964.

=== Martial law era ===
The beginning months of the 1970s marked a period of turmoil and change in the Philippines, as well as in Bataan. During his bid to be the first Philippine president to be re-elected for a second term, Ferdinand Marcos launched an unprecedented number of foreign debt-funded public works projects. This caused the Philippine economy to take a sudden downwards turn known as the 1969 Philippine balance of payments crisis, which in turn led to a period of economic difficulty and a significant rise of social unrest.

Just as this was happening, it was revealed that the site of two communities where the workers of NASSCO lived - Barrio NASSCO and Barrio Camaya - would be torn down for conversion into the new Bataan Export Processing Zone (BEPZ) in 1969, compelling the relocation of the residents who in turn launched protests until the BEPZ was finally built in 1972.

With only a year left in his last constitutionally allowed term as president, Ferdinand Marcos placed the Philippines under Martial Law in September 1972 and thus retained the position for fourteen more years. This period in Philippine history is remembered for the Marcos administration's record of human rights abuses, particularly targeting political opponents, student activists, journalists, religious workers, farmers, and others who fought against the Marcos dictatorship.

By this time, the social unrest of the pre-martial law period and the Marcos' violent responses to the protests of the time led many of the Philippines' youth, who previously held moderate positions calling for political reform, to be radicalized. Some were convinced to joined the newly-formed New People's Army as a last desperate way to resist Marcos' authoritarianism, including Catalino Blas, Amado Bugay, and Delia Cortez, who were all idealistic activists killed in encounters with Marcos' forces in various locations in Bataan. But many noncombatants were killed as well, such as Social Worker and Catholic lay worker Puri Pedro, who had been wounded as part of the collateral damage during one encounter in 1977, but was assassinated in cold blood by a soldier who identified himself as Col. Rolando Abadilla while she was recovering at the Bataan Provincial Hospital.

It was also during Martial Law that construction on the Bataan Nuclear Power Plant began in Morong, in 1976. Marcos had announced an intention to build a nuclear power plant in July 1973, not long after the declaration of Martial Law, and a presidential committee was set up to review proposals, of which there were two - one each from General Electric and Westinghouse Electric. The committee preferred the proposal of General Electric's bid although it cost more, because it contained detailed specifications for the plant. But Marcos, in a deal brokered by crony Herminio Disini, overrode then and signed a letter of intent awarding the project to Westinghouse, despite the absence of any specifications on their proposal. The project was plagued with problems throughout construction, including location, welding, cabling, pipes and valves, permits, and kickbacks, as well as setbacks such as the decline of Marcos's influence due to bad health and PR fallout from the incident at the Three Mile Island nuclear reactor. A subsequent safety inquiry into the plant revealed over 4,000 defects. Another issue raised regarding it was the proximity of a major geological fault line and of the then-dormant Mount Pinatubo. By March 1975, Westinghouse's cost estimate ballooned to US$1.2 billion without much explanation. The final cost was $2.2 Billion for a single reactor producing half the power of the original proposal. Many problems identified in earlier stages remained throughout construction, as reported by inspectors though denied by Westinghouse. The power plant was responsible for generating 10% of the country's external debt, despite never actually operating.

=== Contemporary era ===
During the tenure of Governor Albert Garcia, 1Bataan started to be used as the province's identity and logo on 8 November 2013 where its Facebook page was launched now serving as an account of the provincial government.

On 14 March 2020, Bataan recorded one of the earliest cases of COVID-19 infection outside of Metro Manila, with a male patient from Orani being the 64th recorded case in the Philippines. Bataan later became one of the provinces under the Enhanced community quarantine in Luzon.

== Geography ==
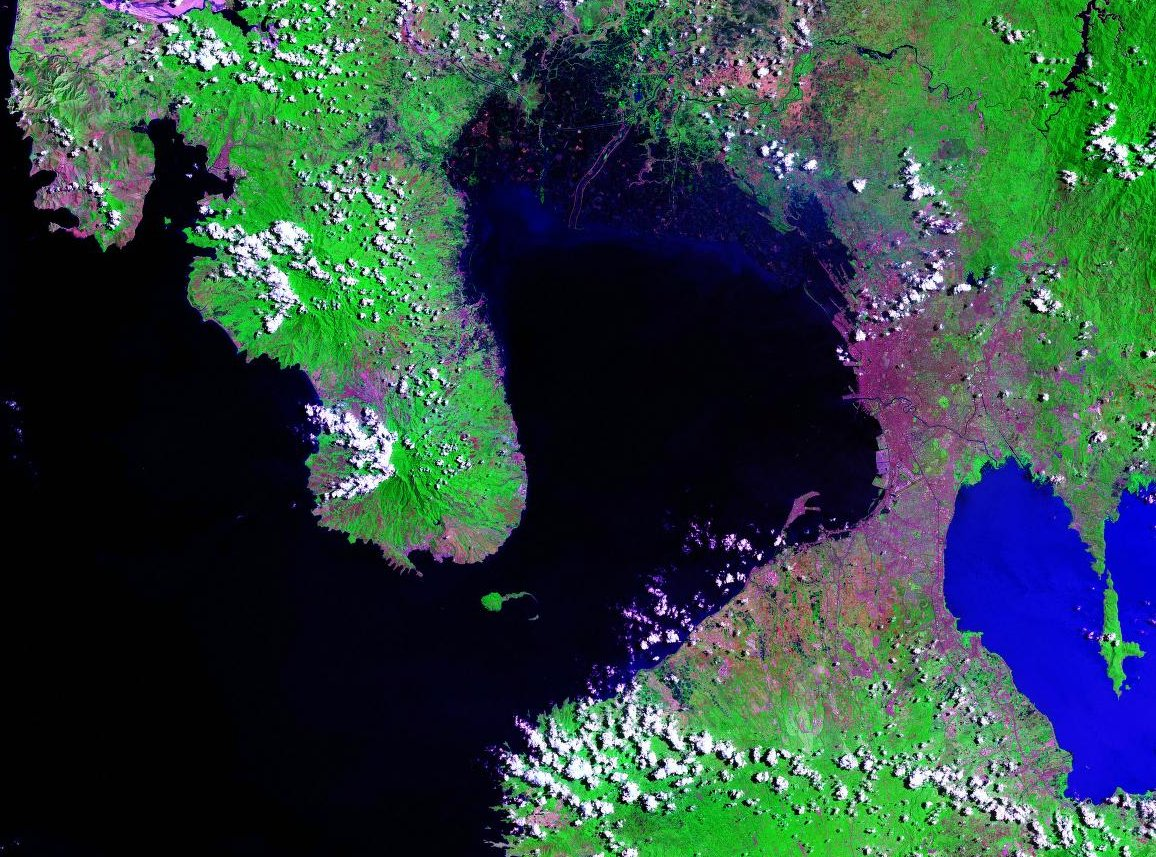
Bataan peninsula's strategic location in the west of Manila Bay, directly across Metro Manila

Bataan lies in the southwestern part of the Central Luzon region. It is a peninsular province with an area of 1,372.98 square kilometers (530.11 sq mi). The province is bounded in the west by the South China Sea, in the south by the Corregidor Island, and in the east by Manila Bay - the gateway to the Philippines' political, social and economic center. It is bounded inland by the city of Olongapo in the north and by the provinces of Pampanga and Bulacan in the northeast. Its capital, the City of Balanga, is about 31.3 nautical miles from Manila across Manila Bay.

=== Topography ===
Bataan, a peninsula, is composed of 11 municipalities and one city. All except the northernmost municipality of Dinalupihan, are coastal areas. The province's coastline is approximately 177 kilometers from Hermosa in the northeastern portion of the province, looping up to Morong in the northwest.

Bataan is divided by two mountain groups of volcanic origins. The northern side is composed of the Mount Natib (elevation 1,253 meters (4,111 ft)), Mount Sta. Rosa and Mount Silangan. The southern group is composed of Mount Mariveles, Mount Samat, and Mount Cuyapo. A narrow pass separates these two mountain groups. The topography of the province is classified generally as hilly and mountainous with a narrow plain on the eastern side. The highest elevation is in the Mariveles mountains at 1,388 meters above sea level.

Bataan has abundant water resources in the form of rivers, streams, creeks, waterfalls and springs. There are more than 100 rivers in the province radiating from the two aforementioned mountain groups. These are important not only for irrigation but also for navigation and fishing as well. The Talisay and Almacen Rivers are the two major rivers in the province. Talisay has its headwater in the Mariveles mountain group extending down to Pilar and Balanga into Manila Bay. Almacen River has its headwater in the Natib mountains extending down to Hermosa and exits through the Orani Channel to Manila Bay. Some of the smaller rivers are Abo-abo River, Bantalan River, Lamao River, Saysayin River, Agloloma River, Mamala River.

=== Coastline ===
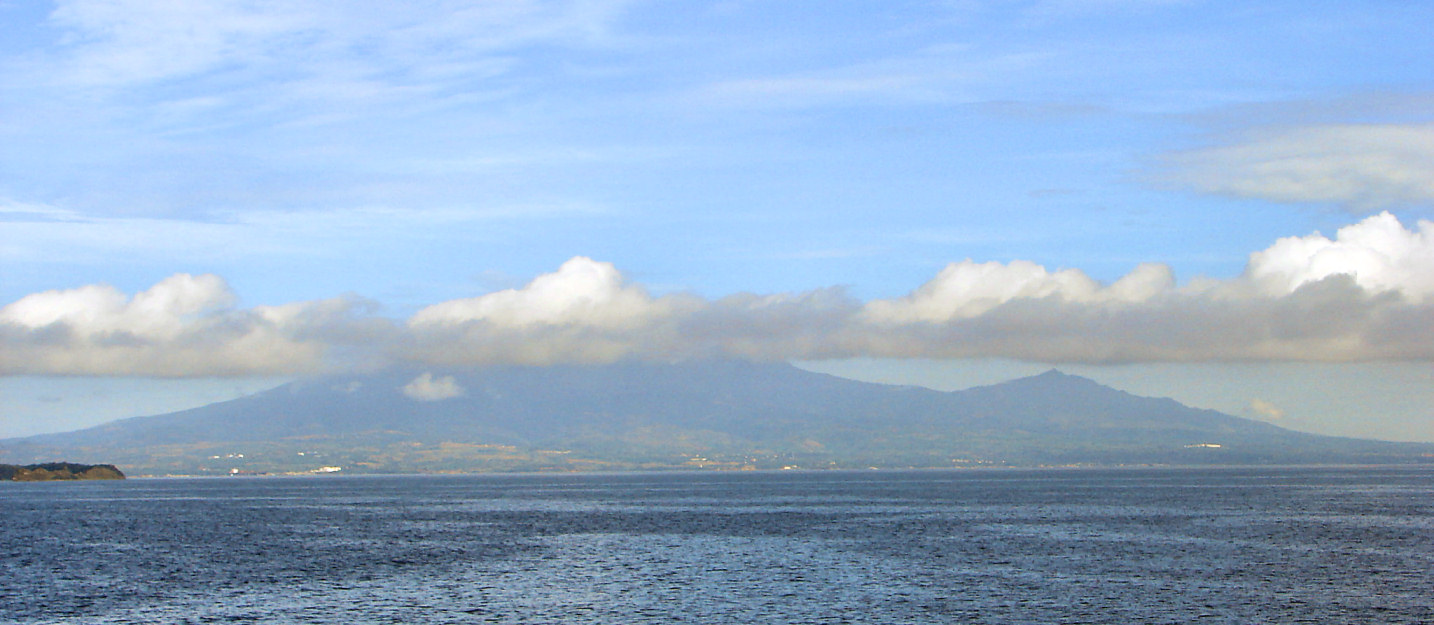
Bataan as seen from the entrance of Manila Bay

Muddy tidal flats along the alluvial sandbars characterize the coastline along Manila Bay. Mangrove areas can be observed from Orani to Orion, along with seaweed areas and seagrass patches areas from portions of Balanga and Pilar down to Mariveles. The deeper portions are the coastal areas of Orion to Mariveles where most seaports are operating. Poor coral reef patches, mixed with sandy-rocky bottom can be found in Mariveles area, where the coastline begin to take on a rocky character looping from the mouth of Manila Bay to the western side of the province. The coastline facing the South China Sea is interspersed with pristine beaches with rocky portions and fringes of coral reef in good condition from Bagac to Morong, which is a haven for sea turtles and other marine animals.

=== Climate ===
Bataan has distinct dry and wet seasons categorized as Type I in the Philippines' Modified Coronas' Climate Classification (Climate of the Philippines). The dry season begins in November and ends in April, while the rainy season starts in May and ends in October. The most rains come in June to August. Mean average rainfall in August is the heaviest at 633mm. Bataan is often visited by typhoons. Farming systems in the province follow these climatic cycles.

== Administrative divisions ==
Bataan is administratively subdivided into 11 municipalities and one component city.

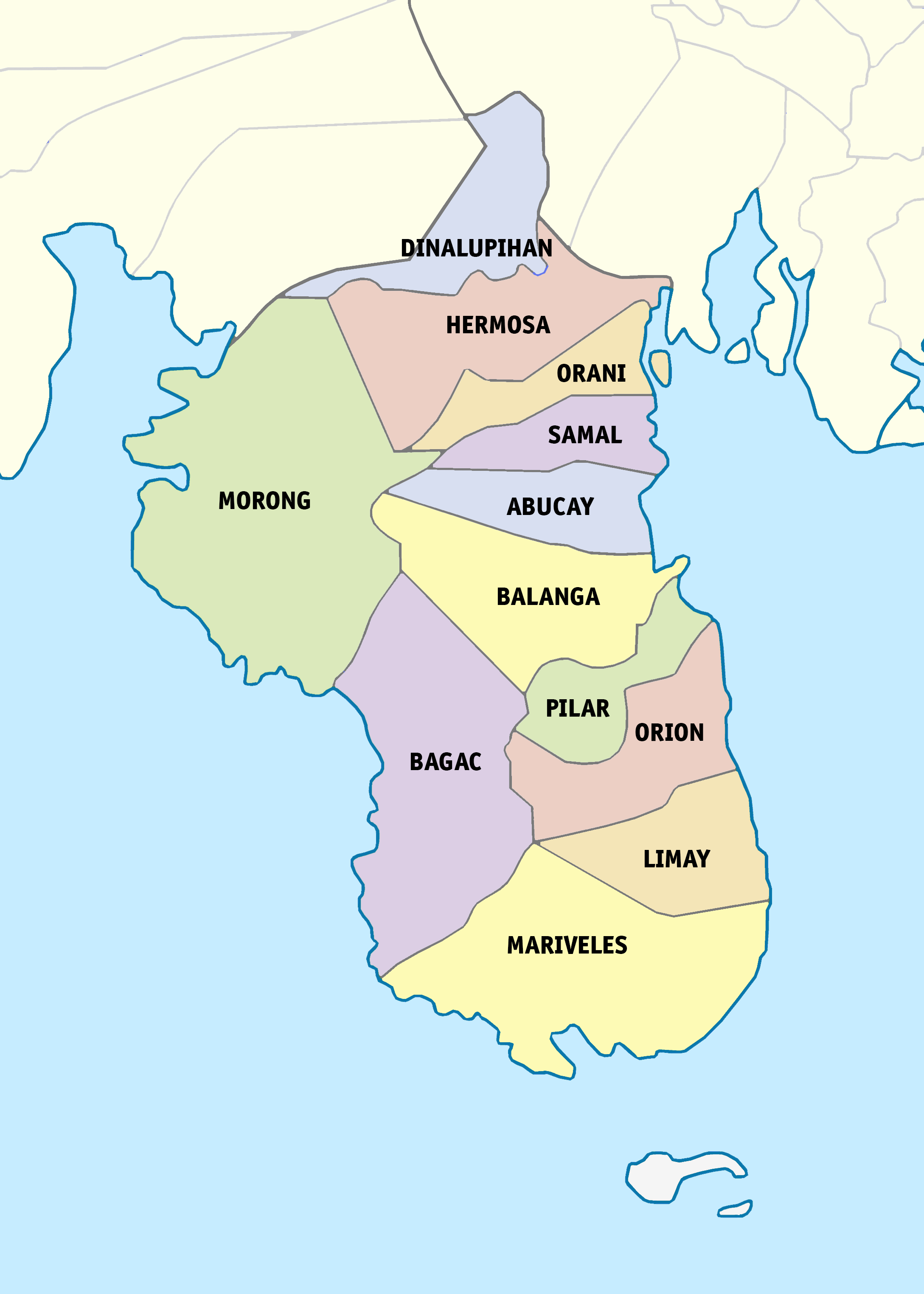
Political map of Bataan

- † Provincial capital and component city
- Municipality

City or municipality		District	Population			±% p.a.	Area		Density		Barangay	Coordinates^{[A]}
			(2020)		(2015)		km^{2}	sq mi	/km^{2}	/sq mi		
Abucay		1st	5.0%	42,984	39,880	+1.44%	79.72	30.78	540	1,400	9	14°43′17″N 120°32′05″E
Bagac		3rd	3.7%	31,365	26,936	+2.94%	231.20	89.27	140	360	14	14°35′48″N 120°23′32″E
Balanga	†	2nd	12.2%	104,173	96,061	+1.56%	111.63	43.10	930	2,400	25	14°40′46″N 120°32′27″E
Dinalupihan		3rd	13.9%	118,209	106,371	+2.03%	92.52	35.72	1,300	3,400	46	14°51′59″N 120°27′47″E
Hermosa		1st	9.1%	77,443	65,862	+3.13%	157.00	60.62	490	1,300	23	14°49′52″N 120°30′27″E
Limay		2nd	9.2%	78,272	68,071	+2.69%	103.60	40.00	760	2,000	12	14°33′45″N 120°35′42″E
Mariveles		3rd	17.6%	149,879	127,536	+3.12%	153.90	59.42	970	2,500	18	14°26′08″N 120°29′25″E
Morong		3rd	4.1%	35,394	29,901	+3.26%	219.20	84.63	160	410	5	14°40′40″N 120°15′55″E
Orani		1st	8.2%	70,342	66,909	+0.96%	64.90	25.06	1,100	2,800	29	14°48′03″N 120°32′12″E
Orion		2nd	7.1%	60,771	56,002	+1.57%	65.41	25.25	930	2,400	23	14°37′11″N 120°34′49″E
Pilar		2nd	5.4%	46,239	41,823	+1.93%	37.60	14.52	1,200	3,100	19	14°40′01″N 120°33′10″E
Samal		1st	4.5%	38,302	35,298	+1.57%	56.30	21.74	680	1,800	14	14°46′09″N 120°32′32″E
Total				853,373	760,650	+2.21%	1,372.98	530.11	620	1,600	237	(see GeoGroup box)
1. Coordinates mark the city/town center, and are sortable by latitude.

=== Income classification ===
Republic Act (RA) No. 11964, otherwise known as the "Automatic Income Classification of Local Government Units Act", was signed by President Bongbong Marcos on 26 October 2023. The law classifies municipalities and cities into five (5) classes, according to their income ranges, based on the average annual regular income for three fiscal years preceding a general income reclassification. The classifications are as follows:

Updated Income Classification for Cities

Cl	Average annual income ₱
First	> 1,300,000,000
Second	1,000,000,000 – 1,300,000,000
Third	800,000,000 – 1,000,000,000
Fourth	500,000,000 – 800,000,000
Fifth	< 500,000,000

Updated Income Classification for Municipalities

Cl	Average annual income ₱
First	> 200,000,000
Second	160,000,000 – 200,000,000
Third	130,000,000 – 160,000,000
Fourth	90,000,000 – 130,000,000
Fifth	< 90,000,000

- City of Balanga - 2nd class Component City (upgraded from 4th class)
- Abucay - 2nd class Municipality (upgraded from 3rd class)
- Bagac - 2nd class Municipality (upgraded from 3rd class)
- Dinalupihan - 1st class Municipality (retains its previous classification)
- Hermosa - 1st class Municipality (retains its previous classification)
- Limay - 1st class Municipality (retains its previous classification)
- Mariveles - 1st class Municipality (retains its previous classification)
- Morong - 1st class Municipality (upgraded from 3rd class)
- Orani - 1st class Municipality (retains its previous classification)
- Orion - 1st class Municipality (upgraded from 2nd class)
- Pilar - 2nd class Municipality (upgraded from 3rd class)
- Samal - 2nd class Municipality (upgraded from 4th class)

== Demographics ==
Population census of Bataan

Year	Pop.	±% p.a.
1903	46,787	—
1918	58,340	+1.48%
1939	85,538	+1.84%
1948	92,901	+0.92%
1960	145,323	+3.80%
1970	216,210	+4.05%

Year	Pop.	±% p.a.
1975	263,269	+4.03%
1980	323,254	+4.19%
1990	425,803	+2.79%
1995	491,459	+2.72%
2000	557,659	+2.75%
2007	662,153	+2.40%

Year	Pop.	±% p.a.
2010	687,482	+1.38%
2015	760,650	+1.94%
2020	853,373	+2.45%
2024	891,440	+1.05%

Source: Philippine Statistics Authority

The population of Bataan in the 2024 census was 891,440 people, with a density of 650 inhabitants per square kilometer or 1,700 inhabitants per square mile. The demonym for natives of the province is Bataeño.

=== Languages ===
Tagalog and English are two of the predominant languages spoken in the province, as are the Philippines as a whole. The Tagalogs and Kapampangans speak both of these with their respective accents. Kapampangan is spoken in towns near the boundary with Pampanga, specifically Dinalupihan, Hermosa, and Orani. Ilocano is spoken by descendants of Ilocano settlers in southeastern areas, specifically Orion, Limay, and Mariveles.

=== Ethnicity ===
The three most prominent ethnic groups in Bataan are the Tagalogs, the Kapampangans and the Ayta Magbeken, though the third group has a lower population despite being the province's first inhabitants. The second group is mainly present at the northeast of the province, as well as in the provincial capital to a lesser extent. Some Bataeños are descendants of Ilocano settlers. Non-native residents in Bataan include Pangasinans, Bicolanos, several Cordillera tribes, Cebuanos, Hiligaynons, Maranaos, Maguindanaons and Tausugs.

=== Religion ===
==== Catholicism ====
Roman Catholicism is the predominant religion, comprising 85.46% of the Bataan population.

==== Others ====
Various religious groups are present in the province, which include the second majority religion in the province Iglesia Ni Cristo (5.1%), Members Church of God International (MCGI), Evangelicals (2.06%), Aglipayans (1.60%), and others.

=== Human development ===
Bataan is amongst the provinces in the Philippines with high Human Development Index. The 2015 HDI of the province is 0.793.

Poverty incidence of Bataan (%)

Source: Philippine Statistics Authority

== Government ==
Current Provincial Government Officials (2025-2028)

- Governor: Jose Enrique S. Garcia (PFP)
- Vice-Governor: Ma. Cristina M. Garcia (PFP)

Sangguniang Panlalawigan Members

1st District

- Jomar L. Gaza (PFP)
- Mylene A. Serrano (Nacionalista)
- Godofredo B. Galicia Jr. (PFP)

2nd District

- Maria Margarita R. Roque (PFP)
- Noel Joseph L. Valdecañas (PFP)
- Victor A. Baluyot Jr. (PFP)

3rd District

- Romano L. Del Rosario (Nacionalista)
- Angelito M. Sunga (Nacionalista)
- Jorge S. Estanislao (NUP)
- Roman Harold R. Espeleta (NUP)

Ex-Officio Members

- Romeo Austria (President, Liga ng mga Barangay)
- Jovy Z. Banzon (President, PCL)
- Lovely Joy Poblete (President, Panlalawigang Pederasyon ng Sangguniang Kabataan)
- Feliciano Magay (Representative, IPMR)

== House of Representatives ==
District	Representative	Party	Term	Bloc
1st	Antonino B. Roman III	Lakas	1	Majority
2nd	Albert S. Garcia	NUP	2	Majority
3rd	Maria Angela S. Garcia	NUP	2	Majority

== Economy ==
=== Economic significance ===
Bataan is one of the most progressive provinces of Luzon and Manila Bay Region, and a key contributor to the region's overall economic productivity. Its 2024 Provincial Product Account (PPA) also known as Provincial GDP (Gross Domestic Product) stands at PhP300-billion. It registered a growth rate of 9.3% which is the fastest in Central Luzon region. Also, the Philippine Statistics Authority estimates that Bataan leads all other provinces in the Philippines in terms of per capita GDP at PhP 337,218. The 2024 per capita GDP is derived by dividing the GDP of the province/ HUC by its total population based on the 2024 Census of Population (2024 POPCEN). The province is strategically located right in the middle of the country's growth triad corridor of Subic Special Economic and Freeport Zone, Clark Freeport and Special Economic Zone and Metro Manila. It is one of the Philippines' industrial centers owing to the presence of heavy industries, two freeport zones and several special manufacturing zones. Due to these factors plus the province's competitive incentives offered to new business locators, the Philippine Chamber of Commerce and Industry adjudged Bataan as the most business friendly province in the country during the 49th Philippine Business Conference Expo held last 25 and 26 October 2023. This is the third time the province had received such recognition, the first one was in 2018, while the second in 2021.

In 2020, Bataan registered the third highest locally sourced income among all the provinces in the Philippines as certified by the Department of Finance - Bureau of Local Government Finance (BLGF).

=== Industries and manufacturing ===
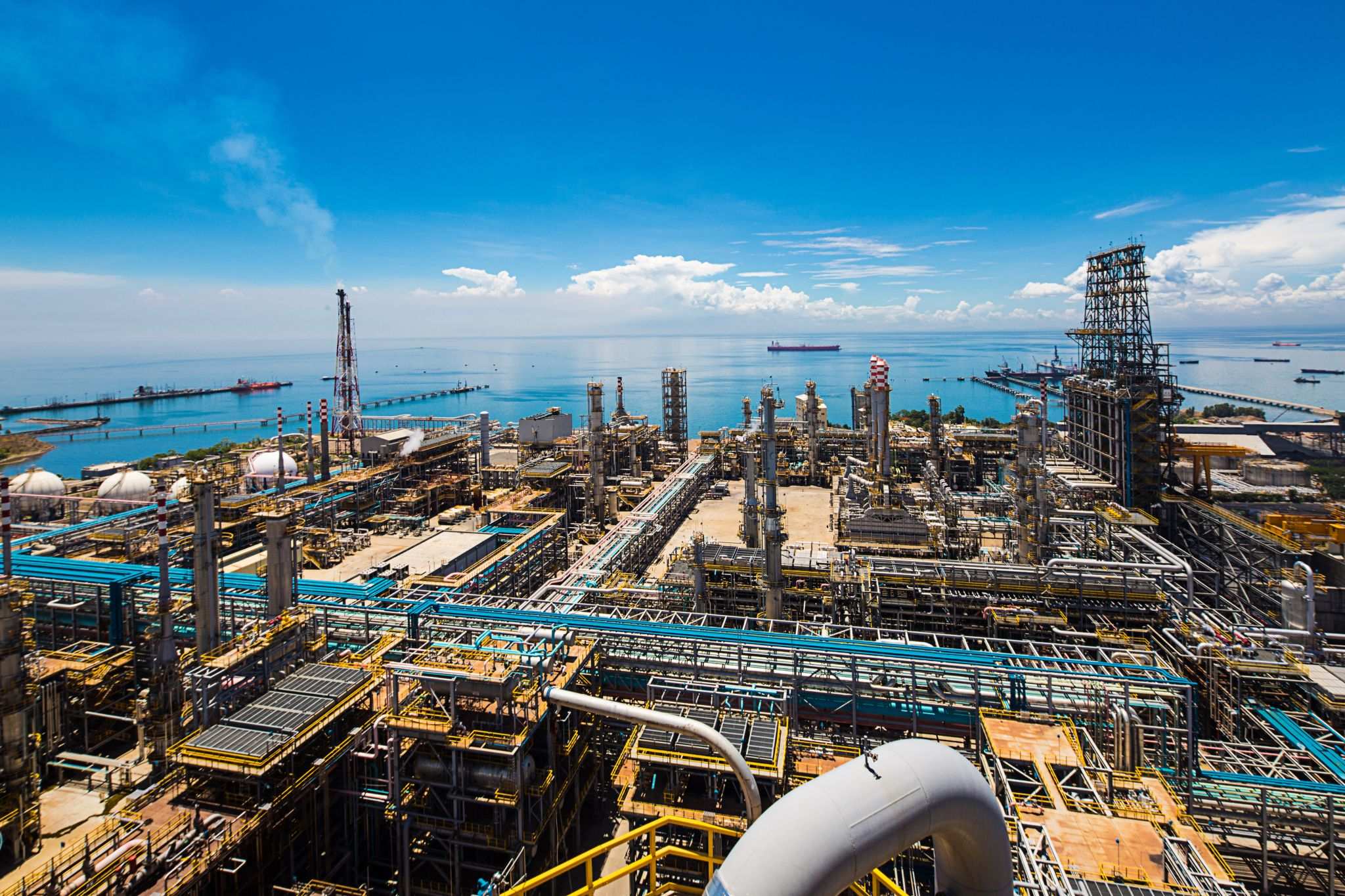
The 180,000 bpsd Petron Bataan Refinery in Limay, Bataan is a full conversion refinery and the sole integrated oil refinery and petrochemical complex in the Philippines

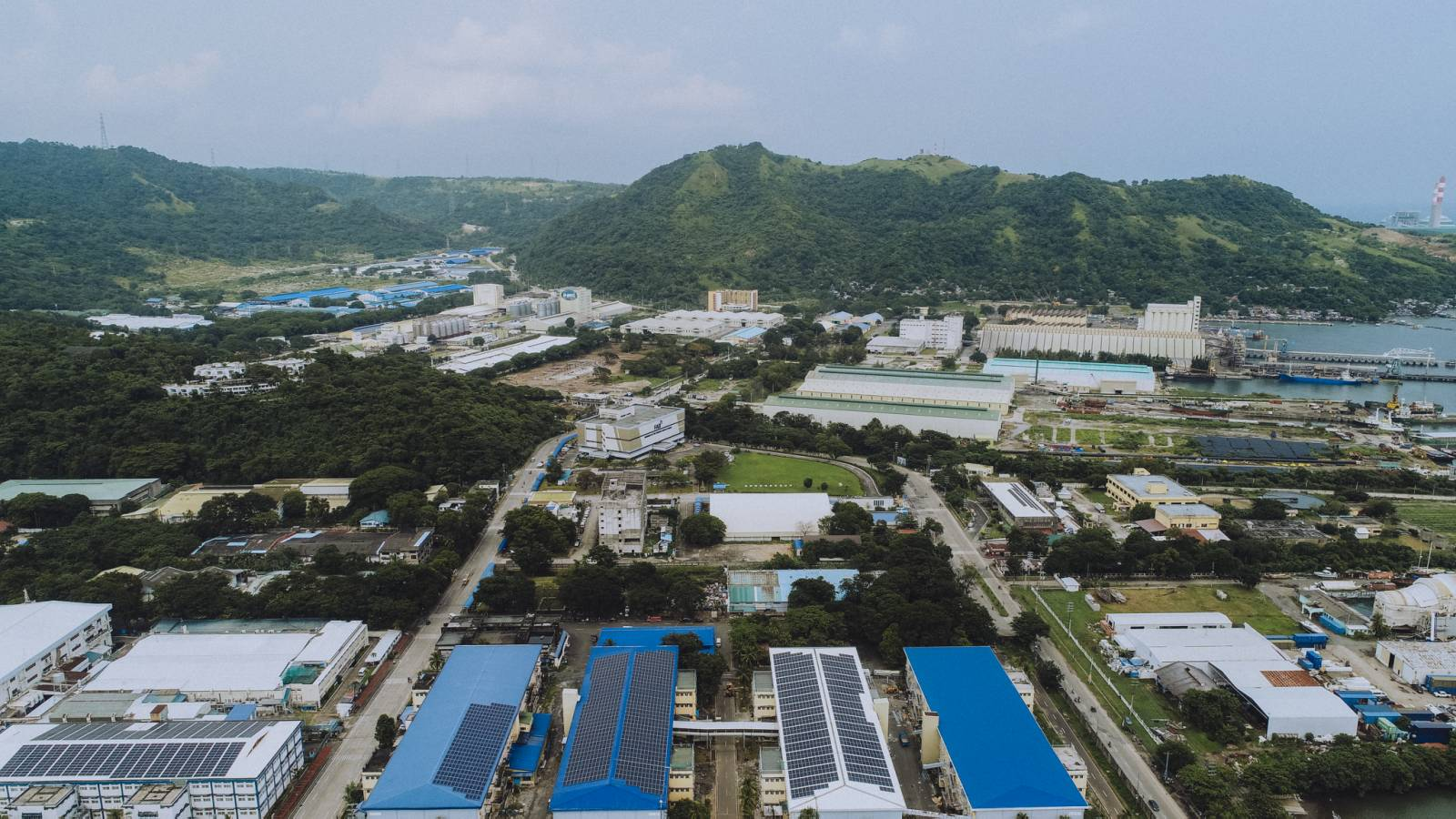
The Freeport Area of Bataan, formerly known as Mariveles Free Trade Zone (June 21, 1969 – November 20, 1972), and Bataan Export Processing Zone/Bataan Economic Zone (November 20, 1972 – July 2010), is the fastest growing freeport in the country in terms of investments

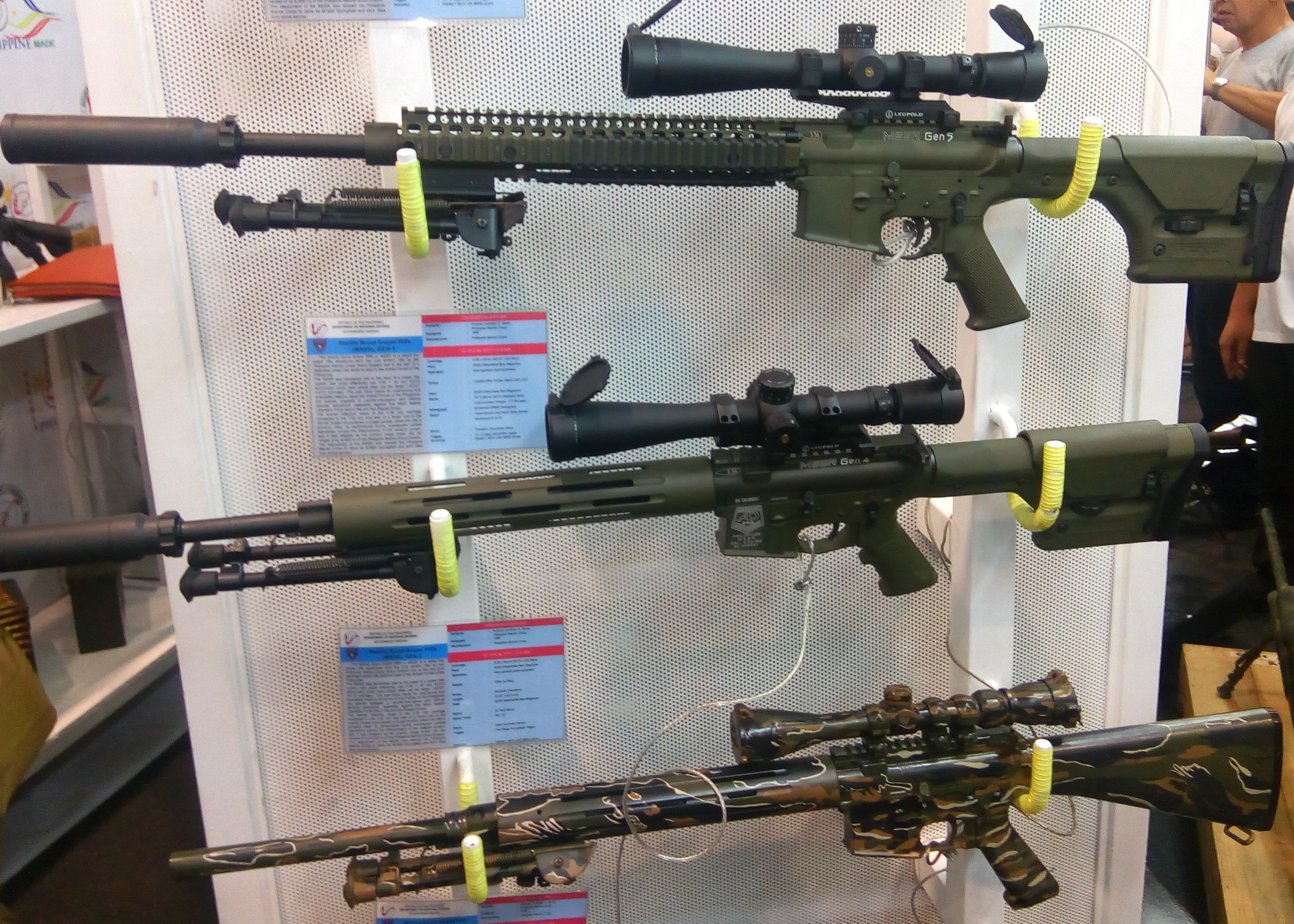
Government Arsenal made sniper rifles on display

Bataan hosts various industries, ranging from light to heavy. These industries are producing diverse products for domestic distribution and export such as refined petroleum products, petrochemicals, ammunitions, industrial grade explosives, marine cargo vessels, luxury yachts, pre-cast concrete, cement, steel building materials, animal feeds, fertilizers, fiberglass products, electronic components, automotive parts, medical personal protective equipment, paper, plastic products, optical lenses, textile and leather products, and sporting goods and apparels. Industrial productions account to 64% of the province's GDP valued at PhP192.41-billion as of 2024.

The largest industrial complexes operating in the province are listed below.

- Petron Bataan Refinery or PBR (Limay) - is the only integrated oil refinery and petrochemical complex in the Philippines with rated capacity of 180,000 barrels per stream day (bpsd), capable of supplying approximately 40% of the country's total fuel requirements. In 2016, PBR commissioned its $2-Billion Upgrade Project dubbed the Refinery Master Plan Phase 2 (RMP-2). It is a full conversion refinery capable of processing crude oil into a range of white petroleum products such as naphtha, gasoline, diesel, liquified petroleum gas, jet fuel, kerosene, and petrochemical feedstock such as benzene, toluene, mixed xylene and propylene. It also made Petron capable of locally producing fuels that meet global Euro IV and Euro VI emission standards. It has a Nelson Complexity Index of 13 making it among the most modern and complex refineries in Asia
- Philippine National Oil Corporation (PNOC) Industrial Park (Limay and Mariveles) - previously known as PNOC-Philippine Petrochemical Development Complex, it is one of the largest industrial complexes in the province housing various petrochemical manufacturers producing polyvinyl chloride (PVC), polyethylene (PE), and polypropylene (PP); and industrial explosives manufacturer Orica Philippines.
- The Freeport Area of Bataan (FAB) (Mariveles) - is formerly known as Mariveles Free Trade Zone from 21 June 1969 to 20 November 1972, and Bataan Export Processing Zone (BEPZ) and Bataan Economic Zone (BEZ) from 20 November 1972 to July 2010 under Philippine Economic Zone Authority (PEZA). This was later amended on 30 August 2019, through Republic Act 11453, giving powers to the freeport to expand its territory anywhere within the bounds of the province Bataan except the Hermosa and Morong portions of Subic Special Economic and Freeport Zone which is under Subic Bay Metropolitan Authority (SBMA), another freeport zone located within the province. It is operated and managed by AFAB, a government agency under the Office of the President of the Philippines, since the effectivity of RA 9728 in July 2010 that turned over the zone from PEZA, converted BEPZ/BEZ to FAB, and abolished the said names. FAB is the third largest freeport zone in the country based in the number of investors and employment created, behind Clark Freeport and Subic Freeport. Currently, there are 95 companies operating in the freeport with half of these engaging in manufacturing and employing roughly 40,000 personnels and producing various products such as leather goods, electronics, textile, rubber and plastic products, medical PPE, fabricated metals, animal feeds, marine vessels and lenses. The total annual export value for these products reached more than US$1.05-billion in 2023. Dunlop Slazenger Philippines Inc., a locator in this freeport, specially takes pride as the exclusive producer of tennis balls used in The Championships, Wimbledon. FAB is also an emerging hub for fintech and blockchain businesses hosting a number of these companies.
- Government Arsenal (Limay) - is an agency of the Philippine government under the Department of National Defense, responsible for the production of basic weaponry and ammunition for the Armed Forces of the Philippines (AFP), and the Philippine National Police (PNP), among others, and for the sale and export of products in excess of AFP/PNP requirements. On 27 June 2022, the Department of National Defense (Philippines) signed an agreement with the Authority of the Freeport Area of Bataan to set-up the country's first Defense Industry Economic Zone.
- Hermosa Ecozone and Industrial Park (Hermosa) - or shortened as HEIP is a 162-hectares industrial estate component of a 478-hectare mixed-use property development in the province of Bataan by the Hermosa Ecozone Development Corporation an arm of the Science Park of the Philippines, Incorporated. The project is a registered Special Economic Zone (Ecozone) under the Philippine Economic Zone Authority (PEZA).
- Bataan 2020, Inc. (Samal) - Bataan 2020 is a leading manufacturer of fine quality paper, board and tissue in the Philippines. The company is among the most diversified paper mills in the industry, with a capacity of over 100,000 metric tons of paper annually.
- Subic Special Economic and Freeport Zone - commonly shortened as Subic Bay, Subic Freeport, or Subic (but should not be mistaken for the municipality of Subic, Zambales), is a special economic and freeport zone covering portions of Olongapo and Subic in Zambales, and Morong and Hermosa in Bataan. It is operated and managed by Subic Bay Metropolitan Authority (SBMA). The relatively developed and fenced area is called the Subic Bay Freeport Zone (SBFZ). This was the only freeport zone in Bataan from 13 March 1992 until the conversion of Bataan Export Processing Zone (BEPZ)/Bataan Economic Zone (BEZ) into Freeport Area of Bataan (FAB) in Mariveles in July 2010.
- Bataan Technology Park Inc. (Morong) - the 365-hectare property, is once the site of the Philippine Refugee Processing Center, which offered shelter to some 400,000 refugees from Vietnam, Laos and Cambodia. The property is now administered by Bases Conversion and Development Authority and is planned for an industrial and tourism development.
- Tipo Hightech Eco Park (Hermosa) - or shortened as THEP is a 209-hectare mixed-use development located inside Subic Bay Freeport Zone expansion area straddling the municipality of Hermosa in Bataan and City of Olongapo. THEP development will include 101.47 hectares for light industries, 17.99 hectares for a commercial complex, 7.11 hectares for mixed use, 23.16 hectares for residential buildings, and 23.16 hectares for a nature and environment conservation park.
- Bataan Harbor City (Pilar) - is a 75.5-hectare mixed-use development with a neighboring port facility that is currently being built in the town of Pilar.

Bataan is also a strategic transport route and transshipment point linking the Subic Special Economic and Freeport Zone and the rest of the western part of Central Luzon region to Metro Manila. Several private ports, dry docks and ship yards, and oil terminals are operating along its long eastern coast facing Manila Bay. Among these are San Miguel Corporation Shipping and Lighterage, Petron Corporation Limay Terminal, PNOC jetty, Planters Products Inc. Bulk Handling Terminal, Seasia-Nectar Terminal, Oilink Terminal, Jetti Petroleum Terminal, Orion Dockyard, Herma Shipyard, Seafront Terminal and Shipyard, Liquigaz Philippines LPG Terminal and Filoil/Total Philippines Terminal.

=== Agriculture and fisheries ===
Agriculture and fishery productions are major sources of income for the people of Bataan. Productions range from crops, fruits, fish, shellfish and other marine species. About 44,000 hectares of land are utilized for farming. The top five agricultural crops produced by the province are palay (rice), corn, coconuts, mangoes and bananas. The municipalities of Dinalupihan, Hermosa, Orani, Samal, Abucay, Pilar and Orion are the main contributors for agricultural output of the Province.

==== Poultry production ====
Bataan is frequently included in the top ten poultry and poultry product producers in the country, it hosts modern poultry dressing and processing plants owned by San Miguel Corporation and Bounty Fresh Chicken. Currently, San Miguel Food and Beverage is building a $100-million mega-poultry facility that can house 80-million birds in Brgy. Lucanin, Mariveles.

==== Fisheries ====
Being a peninsula, Bataan is one of the major sources of various marine products in Luzon, that include good quality tilapia, bangus (milkfish), tiger prawns, mud crabs, and bivalves such as mussels, oysters and capiz shells.

=== Commerce and services ===
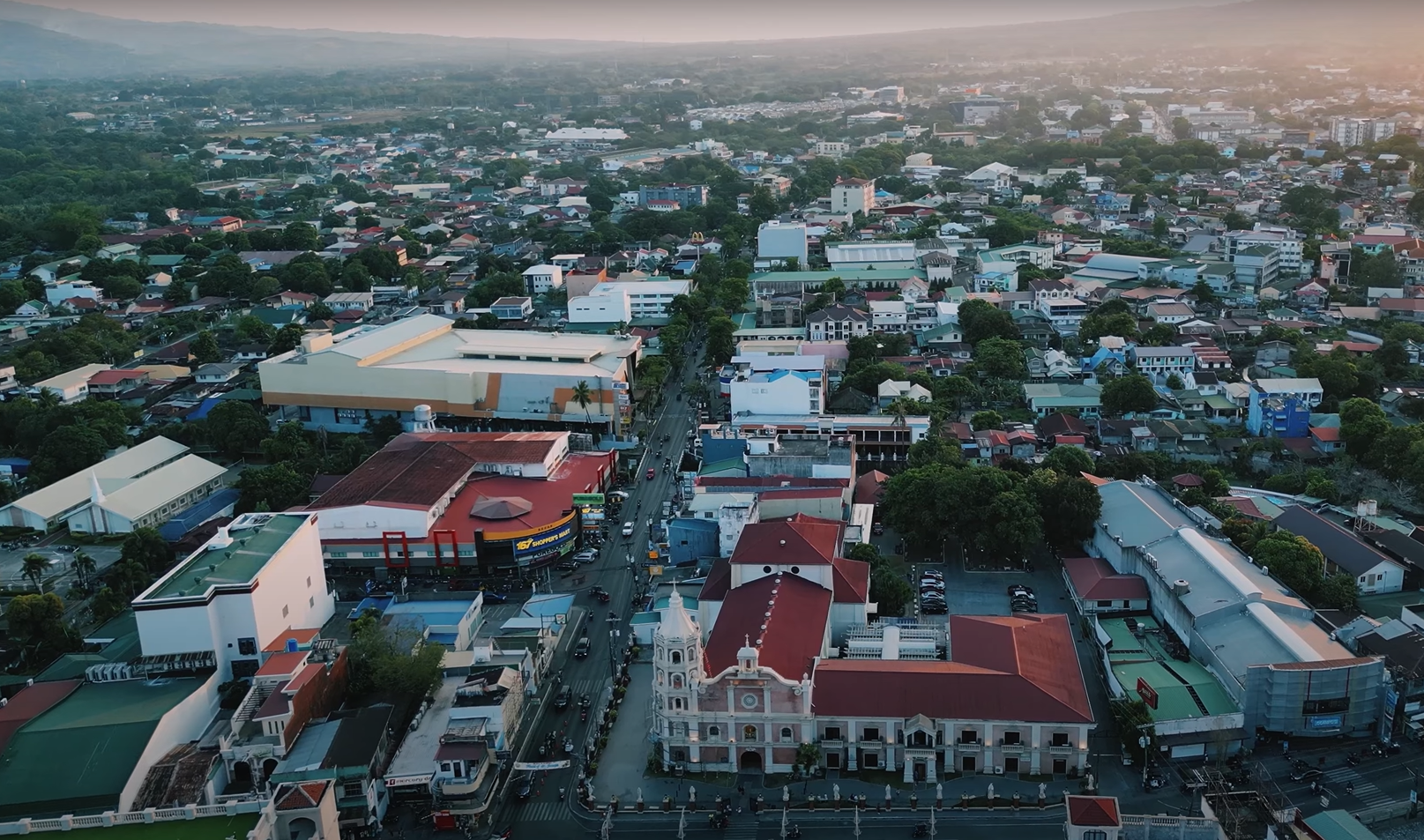
The Capitol Drive in Balanga is one of the busy commercial zones in the province.

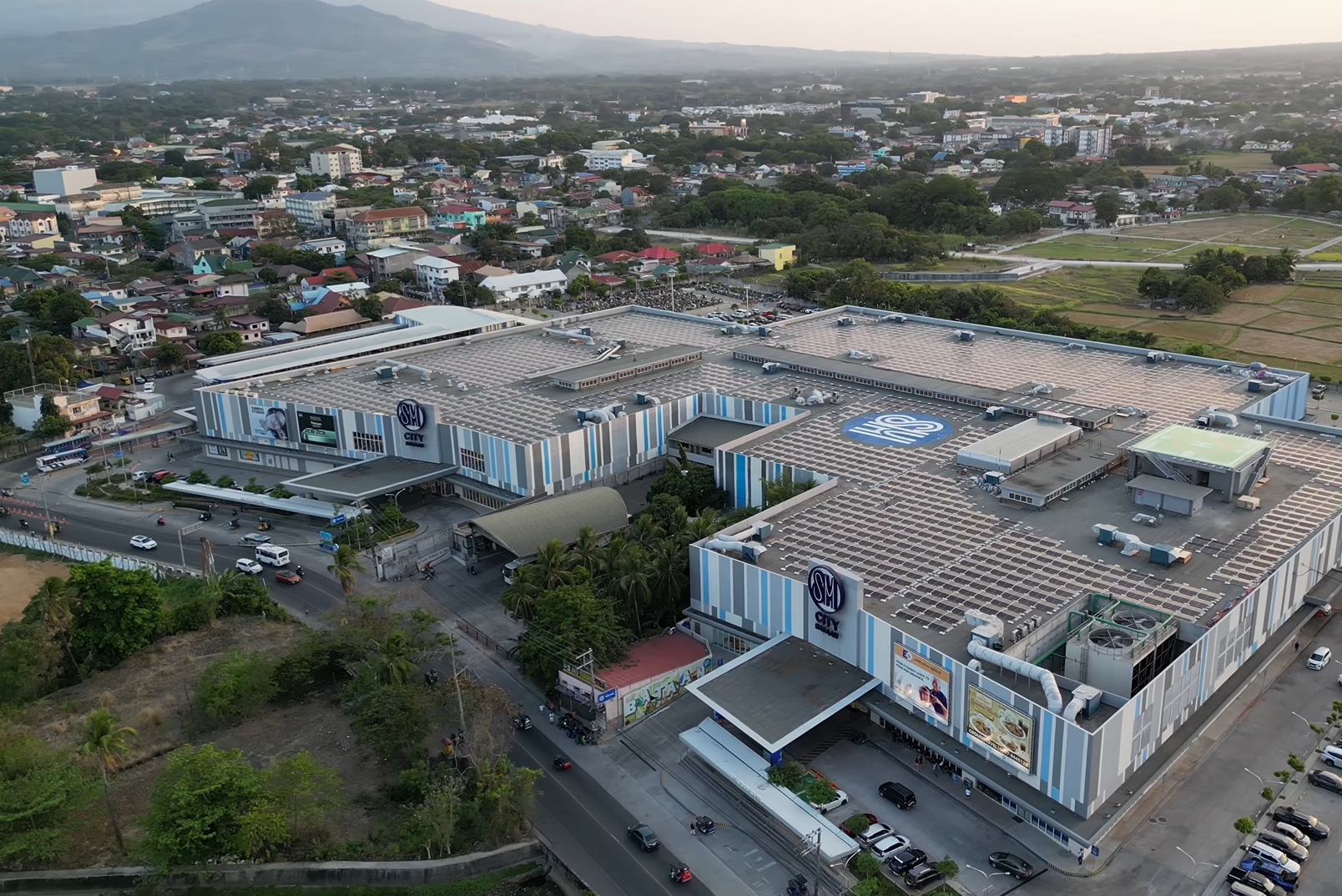
The SM City Bataan is one of the primary shopping centers located in the City of Balanga.

Bataan is in a process of accelerated growth in commercial sector driven mainly by young entrepreneurs and the advent of online commerce. Based from the Philippine Statistics Authority, commerce and services account to 32.7%, equivalent to PhP 98.42-billion, of the province's economy. In addition, more than 10,000 micro, small and medium enterprises (MSME) are operating in the province. With an average of 126 enterprises available per 10,000 people, Bataan is considered as the most enterprising province in Central Luzon.

The City of Balanga, the capital of Bataan, is the prime commercial hub in the province and hosting several shopping centers notably SM City Bataan, Vista Mall Bataan, Waltermart Balanga, Capitol Square, Galeria Victoria, Center Plaza Mall, Recar Commercial Complex and Ocampo's Megastore. The municipalities of Morong, Dinalupihan, Hermosa, Orani, Mariveles and Orion are considered as secondary commercial hubs. The rest of the municipalities have established smaller business district enough to support the local demand.

==== Information technology and business process outsourcing ====
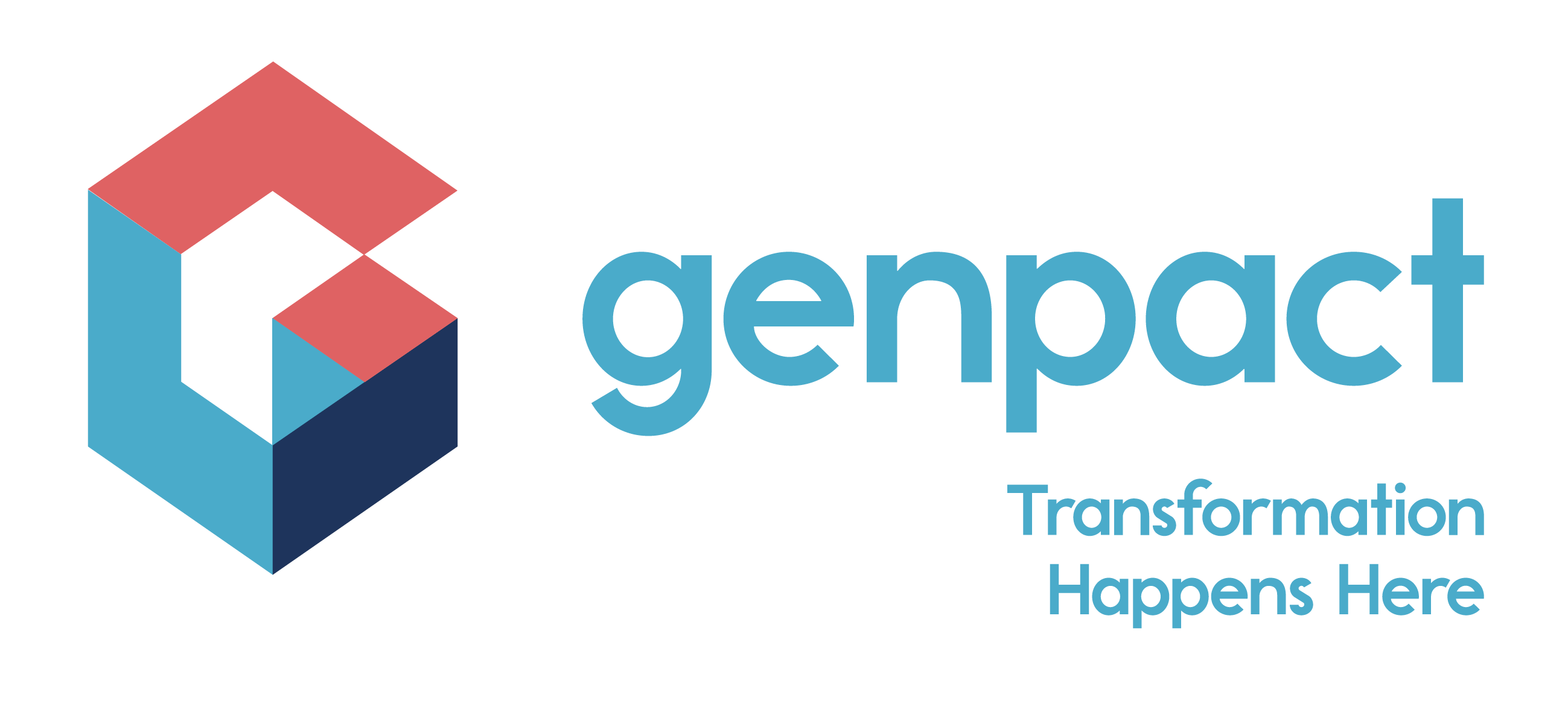
Genpact is the largest Business Process Outsourcing (BPO) company operating in the province of Bataan of Bataan.

The City of Balanga is one of the twenty-five (25) emerging digital hubs identified by The Digital Cities 2025 program by the Department of Information and Communications Technology (DICT), Information Technology and Business Process Association of the Philippines (IBPAP), and Leechiu Property Consultants, Inc. (LPC). It hosts several outsourcing companies such as Genpact, Boston-based start-up Botkeeper, and Australia-based Yoonet. While in the town of Mariveles, the Freeport Area of Bataan is now hosting several blockchain and fintech firms. The town of Abucay is also being groomed as the province's next Business Process Outsourcing (BPO) hub thru its First Abucay Freeport Inc. which is a declared expansion area of the Authority of the Freeport Area of Bataan and with Cognizant as its first locator.

==== Banking and finance ====
Bataan is served by most of the leading universal and commercial banks in the Philippines. Based from the Bangko Sentral ng Pilipinas (BSP) statistics, as of September 2021, there are 41 universal and commercial bank branches, 36 thrift bank branches, and 31 rural and cooperative bank branches scattered around the province but with the most numbers in the City of Balanga and towns of Dinalupihan and Mariveles.

== Tourism ==
Bataan is rich in natural wonders and is also a popular heritage and historical destination especially due to its role during the beginning of the Pacific Theater of the Second World War.

=== Cultural and historical sites ===
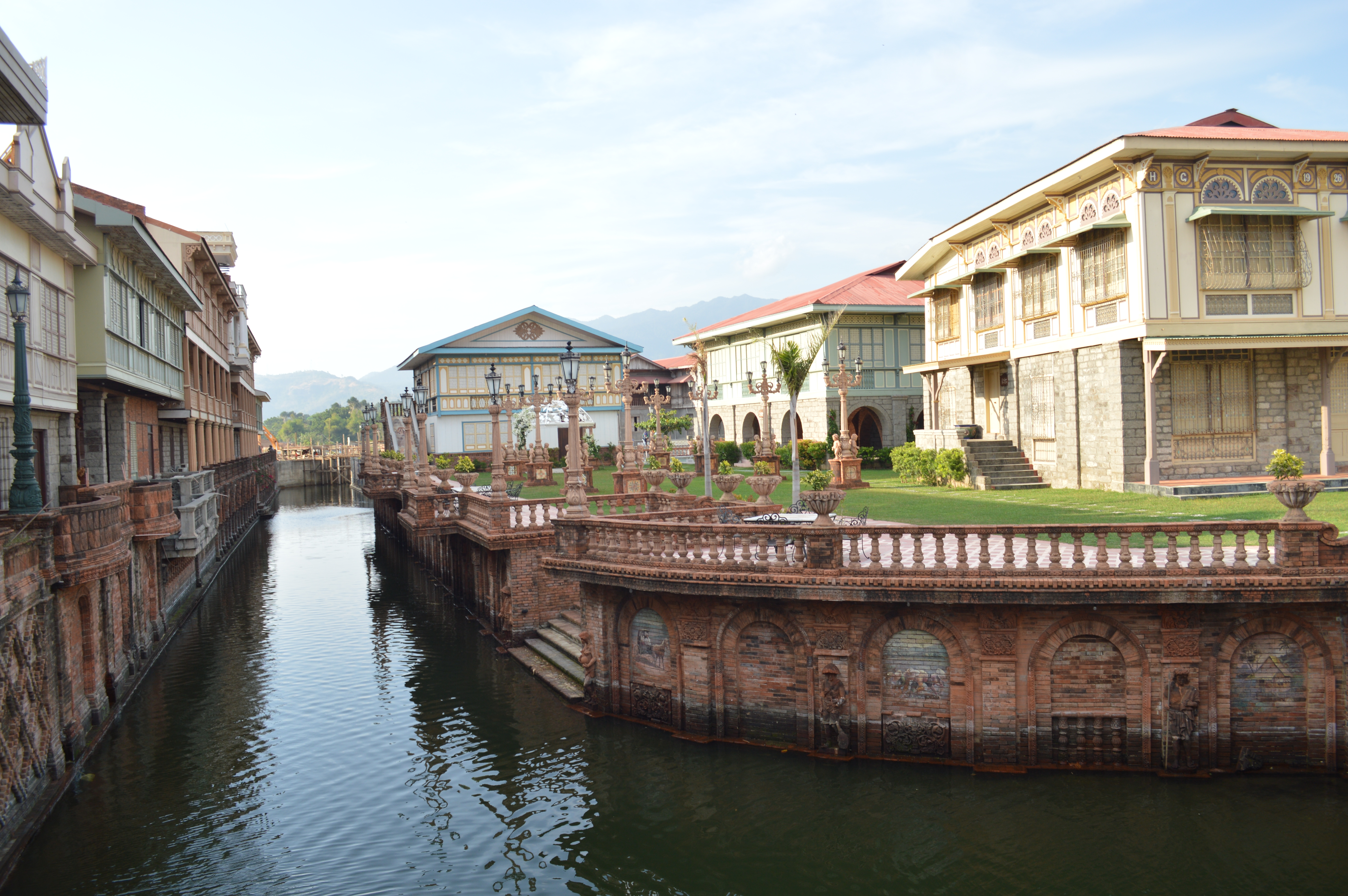
Umagol River in Las Casas Filipinas de Acuzar

- Mount Samat National Shrine or Dambana ng Kagitingan in Pilar is the most notable historical landmark in the province. The shrine was commissioned in 1966 to commemorate the soldiers who fought during the Battle of Bataan. It is composed of a marble colonnade and a memorial cross towering 555 meters above sea level.
- The First Line of Defense Marker located in Layac, Dinalupihan marks the first strong line of defense of the USAFFE forces against the Imperial Japanese Army during the Second World War.
- The Bataan Death March marker, also known as 0-kilometer markers, are monuments located in towns of Mariveles and Bagac indicating the points of origin of the infamous Bataan Death March.
- The Flaming Sword in Pilar is an obelisk located at the junction of Governor J.J. Linao National Road and Bataan National Road marking the converging point of the prisoners from Bagac and Mariveles during the Bataan Death March.
- The World War II Museum and Surrender Site Marker are both located inside the compound of Balanga Elementary School, the actual site where General Edward P. King negotiated the surrender of the 76,000 USAFFE soldiers to the Japanese Imperial Army.
- The Filipino-Japanese Friendship Tower in Bagac is a monument to commemorate the re-establishment of the Filipino-Japanese diplomatic friendship after the World War II.
- The Saint Dominic Parish Church or Abucay Church is a 17th-century church of Baroque style of architecture. Built in 1587 and administered by the Dominican Order friars, it housed the first printing presses in the Philippines. The church was also a witness to the massacre of hundreds of Filipinos and Spaniards by the Dutch Invaders on 23 June 1647.
- Cathedral-Shrine and Parish of St. Joseph or Balanga Cathedral is the seat of the Diocese of Balanga. During the World War II, the cathedral was used as an artillery emplacement by the Japanese Imperial Army to bombard USAFFE forces in Mount Samat.
- Minor Basilica of Our Lady of the Most Holy Rosary or Orani Church is a neoclassical Diocesan Marian Shrine and Pilgrimage church located in the center of the town of Orani.
- San Miguel Archangel Parish Church or Orion Church, is a 16th-century, Baroque church located at Brgy. San Vicente, Orion dedicated to Saint Michael, the Archangel.
- The Las Casas Filipinas de Acuzar in Bagac is a 40-hectare property housing several transplanted antique houses from different parts of the Philippines for preservation.

=== Ecotourism ===
- Bataan National Park - is a protected forest reservation located in the mountainous parts of northern Bataan.
- Roosevelt Protected Landscape - is a protected forest reservation that occupies an area of 786.04 hectares (1,942.3 acres) of grasslands and old-growth forest in northern Bataan province near Olongapo and the Subic Bay Freeport Zone.
- Mariveles Five Fingers - located at the southern tip of Bataan Peninsula, is a series of coves that looks like five human fingers when viewed from the air.
- Tarak Ridge - is popular among mountaineers, is one of the peaks of Mount Mariveles' volcano-caldera complex.
- Dunsulan Falls - is a waterfall at the foot of Mount Samat. Dunsulan falls and river is the main drainage on the crater side of Mount Samat.
- Mount Malasimbo - is a conical-shape mountain in Dinalupihan that is popular to mountaineers.
- Sibol Dos/Daan Pare Mangrove Eco Park - is a mangrove reservation and park in Orion
- Sibul Spring and Pasukulan Falls in Abucay
- Balon Anito in Mariveles
- Pintong Alipi Falls - is an 80-foot high waterfalls in Mount Silangan in Morong.
- Laki Beach - is a natural powdery-white sand beach in Mariveles
- Playa La Caleta Cove in Morong
- Camaya Coast - is a recreational development located in a cove in the southern tip of Mariveles.
- Ocean Adventure - is an open-space marine zoological park in Morong, inside the Subic Special Economic and Freeport Zone.
- KDR Adventure Camp - is an exclusive, members-only private adventure camp in the Municipality of Orani.
- Zoobic Safari - is a special petting zoo and animal observation area set in the jungles of Morong, inside the Subic Special Economic and Freeport.

=== Festivals and holidays ===
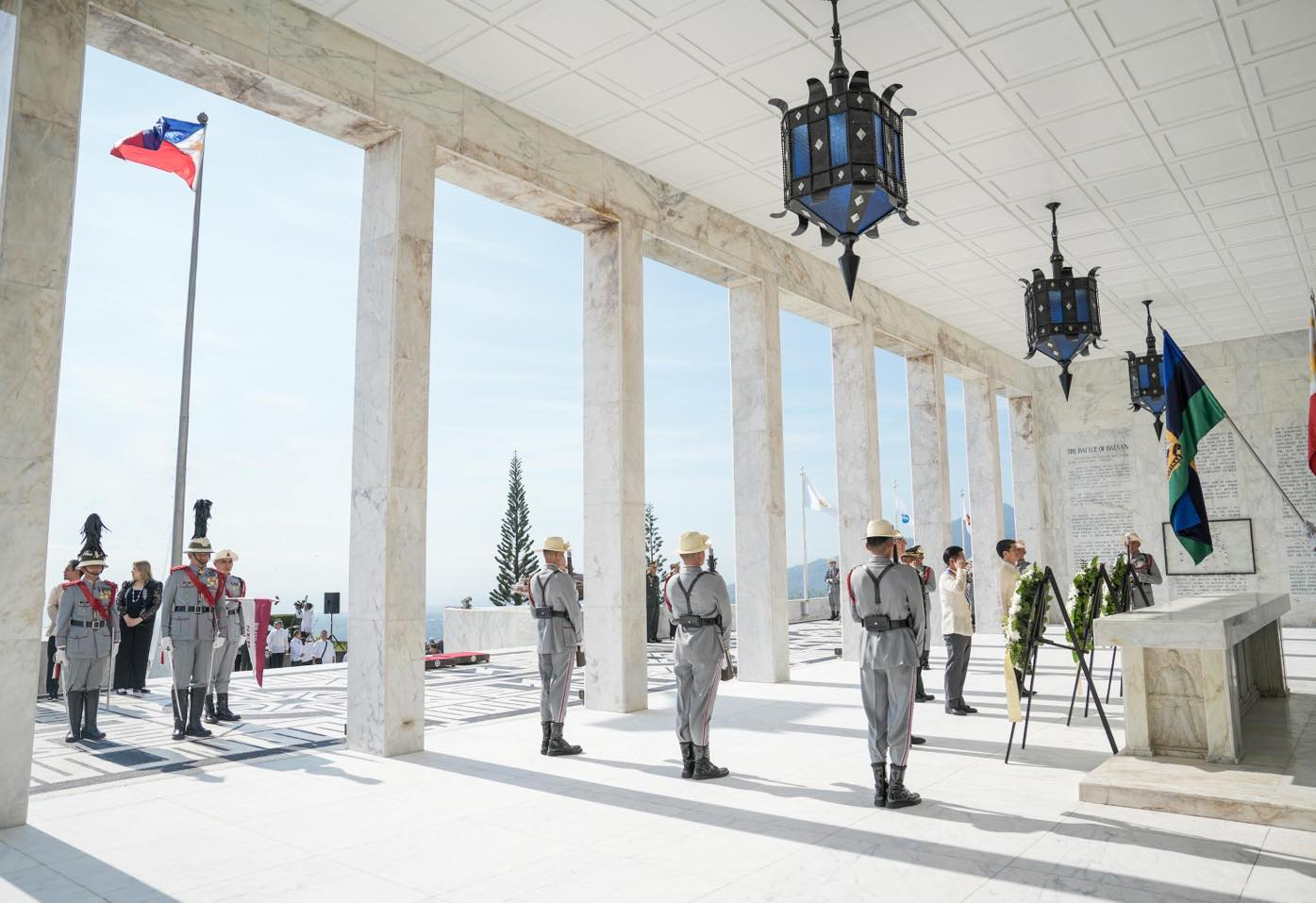
President Bongbong Marcos attending to the Day of Valor (Araw ng Kagitingan) ceremony in Mt. Samat, Bataan

- The Day of Valor or locally known as Araw ng Kagitingan, is a national observance in the Philippines to commemorate the Defenders of Bataan. It falls every 9th day of April.
- The Bataan Foundation Day is a local holiday falling every 11 January to celebrate the founding of the province of Bataan, through the virtue of the Republic Act No. 11138.
- The Pawikan Festival in Morong is celebrated annually every last week of November or first week of December to recognize the local community's successes in its marine turtle conservation campaign.
- The Ibong Dayo Festival, celebrated annually every February in the City of Balanga, is a popular attraction among bird enthusiasts. The aim of the festival is to disseminate to the public the importance of wetland conservation to migratory birds.
- The Diocesan Pilgrimage in Mount Samat, is an annual event of the Diocese of Balanga held on November or December of the year since the tenure of Socrates Villegas as the diocese's third bishop on 27 November 2004, except in 2024 due to having no Bishop of Balanga yet and person available to celebrate the pilgrimage, and is attended by thousands of young people from Bataan and different provinces in Luzon. The pilgrims walk seven kilometers from the foot of Mt. Samat up to the World War II shrine on top of the mountain. The event's theme song is "Bataan: Bayani at Banal".

== Infrastructure ==
=== Power ===
==== Generation ====
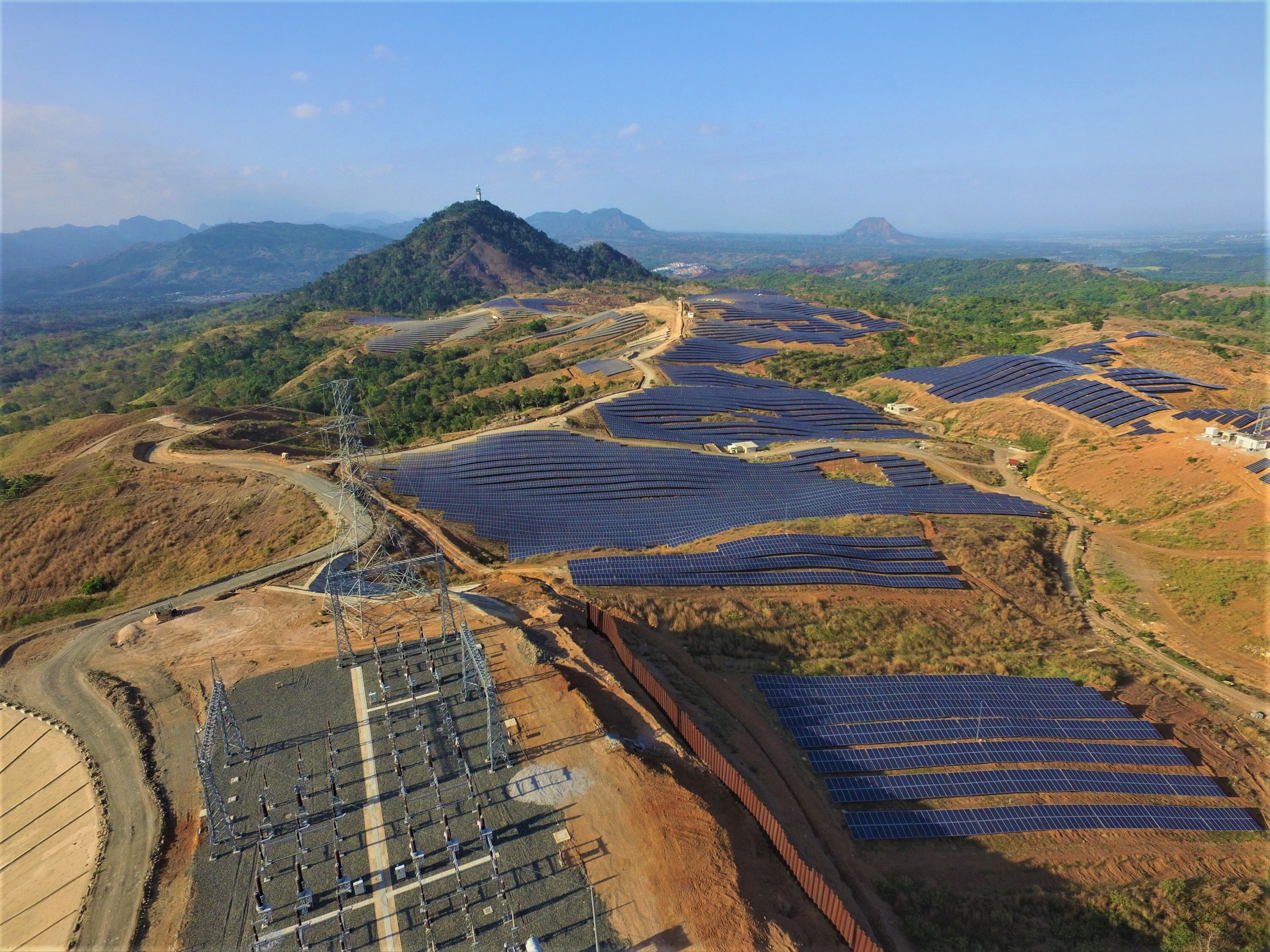
A solar power facility in Tipo, Hermosa area of the Subic Special Economic and Freeport Zone, Philippines

Bataan is a location of bulk power generation, where most of the power generated is sent to the Luzon Grid. Most power plants in Bataan rely on fossil fuels, like oil and coal, but renewable energy sources, primarily solar power, form part of the total generation. As of 30 November 2022 the total installed capacity of existing power plants equals to 3,676.7 MW. Incoming power plants that are under construction will increase the output to 4,920.7 MW, with targeted commissioning date of 3rd quarter, 2023 to 3rd quarter, 2026.

Fossil fuel-fired plants account for 3,528 MW, and are mostly concentrated in Limay and Mariveles. These include the GN Power Mariveles Coal Power Plant, with 690 (2x345) MW, SMC Limay Greenfield Power Plant (4x150 MW), Petron Cogeneration Power Plant (4x35 MW), Panasia Bataan Combined Cycle Power Plant (648 MW), and the recently commissioned GN Power Dinginin Units 1 and 2 (725x2 MW). Two plants are under construction, Petron's Refinery Solid Fuel-Fired Boiler Project - Phase 3 (44 MW), and SMC Mariveles Coal Power Plant (8x150 MW). These will increase the capacity by additional 1,244 MW. Three natural gas-fired power plants with combined capacity of 3,275 MW are proposed, one planned in Limay and two in Mariveles. These are currently endorsed by the Department of Energy for grid-impact study.

Renewable energy, accounts for 92.4 MW. Existing renewable energy power plants include the Bataan 2020 Cogen Power Plant (12.5 MW), Cleangreen Energy Corp. Napier Grass Fired Power Plant (12 MW), YH Green Energy Solar Power Plant (12.6 MW), Citicore Solar Power Plant (18 MW), Morong Solar Power Plant (5 MW), and Jobin-Sqm Inc.'s (a subsidiary of Nickel Asia Corporation) Sta. Rita Solar (32.3 MW) in Tipo, Hermosa side of Subic Bay Freeport Zone. While additional 11.64 MW are expected from two projects that are on the advanced stage of construction, these are Citicore's 6.64 MW solar rooftop project in the Freeport Area of Bataan, and Ayala Corp.'s Bataan Solar Energy Inc. with 5 MW in Batangas Dos, Mariveles. Two more solar power projects are in the pipeline - Solana Solar Power Project (28 MW) and Jobin-Sqm Inc. Bataan Solar Power Project Phases 1, 2, 3a-3b (100 MW). Also, two wind power projects are planned, the 500 MW Bagac Bay Offshore Wind Project and 300 MW Bagac Bay Onshore Wind Project, both by Earth Sol Power Corporation. These are also endorsed by the Department of Energy for grid impact study.

The Bataan Nuclear Power Plant in Morong, with a design 600 MW capacity, was supposed to be the first nuclear power plant in the Philippines. It was supposed to commence operation in 1986, but was mothballed amidst critical opposition to the Marcos regime and concerns on nuclear power. There is some discussion of either rehabilitating the plant, which would likely be uneconomical, or constructing a new nuclear power station.

==== Battery energy storage system ====
In 2021, San Miguel Corporation's Universal Power Solutions Inc. together with its partner Wärtsilä commissioned the first battery energy storage system (BESS) in Limay with 40 MW/40MWh capacity. Three more BESS projects are committed to be built - Hermosa Battery Energy Storage System (40 MW/40MWh), Lamao Battery Energy Storage System Phases 1 and 2 (30 MW/30MWh, 20 MW/20MWh), and BCCP Limay Battery Energy Storage System Project Phase 2 (20 MW/40MWh). All by Universal Power Solutions Incorporated.

==== Transmission ====
Power is transmitted to the province through various transmission lines and substations located within the province. There are four transmission substations located within the province which are the Hermosa, Balsik EHV, Limay, and Mariveles EHV substations of National Grid Corporation of the Philippines (NGCP). Since 2018, the province has a network of 500 kV transmission lines which are the Mariveles-Hermosa, Hermosa-Castillejos, Hermosa-San Jose, GNPower Dinginin-NGCP Mariveles, and MPGC – Mariveles Power Plant-NGCP Mariveles lines. The first three transmission lines are operated and maintained by NGCP while the last two are dedicated point-to-point generation facilities being operated by respective power generation companies.

==== Distribution ====

Power distribution in the province are served by the Peninsula Electric Cooperative (PENELCO) except the two freeport zones located within the province which are Subic Special Economic and Freeport Zone and Freeport Area of Bataan (including barangays of Mariveles that are also under the jurisdiction of FAB which are Malaya (Quadro) and Maligaya (Pizarro)) where they are served by Subic Enerzone and Utility Management Department (UMD) of Citicore Power Solutions 1, Inc. (GPS1), respectively. Some large customers have their power supply sourced from the transmission grid, whose network of 69,000 volt lines supply substations owned by PENELCO.

==== Research and development ====
Ayala Corporation Energy Holdings, Ltd (ACEN), the listed energy platform of the Ayala Group built the ACEN Tech Hub in Mariveles. Different energy and energy storage technologies will be tested here for possible large-scale use in the Philippines.

=== Airport ===
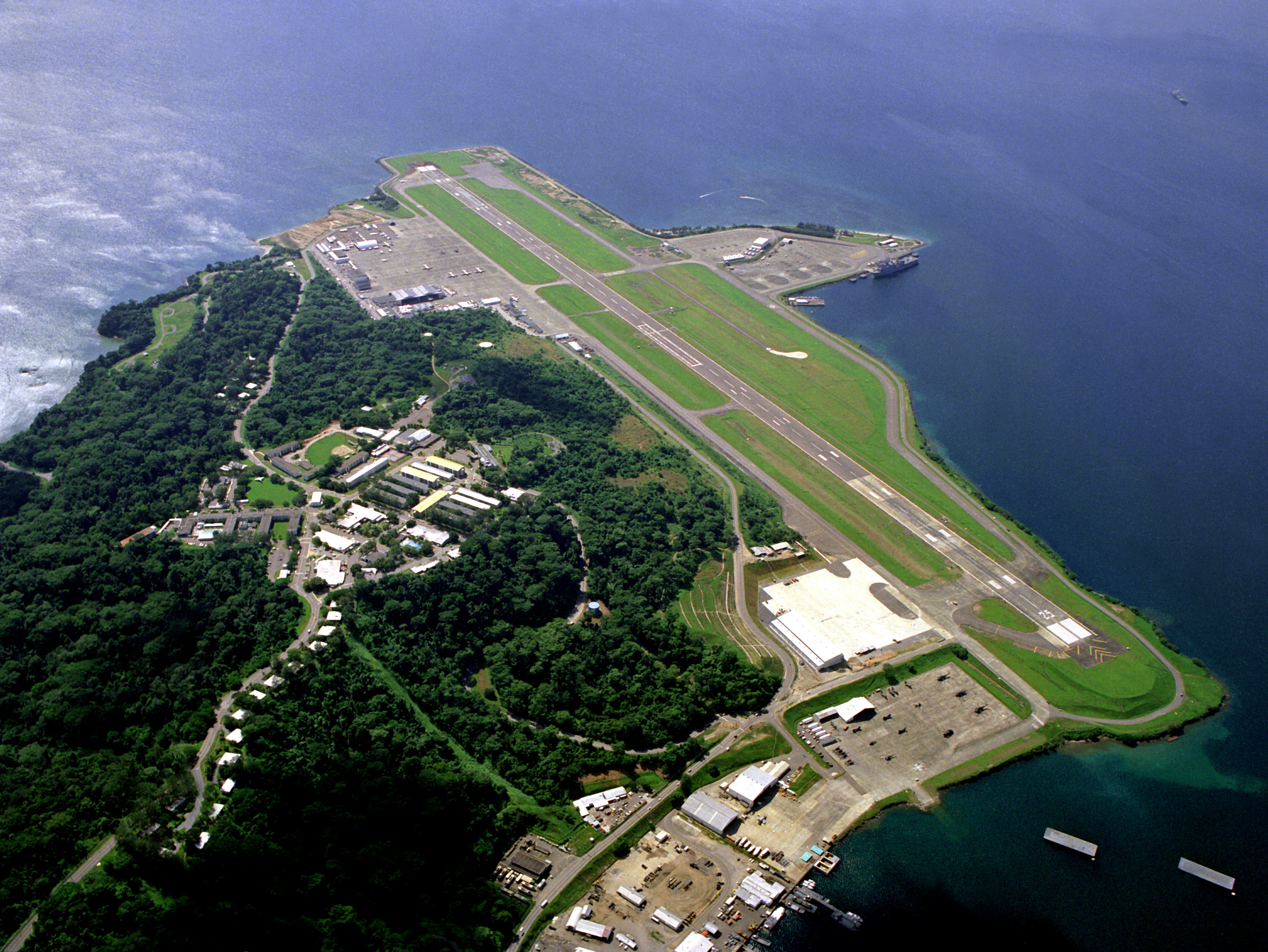
Aerial view of Subic Bay International Airport

- Subic Bay International Airport – located in Cubi Point, Mabayo, Morong area of Subic Bay Freeport Zone. It serves as a secondary and diversion airport for Ninoy Aquino International Airport and Clark International Airport. The airport was formerly the Naval Air Station Cubi Point, part of the U.S. Naval Base Subic Bay, before the base closed in 1992.

=== Seaports ===
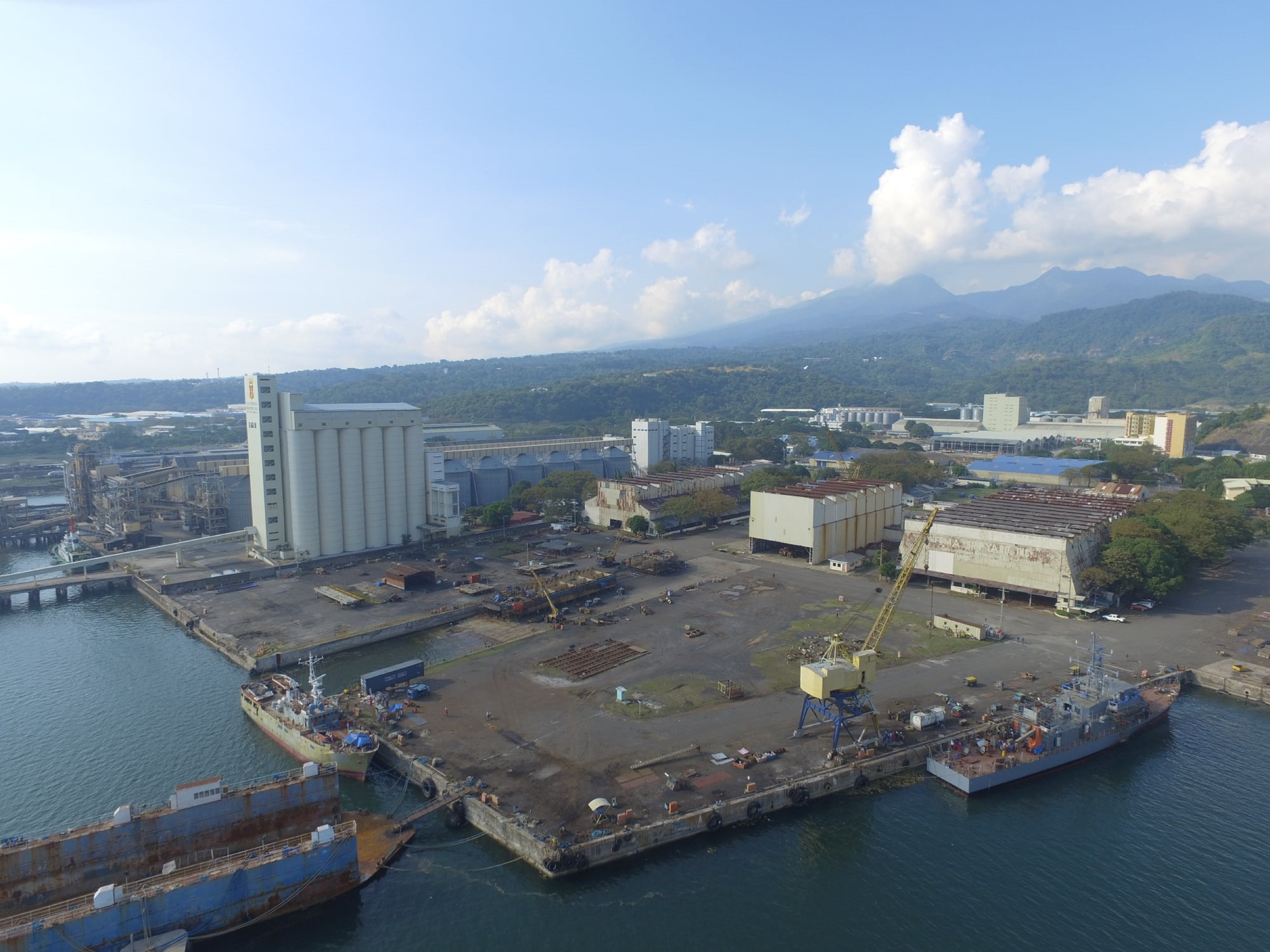
Port of Mariveles in Bataan

==== Port management ====
Port Management Office (PMO) - Bataan/Aurora of the Philippine Ports Authority is responsible for financing, management and operations of public ports operating in Bataan. Currently there are three government-owned ports, and these are:

- Port of Lamao/Limay – Baseport (PMO)
- Port of Mariveles – Subport (TMO)
- Port of Capinpin/Orion– Subport (TMO)

Limay and Mariveles ports are primarily used by tramper vessels/tankers catering to the requirement of industries and companies operating in the province. While the Port of Capinpin is equipped for Roll-on/roll-off (Ro-Ro) vessels to carry passengers which is served by 1Bataan Integrated Transport System from Esplanade Seaside Terminal at the Mall of Asia, Pasay to Orion and vice versa.

There are also 15 private ports/terminals that are operating in the province, namely:

- Jetti Petroleum Inc. (Mariveles)
- OilLink International Corporation (Mariveles)
- Petron Bataan Refinery (PBR) (Limay)
- PNOC (Mariveles)
- Planters Products Inc. (PPI)/GPII (Limay)
- Seafront Shipyard (Mariveles)
- SL Harbor Bulk Terminal Corporation (SLHBTC) (Limay)
- SMC Consolidated Power Corporation (Limay)
- GN Power (Mariveles)
- ATI Mariveles Grains Corporation (MGC) (Mariveles)
- Herma/Mariveles Shipyard Corporation (MSC) (Mariveles)
- SMC-Shipping and Lighterage (Mariveles)
- Total Philippines (Mariveles)
- Seasia-Nectar Mariveles Dry Bulk Terminal (Mariveles)
- Bataan Nuclear Power Plant Pier (Morong)

The Subic Bay International Terminal Corporation in Cubi Point, Subic Bay Freeport Zone, while part of Bataan thru the municipality of Morong, is located within the jurisdiction of Subic Special Economic and Freeport Zone and administered by Subic Bay Metropolitan Authority.

==== Customs administration ====
Thru the Customs Administrative Order (CAO)-05-2008, the new Collection District No. XVI to be known as Bureau of Customs (BOC)-Port Limay was established. It has jurisdiction and is responsible for assessment and collection of customs revenues from imported goods and other dues, fees, charges, fines and penalties accruing under the Customs Modernization and Tariff Act (RA 10863) from all ports within the province of Bataan excluding the portions of the province that is within the Subic Special Economic and Freeport Zone as defined by R.A. No. 7227. The BOC-Port of Limay is considered as the third largest port in the Philippines in terms of revenue collection, behind Manila International Container Port (MICP) and Port of Batangas. The total revenue collection of BOC-Port of Limay in 2023 reached PhP 123.24-billion (equivalent to US$2.24-billion).

=== Highways, expressways and national roads ===
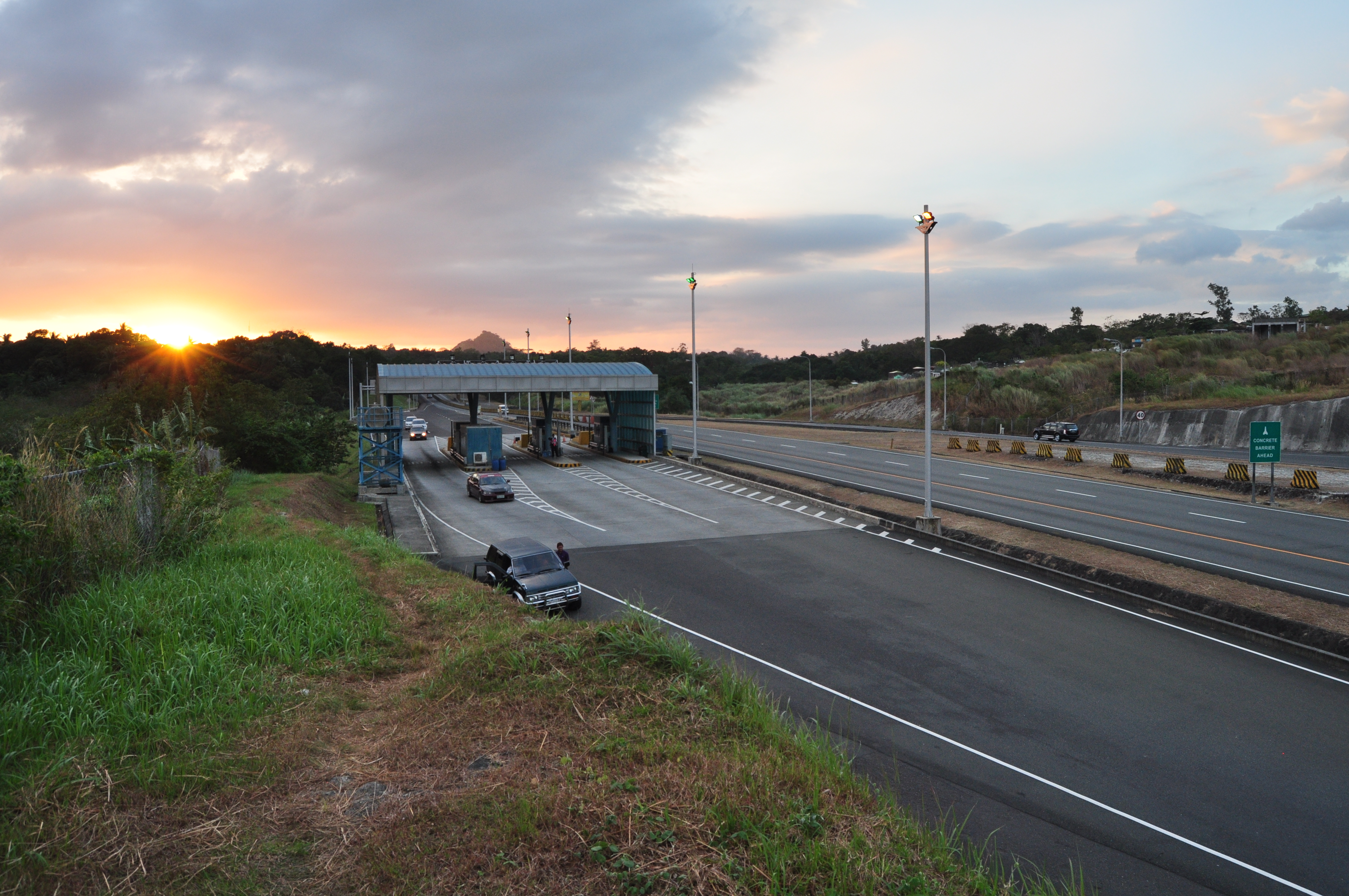
Tipo Interchange in Hermosa, Bataan, before the toll system integration with NLEx.

Bataan is served by a network of national highways and two expressways. Roman Superhighway, part of highway N301, and Jose Abad Santos Avenue, or highway N3 and Olongapo-Gapan Road, forms the backbone of the national highway network. Subic–Clark–Tarlac Expressway (SCTEX) and Subic Freeport Expressway (SFEX), are toll expressways, linking the province with Pampanga, Tarlac and Subic Special Economic and Freeport Zone. The Layac-Balanga-Mariveles Port Road (a.k.a. Old National Road), Bagac-Mariveles Road, SBMA-Morong Road and Governor J.J. Linao National Road forms the secondary network, which connects the smaller municipalities with the main highway network. In addition, a new 17.74-kilometer access road is being constructed to connect the Hermosa Ecozone and Industrial Park directly to the Subic Bay Freeport Zone. It will traverse the barangays of Palihan and Mabiga in Hermosa, and ends in Mabayo, Morong, to serve as a toll-free alternative to SCTEX and SFEX.

==== Bataan-Cavite Interlink Bridge ====
A 32-kilometer bridge called Bataan–Cavite Interlink Bridge is proposed to connect Bataan with Cavite, crossing Manila Bay, and is envisioned to be one of the world's longest marine bridges. The contract for detailed engineering and design was awarded in October 2020. The Philippine Department of Public Works and Highways announced that the bridge's construction, costing $3.91 billion, will be co-funded by Asian Development Bank (ADB), Asian Infrastructure Investment Bank (AIIB) and the Philippine government thru a 54%/29%/17% sharing respectively.

On 12 December 2023, the ADB announced it has approved the $2.1 billion funding it promised for the construction of this bridge. On 15 December of the same year, the Philippine government, through the Department of Finance (DOF), and the Asian Development Bank (ADB) signed the first tranche of the financing for this project, worth $650 million of the total $2.1 billion loan package. On the other hand, AIIB announced that their share of first tranche funding, worth $350 million, would be available to the Philippine government in January 2024.

=== Sports facilities ===
Public sports facilities are dispersed across the province. Indoor sports arenas or gymnasiums are located in the towns of Dinalupihan, Hermosa, Orani, Orion, Limay and Mariveles, and there are two in the City of Balanga. An olympic-size swimming pool frequently used for local competitions is situated in the town of Abucay. While the town of Dinalupihan hosts the remaining athletics track and field in the province after the conversion of former Bataan Provincial Oval in Balanga to a public highschool.

There are three privately owned golf courses in the province, these are:

- Anvaya Cove Golf and Sports Club - is an 82-hectare, 18-hole all-weather, 7,200 yard, par 72 championship golf course located in Ayala Land's Anvaya Cove development in Morong.
- Tandatangan Golf Course - by Camaya Coast, consists of 9 signature golf holes with a total of 36 Par, 2,994 Meters and 3,275 Yards. Located approximately 170 meters above sea level.
- The Peninsula Golf Club - is an 18-hole golf course laid out around the Petron Bataan Refinery's Housing Compound in Limay. A pair of tee-boxes is provided for each hole to complete an 18-hole round of golf. It is a relatively short golf course at just par 68, with a rating of 65.4 and a corresponding slope of 116.

== Education ==
As of 2018, literacy rate in Bataan is 99.4% (Literacy of the Household Population 10 Years Old and Over). Access to education opportunities is provided by 259 elementary schools, 84 secondary schools and 19 tertiary schools, owned and operated by either the government or private persons/groups. There are also 6 TESDA-accredited institutions offering technical/vocational courses.

=== Educational institutions ===
Bataan Peninsula State University or BPSU is a state-owned university and the leading tertiary education provider in the province. It was established by virtue of Republic Act 9403, signed into law on 22 March 2007. It is a conglomeration of five state-owned higher education institutions in Bataan. The university currently has six campuses scattered across the province - the Main Campus (formerly Bataan National School of Arts and Trade), Balanga Campus (formerly Bataan Community Colleges), Abucay Campus (formerly Bataan National Agricultural School), Dinalupihan Campus (formerly Bataan State College), Orani Campus (formerly Bataan National Polytechnic School), and Bagac Campus. Its seventh campus in Sabang, Morong, Bataan is now under construction

Another state-owned higher education institution in the province is Polytechnic University of the Philippines Bataan, which is a satellite campus of the Polytechnic University of the Philippines in Sta. Mesa, Manila, established in 1976. It is located at Barangay Malaya in Mariveles, one of the municipality's five barangays also covered by Freeport Area of Bataan (FAB).

Other notable tertiary education institutions in Bataan are listed below:

- AMA Computer Learning Center – Balanga
- APG International Aviation Academy – Cubi Point, Subic Bay Freeport Zone, Morong
- Asia Pacific College of Advanced Studies (APCAS) – Balanga
- Bataan Heroes Memorial College – Balanga
- Bataan Maritime Institute – Balanga
- Colegio de San Juan de Letran Bataan – Abucay
- College of Subic Montessori – Dinalupihan
- Eastwoods College of Science and Technology – Dinalupihan
- EastWoods Professional College of Science and Technology (formerly SOFTNET College of Science and Technology) – Balanga
- Fist Aviation Academy, Inc. – Cubi Point, Subic Bay Freeport Zone, Morong
- Limay Polytechnic College – Limay
- Maritime Academy of Asia and the Pacific – Mariveles
- Microcity College of Business and Technology (Formerly: Microcity Computer College Foundation, Inc.) – Balanga
- Omni Aviation School – Cubi Point, Subic Bay Freeport Zone, Morong
- Philippine Women's University CDCEC Bataan - Balanga
- St. Joseph Colleges of Balanga – Balanga
- Softnet Information Technology Center – Mariveles
- Tomas del Rosario College – Balanga
- University of Nueva Caceres-Bataan – Dinalupihan

=== Iskolar ng Bataan ===
Iskolar ng Bataan is a provincial government-funded tertiary education scholarship program with a primary goal of producing at least one professional in every household in the province and be gainfully employed in the trade and industries operating inside or outside the province.

=== Bataan Highschool for the Arts ===
Through Republic Act No. 11190, the Bataan High School for the Arts is established as the second specialized public high school in the Philippines offering arts-focused education after the Makiling-based Philippine High School for the Arts (PHSA).

The School aims to develop artistically gifted and talented students by implementing a special secondary education curriculum and support programs committed to the conservation and promotion of the Filipino artistic and cultural traditions. This is also a Center for Arts and Design of the Senior High School Program among the twenty school divisions of Central Luzon. Through the establishment of the BHSA, DepEd will be able to help select, stimulate, and prepare students for a career in the arts and cultural work who will serve the region and the country.

=== Bataan Highschool for Sports ===
By virtue of Republic Act No. 12239 signed in September 2025, Bataan High School for Sports, a specialized high school to foster young athletic talents is being established in the municipality of Bagac. It integrates general secondary education with specialized sports training to develop the athletic potential of Filipino youth.

== Notable people ==
=== National heroes and patriots ===
- Cayetano Arellano (Orion) – first chief justice of the Supreme Court of the Philippines
- Francisco Baltazar (Orion) – one of the greatest Filipino literary laureates, born in Bigaa (Balagtas), Bulacan, but spent his adult life in Orion, Bataan
- Pablo Tecson - was an officer in the Revolutionary Army serving under Gen. Gregorio del Pilar and a member of the Philippine Assembly in Malolos representing Bataan's at-large district.
- Oscar Joson (Balanga) - is the youngest Filipino to receive the US Congressional Gold Medal for bravery and sacrifice of own life. He was a 14-year old Boy Scout who died in Balanga during the early days of World War II.
- Tomas Pinpin (Abucay) – is remembered for being the first Filipino to publish and print a book, "Librong Pagaaralan nang mga Tagalog nang Uicang Castilla" (Reference Book for Learning Castellano in Tagalog) in 1610, entirely written by himself in the old Tagalog orthography.
- Tomas del Rosario (Orani) – judge, statesman and first governor of the province of Bataan from 1903 to 1905. He was one of the delegates to the Malolos Congress in 1898 and to the Philippine Assembly from 1909 to 1912.

=== Politics, military and government ===
- Alfredo Juinio (Limay) – was a former Secretary of Public Works and Highways. He also served as the Dean of the University of the Philippines College of Engineering. Alfredo Juinio Hall, the building that houses the National Engineering Center, is named after him. He was once described as "one of the country's most brilliant engineers."
- Cesar Banzon Bautista (Balanga) - was the 13th Ambassador of the Republic of the Philippines to the United Kingdom and was the Secretary of Trade and Industry from 1996 to 1998.
- Emilio Gancayco (Orion) – a lawyer who served as an Associate Justice of the Supreme Court of the Philippines from 12 January 1987 to 22 August 1997.
- Felicito Payumo (Dinalupihan) – was the Chairman of the Subic Bay Metropolitan Authority from 1998 to 2004, and Bases Conversion and Development Authority from 2011 to 2012. He also represented the First District of Bataan in the House of Representatives of the Philippines from 1987 to 1998. He was principal author of the Build, Operate, and Transfer Law, the Philippine Economic Zone Authority (PEZA) Law, and the Act converting the military bases into special economic zones.
- Fulgencio Factoran (Orion) - a lawyer and an advocate of freedom of the press in the Philippines. He served as Secretary of Environment and Natural Resources from 1987 until 1992, and Deputy Executive Secretary (1986–1987) of former President Corazon C. Aquino.
- Geraldine Roman (Orani) – journalist and politician, she is the first transgender woman elected to the Philippine House of Representatives.
- Harry Roque (Limay) – a lawyer and the presidential spokesperson of President Rodrigo Duterte from 2017 to 2018 and from 2020 to 2021.
- Ismael L. Mathay Sr. (Balanga) - served as Auditor General of the Philippines from 1966 until 1972, under President Ferdinand Marcos. He is the father of former Quezon City mayor Mel Mathay. Ismael Mathay Sr. High School in Quezon City was named after him.
- Luz Banzon Magsaysay (Balanga) – wife of Philippine President Ramon Magsaysay; seventh First Lady of the Philippines
- Merceditas Gutierrez (Samal) – was a two-time Justice Secretary during the administrations of Gloria Macapagal Arroyo and Benigno Aquino III, Gutierrez also became the first woman to head the post of Ombudsman. She assumed the position on 1 December 2005, and resigned from office on 29 April 2011.
- Manuel C. Herrera (Pilar) – was a deputy ombudsman during the Marcos regime and later, head of the prosecution panel in the Benigno Aquino Jr., and later became one of the justices of the Court of Appeals from 1987 to 1997, and chair of the National Unification Commission.
- Norberto Gonzales (Balanga) - was the Secretary of National Defense (2 July 2007 – 7 August 2007), and National Security Advisor (February 2005 – 2 July 2007)
- Pedro Tuason (Balanga) – Solicitor General of the Philippines (1921), he also served as Justice Secretary during the administration of President Ramon Magsaysay.
- Romeo Espino (Samal) – was a military general who served as Chief of Staff of the Armed Forces of the Philippines from 1971 to 1980.

=== Business and economy ===
- David Consunji (Samal) – founder of publicly listed holding firm, DMCI Holdings, Incorporated. He was a former secretary of the Department of Public Works, Transportation and Communications from 1970 to 1975. In 2014, Forbes listed him as the 6th richest Filipino, with a net worth of US$3.9 billion.
- Jose Acuzar (Balanga) - also known as "Jerry" Acuzar, is a prominent real estate businessman. He founded and owns New San Jose Builders, Inc, Manuel L. Quezon University in Quezon City, and the heritage resort Las Casas Filipinas de Acuzar. On 29 July 2022, newly elected President Bongbong Marcos appointed him as Secretary of Housing Settlements and Urban Development.
- Jose Isidro Camacho (Balanga) - is a Filipino banker who served as the Philippines' Secretary of Energy and later on as Secretary of Finance under President Gloria Macapagal Arroyo. He is also a member of the Group of Experts of the ASEAN Capital Markets Forum, Singapore's Securities Industry Council, and the International Advisory Panel of the Securities Commission of Malaysia.
- Manuel Bamba Villar Jr. (Orani) – from 2019 to 2022, Forbes magazine named Villar as the richest individual in the Philippines, with an estimated net worth of $8.3 billion. He founded Vista Land. He was a Senator from 2001 to 2013 and as the President of the Senate of the Philippines from 2006 to 2008.
- Miguel Cuaderno Sr. (Balanga) - was the 17th Finance Secretary of the Philippines under Manuel Roxas and the first Governor of the Central Bank of the Philippines from 1949 to 1960. He was also a constitutionalist being one of the "Seven Wise Men" who drafted the 1935 Philippine Constitution.
- Orlando Banzon Vea (Balanga) - commonly known as Doy Vea in the tech sector, he co-founded Smart Communications along with David Fernando in 1991. He has since moved to several positions, including chief executive officer, President and Director of PLDT Communications and Energy Ventures as well as CEO, President and Director of DigiTel (Sun Cellular).

=== Education, arts and sciences ===
- Benjamin Tayabas (Hermosa) - is a US-trained Filipino educator and administrator. He is the longest-serving university president of the Pamantasan ng Lungsod ng Maynila.
- Julián Cruz Balmaceda (Orion) - was a Filipino poet, essayist, playwright, novelist, journalist and linguist. He made several works written in Filipino, English and Spanish languages.
- Lázaro Francisco (Orani) - was a Filipino novelist, essayist and playwright. Francisco was posthumously named a National Artist of the Philippines for Literature in 2009.
- Laureana San Pedro-Rosales (Limay) - educator, philanthropist and founder of Capitol University in Cagayan de Oro, Mindanao and other universities in Northern Mindanao.

=== Religion ===
- Manuel C. Sobreviñas (Dinalupihan) - Bishop Emeritus of the Diocese of Imus
- Teodoro Bacani Jr. (Balanga) - Bishop Emeritus of the Diocese of Novaliches
- Oscar V. Cruz (Balanga) – Archbishop Emeritus of the Archdiocese of Lingayen-Dagupan

=== Sports and entertainment ===
- Bea Magtanong (Abucay) - also known as Patch Magtanong, is a Filipino lawyer, beauty queen and fashion model who was crowned Binibining Pilipinas International 2019.
- Dylan Harper (Dinalupihan) - is an American professional basketball player for the San Antonio Spurs of the National Basketball Association (NBA). Harper's mother, Maria Pizarro Harper (now Maria Harper-Marinick), was born in the Philippines and hails from the municipality of Dinalupihan in Bataan.
- Elisse Joson (Balanga) - Filipina actress, endorser, model and businesswoman
- Evangeline Pascual (Orani) – actress and First Runner-up Miss World 1973
- Gary David (Dinalupihan) – a former professional basketball player, a former member of 2014 Gilas Pilipinas, a member of the Dinalupihan Municipal Council
- Janine Tugonon (Orion) – model, TV host and Miss Universe 2012 first runner-up
- Jessica Sanchez (Samal) – a singer-songwriter. She rose to prominence following her finish as the runner-up on the eleventh season of American Idol.
- Kerby Raymundo (Orion) – a former professional basketball star
- Mel Tiangco (Pilar) – popular television newscaster and television host; head of GMA Kapuso Foundation
- Rodel Naval (Orion) – Filipino singer, songwriter and actor.
- Romi Garduce (Balanga) – was among the first Filipinos to reach the peak of Mount Everest

== See also ==
- Bataan Provincial Expressway
- Petron Corporation (formerly known as Bataan Refining Corporation)
- Diocese of Balanga
- Freeport Area of Bataan
