= Felicito Payumo =

Filipino politician (1939–2025)

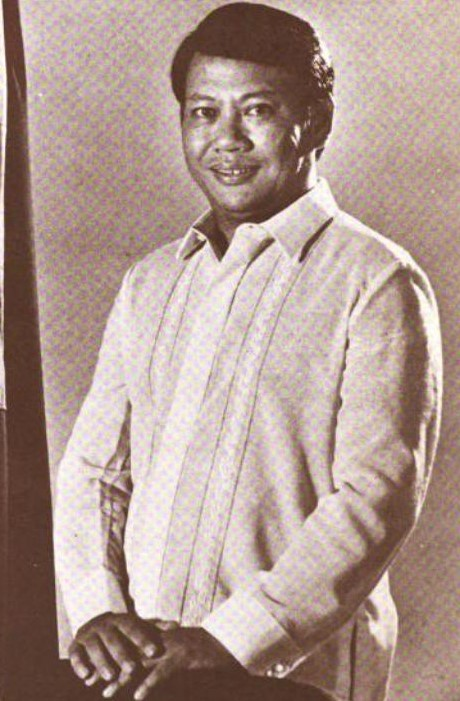
- Payumo official portrait during the 8th Congress

Chairman of the Bases Conversion and Development Authority
- In office April 12, 2011 – December 22, 2012
- Preceded by: Aloysius Santos
- Succeeded by: Rolando Gosienfiao

Chairman and Administrator of the Subic Bay Metropolitan Authority
- In office June 30, 1998 – October 15, 2004
- Preceded by: Richard J. Gordon
- Succeeded by: Francisco H. Licuanan

Member of the Philippine House of Representatives from Bataan's 1st congressional district
- In office June 30, 1987 – June 30, 1998
- Preceded by: Position created
- Succeeded by: Antonino Roman

Personal details
- Born: Felicito Cruz Payumo; March 7, 1939 Dinalupihan, Bataan, Commonwealth of the Philippines
- Died: October 20, 2025 (aged 86) Hong Kong
- Party: NPC (2012–2025)
- Other political affiliations: Liberal (1987–2012)
- Education: Ateneo de Manila University; Harvard University
- Occupation: Politician

Felicito Cruz Payumo (March 7, 1939 – October 20, 2025) was a Filipino businessman and politician who previously served as chairman of University of Nueva Caceres–Bataan. He represented the First District of Bataan in the House of Representatives of the Philippines from 1987 to 1998, and served as chairman of the Subic Bay Metropolitan Authority from 1998 to 2004 and Bases Conversion and Development Authority from 2011 to 2012, respectively.

== Early life and career ==
Born in Dinalupihan, Bataan, Payumo graduated valedictorian from the Northern Bataan Institute. He studied at the Ateneo de Manila University, where he completed his Bachelor of Science, Major in Economics, cum laude. He held an MBA from Harvard Business School on an S.C. Johnson Scholarship. He completed the Executive Program for Leaders in Development at the John F. Kennedy School of Government.

He worked in the private sector for more than twenty years, including stints at Procter and Gamble Philippines, Mobil Corporation in New York, and Engineering Equipment Incorporated, where he served as president before venturing into politics.

As legislator, he was voted as one of "Top 10 Congressmen" from the 8th to the 10th Congress. He was principal author of the Build, Operate, and Transfer Law, the Philippine Economic Zone Authority (PEZA) Law, and the Act converting the military bases into special economic zones. He served as chairman of the Committee on Public Works during the 8th Congress and chairman of the Committee on Economic Affairs during the 9th and 10th Congress.

== Personal life and death ==
Payumo was married to Daisy Sison, a native of Naga, Camarines Sur. The couple maintained a long family life together and had five children. Throughout his public service and private sector career, he was known to keep his family life largely private, with limited public disclosure of personal details.

Payumo died in Hong Kong on October 20, 2025, at the age of 86. His death was later reported by his family.

== Awards ==
- 2003: Three Outstanding Filipinos (TOFIL), Philippine Jaycee Senate.
