= University of Nueva Caceres–Bataan =

Private university in Bataan, Philippines

- Former names: Bataan Peninsula Educational Institution; Northern Bataan Institute
- Motto: Non Scholæ Sed Vitæ (Latin)
- Motto in English: "Not of School but of Life"
- Type: Private, Non-sectarian, coeducational Higher education institution
- Established: 2014; 12 years ago
- President: Felicito C. Payumo
- Location: Rizal St. Dinalupihan, Bataan, Philippines; 14°51′58″N 120°28′09″E
- Colors: Red and Gray
- Nickname: UNC Greyhounds
- Mascot: Greyhound
- Website: uncbataan.edu.ph
- Location in Luzon Location in the Philippines

The University of Nueva Caceres–Bataan, formerly the Bataan Peninsula Educational Institution, is a private, non-sectarian, coeducational higher education institution owned and operated by Bataan Peninsula Educational Institution Inc. in Dinalupihan, Bataan, Philippines. It was founded in 2014 and offers senior high school education and undergraduate courses.

In 2026, Far Eastern University acquired the majority stake in University of Nueva Caceres–Bataan.
