= Ismael Mathay Sr. High School =

Public school in Metro Manila, Philippines

Ismael Mathay Sr. High School Filipino: Mataas na Paaralang Ismael Mathay, Ama

Location
- Branches Ext. GSIS Village, Sangandaan; Quezon City, Metro Manila 1116; Philippines
- Coordinates: 14°40′31.2″N 121°1′20″E

Information
- Type: Public
- Established: July 26, 1971 (as GSIS Village High School); 1992-2001 (as Ismael Mathay Sr. High School)
- Principal: Dr. Ferdinand A. Fontillio, EdD
- Grades: 7 to 10 (junior high school); 11 to 12 (senior high school)
- Enrollment: 4,261 (as of SY 2021 - 2022); Approx. 4,000 - 7,000; formerly known as referred to as "Villagers and Pioneers"; now called as "Ismaelians"
- Language: English, Filipino
- Campus: Urban
- Student Union/Association: IMSHS Supreme Student Government (SSG)
- Song: Ismael Mathay Sr. High School Hymn
- Nickname: The Alliance Percussion (sports band)
- Publication: The IMSHS Progress (Ramil Jhon P. Magno, adviser), formerly "The Village Bounty" (English); Sandigan (Bernardita T. Moron, tagapayo) (Filipino)
- Affiliations: Division of City Schools - Quezon City, Department of Education
- Website: www.facebook.com/Ismael-Mathay-Sr-High-SchoolGSIS-Village-High-School-231035316908547

The Ismael Mathay Sr. High School, formerly called the GSIS Village High School, is a high school situated in Quezon City, Philippines and more popularly known as the IMSHS, or simply, Mathay. The students and alumni are dubbed the "Ismaelians". The Village Bounty began as the official publication formed in 1971 by the pioneer students, however over the years the publication split in two, resulting in The IMSHS Progress and Sandigan, each representing their respective languages of English and Filipino.

== History ==
In 1971 parents in GSIS Village, Project 8, Quezon City petitioned for a high school within the village so that their children would not have to travel into the city for school. Later that year the city government approved the refurbishment of the second floor of the GSIS Village public market (palengke) to form an eight-room school, the GSIS Village High School.

The GSIS Village High School was originally headed by Regina I. Novales (1971–73). She was replaced by Jose V. Aguilar with the title of division supervisor-in-charge in 1974.

In 1976, the palengke and the school with it were gutted by a blaze.

While Ismael A. Mathay Jr. was Mayor of Quezon City (1992-2001), the GSIS Village High School was renamed after his late father, lawyer Ismael Mathay Sr.

== Ismael Mathay Sr. ==
Ismael Mathay Sr. was a Filipino statesman. In 1944, he was appointed by Sergio Osmeña, second President of the Commonwealth of the Philippines as Commissioner of Budget and Finance for the War Cabinet (1944–45) and later as Secretary of the Budget (1945–46). In the 1960s, Ismael Mathay Sr. held a position of auditor general, board director, and general manager of the National Marketing Corporation. He studied law and was admitted to the Philippine Bar on 16 January 1925.

== Levels ==
Grades 7 to 12
