= World War II monuments and memorials in the Philippines =

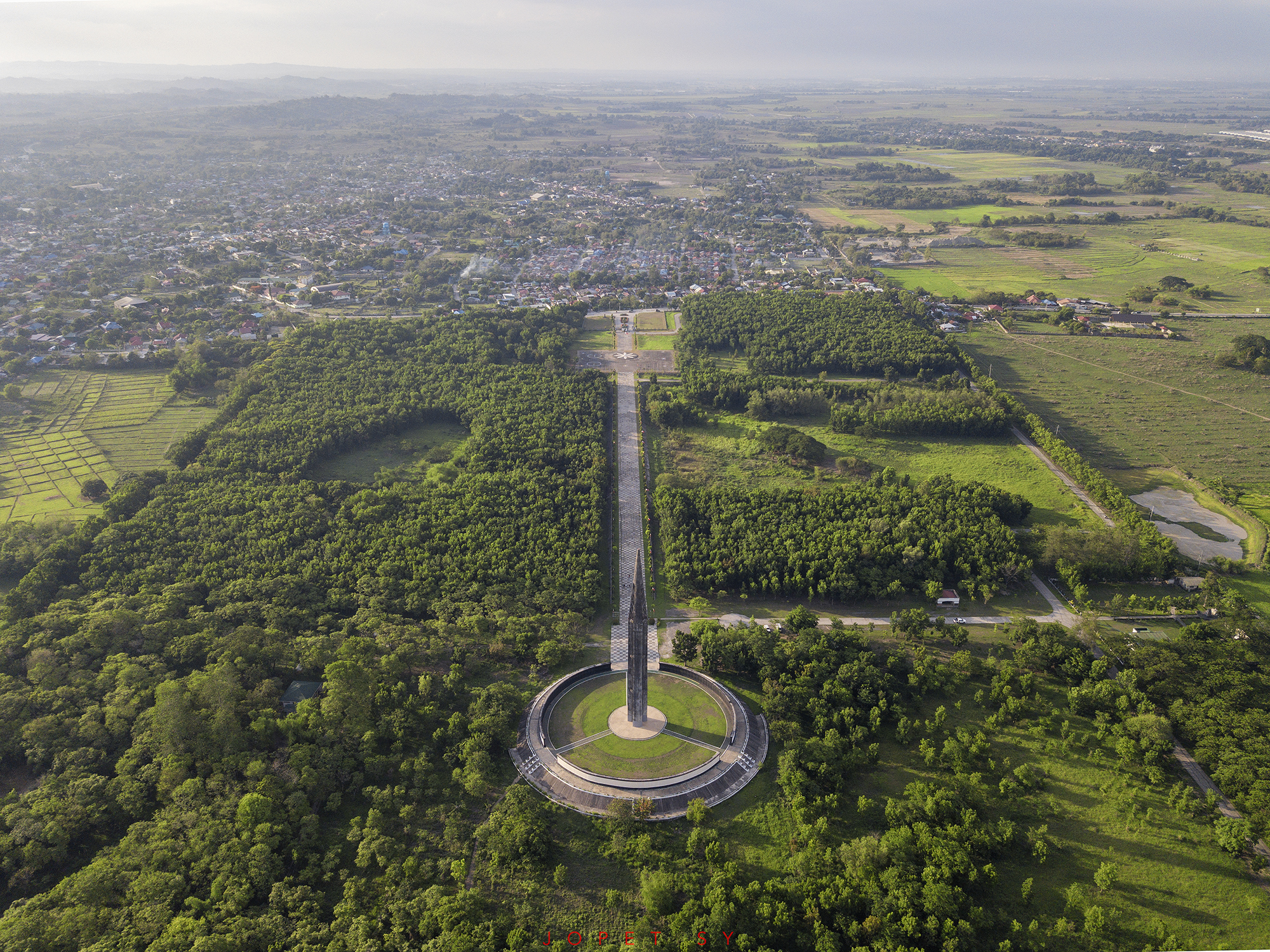
Capas National Shrine in Capas, Tarlac

The Philippines being one of the major theaters of World War II, has commissioned a number of monuments, cemeteries memorials, preserved relics, and established private and public museums, as well as National Shrines, to commemorate battles and events during the invasion, occupation, and liberation of the country. The United States and Japan also has established a number of memorials in the country.

The National Historical Commission provides national level oversight for national shrines. However, there are local and private initiatives to commemorate battles, massacres, and local heroes.

The events of World War II has forged a national identity for the country, as well as established traditions for the Philippine military.

== Background ==
Following the attack on Pearl Harbor, the Philippines being a commonwealth colony of the United States of America, was attacked by Japan on December 8, 1941. The attack was followed with landings made by the Imperial Japanese Army's 14th Area Army under Gen. Masaharu Homma in northern Luzon, Lingayen Gulf, and Davao. Gen. Douglas MacArthur lead the United States Army Forces in the Far East (USAFFE) which absorbed the Philippine Army. While the rest of Southeast Asia capitulated to the Imperial Japanese Army's southern advance, American and Filipino forces withdrew to Bataan peninsula and Corregidor Island and held out for the next few months. Gen. MacArthur and Pres. Manuel L. Quezon was later directed by Washington to escape to Australia, where the former were to lead the American forces in the Southwest Pacific, and the latter to establish a government-in-exile in the United States.

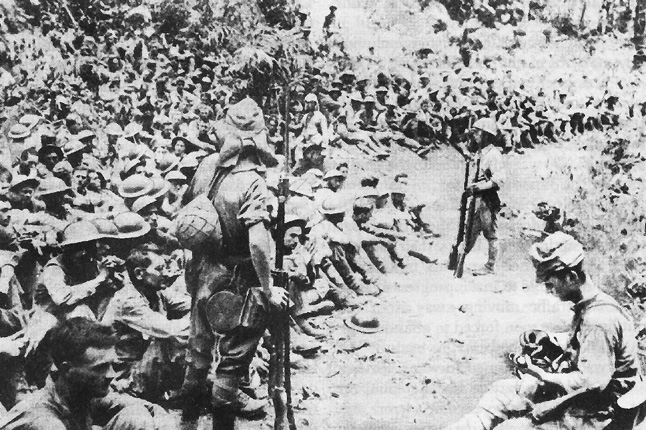
Japanese troops guard American and Filipino POWs in Bataan.

Due to the lack of reinforcement and supplies, and continuous Japanese onslaught, the USAFFE in Bataan under Gen. Edward King surrendered on April 9, 1942, which saw the largest surrender of American forces on foreign soil and lead to the infamous Bataan Death March where more than 16,000 of the 80,0000 American and Filipino POWs died. This was followed by Gen. Jonathan Wainwright's surrender of Corregidor on May 6, 1942, completing the occupation of Japan over the Philippines.

The POWs were then incarcerated in the Camp O'Donnell, where the IJA was ill-prepared to handle the numbers. The lack of supplies and basic needs has brought to 400 deaths per day among the POWs.

For the next 3.5 years, the Philippines came under Japan's Greater East Asia Co-Prosperity Sphere. While there were a number of leaders who collaborated with the Japanese authorities, some opted to resist through guerrilla warfare. The Filipino and American guerrillas provided critical intelligence to Gen. MacArthur's headquarters, and harassed Japanese forces during their occupation. The Filipino general public meanwhile suffered under oppressive Japanese retaliations, aside from the economic hardship brought about by the war.

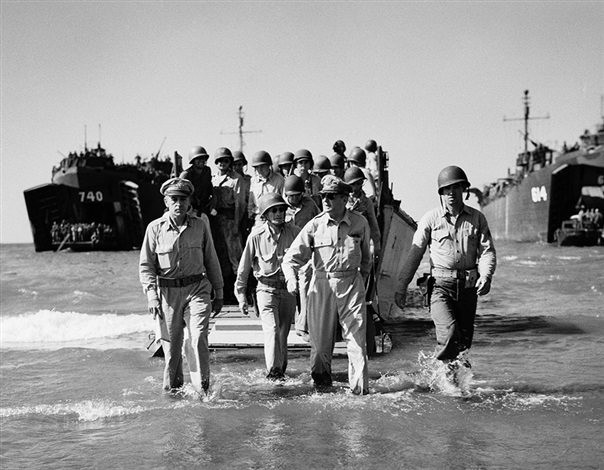
Return of Gen. Douglas MacArthur during the Leyte Landings.

Gen. MacArthur returned to the Philippines on October 24, 1944, with the largest amphibious operation in the Pacific Theater in Leyte Island. This was followed by the invasion of Mindoro on December for the establishment of air bases for Gen. George Kenney's Far East Air Force to cover the invasion of Luzon in January 1945. In the next few weeks, Gen. MacArthur's Sixth and Eighth Army moved from Lingayen and Batangas on a pincer move towards the capital, culminating in the Battle of Manila. In the next few months, the rest of the Philippines was liberated by both armies in successive battles.

After the surrender of Japan in September 1945, the American forces began establishing cemeteries around the country to commemorate the fallen American and Filipino troops, as well as civilians. When the Philippines gained independence on July 4, 1946, the country continued with the establishment of memorials, monuments, and commemoration of events during World War II.

== National Shrines ==
Name	Category	Location	Established	Remarks	Coordinates	Image
Mount Samat National Shrine	National Shrine	Pilar, Bataan	1970	To commemorate the valor of American and Filipino troops in Bataan, and the eventual surrender on April 9, 1944. Primary location of the celebration of Philippine Day of Valor or Araw ng Kagitingan.	14°36′20.80″N 120°30′32.17″E	
Pacific War Memorial	National Shrine	Corregidor, Cavite	1968	To commemorate the American and Filipino forces who lost their lives during World War II.	14°22′52″N 120°34′34″E	
Capas National Shrine	National Shrine	Capas, Tarlac	1991	To commemorate the suffering of American and Filipino POWs interred in the Japanese concentration camps.	15°20′56″N 120°32′43″E	
Manila American Cemetery	Cemetery	Fort Bonifacio, Metro Manila	1948	Cemetery for 17,206 American and Filipino military personnel from WWII.	14°32′28″N 121°03′00″E	
Libingan ng mga Bayani	Cemetery	Fort Bonifacio, Metro Manila	1947	Cemetery for 58,780 Filipino military personnel and veterans from WWII, Korean War, Vietnam War and local insurgencies.	14°31′12″N 121°02′38″E	
Dalton Pass National Shrine	National Shrine	Santa Fe, Nueva Vizcaya	Date	Location of the Battle of Balete Pass or Dalton Pass, where Japanese and American forces fought in March 1945.	16°07′59″N 120°55′48″E	
Kiangan National Shrine	National Shrine	Kiangan, Ifugao	Date	Location where World War II ended in the Philippines during the surrender of Gen. Tomoyuki Yamashita.	16°46′45″N 121°04′53″E	

== Museums ==
Name	Category	Location	Established	Remarks	Coordinates	Image
Mount Samat WWII Museum	Public Museum	Pilar, Bataan	1970	Displays relics, static displays, and accounts of the Battle of Bataan.	14°36′20.80″N 120°30′32.17″E	
Corregidor Museum & Tour	Public Museum	Corregidor, Cavite		The whole island has been turned into a museum and tour site, with visits to gun batteries, shrines, markers, and museums.	14°22′52″N 120°34′34″E	
Capas National Shrine Museum	Public Museum	Capas, Tarlac	1991	Visual documentation and accounts of the suffering of the American and Filipino POWs incarcerated in this location after the Battle of Bataan. Also displays a PNR cattle car where 60-80 men were crammed in for a day's ride from San Fernando to Capas.	15°20′56″N 120°32′43″E	
Manila American Cemetery & Memorial	Public Museum	Fort Bonifacio, Metro Manila	2020	Newly opened museum at the visitors center depicting the heroic actions of American and Filipino soldiers during the WWII.	14°32′24″N 121°03′03″E	
Clark Museum	Museum	Clark Freeport and Special Economic Zone, Pampanga	1993	Contains relics, weapons, and uniforms from WW2..	14°10′08″N 121°13′22″E	
AFP Museum	Museum	Camp Aguinaldo, Quezon City	Date	Contains static displays, relics, weapons, and uniforms from WW2.	14°36′40″N 121°03′42″E	
Casa Real Shrine	Museum	Malolos, Bulacan	Date	Contains WW2 relics including copy of Gen. Yamashita's Instrument of Surrender.	14°50′40″N 120°48′41″E	
Fort Santiago Dungeon	Museum	Intramuros, Manila		Museum commemorating torture site used by Kempetai on Filipino military and civilians.	14°35′26″N 120°58′27″E	
Bataan World War II Museum	Museum	Balanga Elementary School, Balanga, Bataan		Municipal museum located adjacent to the Surrender of Bataan Monument at the Balanga Elementary School. Contains relics and historical account of the Battle of Bataan.	14°40′52″N 120°32′45″E	

== Battle Sites & Events Markers ==
Name	Category	Location	Established	Remarks	Coordinates	Image
Battle of Barrio Piis	Marker	Lucban, Quezon	2010	Marker commemorating the battle between units of the Philippine Army's 1st Regular Division, and the Japanese invading forces that landed in Mauban on December 26, 1941.	14°51′14″N 120°28′26″E	
First Line of Defense Monument	Monument	Dinalupihan, Bataan		Monument commemorating the location of the first line of defense by the defenders of Bataan.	14°51′14″N 120°28′26″E	
MacArthur Memorial Marker	Monument	Cagayan de Oro, Misamis Oriental	2008	Monument to commemorate the escape of Pres. Quezon and Gen. MacArthur's to Australia through Cagayan de Oro.	8°30′04″N 124°39′52″E	
Gen. Douglas MacArthur Landmark	Monument	Del Monte Airfield, Manolo Fortich, Bukidnon		Monument to commemorate Gen. MacArthur's and the Philippine Commonwealth Government's escape to Australia, through Del Monte Airfield. Inscription: In alis vincimus (On wings we conquer)	08°21′42″N 124°50′00″E	
Final Battle of Bataan Marker	Marker	Pilar, Bataan	Date	Marker commemorating the last battle by the 41st Infantry Division against Japanese forces on April 8, 1942.	14°38′00″N 120°30′40″E	Image
II Corps Last Line Marker	Marker	Bgy. Alangan, Limay, Bataan		Location of Gen. Edward P. King's last command HQ over the forces in Bataan. Alangan River served as the last line of defense up to April 8, 1942.	14°40′52″N 120°32′45″E	
Surrender of Bataan Marker	Monument	Bataan WWII Museum, Balanga, Bataan		Location of Gen. Edward P. King's surrender of USAFFE forces in Bataan to Japanese command on April 9, 1942.	14°40′52″N 120°32′45″E	
Bataan Death March Kilometer Zero	Kilometer Post	Mariveles, Bataan		Starting point of Bataan Death March in Mariveles, Bataan.	14°26′10″N 120°29′28″E	
San Fernando Train Station Death March Marker	Marker	San Fernando, Pampanga	Date	Embarkation point of American and Filipino POWs into cattle cars of the Philippine National Railway to Capas, Tarlac.	14°26′10″N 120°29′28″E	
Santo Domingo Train Station Death March Marker	Monument	Capas, Tarlac	Date	Disembarkation point of American and Filipino POWs after being transported in cattle cars of the Philippine National Railway from San Fernando, Pampanga.	14°26′10″N 120°29′28″E	
Pantingan Massacre Site	Marker	Bagac, Bataan	Date	To commemorate the Patingan River Massacre.		Image
Jose Abad Santos Monument	Monument	Tanawan, Carcar City, Cebu	November 14, 2021	Location commemorating the capture of Chief Justice Jose Abad Santos by the Japanese forces, and his eventual summary execution	10°07′42″N 123°35′57″E	Image
Narwhal Park	Monument	Nasipit, Agusan del Norte	2011	Commemorating the efforts of the USS Narwhal in support of the guerrilla movement in Mindanao, and rescuing civilians to Australia.	8°58′27″N 125°20′15″E	
MacArthur Landing Memorial National Park	Monument	Palo, Leyte	Date	To commemorate the Leyte Landings October 24, 1944 during the Battle of Leyte	11°10′20″N 125°00′44″E	
Battle of Sibuyan Sea Monument	Monument	Alcantara, Romblon	2007	To commemorate the Battle of Sibuyan Sea and the sinking of the IJN battleship Musashi	12°15′42″N 122°03′25″E	
Battle of Sibuyan Sea Monument	Monument	Banton, Romblon		To commemorate the Battle of Sibuyan Sea and the sinking of the IJN battleship Musashi	12°56′45″N 122°05′46″E	
Battle of Surigao Strait Monument	Monument	Surigao City, Surigao del Norte	2019	To commemorate the Battle of Surigao Strait, the last battleship-to-battleship action in history	15°14′21″N 120°34′08″E	
Kamikaze East Airfield Monument	Monument	Mabalacat, Pampanga	2000	Second airfield utilized by the Imperial Japanese Navy 1st Air Fleet during the counterattack against the American forces during the Battle of Leyte Gulf.	12°21′34″N 121°02′35″E	
Kamikaze West Airfield Monument	Monument	Clark Freeport and Special Economic Zone, Mabalacat, Pampanga	October 25, 2004	Second airfield utilized by the Imperial Japanese Navy 1st Air Fleet during the counterattack against the American forces during the Battle of Leyte Gulf.	15°13′02″N 120°32′59″E	Image
Sindangan War Memorial Shrine	Marker	Sindangan, Zamboanga del Norte	Date	On September 7, 1944, the submarine USS Paddle torpedoed the Japanese hell ship Shinyo Maru. The crew did not know there were 750 American POWs. Only 82 POWs survived and were rescued by the residents of Sindangan.	8°18′52″N 122°57′40″E	Image
Agdangan Massacre Marker	Marker	Bgy. Agdangan, Baao, Camarines Sur	Date	On October 15, 1944, Japanese soldiers massacred 77 Filipino civilians of Agdangan after a Japanese courier was ambushed in the area.	13°29′43″N 123°19′21″E	
Mindoro Landings Monument	Monument	San Jose, Occidental Mindoro	Date	To commemorate the Mindoro Landings which began the Battle of Mindoro on December 15, 1944	12°21′34″N 121°02′35″E	
Lingayen Landings Monument	Monument	Lingayen, Pangasinan	Date	To commemorate the Lingayen Landings on January 3, 1945.	16°02′03″N 120°13′52″E	
Zambales Landings Monument	Monument	San Narciso, Zambales	1994	To commemorate the Zamables Landings on January 19, 1945.	15°00′53″N 120°03′54″E	
Nasugbu Landings Monument	Monument	Nasugbu, Batangas	Date	To commemorate the Nasugbu Landings on January 31, 1945 by the Eighth United States Army.	14°04′17″N 120°37′30″E	
Tagaytay Ridge Landings Monument	Monument	Tagaytay City, Cavite	Date	To commemorate the Tagaytay airborne invasion on February 3, 1945, by the 11th Airborne Division.	14°06′55″N 120°57′43″E	
Cabanatuan American Memorial	Memorial	Cabanatuan, Nueva Ecija	April 12, 1982	Memorial for American POWs incarcerated at the Cabanatuan Concentration Camp, and their eventual rescue.	15°30′40″N 121°02′38″E	
Palawan Massacre Marker	Marker	Plaza Cuartel, Puerto Princesa, Palawan		Location of Palawan Massacre by the Japanese on 100 American POWs.	9°44′24″N 118°43′47″E	
UPLB Baker Memorial Hall	Marker	University of the Philippines Los Baños, Los Baños, Laguna	2005	Location of internment camp for American civilians.	14°09′43″N 121°14′33″E	
Memorare – Manila 1945	Statue	Intramuros, Manila	1995	Memorial statue for the 100,000 civilian victims of the Manila Massacre.	14°35′26″N 120°58′27″E	
White Cross	Marker	Intramuros, Manila		Marker commemorating the common grave of 600 individuals discovered in the Fort Santiago Dungeons after the Battle of Manila.	14°35′26″N 120°58′27″E	
Liberation of Baguio Marker	Marker	Naguilian Rd., Baguio City, Benguet		Dilapidated marker commemorating the efforts of the 33rd Infantry Division in liberating Baguio March 1945.	Coord	
Gen. Yamashita Surrender Site	Marker	Kiangan, Ifugao	Date	Gen. Yamashita, overall commander of Japanese forces in the Philippines surrendered at this location.	16°46′38″N 121°05′07″E	
Gen. Tomoyuki Yamashita Execution Site Shrine	Marker	Los Baños, Laguna	Date	Execution site of Gen. Tomoyuki Yamashita	14°10′08″N 121°13′22″E	
Gen. Masaharu Homma Execution Site Marker	Marker	Los Baños, Laguna	Date	Execution site of Gen. Masaharu Homma.	14°10′08″N 121°13′22″E	

== Other Monuments & Markers ==
Name	Category	Location	Established	Remarks	Coordinates	Image
41st Infantry Division Shrine	Monument	Tagaytay City, Cavite	Date	Monument commemorating the 41st Infantry Division under Gen. Vicente Lim. Tagaytay was the division's cantonment from September to December 1941, prior to their relocation to Bataan Peninsula.	14°05′45″N 120°56′21″E	
Philippine Army Artillery Memorial	Monument	Clark Freeport and Special Economic Zone, Mabalacat, Pampanga	2017	Original location of Camp Dau, established on March 10, 1937, under the leadership of Col. Fidel Segundo.	15°10′57″N 120°34′29″E	
Yahagi Memorial Cemetery	Monument	Don Pedro Subdivision, Marulas, Valenzuela	May 27, 1942	Originally erected in 1938 to commemorate the 48 crew members of the IJN Yahagi who were buried at the British Cemetery Manila (current location). During, the Japanese occupation, the Imperial Japanese Navy celebrated their Navy Day with the rededication of the monument.	14°40′48″N 120°58′34″E	
Philippine-Japanese Memorial Park	Park	New Bilibid Prison, Muntinlupa	Date	To commemorate the 17 Japanese POWs and war criminals executed by the Philippine Government from 1947 to 1952 after the war crimes trial in Manila.	14°22′30″N 121°01′35″E	
Japanese Garden	Shrine	Lumban, Laguna	January 14, 1973	To commemorate the Japanese, American, and Philippine casualties during WW2, specifically in Southern Luzon under the Shimbu Group.	14°17′01″N 121°30′38″E	
Jose Gozar Monument	Monument	Calapan Plaza, Calapan City, Oriental Mindoro	2018	Commemoration of Lt. Jose Gozar of the Philippine Army Air Corps, who received the Distinguished Service Cross for his attempt at aerial ramming of Japanese bombers on December 10, 1942.	13°24′53″N 121°10′45″E	
Tagudin Veterans Marker	Marker	Tagudin, Ilocos Sur		Marker commemorating the veterans of WWII from Tagudin, Ilocos Sur.	16°56′02″N 120°26′41″E	
Rosario Veterans Monument	Monument	Rosario, La Union		Monument commemorating the veterans of WWII from Rosario, La Union.	16°13′47″N 120°29′14″E	
Alcala Guerrilla Veterans Monument	Monument	Alcala, Pangasinan		Monument commemorating the veterans and guerrillas of WWII from Alcala, Pangasinan.	15°50′45″N 120°31′13″E	
Laur WWII Veterans Monument	Monument	Laur, Nueva Ecija		Monument commemorating the veterans and guerrillas of WWII from Laur, Nueva Ecija.	15°35′01″N 121°11′06″E	
Malolos Veterans Monument	Monument	Malolos, Bulacan		Monument commemorating the veterans of WWII from Malolos, Bulacan.	14°50′36″N 120°48′40″E	
Ususan Veterans Monument	Monument	Bgy. Ususan, Pateros, Metro Manila		Monument commemorating the veterans of WWII from Pateros, Metro Manila.	14°32′07″N 121°04′04″E	
Indang Veterans Monument	Monument	Indang, Cavite	2014	Monument commemorating the veterans of WWII from Indang, Cavite	14°12′10″N 120°50′25″E	
Naic Veterans Monument	Monument	Naic, Cavite	2014	Monument commemorating the veterans of WWII from Naic, Cavite	14°19′17″N 120°46′18″E	
Angono Veterans Memorial	Monument	Angono, Rizal		Monument commemorating the veterans and guerrillas of WWII from Angono, Rizal.	14°31′56″N 121°09′09″E	
Tanay Veterans Memorial	Monument	Tanay, Rizal		Monument commemorating the veterans and guerrillas of WWII from Tanay, Rizal.	14°30′00″N 121°17′02″E	
Famy-Siniloan Veterans Monument	Monument	Famy, Laguna		Monument commemorating the veterans of WWII from Siniloan, Laguna	14°26′07″N 121°26′57″E	
Pangil Veterans Monument	Monument	Pangil, Laguna		Monument commemorating the veterans of WWII from Pangil, Laguna	14°26′07″N 121°26′56″E	
Pakil Veterans Monument	Monument	Pakil, Laguna		Monument commemorating the veterans of WWII from Pakil, Laguna	14°22′49″N 121°28′43″E	
Paete Veterans Monument	Monument	Paete, Laguna		Monument commemorating the veterans of WWII from Paete, Laguna	14°21′52″N 121°28′53″E	
Pagsanjan Veterans Monument	Monument	Pagsanjan, Laguna		Monument commemorating the veterans of WWII from Pagsanjan, Laguna	14°16′22″N 121°27′21″E	
Calauan Veterans Monument	Monument	Calauan, Laguna		Monument commemorating the veterans of WWII from Calauan, Laguna	14°09′01″N 121°18′53″E	
Calamba Veterans Monument	Monument	Calamba, Laguna		Monument commemorating the veterans of WWII from Calamba, Laguna.	14°12′53″N 121°10′05″E	
Cavinti Veterans Monument	Monument	Cavinti, Laguna		Monument commemorating the veterans and guerrillas of WWII from Cavinti, Laguna.	14°14′31″N 121°30′53″E	
Tancong Vaca Guerrilla Unit Memorial	Monument	Bgy. San Nicolas, Canaman, Camarines Sur		Monument commemorating the Tancong Vaca Guerrilla Unit of Canaman, Camarines Sur..	13°39′05″N 123°06′09″E	
Granada Veterans Monument	Monument	Bgy. Granada, Bacolod, Negros Occidental		Monument commemorating the veterans and guerrillas of WWII from Bgy. Granada, Bacolod City.	10°39′58″N 123°02′02″E	
Battle of Mt. Kalisungan	Monument	Brgy. San Mateo, San Pablo City, Laguna	August 27, 2000	Monument commemorating the Battle of Mt. Kalisungan was the last Fil-Am uprising in the city of San Pablo against the Japanese Imperial Army	14.114167°N 121.300278°E	
Pinaglabanan Shrine- Battle of Sta. Isabel	Monument	Brgy. Sta Isabel, San Pablo City, Laguna	November 22, 1979	Monument commemorating the Battle of Sta Isabel, first Fil-Am uprising in the city of San Pablo against the invading Japanese Imperial Army	14.083333°N 121.351667°E	
Dambana ng Kagitingan -San Pablo WWII Veterans Memorial Shrine	Monument	San Pablo City, Laguna		Monument dedicated to the sons and daughters of San Pablo who fought against the Japanese during WWII	14.074444°N 121.325278°E	
Liberation of San Pablo City	Monument	San Pablo City, Laguna		Monument dedicated to the liberators of San Pablo City, Laguna		San Pablo City Highway Barangays Landmarks

== See also ==
- List of massacres in the Philippines
- Philippine War Crimes Commission
- World War II Philippine war crimes trials
