= Tarac =

Tarac may refer to:

- a karst rock-area island in Kornati archipelago in Croatia
- Mount Tarac, a volcanic mount adjacent to Mariveles Volcano in the Philippines
- Tarac Australia Limited, a South Australia company specialist in wine technologies
