= Subic Forest =

Protected forest in Luzon Island, Philippines

Coordinates: 14°39′N 120°36′E

The Subic Forest is a 10000 hectare national forest protected area that extends from Subic Bay National Park up the northwestern volcanic slope of Mount Natib in Bataan National Park in the Philippines. The forest was part of the Subic Naval base until 1992.

== Location ==
The Subic Forest is located on western Luzon island in Bataan, Central Luzon near the Angeles area east of Manila. It is in the Luzon Montane Rainforests Ecoregion.

== Flora and Fauna ==
The forest contain the flying fox Acederon jubatus and the Philippine fruit bat Pteropus vampyrus which are two of the largest bat species.

== See also ==
- Luzon tropical pine forests
- Tropical and subtropical moist broadleaf forests
