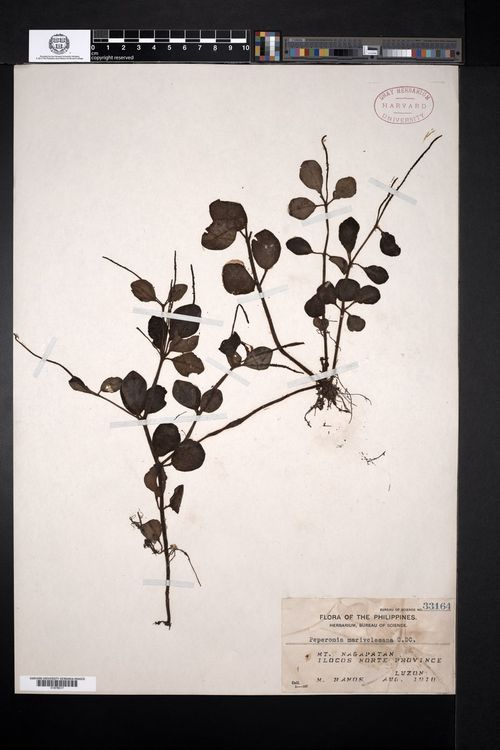

Scientific classification
- Kingdom: Plantae
- Clade: Tracheophytes
- Clade: Angiosperms
- Clade: Magnoliids
- Order: Piperales
- Family: Piperaceae
- Genus: Peperomia
- Species: P. marivelesana

Binomial name
- Peperomia marivelesana C.DC.

= Peperomia marivelesana =

Species of flowering plant

Peperomia marivelesana is a species of epiphyte in the genus Peperomia that is endemic in Philippines. It grows on wet tropical biomes. Its conservation status is Threatened.

== Description ==
The type specimen were collected near Bataan, Philippines, at an altitude of 2,000 ft (610 m).

Peperomia marivelesana has leaves that are elliptic lance shaped, narrowed at both base and tip, with three veins, smooth on top and not densely hairy underneath, with hairy leaf stalks. Flower stalks grow from the leaf axils, three times longer than the leaf stalks, thin and smooth. Flower spikes are smooth and at maturity equal the leaf blades in length. The bract is circular with a very short stalk at the center. Anthers are elliptic. The ovary emerges above the flower, is egg shaped, and bears the stigma slightly below the tip. The stigma is dot shaped and smooth. The berry is round, scattered with small glands, and lacks a false cupule.

It is a fleshy creeping herb. Stem and branches are densely rough haired. Branches are 1 mm thick when dried. Leaves are alternate or opposite. Leaf blades are papery when dried, with transparent dots, up to 26 mm long and 20 mm wide. Leaf stalks are up to 8 mm long. Flowering spikes are 15 mm long and 1 mm thick. Bracts are shield shaped and 1.25 mm in diameter. Filaments are shorter than the anthers.

== Taxonomy and naming ==
It was described in 1910 by Casimir de Candolle in Leaflets of Philippine Botany 3, from specimens collected by Adolph D. E. Elmer. It got its name from location where the type specimen was collected.

== Distribution and habitat ==
It is endemic in Philippines. It grows on a epiphyte environment and is a herb. It grows on wet tropical biomes.

== Conservation ==
This species is assessed as Threatened, in a preliminary report.
