= General Hayashi =

General Hayashi may refer to:

- Keizō Hayashi (1907–1991), Japan Self-Defense Forces general
- Senjūrō Hayashi (1876–1943), Imperial Japanese Army general
- Yoshihide Hayashi (1891–1978), Imperial Japanese Army lieutenant general
