= Bataan National Park =

National park in the Philippines

- IUCN category II (national park)
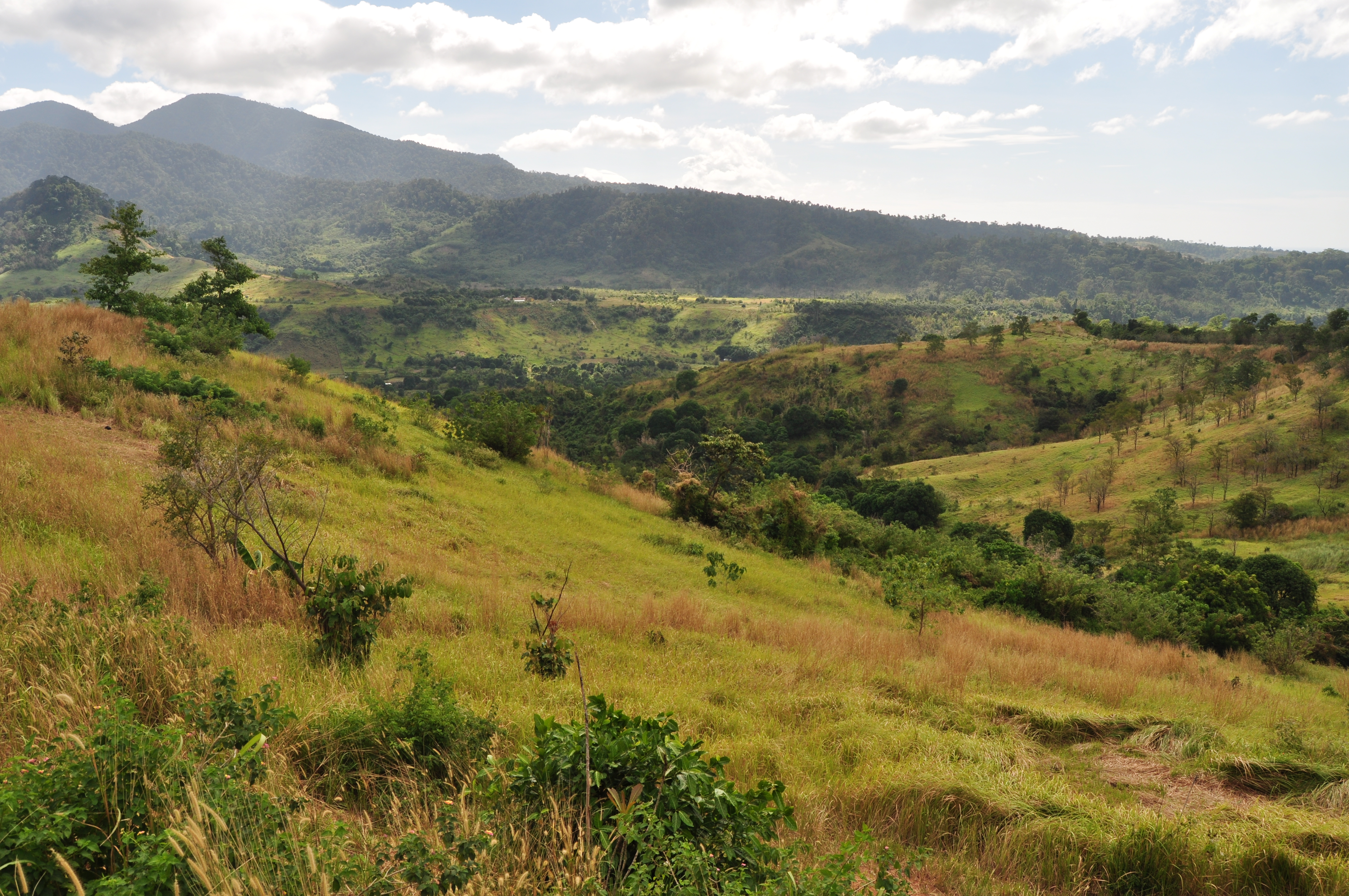
- Bataan National Park near Mabayo in Morong, Bataan

- Location within Luzon Location within Philippines
- Location: Bataan, Philippines
- Nearest city: Balanga
- Coordinates: 14°39′N 120°36′E
- Area: 23,688 hectares (58,530 acres)
- Established: December 1, 1945; 80 years ago
- Governing body: Department of Environment and Natural Resources

Bataan National Park is a protected area of the Philippines located in the mountainous interior of Bataan in the Central Luzon region. Activities in the park include nature viewing, birdwatching, and trekking to its several peaks and waterfalls.

== History ==
The park was first established in 1945 under Proclamation No. 24 with an initial area of 31,000 hectares (77,000 acres) and included portions of the fenced area of Subic Bay Freeport Zone. The park was reduced in 1987 to its present area of 23,688 ha (58,530 acres) and is now wholly located in Bataan.

== Geography ==
The park is located 101 km (63 mi) from Manila; its mountains can be seen across Manila Bay from the city. It straddles the northern half of Bataan Peninsula near its border with Subic Bay Freeport Zone, encompassing the municipalities of Hermosa, Orani, Samal, Abucay, Bagac, and Morong and the city of Balanga. Mount Natib, with its 6 by 7 km (3.7 by 4.3 mi) forested, acorn-shaped caldera, is located in the middle of the park.

=== Environment ===
Bataan National Park is covered by tropical jungle on rugged terrain with significant geological features such as rivers, springs and waterfalls. Pasukulan and Dunsulan falls are found within the park, as are important species of flowers and ground orchids. It is also home to several wild monkeys and other varieties of insects and birds. It has been designated an Important Bird Area (IBA) by BirdLife International.

== See also ==
- Zambales Mountains
- Subic Forest
- List of national parks of the Philippines
