= Mount Samat National Shrine =

World War II shrine complex in Bataan, Philippines

- Shrine of Valor
- Dambana ng Kagitingan
- The shrine in May 2023

- Location within Luzon Location within Philippines
- Type: Memorial
- Location: Pilar, Bataan, Philippines
- Coordinates: 14°36′20.80″N 120°30′32.17″E
- Area: 73,665 hectares (182,030 acres)
- Created: 1970
- Operator: Tourism Infrastructure and Enterprise Zone Authority; Philippine Veterans Affairs Office
- Open: All year round
- Status: National Shrine; April 8, 1967

The Mount Samat National Shrine (Tagalog pronunciation: [samat]), also known as the Shrine of Valor (Filipino: Dambana ng Kagitingan), is a historical shrine located near the summit of Mount Samat in Pilar, Bataan, Philippines. The memorial complex was built to honor and remember the gallantry of Filipino and American soldiers who fought against the Imperial Japanese Army during World War II.

Comprising a colonnade and the large Memorial Cross, the park was commissioned in 1966 by President Ferdinand Marcos to commemorate the 25th anniversary of World War II. The white Memorial Cross stands as a remembrance of the soldiers who fought and lost their lives in the Battle of Bataan. The shrine complex also includes a war museum featuring a wide array of collections, from paintings of Philippine heroes to armaments used by Filipino, American, and Japanese forces during the battle.

From the colonnade and the cross, there is a panoramic view of Bataan, the island of Corregidor, and, on a clear day, the city of Manila, located about 50 kilometers (31 mi) across Manila Bay.

== History ==
Along with the fortified island of Corregidor, Mount Samat was the site of the most vicious battle against the Japanese Imperial Army in 1942 during the Battle of Bataan. Suffering heavy losses against the Japanese all over Luzon, Filipino and American soldiers retreated to Bataan Peninsula to regroup for a last valiant but futile stand. This retreat to Bataan is part of a United States strategy known as War Plan Orange.

Bataan fell after three months of fighting when 78,000 exhausted, sick and starving men under Major General Edward P. King surrendered to the Japanese on April 9, 1942. It is the single largest surrender of U.S. soldiers in history. Together with the Philippine soldiers, they were then led on the Bataan Death March.

The scene of their last stronghold is Mount Samat, the site of Dambana ng Kagitingan. The shrine was conceived as a fitting memorial to the heroic struggle and sacrifices of the soldiers who fought and died in that historic bastion of freedom. As such, it is also used for religious purposes where Lenten pilgrimages are made and the Diocese of Balanga's annual Mount Samat Pilgrimage is held in November or December before first Sunday of Advent since the tenure of Socrates Villegas as the diocese's third bishop, except in 2010, the first under Villegas' successor Ruperto Santos as the diocese's fourth bishop, and 2024 where the former held on December 11 and pilgrimage was not celebrated due to having no Bishop of Balanga yet and available person to preside the celebration on that year for the latter, respectively.

The memorial shrine complex was started with the laying of the cornerstone by President Marcos on April 14, 1966. Due to lack of funds, construction was unfinished for the 25th anniversary of the Fall of Bataan in 1967. The shrine was completed and inaugurated in 1970, in time for the 25th anniversary of the end of World War II.

== Architectural features ==
Located in an area approximately 73,665 hectares (182,030 acres), the park consists mainly of the Colonnade and at the mountain's peak, the Memorial Cross. The shrine was designed by Lorenzo del Castillo and landscaped by Dolly Quimbo-Pérez.

=== Colonnade ===
Interior

From the parking lot, three series of wide steps narrows to the top, where a flagpole hoists the flag of the Philippines. The last flight of steps to the Colonnade are flanked on each side by two pedestals, topped with bronze urns symbolising an eternal flame.

The Colonnade is a marble-clad structure surrounded by an esplanade, itself surrounded by marble-clad parapets. The outer side is covered with 19 high relief sculptures by National Artist Napoleón Abueva, and alternates depending on the war with 18 bronze insignia of USAFFE Division units by Talleres de Máximo Vicente, Leonides Váldez, and Ángel Sampra and Sons. Each bronze insignia has a flagstaff for the flags of each division.

In the centre of the Colonnade is an altar, behind which are three religious stained glass murals designed by Cenon Rivera and executed by Vetrate D'Arte Giuliani of Rome, Italy. Four large bronze chandeliers hang from the ceiling, while inscribed in marble on the two lateral walls is a narrative of the “Battle of Bataan”.

Behind the Colonnade is a footpath leading to the base of the Memorial Cross. The 14-flight, zig-zagging path on the mountain slope is paved with bloodstones from Corregidor Island. An alternate road also gives access to the base of the Memorial Cross.

=== Memorial Cross ===
Dambana ng Kagitingan Memorial Cross
- Shrine of Valor Memorial Cross
- Interactive map of Dambana ng Kagitingan; Memorial Cross
- Location: Pilar, Bataan, Philippines
- Designer: Lorenzo del Castillo and Napoleon Abueva
- Type: Historical landmark
- Material: Steel and reinforced concrete finished with chipped granolithic marble
- Length: 90 feet (27 m)
- Width: 18 feet (5.5 m)
- Height: 92 metres (302 ft)
- Beginning date: 1966
- Completion date: 1970
- Opening date: 1970
- Dedicated to: Soldiers who fought for freedom in the Battle of Bataan

The Memorial Cross is located at the highest point of Mount Samat, 555 m (1,821 ft) above sea level. The monument is made of steel and reinforced concrete with a lift and viewing gallery at the Cross's arms. A staircase also leads to the gallery in the wings. The height of the Cross is 95 m (312 ft) from the base; the height of the arms is 74 m (243 ft) m from the base, with each arm measuring 30 m (98 ft) (15 m (49 ft) on each side), making it the second tallest cross in the world. The viewing gallery is 5.5 m × 27.4 m (18 ft × 90 ft), with a 2.1 m (6.9 ft) clearance.

The exterior of the Cross is finished with chipped granolithic marble. The base until the 11 m (36 ft) level is capped with sculptural slabs and a relief titled Nabiag Na Bato also by Napoleón Abueva, depicting important historical figures and events like the execution of José Rizal, Lapu-Lapu and Antonio Luna.

== Gallery ==
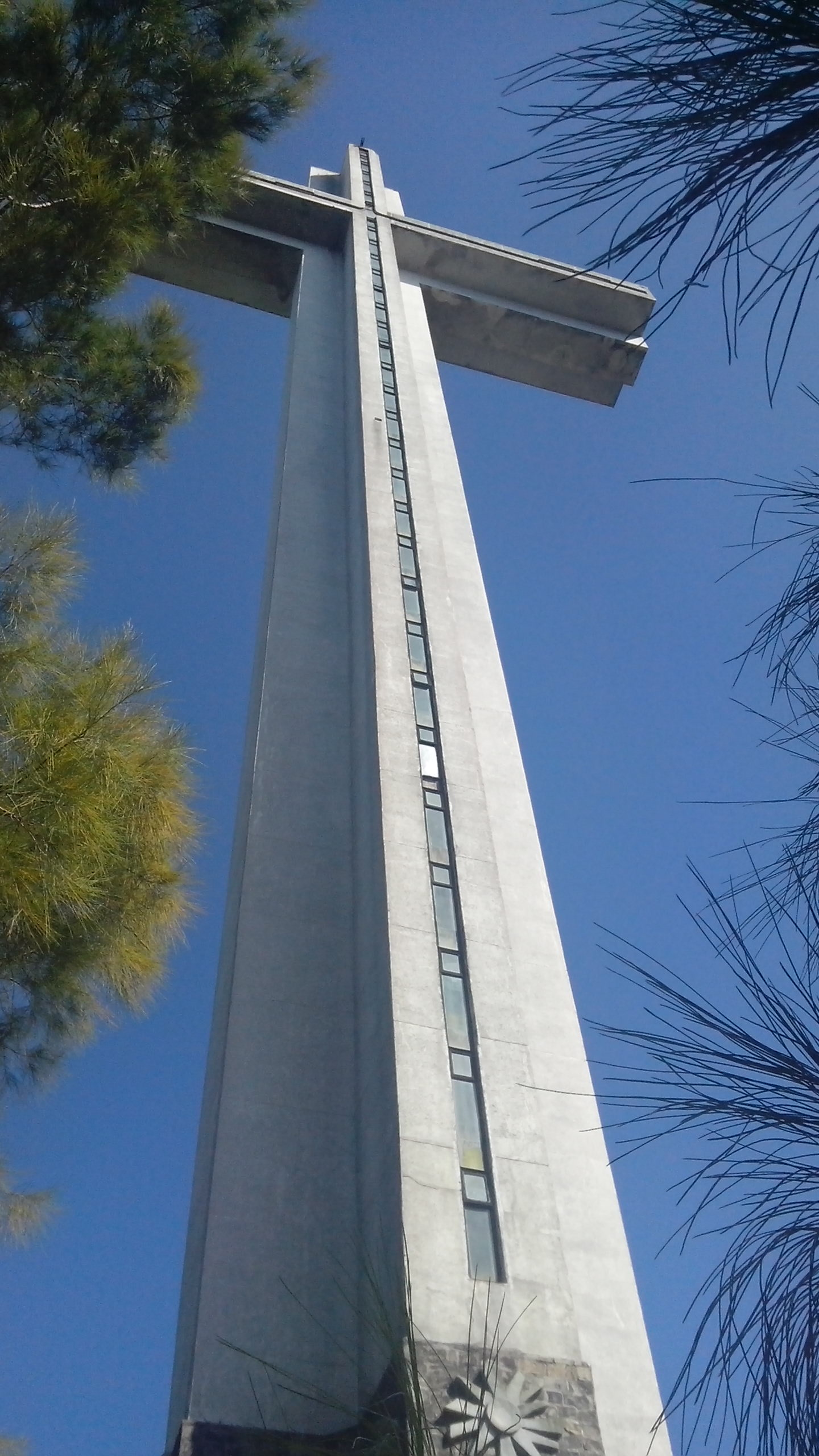
The War Memorial Cross

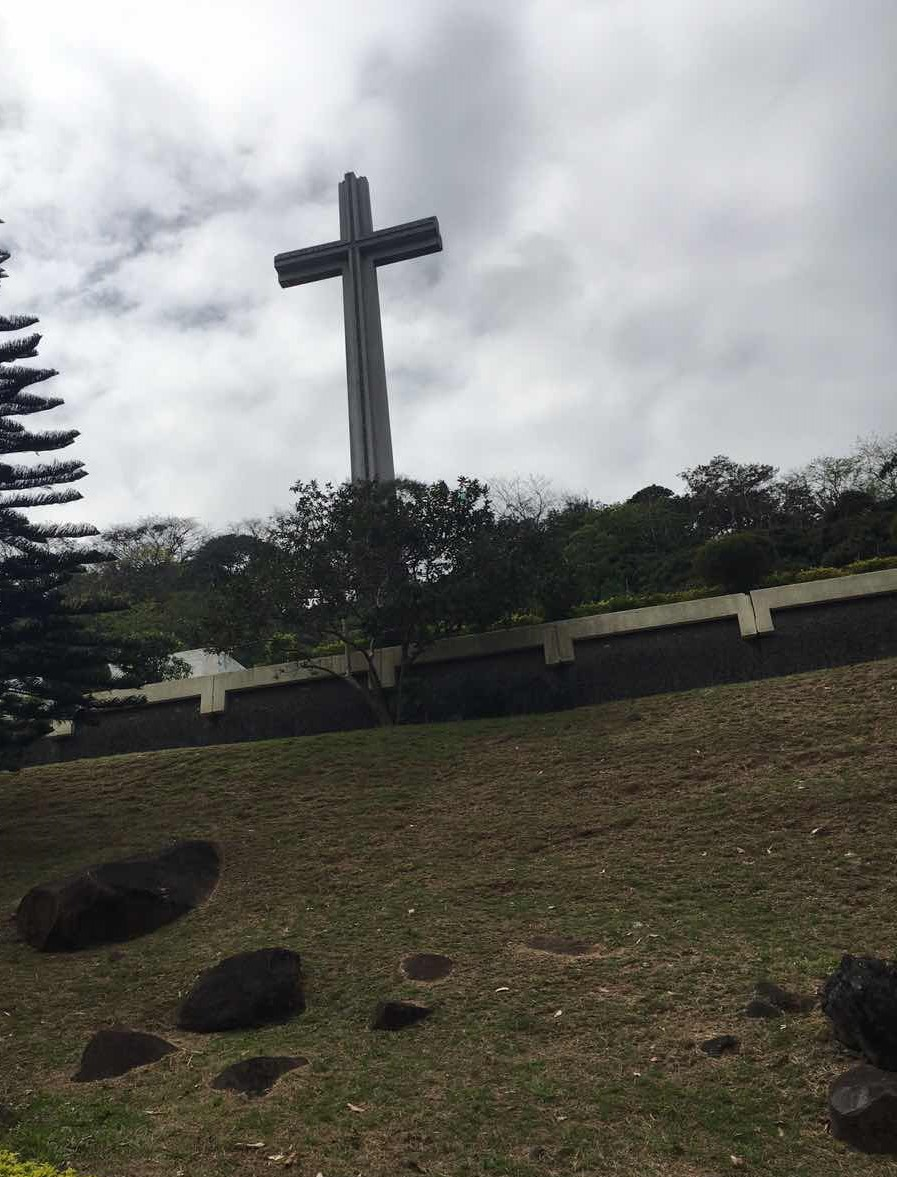
The National Shrine in February 2017.
