= Mount Samat =

Mountain in Bataan, Philippines

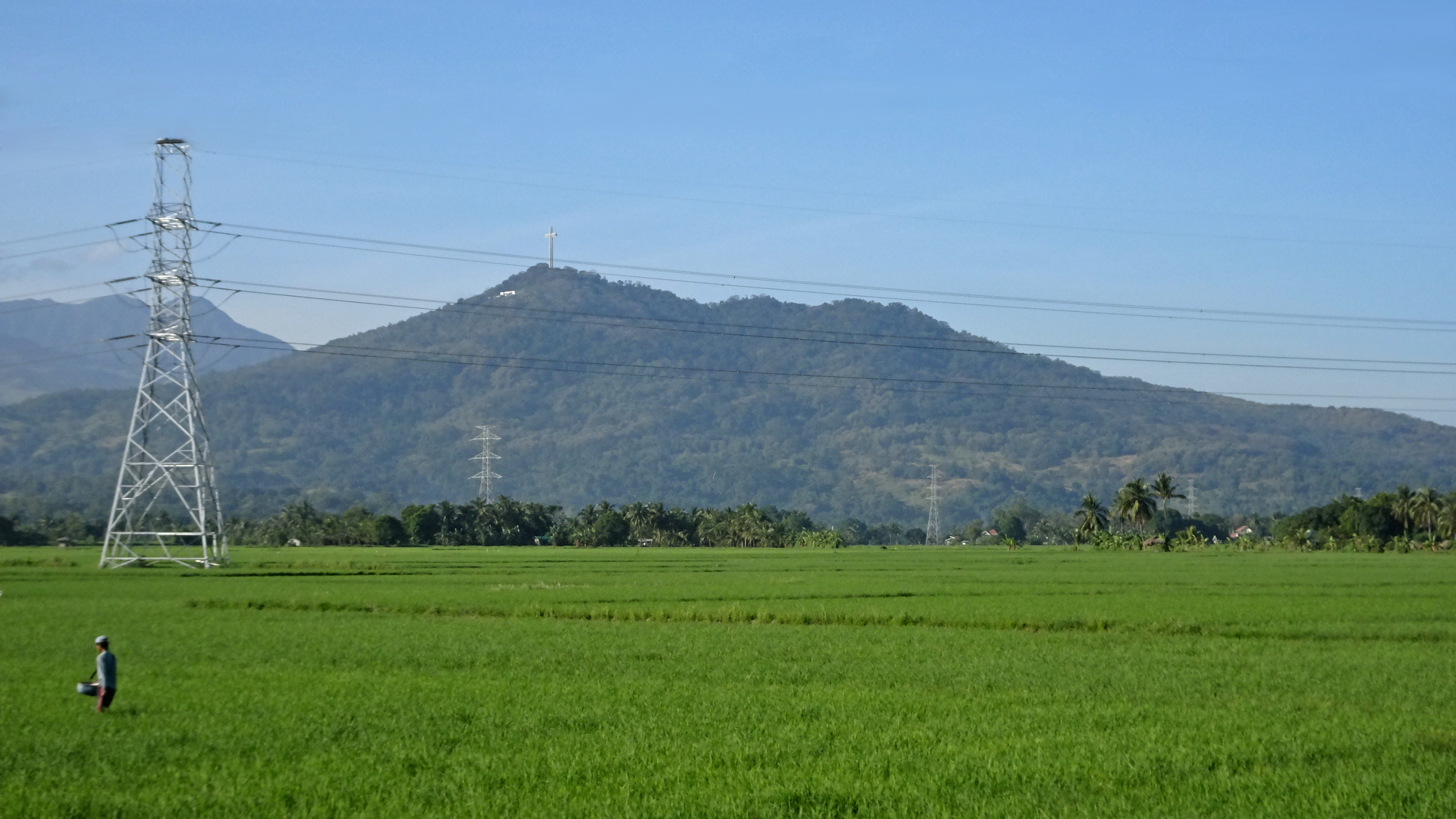
- Mount Samat remote view

Highest point
- Elevation: 560 m (1,840 ft)
- Prominence: 218 m (715 ft)
- Parent peak: Mount Mariveles
- Coordinates: 14°36′15.4″N 120°30′27.3″E

Geography
- Location within Luzon Location within Philippines
- Location: Luzon
- Country: Philippines
- Region: Central Luzon
- Province: Bataan
- Municipality: Pilar
- Parent range: Zambales Mountains

Geology
- Mountain type: Extinct volcano
- Volcanic zone: Western Bataan Lineament
- Last eruption: Unknown

Climbing
- Easiest route: Mt. Samat Road

Mount Samat (Tagalog pronunciation: [samat]) is a mountain in the town of Pilar, Bataan, Philippines. Located near its summit is the Mount Samat National Shrine, a national shrine dedicated to the fallen Filipino and American fallen during World War II.

== Geology ==
Mount Samat is a parasitic cone of Mount Mariveles with no record of historical eruption. The summit of Mount Samat is 9.2 km (5.7 mi) NNE of the Mariveles caldera. Mount Samat itself has a 550-metre (1,800 ft) wide crater that opens to the northeast. The Mount Samat Cross is situated near the edge of the crater rim.

== Historical significance ==
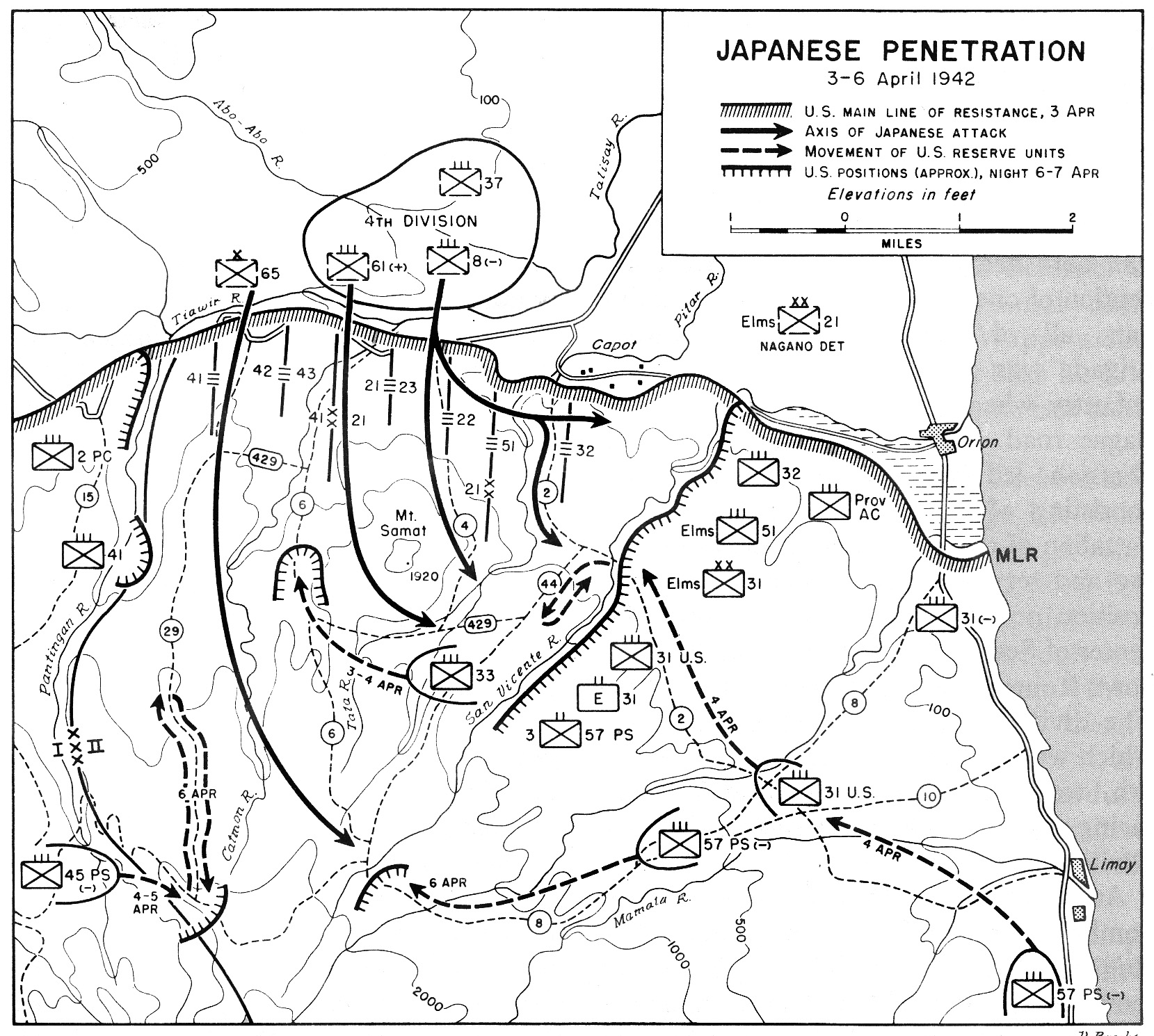
Japanese breakthrough of the Orion-Bagac Line April 1942

At the start of World War II in 1942 after suffering heavy losses against the Imperial Japanese Army all over Luzon, the Filipino and American soldiers retreated to Bataan Peninsula to regroup for a last valiant but futile stand. After four months of fighting, the 78,000 exhausted, sick and starving soldiers under Major General Edward P. King surrendered to the Japanese on April 9, 1942, known as the fall of Bataan. It is the single largest surrender of U.S. soldiers in history and Mariveles, a town in the Bataan province, was their last stronghold after which, together with the Philippine soldiers, they were led on to the 80-mile (130 km) march to Capas, Tarlac known as the Bataan Death March.

The Mount Samat National Shrine was erected as a memorial to the Filipino and American soldiers who fought against the Imperial Japanese Army in World War II.

== Dunsulan Falls ==
Dunsulan Falls (14°36′52.7″N 120°29′33.8″E) is a waterfall located at the foot of Mount Samat, northeast of the National Shrine in Brgy Liyang, also in Pilar town. Dunsulan falls and river is the main drainage on the crater side of Mount Samat.

== Gallery ==
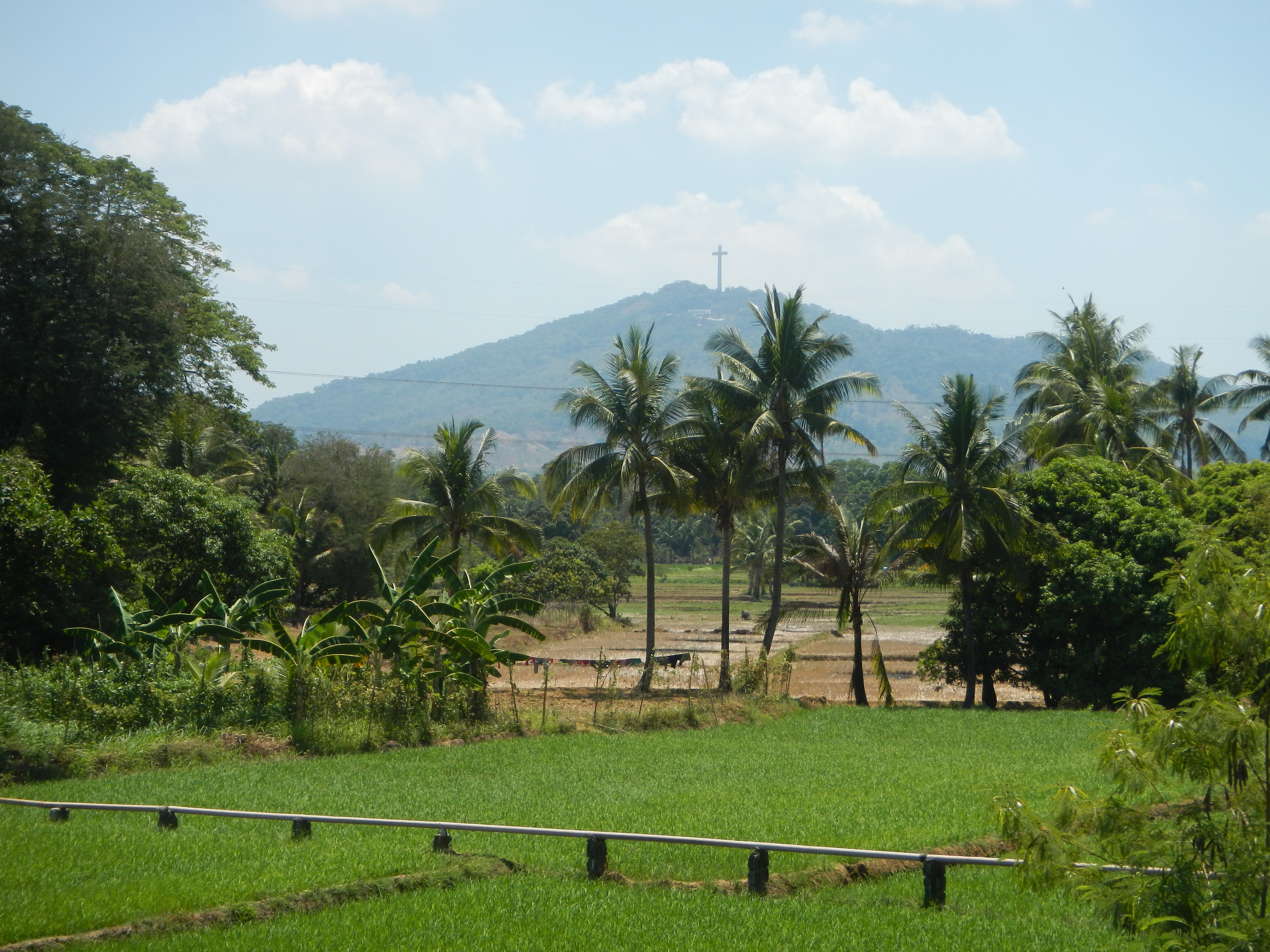
Mount Samat viewed from Orion, Bataan

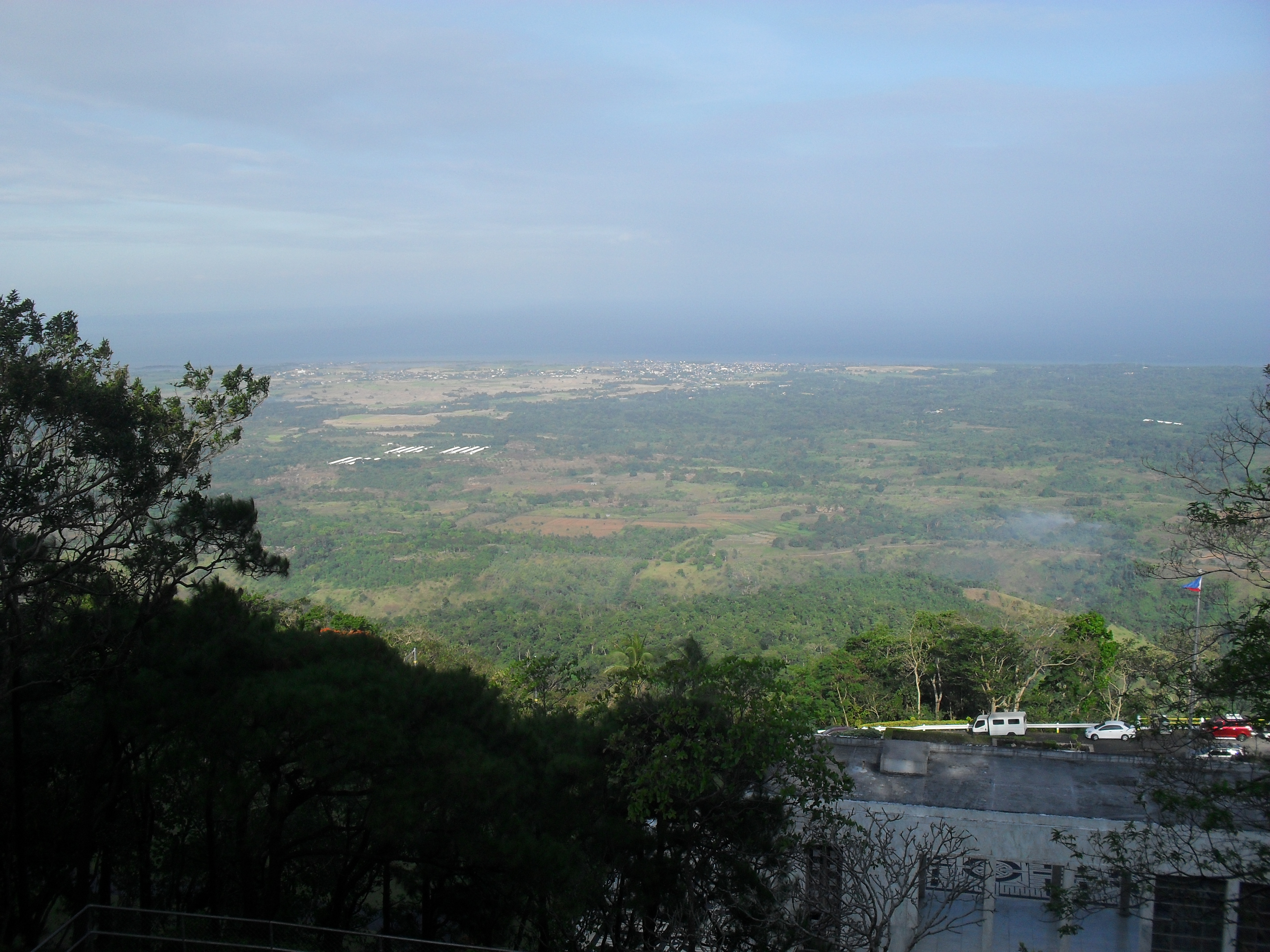
View from Mount Samat

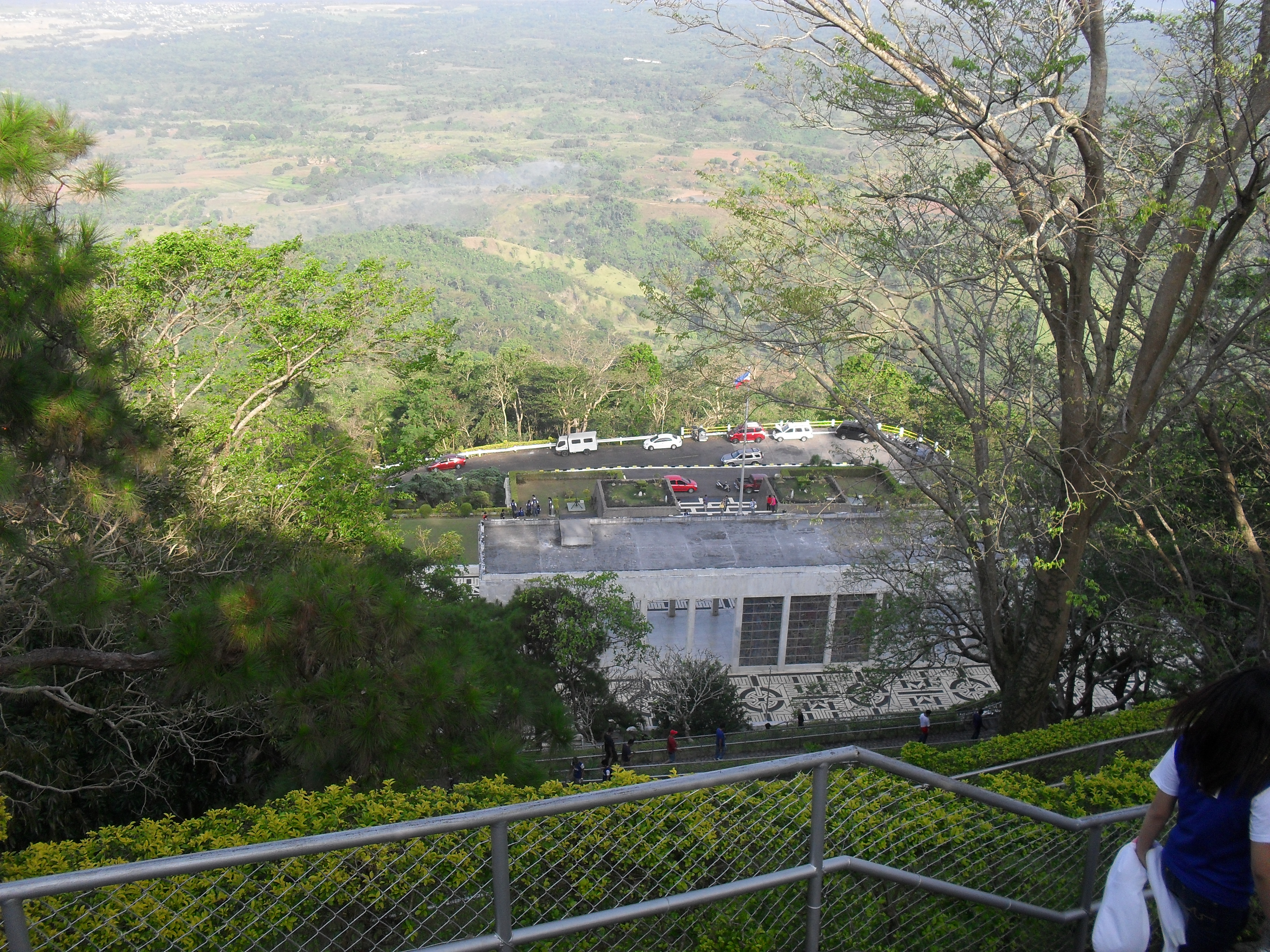
Steep pathway leading to the Shrine's Memorial Cross
