= Yoshihide Hayashi =

Japanese general (1891–1978)

- 林 義秀
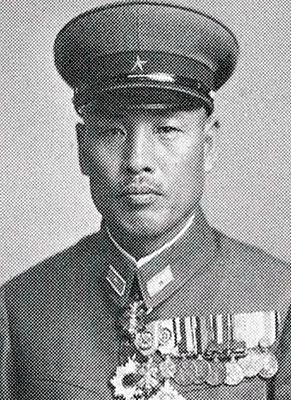
- Born: August 25, 1891; Wakayama, Japan
- Died: February 5, 1978 (aged 86)
- Education: Imperial Japanese Army Academy; Army Staff College
- Military career
- Allegiance: Empire of Japan
- Branch: Imperial Japanese Army
- Service years: 1914–1945
- Rank: Lieutenant general
- Units: Kwantung Army; IJA 14th Area Army
- Commands: Taiwan Army Research Section; IJA 54th Division; IJA 53rd Division
- Conflicts: Second Sino-Japanese War; Operation Chahar; World War II; Burma campaign

Yoshihide Hayashi (林 義秀, Hayashi Yoshihide; August 25, 1891 – February 5, 1978) was a lieutenant general in the Imperial Japanese Army during World War II.

== Career ==
A native of Wakayama Prefecture, Hayashi was a graduate of the 26th class of the Imperial Japanese Army Academy in 1914, and of the 35th class of the Army Staff College in 1923.

At the outset of the Second Sino-Japanese War, he was assigned to the Kwantung Army, and was on the planning team for the successful Operation Chahar in northern China. From 1938-1940, Hayashi served with the garrison forces in Taiwan.

In 1940, during the preparations for the invasion of Southeast Asia, Hayashi was put in command of the Taiwan Army Research Section, tasked with investigating issues with tropical warfare. He was promoted to major general in 1941. From 1941-1942, Hayashi was Vice Chief of Staff of the IJA 14th Area Army.

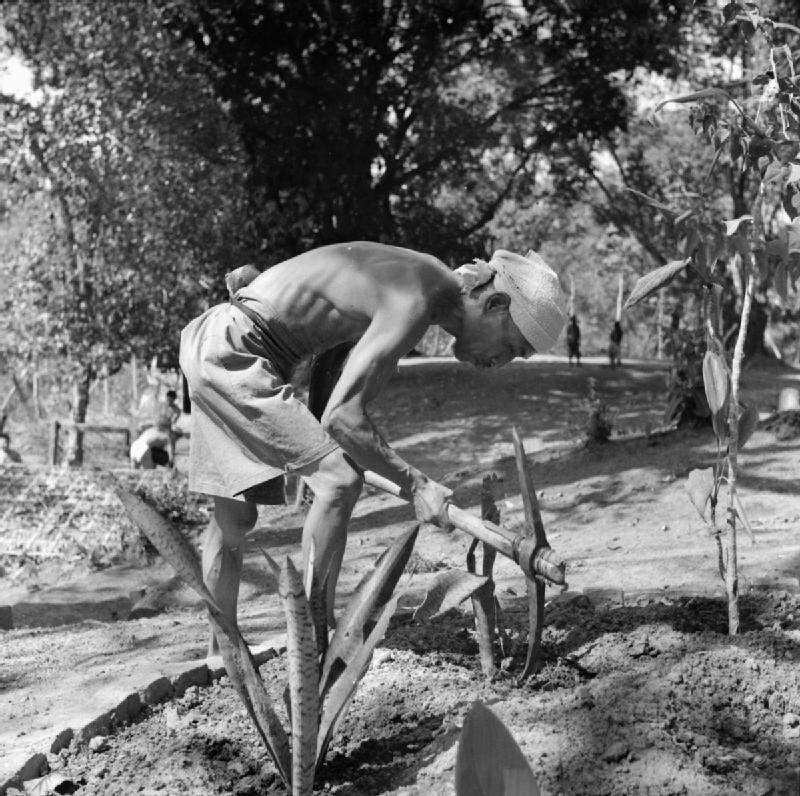
Hayashi tending a garden during his imprisonment on suspicion of war crimes

He was given a field command in 1943, when he was assigned command of the IJA 54th Division. In 1943-5, Hayashi was commander of the IJA 24th Independent Mixed Brigade in Burma. He became commander of the IJA 53rd Division in Burma in 1945. He was promoted to lieutenant-general in 1945. After the surrender of Japan, he was held for investigation of possible war crimes and incarcerated at the New Bilibid Prison in the Philippines. He pleaded guilty to war crimes at the Philippine War Crimes Trial, including to his role in the murder of Chief Justice José Abad Santos. Hayashi was sentenced to life in prison. During his incarceration, he lost a drastic amount of weight, as captured in contemporary photos. On July 4, 1953, he, along with 113 other Japanese war criminals were pardoned by President Elpidio Quirino.
