= Mount Natib =

Dormant stratovolcano in Bataan, Philippines

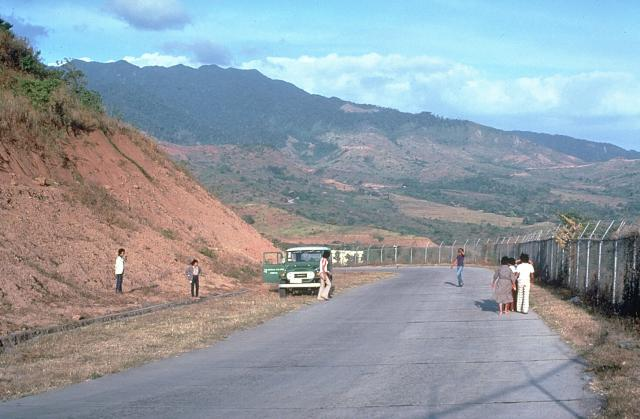
- Mt. Natib as viewed from WSW

Highest point
- Elevation: 1,253 m (4,111 ft)
- Prominence: 1,121 m (3,678 ft)
- Listing: Potentially active volcano Ribu
- Coordinates: 14°43′N 120°24′E

Geography
- Location within Philippines
- Location: Bataan Peninsula, Luzon
- Country: Philippines
- Region: Central Luzon
- Province: Bataan
- Parent range: Zambales Mountains

Geology
- Rock age: Pliocene to Pleistocene
- Mountain type: Stratovolcano-Caldera
- Volcanic arc: Luzon Volcanic Arc
- Last eruption: Unknown, est. upper Pleistocene to Holocene

Mount Natib /nɑːˈtiːb/ is a dormant stratovolcano and caldera complex in the Zambales Mountains on western Luzon Island of the Philippines. Occupying the northern portion of the Bataan Peninsula, the mountain and adjacent surrounding is a protected area first declared as the Bataan National Park in 1945.

== Physical features ==
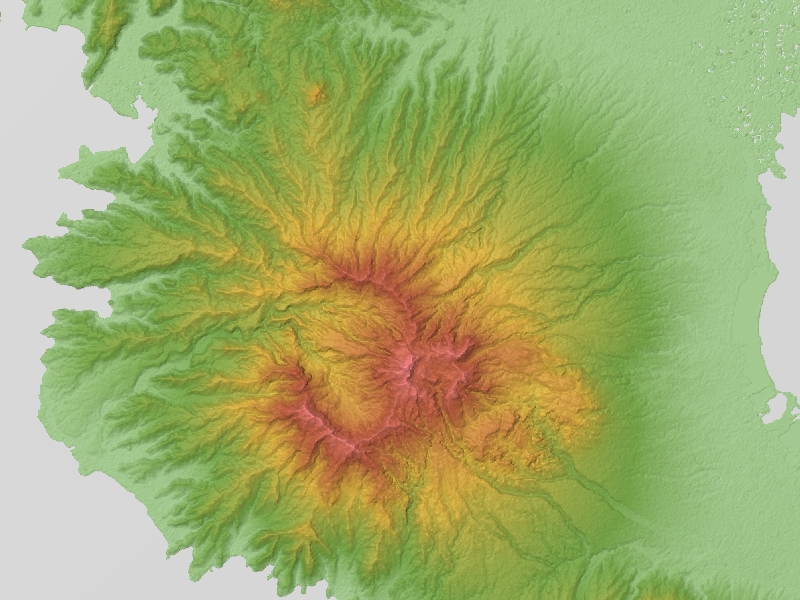
Relief map

Mount Natib is a stratovolcano type of volcano topped by a 6-by-7-kilometre (3.7 by 4.3 mi) acorn-shaped Natib Caldera that is open to the northwest. East of its caldera is the smaller 2-kilometre (1.2 mi) wide Pasukulan Caldera. The highest peak of Mount Natib has an elevation of 1,253 metres (4,111 ft) asl and is at the point of convergence of the two calderas. The caldera complex has an overall base diameter of 26 kilometres (16 mi).

== Volcanic activity ==
There are no historical eruptions within the Natib caldera complex. A study in 1991 indicated that the last eruptive activity was probably Holocene to upper Pleistocene. An earlier study in 1971 by Ebasco Services dated the eruptive products between 69,000 +/- 27,000 years old. A recent study by Dr. Kevin Rodolfo of the Department of Earth and Environmental Sciences at the University of Illinois at Chicago, had Mount Natib's latest eruption between 11,000 and 18,000 years ago after studying a prehistoric pyroclastic flow from the volcano that entered Subic Bay in Zambales province. Current activity on Natib is through five thermal areas. The hot springs in the Natib caldera are Asin, Mamot, Tigulangin, Uyong, and Paipit springs. The hot springs have temperatures ranging from 30-56 °C, with low flows, and a neutral to slightly alkaline water discharge.

The Philippine Institute of Volcanology and Seismology (PHIVOLCS) lists Mount Natib as a potentially active volcano.

== Geology ==
The rocks found on Natib are predominantly biotite, hornblende, andesite, trending to dacite flows and dacitic tuffs, which are similar to Mount Mariveles, the southern half of the Bataan Peninsula.

Natib is part of the Western Bataan Lineament volcanic belt, which includes the active Mount Pinatubo.

== See also ==
- List of active volcanoes in the Philippines
- List of potentially active volcanoes in the Philippines
- List of inactive volcanoes in the Philippines
- Pacific Ring of Fire
