= World War II Philippine war crimes trials =

Between 1947 and 1949, 73 trials were conducted by the newly independent Republic of the Philippines against 155 members of the Imperial Japanese Army and Navy who committed war crimes during the Japanese occupation of the Philippines. This resulted in the conviction of 138 individuals and the death sentence of 79 by December 28, 1949. The trials became a political showcase of the Philippines in the international community to conduct a fair trial against war crimes.

== Background ==
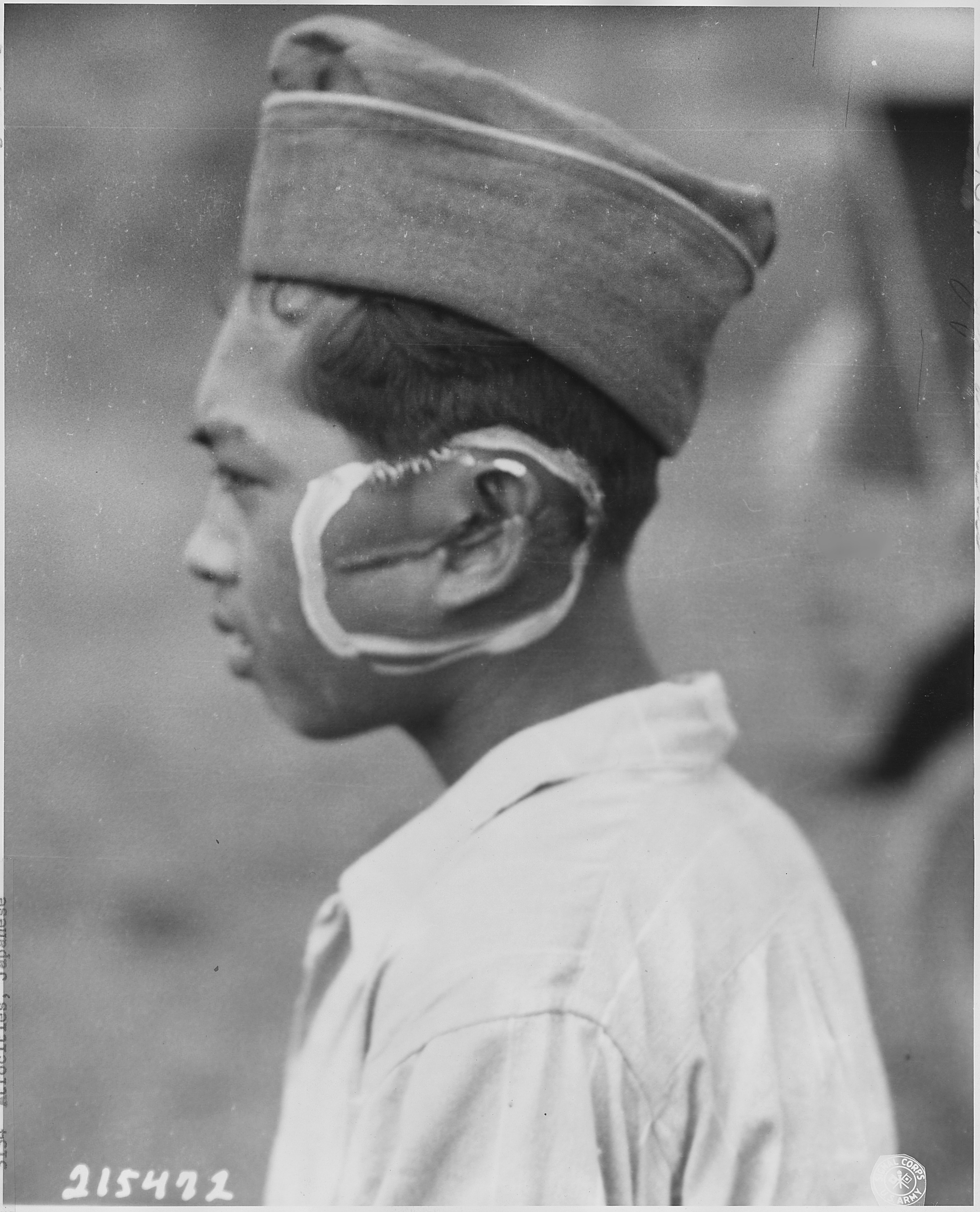
A scar on the face and ear of a young Filipino boy, the result of mutilation inflicted by Japanese soldiers

Upon the surrender of Japan in September 1945, Japanese forces which retreated into the mountain areas of the Philippines under Gen. Tomoyuki Yamashita laid down their arms and surrendered to American and Philippine authorities. Some 45,000 Japanese were then held as Prisoners of War in a number of camps, and were retained by reconstituted government of the Philippine Commonwealth for labor and rebuilding efforts. These were composed of 15,000 Japanese civilians, and 30,000 Japanese military personnel. Estimates of the suffering of the Filipinos were US$1 billion of damages to property, and 1 million deaths. The Philippines demanded $8 billion from Japan as reparation for the war.

Following Japan's defeat and occupation by the Allies, the Supreme Commander of the Allied Powers (SCAP), General Douglas MacArthur, issued a special proclamation establishing the International Military Tribunal for the Far East (IMTFE). This were to put on trial the Class A war criminals. In Manila two Class B accused war criminals had their trial, Gen. Tomoyuki Yamashita and Gen. Masaharu Homma. While their trials were ongoing MacArthur already initiated the establishment of the Philippine War Crimes Commission (PWCC) to investigate Class B and C war crimes committed in the country. From 1945 to mid 1947, the Armed Forces Western Pacific (AFWESPAC) was the convening authority in appointing for the military commission, reviewing of the sentences, and maintained the custody of the suspects. By July 1946 the PWCC's role was taken over by the SCAP Legal Section/Manila Branch.

SCAP conducted more than a hundred trials of Class B and Class C war criminals in Manila, resulting to 90% conviction and 69 executions, including those of Gen. Yamashita and Gen. Homma.

Meanwhile, President Sergio Osmeña established the National War Crimes Office (NWCO) in August 1945 to do parallel and complimentary investigation and collect evidence of the war crimes committed across the archipelago. The NWCO was tasked to work closely with the Philippine War Crimes Commission to bring to justice those secondary war criminals. From 1945 to July 1947, the American authorities put on trial 97 individuals in Manila, with 90% conviction and 92 of these were sentenced to death, which ended in 67 of them executed.

In early 1947, the SCAP Legal Section were already outlining the turn over of the responsibility of managing the subsequent trials of Class B and C accused. The Philippine government in turn was apprehensive given the cost of conducting the trials, as well as being distracted by the Hukbalahap rebellion. In subsequent meetings, the agreement was for the US authorities to retain the custody and cost of detaining the accused, their eventual transfer to Japan if released, while the Philippine authorities would cover the cost of the actual trails themselves.

On July 29, 1947, President Manuel Roxas signed Executive Order No. 68, establishing a new National War Crimes Office, which would be under the Judge Advocate General of the Philippine Army, "to collect from all available sources evidence of war crimes committed in the Philippines from the commencement of hostilities by Japan in December, 1941, maintain a record thereof, and bring about the prompt trial of the accused." The NWCO was tasked to form a military tribunal which would have jurisdiction over individuals who were involved:

1. Planning, preparation, initiation, and the waging of war of aggression and violation of international laws;
2. Violation of the laws or customs of war;
3. Murder, extermination, enslavement, deportation and other inhuman acts committed against civilian populations before or during the war.

The Executive Order also outlined the members of the tribunal, prosecutors, the terms and conduct, as well as the rights of the accused. It worked closely with the AFWESAC and SCAP Legal Section/Manila Branch as it took over their responsibility to put on trial Class B and C accused.

== Military tribunal ==
=== Preparation ===
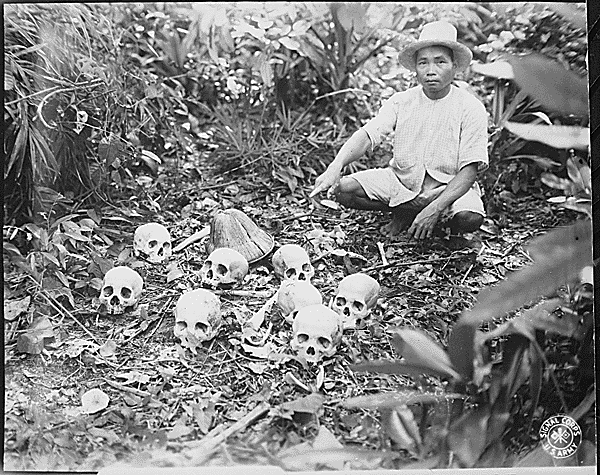
Pedro Cerono who uncovered 8 skulls of the victims of the Tapel massacre by members of the Imperial Japanese Army in Cagayan Province.

As soon as the American-lead trials were concluded in Manila in July 1947 the Philippine authorities took over the responsibility in putting to trial the remainder of the Class B and C war criminals. The Philippine Army tribunal was convened in the present day location of SM City Manila behind the Philippine Normal School.

The NWCO was initially headed by Eleuterio Fojas, but he was later succeeded by Mariano Yanko, on the demise of Fojas in 1948. The Prosecution Department was headed by Capt. Nicanor Maronilla-Seva, while the Defense Department was headed by Pedro Serran. The NWCO was also assisted by two American lawyers who coordinated with the SCAP Legal Section/Manila Branch.

=== Commencement ===
The first trial began on August 1, 1947, with the accused Chusiro Kudo, who was also known as the "Butcher of Bay" who permitted his subordinates to murder and torture some residents of the town of Bay in Laguna province. Kudo was initially represented by Philippine military lawyers, but was replaced upon the arrival of Japanese lawyers. These Japanese lawyers did not last long, and by the end of 1947 all but one remained in Manila, after facing difficulty and in one incident of a number of them mauling Capt. Maronilla-Seva outside of the court.

Additional difficulty faced during the trial was the need for the Japanese accused to secure witnesses from Japan. This led to the establishment of the Philippine War Crimes Investigation and Coordination Panel in Tokyo early 1948, headed by Capt. Ambrosio Dolette with the assistance of three Japanese lawyers, interpreters, and clerks. They coordinated with the SCAP Legal Section Tokyo to secure the Japanese witnesses and get their deposition for the use of the Defense and Prosecution in Manila.

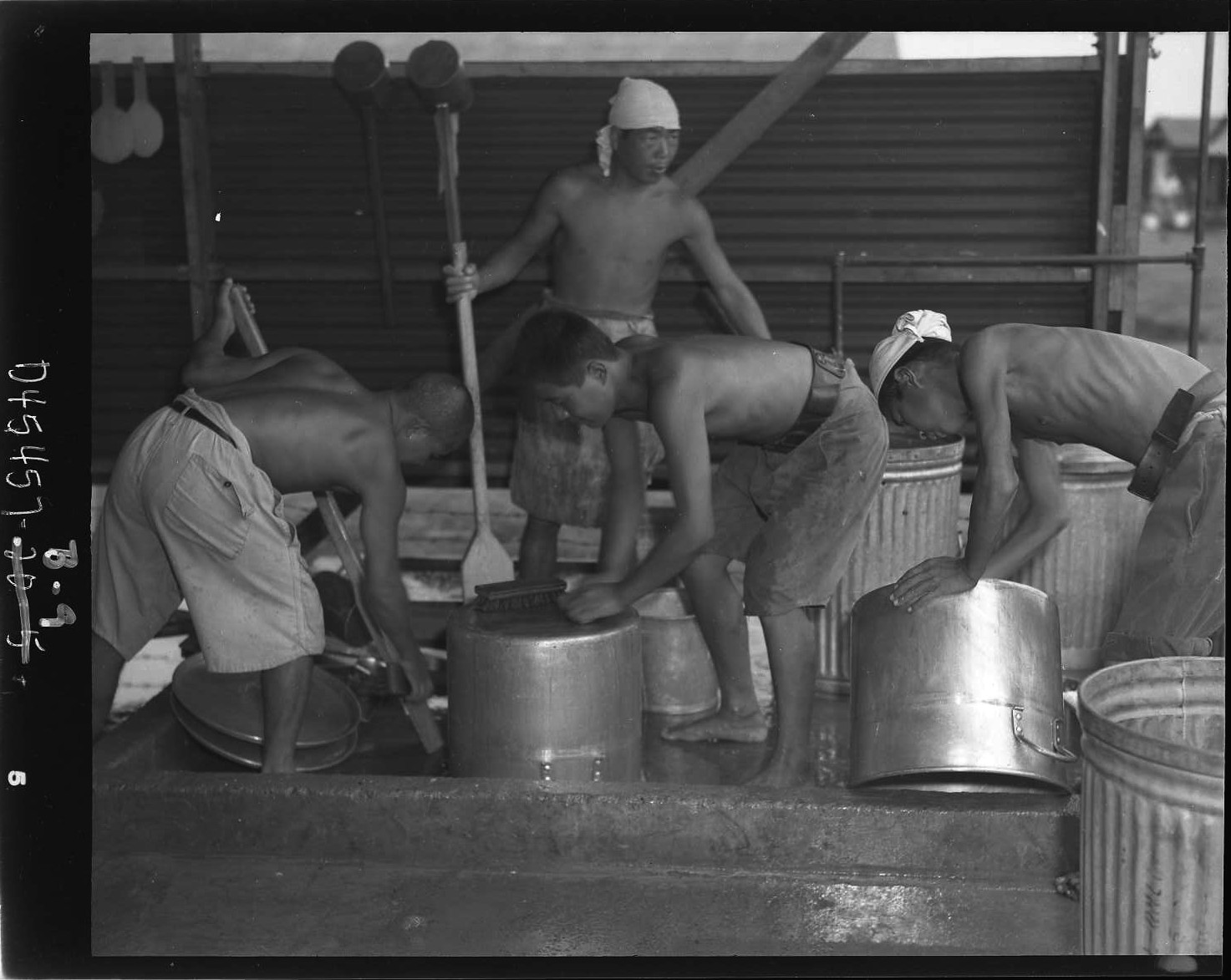
Japanese POWs in New Bilibid Prison were put to task as they await their sentencing.

The 73 trials mainly covered war crimes raging from murder, rape, and torture of civilians, to the inhumane treatment of Prisoners of War in the Philippines. It covered crimes committed across 20 provinces, for crimes committed from December 1941 to September 1945. 6 of the accused were flag officers, and 37% were junior officers, while the rest were enlisted men, and 8 individuals were Japanese civilians who acted as agents of the Japanese occupation. 19 of the accused pleaded guilty. In one instance, Adm. Takeshi Furuse who lead the remnants of the Manila Naval Defense Force during the Battle of Wawa Dam, and charged for the torture, rape, and murder of civilians in Infanta, Tayabas province, pleaded guilty for the crimes committed by his subordinates, and did his best to deflect charges against them. The tribunal took an unusual step of adjusting Furuse's sentence by hanging to musketry, given his cooperative attitude during the trial and willingness to accept command responsibility.

Panels faced by the accused consisted of three to five members of the Judge Advocate. There were instances where panel members were asked to resign if and whenever the defense would question if they were at some point arrested, tortured, or under arrest by the accused. One member resigned for moral reasons.

=== Prosecution and defense strategies ===
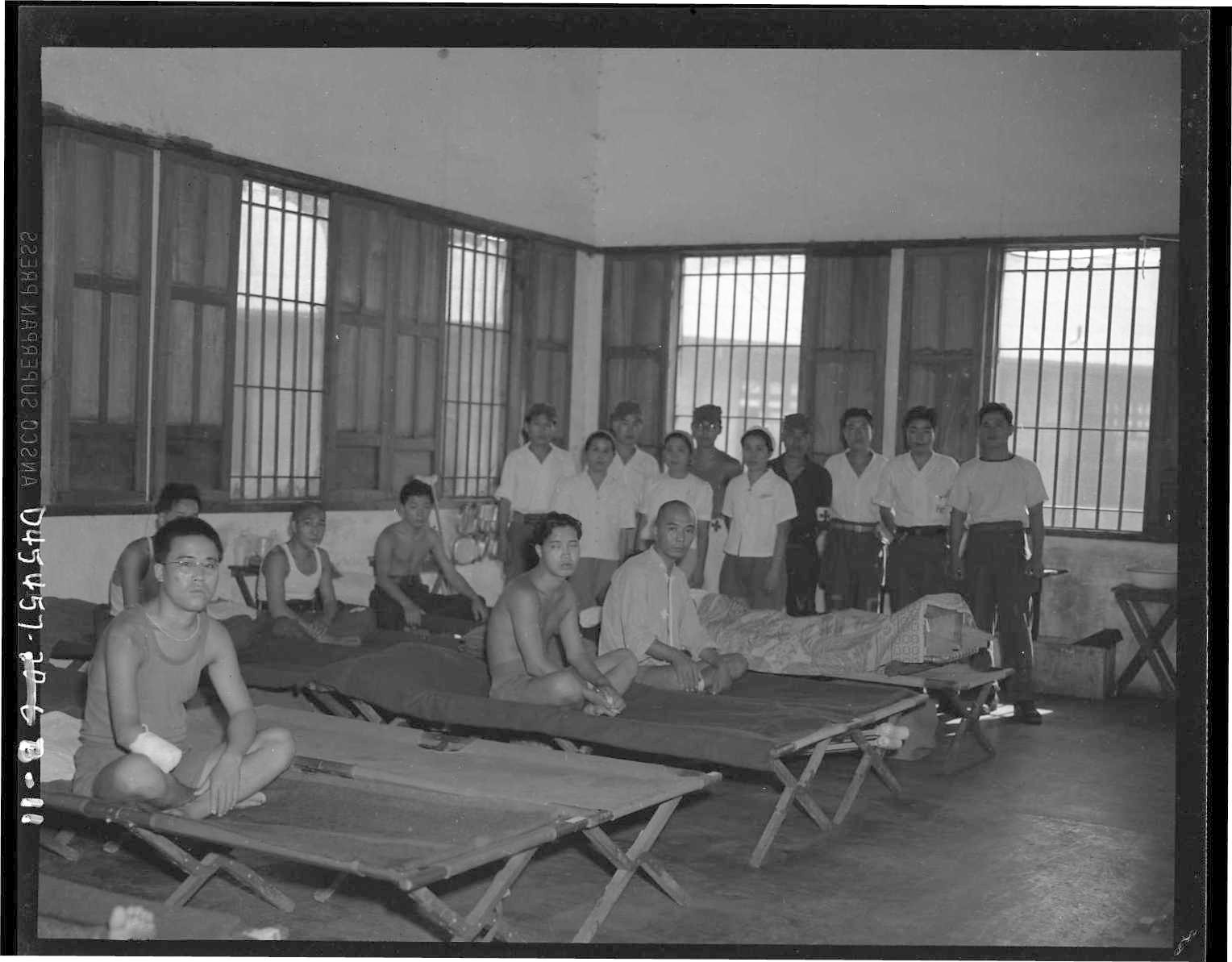
Japanese POWs in their barracks in the New Bilibid Prison.

Prosecution mainly built their cases based on eyewitnesses and positive identification of the accused. The Defense parried this by challenging the witnesses' recall of events, presenting counter witnesses, and alibi. In one instance, Capt. Isao Ichimura of the IJA, who was assigned in Bauan, Batangas, and was accused of permitting his subordinate Lt. Saburo Owari and his men to murder 400 of the town's residences during January 1945. Ichimura claimed he was sick and was not present during the massacre of Bauan. Owari in turn claimed he stayed in the Bauan Municipal Hall, corroborated Ichimura's alibi, while arguing with his co-accused Lt. Takemoto's responsibility over the incident. Both officers nevertheless were sentenced to death by hanging by the military tribunal.

On rare occasions, Filipino civilians would stand as a defense witness, and would support the claim of the good character of the accused. Such was the case of Maj. Hideichi Matsuzaki, who was assigned in San Fernando, Pampanga, as a Kempetai officer. Matsuzaki was accused of ordering the torture and murder of Filipino civilians, including 60 Filipino and American POWs, one of whom was no other than Fred Ruiz Castro, who was the Judge Advocate General of the Philippine Army. To counter the prosecution witnesses, the defense produced Jai Alai Manager, Timoteo Evangelista, and Manila Police chief, Antonio Torres, who both testified that Matsuzaki was sympathetic to Filipinos and was instrumental in expediting the release of suspected Filipino guerrillas. To cap his defense, no other than the Vice President, Elpidio Quirino, submitted a testimony that it was Maj. Matsuzaki who listened to the Quirino family's pleading and his eventual release. Maj. Matsuzaki was later convicted to 20 years of hard labor, but would later be pardoned by Quirino when he became president. There were also whole instances were the accused received petitions from whole towns. Such was the case of Hisamitsu Shimizu, who received support from the townsfolk of Bago, Negros Occidental, as well as Senator Ramon Torres.

Finally, the military tribunal referring to Executive Order No. 68, rejected any alibi claimed by the defendant that they were merely following their superior's orders. Such was the case of Motoaki Deguchi, who was directed by Gen. Yamashita to execute without trial members of the Presidential Guards who were suspected of supporting guerrilla activities against the Japanese.

=== Result ===
Of the 155 defendants, 149 received verdicts. 79 of the accused received death sentences, 31 life sentences, 28 received different degrees of prison term, while 11 were found not guilty. The reaction from the convicts came from both ends of the spectrum – for some the trials were fair, while others felt they were merely pawns in a political revenge. In a few occasions the Japanese Foreign Ministry raised their concerns on a particular trial, or pleaded in behalf of the convict's family.

The Philippine authorities provided mechanism to review the cases, and in some instances received presidential pardons. Cases were initially reviewed by the Judge Advocate General, which now included petitions from concerned parties. This was then submitted to the Chief of Staff of the Armed Forces of the Philippines. After this, the case was submitted to Malacanang through the Department of Justice. If the sentence has been confirmed by the President, the convicted war criminal was set for death by hanging.

The first execution happened on August 13, 1948, with the hanging of Chushiro Kudo in the gallows of New Bilibid Prison, after President Quirino confirmed his sentence. By the end of the year two more war criminals, Shizuo Nakano who was called the "Beast of Cavite," and Tokuji Teramoto also known as "Terror of the Mountain Province" were executed. Two years later, 14 Japanese war criminals were executed in one night without prior announcement. This created a furor in Japan the following day. On the other hand, Quirino has pardoned a number of convicted, one of whom was Gen. Shigenori Kuroda, who lead the 14th Army, and who found himself with the sympathies of the Filipino political elites whom he befriended during the occupation.

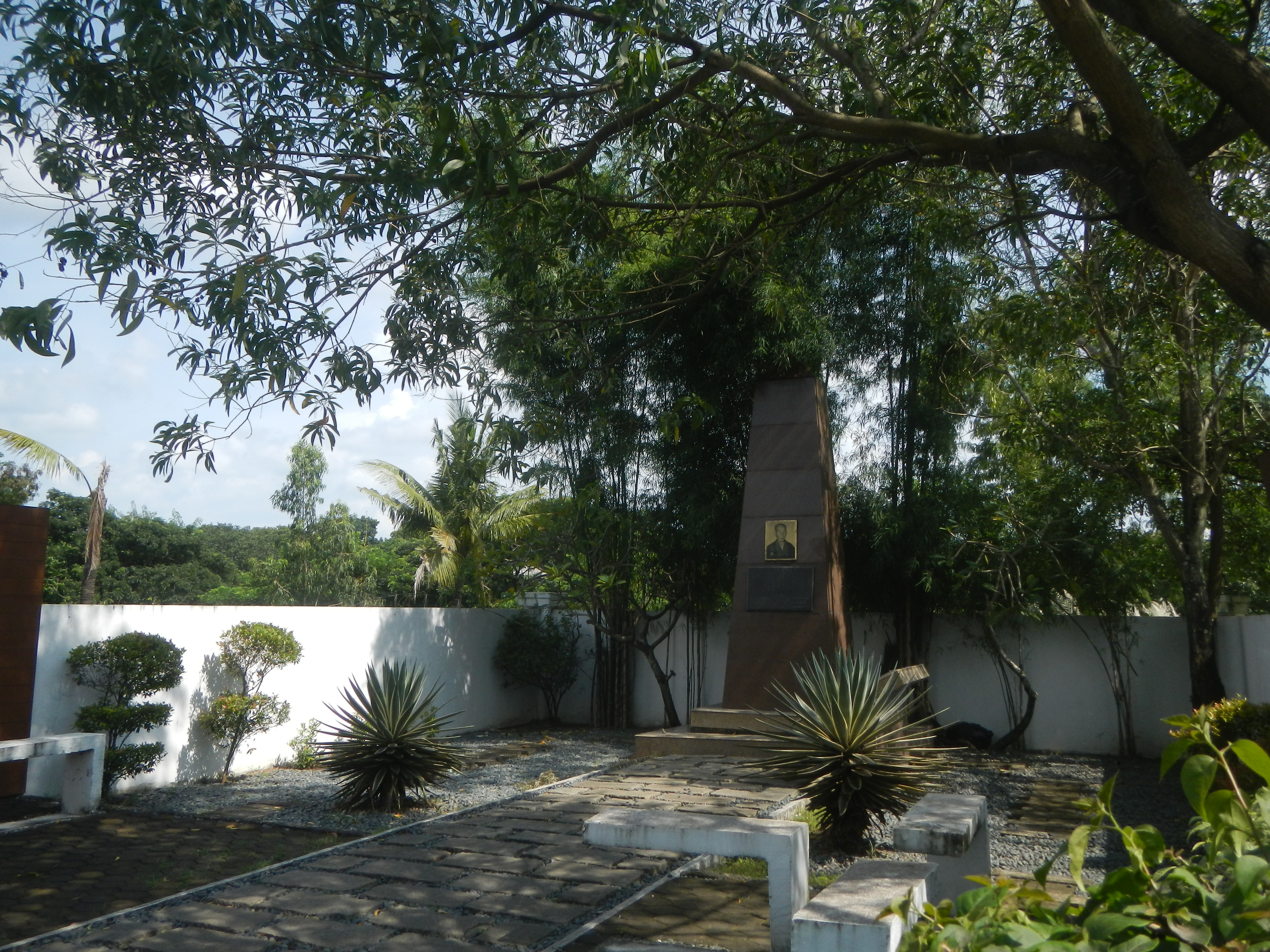
The present day location of the burial ground of the 17 war criminals executed by the Philippine government, has become the Philippine-Japanese Memorial Park.

On July 4, 1953, President Quirino pardoned 323 Filipino collaborators and 105 Japanese POWs who were awaiting their execution or serving their sentences. 31 of the accused Japanese war criminals were set free, 27 were to serve the remainder of their sentences in Sugamo Prison, and 57 were to serve life sentences. Five of these were of flag officer rank, Lt. Gen. Yoshihide Hayashi who headed the Military Administration Department, and was responsible for the execution of Chief Justice Jose Abad Santos, Lt. Gen. Shizuo Yokoyama, who headed the Shimbu Group during the battles east of Manila in the early days of 1945, Maj. Gen. Kiyotake Kawaguchi, Maj. Gen. Kenichi Matsuoka who was once the Provost General and Supreme Commander of the Kempetai in the Philippines, and Rear Adm. Takesue Furuse, who headed the IJN Detachment of the Manila Naval Defense Force, and was responsible for the Infanta Massacre.

The remains of the 17 executed war criminals were exhumed on July 13 from the grounds of the New Bilibid and subsequently cremated. On July 15, the ashes along with the convicted war criminals along with one who was acquitted, two civilians, and two stragglers boarded the Hakusan Maru for their repatriation to Japan.

The present day location of the burial grounds have been turned into the Philippine Japanese Memorial Park, also called as the Japanese Cemetery, inside the New Bilibid Cemetery in Muntinlupa south of the Muntinlupa-Cavite Expressway.

== Defendants & Outcomes ==
Name	Rank	Place & Date of Charge	Date of Verdict	Trial Verdict	Sentence	Outcome	Image
Yoshihide Hayashi	Lt. Gen.	Manila, April 1942	November 14, 1949	Pled Guilty	Life	Pardoned July 4, 1952	
Shigenori Kuroda	Lt. Gen.	Various, May 1943 - Sept 1944	July 14, 1949	Guilty	Life	Pardoned December 1951, repatriated January 1952	
Shizuo Yokoyama	Lt. Gen.	Laguna, Batangas, Rizal, Jan - Apr 1945	May 23, 1949	Guilty	Death by Musketry	Sentence commuted to life 4 July 1953 Pardoned 28 Dec 1953	
Takeshi Furuse	IJN Rear Adm.	Tayabas, Apr - May 1945	March 23, 1949	Pled Guilty	Death by Musketry	Sentence commuted to life 4 July 1953 Pardoned 28 Dec 1953.	
Kiyotake Kawaguchi	Maj. Gen.	Lanao, May 1942	November 14, 1949	Pled Guilty	6 Years	Repatriated April 1953.	
Kensichi Masuoka	Maj. Gen.	Mountain Province, Mar - Apr 1945	December 28, 1949	Guilty	10 Years	Pardoned July 4, 1953.	
Katsuji Shimamura	Col.	Davao City, May 1945	October 9, 1948	Not Guilty			
Yasuo Omura	Lt. Col	Cagayan, Apr 1945	September 12, 1949	Guilty	Life	Pardoned July 4, 1953.	
Somin Ogawa	IJN Lt. Cmdr.	Tayabas, Apr 1945	February 19, 1949	Guilty	Death by Hanging	Sentence commuted to life on July 2, 19532. Pardoned 4 July 1953.	
Shisuhiko Mineo	IJN Lt. Cmdr.	Tayabas, May 1945	February 19, 1949	Guilty	Death by Hanging	Sentence overturned on July 2, 1953.	
Yasumasu Kose	IJN Lt. Cmdr.	Tayabas, May 1945	February 19, 1949	Guilty	Death by Hanging	Sentence commuted to life July 4, 1953. Pardoned December 28, 1953.	

== See also ==
- Philippine resistance against Japan
- Manila massacre
- Palawan massacre
- Pantingan River massacre
