= Mount Mariveles =

Stratovolcano in Bataan, Philippines

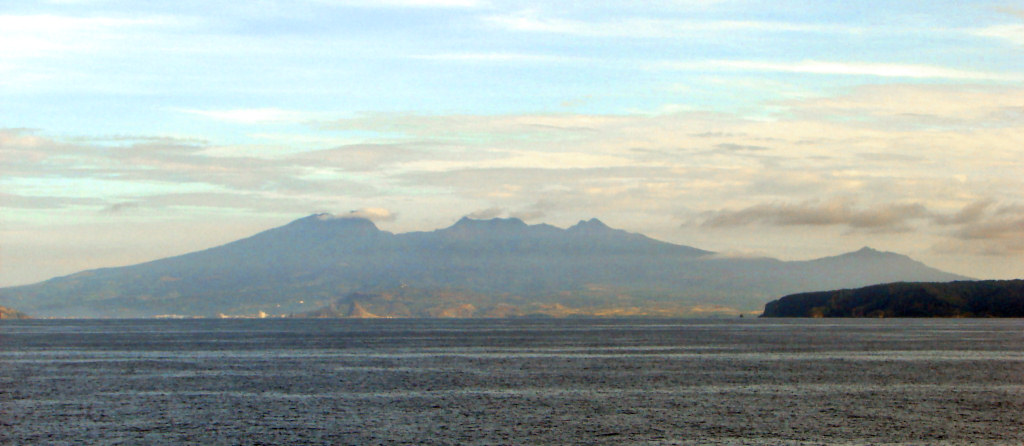
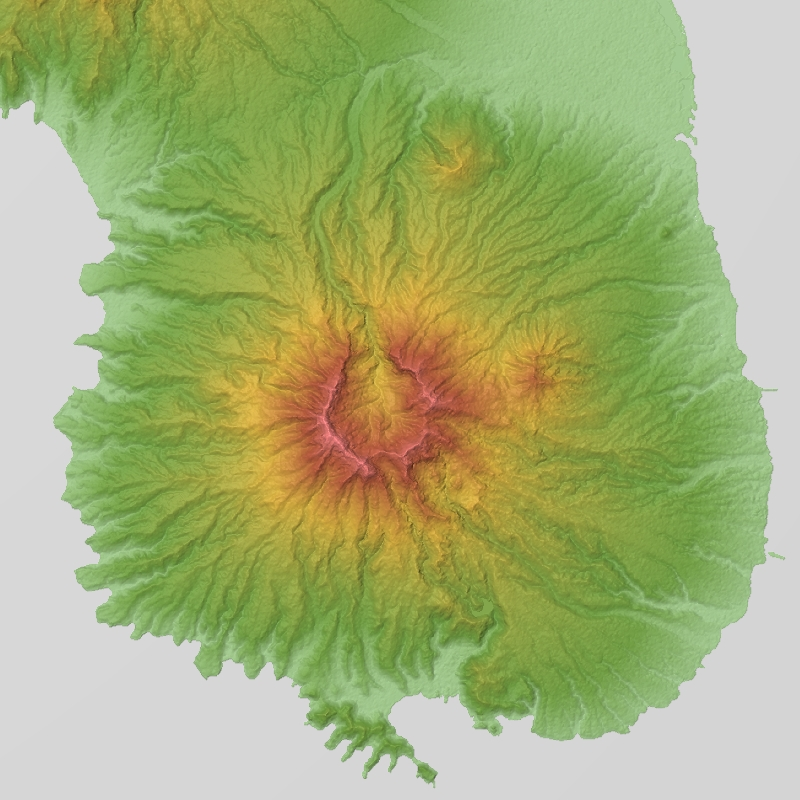
- Mount Mariveles with Mount Limay to its right as seen from the entrance of Manila Bay. Corregidor island is at the foreground right. Relief map

Highest point
- Elevation: 1,398 m (4,587 ft)
- Prominence: 1,256 m (4,121 ft)
- Listing: Potentially active volcano
- Coordinates: 14°31′26″N 120°27′50″E

Geography
- Location within Luzon Location within Philippines
- Country: Philippines
- Region: Central Luzon
- Province: Bataan
- Parent range: Zambales Mountains
- Topo map: PCGS-2511

Geology
- Mountain type: Stratovolcano-Caldera complex
- Volcanic arc: Luzon Volcanic Arc
- Last eruption: 2050 BC

Mount Mariveles is a dormant stratovolcano and the highest point in the province of Bataan in the Philippines. Mariveles and the adjacent Mount Natib comprise 80.9 percent of the total land area of the province. The mountain and adjacent cones lie opposite the city of Manila across Manila Bay, providing a beautiful setting for the sunsets seen from the city.

== Location ==
Mount Mariveles lies at the southern end of the Zambales Mountains in the Bataan Peninsula, west of Manila Bay. Bataan province belongs to the Central Luzon (Region III), of the Philippines.

== Physical features ==
Mount Mariveles is a massive stratovolcano topped with a 4-kilometer (2.5 mi) summit caldera which drains to the north. The highest peak, called Mariveles, has an elevation of 1,388 meters (4,554 ft) asl. Mounts Pantingan, Bataan, Tarak, and Vintana are the other peaks of the volcano-caldera complex, which has a base diameter of 22 kilometers (14 mi).

Mount Samat on the northern slope, and Mount Limay on the eastern slope, are major, youthful-looking parasitic cones of the volcano.

Mariveles is still thermally active with the following hot springs located within the complex: Tiis Spring, Saysain Spring, and Pucot Spring.

== Eruptions ==
There are no recorded historical eruptions from Mariveles caldera. However, geologists report the last active eruption indicated by radiocarbon dating occurring around mid-Holocene or about 2050 BCE.

== Geology ==
Rock type is predominantly biotite, hornblende, and andesite, with dacite flows and dacitic tuffs similar to nearby Mount Natib.

Mount Mariveles is on the Western Bataan Lineament volcanic belt of Luzon, which includes Mount Pinatubo, site of the second largest eruption of the last 20th century.

== Listings ==
The Philippine Institute of Volcanology and Seismology (PHIVOLCS), the Philippine government branch that deals with volcanology in the country, lists Mariveles as a potentially active volcano for the age of its last eruption and active thermal features.

== Climbing Mariveles ==
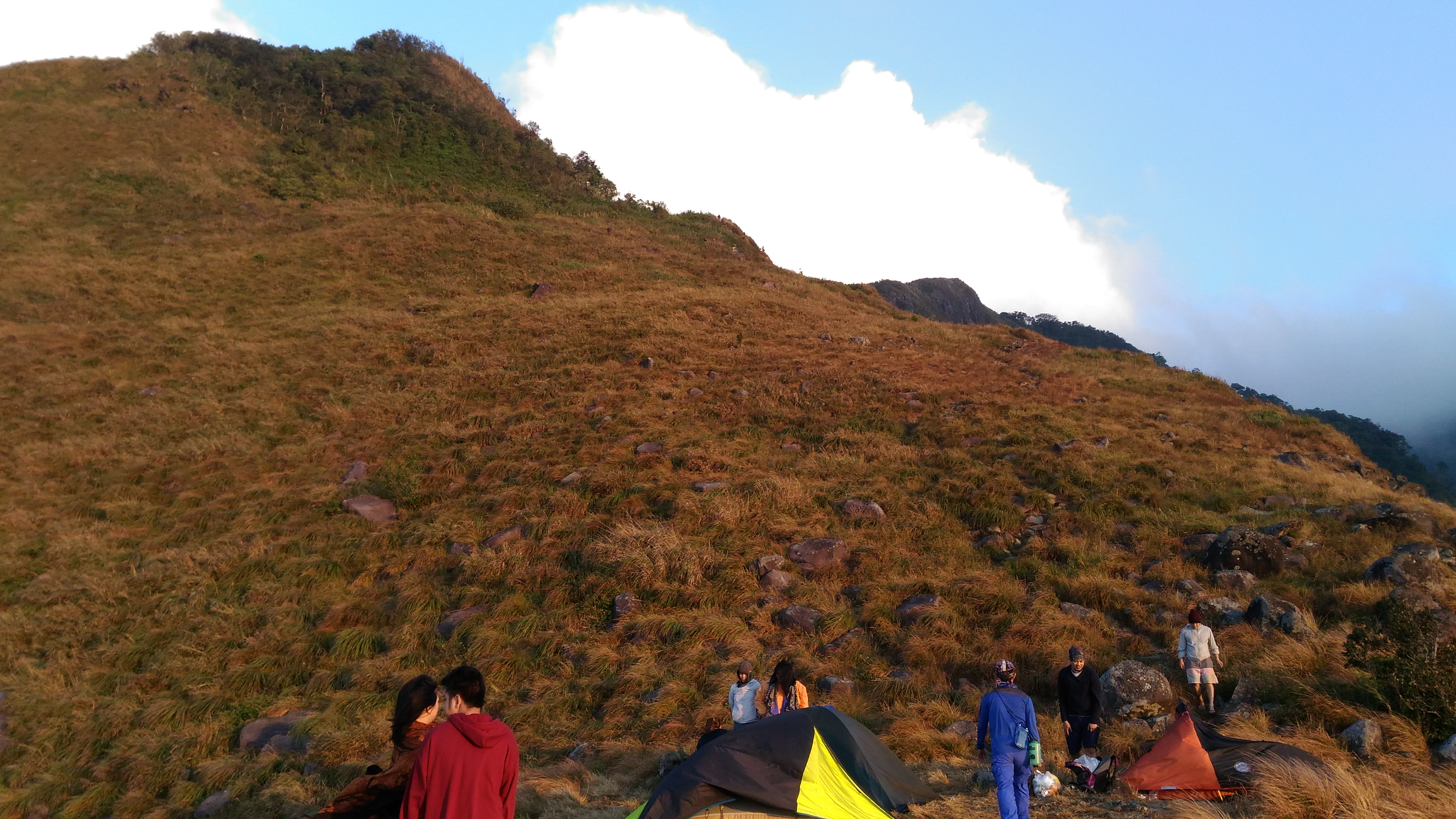
A view of one of Mt. Mariveles' peaks as seen from Tarak ridge campsite

There are already three peaks familiar to the local mountaineering community, namely Tarak Ridge, Pantingan or Banayan Peak, and Mariveles Ridge. The rest of the peaks in the caldera are still waiting to be explored.

Tarak Ridge is the more well-known destination on Mount Mariveles, with its jump-off point situated at Barangay Alas-asin, Mariveles, Bataan. Pantingan Peak (locally called Banayan Peak) can be accessed through Sitio Duhat, Saysain, Bagac, Bataan. Mariveles Ridge can be accessed through Sitio Parca, Mariveles, Bataan.

== See also ==
- List of volcanoes in the Philippines
- List of active volcanoes in the Philippines
- List of potentially active volcanoes in the Philippines
- List of inactive volcanoes in the Philippines
- Pacific ring of fire
