= Limay Power Plant =

Limay Power Plant may also refer to:

- Limay CCGT Power Plant, diesel-fired power station commissioned in 1993.
- Limay Coal Power Plant, owned by San Miguel Energy Corporation commissioned in 2017.
