= MT Princess Empress oil spill =

2023 oil spill in the Philippines

- MT Princess Empress, the oil tanker that caused the oil spill
- Interactive map of MT Princess Empress oil spill
- Location: Tablas Strait, Philippines (Note: The location of the sunken motor tanker is either: at 13.89 km (7.50 nmi) northeast of Balisangan Point, Pola, as recorded by the National Mapping and Resource Information Authority; or; at 14.26 km (7.7 nmi) from Balingawan Point, Naujan, as reported by the Philippine Coast Guard.)
- Coordinates: 13.3175°N 121.529722°E
- Date: February 28, 2023; 3 years ago

Cause
- Cause: Sinking of MT Princess Empress
- Casualties: 203 non-fatal injuries
- Operator: RDC Reield Marine Services

Spill characteristics
- Volume: <1 million L (260,000 US gal) (Note: The exact volume of the oil spill—which includes both the diesel fuel from the oil tanker and the industrial fuel oil it was carrying—has yet to be determined. MT Princess Empress was carrying 900,000 liters (200,000 imp gal; 240,000 U.S. gal) of industrial fuel oil.)
- Area: 162.6 km^{2} (62.8 sq mi)
- Shoreline impacted: 74.7 km (46.4 mi)

On the morning of February 28, 2023, MT Princess Empress sank off Naujan, Oriental Mindoro, Philippines, causing an oil spill in the waters of the provinces of Antique, Batangas, Oriental Mindoro, and Palawan. En route from Bataan to Iloilo, the oil tanker was carrying 900,000 liters of industrial fuel oil before it sank.

== Background ==
MT Princess Empress, the oil tanker that caused the oil spill, is owned by RDC Reield Marine Services. Before it sank, the oil tanker was crewed by 20 people and en route to Iloilo to transport 900,000 liters (240,000 U.S. gal) (Note: Initially reported as 800,000 liters (210,000 U.S. gal).) of industrial fuel oil from SL Gas Harbor Terminal in Limay, Bataan. According to an energy sector source, industrial fuel oil, also known as "black oil", is "highly toxic to the environment".

The Tablas Strait, where the oil spill occurred, is a waterway between the islands of Mindoro, Marinduque, Panay, and Tablas that serves as a major shipping route in the Philippines. The strait and its adjacent waterbodies, including the Verde Island Passage, are one of the most biodiverse in the country. At least 21 marine protected areas could be affected by the oil spill according to the Department of Environment and Natural Resources (DENR). Moreover, residents of the coastal settlements of Oriental Mindoro and nearby provinces rely on fishing and other marine activities for their livelihood. Particularly the fisherfolks, which are communities vulnerable to natural and human-made hazards, had their subsistence, food security, and human well-being highly compromised.

== Sinking and oil spill ==
At approximately 2 a.m. Philippine Standard Time (UTC+8) on February 28, 2023, while traversing the waters of Naujan, Oriental Mindoro, MT Princess Empress experienced rough sea conditions. At 4:16 am, it was reported to be half-submerged. Four minutes later, Panamanian-flagged MV Efes rescued the oil tanker's crew and took them to Subic, Zambales, where they arrived at around 6 p.m. unscathed. From its initial position, Princess Empress drifted towards the vicinity of Balingawan Point before sinking completely by 8 am. Later that day, BRP Melchora Aquino and an Airbus helicopter were dispatched to the area by the Philippine Coast Guard (PCG) to investigate. A five-kilometer-long and 500-meter-wide oil spill was then discovered near the shipwreck, although the coast guard clarified that it was from the diesel fuel used to power the tanker, not the industrial fuel oil it was carrying.

On March 1, the oil spill expanded to around six by four kilometers. The coast guard described its slick as "black and thick, with strong odor". The oil had thinner particles as compared with the diesel fuel from the tanker, which caused an initial oil spill. At around 2 pm, MTUG Titan – a tugboat carrying oil spill recovery equipment and members of the Marine Environmental Protection Unit (MEPU) of the PCG, the Environmental Management Bureau (EMB) of the DENR, and Malayan Towage and Salvage Corporation (MTSC) – reached the oil spill area and began spraying oil dispersants.

== Impact ==
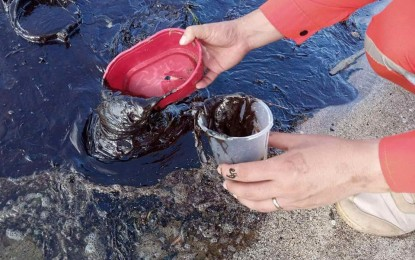
Oil spill collection in Caluya, Antique

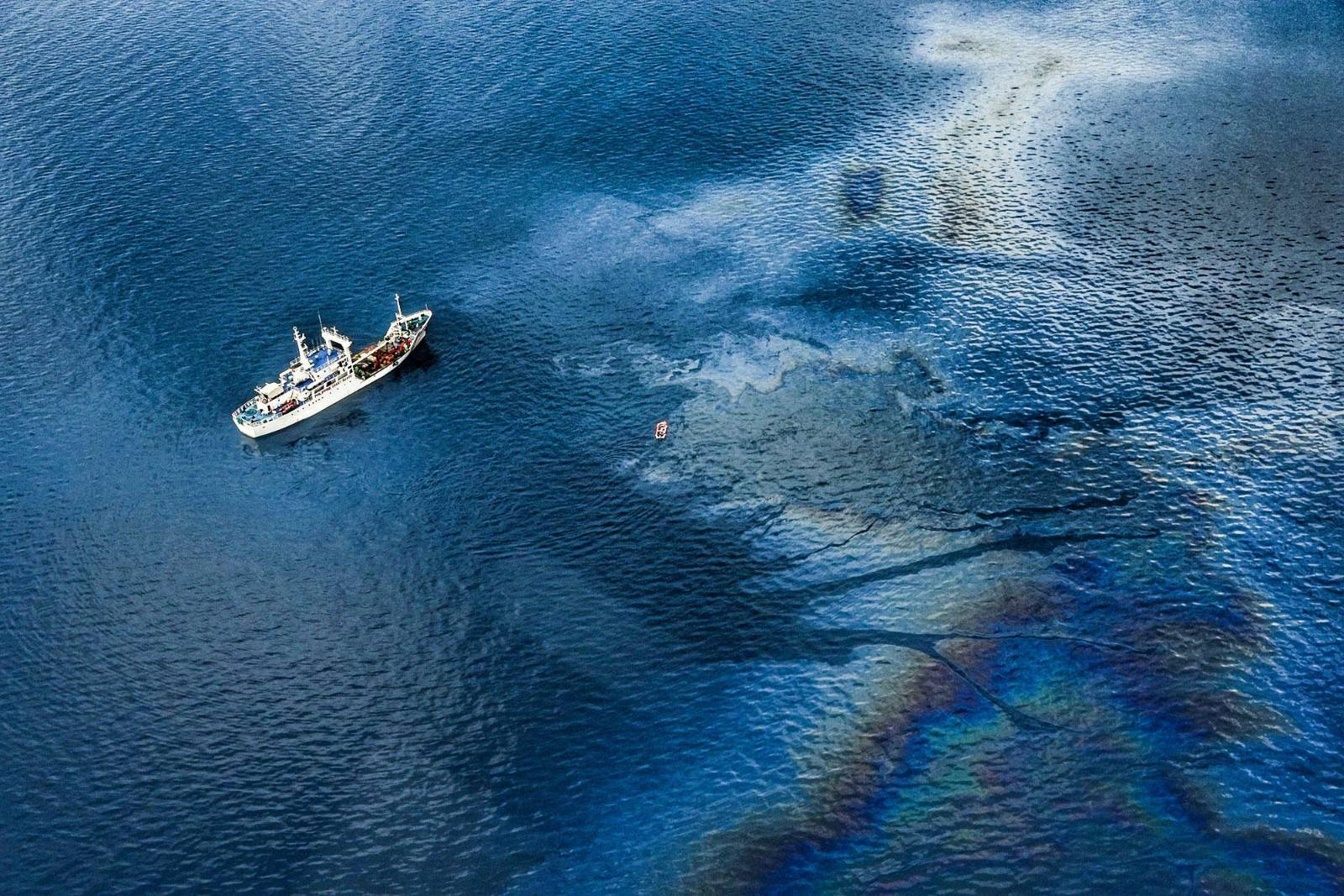
Oil spill off the waters of Oriental Mindoro.

The oil spill affected the following:

- ten municipalities (Bansud, Bongabong, Bulalacao, Gloria, Mansalay, Naujan, Pinamalayan, Pola, Puerto Galera, Roxas) and a city (Calapan) in Oriental Mindoro;
- one in Antique: Caluya;
- two in Palawan: Taytay and Agutaya;
- two in Occidental Mindoro: Magsaysay and San Jose;
- at least two municipalities (Tingloy and San Juan) and a city (Batangas City) in Batangas;
- part of Quezon.

It reportedly reached Verde Island Passage as well as the northern part of Tablas Strait and the northern part of Tayabas Bay.

It affected major ecosystems across the provinces of Oriental Mindoro, Palawan, and Antique. The Department of Environment and Natural Resources (DENR), by March 29, reported that up to 5,185 hectares of marine habitat in Oriental Mindoro (including 2,252 hectares of corals) and Western Visayas have been affected. The Department of Tourism reported that as of March 15, sixty-one sites in Oriental Mindoro, including beach resorts, have been affected. Seven marine protected areas were reportedly damaged.

By late May, reported environmental damage, particularly to coral reefs and mangroves, was estimated at over ₱9.52 billion; and by February 2024, estimated damages to agriculture in three regions were reported at ₱4.93 billion according to the National Disaster Risk Reduction and Management Council (NDRRMC). Most of the affected areas are in the Mimaropa region, with Pola suffered the worst; damages were also reported in Batangas City in Calabarzon, and Caluya in Western Visayas. The Bureau of Fisheries and Aquatic Resources earlier said that the fishing sector loses nearly ₱19 million daily.

Environmental group Oceana Philippines warned corals, seagrasses and mangroves will take years for recovery.

Damage and losses to agriculture
Provinces	Number of fisherfolks affected	Production loss (MT)	Cost of damage and losses (₱)
Batangas (Batangas City)	337	—	2,646,798.00
Oriental Mindoro (Calapan and eight municipalities)	20,550	—	4,723,181,755.74
Palawan (two municipalities)	3,716	—	188,378,904.00
Antique (five barangays in Caluya)	3,247	928.64	15,035,124.00
Total	27,850	928.64	4,929,242,581.74
According to DA and NDRRMC; as of February 6, 2024.

The NDRRMC reported that as of February 6, 2024, a total of 43,699 families or 200,244 individuals have been affected in 264 villages in the provinces of Batangas, Oriental Mindoro and Palawan, and in the municipality of Caluya, Antique. As reported also by NDRRMC, until late June 2023, a total of 27,850 fishers from these areas have been affected, although the agricultural office of Oriental Mindoro reported a month earlier a higher record of 31,524.

In Oriental Mindoro alone, more than 99,000 people have been affected.

In Pola, until June 2023, 211 affected people fell ill, with some experiencing dizziness, eye irritation, and fever, among other symptoms. Also, the incident affected at least 5,520 fishermen.

On March 6, 2023, declarations of state of calamity were made separately by the provincial government of Oriental Mindoro and the municipal government of Caluya. Such declaration in Pola was lifted two days prior to the incident's anniversary in 2024.

Pre-school level in barangay San Jose, Naujan, was the only class to be suspended, on March 27, 2023, caused by a strong odor from the shoreline.

=== 2024 CEED report ===
A report by a non-governmental sustainability think tank, Center for Energy, Ecology and Development, was released on February 26, 2024. The report estimated the oil spill left damages of at least ₱41.2 billion: environmental damage, around ₱40.1 billion; socio-economic losses, ₱1.1 billion. The estimates are 800% higher than that previously by the government.

The study, which focused on the damage 39 weeks after the incident, reported that even after the lifting of the fishing ban, fishers still suffered income losses from July to November, and their yields decreased to only around a third of their normal catch being obtained.

A separate report revealed as well that high concentration of oil and grease remained, far above normal, in affected marine protected areas, particularly in Oriental Mindoro, nearly a year after the incident.

== Response ==
=== National ===
RDC Reield Marine Services, the owner of MT Princess Empress, hired two contractors—Harbor Star Shipping Services and Malayan Towage and Salvage Corporation (MTSC)—to help with their cleanup efforts.

The Philippine Coast Guard (PCG), through the National Mapping and Resource Information Authority located the sunken tanker with actual depth at 389.1 meters.

To protect marine protected areas in the Mimaropa and Western Visayas, the DENR, PCG and the locals installed organic spill booms.

On March 23, three days after oil sightings in Verde Island, Batangas City were confirmed, the PCG elevated the response operations to Tier III, considered national-level and may call for assistance from the international community.

The PCG reported on June 17 that about 95% of the affected coastline had been cleaned. By June 26, BFAR has allowed fishing activities in Oriental Mindoro except in Pola.

MTSC chartered a foreign vessel (see § International) which reportedly accomplished siphoning operations within 19 days, with only few oil traces left in sunken tanker's fuel pipes. Containment operations are ongoing for oil that may leak from these pipes.

The Department of Justice said it will petition for a Writ of Kalikasan if cleanup efforts are not completed within the period set by the government.

The Philippine government has provided assistance. As of late February 2024, the Department of Social Welfare and Development provided more than ₱982.7 million in humanitarian assistance to nearly 42,500 affected individuals in four provinces; meanwhile, the NDRRMC reported that assistance worth ₱847.1 million was given.

=== International ===
On March 12, a team of experts from Japan arrived in Pola to assist in the containment and clean up of the oil spill, as well as site visit and assessment of affected villages. Equipment from the Japan Disaster Response Team were also sent. The team conducted an inspection of the vicinity waters off Naujan. On March 20, Japanese dynamic positioning vessel (DPV) Shin Nichi Maru, on board its underwater robot ROV Hakuyo, arrived in Naujan. The said ROV found the tanker the following day. PCG and the DPV implemented "bagging" operations, with its ROV installing specialized bags from the United Kingdom to temporarily prevent the leaks from the tanker.

Anchor handling vessel DPV Pacific Valkyrie, carrying ROV MR2 Hydros, was sent by the Government of Singapore. The DPV is contracted by the United States Navy Supervisor of Salvage and Diving to help in oil spill management operations; its ROV helped the Japanese ROV through conducting surveys and mapping. The United States also sent absorbent harbor boom to be used to control the spread of oil. Underwater operations were finished after almost a month, with one of 24 original sources of leakage from the motor tanker left unsealed.

Other countries including South Korea and France also extended aid to contain the oil spill.

Liberian-registered DSV Fire Opal, as well as a group of foreign specialized technicians, arrived in the country in late May to conduct siphoning operations. The said vessel, chartered by the MTSC, reportedly completed the operations by June 16, with all cargo oil tanks in the sunken vessel empty, and only few oil traces left in pipes which cannot be recovered.

As decided by the International Oil Pollution Compensation Fund, only 627 fishermen in Pola received compensation to be sourced from the IOPC funds; the two-day distribution was held in February 2024.

== Investigation ==
Later investigation revealed conflicting reports on whether the motor tanker had permits to operate, and that the tanker is a 50-year-old rebuilt scrap rather than a purpose-built. Investigation by the Senate revealed that the ship sailed without permission nine times. On the other hand, the National Bureau of Investigation (NBI) found as well that the tanker was registered despite RDC Reield Marine Services had submitted falsified documents to the Maritime Industry Authority (MARINA); and was reportedly renovated in Navotas and not newly built in Bataan as declared by both parties, noting alleged conflicting information on the vessel's origins; these allegations were later denied by the RDC.

At least three cease-and-desist orders had been issued by MARINA against the RDC, which involves cancellation of the franchise, suspension of operations, and prevention of vessels to sail. These company's vessels include two tankers and a passenger ship. MARINA later found probable cause to file charges against the RDC. In May, MARINA–NCR revoked the company's license; the said decision is not yet final.

Some legislators raised the possibility of the government's sanctions against RDC and the vessel's charterer SL Harbor Bulk Terminal Corporation; the latter is exempted from any liability under the law.

In June 2023, NBI, as well as Pola mayor Jennifer Cruz, filed before the Department of Justice (DOJ) multiple recommended charges against certain individuals. In February 2024, DOJ recommended the filing of criminal charges against the ship's owners and corporate officers, as well as a MARINA personnel and a private individual, all in relation to falsification of documents, though their names were not disclosed yet. The complaints against 19 Philippine Coast Guard (PCG) personnel and another MARINA personnel were dismissed due to lack of probable cause. Charges of perjury against two RDC officials were not included in the recommendation.

On the other hand, in August 2023, the second batch of the charges was filed by the NBI–Environmental Crimes Division before the Office of the Ombudsman; mainly with violation of Republic Act 3019 (Anti-Graft and Corrupt Practices Act). Same respondents were charged:

- Nine RDC officials and six crew members of the oil tanker;
- Nineteen PCG members for grave misconduct and neglect in the performance of duty, for its alleged failure to inspect the tanker before its departure;
- MARINA director and MARINA Shipyard chief, both in Region V, for grave misconduct and neglect in the performance of duty.

Another batch is expected to be filed against the RDC for allegedly violating environmental laws.

== See also ==
- Guimaras oil spill
- Manila Bay oil spill
