= Bataan Refinery =

Largest oil refinery in the Philippines

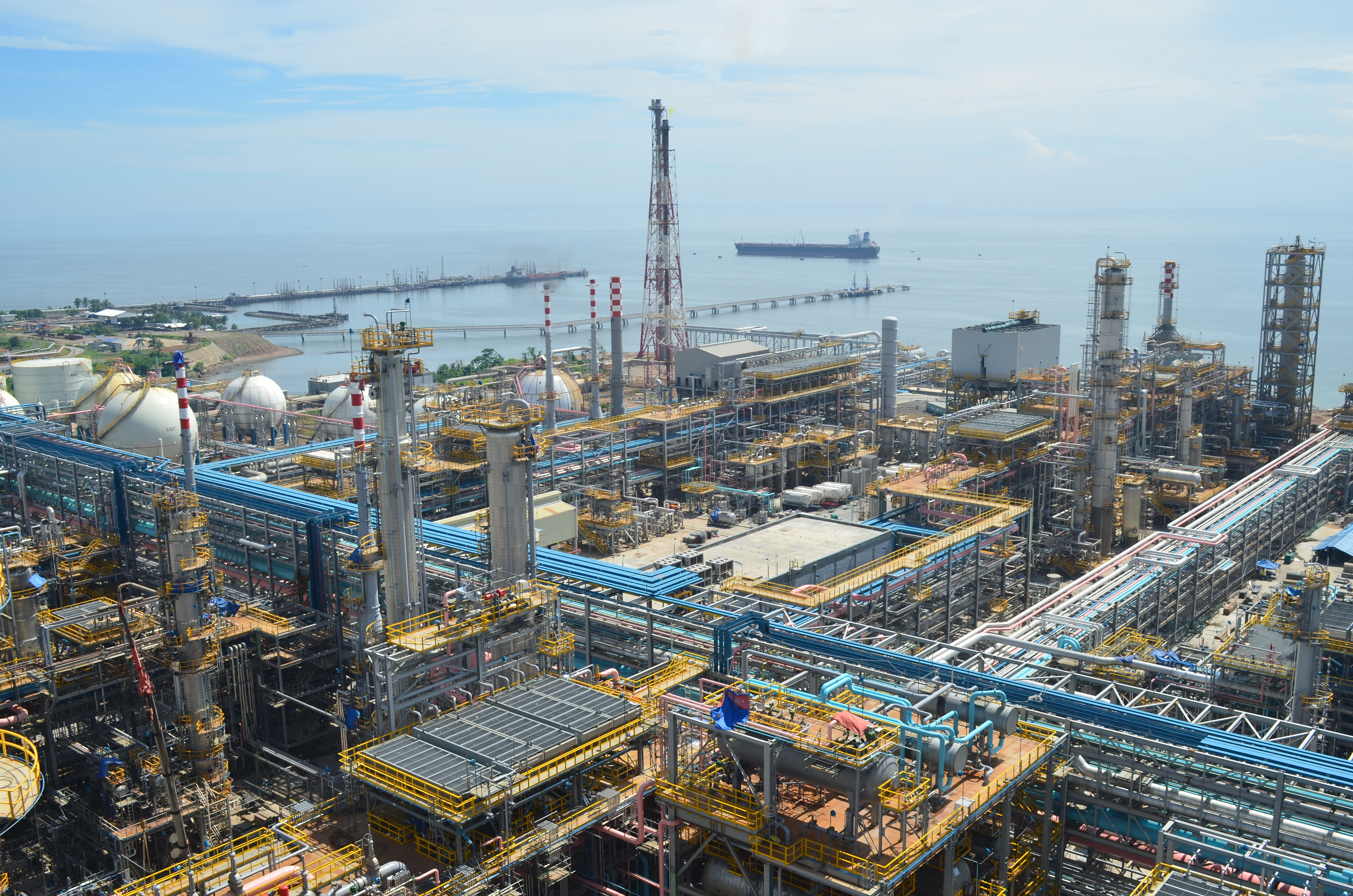

- Location within Luzon Location within Philippines
- Location: Limay, Bataan, Philippines; 14°31′48″N 120°36′00″E

Refinery details
- Operator: Petron Corporation
- Owner: Petron Corporation
- Opened: 1961
- Capacity: 180,000 barrels per day (29,000 m^{3}/d)
- No. of employees: 1,196 (2014)

The Bataan Refinery is an oil refinery in Limay, Bataan, Philippines. It is owned and operated by Petron Corporation and is the only operating oil refinery in the Philippines with the capacity to process 180,000 barrels per day (29,000 m^{3}/d). It began operation in 1961.

== History ==
The Bataan Refinery was originally owned by Stanvac. Construction of the refinery began in 1957 and was inaugurated on April 8, 1961 by then Philippine President Carlos P. Garcia. It was later acquired by Esso Philippines, Inc. which later became Petron Corporation.

The site is powered by a 140-MV solid fuel-fired power plant of Petron which was briefly owned by SMC Powergen from 2013 to 2016.. SMC Powergen expanded the power plant's capacity from 70-MV in 2014.

Fuel marking at the refinery was adopted in January 2020 to support the government's effort against fuel smuggling.

Due to low demand of oil caused by the COVID-19 pandemic the oil refinery temporarily ceased operations in May 2020 The refinery resumed operations in September 2020. The refinery temporary ceased operations again from February to May 2021 and resumed commercial operations in June 2021. Petron announced that it would be building a new 184MW power plant to replace the older facilities of the refinery.
