= Petron =

Oil company in the Philippines

Petron Corporation
- Logo since 1998
- Formerly: Standard Vacuum Oil Company (Philippines) (1933–1962); Esso Philippines, Inc. (1962–1973); Petrophil Corporation (1973–1988)
- Type: Public Subsidiary
- Traded as: PSE: PCOR
- Industry: Oil and Gas
- Founded: September 7, 1933; 93 years ago (as Standard Vacuum Oil Company (Philippines))
- Headquarters: Petron Megaplaza, Makati, Philippines (1998–2010); SMC Head Office Complex, 40 San Miguel Avenue, 1550 Mandaluyong, Philippines (2010–present)
- Area served: Philippines; Malaysia
- Key people: Ramon S. Ang (Chairman); John Paul L. Ang (President and CEO); Lubin B. Nepomuceno (General Manager); Emmanuel E. Eraña (SVP & CFO)
- Products: Oil; Natural gas Oil refining
- Revenue: ▲810 billion PHP (2025)
- Operating income: ▲37.3 billion PHP (2025)
- Net income: ▲15.6 billion PHP (2025)
- Total assets: ▲449.14 billion PHP (2025)
- Total equity: ▲113.42 billion PHP (2025)
- Number of employees: 60,000 (2025)
- Parent: San Miguel Corporation (68.26%)
- Website: www.petron.com

Petron Corporation is one of the largest oil companies in the Philippines, supplying more than a third of the country's oil requirements. It operates a refinery in Limay, Bataan with a rated capacity of 180,000 barrels per day (29,000 m^{3}/d). From the refinery, Petron moves its products mainly by sea to 32 depots and terminals throughout the country. It is the sole oil refiner in the country after Pilipinas Shell exited the refining business.

== History ==
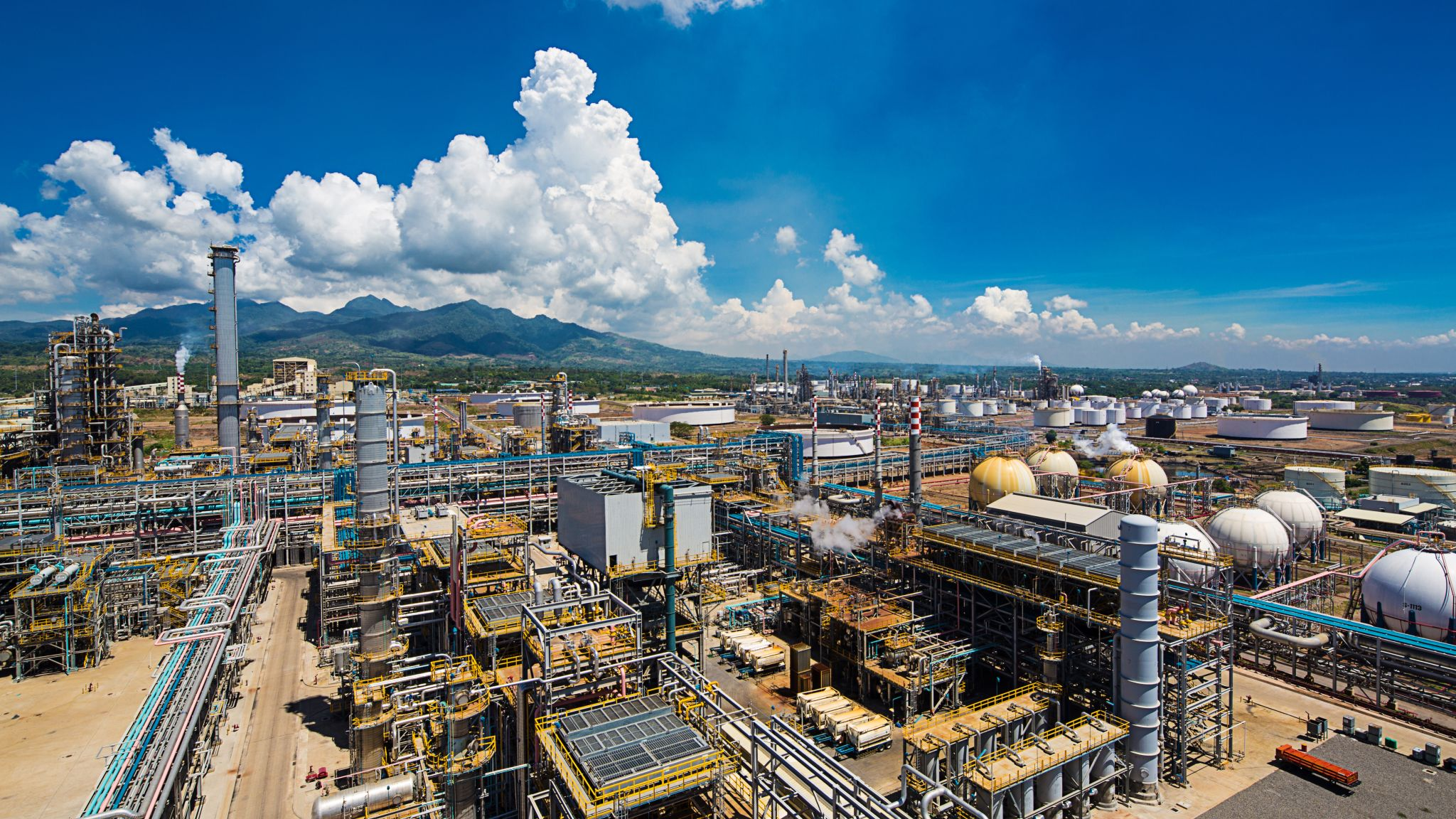
Petron Bataan Refinery in Limay, Bataan, is the sole operating integrated oil refinery and petrochemical plant in the Philippines.

Petron Megaplaza in Makati, Philippines, was Petron's headquarters from 1998 to 2010.

Petron's history dates back to September 7, 1933, when Socony-Vacuum Oil Company (Standard Oil of New York) and Standard Oil of New Jersey (also known as Jersey Standard) merged their interests in the Far East into a 50–50 joint venture named the Standard Vacuum Oil Company (Stanvac). It operated in 50 countries, including the Philippines, New Zealand, China, and the region of East Africa.

In 1953, the Philippine national government, partly to promote Claro M. Recto's national industrialization program and partly to respond to increasing international oil prices, attempted to launch a national oil company that caters Filipino consumers with affordable petroleum products. In 1957, Stanvac won the concession to build and operate a refinery in Bataan. For this purpose, FilOil Refinery Corporation was established in 1959.

In 1962, due to an antitrust suit, Stanvac was dissolved and the marketing and refining interests were divided between the former partners. Eastern Standard Esso took over Stanvac's Philippine operations, including FilOil Refinery Corporation. Esso was a trade name used by Standard Oil of New Jersey.

In December 1973, the Philippine government, through the newly-established Philippine National Oil Company (PNOC), acquired Esso Philippines, Inc., including FilOil Refinery Corporation. Esso Philippines, Inc. was renamed Petrophil Corporation (Petrophil) and by 1974, Esso filling stations were rebranded as "Petron", a portmanteau of petroleum (PET) and research octane number (RON). Subsequently, Mobil (successor of Socony-Vacuum Oil Company) also sold its share in FilOil Refinery Corporation to PNOC. The oil refining and marketing units in PNOC, including FilOil Refinery Corporation, were merged into Petrophil Corporation. In 1988, Petrophil Corporation was renamed Petron Corporation.

As part of the government's privatization program under President Fidel V. Ramos, PNOC sought a strategic partner that would give Petron a reliable supply of oil, plus access to state-of-the-art refining technology. The result was a partnership with the world's largest oil producer, Saudi Aramco. On February 3, 1994, PNOC and Aramco Overseas Co. B.V. signed a share purchase agreement that gave both an equal 40% stake in Petron Corporation. The remaining 20% of Petron shares were sold to the public.

On August 11, 2006, a Petron oil tanker Solar 1, carrying fuel oil sank, causing the Guimaras oil spill, the biggest oil spill in Philippine history.

In 2008, Saudi Aramco sold its entire stake to the Ashmore Group, a London-listed investment group. Ashmore acquired an additional 11% when it made a required tender offer to other shareholders. By July 2008, Ashmore, through its SEA Refinery Holdings B.V., had a 50.57 percent of Petron's stock. Ashmore's payment was made in December 2008. In December 2008, Ashmore acquired PNOC's 40% stake. In the same month, San Miguel Corporation (SMC) said it was in the final stages of negotiations with the Ashmore Group to buy up to 50.1 percent of Petron. In 2010, SMC acquired majority control of Petron Corporation.

In January 2013, Petron officially opened their Malaysian operations, rebranding all Esso and Mobil stations across Peninsular Malaysia.

On November 9, 2021, SMC CEO Ramon Ang offered to sell Petron back to the government in response to calls for re-nationalization due to rising fuel costs. Over four years later as part of the fallout of the 2026 Iran war, he reiterated such offer.

== Products and services ==
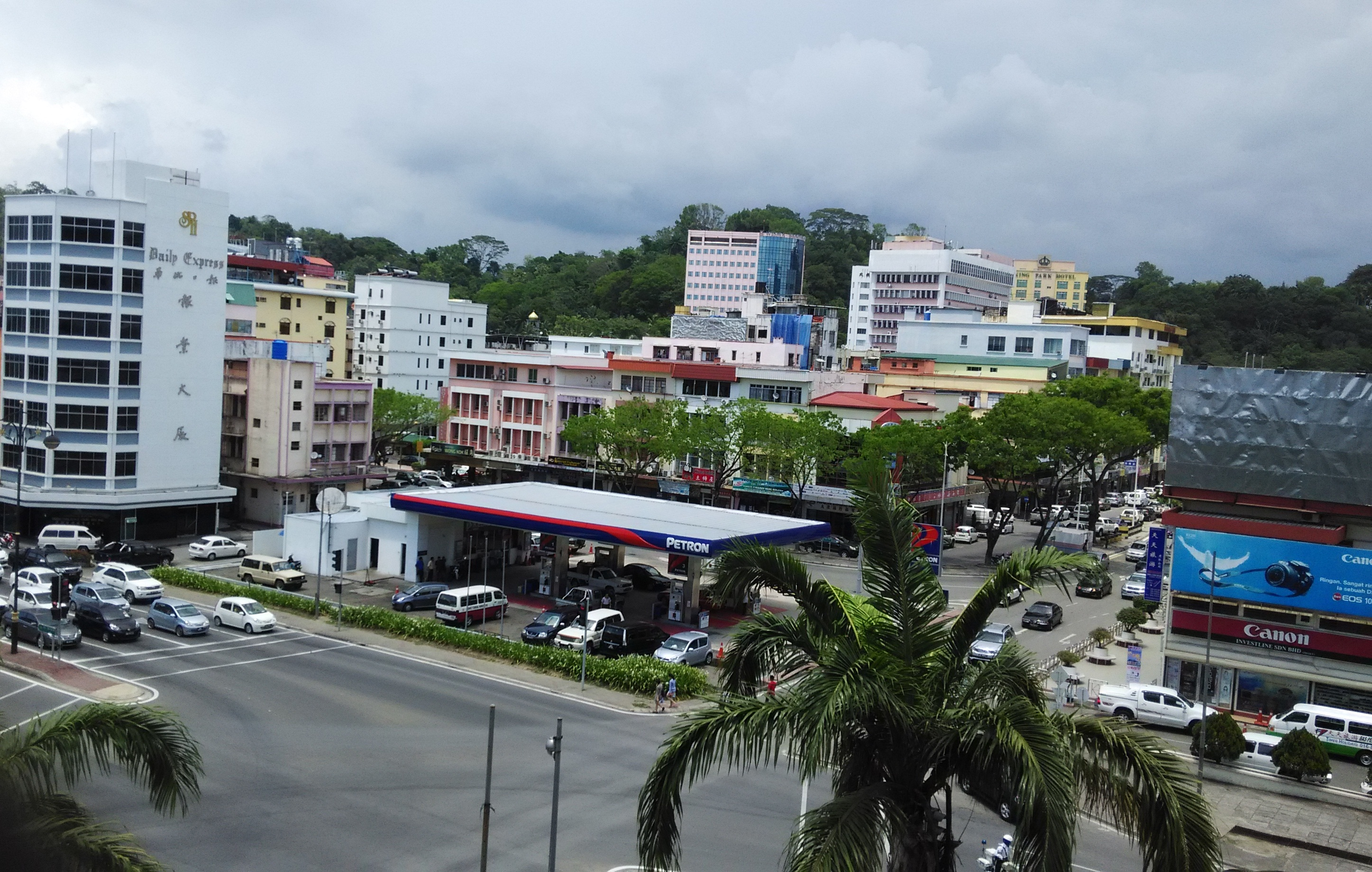
Petron oil station located beside the Daily Express building in Kota Kinabalu, Sabah, Malaysia

The company's ISO-14001-certified refinery processes crude oil into a full range of petroleum products, including LPG, gasoline, diesel, jet fuel, kerosene, industrial fuel oil, solvents, asphalts and mixed xylene. Petron's lube oil blending plant produces mechanical lubricants and grease. These products are also sold through service stations and sales centers, and directly to industrial customers with the largest client being the power sector. Petron also supplies jet fuels to international and domestic carriers.

Through more than 1,200 service stations, they retail gasoline and diesel to motorists and public transport operators. They also sell their LPG brand Gasul to households and other consumers through an extensive dealership network.

Petron opened its first fuel additives blending plant in the Asia-Pacific region at the Subic Bay Freeport Zone in November 2008. The plant has the capacity to blend 12,000 metric tons (MT) of fuel additives per year. In 2006, the facility was constructed in partnership with Innospec. As part of the agreement.

In April 2008, Petron commissioned the country's first petrochemical feedstock units, at its 180,000-barrel (29,000 m^{3})-per-day Bataan Refinery.

The feedstock unit converts black products (fuel oil) into LPG, gasoline, and diesel. It also purifies propylene to manufacture food packaging, appliances, suitcases, furniture, DVDs and car parts.

== Sports teams ==
- Petron Blaze Spikers
- Petron Blaze Boosters

== See also ==
- Petron Megaplaza
- List of gas station chains in the Philippines
