= Pola, Oriental Mindoro =

Municipality in Oriental Mindoro, Philippines

Pola
- Municipality
- Municipality of Pola
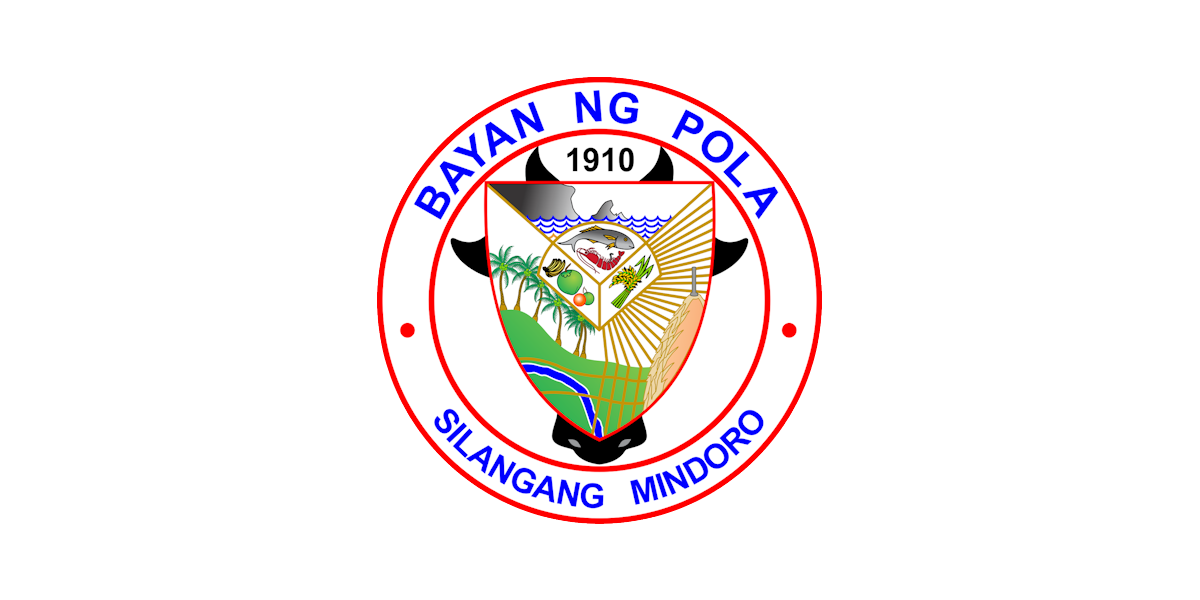
- Flag Seal

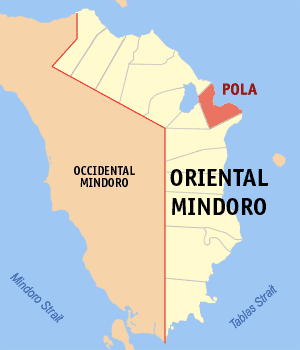
- Map of Oriental Mindoro with Pola highlighted
- Interactive map of Pola
- Location within the Philippines
- Coordinates: 13°08′38″N 121°26′24″E
- Country: Philippines
- Region: Mimaropa
- Province: Oriental Mindoro
- District: 1st district
- Founded: January 1, 1912
- Barangays: 23 (see Barangays)

Government
  - Type: Sangguniang Bayan
  - Mayor: Jennifer M. Cruz (NUP)
  - Vice Mayor: Marvin T. Rivera (PDP-Laban)
  - Representative: Arnan C. Panaligan (Mindoro Bago Sarili)
  - Electorate: 23,444 voters (2025)

Area
  - Total: 159.34 km^{2} (61.52 sq mi)
- Elevation: 70 m (230 ft)
- Highest elevation: 487 m (1,598 ft)
- Lowest elevation: 0 m (0 ft)

Population (2024 census)
  - Total: 35,771
  - Density: 224.49/km^{2} (581.44/sq mi)
  - Households: 8,965

Economy
  - Income class: 2nd municipal income class
  - Poverty incidence: 22.27% (2023)
  - Revenue: ₱ 169 million (2024)
  - Assets: ₱ 899.8 million (2024)
  - Expenditure: ₱ 177.4 million (2024)
  - Liabilities: ₱ 1,520 million (2024)

Service provider
  - Electricity: Oriental Mindoro Electric Cooperative (ORMECO)
- Time zone: UTC+8 (PST)
- ZIP code: 5206
- PSGC: 1705210000
- IDD : area code: +63 (0)43
- Native languages: Tadyawan; Tagalog

Pola, officially the Municipality of Pola (Tagalog: Bayan ng Pola), is a municipality in the province of Oriental Mindoro, Philippines. According to the 2024 census, it has a population of 35,771 people. It is 74 kilometres (46 mi) from Calapan.

It is known as the heritage town of Oriental Mindoro for its vast ancestral homes and heritage houses which were built during the Spanish era.

== Etymology ==
Its name was derived from the color of the soil in the locality, which is reddish clay. In Tagalog, this is called "pula". This name persisted until the Spaniards arrived and embraced it as the name of the town. The Poblacion is located at the estuary of the Casiligan River, surrounded by abundant green mountain ranges and rocky hills to the west, Hence, the people are given a conducive refuge for agriculture, fishing, and nipa weaving.

== History ==
=== Oil spill ===
The town recently gained national attention because of an oil spill that occurred on February 28, 2023, after the MT Princess Empress sank off the coast of neighboring town Naujan; Pola is one of the worst affected municipalities by the oil spill.

== Geography ==
=== Barangays ===
Pola is politically subdivided into 23 barangays. Each barangay consists of puroks and some have sitios.

- Bacauan
- Bacungan
- Batuhan
- Bayanan
- Biga
- Buhay na Tubig
- Calubasanhon
- Calima
- Casiligan
- Malibago
- Maluanluan
- Matulatula
- Pahilahan
- Panikihan
- Zone I (Poblacion)
- Zone II (Poblacion)
- Pula
- Puting Cacao
- Tagbakin
- Tagumpay
- Tiguihan
- Campamento
- Misong

=== Climate ===
Climate data for Pola, Oriental Mindoro
Month	Jan	Feb	Mar	Apr	May	Jun	Jul	Aug	Sep	Oct	Nov	Dec	Year
Mean daily maximum °C (°F)	26 (79)	28 (82)	29 (84)	31 (88)	31 (88)	30 (86)	29 (84)	29 (84)	29 (84)	29 (84)	28 (82)	27 (81)	29 (84)
Mean daily minimum °C (°F)	22 (72)	22 (72)	22 (72)	23 (73)	25 (77)	25 (77)	25 (77)	25 (77)	25 (77)	24 (75)	23 (73)	23 (73)	24 (75)
Average precipitation mm (inches)	115 (4.5)	66 (2.6)	55 (2.2)	39 (1.5)	164 (6.5)	282 (11.1)	326 (12.8)	317 (12.5)	318 (12.5)	192 (7.6)	119 (4.7)	173 (6.8)	2,166 (85.3)
Average rainy days	13.6	9.4	10.4	10.5	21.1	26.0	29.0	27.6	27.5	23.1	16.7	16.1	231
Source: Meteoblue

== Demographics ==
Population census of Pola
Year	Pop.	±% p.a.
1903	1,650	—
1918	4,307	+6.61%
1939	10,107	+4.15%
1948	12,612	+2.49%
1960	21,884	+4.70%
1970	18,789	−1.51%
1975	19,072	+0.30%
1980	23,188	+3.98%
1990	26,833	+1.47%
1995	29,156	+1.57%
2000	31,938	+1.97%
2007	32,635	+0.30%
2010	32,984	+0.39%
2015	34,701	+0.97%
2020	35,455	+0.45%
2024	35,771	+0.21%
Source: Philippine Statistics Authority

== Economy ==
Poverty incidence of Pola (%)

Source: Philippine Statistics Authority

== Education ==
The Pola Schools District Office governs all educational institutions within the municipality. It oversees the management and operations of all private and public, from primary to secondary schools.

=== Primary and elementary schools ===
- Bacawan Elementary School
- Bacungan Elementary School
- Bakyaan Elementary School
- Bayanan Primary School
- Biga Elementary School
- Buhay Na Tubig Elementary School
- Calatagan Elementary School
- Calima Elementary School
- Calubasanhon Elementary School
- Casiligan Elementary School
- Malibago Elementary School
- Maluanluan Elementary School
- Matulatula Elementary School
- Misong Elementary School
- Pahilahan Elementary School
- Panikihan Elementary School
- Pola Central School
- Pula Elementary School
- Puting Cacao Elementary School
- Tagbakin Elementary School
- Tagumpay Elementary School
- Tiguihan Elementary School

=== Secondary schools ===
- Araceli B. Pantilanan - Bacawan High School
- Domingo Yu Chu National High School
- Guillermo Raymundo - Calima High School
- Leandro Panganiban Sr. - Tagumpay High School
- Matulatula High School
- Pola Catholic School

== Notable people ==
- Noli De Castro – journalist, news anchor, 12th Vice-President of the Philippines (2004-2010)
- Ejay Falcon – Pinoy Big Brother: Teen Edition Plus big winner, actor, and former Oriental Mindoro vice-governor
