= 2024 Manila Bay oil spill =

Industrial oil tanker spill in the Philippines

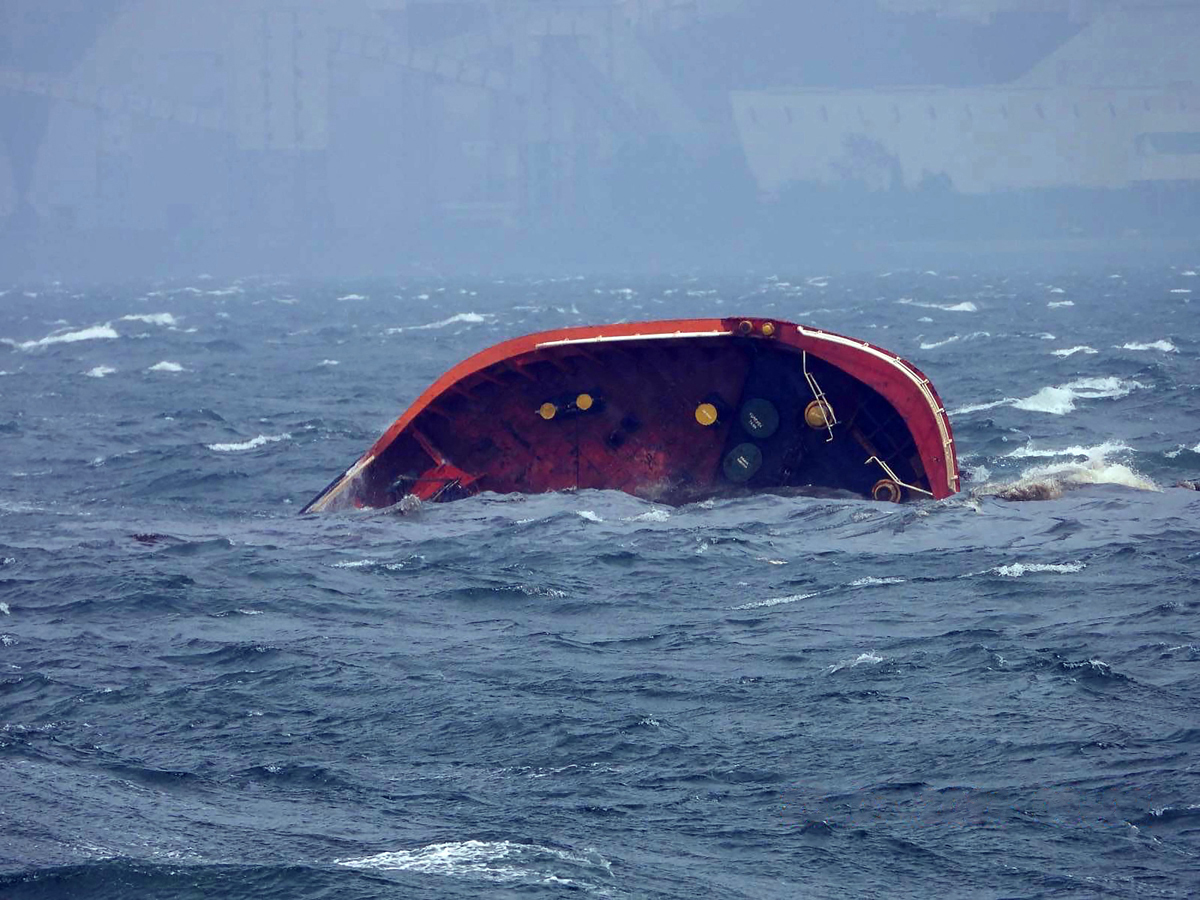
- Shipwreck of MT Terranova
- Interactive map of 2024 Manila Bay oil spill
- Location: Manila Bay, 7 km off the coast of Limay, Bataan, Philippines
- Coordinates: 14.5645662°N 120.7026136°E
- Date: July 25, 2024; 23 months ago

Cause
- Cause: Sinking of MT Terranova
- Casualties: 1 death

Spill characteristics
- Volume: Up to 1,454 metric tons (1,431 long tons; 1,603 short tons)
- Area: 93.74 square kilometers (36.19 sq mi)

On July 25, 2024, the Philippine-flagged industrial fuel tanker MT Terranova (Note: Also spelled Terra Nova) (IMO number: 9092666) capsized and sank in Manila Bay, off the east coast of Lamao Point, Limay, Bataan, causing an ongoing oil spill. The tanker was carrying nearly 1.5 million liters (400 thousand U.S. gallons) of industrial oil. Initially, its engine oil leaked into the sea; after a while, the cargo began spilling into the bay following the sinking. Over the succeeding days, oil spills were also reported from two other vessels that sunk nearby.

== Background ==
The Philippines was struck by heavy rainfall and strong winds caused by the southwest monsoon enhanced by Typhoon Gaemi (locally called Carina) in late July 2024.

== Sinkings ==
=== Terranova ===
At 1:10 am (UTC+8) on July 25, 2024, the Terranova capsized and sank in 34-meter-deep (112 ft) waters 3.6 nautical miles (6.7 km) off the coast of Limay in the province of Bataan. Sixteen of the crew members were rescued by the Philippine Coast Guard (PCG) vessel BRP Melchora Aquino while one died. His body was recovered in waters off the shore of Limay.

The oil tanker was destined for Iloilo in the central Philippines, with seventeen crew members on board the ship. Information from the LSEG Eikon indicated that the ship could carry 1,415 tons of deadweight tonnage.

=== Jason Bradley ===
On July 27, the motor tanker MTKR Jason Bradley, carrying 5,500 liters of diesel fuel (although it was initially believed that this had already been emptied) sank in 9-meter-deep (30 ft) waters 600 yards off the coast of Barangay Cabcaben in the neighboring municipality of Mariveles. Its six crewmen were rescued by another vessel. The PCG was able to seal leaks coming from the vessel and initiated removal of the diesel cargo with the help of a salvor, with operations expected to last for two weeks.

=== Mirola 1 ===
On July 31, MV Mirola 1, carrying two drums of heavy fuel oil and 3,000 liters of diesel, was found abandoned, ran aground, and tilted to one side in the Five Fingers area of Sitio Quiapo, Barangay Biaan in Mariveles adjacent to the South China Sea, with diesel fuel leaking into the water from tanks inside the ship. The vessel was believed to have run aground on July 23 after sailing from Navotas without authorization from the PCG.

== Impact ==
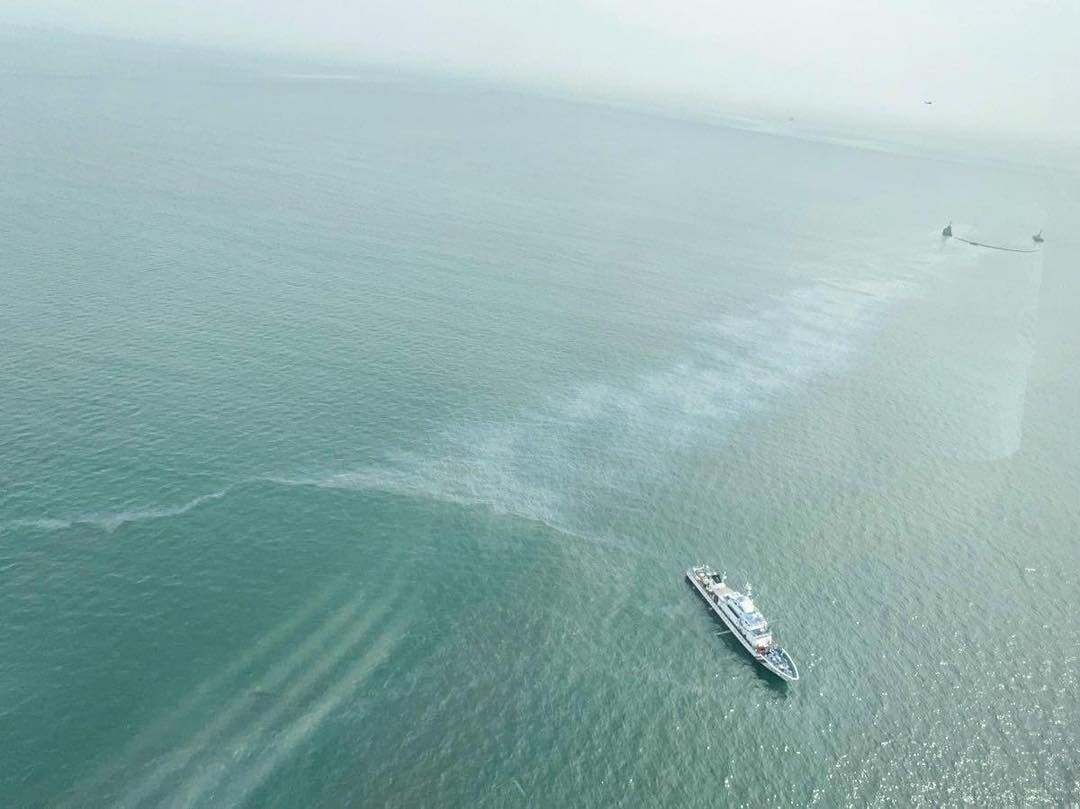
Aerial view showing the extent of the oil spill

Reports from the PCG on July 25, 2024, reported that the size of the "enormous" oil spill had spread out over "several" kilometers and was at risk of making landfall on the coast of Manila. PCG spokesperson Armando Balilo stated that the oil spill had a significant risk of impacting the livelihoods of local fishermen by damaging the marine environment of Manila Bay. He noted that the oil spill could grow into the largest in Philippine history if the entire 1.494 million liters of oil were to disperse into the bay. The Philippine Space Agency (PhilSA), citing satellite images, estimated that the spill could reach an area of around 14.4 square kilometers. On July 26, the PCG assessed that the oil slick had reached two kilometers in length. The mayor of Limay said that 400 to 500 liters of oil from the ship's fuel tank had leaked out. By July 30, the PSA estimated that the oil spill covered an area of around 93.74 square kilometers in Manila Bay.

Transportation secretary Jaime Bautista reported that the tanker was carrying roughly 1,494 metric tons of industrial fuel at the time of its sinking. The oil spill spread quickly due to strong waves extending the area of the spill rapidly.

On July 27, the PCG reported that the ship's industrial fuel cargo began to leak, contributing to the oil spill caused by diesel fuel spilling from the vessel's fuel tank. As a result, the amount of oil spilled tripled from the initial leak on July 25, with the surface oil slick extending between 12 and 14 kilometers (7.5 and 8.7 miles). In response, the PCG issued a ban on fishing in Manila Bay. Traces of the spill were discovered in Bulacan, particularly in Hagonoy, and Cavite, particularly in Cavite City, Maragondon, Naic, Tanza and Ternate.

On July 30, Bataan Governor Joet Garcia imposed a no-fishing zone on Limay, later adding that about 14,000 people working in the province's fishing industry would be affected by the oil spill. On that date, satellite imaging from the PSA determined that the visible surface area of the oil spill had grown to about 93.74 km^{2} (36.19 square miles), covering about 4.7% of Manila Bay's 1,994 km^{2} (769.9 sq mi) surface area. On July 31, a state of calamity was declared in the municipalities of Kawit, Noveleta, Rosario, Tanza, Naic, Maragondon, and Ternate and the city of Bacoor in Cavite by Governor Jonvic Remulla. A ban on catching shellfish was also declared in Cavite, while the Bureau of Fisheries and Aquatic Resources (BFAR) said that fish samples taken from parts of the province before the appearance of oil slicks had already tested positive for petrochemicals. The BFAR lifted its warnings against consuming seafood from affected areas, except for those caught in Cavite, on August 13.

A state of calamity was also declared in Bataan on August 6. Authorities estimated that around 350,000 people, including around 25,000 working in the fishing industry, were affected by the oil spill in Cavite, while daily economic losses in the province was estimated at nearly P18 million. The Department of Agriculture estimated that total damages to fishing had reached P78.69 million, directly affecting 28,373 people.

On August 1, the oil spill reached the coast of Manila, where it was visible from Roxas Boulevard.

== Response ==
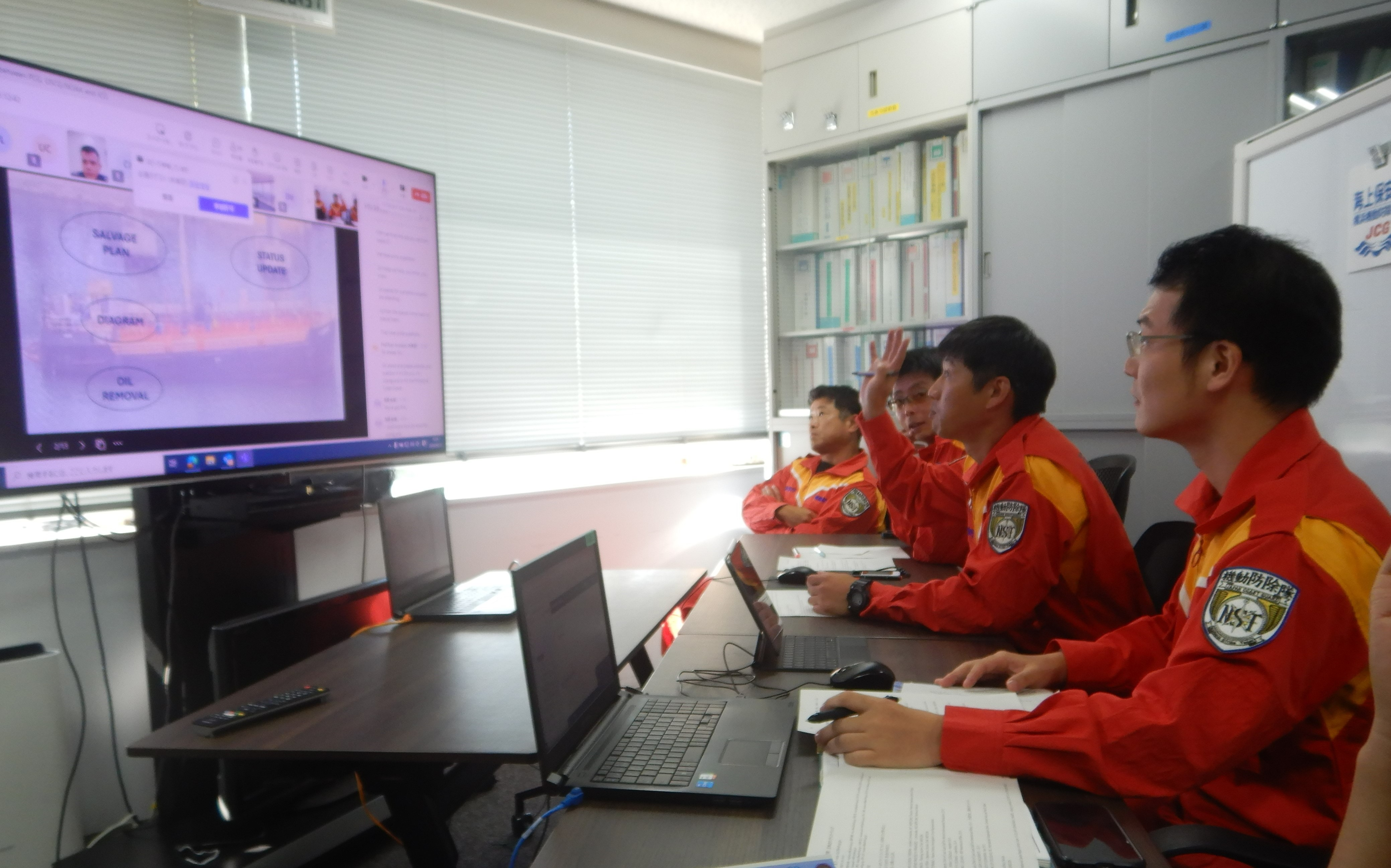
Staff of the Japan Coast Guard holds an online meeting with the Philippine Coast Guard, the United States Coast Guard and the US National Oceanic and Atmospheric Administration on August 7 regarding the oil spill.

The PCG dispatched a 97-meter long coast guard ship to prevent further spillage, while several smaller ships were put on standby until weather conditions stabilized enough. President Bongbong Marcos also conducted an aerial survey of Pampanga, Bulacan, and Bataan to assess the effects of the oil spill. Environment secretary Toni Yulo-Loyzaga deployed the survey vessel BRP Hydrographer Presbitero to conduct ecosystems mapping of areas affected by the oil spill.

The PCG started using floating barriers and siphoning using water buckets to clean up the oil slick. Booms, including those made from coconut husks, and dispersants were also used after divers found the cargo was leaking from the valves. The PCG estimated that siphoning of the cargo would take a week. The PCG ordered the sealing of nine leaking valves before the start of the siphoning on July 30. By July 29, 14 of its 24 tank valves from its eight compartments had been sealed. The PCG further reported that Harbor Star Shipping Services, Inc. had been selected to salvage the vessel and that its divers had managed to seal the valves. The PCG added that the siphoned IFOs will be transferred to Terranova' sister ship the MT Helena Marie.

The Department of the Interior and Local Government (DILG) also appealed for hay, hair and coconut coir pith donations to process into oil booms as absorbent. It also reported not only air and water contamination, but damage to coral reefs and mangrove areas. The Department of Environment and Natural Resources (DENR) estimated that around 4,700 hectares of critical ecosystems and 44 sites linked to the Asian Waterbird Census could be affected within a 30-kilometer radius of where the Terranova sank.

On August 1, the PCG began removing oil from the MV Mirola 1 and formally seized the vessel on August 16. On August 1, the PCG also announced the postponement of oil siphoning from the Terranova for about two weeks, citing the need to replace the initial capping bags on the valves of the vessel with metal ones to prevent more discharges during the actual removal. The recovery of the oil finally began on August 13.

On August 5, the PCG said that the oil sheen from the Terranova had been contained, while 790 liters of oil-water mixture and five sacks of contaminated oil debris had been recovered from the Mirola 1. On August 10, the PCG began removing oil from the MTKR Jason Bradley, which was partially refloated on August 12. The Mirola 1 was completely refloated on August 22 and was towed to a shipyard in Mariveles for repairs the next day. Salvage operations at the Terranova were suspended in early September due to the effects of Tropical Storm Enteng (Yagi) and resumed on September 7, with its conclusion expected on September 10.

On August 28, President Marcos announced that fishing in Cavite could resume.

On September 12, the contracted salvor, Harbor Star, reported they recovered 1,415,954 liters of oil and an additional 17,725 kilograms of solid oily waste as part of the variance volume representing a recovery rate of 97.43%. The remaining 37,867 liters, accounting for 2.57% of the total oil cargo, were lost due to various factors such as biodegradation, dissipation, absorption by sorbent booms, and unpumpable sludge left in the tanks.

On September 26, the Jason Bradley was refloated, and towed to a dockyard in Orion, Bataan.

== Investigation ==
The Department of Justice (DOJ) and the DILG said that the three sunken vessels may have been involved in oil smuggling, which the Terranova's owner, Portavaga Ship Management Inc., denied. The DOJ subsequently said that both the Jason Bradley and Mirola 1 had not been cleared by the PCG to sail, adding that the latter vessel was unregistered. Records from the Bureau of Customs also showed that the Jason Bradley was the subject of a seizure and detention warrant in 2022 for failing fuel marking tests and inability to provide evidence of payment of duties and taxes. An investigation into the disaster was begun by the Senate on August 14.

== See also ==
- MT Princess Empress oil spill
- Guimaras oil spill
