= Limay Coal Power Plant =

Power station in Limay, Bataan, Philippines

- Country: Philippines
- Location: Limay, Bataan
- Coordinates: 14°31′11.5″N 120°36′12.5″E
- Status: Operational
- Commission date: 2017
- Owner: SMC Consolidated Power Corporation
- Operator: SMC Consolidated Power Corporation

Thermal power station
- Primary fuel: Coal

Power generation
- Units operational: 4 × 150 MW
- Nameplate capacity: 600 MW

The Limay Coal Power Plant is a 600-MW coal-fired power station located in Limay, Bataan, Philippines.

== History ==
Owned and operated by the San Miguel Corporation (SMC) Consolidated Power Corporation, the first of four units of the Limay Coal Power Plant in the town of Limay in Bataan province was commissioned in May 2017. The last would be commissioned in July 2019.

The coal-fired power station was built after SMC sold the combined cycle gas turbine (CCGT) power plant within the same town in 2011. SMC had intended to convert the CCGT facility it purchased in 2009 into a natural gas power plant, but eventually abandoned that plan in favour of constructing a new coal-fired power station on another site.

Since 2017, the power plant's operation has been opposed by environmentalist groups.

== Facilities ==
The Limay Coal Power Plant has four 150-MW units, with the whole complex having a capacity of 600-MW.
