= Limay CCGT Power Plant =

Power station in Limay, Bataan, Philippines

- Country: Philippines
- Location: Limay, Bataan
- Coordinates: 14°32′33.8″N 120°35′55.4″E
- Status: Operational
- Commission date: 1993
- Owner: Panasia Energy
- Operator: Millennium Energy

Thermal power station
- Primary fuel: Diesel

Power generation
- Units operational: 2 × 310 MW
- Nameplate capacity: 620 MW

The Limay CCGT Power Plant is a 620 MW diesel-powered power station in Limay, Bataan, Philippines.

== History ==
The Limay Power Plant is commissioned in 1993. The facility was government-owned through the National Power Corporation. It was privatized in 2009 when the Power Sector Assets and Liabilities Management Corp. (PSALM) sold the facility to the San Miguel Corporation in August 2009. There were three prior attempts to bid out the property.

San Miguel had planned to expand the diesel plant, but due to the high cost of diesel, it had abandoned such plans by 2011. Instead, it announced plans to construct a new coal-fired power station.

The Limay facility was sold to Millennium Energy in 2011.

== Facility ==
The Limay facility consisted of two 310 MW modules with a combined capacity of 620 MW. It is a combined cycle gas turbine power station.

== See also ==
- Limay Coal Power Plant
