= Standard Vacuum Oil Company =

American oil company

- Founded: 1931; 95 years ago
- Defunct: 1962; 64 years ago
- Successor: ExxonMobil
- Products: Gasoline; Lubricants
- Owner: Standard Oil of New Jersey; Socony-Vacuum Oil

The Standard Vacuum Oil Company was an American joint venture by Standard Oil of New Jersey and Socony-Vacuum Oil (aka Mobil) established in 1931 to make and market products in the Far East. Around World War I, the market in the Far East was too large to leave unattended, but still small.

Thus these two American oil companies started Standard Vacuum Oil as a joint venture. The two partners would eventually merge into ExxonMobil in 1999.

== History ==
Following the break-up of Standard Oil in 1911, the "Standard Oil Company of New York" (also known for its acronym "Socony") was founded, along with 33 other successor companies. In 1920, the company registered the name "Mobiloil" as a trademark.

Henry Clay Folger was head of the company until 1923, when he was succeeded by Herbert L. Pratt. Beginning February 29, 1928 on NBC, Socony Oil reached radio listeners with a comedy program, Soconyland Sketches, scripted by William Ford Manley and featuring Arthur Allen and Parker Fennelly as rural New Englanders. Socony continued to sponsor the show when it moved to CBS in 1934. In 1935, it became the Socony Sketchbook, with Christopher Morley and the Johnny Green orchestra.

In 1931, Socony merged with Vacuum Oil to form Socony-Vacuum.

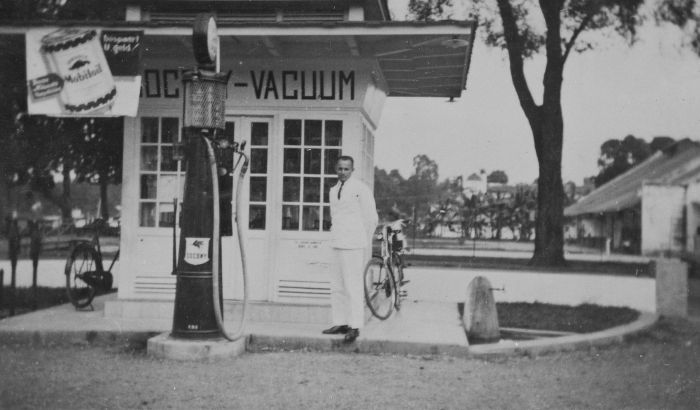
Socony-Vacuum gas station in the Dutch East Indies, c. 1930s–40s

In 1933, Socony-Vacuum and Jersey Standard (which had oil production and refineries in Indonesia) merged their interests in the Far East into a 50–50 joint venture. Standard-Vacuum Oil Co., or "Stanvac," operated in 50 countries, including New Zealand, China, and the region of East Africa, before it was dissolved in 1962.

In 1937 the Standard Vacuum Oil Company of New York helped establish and fund an exploration team to explore for oil in China. They joined with some wealthy Chinese backers who had an oil concession covering several provinces in north-western China, to make an assessment of recent oil discoveries and to possibly join them in the development of oil resources in the region. This led to the beginning of the petroleum industry in China:

Before 1937, Chinese oil production was measured in quarts and, in its crude condition, was used solely as a lubricant. This first well, developed under the most primitive of conditions and with relatively untrained personnel, began to produce over twenty barrels of oil a day. In time, with equipment brought in from Szechuan and elsewhere and the development of several distillation plants, nine more wells were drilled in the immediate area. A letter from my father to T. E. Mobley of Standard Vacuum in June 1942 . . . reported that the Yu Men wells then had a capacity of about 1,000 barrels of oil and 10,000 gallons of gasoline a day, except in winter when cold weather caused the oil to congeal. This was the first major oil field in China. In 1956 a rail link was built to Lanchow; until then, the oil was transported out by truck. A pipeline was constructed in 1957. The Yu Men refinery was enlarged and modernized, and by the late 1960s it was reported that production from that area was "about two million tons"."

By the 1950s, things had changed, and the partners were in disagreement, so in 1962 they split Standard Vacuum between them. Within 10 years, the two companies (Jersey Standard – Southeast Asia, and Mobil Oil – Southeast Asia) were larger than Standard Vacuum was projected to be.

== Bibliography ==
- Weller, J. Marvin. Caravan Across China: An American Geologist Explores the Northwest 1937-1938. (1984). March Hare Publishing, San Francisco. ISBN 0-918295-00-9.
