= Limay =

Municipality in Bataan, Philippines

- Municipality
- Municipality of Limay
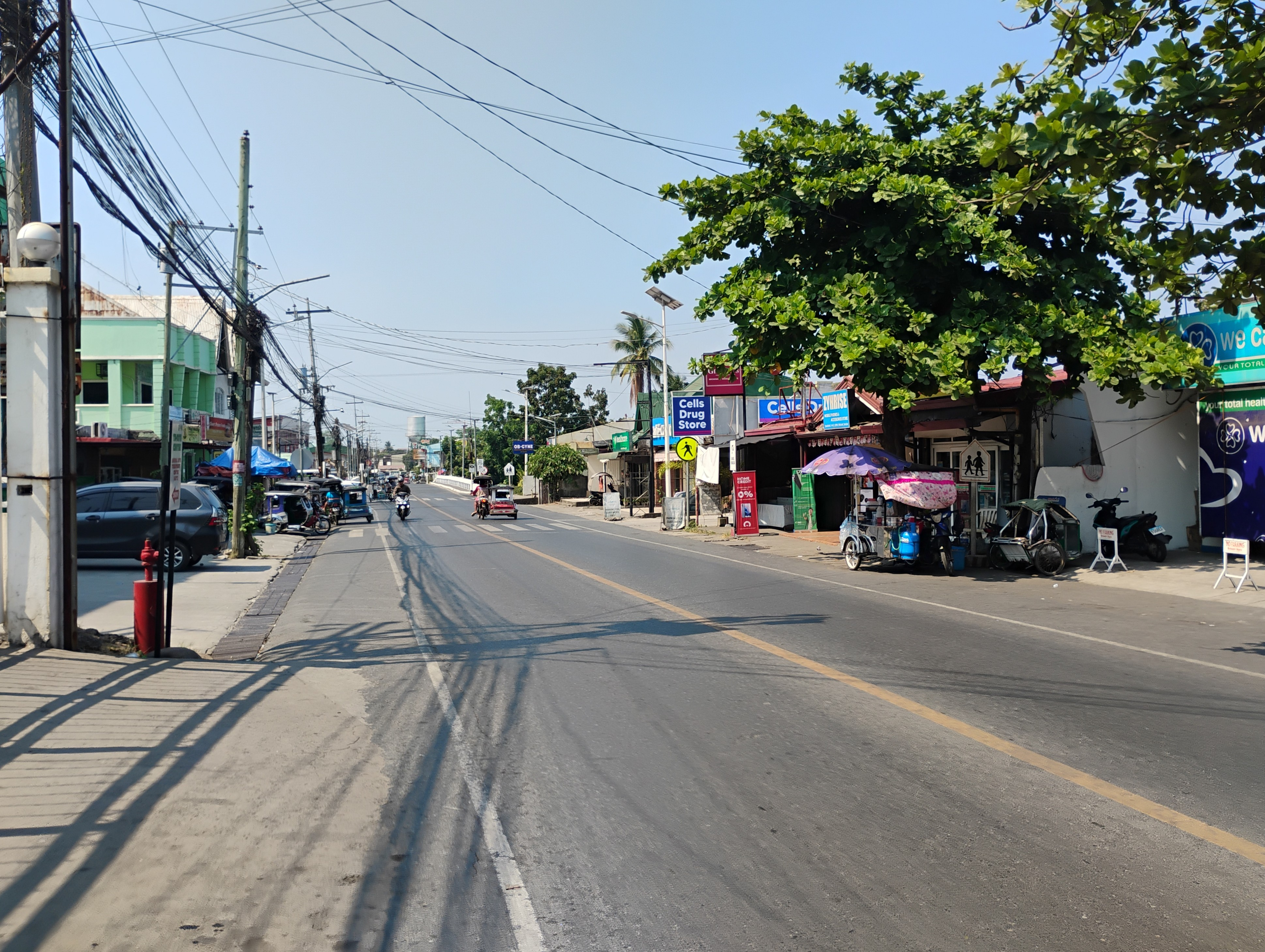
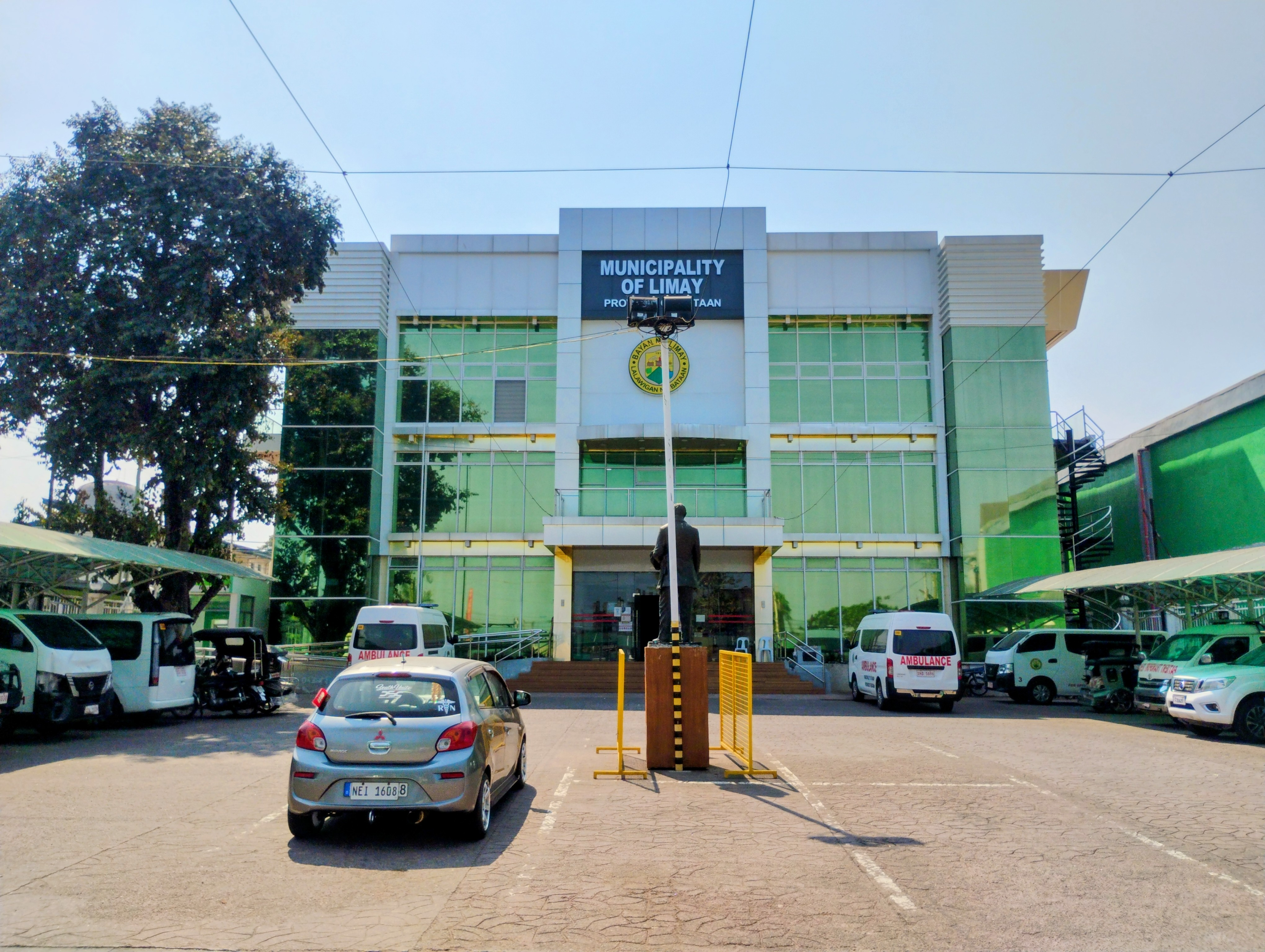
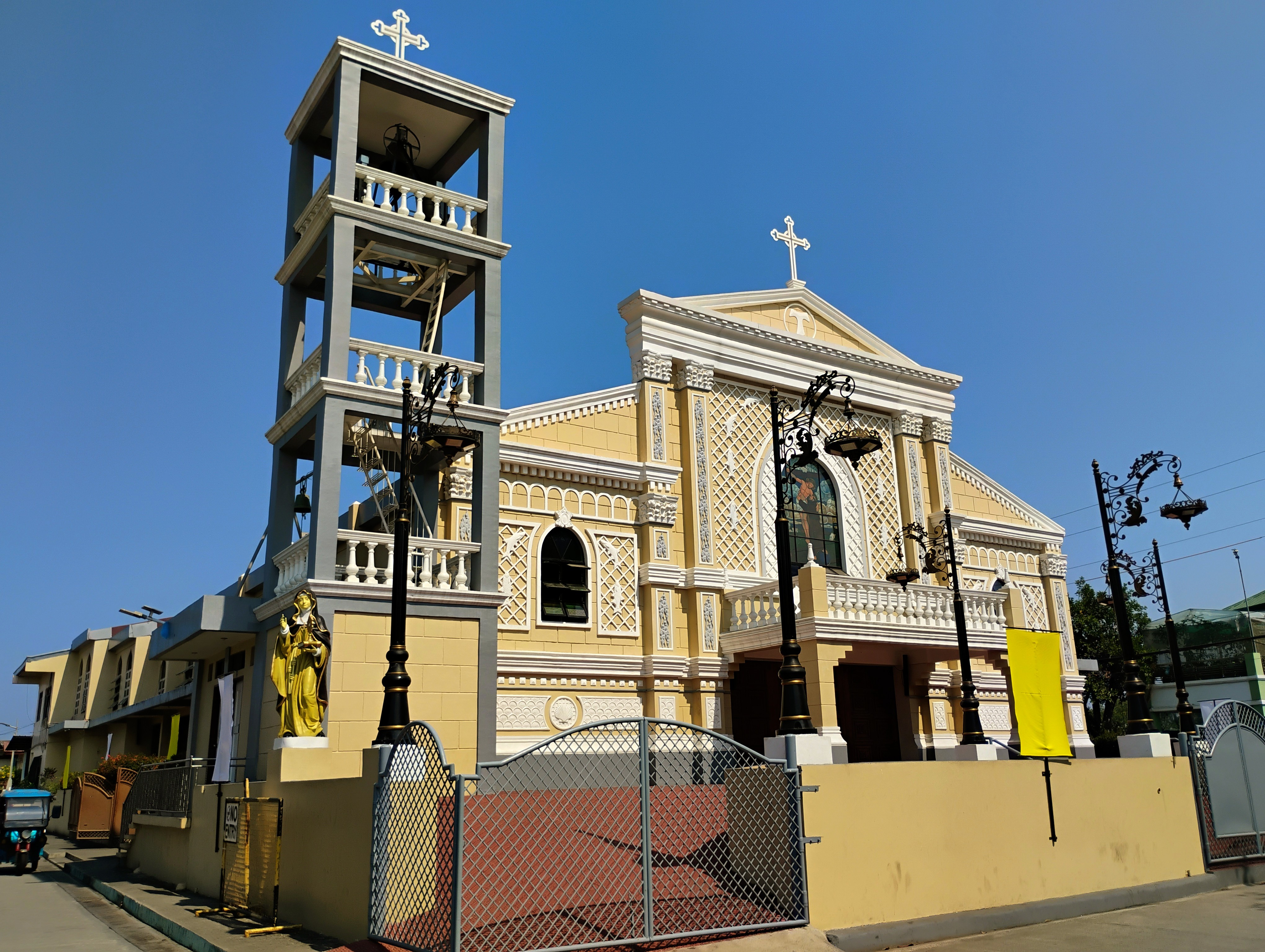
- Limay Town Proper Limay Municipal Hall Saint Francis of Assisi Parish Church

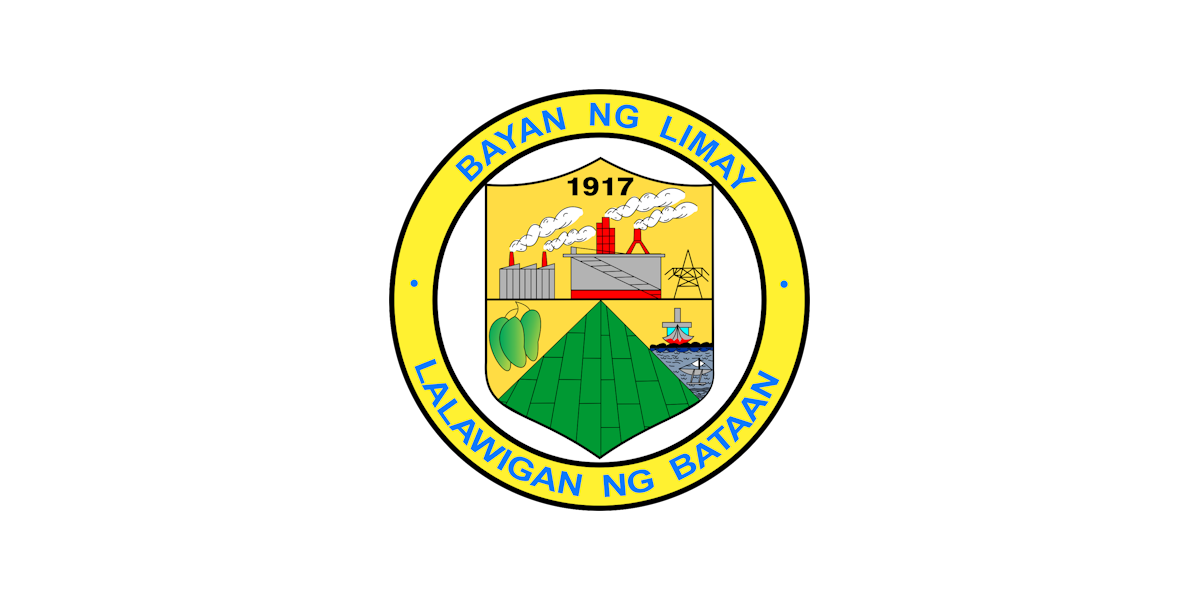
- Flag Seal

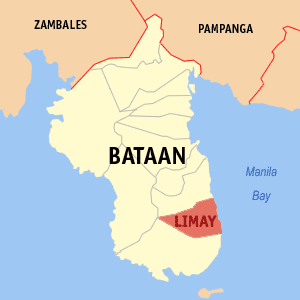
- Map of Bataan with Limay highlighted
- Interactive map of Limay
- Location within the Philippines
- Coordinates: 14°33′43″N 120°35′54″E
- Country: Philippines
- Region: Central Luzon
- Province: Bataan
- District: 2nd district
- Founded: January 1, 1917
- Barangays: 12 (see Barangays)

Government
  - Type: Sangguniang Bayan
  - Mayor: Richie Jason D. David
  - Vice Mayor: Marie Grace David
  - Representative: Albert Raymond S. Garcia
  - Municipal Council: Members: Cecil Gerard C. Roxas; Dennis R. Guchuico; Rosario R. Perez; Manuel P. Ambrocio; Remigio S. Tayag Jr.; Melchor L. Fernando; Restituto Reyes
  - Electorate: 59,060 voters (2025)

Area
  - Total: 103.60 km^{2} (40.00 sq mi)
- Elevation: 52 m (171 ft)
- Highest elevation: 414 m (1,358 ft)
- Lowest elevation: 0 m (0 ft)

Population (2024 census)
  - Total: 81,960
  - Density: 791.1/km^{2} (2,049/sq mi)
  - Households: 19,571

Economy
  - Income class: 1st municipal income class
  - Poverty incidence: 10.89% (2023)
  - Revenue: ₱ 1,265 million (2024)
  - Assets: ₱ 5,913 million (2024)
  - Expenditure: ₱ 972 million (2024)
  - Liabilities: ₱ 1,306 million (2024)

Service provider
  - Electricity: Peninsula Electric Cooperative (PENELCO)
- Time zone: UTC+8 (PST)
- ZIP code: 2103, 2104 (Lamao)
- PSGC: 0300806000
- IDD : area code: +63 (0)47
- Native languages: Mariveleño; Tagalog

Limay, officially the Municipality of Limay (Tagalog: Bayan ng Limay), is a municipality in the province of Bataan, Philippines. According to the 2024 census, it has a population of 81,960 people.

== History ==
Dominican and Franciscan friars settled Limay by the late 1600s, using its rich limestone deposits to build churches in Orion and Balanga. At the time, Limay was a Barangay of Orion.

In the Philippine revolution of 1898, Limay inhabitants fought for their independence. American Governor-General Francis Burton Harrison's Executive Order of January 1, 1917, created Limay as the latest municipality.

In 1913, the Cadwallader-Gibson Lumber Company employed Limayans and Visayan immigrants.

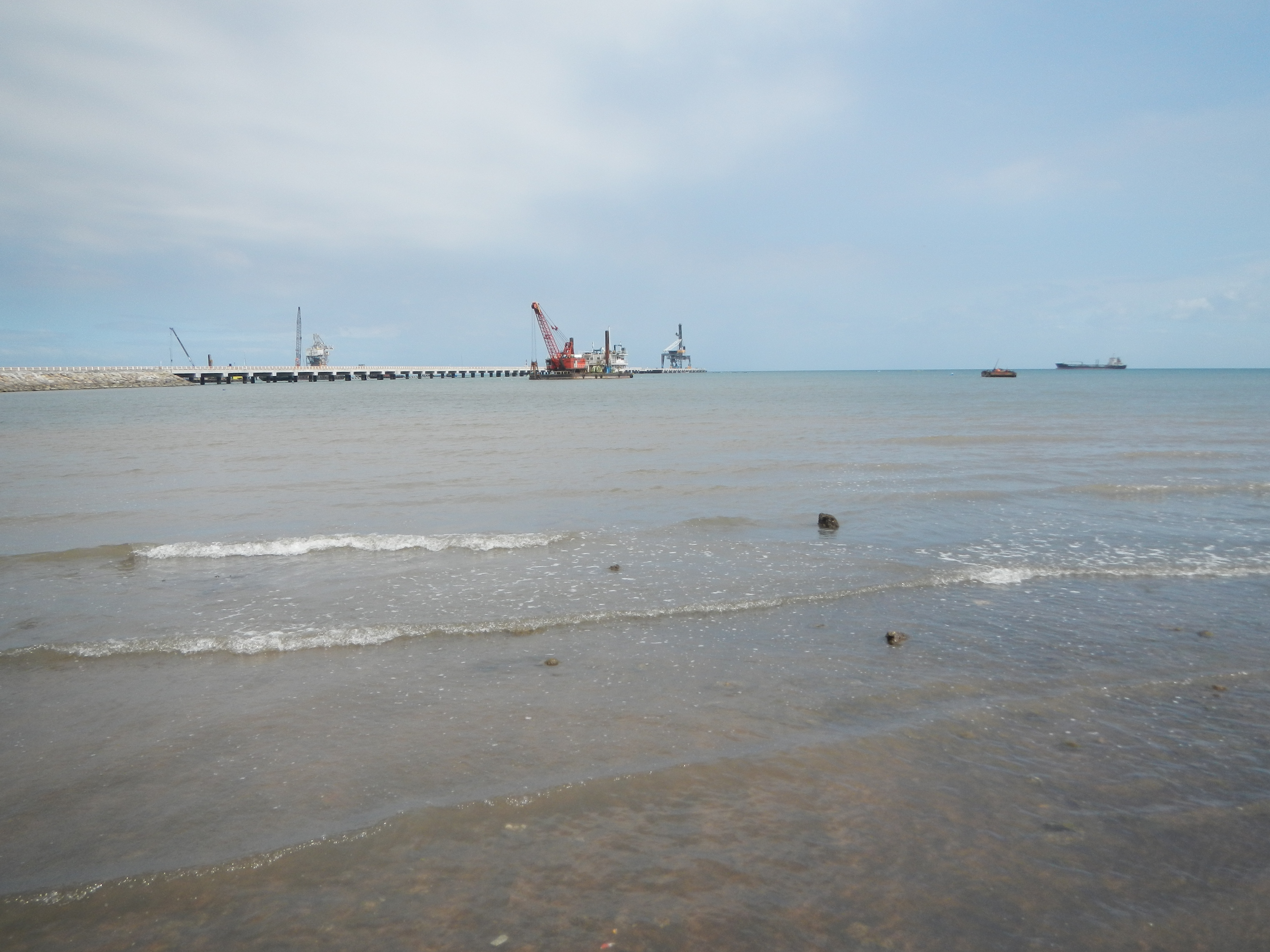
MT Terra Nova submerged off Lamao Point, Limay coast (2015)

During World War II, Limay hosted the first medical hospital of American and Filipino forces, run by the "Angels of Bataan". In Barrio Lamao, Major General Edward P. King capitulated to the Japanese forces, after the last stand of the American and Filipino forces faltered along the banks of the Alangan River.

In 2024, the 2024 Manila Bay oil spill occurred 3.6 nautical miles (6.7 km) off the east coast of Lamao Point, Barangay Lamao. Governor Joet Garcia declared a no-fishing zone on Limay.

== Geography ==
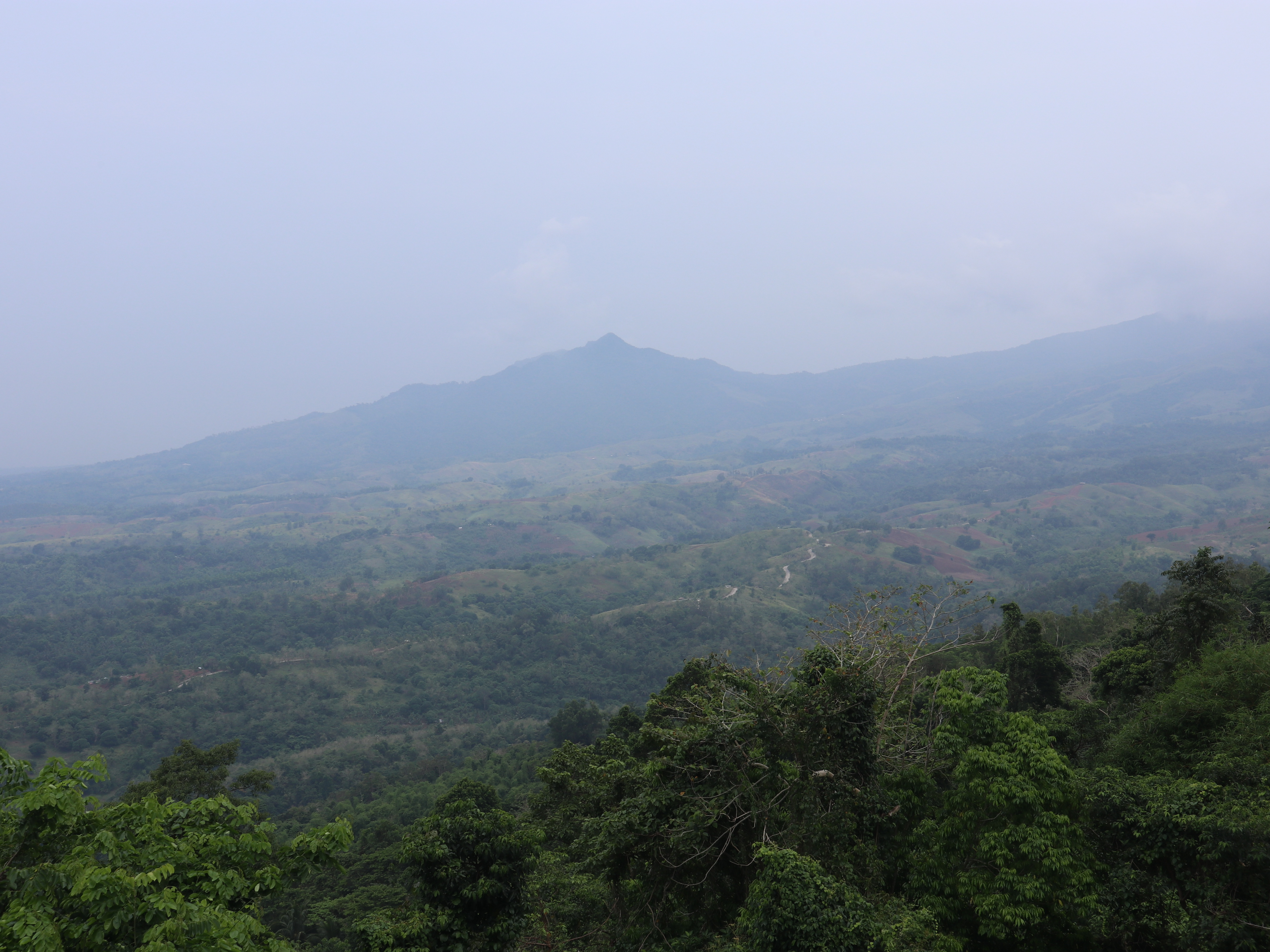
Mount Limay

According to the Philippine Statistics Authority, the municipality has a land area of 103.60 square kilometres (40.00 sq mi) constituting 7.55% of the 1,372.98-square-kilometre- (530.11 sq mi) total area of Bataan.

Limay is accessible via the Bataan Provincial Expressway (N301), off Exit 45. It is 12 kilometres (7.5 mi) from Balanga and 136 kilometres (85 mi) from Manila.

=== Climate ===
Climate data for Limay, Bataan
Month	Jan	Feb	Mar	Apr	May	Jun	Jul	Aug	Sep	Oct	Nov	Dec	Year
Mean daily maximum °C (°F)	31 (88)	32 (90)	34 (93)	35 (95)	33 (91)	31 (88)	29 (84)	29 (84)	29 (84)	29 (84)	30 (86)	31 (88)	31 (88)
Mean daily minimum °C (°F)	19 (66)	19 (66)	20 (68)	23 (73)	25 (77)	25 (77)	24 (75)	25 (77)	25 (77)	24 (75)	23 (73)	20 (68)	23 (73)
Average precipitation mm (inches)	7 (0.3)	8 (0.3)	14 (0.6)	26 (1.0)	127 (5.0)	210 (8.3)	263 (10.4)	272 (10.7)	218 (8.6)	114 (4.5)	46 (1.8)	21 (0.8)	1,326 (52.3)
Average rainy days	4.0	4.0	6.9	11.2	21.0	24.5	27.4	26.9	25.9	21.9	13.4	6.3	193.4
Source: Meteoblue (modeled/calculated data, not measured locally)

=== Barangays ===
Limay is politically subdivided into 12 barangays. Each barangay consists of puroks and some have sitios.

PSGC	Barangay	Population			±% p.a.	
		2024		2010		
030806001	Alangan	7.1%	5,803	4,716	▴	1.45%
030806013	Duale	9.0%	7,358	5,069	▴	2.61%
030806002	Kitang I	2.4%	1,930	1,764	▴	0.62%
030806003	Kitang 2 & Luz	5.8%	4,777	4,563	▴	0.32%
030806004	Lamao	23.6%	19,329	16,256	▴	1.21%
030806006	Landing	3.9%	3,209	3,393	▾	−0.39%
030806007	Poblacion	0.9%	701	770	▾	−0.65%
030806008	Reformista	8.4%	6,900	4,149	▴	3.58%
030806014	San Francisco de Asis	7.2%	5,900	5,398	▴	0.62%
030806015	Saint Francis II	10.5%	8,615	5,899	▴	2.66%
030806009	Townsite	6.3%	5,178	4,646	▴	0.75%
030806012	Wawa	0.7%	560	584	▾	−0.29%
	Total		81,960	57,207	▴	2.52%

== Demographics ==
Population census of Limay

Year	Pop.	±% p.a.
1918	3,583	—
1939	3,978	+0.50%
1948	4,509	+1.40%
1960	7,126	+3.89%
1970	12,912	+6.12%

Year	Pop.	±% p.a.
1975	18,182	+7.11%
1980	24,281	+5.95%
1990	32,629	+3.00%
1995	40,092	+3.93%
2000	46,620	+3.29%

Year	Pop.	±% p.a.
2007	54,782	+2.25%
2010	57,207	+1.59%
2015	68,071	+3.37%
2020	78,272	+2.98%
2024	81,960	+1.11%

Source: Philippine Statistics Authority

In the 2024 census, Limay had a population of 81,960 people. The population density was 790 inhabitants per square kilometre (2,000/sq mi).

=== Religion ===
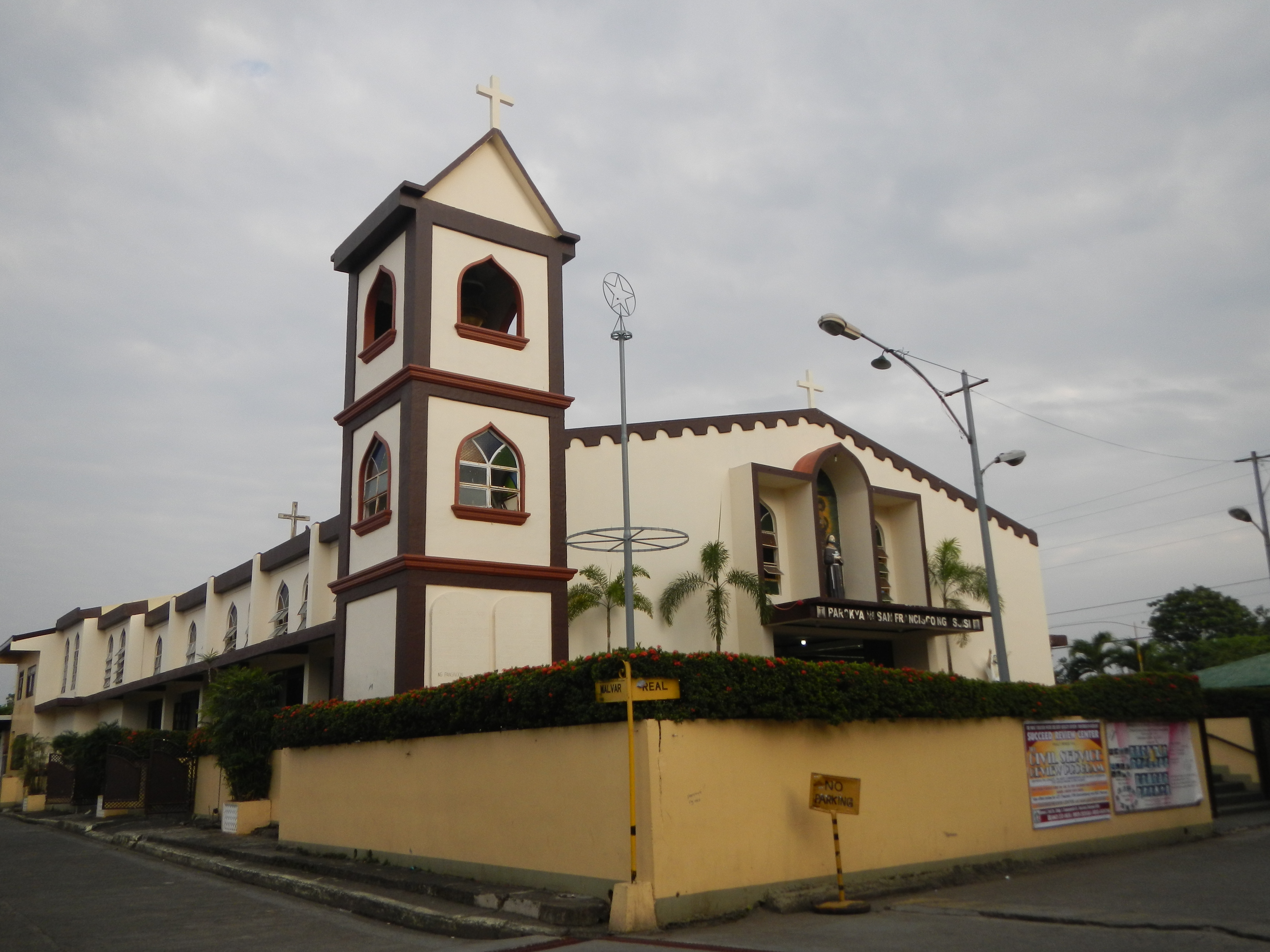
Saint Francis of Assisi Parish Church

The 1935 Saint Francis of Assisi Parish Church is under the Vicariate of Saint Michael Archangel. It belongs to the Roman Catholic Diocese of Balanga.

== Economy ==
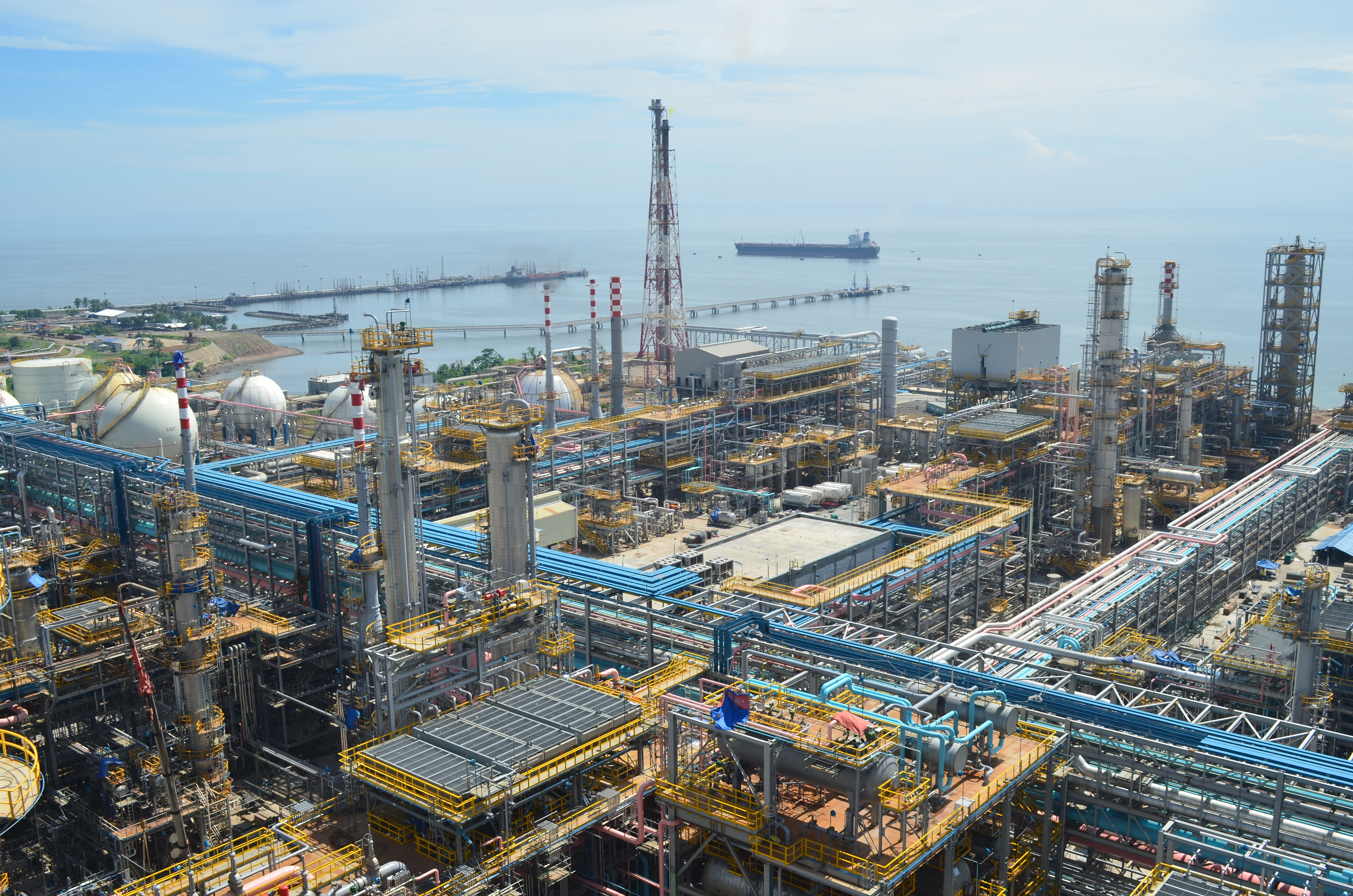
Petron Bataan Refinery

Poverty incidence of Limay (%)

Source: Philippine Statistics Authority

Significant economic buildings and projects:

- Limay public market and slaughterhouse
- Bataan Limay Refinery Project, 140-megawatt power plant — P78B Petron Expansion Project.
- Limay power plant
- Port of Limay

== Government ==
=== Local government ===
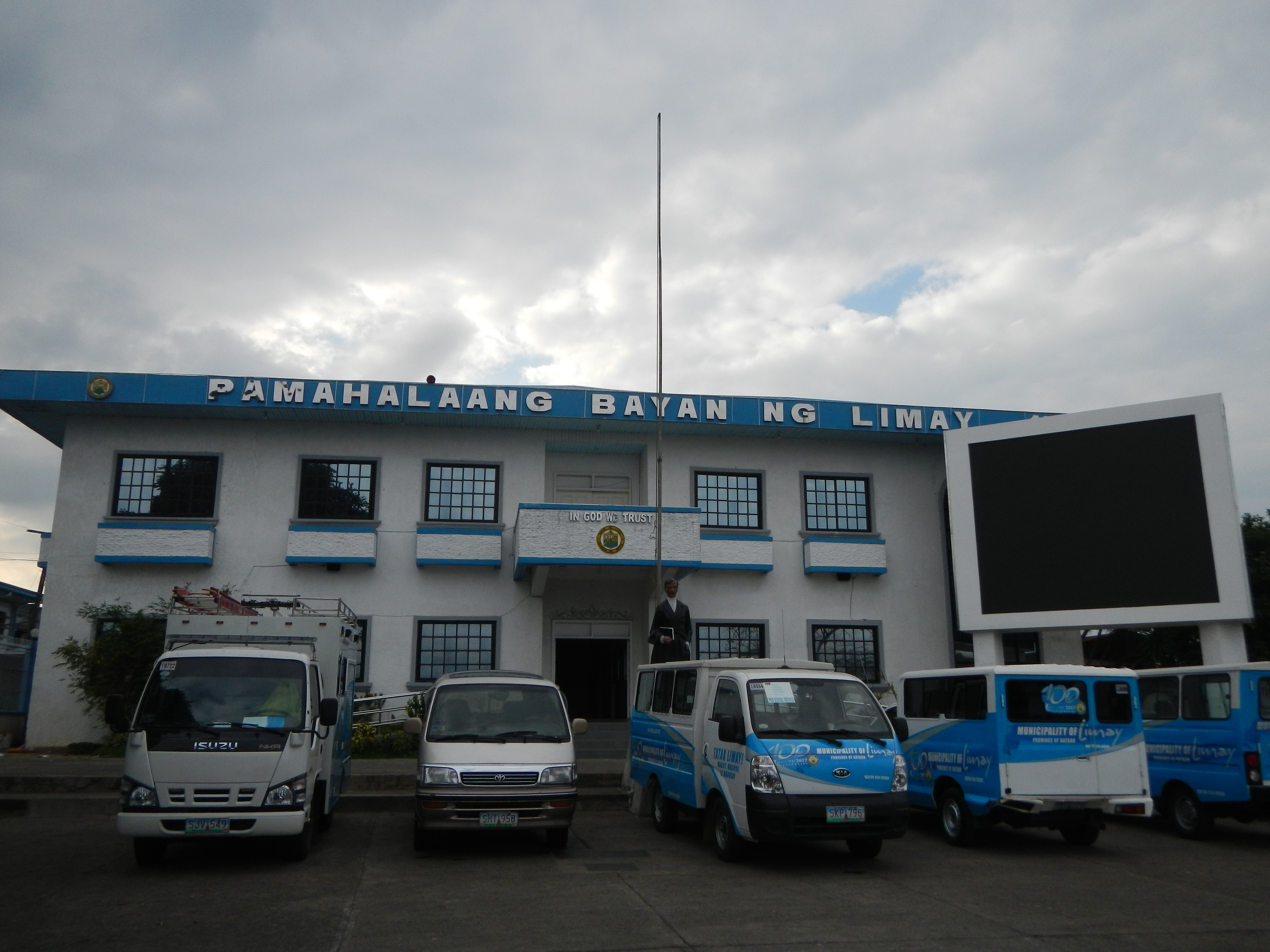
Municipal hall

Pursuant to the local government, the political seat of the municipal government is located at the Municipal Hall. In the Spanish colonial period, the Gobernadorcillo was the Chief Executive who held office in the Presidencia. During the American rule (1898–1946), the elected Mayor and local officials, including the appointed ones held office at the Municipal Hall. The legislative and executive departments perform their functions in the Sangguniang Bayan (Session Hall) and Municipal Trial Court, respectively, and are located in the Town Hall.

=== Elected officials ===
Members of the Limay Municipal Council (2022-2025):

- District Representative (2nd Legislative District, Bataan): Albert Raymond S. Garcia
- Municipal Mayor: Richie Jason D. David
- Municipal Vice Mayor: Sarah V. David
- Municipal Councilors:
  - Cecil Gerard C. Roxas
  - Dennis R. Gochuico
  - Manuel P. Ambrocio
  - Rosario R. Perez
  - Remigio S. Tayag Jr.
  - Melchor L. Fernando
  - Restituto P. Reyes

These officials hold their office at the newly constructed Batasang Bayan in Barangay Poblacion, inside Limay Park facility along the Limay coastline.

== Tourism ==
Limay's attractions, events, and historical landmarks include:

- 263 hectares military reservation (the DND Arsenal – Government Arsenal) — Headquarters at Camp General Antonio Luna
- Mariveles Mountain Complex — mountain range stretching from Mariveles to Mount Limay (or Mount Cayapo) – 393 metres (1,289 ft) higher than Mount Samat in Pilar — and with Mount Tarak
- Judy's Park (Limay Municipal Park) — esplanade along Manila Bay with retaining walls and kiosks
- Tikip and Biga Waterfalls — 30-foot (9.1 m)t falls nestled deep in the Limay mountain range
- Saint Joseph's annual running of the bulls
- Peninsula Golf and Country Club — 18-hole golf course inside the Petron Bataan Refinery.
- Limay Sports Complex and Tennis Court
- Apo Iko Fiesta Parade — October 4
- Pagbubunyi Festival — May 4
- Limay Tanod Appreciation Day — June

== Education ==
The Limay Schools District Office governs all educational institutions within the municipality. It oversees the management and operations of all private and public, from primary to secondary schools.

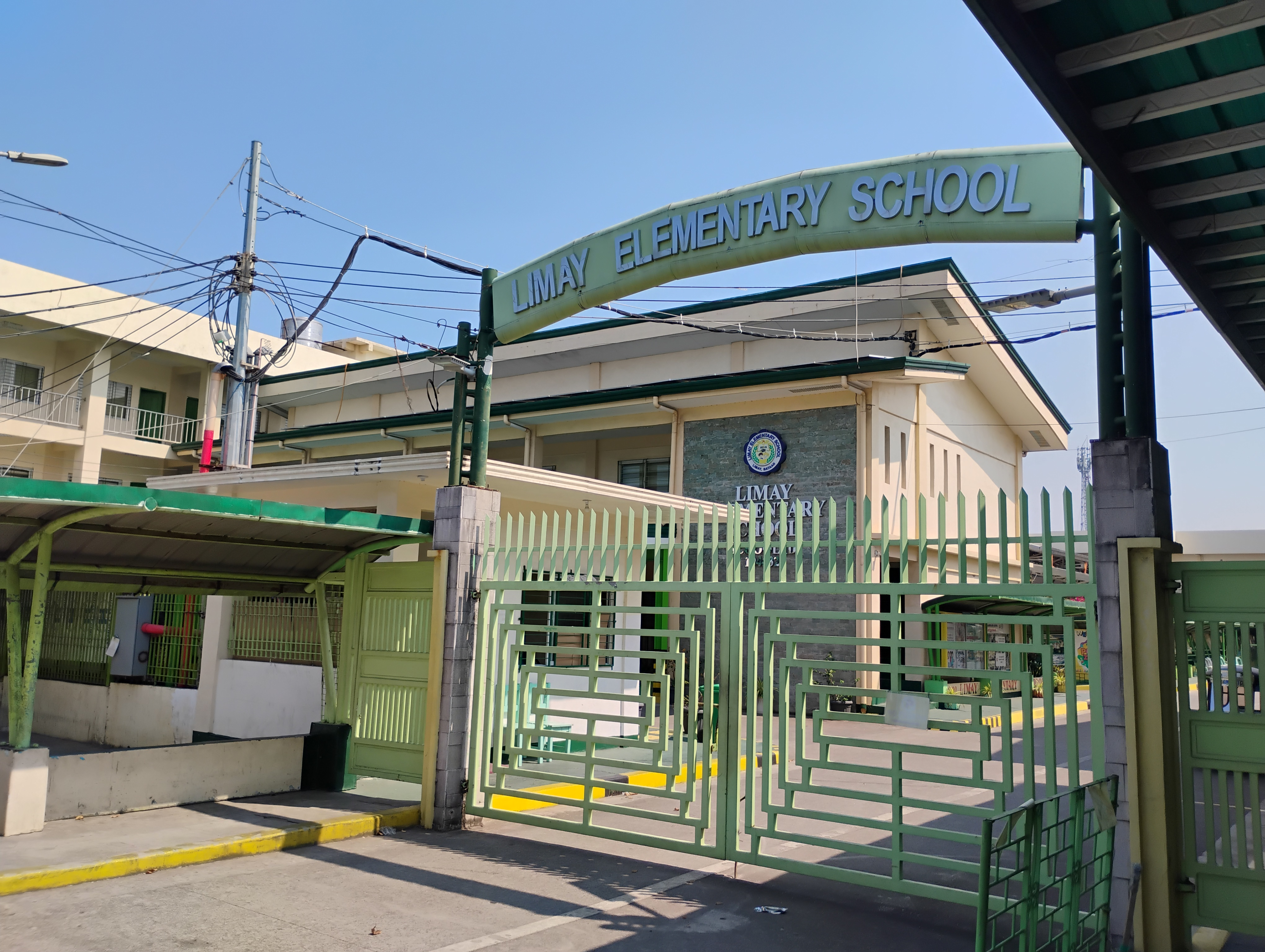
Limay Elementary School

=== Primary and elementary schools ===
- Alangan Elementary School
- Arsenal Elementary School
- Bliss Elementary School
- Carbon Elementary School
- Crossroad House of Faith Christian School
- Daughters of St. Dominic School
- Duale Elementary School
- Gabaldon Elementary School
- Higher Ground Ecumenical Learning School
- House of Achievers Montessori School
- Kinaragan Elementary School
- Kitang Elementary School
- Lamao Elementary School
- Limay Elementary School
- Luz Elementary School
- Northridge Montessori School of Limay
- Peas Elementary School
- St. Francis ES Elementary School (Bacong)
- St. Francis II Elementary School
- The Peninsula School

=== Secondary schools ===
- Lamao National High School
- Limay National High School
- St. Francis National High School
- West Philippines Institute of Tourism Science and Technology

=== Tertiary schools ===
- Limay Polytechnic College

== See also ==
- 2024 Manila Bay oil spill
