= Transco =

Transco may refer to:

- Transco, former name of National Grid Gas plc, part of British utility company National Grid plc
- National Transmission Corporation, known as TransCo, a Philippine government corporation that is an owner of Philippine power grid portions acquired and designated before its turnover to National Grid Corporation of the Philippines (NGCP) on January 15, 2009, and supervises the latter
- Transcontinental Pipeline, a natural gas company in the United States
- Transmarine Corporation shipping
