= Richard Heydarian =

Filipino political scientist and author

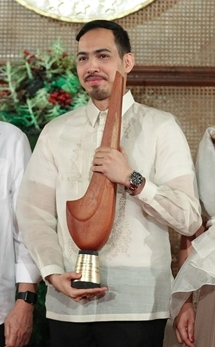
- Heydarian in 2016 receiving the TOYM award
- Born: Richard Javad Foronda Heydarian; Baguio, Philippines
- Education: University of the Philippines Diliman (BA, MIS); Oriel College, Oxford (MPP)
- Occupations: Writer; TV Host; Political Economist; Podcaster
- Employers: Philippine Daily Inquirer; University of the Philippines Diliman; One News; formerly GMA Network & ABS-CBN
- Known for: South China Sea dispute expertise; Philippine politics, Democracy and Populism analysis
- Television: The View From Manila (One News) With Due Respect ((PRTV Prime Media))
- Awards: Ten Outstanding Young Persons of the World TOYP; Ten Outstanding Young Men TOYM; KBP Golden Dove Awards

Instagram information
- Page: Richard Heydarian (Deep Dive)

Substack information
- Notes: @https://richardheydarian.substack.com/
- Years active: 2024-present
- Topics: Politics & Economics

TikTok information
- Page: Richard Heydarian (Deep Dive)

X information
- Handle: @@RichHeydarian
- Display name: Richard Heydarian

YouTube information
- Channel: Richard Heydarian (Deep Dive)
- Years active: 2021–present
- Genres: Politics & Education
- Subscribers: 228 thousand
- Views: 70 million
- Facebook: Richard Foronda Heydarian/Richard Heydarian Followers: 455,000 (October 2026)
- Last updated: October 2026

Richard Javad Foronda Heydarian is a Filipino political scientist, public thinker, and media personality. As an academic and global columnist, he has penned numerous articles for global media outlets, including The New York Times, Foreign Affairs, and The Guardian, as well as authored or co-authored more than a dozen academic books. He has been described as "a leading voice on Philippine politics, ASEAN, Asian geopolitics, and populism." He has also been regularly interviewed by ABC Australia, Al Jazeera, BBC, Bloomberg, CNN International, CNBC, and DW. As a global affairs specialist, he has been interviewed by journalists such as Christiane Amanpour, Fareed Zakaria, and Maria Ressa. An advocate for human rights and a prominent critic of authoritarian leaders, most notably President Rodrigo Duterte, he has repeatedly faced online attacks and legal harassment throughout the years. Heydarian, along with two other respondents, won a landmark Supreme Court case in mid-2026 affirming his freedom of speech in light of his public criticism of the high court's ruling regarding Vice-President Sara Duterte's impeachment.

Heydarian is also a regular contributor to London-based Monocle Magazine; a columnist for the Philippine Daily Inquirer, the Philippines' newspaper of record; and regularly writes for international outlets such as the Nikkei Asia Global South World and the South China Morning Post. Heydarian has met and/or exchanged views with global leaders including Malaysian Prime Minister Mahathir Mohamad, German Chancellor Olaf Scholz, and US Secretary of State Henry Kissinger. He is the host of The View from Manila on One News TV Channel, and "With Due Respect" on PRTV Prime Media, and also hosts multiple podcasts, including Deep Dive with Richard Heydarian, as well as "Oxford Policy Pod", hosted by the Blavatnik School of Government, and The Bridge, which focuses on ASEAN–Europe ties and is a project supported by the European Parliament. He is also active on social media, including his YouTube channel (Richard Heydarian Deep Dive). He also hosts the "Utak Forum", which he brings together top experts and policy-makers focusing on South China Sea and foreign policy issues. As a cultural figure, he has been featured in lifestyle publications, including in Tatler magazine's "Asia's Most Stylish" issue in 2022.

== Early life and education ==
Heydarian was born in Baguio in Benguet. Heydarian father is Nasser Heydarian, an Iranian, and his mother is an Ilocano. Heydarian moved to Metro Manila for higher education, where he took a Bachelor of Arts in political science and a Master in International Studies at the University of the Philippines Diliman. He was formerly based in Oriel College, where he pursued a master's degree in public policy at the University of Oxford.

Heydarian is a lifetime member of the Oxford Union. He is also a board member on multiple foundations, including Team Pinas Foundation and We Protect Our Seas (WPS).

He also practices martial arts, and holds a black belt in taekwondo. He has transitioned into mixed martial arts, because "You can never rely on just one area of strength nor can you exclusively lean on past templates. You need to evolve and incorporate new elements into your tool kit." Heydarian has often written critically about his hometown, bemoaning its gradual decline throughout the decades, especially following the post-earthquake reconstruction era. Nevertheless, he has always held Baguio as a potential cite for progressive politics due to its "vibrant local democracy anchored by an energetic middle class and a cosmopolitan culture".

== Background ==
=== Academia ===
Heydarian began his career in academia, teaching at Ateneo de Manila University and later at De La Salle University in the early 2010s. As a researcher, Heydarian began as a consultant to the German think tank Friedrich-Ebert-Stiftung, Manila office, and was also the editor-in-chief of Socdem Asia, the magazine and publication outlet for the alliance of social democratic and progressive parties in the Indo-Pacific region. He is also a contributor to International Politics and Society magazine, published by the Friedrich-Ebert-Stiftung's Brussels office, and a magazine for social democratic thinkers.

Richard Heydarian has been operating at the interstices of academe, journalism, think tank circles, and activism. He has taught at the University of the Philippines Diliman, Ateneo de Manila University, and De La Salle University. He has also presented lectures and talks at universities such as Harvard University, Stanford University, University of California Berkeley, Johns Hopkins University, Leiden University, and Australian National University. He has also contributed to and given talks at think tanks such as the Council on Foreign Relations (CFR), Center for Strategic and International Studies (CSIS), and Brookings Institution, and the Lowy Institute. He has been described as among the "most prolific and interviewed geopolitical analyst[s] currently writing and speaking not only in the Philippines but arguably in Southeast Asia as well" by the Stanford University

He previously served as Professorial Chairholder and Associate Professor at Polytechnic University of the Philippines. Heydarian is currently a senior lecturer at the UP Asian Center, where he teaches graduate courses on international affairs in Asia and the broader Indo-Pacific region.

=== Television and media ===
Heydarian transitioned from teaching to mainstream media, serving as a resident analyst at ABS-CBN News Channel and, a year later, as a resident political analyst and host of Stand for Truth at GMA Network. He has also served as resident analyst/host at ABS-CBN News Channel, GMA Network and One News/TV5.

He is also a television host at One News, where his show, The View From Manila, was nominated for the "Best Current Affairs" program at the Asian Television Awards 2023.

He began his writing career as a regular contributor to The Huffington Post, where he wrote on Asian affairs and domestic Philippine politics. In 2018, he joined the Philippine Daily Inquirer, becoming one of the youngest columnists in the newspaper's history. The same year, he won the Ten Outstanding Young Persons of the Year award by the Junior Chamber International for his contributions to public policy discourse and social sciences. He had previously won the Ten Outstanding Young Men award in 2016.

His articles and interviews have appeared on The Atlantic, BBC, Bloomberg, The Economist, The Financial Times, Foreign Affairs, The Guardian, The New York Times, Time, Nikkei Asian Review, South China Morning Post, The Straits Times, The Wall Street Journal, and The Washington Post.

== Political views and advocacy ==
A vocal critic of authoritarian populism, Heydarian has faced constant online harassment, death threats, and even legal harassment from supporters of Rodrigo Duterte presidency. In 2019, Heydarian published a blank column on Duterte's "independent foreign policy", a satirical critique of the Filipino leader's pro-China policies amid ongoing tensions in the South China Sea. Shortly after, the country's Land Transportation Office (LTO) called him out for alleged 'reckless driving' and subpoenaed him based on a picture that showed Heydarian with his pet in the driving seat. "The car is obviously parked and I'm clearly in a corner. We were in a stopover when the dog came over. We just thought it was a very cute picture," he said. "The LTO's post is an extension of the [pro-Duterte trolls] line. The [pro-Duterte] propagandists are completely twisting it. The LTO's [Facebook administrator] used the DDS' line," Heydarian said.

In 2025, he faced yet another frivolous charge when a group of Duterte-aligned figures filed an "indirect contempt" petition against him at the Philippine Supreme Court following his online comments on the high court's ruling on the constitutionality of Vice President Sara Duterte's impeachment trial. Heydarian's legal team responded by clarifying the context of his public interventions and claimed malicious twisting of his words by politically motivated groups seeking to silence dissent. Aside from accusing the petitioners of weaponizing legal instruments, they also detected serious problems in the petition, including sloppy citation and non-existent jurisprudence. In response, the petitioners were forced to submit an amended version of their petition to the Supreme Court, where they expressed how they "deeply apologiz[e] to [the Supreme Court] … and recogniz[e] with humility" their numerous "lapses." The petitioners also admitted the need to "correct certain jurisprudential citations inadvertently and mistakenly relied upon in the original petition."

Almost a year later, the Philippine Supreme Court affirmed Heydarian's right to express public opinion on the matter in a landmark ruling, which also cleared two other respondents from charges of indirect contempt against the country's highest court. In an 87-page en banc decision promulgated on April 8, 2026 and released in July 2026, the high court dismissed the charges against Heydarian et al. as “nothing more than hollow assertions, which are devoid of factual or legal substance.” According to the Supreme Court: “The petitions do not demonstrate a direct and substantial link between the impugned statements and any actual tendency of inciting the public to, likely and imminently, obstruct, degrade or interfere with the orderly administration of justice.” The ruling penned by Senior Associate Justice Marvic Leonen made it clear that the “incitement test [for determining whether a speech act was a form of contempt against the Supreme Court must] incite the public to lose trust in the judiciary and the imminence and likelihood of this intended effect must also be established...From the text itself, respondent Heydarian’s statement does not suggest any inciting or rallying to commit lawlessness. There is also no likelihood that it shall produce imminent lawlessness. Clearly, the form, style and nature of respondent Heydarian’s statements are not provocative or direct enough to be a call to commit crimes or to disregard the laws.”

Heydarian's political activism and role as a public intellectual grew out of his early exposure to social democratic ideals and organizations, particularly his work at The Friedrich Ebert Stiftung, which shaped his views on economics, politics and foreign policy. Against the backdrop of global uncertainty and rise of alt-right populism, he considers himself as a "progressive realist", who appreciates the need for proactive social mobilization, coalition-building with likeminded forces, robust social safety nets combined with more centrist social policies, as well as deterrence and balance of power in matters of geopolitics. He is also a major proponent of a more proactive and autonomous Philippine foreign policy as well as a greater role for Global South nations and cooperation among likeminded post-colonial nations. Accordingly, he prefers middle powers such as the Philippines to resist any undue pressure and unilateralism by any superpower, including the incoming Trump 2.0 administration. He is, however, an advocate of 'minilateralism', and has dubbed the term, "JAPHUS", referring to the Japan-Philippine-US trilateral alliance.

As a prominent voice on ASEAN affairs, he was among speakers at the ASEAN Business and Investment Summit in Jakarta in 2023. Following his participation at the 2025 ASEAN Economic Opinion Leaders Conference, which was hosted by Malaysia's Ministry of Investment, Trade and Industry (MITI), Heydarian argued in favor of a more proactive and coherent regional approach to a new era of great power competition. Responding to Singaporean diplomat Kausikan Bilahari famous argument on how ASEAN is more like a "cow" than a "horse", Heydarian has argued "the least ASEAN can do is to become a "donkey" similar to "Dapple" in Don Quixote: a tad slow and lacking flair, but impeccably sturdy and reliable. Otherwise, the regional body risks being consigned to a laughing stock among major powers and a marginal player in shaping the broader Indo-Pacific region."

In an era of great power competition, Heydarian argues that ASEAN states have engaged in "fifty shades of hedging" in order to preserve their strategic autonomy. He is also critical of what he calls "strategic gaslighting", namely when smaller nations as varied as Ukraine, the Philippines and Taiwan are blamed for being bullied or even invaded by bigger powers. At times, major powers such as China, Heydarian argues, accuse smaller neighbors of provocation, when the latter resists expansionist activities by bigger neighbors. He is also a strong believer in 'industrial policy', and the need for service-oriented economies such as the Philippines' to shift to manufacturing, with a focus on semiconductors and EV batter production. This is the best way, according to Heydarian, to create sustainable development and inclusive growth.

As for new power grouping such as BRICS (Brazil, Russia, India, and China), Heydarian believes they are important indicators of a major shift in the global balance of power towards post-American multipolarity, although remains skeptical of the actual projects and initiatives of the power grouping. Although impressed by China's industrial policy and economic miracle, Heydarian is also skeptical of its investment promises. He dubbed the term "pledge trap", which refers to prospective beneficiaries "forward-deploying strategic concessions in exchange for broadly illusory investment pledges." Nevertheless, Heydarian has argued that BRICS' continued expansion—now including Southeast Asia's largest economy, Indonesia, which is also among the world's most populous nations—indicates the (i) prestige rising powers attach to joining the new power grouping; (ii) the need to hedge against US sanctions—Vietnam has robust ties to Russia's sanctioned defense industry, while Malaysia has been a conduit for sanctioned Iranian oil—and potentially destabilizing impact of Trump policies on US dollar stability via unsustainable fiscal practices; and, more concretely, (iii) expanding bilateral currency swap deals and financial integration among major BRICS nations, with Russia de-dollarizing close to 90 percent of its trade with major powers such as India as well as establishing direct financial linkages with Iran to circumvent Western sanctions.

He has also written extensively about Philippine domestic politics and has been an advocate for a revitalized opposition. Accordingly, he has focused on the role of prominent leaders such as Risa Hontiveros, Leila de Lima, and Leni Robredo – and ways for unifying and mobilizing liberal-progressive and broader democratic forces in the country. For Heydarian, the Latin American "Pink Tide" progressive movements could serve a potential inspiration for the Philippines, especially given the massive mobilization of the "Pink Movement" during the 2022 presidential elections. 'Over the past two decades, the region has produced, against all odds, a wave of progressive-charismatic leaders, who collectively belong to the so-called "Pink Tide",' Heydarian argued. 'In many ways, we are collectively more similar to Latin America and other former Spanish colonies than neighboring Asian states..."' Analyzing the success of progressive leaders in Latin America, Heydarian emphasized the role of "sustained and full-scale mobilization of the civil society beyond election cycles alone" and how they shunned "half-hearted reforms or tired liberal clichés. They succeeded because they offered nothing short of transformational reform in a broken political system."

Heydarian is also a social media influencer and has online presence in Facebook, Twitter, and YouTube. His podcast Deep Dive w/ Richard Heydarian has consistently ranked among top 100 podcasts in the country in Rephonic. He is also the host of the "UTAK FORUM", which regularly brings together experts and policy-makers to discuss South China Sea and foreign policy issues. A mix of podcast and panel discussion, the forum also serves as a press conference to discuss pressing national security issues in the country Heydarian has consistently challenged political orthodoxies, liberal elitism, persistent deficiencies of opposition groups, and has even publicly debated with leading propagandists aligned with the controversial Rodrigo Duterte presidency.

== Controversies ==
=== Mindanao statement ===
During an interview with the CNN on the arrest of Rodrigo Duterte by the International Criminal Court, Heydarian compared Duterte's influence and enduring base of support to the MAGA movement, a term popularized by Donald Trump during his 2016 campaign and reused for the 2024 presidential run. When asked about Duterte's support base, Heydarian cited several factors, most notably the immense developmental disparities in the country and the neglect of national government for the southern island. Heydarian, who was born in Baguio in northern Philippines, mentioned how the Human Development Index in some parts of Mindanao—Duterte's political stronghold and the base of his presidential rise— is similar to those in Sub-Saharan Africa:

Their base of support, first of all, is in the south of the Philippines, the so-called 'Solid South' in the Mindanao region, where there is a lot of legitimate grievances against the national government. I mean, it is one of the poorest areas of the country. I come from the Northern Luzon [Baguio] where our Human Development Index is almost Southern Europe. But if you go to [parts] Mindanao, their Human Development Index is [similar to] Sub-Saharan African [nations].

When spliced portions of his interviews went viral online, it quickly sparked online backlash, particularly among the people of Mindanao, who found the comparison—based on HDI scores—demeaning. A Cagayan De Oro councilor challenged Heydarian regarding the Sub-Sahara statement to visit Mindanao particularly in Northern Mindanao to see it for himself how developed the region was. In addition to the outrage, many people responded with humor and sarcasm, posting memes about "Sub-Saharan Mindanao".

In response, Heydarian, in a video post on Facebook, reiterated that his words were taken out of context and deliberately twisted by what he described as "fake news peddlers", referring to alleged troll farms aligned to the Dutertes. "The Duterte-backed troll machine was intent on splicing and maliciously twisting my words out of context in one of my interviews on the ICC arrest, where I highlighted, inter alia, the injustices against Mindanao by comparing its Human Development Index (HDI) to some Sub-Saharan African nations." Nevertheless, Heydarian also expressed apology for any unintended hurt and insisted he did not intend to insult anyone. "If anyone felt hurt I apologize. I didn't mean to insult anyone. It was a one minute I had to explain the development gap and injustice of that that we have to solve.. I apologize if people felt offended based on the fake news because I really care about our folks in Mindanao," he added.

== Awards and academic work ==
As an academic, he has authored or co-authored more than a dozen books, including "The Indo-Pacific: Trump, China, and the New Struggle for Global Mastery" (Palgrave Macmillan); "Asia's New Battlefield" (Zedbooks, London); and "How Capitalism Failed the Arab World" (Zedbooks, London); His book "The Rise of Duterte: A Populist Revolt Against Elite Democracy", published by Palgrave Macmillan (London), was featured in The Financial Times' "Best of Weekend Long Reads" list. The book represents the first internationally published analysis of President Rodrigo Duterte's presidency and its implications for the Philippines and beyond.

He has also co-authored and/or contributed chapters to leading academic publications and authoritative edited volumes, including "Subaltern Populism – Dutertismo and the War on Constitutional Democracy" (Cambridge University Press, 2022); "Penal Populism in Emerging Markets: Human Rights and Democracy in the Age of Strongmen" (Cambridge University Press, 2020); as well as "Genealogy of Conflict: The roots, evolution, and trajectory of the South China Sea disputes" (Routledge, 2017); "The Struggle for Centrality ASEAN, the South China Sea, and the Sino-American New Cold War?" (Routledge, 2022) "Philippines' Counter-Terror Conundrum: Marawi and Duterte's Battle Against the Islamic State" (Routledge, 2019) and "The Shifting Sands: Duterte, the Philippines, and ASEAN's Evolving Relations with the DPRK" (Routledge, 2024) and "At a Strategic Crossroads: ASEAN Centrality amid Sino-American Rivalry in the Indo-Pacific" (Brookings Institution, 2021).

He also contributed to prominent edited volumes, including "The WikiLeaks Fallout: Strategic Implications for the U.S.- ASEAN Relations", in "The Wikileaks Files: What the Cables Tell us about the American Empire" (Verso, 2015) as well as Oxford Bibliographie, "Politics of the Philippines: From Rizal to Duterte" (Oxford University Press) and "The US-Philippine-China Triangle: From Equi-Balancing to Counter- Balancing amid the South China Sea Disputes" in "Regional Power Shift in the Making? The Rise of China and the South China Sea Disputes" (Springer, 2015, Feb/March)

He is also a regular contributor to the prestigious Journal of Democracy academic publication, where he primarily focuses on issues of democratization, authoritarian populism, and the Marcos–Duterte rivalry.

=== Journal articles ===
- "Middle-Power Diplomacy in the Age of Great-Power Competition: Japan, the Philippines, and the South China Sea Disputes," Journal of Indo-Pacific Affairs. Summer 2025.
- "The Philippines' Dynastic Democracy", Journal of Democracy. Volume 36, Number 3, July 2025.
- "Feuding Dynasties and Clashing Empires: The Philippines' Middle Power Moment," American Affairs. Volume IX, No. 1
- "The Return of the Marcos Dynasty," Journal of Democracy. July 2002 Issue.
- "Rodrigo Duterte and the Populist Backlash against Globalization", Harvard International Review. Vol. 38, No. 3
- "Change and continuity in the Philippine–US–China triangle" (East Asia Forum Quarterly, 'Middle power game', Vol. 12 No. 1., Australia National University)
- "Mare Liberum: Aquino, Duterte, and The Philippines' Evolving Lawfare Strategy in the South China Sea," Journal of Asian Politics & Policy, (First Quarter 2018).
- Asian fury: Rodrigo Duterte and the populist backlash against globalization, Volume, 38 Issue 2, Harvard International Review
- "The Changing Triangular Relations Between the Philippines, the United States and the People's Republic China", Journal of Asian Politics & Policy, (Fourth Quarter 2017).
- "Tragedy of small power politics: Duterte and the shifting sands of Philippine foreign policy," Journal of Asian Security, (Fourth Quarter, 2017)
- "The Arab Summer and Its Discontents: Origins of Revolution, and Islamic Movements in Post-Revolutionary Arab World", Sociology of Islam (2015, August).
- "Revenge of Geopolitics: Rise of China and the Confines of Asian Econophoria", Asian International Studies Review. (Vol 17, No. 1).

=== Books/chapters ===
- "The Postpandemic Order: China, the ASEAN, and the Future of the Indo-Pacific" in "Unfinished Transformation: Domestic Politics and International Relations Since the COVID-19 Pandemic", eds. Wonhyuk Lim (Brookings Institution, 2025)
- The Indo-Pacific: Trump, China, and the New Struggle for Global Mastery (Palgrave Macmillan, 2020)
- The Rise of Duterte: A Populist Revolt against Elite Democracy (Palgrave Macmillan, 2018)
- Asia's New Battlefield: The USA, China and the Struggle for the Western Pacific (Zedbooks/Bloomsbury, 2016)
- How Capitalism Failed the Arab World: The Economic Roots and Precarious Future of the Middle East Uprisings (Zedbooks/Bloomsbury, 2014)
- "Subaltern Populism – Dutertismo and the War on Constitutional Democracy" (Cambridge University Press, 2022)
- "At a Strategic Crossroads: ASEAN Centrality amid Sino-American Rivalry in the Indo-Pacific" (Brookings Institution, 2021)
- "Penal Populism in Emerging Markets: Human Rights and Democracy in the Age of Strongmen"(Cambridge University Press, 2020);
- "The Shifting Sands: Duterte, the Philippines, and ASEAN's Evolving Relations with the DPRK" (Routledge, 2024)
- "The Struggle for Centrality ASEAN, the South China Sea, and the Sino-American New Cold War?" (Routledge, 2022)
- "Philippines' Counter-Terror Conundrum: Marawi and Duterte's Battle Against the Islamic State" (Routledge, 2019)
- "The ascent of Asian strongmen: Emerging market populism and the revolt against liberal globalization" (Springer, 2020)
- "Genealogy of Conflict: The roots, evolution, and trajectory of the South China Sea disputes" (Routledge, 2017)
- "Philippines' Diplomatic and Security Responses in South China Sea Lawfare: Legal Perspectives and International Responses to the Philippines vs. China Arbitration Case". South China Sea Think Tank/Taiwan Center for Security Studies. Taipei. Eds. Liu, F.K. & Jonathan Spangler. (January 2016).
- "The WikiLeaks Fallout: Strategic Implications for the U.S.- ASEAN Relations", in The Wikileaks Files: What the Cables Tell us about the American Empire (Verso, 2015)
- "The US-Philippine-China Triangle: From Equi-Balancing to Counter- Balancing amid the South China Sea Disputes" in "Regional Power Shift in the Making? The Rise of China and the South China Sea Disputes" (Springer, 2015, Feb/March)

=== Monographs and long essays ===
- "The Evolution of the Chinese Navy: People's Liberation Army Navy in the Age of Great Power Competition" (Trends Research & Advisory, January 2026)
- "Twilight Zone: Japan in the Shadow of China and Trump" (German Marshall Fund, January 2025)
- "Sustaining Freedom" (Mekong Review, August 2024)
- "Fair Winds and Following Seas: Maritime Security & Hedging in the South China Sea: Philippines" (La Trobe University, August 2023)
- "Indonesia: Asia's Other Rising Major Power" (Trends Research & Advisory, February 2023)
- "China's Sharp Power" (Mekong Review, Feb 2023)
- "Stealth Superpower: The Fall and Re-Rise of Japan in the Indo-Pacific" (Trends Research & Advisory, August 2023)
- "The Rise of 'Minilateralism': The ASEAN and its Struggle for Centrality in the South China Sea (Maritime Issues, July 14, 2022)
- "Twenty-First Century Governance: The Rise of Middle Powers and the Future of Global Cooperation" (Trends Research & Advisory, October 2021).
- "Rizal's Revolutionaries" (Mekong Review, Feb 2021)
- "The Specter of Tiananmen" (Mekong Review, June 2020)
- "A Quest for Strategic Centrality: The Sino-American Rivalry and ASEAN in the Age of the Indo-Pacific" (Hudson Institute, December 2019)
- "Trouble" (Mekong Review, November 2019)
- "The ASEAN's Achilles Heel: Institutional Deficit and Leadership Vacuum Amid China's South China Sea Aggression"(Maritime Issues, August 2019)
- "Beijing's Inchoate Hegemony: The Brewing Backlash in Asia to China's Resurgence" (Carnegie Endowment for International Peace, June 2019)
- "China's premature bid for hegemony in Southeast Asia", Brookings Institution. 2018
- "Fire and Fury: Duterte's Revolutionary Foreign Policy", The Diplomat Magazine. 31, 2018
- "Southeast Asian perspectives on US–China competition: Philippines" (Council on Foreign Relations, August 2017)
- "Crossing the Rubicon: Duterte, China and Resource-Sharing in the South China Sea"(Maritime Issues, October 2018)
- "The quest for peace: the Aquino administration's peace negotiations with the MILF and CPP-NPA-NDF" (Norwegian Peacebuilding Centre, 2015)

=== Awards ===
- Ten Outstanding Young Persons in the World (TOYP)
- Ten Outstanding Young Men in the Philippines (TOYM)
- "Golden Dove" Award, Best Public Affairs Program, 29th KBP Golden Dove Awards.
- "Best Digital Newscast" in the Guild of Educators, Mentors, and Students (GEMS) Hiyas ng Sining Awards.
- "Best Current Affairs Program" nominee in 28th Asian Television Awards.
- "Gen.T Leaders of Tomorrow", Tatler Magazine, 2018
- "Gen.T Leaders of Tomorrow", Tatler Magazine, 2017
- Jardine-Oxford Scholar, University of Oxford
- "Visiting Indo-Pacific Scholar", Asia Pacific Foundation of Canada
- Asia New Zealand Foundation Visiting Expert (2024).
- Munich Security Conference Young Leader
- International Visitor Leadership Program (United Nations Convention on the Law of the Sea).
- Shangri-La Dialogue Young Leader.
- CSIS-Pacific Forum Young Leader.
- "Young Strategists", German Marshall Fund
- Taiwan Fellow, National Chengchi University
- Waseda & Erasmus Mundus-GEM PhD School
