= Nassef Manabilang Adiong =

Filipino academic

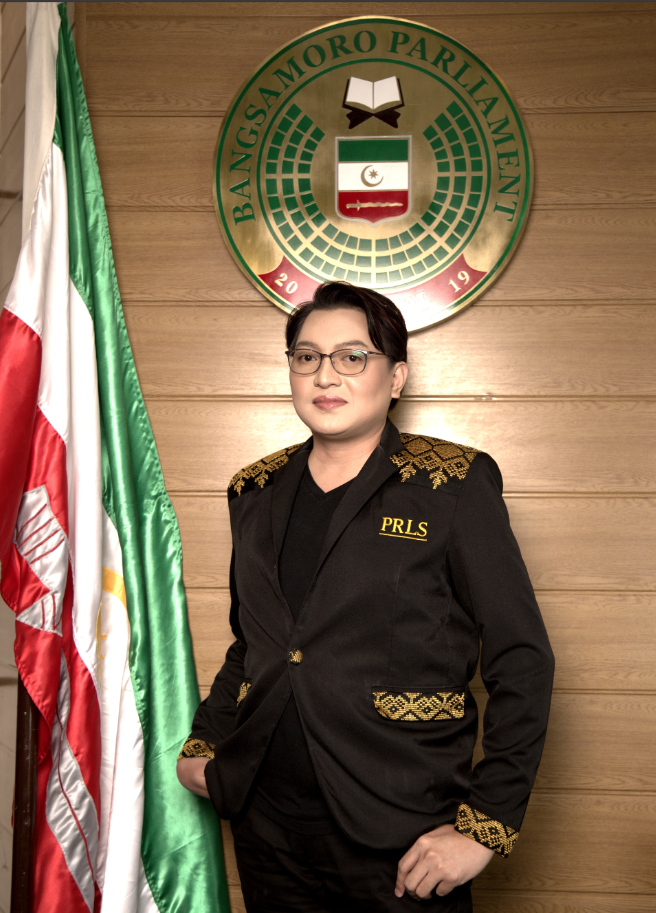
- Bangsamoro Parliament, 2023
- Born: May 7, 1985 (age 41); Iligan City, Lanao del Norte, the Philippines
- Occupations: Public policy research director, professor
- Years active: 2012 - present
- Known for: International Relations, Islamic Studies, Decoloniality, Bangsamoro Studies
- Awards: The Outstanding Young Men of the Philippines (2018), Legislative Resolution from the Bangsamoro Transition Authority (2021), A. Noam Chomsky Global Connections Award (2022)

Academic background
- Education: Trinity University of Asia (Kindergarten, Elementary School, and High School); University of the East (BA in International Studies); University of the Philippines (Master in International Studies); Middle East Technical University (PhD in International Relations)

Academic work
- Institutions: Bangsamoro Parliament University of the Philippines Asian Center
- Notable works: Interdisciplinary study between International Relations and Islamic Studies, International Studies in the Philippines, Decoloniality, Bangsamoro Studies
- Website: https://nassef.info/

Nassef Manabilang Adiong (born May 7, 1985) is a Filipino academic, researcher, policy and legislation reviewer/drafter, editor, author, consultant, advisor, founder of research networks, and wrote numerous books and articles regarding interdisciplinary study between international relations (IR) and Islamic studies, as well as topics on decolonial studies and Bangsamoro studies.

== Education ==
Dr Nassef Manabilang Adiong graduated magna cum laude in 2006 with a bachelor's degree in International Studies from the University of the East which would later award him one of its 75 Most Outstanding Alumni. He obtained his Master in International Studies degree in 2009 from the University of the Philippines Diliman where he would later teach, conferred as UP Scientist III in recognition of his dedication to scientific research under its scientific productivity system, and awarded as UP Diliman's Centennial Professorial Chair. He holds a PhD in International Relations from the Middle East Technical University.

To sustain his scholarship growth, he was a Study of the United States Institutes (SUSI) scholar on religious pluralism at Temple University and granted fellowships from Chevening at the Oxford Centre for Islamic Studies and from TÜBİTAK of the Scientific and Technological Research Council of Turkey, as well as the European Union's Erasmus Mundus Mobility with Asia Scholarship.

== Major publications ==
=== Books ===
- Cruz, FA. C., Adiong, N. M., Gamas, JH.D., Capistrano, AN.F., and Israel, L.Q. (2024). The Contemporary World. (eds.). Quezon City, Philippines: C&E Publishing.
- Cruz, FA. C. & Adiong, N. M. (2020). International Studies in the Philippines: Mapping New Frontiers in Theory and Practice. (eds.). London, UK and New York, USA: Routledge.
- Adiong, N. M., Abdelkader, D., & Mauriello, R. (2019). Islam in International Relations: Politics and Paradigms. (eds.). London, UK and New York, USA: Routledge.
- Abdelkader, D., Adiong, N. M., & Mauriello, R. (2016). Islam and International Relations: Contributions to Theory and Practice. (eds.). London, UK and New York, USA: Palgrave Macmillan.
- Adiong, N. M. (2013). International Relations and Islam: Diverse Perspectives. (ed.). Newcastle upon Tyne, UK: Cambridge Scholars Publishing.

=== Journal articles, book chapters ===
- Adiong, N. M. (2021) "The Irony of Systemic Racism in the Global South Academy: How 'Othering' Perpetuates the Western Colonisation of Knowledge." In: A. Delatolla, M. Rahman, D. Anand, et al, eds., "Challenging Institutional Racism in International Relations and Our Profession: Reflections, Experiences, and Strategies," Millennium: Journal of International Studies 50(1), pp. 122–125.
- Adiong, N. M. & Diampuan, P.D. (2021) "Principles and Practice of Moral Governance in the Bangsamoro." In: U.S. Malik, ed., Development for peace (In pursuit of sustainable peace through inclusive development: The case of the Bangsamoro). Mindanao State University–Marawi and Maven Media Asia, pp. 31–53.
- Adiong, N. M., Abdelkader, D., & Mauriello, R. (2020) "Introduction: Redefining Center and Periphery in Islam," International Journal of Islam in Asia, 1(1), Brill Publishers
- Adiong, N. M. (2020) "The Evolution of Islamic Education in the Philippines: Schools and Institutions." (A. al-Moghrabi, Translated in Arabic: تطور التعليم اإلسالمي في الفلبين... المدارس والمعاهد). In: R. Faraj, ed., The Siege of Marawi in the Philippines: The Roots of Extremism and State Fragility. Dubai, UAE: Al Mesbar Studies and Research Centre Monthly Book.
- Adiong, N. M. (2019) "Muslim Views of the Polity: Citizenry, Authority, Territoriality, and Sovereignty," Oxford Research Encyclopedia of International Studies. Oxford University Press.
- Adiong, N. M. (2019) "Salafiyyah in the Philippines," Oxford Islamic Studies Online. Oxford University Press.
- Adiong, N. M. (2016) "International Relations." The Encyclopedia of Postcolonial Studies. In: S. Ray & H. Schwarz, eds., The Wiley-Blackwell Encyclopedia of Postcolonial Studies. Hoboken, NJ: Blackwell Publishing (Blackwell Reference Online).

== Awards ==
- 2022 A. Noam Chomsky Global Connections Rising Star Emerging Scholar Award
- 2022 Armed Forces of the Philippines' Civil Relations Service's Plaque of Appreciation
- 2021 Legislative Resolution "recognizing and commending the honors and distinctions received by Dr Nassef Manabilang Adiong as an inspiration for the entire Bangsamoro young populace" adopted and approved by the Bangsamoro Transition Authority
- 2021 "UP Scientist III" conferred by the University of the Philippines
- 2021 One of the 75 Most Outstanding UE Alumni, University of the East's foundation anniversary
- 2020 University of the Philippines Diliman Centennial Professorial Chair award
- 2019 University of the Philippines' International Publication Award
- 2018 The Outstanding Young Men of the Philippines (TOYM) Award
- 2017 Conferred as Professorial Chairholder in Political Science and International Relations by the Board of Regents, Polytechnic University of the Philippines
- 2016 Plaque of Recognition from the Philippine Embassy in Ankara as the first outstanding Filipino PhD holder and mentor of Filipino scholars and students in Turkey
- 2014 Nominated by the Embassy of the Philippines in Turkey for the Republic of the Philippines' Presidential Award for Filipino Individual Overseas, also known as Pamana ng Pilipino award
- 2014 Republic of Turkey's Outstanding PhD Candidate Award
- 2011 Graduate Courses Performance Award (Most Successful PhD student in International Relations), Middle East Technical University
- 2011 Certificate of Merit as University Scholar, 2nd semester 2007-08, University of the Philippines Diliman
- 2009 Certificate of Merit as College Scholar, 2nd semester 2008-09, University of the Philippines Diliman
- 2009 Certificate of Merit as College Scholar, 1st semester 2008-09, University of the Philippines Diliman
- 2007 Academic Excellence Award, 1st to 2nd semesters 2005-06, University of the East Manila
- 2006 magna cum laude recipient (with great distinction), University of the East Manila
- 2006 Academic Excellence Award, 1st to 2nd semesters 2004-05, University of the East Manila
