= Alan Ortiz =

Filipino foreign policy and energy sector expert (1953–2020)

Alan T. Ortiz
- Born: August 23, 1953; Manila, Philippines
- Died: March 23, 2020 (aged 66); Paris, France
- Education: Ateneo de Manila University; University of the Philippines; Wharton School of the University of Pennsylvania
- Occupations: Policy expert, government official, and business executive
- Children: 4

Alan T. Ortiz, Ph.D. (August 23, 1953 – March 23, 2020) was a Filipino foreign policy and energy sector expert who was held key positions in the Philippines' government and business sectors, as well as civil society organizations such as the Bantayog ng mga Bayani.

At different points in his career, he was assistant director-general of the Philippines' National Security Council, Undersecretary to the President for the build-operate-transfer projects, president and chief operating officer of the power company SMC Global Power Holdings Corporation (SMC Power), and president of the non-profit Philippine Council for Foreign Relations.

== Education ==
Ortiz earned a bachelor's degree in economics from the Ateneo de Manila University and obtained a master's degree from the University of the Philippines. He placed first in the Philippine Foreign Service Officer examinations in 1981.

He then earned a doctorate in international relations from the University of Pennsylvania's Wharton School, writing his doctoral dissertation under the title: "The Political Economy of Ethnicity: A Case Study of Muslims in the Philippines".

== Career ==
=== Early career ===
During the late 1980s, Ortiz worked as a journalist for the Manila Chronicle, where he was considered the chronicle's resident expert on international relations.

=== Government ===
Ortiz' career in government began with various roles under the administration of President Corazon Aquino, where he eventually became assistant director-general of the National Security Council. In the administration of President Fidel Ramos, he became undersecretary to the President for the build-operate-transfer projects (later renamed public private partnership projects).

=== Government-owned corporations and the private sector ===
Concurrent to his service as undersecretary to the President for the build-operate-transfer projects, he was assigned to be vice-chairman and chief operating officer of the government-owned Development Bank of the Philippines.

After this, he held key positions in various government-owned corporations within the energy sector, including being the president of National Transmission Corporation (TransCo) from January 6, 2006 (two months before the turnover of operations, maintenance, and ownership of the Philippine power grid and its associated assets and facilities from another government-owned corporation National Power Corporation (NAPOCOR/NPC) to TransCo on March 1, 2003) until September 25, 2006. and the PNOC Energy Development Corporation.

Later entering the private sector, became an executive in the Manila Electric Company (Meralco), and became president and chief operating officer of the power company SMC Global Power Holdings Corporation (SMC Power).

Later, he became president of the non-profit Philippine Council for Foreign Relations.

=== Civil society roles ===
Ortiz also active roles in the Board of Trustees of the Philippine Science High School, and of the Bantayog ng mga Bayani, which honors the martyrs and heroes of the struggle against the 21-year dictatorship of former President Ferdinand Marcos.

== Public image ==
Ortiz was popular and well respected in government and corporate circles as well as by the media, who regularly came to him as a source of information and as a commentator on complex policy issues on the energy sector and in Philippine foreign policy.

John Forbes of the United States Chamber of Commerce in the Philippines described ortiz as "a game changer in both his public and private sector careers" and a "larger-than-life hero of our times," while Ramos administration Finance Secretary Roberto de Ocampo remarked on his reliable "ability to make things happen, and happen well."

=== Among media practitioners ===
Media practitioners have turned to Ortiz over the course of the Corazon Aquino, Ramos, Estrada, Arroyo, Benigno Aquino Jr., and Duterte administrations, either as a key as a key news source explaining the details of government policy when he was serving in the administration, or as a knowledgeable commentator on issues ranging from national security to energy stability after he had moved on to the private sector. The Philippine media particularly relied on him during his time as a senior official of the National Security Council, when his explanations of government policy were typically anonymous, and he was typically cited only as "the source." Media practitioners of the time recall that they trusted Ortiz' explanations "because he didn't have any political agenda."

== Personal life ==
Ortiz was a self-described "avid shooter, a rescue diver, a biking enthusiast, and an amateur photographer", with his August 2014 Philippine Daily Inquirer article "Why do we ride?" considered a manifesto of sorts among the Philippines' big bike enthusiast community. Ortiz was married and had four children.

== Death ==
In 2020, Ortiz accepted an invitation from the French government to attend an international security conference, traveling to Paris in early March. At the conference, both he and fellow Filipino delegate Aileen Baviera were exposed to the SARS-CoV-2 virus. Ortiz contracted the disease while in Paris and was unable to make it back to the Philippines, while Baviera showed symptoms of the disease only after returning to Manila.

Ortiz died from complications of COVID-19 on March 23, at age 66. As of May 4, 2020, he is believed to be the first Filipino to die of COVID-19 while overseas.
