= Serafin Quiason Jr. =

Filipino scholar and historian

Serafin D. Quiason Jr.

Chairman of the National Historical Commission of the Philippines
- In office 1986–1996
- Appointed by: Ferdinand Marcos; Corazon Aquino
- Preceded by: Esteban A. de Ocampo
- Succeeded by: Samuel K. Tan

Personal details
- Born: June 15, 1930 Manila, Philippines
- Died: August 13, 2016 (aged 86)
- Education: University of the Philippines
- Occupation: Public Historian

Serafin Danganan Quiason Jr. (June 15, 1930 – August 13, 2016) was a Filipino scholar and historian. He was the former director National Library of the Philippines and Chairman of the National Historical Institute in the Philippines. He is one of the 1965 TOYM (Ten Outstanding Young Men) Awardees for History.

== Early life and education ==
Quiason was born on June 15, 1930. His brother, Camilo Quiason, would eventually become Associate Justice of the Supreme Court. He married Sonia Narvas, a professor of food microbiology at the University of the Philippines and has a daughter Mita, an Information Technology Specialist.

He graduated cum laude with a degree in history at the University of the Philippines in 1952. There, he became a member of the Upsilon Sigma Phi.

Quiason was a recipient of the Fulbright-Smith–Mundt Scholarship, under which he finished his MA in Far East history and PhD in history at the University of Pennsylvania in 1954 and 1962, respectively. He was elected into the Pi Gamma Mu International Social Science Society and the Phi Alpha Theta International Historical Society.

== Career ==
From 1965 to 1970, Quiason was an associate professor of history in the Department of History of the College of Arts and Sciences in the University of the Philippines Diliman. Later on he became assistant chairman. He also became a visiting lecturer in the University of Malaysia in Kuala Lumpur in 1996.

From 1971 to 1975, he served as Secretary-General of the Southeast Asian Regional Branch of the International Council of Archives (SARBICA). He was also an elected member of the Rome-based Advisory Council of the International Center of the Study of the Conservation and Restoration of Cultural Property (ICCROM).

He is a former member of the Ad-Hoc Numismatic Committee of the Central Bank of the Philippines, the UNESCO Advisory Committee for the Study of Malay and Southeast Asian Cultures in 1978, a former Trustee of the Museo ng Malacanan Foundation from 1986 to 1990, a member of the Silk Road Expedition Across Central Asia which was sponsored by UNESCO Paris in 1990, a member of the National Centennial Commission from 1993- 1998, a former regent of the Pamantasan ng Lungsod ng Maynila from January–June 1998, a Project Director of the Museo ng Maynila in 1997-1998 and a Consultant to the Lopez Museum & Library.

He is also instrumental in the construction and completion of the Museum of Philippine History and National Historical Building at Rizal Park.

== Awards and legacy ==
Quiason was awarded the 1965 TOYM (The Outstanding Young Men of the Philippines) Award for History.

On December 30, 1984, he was given the honorary rank of Commander for the Knights of Rizal. He was conferred the Lifetime Achievement Award by University of the Philippines Alumni Association in June 2009, the Outstanding Citizen of Quezon City in November 2009, and Outstanding Lifetime Achievement Award by the University of the Philippines Alumni Association in 2015.

In 2018, the National Historical Commission Resource Center was named in his honor.

== Death ==
Quiason died on August 13, 2016, in Plainsboro, New Jersey. He was 86.

== Works ==
- The English Country Trade with the Philippines: 1644-1765, University of the Philippines Press, Quezon City, 1965
- Ang Kasaysayan ng Asya. S. D. Quiason et al. Phoenix Publishing House, Quezon City
- Ang Kasaysayan ng Daigdig. Quiason, Serafin, Bernardita Churchill, and Fe Manghas, C & E Publishing House, Quezon City, 2008
- The Japanese Colony in Davao, 1904-1941, Philippine Social Science and Humanities Review, vol. XXIII, Nos. 2–4, June–December 1958
- On Mencius' Economic Principles, The Fookien Times Yearbook, 1958
- The Sampan Trade with Manila Prior to 1702 Chinese in the Philippines, published by the Philippine Consecration Society edited by Alfonso Felix, v.1, August, 1966
- On the Values and Care of our Rare Books in the Philippines. University of Santo Tomas Library Bulletin, vol. 1, no. 2, April 1968
- The National Library in the 70s, Asian Genealogical Studies ed. By Spencer Palmer, Brigham Young University Press 1972
- The Japanese Community in Manila: 1898-1941, Philippine Historical Review, v.3. 1971 pp. 184–222
- On Some Aspects of Dr. Jose Rizal's Attitude Towards Culture, Nachrichten Der Gesellschaft Fur Naturund Volkerkunde Ostasiens, Hamburg, 117, 1975
- Some Notes on Cultural Studies in the Philippines, East Asian Cultural Studies, v. XVI, nos. 1–4, March 1977
- The Tianguia: A Preliminary View of Indigenous Rural Marketing System in the Spanish Philippines. Philippine Studies vol. 33 (1985) pp. 22–28
- The Philippines: A Case of Multiple Colonial Experience, The Independent Review, May–June 1998 pp. 29–37
