= Aileen Baviera =

Filipino sinologist (1959–2020)

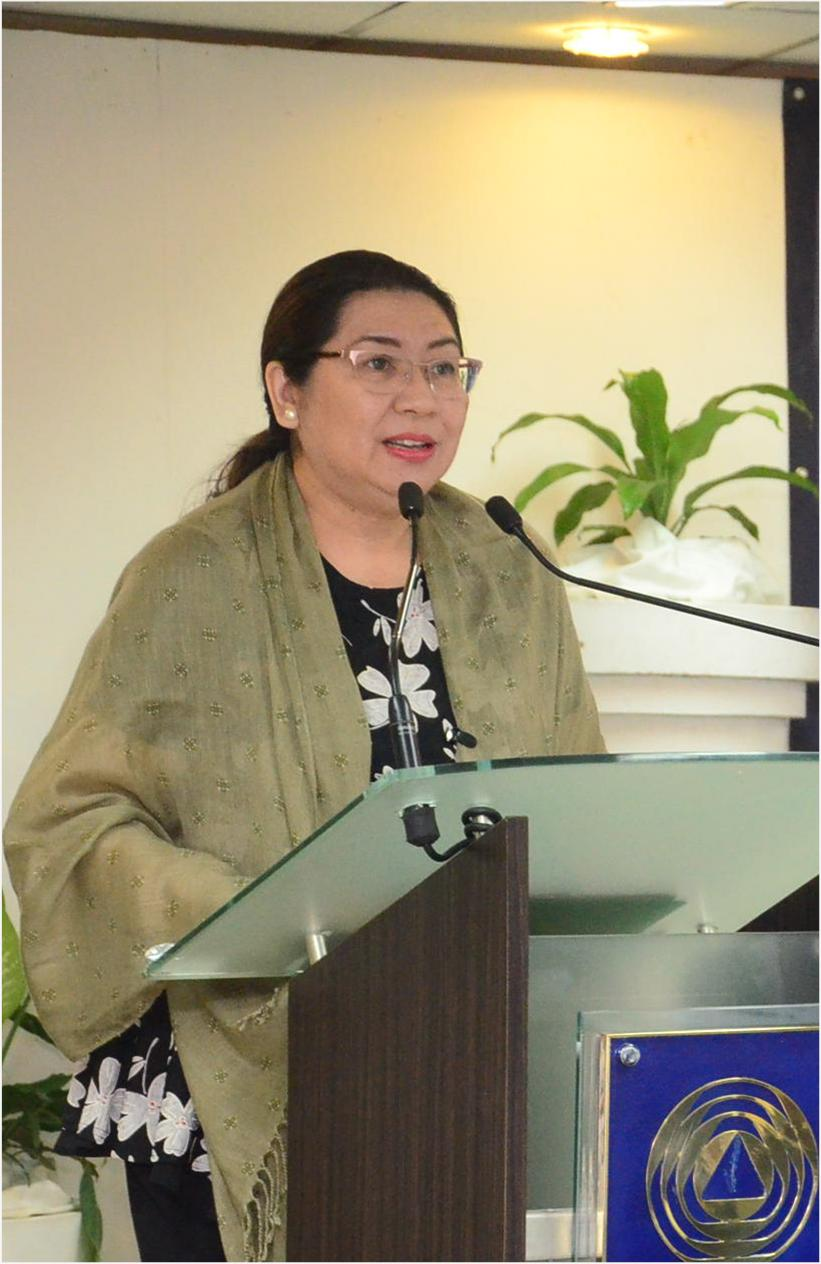
- Baviera speaks at the Maritime Security Symposium of the Development Academy of the Philippines, July 4, 2016
- Born: Aileen San Pablo; August 26, 1959; Manila, Philippines
- Died: March 21, 2020 (aged 60); Manila, Philippines
- Spouse: Jorge Villegas Baviera (d. 2018)
- Children: 3

Academic background
- Education: University of the Philippines Diliman (BS, MA, PhD)
- Scientific career
- Thesis: Post-Cold War China-ASEAN Relations: Exploring Worldview Convergence and its Security Implications (2003)

Aileen San Pablo-Baviera (August 26, 1959 – March 21, 2020) was a Filipino political scientist and sinologist. She was one of the leading China experts in her country.

== Career ==
In October 1979, Baviera received her Bachelor of Science degree in Foreign Service, cum laude at the University of the Philippines. As a student of modern Chinese history at the University of Beijing, she was allowed to do research in China for the first time from 1981 to 1983. She learned the Chinese language, received a diploma from the Beijing Language Institute and traveled to the north and west of the country. In 1987, Baviera received a Master of Arts in Asian studies, specializing in China and East Asia. The doctorate in political science followed in 2003. Before living in China, she was a leftist, but during her time there she "learned to recognize and shun the shallowness of political propaganda when I saw it, Mao's as much as Marcos's".

From 1980 to 1986, she worked as a researcher and trainer at the Foreign Service Institute of the State Department. Until 1990, she taught at the Faculty of Political Science at the University of the Philippines and then until 1993 as a research coordinator at the Philippine-China Development Resource Center. From June 1993 to May 1998, Baviera was head of the Center for International Relations and Strategic Studies of the Foreign Service Institute and taught parallel from 1996 to 1997 at the Faculty of Political Science of the Ateneo de Manila University.

From June 1998 to December 2001, Baviera was executive director of the Philippine-China Development Resource Center and at the same time until June 2005 Associate Professor at the University of the Philippines Asian Center. From September 2003 to October 2009, she was also Dean of the Asian Center. From July 2005, she was full professor and from July 2010 chief editor for Asian Politics & Policy of the Policy Studies Organization in Washington, D.C. Most recently, she was president and CEO of the Asia Pacific Pathways to Progress Foundation.

== Death ==
On the morning of March 21, 2020, Baviera died of pneumonia caused by the COVID-19 at the San Lazaro Hospital, Manila. She contracted the disease on March 12, when she returned after participating in a security conference in Paris, France. She was one of two Filipino delegates – the other being Alan T. Ortiz – who were exposed to the disease at the conference and later died from it.

She is the widow of Jorge Villegas Baviera, who died in 2018, and had three children.

== Publications (selection) ==
- Contemporary Political Attitudes and Behavior of the Chinese in Metro Manila, 1994.
- Regional Security in East Asia: Challenges to Cooperation and Community Building, 2008.
