= The Outstanding Young Men of the Philippines =

The Outstanding Young Men
- Sponsored by: TOYM Foundation; Gerry Roxas Foundation
- Country: Philippines
- Presented by: Junior Chamber International (JCI) Philippines
- Formerly called: The Outstanding Young Filipinos
- First award: 1959
- Website: jciphilippines.com/our-programs/toym/

The Outstanding Young Men award in the Philippines, formerly known as The Outstanding Young Filipinos from 1996 to 1999, is an annual national recognition awarded to Filipinos between 18 and 40 years of age who have made significant contributions to their field or community. The award is organized by the Junior Chamber International Philippines and co-sponsored by the TOYM Foundation, and the Gerry Roxas Foundation.

JCI Philippines, the chapter of the Junior Chamber International or the Jaycees in the Philippines established The Outstanding Young Men awards on October 15, 1959 during the group's 11th National Convention in Baguio. The award was earlier instituted in a smaller scale by the Manila chapter of the Philippine Jaycees on April 6, 1959. In 1984, JCI Philippines started giving women the recognition. From 1996 to 1999, the recognition was known as "The Outstanding Young Filipinos" award. The name was reverted to "The Outstanding Young Men" but women remained eligible for the award with the JCI contending that the word "men" does not "distinguish the difference in gender".

== Categories ==
The following are the categories for The Outstanding Young Men nominees as of the 2020 edition.

- Agriculture Sciences
- Arts and Humanities
- Banking Business
- Law
- Business
- Community Development
- Educational Business
- Political and Social Sciences
- Journalism and Mass Communication
- Sports
- Medicine
- Economics
- Science, Technology and Engineering

== List of winners ==
=== 1959-1960s ===
Year	Name and Category	Remarks
1959	1. Napoleon Abueva - Sculpture; 2. Benjamin Belmonte - Medicine; 3. Aurelio Estanislao - Music; 4. Jose Juliano - Science; 5. Leandro Locsin - Architecture; 6. Alejandro Roces - Journalism	
1960	1. Aquino, Benigno, Jr. - Public Service; 2. Deanon, Jose, Jr. - Science; 3. Elorde, Gabriel "Flash" - Sports; 4. Florentino, Alberto - Literature; 5. Legarda, Benito, Jr. - Economics; 6. Martin, Leonardo - Medicine; 7. Roxas, Sixto K. - Economics; 8. Santiago, Cirio - Movie Industry; 9. Soliven, Maximo - Journalism; 10. Yatco, Oscar - Music	
1961	1. Rene Elicano - Science; 2. Augusto Espiritu - Community Development; 3. Florentino Feliciano - Law; 4. Juan Maria Jose - Sports; 5. Jose Joya - Fine Arts; 6. Gilopez Kabayao - Music; 7. Rodolfo Reyes - Journalism; 8. Alfredo Roces - Humanities; 9. Francisco del Rosario - Business and Civiic; 10. Emmanuel Torres - Literature	
1962	1. Jose Abueva - Political Science; 2. Andres Cristobal Cruz - Literature; 3. Jorge Davide - Soils Science; 4. Armand Fabella - Economics; 5. Rufino Hechanova - Commerce and Industry; 6. Augusto Litonjua - Medicine; 7. Rafael Salas, Jr. - Public Administration; 8. Benjamin Tupas - Music; 9. Antonio J. Villegas - Public Service; 10. Cesar E.A. Virata - Business Administration	
1963	1. Gabrel Carreon - Medicine; 2. Jose Encarnacion - Economics; 3. Eduardo Lichuaco - Banking; 4. Jorge Lorredo, Jr. - Banking; 5. Wilfredo Nolledo - Literature; 6. Abelardo Samonte - Public Administration; 7. Mauro "Malang" Santos - Arts; 8. Bienvenido Sison - Natural Science; 9. Arturo Tanco, Jr. - Management; 10. Oscar Vlladolid - Journalism	
1964	1. Herminio Astorga - Political Leadership; 2. Pablo Campos - Medicine; 3. Luis Ma. Guerrero - Law; 4. Bienvenido Juliano - Science; 5. Arsenio Laurel - Sports; 6. Leoncio Parungao, Jr. - Community Service; 7. Rodolfo Ragodon - Arts Painting; 8. Orlando Sacay - Economics; 9. Ibarra Santos - Technology; 10. Cesar Zalamea - Business	
1965	1. Cesar Concio, Jr. - Technology; 2. Tranquilino Elcano, Jr. - Medicine; 3. Raul De Guzman - Education; 4. Felipe Jocano - Anthropology; 5. Placido Mapa, Jr. - Economics; 6. Juanito Ordoveza - Agriculture; 7. Serafin Quiason - History; 8. Jesus Tanchanco - Commercial Science; 9. Francisco Trinidad - Journalism; 10. Wenceslao Vinzons - Public Service	
1966	1. Roauro Aquino, Jr. - Nuclear Energy; 2. Antonio Arizabal, Jr. - Iron & Steel Engineering; 3. Fernardo Bernardo - Plant Breeding & Genetics; 4. Jose Enriquez - Humanitarian Service; 5. Fernando Esguerra - Geological Science; 6. Gregorio Reynaldo - Economics & Public Administration; 7. Vicente Jocson - Medicine; 8. Teodoro Nuguid - Colon & Rectal Surgery Medicine; 9. Reynald Reyes - Concert Musc; 10. Marlo Zamora - Cultural Anthropology	
1967	1. Feliciano Calora - Entomology; 2. Rene Certeza - Surveying; 3. Juan Flavier - Rural Development; 4. Ramon Ibay - Pediatric Surgery; 5. Jaime Laya - Business Education; 6. Ernesto Maceda - Gov't. & Public Service; 7. Gerardo Sicat Economics -; 8. Marcelino Tagle Humanitarian Science -; 9. Rolando Tinio Theatre Arts -; 10. Benjamin Valenton - Military Science	
1968	1968 Economics - Ayala Antonio 1968 Economics - Cruz Roman, Jr. 1968 Humanitarian Service - Elizalde Manuel 1968 Mass Media - Esquivel Benefredo 1968 Nuclear Energy - Ibarra Higino 1968 Arts & Culture - Imao Abdul 1968 Agriculture - Lantican Recardo 1968 Medicine - Laureta Higino 1968 Biochemistry - Olivera Baldomero, Jr.	
1969	1969 Medical Science - Abella Romeo 1969 International Amity - Araneta Antonio, Jr. 1969 Community Service - Fajardo Reynaldo 1969 Leadership Social & Culture - Galang Alunan 1969 Business Management - Licaros Gregorio, Jr. 1969 Rural Medicine - Macaladlad Jose 1969 Journalism - Maliwanag Vicente 1969 Agriculture Pest Control - Panganiban Domingo 1969 Farm Management - Quintos Ricardo 1969 Animal Science - Wagelie Edwin	

=== 1970s ===
Year	Name and Category	Remarks
1970	1970 Journalism - Burgos Jose, Jr. 1970 Medicine - Garcia Loreto 1970 Activism - Jopson Edgar 1970 Agricultural Science - Labadan Renato 1970 Government Service - Osmena John	
1971	1971 Social Education - Angeles Emmanuel 1971 Broadcast Journalism - Arnaldo Carlos 1971 Sculpture - Castrillo Eduardo 1971 Veterinary Medicine - Escudero Salvador 1971 Poultry Nutrition - Labadan Mario 1971 Political Science - Lapuz Jose 1971 Business Leadership - Orosa Ramon 1971 Medicine - Picache Reginaldo 1971 Management Education - Soriano Emmanuel 1971 Plant Breeding - Villareal Ruben	
1972	1972 Education - Alarcon Rogelio 1972 Youth Leadership Dev't - Alupan Alberto 1972 Business - Arellano Carlos 1972 Agriculture Extension - Bolo Inocencio 1972 Arts - Duldulao Manuel 1972 Public Administration - Estrada Joseph 1972 Human Resources Dev - Pardo Jose 1972 Veterinary Medicine - Pascual Vioquelin 1972 Economics - Villegas Bernardo 1972 Law/ Public Office - Zamora Ronaldo	
1973	1973 Agriculture - Carangal Virgilio 1973 Community - Desamito Celestino 1973 Investment Banking - Gapud Rolando 1973 Business - Ilusorio Ramon 1973 Public Administration - Leviste Antonio 1973 Animal Science - Madamba Joseph 1973 Education - Quevedo Orlado 1973 Medicine - Ramirez Alfredo 1973 Medicine - Torres Ludgerio 1973 Investment Banking - Villafuerte Luis	
1974	1974 Agriculture - Barba Ramon 1974 Arts Chan - Jose Mari 1974 Public Administration - Datumanong Simeon 1974 Education - Legaspi Rev. Fr. Leonardo 1974 Medicine - Reyes Tyronne 1974 Law - Robles Rodolfo 1974 Humanitarian Service - Tandez Arcadio, Jr. 1974 Sports - Torre Eugene 1974 Science - Uriate Filemon, Jr. 1974 Business Leadership - Venecia Jose, Jr. de	
1975	1975 Arts - Brocka Lino 1975 Entrepreneurship - Catan Gonzalo, Jr. 1975 Agriculture - Javier Emil 1975 Science - Kintanar Quintin 1975 Government Service - Mabilangan Felipe 1975 Finance - Monsod Christian 1975 National Economic Dev - Ocampo Roberto de	
1976	1976 Investment Banking - Barrios Victor 1976 Structural Engineering - Estuar Fiorello 1976 Cardiac Surgery - Figueroa Peter 1976 Natural Resources Dev't. - Garcia Antonio, Jr. 1976 Human Settlements - Garcia Ramiro, Jr. 1976 Community Service - Macawaris Mangondato 1976 Educational Management - Ordonez Victor 1976 Agriculture - Perez Cledualdo, Jr. 1976 Community Health - Ramiro Hilarion	
1977	1977 Public Administration - Benitez Jose Conrado 1977 Engineering Science - Calderon Felipe 1977 International Banking - David Reynaldo 1977 Agricultural Research - Gomez Arturo 1977 Medicine - Ludan Arturo 1977 Public Administration - Morales Horacio Jr. 1977 Law - Puno Reynato 1977 Agriculture - Quisumbing Edgardo 1977 Natural Science - Rosario del Ernesto	
1978	1978 Contemporary Music - Cayabyab Raymundo 1978 Business Entrepreneurship - Concepcion Cristino Jr. 1978 Fisheries & Aquaculture - Guerrero Rafael III 1978 Public Service in Broadcast - Mercado Orlando 1978 Sports (Bowling) - Nepomuceno Rafael 1978 Rural Development - Rey Teodoro 1978 Investment Banking - Rosario del Ramon Jr. 1978 Science in Geology - Sali Arthur 1978 Cultural Communities - Sibug Joseph 1978 Public Administration - Zosa Miguel	
1979	1979 Law Practice/Legal Aide - Agustin Leovillo 1979 Medicine - Anastacio Roberto 1979 Natural Science - Cordero Paciente Jr. 1979 Public Administration - Dizon Raymundo 1979 Business - Garcia Antonio 1979 Fine Arts - Isidro Raul 1979 Agriculture - Lozada Ernesto 1979 Medicine - Ona Enrique 1979 Youth Comm. Dev't. - Pilapil Perfecto Jr.	

=== 1980s ===
Year	Name and Category	Remarks
1980	1980 Development Banking - Bartolome Arsenio III 1980 Agriculture - Cabangbang Rodolfo 1980 International Finance - Cruz Ismael 1980 Medicine - Lagdameo Willie 1980 Rural Education - Legal Raymond 1980 Agriculture/Land Reform - Madronio Severino 1980 Arts History - Pilar Santiago 1980 Business Merchant - Samaniego Celso 1980 Management - Sandejas Jose 1980 Small & Medium Indstl Dev't - Villacorta Execquiel Jr.	
1981	1981 Research Management - Cruz dela Catalino 1981 Labor Admin Employment - Cruz dela Jonathan 1981 Agriculture - Escano Jeminiano 1981 Securities, Banking & Investment - de Guzman Michael Cesar 1981 Countryside Development - Laquijon Warlito 1981 Business Finance - Rufino Ernesto 1981 Government Service - Syjuco Jose Jr.	
1982	1982 Regional Development - Adiong Blo Umpar Ai Haj 1982 Information System - Balatbat Fernando 1982 Domestic Banking - Cuisia Jose 1982 Investment Banking - Filamor Enrique 1982 Leadership Social & Culture - Golez Jose 1982 Public Administration - Gordon Richard 1982 Countrtyside Service - Hilario Delfin 1982 Agricultural Food & Tech - Ruiz Eliseo	
1983	1983 Literature - Almario Virgilio 1983 Engineering - Lagtibay Arleo 1983 Public Administration - Laurel Jose 1983 Engineering - Magpayo Fulvio 1983 International Finance - Pangilinan Manuel 1983 Agriculture - Ricohermoso Maximo 1983 Law - Tan Eugene 1983 Human Setttlements - Valencia Rodolfo	
1984	1984 Arts - Abad Pacita 1984 Medicine - Canlas Manuel 1984 Education - Dizon Rolando 1984 Agriculture - Manalac Olimpio Jr. 1984 Agriculture - Rasco Eufemio 1984 Journalism & Literature - Salanga Alfredo	
1985	1985 Military Science - Honasan Gregorio 1985 Community Service - Lacson Daniel Jr. 1985 Management - Lazaro Delfin 1985 International Journalism - Lopez Antonio 1985 Human Rights - Nograles Prospero 1985 Science & Technology - Padolina William 1985 Media - Puno Ricardo Jr. 1985 Law - Santiago Miriam	
1986	1986 Law - Chavez Francisco 1986 Military Science - Coronel Miguel 1986 Educational Research - Gonzaga Violeta 1986 Agriculture - Halos Ponciano 1986 Media - Montelibano Maria 1986 Arts & Music - Sunico Raul 1986 Entrepreneurship - Villar Manuel Jr.	
1987	1987 Forest Conservation - Ganapin Delfin 1987 Government Service - Juico Philip Ella 1987 Medicine - Lazo Salvador 1987 Arts/Music - Licad Cecile 1987 Management Strategy - Ordonez Ernesto 1987 Management Education - Saldana Cesar 1987 Natural Resources Management - Umali Ricardo	
1988	1988 Law & Legal Aid - Asuncion Elvi John 1988 Performing Arts - Barredo Josephine Carmen 1988 Agriculture Research - Dar William 1988 Agriculture - Lantin Manuel Jr. 1988 Rehabilitation Medicine - Lim Robert 1988 Public Service - Orbos Oscar 1988 Public Service - Osmena Tomas	
1989	1989 Arts-Contemporary Music - Ayala Jose Inigo Homer 1989 Aquaculture/Agriculture - Dakay Benson 1989 Sports - Espinosa Luisito 1989 Drama & Children's Literature - Villanueva Rene	

=== 1990s ===
Year	Name and Category	Remarks
1990	1990 Entomology/Agriculture - Barrios Alberto 1990 Entrepreneurship - Caktiong Tony Tan 1990 Culinary Decorative Arts - Hermas Elmer 1990 Government Service - Robredo Jesse 1990 Theater Arts/Music - Salonga Ma. Lea Carmen	
1991	1991 Sports - Buhain Joseph Eric 1991 Business Management - Tan-Climaco Gloria 1991 Public Service - Fernando Remedios 1991 Economics - Habito Cielito 1991 Education - Leon Manuel de 1991 Government Service - Lina Jose Jr. 1991 Economics - Montes Vaughn 1991 Business Entrepreneurship - Pedro Cecilio 1991 Art & Culture Advancement - Syjuco Cesare Augusto	
1992	1992 Humanitarian Service - Barredo Michael 1992 Cinema - De Ocampo Nicolas Armada 1992 Development Banking - Delgado Guido Alfredo 1992 Culinary Arts/Buss. Entrp - Gonzales Eugenio Ramon 1992 Agricultural & Environment - Lansigan Felino 1992 Broadcast Journalism - Legarda-Leviste Loren 1992 Sports - Mercado Lydia de 1992 Medicine, Pediatric Card - Ortiz Edgardo 1992 Pharmacology - Sia Isidro 1992 Journalism - Tiglao Rigoberto	
1993	1993 Social Education - Bautista Feny delos Angeles 1993 Domestic Banking - Borlongan Teodoro 1993 Literature - Dalisay Jose Jr. 1993 Chemistry - Dayrit Fabian 1993 Environmental Law - Oposa Antonio Jr. 1993 Broadcast Journalism - Soho Jessica 1993 Journalism - Vitug Marites	
1994	1994 Contemporary Music - Aves Grace Nono 1994 Science & Technology - Bacala Angelina 1994 Business Leadership - Concepcion Jose Ma. III 1994 Pediatric Oncology & Research - Lecciones Julius 1994 Journalism - Mangahas Ma. Lourdes 1994 Medicine - Padilla Carmencita 1994 Military Science - Parcon Custodio 1994 Comm. & Dev't. Youth Affairs - Young Joy-Augustus	
1995	1995 Community Development - Dorotan Eddie 1995 Arts/Dance - Elizalde Lisa 1995 Medicine/Public Health - Pesigan Arturo 1995 Sports - Posadas Elma 1995 Cinema - Siguion-Reyna Carlos	
1996	1996 Medicine-Orthopedic Surgery - Bundoc Rafael 1996 Arts Cruz - Jovianney Emmanuel 1996 Buss. Entrepreneurship - Koa Johnlu 1996 Government Service - Paje Ramon 1996 Sports - Velasco Mansueto 1996 Geological Science - Yumul Graciano Jr.	
1997	1997 Entrepreneurship - Aldeguer Jonathan Jay 1997 Agricultural Engineering - Belonio Alexis 1997 Community Development - Cruz dela Josefina Mendoza 1997 Investment Banking - Edejer Tessa Tan 1997 Education - Lee-Chua Queena 1997 History - Ocampo Ambeth 1997 Music Composition - Toledo Josefino	
1998	1998 Secondary Education - Biyo Josette 1998 Music Ching - Jeffrey Reginald 1998 Medicine/Epidemiology - Festin Mario 1998 Communication Arts - Jimenez Menardo Jr. "Butch" 1998 Medicine - Wang Edward	
1999	1999 Business Leadership - Ayala de Jaime Augusto "Jaza" 1999 Government Service - Cabal Ligaya "Joy" 1999 Arts/Contemporary Music - Francisco Manuel Simplicio "Fr Manoling" 1999 Entrepreneurship - Hortaleza Rolando 1999 Public Service - Luz Guillermo 1999 Medicine Nuclear Cardiology - Santos-Ocampo Carlo 1999 Community Service - Paglas Datu Ibrahim III 1999 Investment Banking - Paterno Simon Manuel 1999 Banking - Tan Lorenzo	

=== 2000s ===
Year	Name and Category	Remarks
2000	2000 Music & Arts - Bolipata Alfonso "Coke" 2000 Environmental Medicine - David Maria Paz Annette 2000 Business Leadership - Gokongwei Lance 2000 Urologic Oncology - Letran Jason 2000 Environment Conservation - Ong Perry 2000 Medical Science - Ramirez Bernadette 2000 Wildlife Conservation - Salvador Dennis Joseph 2000 Rural Medicine - Sinolinding Kadil, Jr. "Jojo" 2000 Community Service - Villegas Socrates "Soc"	
2001	2001 Mass Media - Barreiro Roberto 2001 Sports/Golf - Delasin Dorothy 2001 Business Education - Go Josiah 2001 Youth Development - Gutoc Samira 2001 Peace Advocacy - Hontiveros-Baraquel Ana Theresia 2001 Sculpture - Imao Juan Sajid 2001 Business-Entrepreneurship - Liu Bernido "Bernie" 2001 Infectious Disease - Montoya Jaime 2001 Public Service in Print Media - Prieto-Romualdez Alexandra "Sandy" 2001 Plant Breeding & Genetics - Sebastian Leocadio 2001 Arts Concert Music - Valenciano Edgardo Jose Martin "Gary"	
2002	2002 Arts-Architecture - Calma Eduardo 2002 Medical Genetics - Cutiongco Eva Maria 2002 Medicine (Forensic Pathology) - Del Rosario-Fortun Raquel 2002 Music, Concert Music - Maigue Antonio "Tony" 2002 Government and Public Service - Mongoso, Jr. Florencio 2002 International Broadcast Journalism - Ressa Maria Angelita 2002 Plant Breeding/Genetics/Molecular Bio - Romero Gabriel 2002 Human Rights / Legal Aid - Theodore Te 2002 Fashion Design - Totengco Rafe 2002 Entrepreneurship in Exports - Villafuerte, Jr. Luis Raymund "L-Ray"	
2003	2003 Psychology & Education - Bernardo Allan Benedict 2003 Entrepreneurship - Bernardo, III Franciso Enrique "Jay" 2003 Agriculture (Animal Breeding/Genetics) - Bondoc Orville 2003 Arts-Design/Entrepreneurship - Cobonpue Kenneth 2003 Literature - Gatmaitan Luis 2003 Tourism Management - Gregorio Patrick "Pato" 2003 Literature - Nadera, Jr. Victor Emmanuel "Vim" 2003 Community Service - Ong John B. 2003 Vascular Surgery - Quintos II Ricardo Jose 2003 Agricultural & Food Technology - Tan Lyndon Co	
2004	2004 Government/Public Service - Bonoan Emmanuel 2004 Medicine - Del Rosario Jose Jonas 2004 Broadcast Management - Flores Marissa 2004 Plant Breeding and Genetics - Gregorio Glenn 2004 Urologic Surgery - Lapitan Maria Carmela 2004 Art and Culture - Lico Gerard Rey 2004 Environmental Law - Luna Maria Paz 2004 Sports - Pacquiao Emmanuel "Manny" 2004 Arts/Movie - Pangilinan Sharon Cuneta 2004 Business - Tantoco Bienvenido "Donnie"	
2005	2005 Arts & Entertainment - Bunagan Beethoven "Michael V" 2005 Aquaculture - Cruz Paul Felipe 2005 Social Entrep/Community Service - Diaz Illac Angelo 2005 Government Service - Escudero Francis "Chiz" 2005 Community Development - Herbosa Edgardo 2005 Medicine - Marcelo Alvin Valeriano 2005 Science & Technology - Ungria De Maria Corazon	
2006	2006 Arts/Sculpture - Cacnio Michael Allen 2006 Medicine/Child Protection - Castillo Mariella 2006 Medicine/Community Service - Consunji Rafael Isidro Gerardo 2006 Sports - Garduce Romeo 2006 Business Entrepreneurship - Hernandez Louie Benedict 2006 Journalism - Hizon Federico "Rico" 2006 Sports - Oracion Heradio 2006 Government Service - Quimbo Romero 2006 Medical Science (Microbiology) - Rivera Windell 2006 Community Service - Sanchez Eugenio Isabelo Tomas "Bo" 2006 Education - Soliven Samuel 2006 Education/Business Entrepreneurship - Tan Vivienne	
2007	2007 Broadcast Journalism - David Kara Patria 2007 Government/Public Service - Ejercito Joseph Victor "JV" 2007 Military Service - Espino Giemel 2007 Disaster Management - Golez Anthony Rolando 2007 Business Leadership - Mendiola Dennis 2007 Religious Service - Suarez Fr. Fernando 2007 Community Service - Tiangco Tobias Reynald	
2008	2008 Science & Technology - Alfonso Antonio 2008 Community Service - Bernardo Rex 2008 Agricultural Science - Cumagun Christian Joseph 2008 Broadcast Journalism - Davila Kristin Karen 2008 Ecotourism - Durano Joseph Felix Mari "Ace"	
2009	1. Maria Victoria Morales-Reyno (Broadcast Journalism); 2. Mary Joy Canon-Abaquin (Education); 3. Jose Roberto Alday Alampay (Democracy and Human Rights Advocacy); 4. Ma. Anthonette Velasco-Allones (Human Resource Development); 5. Raymund Joseph Teves Laurel (Arts-Fashion Design); 6. Eliseo Lucero-Prisno III (Maritime Health).	

=== 2010s ===
Year	Name and Category	Remarks
2010	1. Alan Peter Cayetano - Government and Public Service; 2. Sonny Angara - Government Service; 3. Efren Peñaflorida - Grassroots Education and Community Service; 4. Bam Aquino - Social Enterprise and Community Development; 5. Harvey Keh - Public Education and Good Governance; 6. Therese "Gang" Badoy - Alternative education and youth leadership 7. Maria Rachelle Gerodias - Arts and music (classical); 8. Edsel Salvana - Medicine and social activism 9. Beatrice Valdes - Fashion design and entrepreneurship 10. Jun Yupitun - Entrepreneurship in pioneer studies.	
2011	1. Maria Antonia Arroyo; 2. Raul Destura; 3. Sherwin Gatchalian; 4. Salvador Leachon; 5. Gerard Salonga; 6. Edgar Sia II; 7. Antonio Tiu	
2012	1. Emmeline Aglipay - Public service 2. Warren Baticados - Veterinary medicine 3. Emelio "Chieffy" Caligdong - Sports; 4. Abelardo Apollo David - Community occupational rehabilitation 5. Ivan Anthony Henares - Heritage conservation 6. Rodrigo "Jiggy" Manicad Jr. - Broadcast journalism 7. and Allan "apl.d.ap" Pineda - Contemporary music	
2013	1. Emerson Atanacio - Social Entrepreneurship; 2. Custer Deocaris - Science Communications; 3. Miguel Rene Dominguez - Government & Public Service; 4. June Cheryl Cabal-Revilla - Community Service; 5. Alonzo Gabriel - Food Science & Technology; 6. Karl Michael Reyes - Medicine; 7. Paolo Antonio S. Silva - Medicine; 8. Chris Tiu - Youth Leadership Development; 9. Nicole Curato - Sociology	
2014	1. Marlyn Alonte-Naguiat - Government and public service 2. Vincent Franco Frasco - Public administration 3. Jessie Pascual Bitog - Agricultural engineering 4. Maria Doris Dumlao - Journalism; 5. Oscar Franklin Tan - Law; 6. John Mark Velasco - Medical science and public health	
2015	1. Raymond Abrea - Accounting and finance 2. Jose Ramon Aliling - Civil engineering 3. Michael Barney Almazar - Law/legal aid 4. Geoffrey Brian Chua - Education; 5. Patricia Evangelista - Journalism; 6. Sofronio Fortich Jr - Arts in music 7. Donald Patrick Lim - Community development 8. Nico Jose Nolledo - Business; 9. Roderick Salenga - Public health 10. Rogelio Santos Jr - Social entrepreneurship	
2016	1. Carmela Andal-Castro - Law; 2. Clarisse Delgado - Education; 3. Ryan Guinaran - Indigenous people advocacy 4. Randy Halasan - Education; 5. Richard Heydarian - Social science 6. Richard Muallil - Marine science 7. Ronivin Pagtakhan - Youth leadership 8. Geraldine Racaza - Medicine; 9. Saturnino Tiamson - Arts in music 10. Jhett Tolentino - Arts in theatre 11. Earl Martin Valencia - Entrepreneurship	
2017	1. Hidilyn F. Diaz - Sports; 2. Byron F. Allatog - Government service/law enforcement 3. Cirilo Joseph M. Javier - Arts in music 4. Eugenio P. Mende - Veterinary medicine 5. Ronaldo C. Reyes - Education; 6. Datu Jason Roy T. Sibug - Community development 7. Mark Anthony J. Torres - Government service education 8. Chiara Anne G. Zambrano - Journalism and mass communication.	
2018	1. Dr. Nassef Manabilang Adiong - International Relations; 2. Jamela Aisha Martinez Alindogan - International Journalism; 3. Cherrie De Erit Atilano - AgriBusiness; 4. Karl Chua - Economic Development; 5. Bernard Faustino La Madrid Dy - Public Service; 6. Rodne Rodiño Galicha - Environment Conservation & Climate Change Education; 7. Fatima Peñones Ibias-Lanuza - Government Service/Law Enforcement; 8. Dr. Erika Fille Tupas Legara - Education Innovation; 9. Dr. Katerina Tolentino Leyritana - Public Health; 10. Dr. Mark Anthony Santiago Sandoval - Medicine/Endocrinology; 11. Jaton Zulueta Jr. - Community Development	
2019	1. Reynaldo S. Abellana - Arts and Humanities (Music); 2. Ziaur-Rahman Adiong - Government service 3. Atom Araullo - Broadcast journalism 4. Casiano H. Choresca Jr. - Fisheries and agriculture 5. Dino Carlo Chua - Business-tourism; 6. Glenn F. Fernandez - Youth participation in disaster risk reduction 7. Gerardo G. Francisco, Jr. - Arts and Humanities (Dance); 8. Marc Paul J. Lopez - Medicine, colon, and rectal surgery 9. Aisa A. Mejino - Science and green technology 10. Alfred Vargas - Public service	

=== 2020s ===
Year	Name and Category	Remarks
2020	1. David Almirol Jr. - Science, technology, and engineering 2. Edgar Elago - Community development and education 3. George Royeca - Business entrepreneurship in pioneering industries 4. Lesley Jeanne Cordero - Political and social sciences 5. Raymond Francis Sarmiento - Medicine; 6. Army Capt. Ron Villarosa Jr. - Community development and military service 7. Victor Ma. Regis N. Sotto - Government service	
2021	1. Ariestelo A. Asilo - Social Entrepreneurship; 2. Iloisa Romaraog-Diga - Agricultural Entrepreneurship; 3. Eleazar Abraham "Abe" L. Orobia - Education and Culture; 4. Anna R. Oposa - Environment and Marine Conservation; 5. Dr. Jayeel S. Cornelio - Education and Sociology; 6. Maria Yzabell Angel V. Palma - Science and Technology; 7. Jaime Alfonso M. Aherrera - Medicine-Cardiology; 8. Kou Sabrina S. Ongkiko - Education and the Academe; 9. Jaemark S. Tordecilla - Digital Journalism; 10. Melvin J. Sanicas - Science and Medicine.	
2022	1. Dr. Gideon Lasco - Education and the Academe; 2. Manix Abrera - Literature, Culture and the Arts; 3. Dr. Beverly Lorraine Ho - Health and Medicine; 4. Dr. Ramon Lorenzo Luis Guinto - Health and Medicine; 5. Dr. Ronnie Baticulon - Health and Medicine; 6. Dr. Rico Ancog - Education and the Academe; 7. Victor Mari Baguilat Jr. - Literature, Culture and the Arts; 8. Kristian Cordero - Literature, Culture and the Arts; 9. Shawntel Nicole Nieto - Humanitarian, Civil Society or Voluntary Leadership; 10. Joanne Ascencion Valdez - Humanitarian, Civil Society or Voluntary Leadership	
2023	1. Ma. Regaele Olarte - education leadership 2. EJ Obiena, Global Excellence in Sports; 3. Kenneth Isalah Abante, Socio-Civic and Voluntary Leadership; 4. Ruel Amparo, Agri-Entrepreneurship; 5. Khrista Francis Desesto, OFW Empowerment Advocate; 6. Mark Gersava, Agri-Entrepreneurship; 7. Dr. Jan Carlo B. Punongbayan, Economics; 8. John Mark Napao, Sustainable Energy; 9. Tor Sagud, Heritage Promotion; 10. Stephen Michael Co, Food Technology Innovation and Entrepreneurship.	
2024	1. Jenica Beatriz Dizon-Mountford, Humanitarian Service and Social Work; 2. Zig Dulay, Arts and Culture (TV/Film); 3. Billie Crystal Dumaliang, Environmental Leadership and Community Development; 4. Roscinto Ian Lumbres, Forestry, Agriculture and Other Applied Sciences; 5. Venazir Martinez, Arts and Culture; 6. Jose Gabriel Mejia, Arts and Culture; 7. Pia Ranada, Journalism and Mass Communication; 8. Dennis Umali, Veterinary Medicine; 9. Brent Andrew Viray, Rural Medicine and Surgery; 10. Pia Wurtzbach, Humanitarian Service and Social Work	
2025	1. John Jamir Benzon R. Aruta, environmental and climate psychology 2. Raymond Marvic (Ice) C. Baguilat, Law, Human Rights and Indigenous Peoples; 3. Rafael Sison Dionisio, Regenerative Tourism and Circular Economy Entrepreneurship; 4. Deo Florence L. Onda, Environment and Marine Conservation	
