= National Grid Corporation of the Philippines =

Private utility company in the Philippines

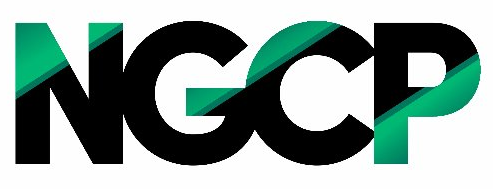

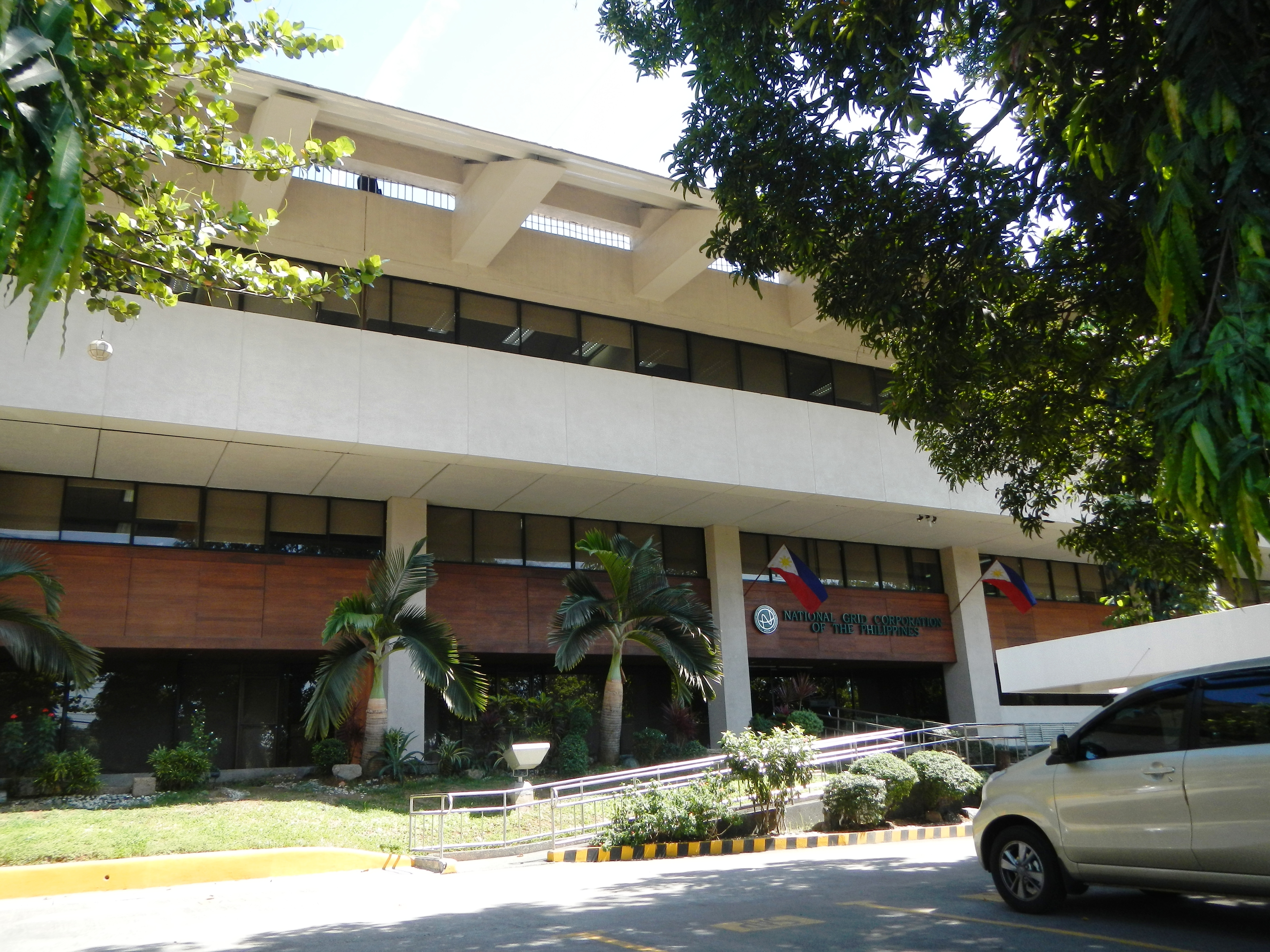
- Main corporate headquarters of NGCP
- Type: Private company
- Industry: Electric utility
- Founded: January 15, 2009; 17 years ago
- Headquarters: Power Center, Quezon Avenue corner Senator Miriam P. Defensor-Santiago Avenue (BIR Road), Diliman, Quezon City 1100, Metro Manila, Philippines (main); Bonaventure Plaza, Ortigas Avenue, San Juan, Metro Manila, Philippines (alternate/secondary)
- Key people: Zhu Guangchao (Chairman); Henry T. Sy Jr. and Robert Coyiuto Jr. (Vice-Chairmen); Anthony Almeda (President)
- Website: www.ngcp.ph

The National Grid Corporation of the Philippines (NGCP) is a privately owned corporation that was established on January 15, 2009, through RA 9511. It is a consortium of three corporations, namely Monte Oro Grid Resources Corporation, Calaca High Power Corporation, and the State Grid Corporation of China.

As the franchise holder and transmission service provider, it is in charge of operating, maintaining, and developing the country's power grid and its related assets and facilities, controls the supply and demand of power by determining the power mix through the selection of power plants to put online (i.e., to signal power plants to produce power, as power plants will only produce power or feed their power to the transmission grid when directed by NGCP), updates the daily power situation outlook for Luzon, Visayas, and Mindanao power grids (which can be seen on its Facebook page as well as on the business section of newspapers since March 2011 such as The Philippine Star, Philippine Daily Inquirer, and Manila Bulletin) by determining the available generating capacity, system peak demand, and operating margin (with operating margin is determined by subtracting the available generating capacity and system peak demand, and all of which are in units of MW or megawatts), and the temporary owner of grid portions and components having acquisition and designation made including those that are under its own plan of transmission projects turned over from the National Transmission Corporation (TransCo) to NGCP and not from the former's original version of the project since its establishment at the said date of January 2009.

As a common carrier, it must provide non-discriminatory access to its transmission system. It is subject to the standards set by the Philippine Grid Code and the Transmission Development Plan.

== History ==
=== 2001–2009: Power grid operations, maintenance, and expansion under Philippine government (NAPOCOR/NPC and TransCo) ===
On June 8, 2001, President Gloria Macapagal Arroyo signed RA 9136 (Electric Power Industry Reform Act), which introduced market competition in the energy sector and mandated the creation of National Transmission Corporation (TransCo) 18 days after the law was approved on June 26, 2001, originally as a child agency of another government-owned corporation National Power Corporation (NAPOCOR/NPC), with the latter operated, maintained and owned the country's power grid during that time therefore continuing to use its name as owner, before the transfer of the grid to the former on March 1, 2003, where TransCo then operated, maintained, constructed, expanded, and made eminent domain to the grid from March 2003 to January 15, 2009, independent from NAPOCOR/NPC.

On December 12, 2007, two consortia bid for a 25-year license to run the Philippine power grid - privatization of the management of TransCo. The consortium of Monte Oro Grid Resources Corp., led by businessman Enrique Razon, comprising the State Grid Corporation of China, and Calaca High Power Corp., won in an auction conducted by the Power Sector Assets and Liabilities Management (PSALM) Corp. as it submitted the highest offer of $3.95 billion, for the right to operate TransCo for 25 years, outbidding San Miguel Energy, a unit of San Miguel Corporation (bid of $3.905 billion), Dutch firm TPG Aurora BV, and Malaysia's TNB Prai Sdn Bhd. Jose Ibazeta, PSALM president and CEO remarked: “We are very happy about the successful turnout of the bidding for TransCo. PSALM handled the privatization of the government’s transmission business with utmost transparency and judiciousness." This initiated the privatization process for the transmission sector.

On February 21, 2008, NGCP was registered with the Securities and Exchange Commission (SEC).

On February 28, 2008, its concession agreement with TransCo was executed and became effective. The agreement between NGCP and TransCo was signed by TransCo president Arthur Aguilar, PSALM president Jose Ibazeta, and NGCP directors Walter Brown, Elmer Pedregosa and Du Zhigang.

Congress approved bicameral resolution granting franchise to NGCP to manage and operate its transmission facilities nationwide in November 2008.

On December 1, 2008, Gloria Macapagal Arroyo signed the RA 9511 which gives it the franchise to operate, maintain, and expand the transmission facilities of TransCo.

On January 15, 2009, NGCP took over the operations, maintenance, management, expansion, construction, and eminent domain of the national transmission system from TransCo which officially started the former to operate, maintain, manage, expand, construct, and acquire and designate lands for the transmission structures or components and rights-of-way (ROWs) for the power lines or their particular segments, with Walter A. Brown as the company's first president. This grants NGCP temporary ownership on anything it acquires and designated from the said date of January 2009, with TransCo retaining ownership for those before the date of turnover.

=== 2009–present: Power grid operations, maintenance, and expansion under private sector ===
As a result of the privatization of operations, maintenance, management, expansion, construction, and eminent domain of the country's power grid upon their turnover from TransCo to NGCP on January 15, 2009, NGCP revised and made its own plans for the unfinished parts of Projects Under Construction (PUC) that former power grid operator TransCo had not yet acquired and designated, with components and portions under it are under NGCP ownership temporarily, while those that are within the original plan remain with TransCo in accordance with the concession agreement between parties, creating temporary dual ownership over the grid where TransCo retains the pre-privatization while NGCP during its operational period.

On March 26, 2010, Roque Corpuz was appointed as the company's second president, replacing Walter A. Brown. Three months later on June 20 of that same year, Henry Sy Jr. became the third NGCP president.

On August 23, 2010, Department of Energy (DOE) issued Department Order DO2010-08-0015 creating a Technical Working Group to audit NGCP system operations.

In March 2011, the daily power situation outlook for Luzon, Visayas, and Mindanao power grids started to be printed on business section of newspapers such as The Philippine Star, Philippine Daily Inquirer, and Manila Bulletin.

DOE issued its first Transmission Development Plan as power grid operator which is the 2009 TDP that would provide a guide for NGCP in improving the reliability of the electricity backbone on April 22, 2016. 2009 TDP contains some information made by TransCo, NGCP's predecessor in power grid operations and maintenance, such as the project components that were originally planned to be made on a particular transmission project before some or all components were changed, and revisions were made on a project when NGCP is now the power grid operator.

In May 2017, TransCo accused NGCP with violating its concession agreement with the power grid operator by supposedly making too much money from its operations of the country's electricity grid. Executive Secretary Salvador Medialdea pointed out that, if indeed NGCP had violated the terms of its contract by profiting unduly from the operations of the power grid (e.g. allowing telecommunications firms to mount their fiber optic cables on the transmission towers) that the proper remedy would be for the government to dun NGCP for its share of the profits.

On March 7, 2018, Henry Sy Jr. resigned as president and CEO, with Chief Administrative Officer Anthony Almeda named as the company's new president.

On June 8, 2018, the Department of Information and Communications Technology (DICT), NGCP, and TransCo signed an agreement on Friday for a national broadband plan that will help accelerate internet connectivity nationwide. Under the agreement, the DICT will utilize TransCo's reserved optical fiber to distribute connectivity from Luzon to Mindanao using the submarine cables that will be laid down by Facebook from the United States to Asia. The agreement plans to expand the internet connectivity in public places for free by building an additional 200,000 access points nationwide by 2022, DICT Officer-In-Charge Eliseo Rio said.

On December 4, 2019, the Senate probed the delayed projects by NGCP as well as the already deferred initial public offering. On the same month, it was revealed by senator Risa Hontiveros that NGCP allowed suspicious Chinese nationals to “exercise leadership and management roles” within NGCP ranks and that 43 contracts were handed to Chinese firms under Duterte. She also raised alarm after discovering that under Duterte, the NGCP has become 40-percent owned by the State Grid Corporation of China.

In January 2025, the Maharlika Investment Corporation bought an 20% stake in the company for $350 million, which gave them two seats at the board of the NGCP as well as the Synergy Grid and Development Philippines Inc.

== Notable projects ==
=== 2009–present: Projects relating to Hermosa-Duhat-Balintawak transmission line ===
Due to the turnover of power grid operations, maintenance, expansion, and eminent domain from National Transmission Corporation (TransCo) to NGCP on January 15, 2009, only four lands and structures, and two ROWs for the lattice towers were acquired and designated, and under the original TransCo plan and component of the relocation project that are currently in use (towers 255, 256, 266, and 267 (with the last two are using National Power Corporation (NAPOCOR/NPC)-era and original TransCo designation towers 264 and 265)) as stated on the fieldwork report of Hermosa-Balintawak Transmission Line Relocation as part of their permission granted from NLEX Corporation, and San Simon, Apalit, Calumpit, and Pulilan local government units (LGUs) to run parallel with San Simon-Pulilan section of North Luzon Expressway (NLEX). As a result, NGCP continued the project by acquiring and designating lands and 3 ROWs for the 58 steel poles (poles 228–254, 257–265, 268–289, with some of them are NAPOCOR/NPC-era poles or secondhand where they should be supposedly be retired and not used within the project under its original TransCo plan), under NGCP's revised plan and component of the project, and on locations and alignment or route different from the original TransCo plan of the relocation project from November 2009 until the completion of the relocated line segment in September 2011 when the reference numbers and Danger with ownership information signs were placed on the structures, after the transmission project was delayed many times due to the repair of damaged facilities on Bicol Region resulting from 2006 typhoons, the turnover from TransCo to NGCP in January 2009, and typhoons Ondoy and Pepeng which flooded the Apalit, Calumpit and Pulilan rice paddies, and Candaba Swamp on where the right-of-way (ROW) of a viaduct section of the relocation project passes through, still with the permission from NLEX Corporation and the said LGUs to continue the project.

In July 2010, NGCP constructed 3 new and higher steel poles (381–383) due to the construction of Plaridel Bypass Road.

NGCP continued the relocation of the transmission line's San Fernando section that started in 2001 under National Power Corporation (NAPOCOR/NPC) in February 2011 with steel pole 167 at the side of Jose Abad Santos Avenue (JASA) using NAPOCOR/NPC-era pole 275 that was originally located along MacArthur Highway in Calumpit, Bulacan to alleviate heavy traffic along the avenue due to the presence of its electric poles standing on the highway itself, and to pave the way for the expansion of some segments of the avenue particularly at Barangay Dolores with it also marked the removal of steel poles and lattice towers of original alignment of San Simon-Pulilan section of the transmission line along MacArthur Highway and Pulilan Regional Road, following the already original completed purpose of relocating poles within the lahar radius of Mount Pinatubo from 2001 to 2003. Along the poles of the relocation project, four of them were placed at the southbound side of avenue before North Luzon Expressway (NLEX) San Fernando Exit due to Laus Group of Companies Chairman Levy Laus opposed to place the steel poles within the property of his automotive business as they carry 230,000 volts of electricity and their relocation closer to their business offices and residences will pose a threat to the health and safety of employees, customers, visitors and others who stay around the area on a daily basis. The relocated transmission line segment along NLEX was completed on March 25, 2011, and the Hermosa-Balintawak Transmission Line Relocation project overall in September 2011. Relocation of San Fernando section of the line, however, was delayed many times due to ROW issues. With the construction of poles between current pole 167 and Mexico–Hermosa Transmission Line, they are now the highest to be used on the line since then, beating the asymmetrical steel pole 515A stated on next paragraphs.

Several structures were painted starting with lattice towers from early 2010s to 2021, then followed by steel poles in 2015 (including those acquired, designated and built by, and belonging to a plan and component of NGCP and its predecessor TransCo) with aluminum paint to protect them from corrosion and extend their service lifespan.

From 2016 to 2020, pole 515A was added by NGCP between 515 and the line's terminus through a connection to a portal tower in Balintawak Substation for the intersection of San Jose-Balintawak line 3 and Hermosa-Duhat-Balintawak transmission lines with the said pole also serves as pole 1 of the former.

The removed NAPOCOR/NPC-era steel poles by NGCP due to various projects done on the transmission line that were not used on the line itself were either stored on its various substations or used on other power lines, such as the Hermosa-Malolos-San Jose, Mexico-Hermosa, Hermosa-Limay, and Currimao-Laoag transmission lines.

=== 2011–2024: Mindanao-Visayas Interconnection ===
In January 2024, the Mindanao-Visayas Interconnection Project (MVIP) completed and became fully operational which finally uniting the Philippine power grid. It was made on a simultaneous ceremonial switch-on in Manila, Cebu, and Lanao del Norte. President Bongbong Marcos led the ceremony in Malacañang Palace. “After a much-extended wait, I am pleased to finally see the energization of the 450-megawatt MVIP. It is the first time in the history of our nation that the three major power grids, those of: Luzon, Visayas, and Mindanao—are now physically connected,” said Marcos in his speech. Among the components of the project is the 184 km submarine cable connecting the Mindanao and Visayas grids.

According to the NGCP, efforts to establish this connection began in the 1980s when the government-owned National Power Corporation (NAPOCOR/NPC) still operated, maintained, owned, and expanded the grid but were abandoned due to difficulties. Efforts to revive the connection began in 2011 when the NGCP began studying its viability.

“The MVIP, which unites the Luzon, Visayas, and Mindanao grids, is identified as integral to economic development through the delivery of stable power transmission services and enabling of energy resource sharing,” said the MVIP.

=== 2012–present: Projects relating to Sucat-Paco-Araneta-Balintawak transmission line ===
Two new steel poles were added between poles 143 and 144 of the Sucat–Araneta segment of the line for its cut-in connection to Meralco Paco Substation in 2012. This cut-in connection to the said substation also made the transmission line from being a two-part to three-part power line.

Due to the construction of Skyway Stage 3, several steel poles were replaced and relocated or added newer poles between the existing structures. The newer steel poles were made of porcelain discs (15) and 3 horizontal pole-mounted porcelain insulator. Since the construction of Skyway Stage 3, the newer design is flag design with the deadend insulators (made of polymer/porcelain).

Several structures were painted (including those acquired, designated and built by, and belonging to a plan and component of NGCP) with aluminum paint to protect them from corrosion and extend their service lifespan.

=== 2018–present: Expansion of the Philippine 500kV transmission network ===
In 2018, NGCP started building 500kV lattice towers of Balsik-Marilao-San Jose segment of Balsik-Marilao-San Jose-Tayabas-Pagbilao and Castillejos-Hermosa 500kV transmission lines, marking the construction of 500kV lines not seen since the completion of Kadampat-San Manuel-San Jose line in 1999 when the government-owned National Power Corporation (NAPOCOR/NPC) still owned, operated, maintained, and expanded the Philippine power grid and its related assets and facilities. It then followed by the construction of Mariveles-Hermosa transmission line in 2019.

On March 30, 2022, NGCP energized the Mariveles-Hermosa transmission line after three years of construction, consisting of 136 lattice towers, that expands the existing capacity of the transmission facilities to accommodate more than 2,500MW of incoming generation from the Bataan Peninsula, including the GN Power Dinginin (GNPD) coal-fired power plant and the Mariveles Power Generation Corporation (MPGC). It is the first 500kV transmission line in the Philippines to have NGCP's own taller variant of the tower within the line, as well as the first to be completed under NGCP and after the privatization of the Philippine power grid operations, maintenance, and expansion on January 15, 2009. The line's completion and energization also marked the resumption of completing and energizing 500kV lines after 23 years since the Kadampat-San Manuel-San Jose line in 1999.

On May 27, 2023, NGCP partially energized the Balsik-Marilao-San Jose segment of Balsik-Marilao-San Jose-Tayabas-Pagbilao 500kV transmission line that would strengthen transmission services and accommodate new bulk power generation from the Bataan area. It spans the provinces of Bulacan, Pampanga, and Bataan. However, there are right-of-way issues which delayed the full completion of the project as the July 2023 TRO was lifted through SC Resolution dated February 28, 2024, promulgated on April 8, 2024. The restraining order stopped for 9 months construction along Towers 170-178 of the line's Marilao-Hermosa segment, affected by the expropriation case of Century Properties' PHirst Park Homes. “This will enable us to complete the remaining portion of the HSJ,” the NGCP announced in May 2024.

NGCP fully completed the Balsik-Marilao-San Jose segment of the four-part Balsik-Marilao-San Jose-Tayabas-Pagbilao 500kV transmission line after six years of construction on June 23, 2024, making the said power line segment now at full 8,000MW capacity as well as expanding the 500kV backbone from Central to Southern Luzon. The transmission line segment, along with the Mariveles-Hermosa line that was earlier completed and energized in March 2022 during the administration of President Rodrigo Duterte, were both inaugurated on July 12, 2024, by Duterte's successor Bongbong Marcos. With the completion of the said power line segment, the Balsik-Marilao-San Jose-Tayabas-Pagbilao line is now the longest 500kV power line in the country at 552.4 km in length, surpassing the Kadampat-San Manuel-San Jose line (commissioned in March 1999) at 225 km.

=== Cebu-Negros-Panay Backbone project ===
On April 8, 2024, Marcos Jr. inaugurated the 230 kV Cebu-Negros-Panay Backbone project with its simultaneous ceremonial energization at the NGCP Bacolod Substation in Negros Occidental. The Cebu-Negros-Panay Backbone, which includes the Negros-Panay Interconnection Project Line 2, was built in three stages, the last completed on March 27, 2024. It complements the Amlan-Samboan submarine cable, which is connects Cebu and Negros islands. CNP Project Stage 1 added a new 230kV transmission line from Bacolod to Enrique B. Magalona, Negros Occidental, while Stage 2 upgraded the Cebu Substation into 230kV level.

=== 2021–present: Cebu-Bohol Interconnection project ===
On 2022, the Energy Regulatory Commission (ERC) cleared the proposed 230kV Cebu-Bohol Interconnection Project of the NGCP. The ERC also approved Option 1 among the two options of NGCP's proposed Cebu-Bohol Interconnection project in a 47-page decision. The approved option involves an outright double circuit 230kV submarine cable with a 600 MW capacity with a provision of a third circuit between Cebu, a 230kV overhead transmission line, and a 230kV switchyard in the existing Corella substation, and it will have an estimated cost of ₱19.61 billion.

The Cebu-Bohol Interconnection project is aimed to help prevent overloading of the present 138kV Leyte-Bohol submarine cable which only having a capacity of 90 MW. The groundbreaking of the project began on December 9, 2021. Currently, works on the Cebu-Bohol Interconnection project is still ongoing. The layout of the submarine cable, that will link Argao and Maribojoc, stands out nearly 100 percent completed, with NGCP currently finalizing the road wayleave acquisition and the expropriation proceedings of the project, and out of the 74 overhead transmission (OHT) towers that will span the remaining 18 kilometers to the Corella SS, 28 have been already constructed.

Completion of the Cebu-Bohol interconnection project was targeted by the end of 2024.

The Cebu-Bohol Interconnection Project was partially energized (Line 1) on July 16, 2024, and fully energized (Line 2) on September 27, 2024, with a total power of 1,200 MW.

== Franchise law and concession agreement ==
Unlike outright sale, the concession agreement allowed the Philippine government to continue ownership of the existing power grid assets, components, and portions through TransCo where NGCP only covers the operations, maintenance, and expansion for them. NGCP temporarily owns those that were acquired and designated since the said date of January 2009 and they will be transferred to TransCo once its franchise ends or is revoked. Assuming it secures a renewal, it has a 50-year concession period from its creation on January 15, 2009, to December 1, 2058. Under its franchise, it has the right to operate and maintain the transmission system and related facilities, and the right of eminent domain necessary to construct, expand, maintain, and operate the transmission system.

=== Acquisition and designation of lands for transmission structures and right-of-way, and construction of power line structures ===
As stated before, NGCP has a right of eminent domain necessary to construct, expand, maintain, and operate the transmission system under its franchise as it is able to commence and pursue eminent domain proceedings for the purpose of acquiring and designating new lands for the transmission components and their respective foundations or pedestals, and right of way (portions of a power line) that are required to carry out its responsibilities, making them under NGCP temporary ownership for those that were acquired, designated, and built from January 15, 2009, or during the concession period, subject to transfer to TransCo upon NGCP franchise end or revocation.

Under the NGCP's concession agreement with TransCo and the latter's mandate which is to handle all existing cases including right-of-way and claims which accrued before the turnover of operations and maintenance of the grid to NGCP and start of concession period on January 15, 2009, TransCo continued ownership on structures and pedestals, and their exact locations or lands, and particular portions of the power line acquired and designated by National Power Corporation (NAPOCOR/NPC) and TransCo or prior to the turnover of operations and maintenance of the power grid from TransCo to NGCP and start of concession period on January 15, 2009, even before the structures were built. These include that were already built before January 15, 2009, but the transmission line itself is not yet finished. Therefore, NGCP only acts as TransCo's agent for those.

== Organization ==
Below is a table listing the board of directors and officials of NGCP. The NGCP organization or board of directors consists of a chairman, two vice-chairmen, and seven directors. The president serves as the head of NGCP.

Name	Position	Credentials
Zhu Guangchao	Chairman	Vice Chief Engineer and Director General of International Cooperation Department of the State Grid Corporation of China (SGCC), Vice Chairman of Redes Energeticas Nacionais SA in Lisboa, Portugal, and Board Director of Hongkong Electric Company
Robert Coyiuto Jr.	Vice Chairman	CEO of Prudential Guarantee and Assurance, Inc., chairman of the Board of PGA Cars, Inc. and PGA Sompo Insurance, Inc., Vice Chairman of First Life Financial Co., Inc., President, Oriental Petroleum and Minerals Corporation, Director, Canon Philippines, Inc., and Director, Universal Robina Corporation
Henry Sy Jr.	Vice Chairman	Vice-Chairman, SM Investments Corporation, Vice-Chairman and CEO of SM Development Corporation and vice-chairman and President of Highlands Prime, Inc. and SM Land, Inc. He also sits as Director of SM Prime Holdings, Inc. and Banco de Oro Unibank, Inc
Anthony Almeda	Director, President and CEO	Chairman and CEO, ALALMEDA Land, Inc., and Director, Blue Ocean Acquisitions, Inc., CUTAD, Inc., BS Square Commercial, Inc., PACIFICA 21 Holdings, Inc., Leisure & Resort World, Inc., BIGBOX 21, Inc., and MIGUELUNDA Educational Corporation.
Jose Pardo	Director	Chairman, Philippine Stock Exchange, Electronic Commerce Payment Network, Inc., OOCC General Construction Corp., and Philippine Savings Bank and Director, ZNN Radio Veritas, Bank of Commerce, JG Summit Holdings, Inc., and Bank of Commerce Investment Corporation
Francis Chua	Director	Chairman Emeritus, Philippine Chamber of Commerce and Industry, Inc., President, DongFeng Automotive, Inc., and Member of Board Directors, Philippine Stock Exchange and the Bank of Commerce
Shan shewu	Director	Chief Representative, State Grid Corporation of China (SGCC) Philippine Office
Liu Ming	Director	Deputy Chief Representative, State Grid Corporation of China (SGCC) Philippine Office, former Chief Representative of SGCC Africa Office, and Technical Director of Market Exploration of SGCC Australia Office.
Liu Xinhua	Director	Engineer with a master's degree and one of the topnotchers in the CPA Board Exam of China
Paul Sagayo Jr.	Director	Partner - Sagayo Law Offices, and Professor, San Beda College of Law

== Presidents ==
- Walter A. Brown (January 15, 2009 – March 26, 2010)
- Roque Corpuz (March 26–June 20, 2010)
- Henry Sy Jr. (June 20, 2010 – March 7, 2018)
- Anthony Almeda (March 7, 2018–present)

== Voltages and reference codes ==
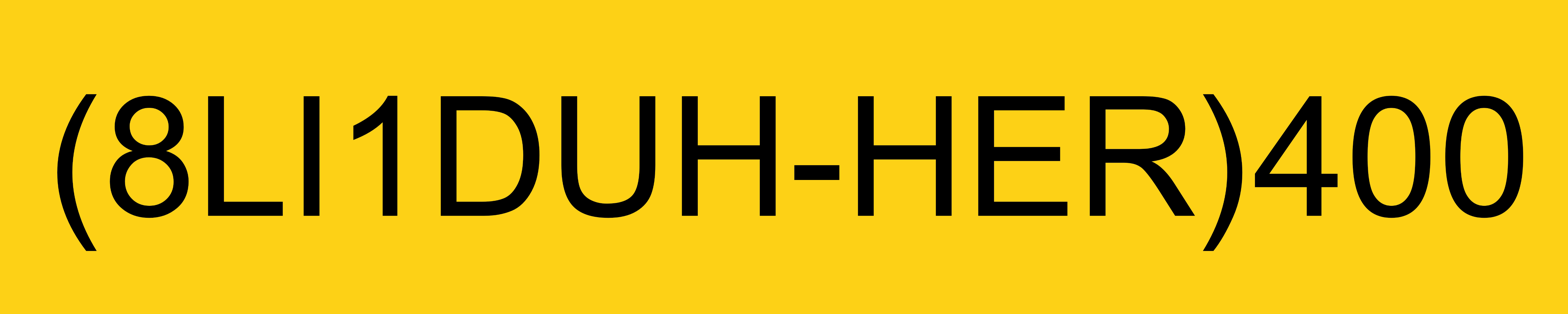
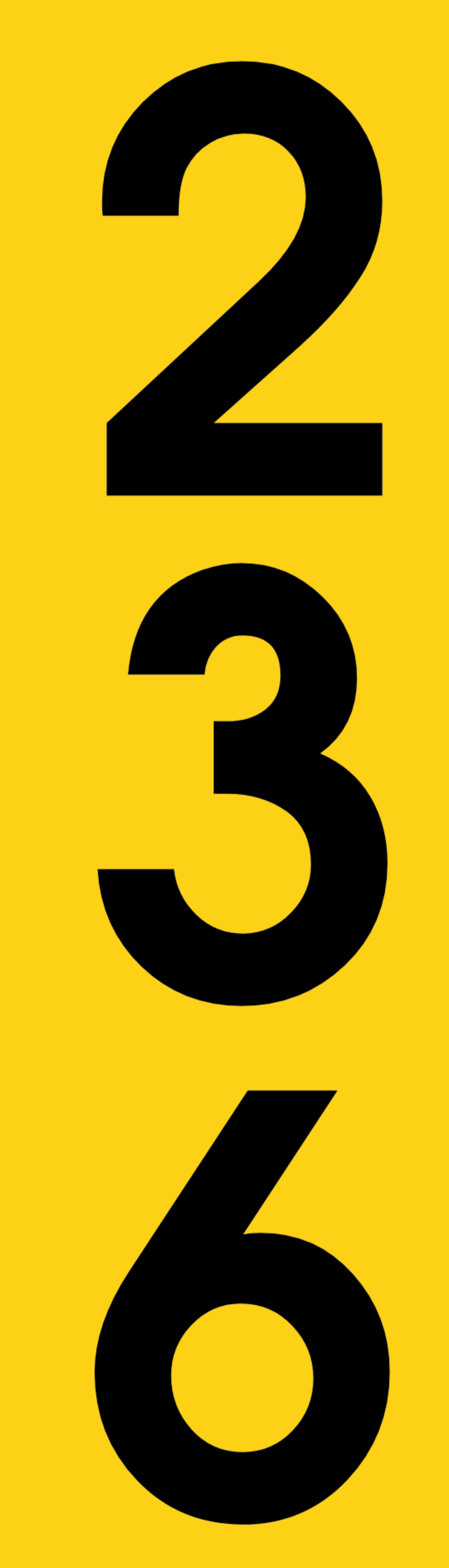
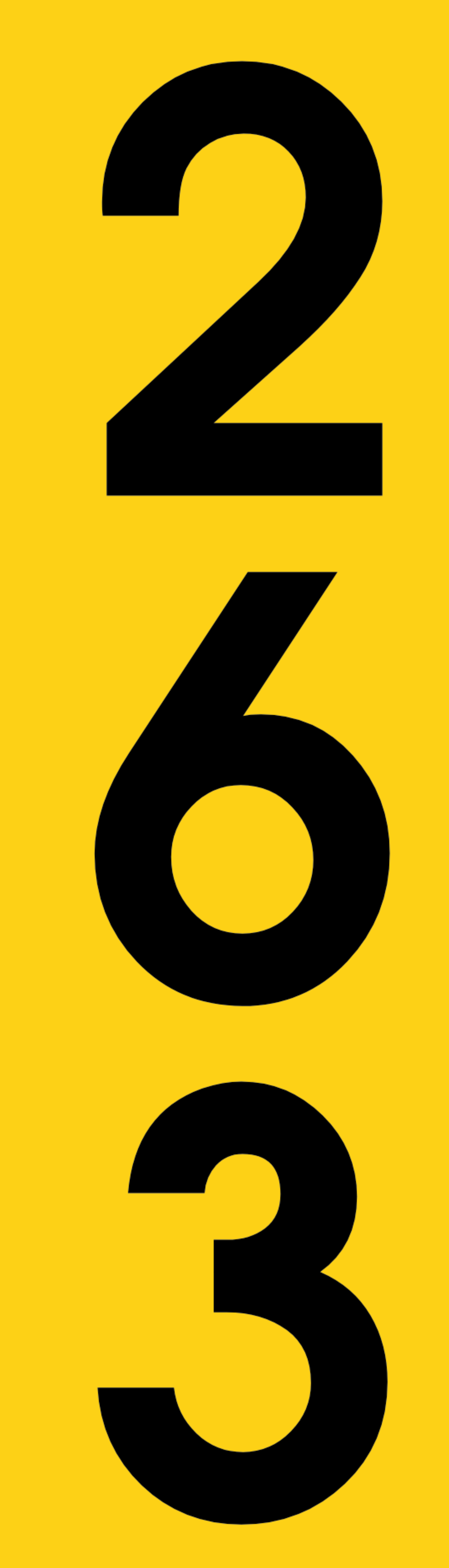
First: Example of the pole identifier of Hermosa-Duhat segment of Hermosa-Duhat-Balintawak Transmission Line. It shows the segment's steel pole 400, which is pole 6 of the whole line located along Jose Abad Santos Avenue in Lubao, Pampanga. The typeface is Arial Light.; Second: The steel pole number of NGCP-acquired and designated pole 236 of relocated San Simon-Pulilan section of Hermosa-Duhat-Balintawak Transmission Line, set in ITC Avant Garde typeface, located along North Luzon Expressway (NLEX) in San Simon, Pampanga.; Third: Same as before, but is used on steel pole 263 of the relocated line segment along Candaba Viaduct of NLEX in Apalit, Pampanga.

NGCP operates various voltages depends on length, power loss, etc. The Luzon Grid operates 69kV (5LI), 138kV (7LI), 230kV (8LI), and 500kV (9LI). Visayas and Mindanao grids operates 69kV (5LI), 138kV (7LI) and 230kV (8LI). The connection between the grids of each island groups of the Philippines has 350kV (0LI). The common voltage in NGCP is 230kV, simplest voltage is 69kV and 138kV and the highest voltage is 500kV EHV (Used on Luzon Grid).

Reference codes are either in the form of a whole number or the structure code "((voltage number)LI(circuit number)(start of transmission line)-(end of transmission line))(structure number)". Various fonts or typefaces have been used on structure numbers and codes, such as Arial (Light and Bold variants) and ITC Avant Garde (same also with NGCP's predecessors in Philippine power grid operations, maintenance, expansion, and management and its related assets and facilities National Power Corporation (NAPOCOR/NPC) from November 1936 to March 1, 2003, and National Transmission Corporation (TransCo) from March 1, 2003, to January 15, 2009).

If the structures were removed from their original location, like in the case of removed steel poles of Hermosa–Duhat–Balintawak transmission line due to various project made on the said power line, they will either be stored at random NGCP substation and later used on other lines or within the substation, or retired completely if unfit for reusing. If the former case occurs, the original reference number, use, and land and facility or structure ownership will be disregarded and the current number, use, and ownership will be counted. Sometimes when reusing on other uses, the removed facilities or structures will then change design to fit with their current use, with their bottom part still have the original number and ownership.

=== List of voltage codes and pole ID prefixes ===
Here are the list of voltage codes:

Voltage codes of NGCP (common voltage levels in Philippines)
ID	Voltage	Voltage (kV)	Notes	Refs
1	230	0.23 kV	Lowest voltage (distribution).	
2			Unassigned code.	
3			Unassigned code.	
4	34,500	34 kV	Used by electric companies.	
5	69,000	69 kV		
6	115,000	115 kV		
7	132,000	132 kV		
8	230,000/350,000	230/350 kV	350 kV is used in HVDC lines.	
9	500,000	500 kV	500 kV is used only in Luzon Grid.	

The structured ID (ex. (8LI1ABC-DEF)123) and split into prefixes:

8 - voltage code (230,000 volts, 230 kV)

LI - denotes a power line

1 - denotes the number of circuit(s)

ABC - denotes "from" location

DEF - denotes a destination

123 - denotes a pole number

The parenthesis at the beginning of 8LI1ABC-DEF is a transmission line or power line.

== Business scope ==
Below is a table listing the district numbers and what areas or provinces that each district covers.

=== Luzon ===
==== North Luzon ====
District	Area	Service Area
1	Ilocos	Ilocos Norte, Ilocos Sur, Abra, and La Union
2	Mountain Province	Mt. Province and Benguet
3	Central Plain	East and West Pangasinan
4	Cagayan Valley	Nueva Vizcaya, Quirino, Ifugao, Isabela, Cagayan, Kalinga, and Apayao
5	Western Central Plain	Bataan and Zambales
6	South Central Plain	Pampanga and Tarlac
7	NCR	Bulacan, Rizal, and Metro Manila

==== South Luzon ====
District	Area	Service Area
1	South Western Tagalog	Batangas, Cavite, and South of Metro Manila
2	South Eastern Tagalog	Laguna and Quezon
3	Bicol	Camarines Norte, Camarines Sur, Albay, and Sorsogon

=== Visayas ===
District	Area	Service Area
1	Eastern	Samar and Leyte
2	Central	Cebu and Bohol
3	Negros	Negros Island
4	Western	Panay Island

=== Mindanao ===
District	Area	Service Area
1	North Western	Zamboanga del Norte, Zamboanga del Sur, and Misamis Occidental
2	Lanao	Lanao del Norte and Lanao del Sur
3	North Central	Bukidnon and Misamis Oriental
4	North Eastern	Agusan del Norte, Agusan del Sur, Surigao del Norte, and Surigao del Sur
5	South Eastern	Davao, Davao del Norte, Davao del Sur, Davao de Oro, and Davao Oriental
6	South Western	Cotabato, South Cotabato, Sultan Kudarat, Maguindanao del Norte, Maguindanao del Sur, and Sarangani

== See also ==
- List of Philippine companies
- National Transmission Corporation
- National Power Corporation
