= National Transmission Corporation =

Philippine government-owned utility enterprise

- Pambansang Korporasyon sa Transmisyon (Filipino)

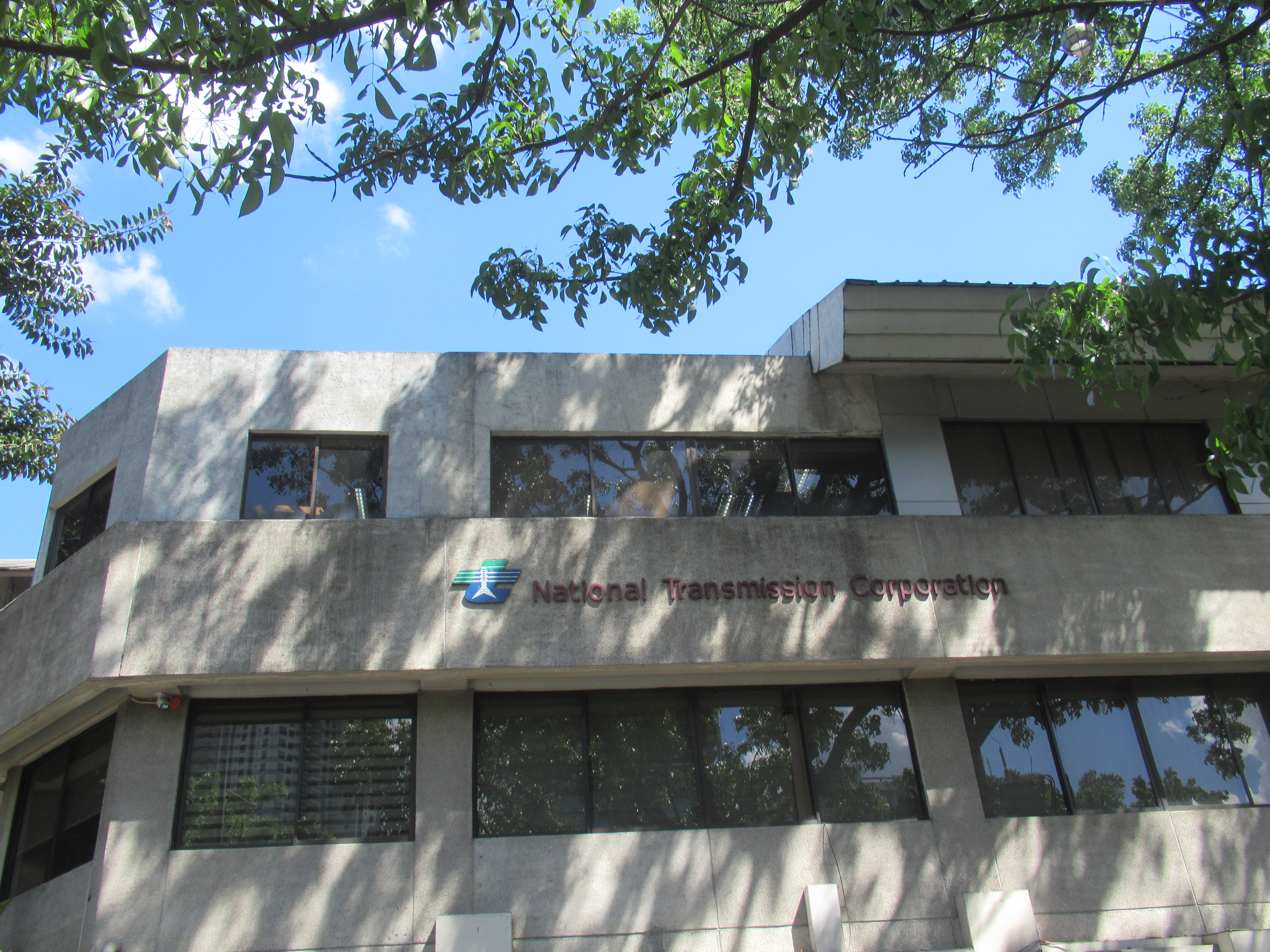
- Corporate headquarters of TransCo

Agency overview
- Formed: June 26, 2001; 25 years ago (agency's establishment); March 1, 2003; 23 years ago (pre-National Grid Corporation of the Philippines (NGCP) power grid portions operations, maintenance, and ownership) (Note: Although TransCo was established on June 26, 2001, it only started to operate, maintain, and own the portions of Philippine power grid acquired and designated before the January 15, 2009 turnover of operations, maintenance, and management to National Grid Corporation of the Philippines (NGCP) on March 1, 2003 when it became independent from another government-owned corporation National Power Corporation (NAPOCOR/NPC). TransCo operated and maintained the power grid from March 1, 2003, to the said date of January 2009. Ownership of grid parts with acquisition and designation made before the turnover date to NGCP, however, is with TransCo since March 2003. Thus, TransCo is the successor to NAPOCOR/NPC in operations, maintenance, and ownership of pre-NGCP power grid portions.)
- Headquarters: Power Center, Quezon Avenue corner Senator Miriam P. Defensor-Santiago Avenue (BIR Road), Diliman, Quezon City, Metro Manila 1101, Philippines
- Agency executives: Frederick Go (Chairman); Sharon Garin (Vice chairman); Atty. Joseph Omar A. Castillo (President and CEO)
- Parent department: Department of Energy; National Power Corporation (formerly; June 26, 2001 – March 1, 2003)
- Website: www.transco.ph

The National Transmission Corporation (Filipino: Pambansang Korporasyon sa Transmisyon), also known as TransCo, is a Philippine government-owned and controlled corporation established on June 26, 2001 by the Electric Power Industry Reform Act (Republic Act 9136), a corporate entity wholly owned by the Power Sector Assets and Liabilities Management (PSALM), and former originally a child agency of National Power Corporation (NAPOCOR). The agency owns the country's power grid right-of-way or portions of a power line, and components and their exact lands or locations that were acquired and designated before the turnover of operations, management, maintenance, and eminent domain to the privately-owned National Grid Corporation of the Philippines (NGCP) on January 15, 2009 as such handling cases regarding them. It also served as operator of the grid from March 1, 2003 until January 2009 when it became separate from NAPOCOR.

TransCo is also responsible for protecting the national government's interests by monitoring NGCP's compliance with the standards set by its concession agreement with NGCP, congressional franchise and other relevant laws, divest remaining sub-transmission assets to technically and financially qualified electric distributors nationwide, and undertake the operations, maintenance, consultancy and other technical services for the Philippine Economic Zone Authority (PEZA) and Authority of the Freeport Area of Bataan (AFAB). It is also in charge of administering the FIT to renewable power generators.

== History ==
=== 2001–2009: Power grid before the privatization of operations and maintenance ===
==== 2001–2003: TransCo as a child agency of NAPOCOR ====
On June 8, 2001, President Gloria Macapagal Arroyo signed RA 9136 (Electric Power Industry Reform Act), which introduced market competition in the energy sector and mandated the creation of TransCo 18 days after the law was approved on June 26, 2001 with Asisclo T. Gonzaga as its first president. TransCo was originally a child agency of National Power Corporation (NAPOCOR) before the transfer of the grid to the former, acting on behalf of the latter where power grid portions with acquisition and designation from June 26, 2001 to March 1, 2003 continue to use NAPOCOR name as owner and operator.

TransCo's System Operations (SO) Group obtained an ISO 9001:2000 Certification where it is the first SO group in the Southeast Asia to obtain the said certification in 2001.

In October 2002, as mandated on Section 21 of EPIRA which will privatize the soon-to-be successor of NAPOCOR in power grid operations, maintenance, and ownership TransCo by March 1, 2003, Gloria Macapagal Arroyo proved a plan to privatize the latter through a 25-year Operation and Management Concession Agreement.

Asisclo T. Gonzaga stepped down as president on January 1, 2003, and he was replaced by Dr. Alan T. Ortiz five days later on January 6, 2003, two months before the turnover of operations, maintenance, management, expansion, construction, and eminent domain of the country's power grid from NAPOCOR to TransCo.

==== 2003–2009: Turnover of Philippine power grid from NAPOCOR to TransCo and latter as operator ====
TransCo started to operate, maintain, and own the Philippine power grid which turned over from NAPOCOR on March 1, 2003 marking the effectivity of RA 9136 or EPIRA that organized the industry into four sectors: generation, transmission, distribution and supply and separating from the latter, with Dr. Alan T. Ortiz (which appointed two months earlier) also became the first TransCo president to serve after the turnover of operations, management, and ownership of the grid from NAPOCOR to TransCo. Its transmission lines links various power plants, distribution utilities (such as Manila Electric Company), and electric cooperatives. It served as power grid operator from March 2003, until its turnover of operations, maintenance, management, expansion, construction, and eminent domain of the grid to privately owned National Grid Corporation of the Philippines (NGCP) on January 15, 2009, following its separation from NAPOCOR where TransCo became a standalone government agency.

In September 2004, Power Sector Assets and Liabilities Management (PSALM) received but rejected proposals from four groups with different offers for the TransCo contract that eventually led to a decision to conduct a public bidding.

In June 2005, TransCo garnered the fifth highest score in the Corporate Governance Scorecard for GOCCs & GFIs in the field of Corporate Governance from the Institute of Corporate Directors (ICD).

On September 22, 2005, PSALM filed at the Energy Regulatory Commission (ERC) a petition for a regulatory reset of the maximum annual revenue for TransCo and other concessionaires. From 2003 to 2006, three auctions failed mostly as a result of issues regarding regulatory framework and right-of-way.

In January 2006, TransCo wrote history by bagging the Philippine Quality Award Recognition for Commitment to Quality Management.

In August 2006, TransCo's implementation of Spatial Data Infrastructure Project received a Special Achievement in Geographic Information System (GIS) Award, conferred by the Environmental Systems Research Institute, Inc. (ESRI) in California, United States.

On December 12, 2007, 2 consortia bid for a 25-year license to run the Philippine power grid – privatization of the management of TransCo: the consortium of Monte Oro Grid Resources Corp., comprising the State Grid Corporation of China, and Calaca High Power Corp., won in an auction conducted by the Power Sector Assets and Liabilities Management (PSALM) Corp. as it submitted the highest offer of $3.95 billion, for the right to operate TransCo for 25 years, outbidding San Miguel Energy, a unit of San Miguel Corporation (bid of $3.59 billion), Dutch firm TPG Aurora BV and Malaysia's TNB Prai Sdn Bhd. Jose Ibazeta, PSALM president and CEO remarked: “We are very happy about the successful turnout of the bidding for TransCo. PSALM handled the privatization of the government's transmission business with utmost transparency and judiciousness." This initiated the privatization process for the transmission sector.

On February 28, 2008, TransCo's concession agreement with NGCP was executed and became effective.

TransCo bagged the Mother Nature Award where it is given annually to companies that demonstrate effective compliance with environmental regulations and those that design and successfully implement sound Environmental Management System (EMS) and Environmental Management Programs (EMP) beyond mere compliance with existing laws in 2008.

Congress approved bicameral resolution granting franchise to NGCP to manage and operate its transmission facilities nationwide in November 2008.

President Gloria Macapagal Arroyo signed RA 9511 into law granting franchise to NGCP in December of that same year.

On January 15, 2009, TransCo privatized the operations, maintenance, management, expansion, construction, and eminent domain of the transmission system by turning them over to NGCP which marked the start of the 25-year concession period and renewable for another 25 years with a total of 50 years. Ownership of the country's power grid assets, portions, and components acquired and designated before the turnover date, however, remains with the Philippine government through TransCo while those from the said date of January 2009 are placed temporarily under NGCP ownership and will be transferred to TransCo once its franchise expires or is revoked. With these, it created temporary dual ownership over the grid, with TransCo on pre-privatization and NGCP during the concession period.

=== 2009–present: TransCo after the turnover of operations and maintenance to NGCP, privatized power grid operations and maintenance ===
TransCo assumed its new role as a result of the privatization of operations, maintenance, management, expansion, construction, and eminent domain upon their turnover to NGCP on January 15, 2009, which was to protect the national government's interest by ensuring NGCP's compliance with the terms and conditions of its concession agreement with NGCP, policies of the Department of Energy (DOE) and other relevant laws, handle existing cases, divest the remaining sub-transmission assets, and administer the Feed-in-Tariff Allowance Fund for renewable energy generators. Arthur N. Aguilar continued to serve as TransCo president even after the turnover to NGCP on January 15, 2009, until he was replaced by Moslemen T. Macarambon, Sr. six months later on July 16, 2009, as a result of taking a new oath of office of the new table of TransCo organization.

The Department of Budget and Management approved the new structure of TransCo on April 20, 2009 consequent to the privatization of its transmission business three months earlier on January 15, 2009.

The new table of organization employees took a new oath of office on July 16, 2009, which results in the formation of a new TransCo.

In November 2012, ERC named TransCo as fit-allowance fund administrator and was given an added role in renewable energy sector.

On March 24, 2017, TransCo receives its ISO certification for Quality Management System from TÜV Rheinland.

On June 8, 2018, the Department of Information and Communications Technology (DICT), NGCP, and TransCo signed an agreement on Friday for a national broadband plan that will help accelerate internet connectivity nationwide. Under the agreement, the DICT will utilize TransCo's reserved optical fiber to distribute connectivity from Luzon to Mindanao using the submarine cables that will be laid down by Facebook from the United States to Asia. The agreement plans to expand the internet connectivity in public places for free by building an additional 200,000 access points nationwide by 2022, DICT Officer-In-Charge Eliseo Rio said.

In 2022, the Presidential Communications Operations Office (PCOO) presented the Certificate of Compliance to TransCo for meeting the necessary requirements pursuant to Section 5.7.b of Memorandum Circular No. 2020–1 on the Harmonization of National Government Performance, Monitoring, Information, and Reporting Systems.

In January 2022, TransCo has succeeded in testing and applying emerging ICT technologies that will make use of existing power line infrastructures to help the Department of Education (DepEd) to implement the Public Education Network program of DepEd that will provide connectivity and high-speed internet to public schools nationwide amid the pandemic. TransCo president Melvin Matibag said the Public Education Network-Communications Infrastructure for Learning (PEN-CIL) project would address the challenges of DepEd in ensuring the continuity of learning amid the pandemic and the expected transition to the New Normal by providing Internet connectivity in all public schools.

In May 2022, TransCo and Palawan Electric Cooperative (PALECO) signed a memorandum of agreement (MOA) mandating the corporation to perform all functions of Small Grid System Operator to address the lingering power issues in Palawan. Said MOA signing is in accordance with the Department of Energy (DOE) Department Circular No. 2021-11-0039 “Mandating the National Transmission Corporation as Small Grid System Operator in Specific Areas."

On December 12, 2025, TransCo applied the Green Energy Auction (GEA)-All with approval of Energy Regulatory Commission (ERC) which will be added on power charges starting from January 2026.

On June 19, 2026, the Energy Regulatory Commission (ERC) stripped NGCP of its exclusive monopoly, allowing Transco and qualified power generation companies to build electric grids while bypassing the grid operated by NGCP.

== Controversies ==
In May 2017, TransCo accused NGCP with violating its concession agreement with the power grid operator by supposedly making too much money from its operations of the country's electricity grid. Executive Secretary Salvador Medialdea pointed out that, if indeed NGCP had violated the terms of its contract by profiting unduly from the operations of the power grid such as allowing telecommunications firms to mount their fiber optic cables on the transmission towers.

In a November 2019 session, the Senate of the Philippines was informed that Chinese part ownership of the National Grid Corporation of the Philippines – the Philippines sole power transmission line company – gave China the power to remotely switch off the Philippine electrical grid. Senator Sherwin "Win" Gatchalian said that he was advised by the president of TransCo that it was possible for China to shut down the Philippine electrical grid remotely "given the technological advancement right now in the telecommunications as well as in software." Gatchalian also said it would "take about 24 to 48 hours, depending on the gravity, to bring the grid back up."

Senator Richard "Dick" Gordon raised security concerns about the Philippines having "given our grid – although 40% it appears – to a foreign corporation that has interests that collide with our country in the West Philippine Sea," given that China "obviously has a hegemonic ambition."

In 2021, the National Association of Electricity Consumers for Reforms, Inc. (NASECORE) has called on the Energy Department to conduct a systems audit of NGCP for what it called a “dismal failure” of the grid operator “to ensure the quality, reliability, security and affordability of the supply of electric power” as required by law. In a letter to Energy Secretary Alfonso Cusi dated December 21, 2021, NASECORE said: “This failure had been repeatedly witnessed during the 2013 Super Typhoon Yolanda, Typhoon Ruby in 2014 and the earthquake of 2017 due to its apparent inadequate, weak and grossly unreliable transmission system that are easily felled by typhoons.” NASECORE President Pete Ilagan said this performance of NGCP is unacceptable and unfair to electric cooperatives and distribution utilities who bear the brunt of the blame from consumers for the grid operators’ weak and the unreliable transmission system. NASECORE urged the Energy Department to conduct an immediate and transparent audit (an actual inspection and documentation) of NGCP's transmission system, to determine the required upgrading and improvisation that would establish a resilient transmission system nationwide, and ERC to conduct a regulatory audit of the funds it provided NGCP meant specifically for Capital Expenditures, which covers the rehabilitation and upgrading of the nationwide transmission system. Ilagan added that the concession agreement of NGCP with TransCo should be reviewed for possible violations as well as a review of NGCP's congressional franchise by the Joint Congressional Energy Commission (JCEC) to protect public interest.

On May 17, 2023, Malacañang said that TransCo will be taking back control of NGCP “if necessary”. The statement came after President Bongbong Marcos and Sen. Raffy Tulfo's meeting at the presidential palace on Monday during which the lawmaker expressed concerns about the issues hounding NGCP, including its being partly owned by a Chinese state company. Marcos agreed with the proposal of Tulfo, who chairs the Senate energy panel, to conduct a comprehensive study on the NGCP or hold hearings to determine the real situation of the power grid. The Department of Energy proposed during a hearing at the House of Representatives on Tuesday amendments to the Electric Power Industry Reform Act of 2001 to prohibit foreign governments or state-owned enterprises from owning a stake in transmission operations. Tulfo had proposed to return the operation of the transmission grid to TransCo, while its maintenance is left to the NGCP. Tulfo and a handful of other senators are calling for the re-nationalization of the power grid, although Sen. Francis Escudero warned that this might send a bad signal to foreign investors.

On January 10, 2024, Senator Raffy Tulfo accused TransCo for being lenient to NGCP, emphasizing the former to be more assertive in holding the latter become accountable and should be firm.

== Organization ==
Below is a table listing the officials of TransCo which are appointed by the President of the Philippines with the consent of the Commission on Appointments (CA). The TransCo organization consists of president and CEO serving as head of the government agency, secretaries of Departments of Finance, Energy and Environment and Natural Resources, with DOF secretary serving as ex officio chairman, representatives for Luzon, Visayas and Mindanao, Corporate Secretary and Compliance Officer, and Vice Presidents for General Counsel, Right-of-Way and Legal Group, Management Transmission Group and Resource Management Services Group. The DOF, DOE and DENR secretaries, TransCo president and CEO, Luzon, Visayas and Mindanao representatives, and Corporate Secretary and Compliance Officer form the TransCo board of directors.

Name	Position	Credentials
Frederick Go	Chairman	Secretary, Department of Finance
Sharon Garin	Vice Chairman	Secretary, Department of Energy
Atty. Joseph Omar A. Castillo	President and CEO	
Atty. Juan Miguel “Mitch” T. Cuna	Acting Secretary	Secretary, Department of Environment and Natural Resources
Atty. Freidrick Vincent C. Lu	Director, Luzon Representative	
Atty. Tito E. Pinto, Jr.	Director, Visayas Representative	
Atty. Paolo E. Abarquez	Director, Mindanao Representative	
Atty. Edgardo L. Padilla	Director, Corporate Secretary and Compliance Officer	
Dinna O. Dizon	Vice President - Management Transmission Group	
Atty. Noel Z. De Leon	Vice President - General Counsel, Right-of-Way and Legal Group	
Maria Theresa L. Laranang	Vice President - Resource Management Services Group	

== Presidents ==
Name	Term	President
Asisclo T. Gonzaga	August 30, 2001–January 1, 2003	Gloria Macapagal Arroyo
Dr. Alan T. Ortiz	January 6, 2003–September 25, 2006	Gloria Macapagal Arroyo
Arthur N. Aguilar	September 25, 2006–July 16, 2009	Gloria Macapagal Arroyo
Moslemen T. Macarambon, Sr.	July 16, 2009–October 31, 2010	Gloria Macapagal Arroyo; Benigno Aquino III
Melinda T. Nuique – OIC	October 31, 2010–February 2011	Benigno Aquino III
Rolando T. Bacani	February 2011–August 31, 2015	Benigno Aquino III
Generoso M. Senal – OIC	August 31, 2015–January 2017	Benigno Aquino III; Rodrigo Duterte
Melvin Matibag	January 2017–March 9, 2022	Rodrigo Duterte
Jainal Abidin Y. Bahjin II	March 15–September 23, 2022	Rodrigo Duterte; Bongbong Marcos
Dr. Rowena Cristina L. Guevara	September 23, 2022–January 13, 2023	Bongbong Marcos
Dinna O. Dizon – OIC	January 13, 2023–November 10, 2023	Bongbong Marcos
Engr. Fortunato C. Leynes	November 10, 2023–May 25, 2026	Bongbong Marcos
Atty. Joseph Omar A. Castillo	May 25, 2026–Present	Bongbong Marcos

== Chairman ==
The Department of Finance secretary serves as ex officio chairman of TransCo which is appointed by the President of the Philippines with the consent of the Commission on Appointments (CA).

Name	Term	Appointing president
Alberto G. Romulo	June 26–30, 2001	Gloria Macapagal Arroyo
Jose Isidro N. Camacho	June 30, 2001 – November 30, 2003	Gloria Macapagal Arroyo
Juanita D. Amatong	December 1, 2003 – February 14, 2005	Gloria Macapagal Arroyo
Margarito B. Teves	July 22, 2005 – June 30, 2010	Gloria Macapagal Arroyo
Cesar V. Purisima	February 15 – July 15, 2005; June 30, 2010 – June 30, 2016	Gloria Macapagal Arroyo; Benigno Aquino III
Carlos Dominguez III	June 30, 2016 – June 30, 2022	Rodrigo Duterte
Benjamin Diokno	June 30, 2022 – January 12, 2024	Bongbong Marcos
Ralph Recto	January 12, 2024 – November 17, 2025	Bongbong Marcos
Frederick Go	November 17, 2025 – present	Bongbong Marcos

== See also ==
- List of Philippine companies
- National Grid Corporation of the Philippines
- National Power Corporation
