= University of the Philippines Asian Center =

- Pulungang-aral ng Asya
- Former names: Institute of Asian Studies (1955 - 1968); Asian Center (1968-1973); Philippine Center for Advanced Studies (1973-1979)
- Type: Degree-granting unit of the University of the Philippines
- Established: 1955
- Affiliations: Consortium for Southeast Asian Studies in Asia; Kyoto International Consortium for Asian Studies
- Dean: Assoc. Prof. Noel Christian A. Moratilla, Ph.D.
- College Secretary: Prof. Joefe B. Santarita, Ph.D.
- Academic staff: 12 full-time faculty
- Location: GT-Toyota Asian Cultural Center, Asian Center, UP Diliman, Quezon City
- Website: ac.upd.edu.ph

The University of the Philippines Asian Center (also referred to as UP Asian Center or UP AC) is a degree-granting unit of the University of the Philippines Diliman, and is the only unit of the university with a regional area of specialization. The Asian Center offers multidisciplinary graduate programs on Asian Studies and on Philippine Studies. Its mandate is underpinned by Republic Act No. 5334, which was enacted in June 1968. The Center is a member of Consortium for Southeast Asian Studies in Asia and the Kyoto International Consortium for Asian Studies (KICAS).

== History ==
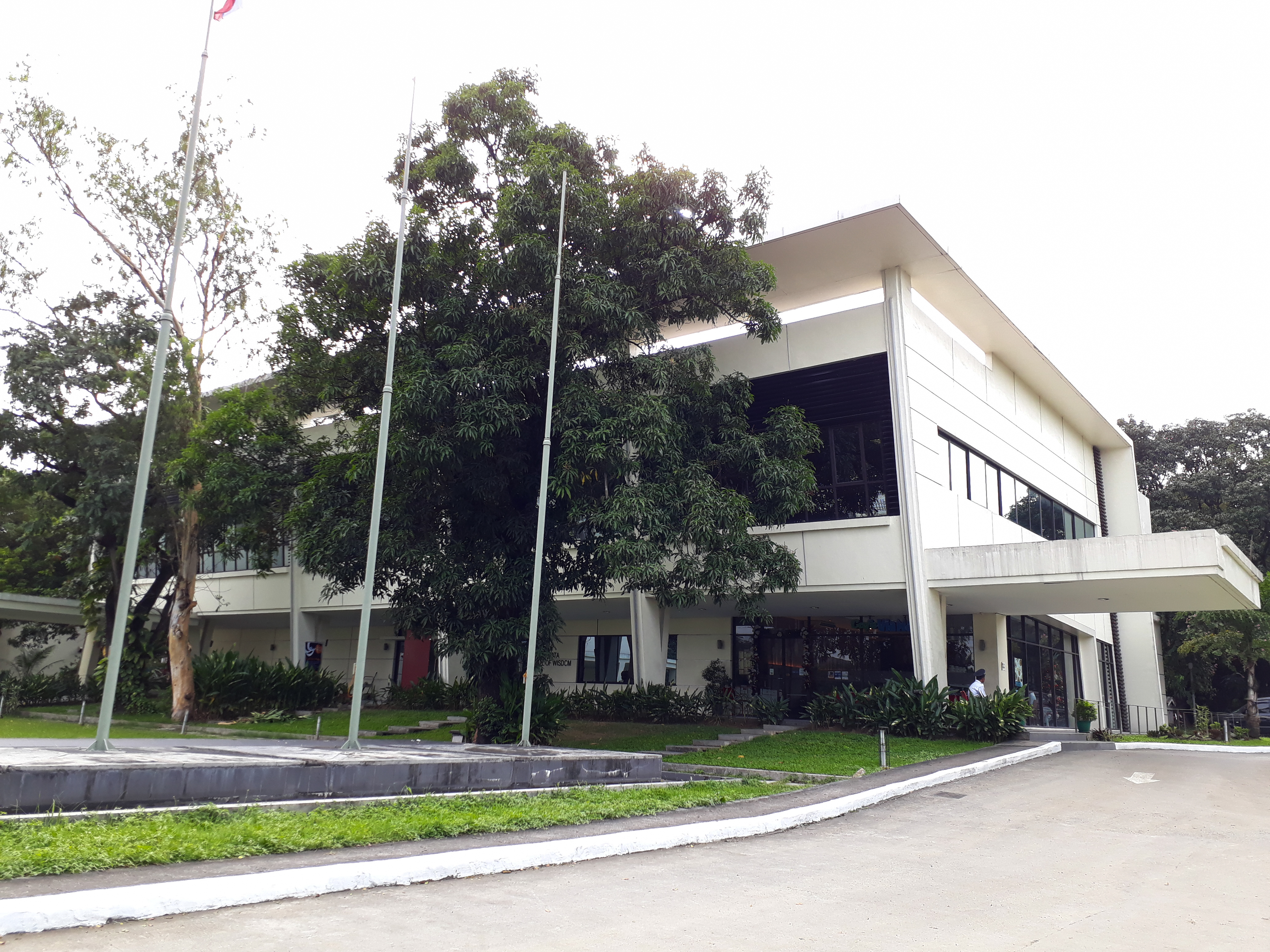
The GT-Toyota Center.

The Asian Center was established in 1955 as Institute of Asian Studies, and was mandated to conduct research for advancement and promotion of studies on Asia. The Institute was reorganized in 1968 though Republic Act (R.A.) 5334, converting it into the Asian Center. Under the R.A. 5334, it is "declared as a national policy to develop a closer and broader contact with or Asian neighbors in the field of learning and scholarship to attain knowledge of our national identity in relation to other Asian nations through profound studies on Asian cultures, histories, social forces and aspirations." From 1973 to 1979, the Center was put under the Philippine Center for Advanced Studies (PCAS), but was reverted to its original status through a decision by the Board of Regents during its 919th meeting. Through R.A. 5334, the Center managed to become a degree-granting institution while continuing to performs its research functions.

In present days, the Asian Center is located at the GT-Toyota Center in UP Diliman. The Center currently offers graduate degree programs in Asian Studies and Philippine Studies; training country and area specialists, while promoting initiatives to "understand the Philippines in its broader Asian context, and to understand Asia from the Philippine vantage point."

== Programs ==
The Asian Center offers Master of Arts programs in Asian Studies and in Philippine Studies, with both offering an option of nonthesis track. A Doctorate program in Philippine Studies, jointly administered with the College of Arts and Letters and College of Social Sciences and Philosophy is also being offered by the Center since 2004.

Students undertaking their Master's program in Asian Studies are grounded on theories on area studies, research methodologies, and on various social sciences. The students take courses on various areas such as history, politics and governance, culture, and economic development of their area of specialization. Aside from these courses, students are also required to demonstrate competence in one Asian language. Students taking their Master's degree in Asian Studies specializes on one of four area of specializations namely:

- Northeast Asia (China, Japan, or Korea)
- Southeast Asia
- South Asia, OR
- West Asia (Middle East)

On the other hand, the Philippine Studies program is designed to produce specialists with a broad and integrated comprehension of Philippine society, external relations, political and socio-economic development, and culture. It also includes the study of Filipino society and culture and its constituent ethnolinguistic groups. Students taking the program can specialize on one of the following areas such as Philippine Socio-Cultural Studies, Philippine Foreign Relations, and Philippine Development Studies.

The Asian Center does not offer undergraduate programs.

== Notable people ==
- Kara David - Master of Arts in Philippine Studies graduate
- Nur Misuari - Master in Asian Studies graduate
- Aileen Baviera - Former Dean of Asian Center, political scientist, and sinologist
