= Pupa Gilbert =

Italian-American biophysicist and geobiologist

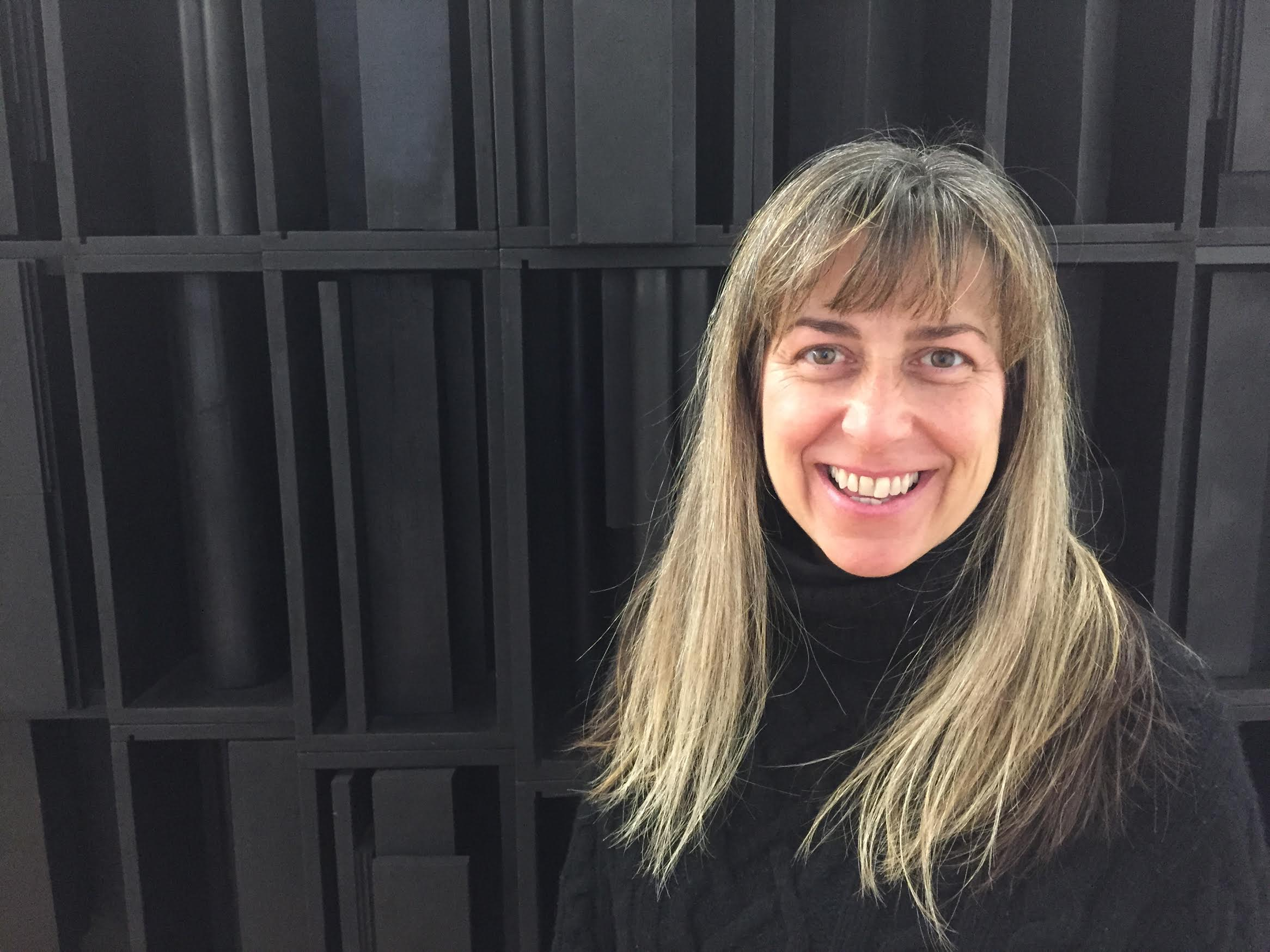
- Born: September 29, 1964 (age 61)
- Education: Sapienza University of Rome
- Known for: biomineralization, synchrotron spectromicroscopy
- Awards: 2001 Knighthood of Italy, 2010 Fellow, American Physical Society, 1997 "TOYP" Award (The Outstanding Young Persons of the world),2012 International Science & Engineering Visualization Challenge (2015)
- Scientific career
- Fields: Biophysics
- Workplaces: University of Wisconsin–Madison

Pupa Gilbert is an American biophysicist and geobiologist. She has been pioneering synchrotron spectromicroscopy methods since 1989, and she continues to use and develop them today. Since 2004 she has focused on biomineralization in sea urchins, mollusk shells, and tunicates. She and her group are frequent users of the Berkeley-Advanced Light Source.

== Biography ==
She was born and raised in Rome, Italy; her previous name was Gelsomina De Stasio. She was a staff scientist at the Italian National Research Council (Istituto di Struttura della Materia) and at the Ecole Polytechnique Federale de Lausanne. In 1999 she moved to the University of Wisconsin at Madison as a full professor in the Department of Physics. She has honorary appointments in the departments of Chemistry and Materials Science.

She is a Knight of her native Italy (2001), a fellow of the American Physical Society (APS-DCMP, 2010), and a Radcliffe Fellow (2014-2015). She was chair of the APS Division of Biological Physics (DBIO, 2010-2014), won many national and international awards including: Romnes 2002, Vilas 2006, Hamel 2008, and Chancellor Distinguished Teaching Award 2011 at UW-Madison; The Outstanding Young Persons of the World (TOYP-JCI, 1997), the American Competitiveness and Innovation Award (ACI-NSF, 2008); the Best University Research Award (DOE-BES-Geosciences, 2011), the Science-NSF Visualizations Challenge] (2012).

She teaches Physics in the Arts, for which she wrote a textbook, co-authored by Willy Haeberli and published by Academic Press-Elsevier (2008, 2011) and translated into Chinese (2011).

== Awards ==
- Vilas Distinguished Achievement Professorship, UW-Madison, 2018.
- David A. Shirley Award for Outstanding Scientific Achievement, Advanced Light Source, 2018.
- Radcliffe Fellowship 2014-2015, Harvard University.
- Winner of the 2012 International Science & Engineering Visualization Challenge.
- Chancellor's Distinguished Teaching Award, UW-Madison (6 awards/year, selected among ~2000 professors at UW), January 2011, Award ceremony April 27th, 2011.
- Fellow of the American Physical Society, Division of Condensed Matter Physics (DCMP), November 2010.
- Elected Chair of the Division of Biological Physics, American Physical Society (APS-DBIO), 2010-2014.
- American Competitiveness and Innovation (ACI) fellowship 2008-2010, nominated (without Gilbert knowing about it) by the NSF program officer David Brant, and awarded by the NSF-Division of Materials Research.
- George and Pamela Hamel Faculty Fellow, UW-Madison, 2008-2012.
- Vilas Associate Award, UW-Madison, 2006-2007.
- H. I. Romnes Award, UW-Madison, 2002.
- Cavaliere della Repubblica (Knight of the Italian Republic), appointed by President Carlo Azeglio Ciampi, 2000.
- Gert Rempfer "New Millennium Guiding Light Award" 2000.
- "TOYP" Award (The Outstanding Young Persons of the world) of the Junior Chamber International, Award for Scientific and Technological Development, selected among the winning candidates of 116 countries worldwide, 1997.
- "TOYP Italia" (The Outstanding Young Persons of the world) of the Junior Chamber Italiana, Award for Scientific Development, 1997.
