= Sudha Patel =

Indian blind female sarpanch (born 1976)

Sudha Patel (born 1976) is India’s youngest elected blind female sarpanch. She was elected in June 1995 as the sarpanch of Changa village in Anand district, Gujarat. Patel is the recipient of the prestigious Ten Outstanding Young Persons of World (1997) award, Outstanding Woman Panchayat Leader of India award, and was awarded the Jagdish K Patel Award by the President of India.

== Early life and education ==
Patel was born in a farming family in Changa village of Petlad taluka in Gujarat's Anand district, about 120 km from Ahmedabad. Her father was previously the village sarpanch; both she and her sister have been visually-impaired since birth. She reveals that she is alive today only because a good harvest the year she was born that prevented her parents from infanticide as some villagers thought her to be lucky as Lakshmi, the goddess of wealth.

Patel is the first blind post-graduate in law from the Sardar Patel University in Anand, Gujarat, India. Due to her gender and her disability, she turned heads when she expressed her desire to become the sarpanch, but won elections to become the first woman sarpanch of her village.

== Career ==
Apart from being sarpanch, Patel now works as a project coordinator in a private trust in Anand that works to help children with physical disabilities. She was the honorary general secretary of the Anand branch of the National Association for the Blind and is a member of the Ahmedabad-based Blind People's Association.

As sarpanch, Sudha has focused on infrastructural development, by building borewells and water pumps to tackle water scarcity, and public hospitals conference halls etc. Education has been another priority; several computer-equipped schools for children of workers have been opened during her tenure as sarpanch. Patel has also been instrumental in generating income for the village by renting out lakes to companies. She also started family planning programmes, and mobilised over Indian Rupees 1 million for the development projects she runs.

Patel also runs many programmes for people with disabilities. She has conducted rehabilitation projects in around 85 villages of Petlad taluka, registering around 800 disabled people. Her door-to-door rehabilitation project for blind people and people with mental disabilities has trained parents, children and adults with an educational and rehabilitative approach. She has also taught disabled students under a state-sponsored programme for inclusive education and has admitted over 80 blind children in schools. Patel's work in arranging for writers to assist visually disabled students in writing the annual SSC and HSC exams is widely acclaimed.

Patel, who has made village fitness a personal aim, also teaches yoga to the people of her panchayat.

== Recognition ==
Patel has received national and international recognition for her work. On November 18, 1997, she became the youngest person to win the Young Person of the World, Junior Chamber International Award. That year she also received the Outstanding Young Person of the Nation Award conferred by Junior Chamber International, presented to her by the President of the Philippines. She is a recipient of the Outstanding Woman Panchayat Leader Award from the Institute of Social Sciences, New Delhi, and the Neelam Ranga National Award from the National Association for the Blind.
