= Never Tell Me Never =

1998 film

- Directed by: David Elfick
- Written by: John Cundill; Janine Shepherd
- Produced by: David Elfick; Anne Bruning
- Starring: Claudia Karvan; Michael Caton; Diane Craig
- Cinematography: Martin McGrath
- Edited by: Marcus D'Arcy
- Music by: Peter Kaldor
- Release date: 1998
- Running time: 95 minutes
- Country: Australia
- Language: English

Never Tell Me Never is a 1998 Australian biopic TV film about cross-country skier Janine Shepherd.

== Plot ==
Following the road to recovery of cross-country skier Janine Shepherd after she was hit by a car.

== Cast ==
- Claudia Karvan as Janine Shepherd
- Michael Caton as Max Shepherd
- Diane Craig as Shirley Shepherd
- John Howard as Uncle Darryl
- Paul Bishop as Scott
- Malcolm Kennard as Tim Blake
- Robert Mammone as Dr Adrian Cohen
- Joel Edgerton as Pab
- Justine Clarke as Anna
- Mouche Phillips as Meredith
- Gosia Dobrowolska as Nurse Anne
- Harold Hopkins as Neville
- Carole Skinner as Dusty
- Tina Bursill as Virginia
- Bill Young as Noel
- Peta Toppano as M.C
- Jason Chong as Jason
- Rachel Gordon as Angela
- Justin Monjo as Marty Hall
- Geoff Morrell as Rehab Specialist

== Production ==
The movie, made hoping for a cinema release, was filmed over an eight-week shoot with Karvan at times wearing Shepherd's own clothes. Screenwriter John Cundill worked closely with Shepherd's on the script.

== Reception ==
Never Tell Me Never won its time slot in the ratings, beating out French Kiss, Our Mutual Friend and Under Siege 2.

Andrew L. Urban of Urban Cinefile wrote " I can't say how accurate the details are, nor how well the film captures the essence of the characters, but seen as a stand alone drama it is effective in every department." The Sun-Herald's Rachel Browne gave it 5 stars finishing "This telemovie has strong family appeal with laughter, tears, romance and aerobatic stunts."

== Awards ==
- 1998 AFI Awards
  - Best Mini-Series or Telefeature - nominated
  - Best Actress in a Leading Role in a Television Drama - Claudia Karvan - nominated
- 1999 Logie Awards
  - Most Outstanding Actress - Claudia Karvan - nominated
