= Spirit of London (disambiguation) =

Spirit of London may refer to:

- A Alexander Dennis Enviro400 type London bus, named Spirit of London, which replaced the vehicle destroyed on 7 July 2005 by a terrorist bomb.
- A cruise liner constructed by Cantieri Navali del Tirreno & Riuniti, named Spirit of London, launched in 1972 and subsequently renamed MV Ocean Dream.
- An annual award ceremony launched in 2009 by the Damilola Taylor Trust, named Spirit of London Awards, intended to encourage talented young people.
