= List of recipients of Ten Outstanding Young Persons of the World =

The JCI Ten Outstanding Young Persons of the World, usually JCI TOYP, program serves to formally recognize young people who excel in their chosen fields and exemplify the best attributes of the world's young people. The program is sponsored by Junior Chamber International (JCI). JCI selects 10 outstanding young people under 40 who live the JCI Mission in extraordinary ways.

It was founded by the 1983 JCI World President Kjell Peterson and first introduced at the 1983 JCI World Congress in Taipei.

== Honorees ==
=== 1980s ===
==== 1983 ====
Mr. Félix Sánchez	United States	Scientific and/or Technological Development	1983
Mr. Gunter Pauli	Belgium	Business, Economic and/or Entrepreneurial Accomplishments	1983
Mr. Lin Hwai-min	Taiwan	Cultural Achievement	1983
Mr. Luis Carlos Galan	Colombia	Political, Legal and/or Governmental Affairs	1983
Mr. Luke Hingson	United States	Humanitarian and/or Voluntary Leadership	1983
Mr. Ping-Wing Pao	Hong Kong	Humanitarian and/or Voluntary Leadership	1983
Mr. Roland Arriola	United States	Political, Legal and/or Governmental Affairs	1983
Mr. Senaka Senanayake	Sri Lanka	Cultural Achievement	1983
Mr. Shrikant Jichkar	India	Political, Legal and/or Governmental Affairs	1983
Mr. Stan Chen Shih	Taiwan	Scientific and/or Technological Development	1983

==== 1984 ====
Mr. Chien Yih-Lin	Taiwan	Scientific and/or Technological Development	1984
Ms. Doreen Leung Dor-Ling	Hong Kong	Cultural Achievement	1984
Mr. Jarrold Petrofsky	United States	Medical Innovation	1984
Mr. Jose Laurel V.	Philippines	Political, Legal and/or Governmental Affairs	1984
Mr. Lloyd Fourmile	Australia	Political, Legal and/or Governmental Affairs	1984
Mr. Michael Waldock	Australia	Political, Legal and/or Governmental Affairs	1984
Mr. William Rote	United States	Humanitarian and/or Voluntary Leadership	1984

==== 1985 ====
Mr. Andre Viger	Canada	Humanitarian and/or Voluntary Leadership	1985
Mr. Eugene You-Hsin Chien	England	Business, Economic and/or Entrepreneurial Accomplishments	1985
Mr. James Shepherd	United States	Humanitarian and/or Voluntary Leadership	1985
Mr. Manuel Patarroyo-Murillo	Colombia	Scientific and/or Technological Development	1985
Mr. Melchior Wathelet	Belgium	Political, Legal and/or Governmental Affairs	1985
Mr. Steve Tebogo Kekana	South Africa	Cultural Achievement	1985
Ms. Wai-Yin Tsang	Hong Kong	Cultural Achievement	1985

==== 1986 ====
Mr. Aburizal Bakrie	Indonesia	Business, Economic and/or Entrepreneurial Accomplishments	1986
Mr. Charles T. Murr	Mexico	Moral and/or Environmental Leadership	1986
Mr. Eddy Yeung	Mauritius	Personal Improvement and/or Accomplishment	1986
Mr. Masonori Fukushima	Japan	Scientific and/or Technological Development	1986
Mr. Michele Detaille	Belgium	Political, Legal and/or Governmental Affairs	1986
Ms. Nadine Strossen	United States	Political, Legal and/or Governmental Affairs	1986
Mr. Richard Crane	England	Moral and/or Environmental Leadership	1986

==== 1987 ====
Mr. Facundo Suarez-Lastra	Argentina	Political, Legal and/or Governmental Affairs	1987
Ms. Kathryn Sullivan	United States	Scientific and/or Technological Development	1987
Mr. Mohammad Haque	Bangladesh	Humanitarian and/or Voluntary Leadership	1987
Mr. Ray Perryman	United States	Business, Economic and/or Entrepreneurial Accomplishments	1987
Mr. Rick Hansen	Canada	Personal Improvement and/or Accomplishment	1987
Mr. Ruben Enrique Poma Rojas	Bolivia	Cultural Achievement	1987
Mr. Seto Mulyadi	Indonesia	Contribution to Children, World Peace and/or Human Rights	1987
Mr. Stephen Carter	United States	Academic Leadership and/or Accomplishment	1987
Ms. Susan Clasohm	Australia	Moral and/or Environmental Leadership	1987

==== 1988 ====
Mr. David Turbay-Turbay	Colombia	Political, Legal and/or Governmental Affairs	1988
Mr. Douglas Heir	United States	Personal Improvement and/or Accomplishment	1988
Mr. Erol User	Turkey	Contribution to Children, World Peace and/or Human Rights	1988
Mr. Gary Smith	United States	Medical Innovation	1988
Mr. Jackie Chan	Hong Kong	Cultural Achievement	1988
Mr. John Anthony, Jr.	United States	Academic Leadership and/or Accomplishment	1988
Mr. Marty Gauvin	Australia	Scientific and/or Technological Development	1988
Mr. Ray Ekpu	Nigeria	Moral and/or Environmental Leadership	1988
Ms. Simin Jan	Pakistan	Humanitarian and/or Voluntary Leadership	1988
Mr. Thierry Breton	France	Business, Economic and/or Entrepreneurial Accomplishments	1988

==== 1989 ====
Ms. Adelina Ines Dalesio de Viola	Argentina	Political, Legal and/or Governmental Affairs	1989
Ms. Evelyn Glennie	England	Personal Improvement and/or Accomplishment	1989
Mr. Gene Eidelman	United States	Business, Economic and/or Entrepreneurial Accomplishments	1989
Mr. Gerald Kilian	United States	Moral and/or Environmental Leadership	1989
Ms. Jeana Yeager	United States	Scientific and/or Technological Development	1989
Mr. Louis Agnese	United States	Academic Leadership and/or Accomplishment	1989
Mr. Peter Dalglish	Canada	Humanitarian and/or Voluntary Leadership	1989
Mr. Ronald Solar	United States	Medical Innovation	1989
Mr. William Fauré	South Africa	Cultural Achievement	1989
Mr. Garsett Larosse	Belgium	Business, Economic and/or Entrepreneurial Accomplishments	1989

=== 1990s ===
==== 1990 ====
Mr. Anthony Matheus de Oliveira	Brazil	Political, Legal and/or Governmental Affairs	1990
Ms. Cynthia-Ann Gettinger	United States	Personal Improvement and/or Accomplishment	1990
Mr. David Irwin	England	Business, Economic and/or Entrepreneurial Accomplishments	1990
Mr. Jaime Eduardo Jaramillo E.	Colombia	Contribution to Children, World Peace and/or Human Rights	1990
Ms. Jannike Petrovska	United States	Medical Innovation	1990
Ms. Maria Paredes-Acevedo	Ecuador	Humanitarian and/or Voluntary Leadership	1990
Mr. Mario Garcia, Jr.	United States	Moral and/or Environmental Leadership	1990
Ms. Norie Ohga	Japan	Contribution to Children, World Peace and/or Human Rights	1990
Mr. Pertti Huuskonen	Finland	Scientific and/or Technological Development	1990
Mr. Pradeep Kumar Srivastava	India	Academic Leadership and/or Accomplishment	1990
Ms. Yoko Matsuo	Japan	Cultural Achievement	1990
Ms. Vera Alpar	Hungary	Charity and Humanitarian Activity	1990

==== 1991 ====
Mr. Alejandro Colanzi-Zeballos	Bolivia	Political, Legal and/or Governmental Affairs	1991
Mr. Alvaro Manzano Montero	Ecuador	Cultural Achievement	1991
Mr. Ansar Burney	Pakistan	Humanitarian and/or Voluntary Leadership	1991
Ms. Deborah McKeithan	United States	Contribution to Children, World Peace and/or Human Rights	1991
Mr. James Chapman	South Africa	Business, Economic and/or Entrepreneurial Accomplishments	1991
Mr. Joel Bresser	United States	Scientific and/or Technological Development	1991
Mr. Martin Rosen	South Africa	Moral and/or Environmental Leadership	1991
Mr. Pekka Hietala	France	Academic Leadership and/or Accomplishment	1991
Mr. Ruben Luna	Colombia	Medical Innovation	1991
Ms. Una Burke	Ireland	Personal Improvement and/or Accomplishment	1991

==== 1992 ====
Ms. Blanca Lomeli	Mexico	Contribution to Children, World Peace and/or Human Rights	1992
Mr. Erik Hie Kui Lee	Malaysia	Academic Leadership and/or Accomplishment	1992
Mr. Esko Aho	Finland	Political, Legal and/or Governmental Affairs	1992
Ms. Ibis Collado Castillo	Panama	Personal Improvement and/or Accomplishment	1992
Mr. Joseph Young	Ireland	Moral and/or Environmental Leadership	1992
Mr. Jukka Salonen	Finland	Medical Innovation	1992
Mr. Kanubhai Tailor	India	Humanitarian and/or Voluntary Leadership	1992
Mr. Seppo Korpela	Finland	Scientific and/or Technological Development	1992
Mr. Uwe Gill	Germany	Business, Economic and/or Entrepreneurial Accomplishments	1992
Mr. William Hostetler	United States	Cultural Achievement	1992

==== 1993 ====
Ms. Ana Maria Maranon-Lopez	Bolivia	Humanitarian and/or Voluntary Leadership	1993
Mr. Arjava Sharma	India	Scientific and/or Technological Development	1993
Mr. Chris Destoop	Belgium	Moral and/or Environmental Leadership	1993
Mr. David Mata	United States	Medical Innovation	1993
Mr. Edouard Lagourgue	Monaco	Contribution to Children, World Peace and/or Human Rights	1993
Ms. Esther Lim	Malaysia	Personal Improvement and/or Accomplishment	1993
Mr. Jorge Moreno-Ojeda	Colombia	Business, Economic and/or Entrepreneurial Accomplishments	1993
Mr. Mart Laar	Estonia	Political, Legal and/or Governmental Affairs	1993
Mr. Renato Villanueva	Philippines	Cultural Achievement	1993
Mr. Joey Ayala	Philippines	Cultural Achievement	1993
Mr. Uday Bodhankar	India	Academic Leadership and/or Accomplishment	1993

==== 1994 ====
Mr. Christopher Hon-Fai Mak	Hong Kong	Humanitarian and/or Voluntary Leadership	1994
Mr. David Pelzer	United States	Personal Improvement and/or Accomplishment	1994
Mr. Jean-Paul Beaufays	Belgium	Academic Leadership and/or Accomplishment	1994
Mr. Jesse Robredo	Philippines	Political, Legal and/or Governmental Affairs	1994
Mr. Juan Naranjo-Uribe	Colombia	Medical Innovation	1994
Ms. Marie-France Botte	Belgium	Moral and/or Environmental Leadership	1994
Mr. Nicolas Deocampo	Philippines	Cultural Achievement	1994
Mr. Reuben Jih-Ru Hwu	Taiwan	Scientific and/or Technological Development	1994
Mr. Shirish Soni	South Africa	Business, Economic and/or Entrepreneurial Accomplishments	1994
Ms. Zia Ahmed Awan	Pakistan	Contribution to Children, World Peace and/or Human Rights	1994

==== 1995 ====
Dr. Anu Suomalainen Wartiovaara	Finland	Scientific and/or Technological Development	1995
Mr. Carlos Fitzgerald	Panama	Cultural Achievement	1995
Ms. Charlene Ann Hewat	Zimbabwe	Moral and/or Environmental Leadership	1995
Mr. Dennis S. C. Lam	Hong Kong	Academic Leadership and/or Accomplishment	1995
Ms. Feny de los Angeles-Bautista	Philippines	Contribution to Children, World Peace and/or Human Rights	1995
Ms. Hilde Van Dixhoorn	Belgium	Personal Improvement and/or Accomplishment	1995
Dr. Ishwarprasad Satyana Gilada	India	Humanitarian and/or Voluntary Leadership	1995
Dr. Luis Katz	Panama	Medical Innovation	1995
Mr. Shi Kai Biu	Hong Kong	Business, Economic and/or Entrepreneurial Accomplishments	1995
Mr. Theunis Eloff	South Africa	Political, Legal and/or Governmental Affairs	1995

==== 1996 ====
Mr. Benoît Duchâteau-Arminjon	France	Contribution to Children, World Peace and/or Human Rights	1996
Mr. Carlos Walter Antoni Arzabe A.	Bolivia	Medical Innovation	1996
Mr. Cato Zahl Pedersen	Norway	Personal Improvement and/or Accomplishment	1996
Mr. Chris van Lysebetten	Belgium	Humanitarian and/or Voluntary Leadership	1996
Mr. George Biró	Hungary	Moral and/or Environmental Leadership	1996
Mr. Hubert de Boisredon	France	Business, Economic and/or Entrepreneurial Accomplishments	1996
Mr. Julius Almario Lecciones	Philippines	Academic Leadership and/or Accomplishment	1996
Mr. Lance Bloch	South Africa	Political, Legal and/or Governmental Affairs	1996
Ms. Ming Wei	Taiwan	Cultural Achievement	1996
Ms. Sidi Modupe Osho	Nigeria	Scientific and/or Technological Development	1996

==== 1997 ====
Dr. Anil Madaree	South Africa	Medical Innovation	1997
Mr. Anthony Robbins	United States	Business, Economic and/or Entrepreneurial Accomplishments	1997
Mr. Avinash Dorsatwar	India	Contribution to Children, World Peace and/or Human Rights	1997
Dr. Gelsomina De Stasio	Italy	Scientific and/or Technological Development	1997
Mr. Jukka Sakari Salo	Finland	Academic Leadership and/or Accomplishment	1997
Mrs. Lisa Pacheco Macuja	Philippines	Cultural Achievement	1997
Mr. Oscar Gerardo Montes Barzón	Bolivia	Moral and/or Environmental Leadership	1997
Mr. Rodrigo Rivera Salazar	Colombia	Political, Legal and/or Governmental Affairs	1997
Ms. Sudha Kashibhai Patel	India	Personal Improvement and/or Accomplishment	1997
Dr. William Kian Meng Tan	Singapore	Humanitarian and/or Voluntary Leadership	1997

==== 1998 ====
Mrs. Ana Teresa Bernal Montañez	Colombia	Contribution to Children, World Peace and/or Human Rights	1998
Dr. Arin Namal	Turkey	Humanitarian and/or Voluntary Leadership	1998
Dr. Arturo Pesigan	Philippines	Academic Leadership and/or Accomplishment	1998
Dr. Ashwani Kumar	India	Scientific and/or Technological Development	1998
Mr. Benny Cheung Wai-leung	Hong Kong	Moral and/or Environmental Leadership	1998
Mr. Gervan Lubbe	South Africa	Medical Innovation	1998
Mr. Gregory Brenneman	United States	Business, Economic and/or Entrepreneurial Accomplishments	1998
Mrs. Janine Shepherd	Australia	Personal Improvement and/or Accomplishment	1998
Mr. Miguel Reyes Sánchez	Dominican Republic	Cultural Achievement	1998
Ms. Sophia McColgan	Ireland	Political, Legal and/or Governmental Affairs	1998

==== 1999 ====
Mrs. Alexandra Horsch	Switzerland	Humanitarian and/or Voluntary Leadership	1999
Mr. Butch Jimenez	Philippines	Cultural Achievement	1999
Mr. Harun Güçlüsoy	Turkey	Moral and/or Environmental Leadership	1999
Mr. Hasan Alanyali	Turkey	Scientific and/or Technological Development	1999
Mr. Jacky Cheung Hok-yau	Hong Kong	Personal Improvement and/or Accomplishment	1999
Mr. Jih-Chu Lee	Taiwan	Political, Legal and/or Governmental Affairs	1999
Mr. Luc Lebeau	Belgium	Medical Innovation	1999
Mr. Strive Masiyiwa	Zimbabwe	Business, Economic and/or Entrepreneurial Accomplishments	1999
Mr. Wong Tien Yin	Singapore	Academic Leadership and/or Accomplishment	1999
Mr. Yoshio Handa	Japan	Contribution to Children, World Peace and/or Human Rights	1999

=== 2000s ===
==== 2000 ====
Mrs. Elia Judith Palma Prestan	Panama	Contribution to Children, World Peace and/or Human Rights	2000
Mr. Francesc Maduell Canals	Spain	Medical Innovation	2000
Mr. Kariveppil Rabiya	India	Humanitarian and/or Voluntary Leadership	2000
Mrs. Ligaya Sim Cabal	Philippines	Political, Legal and/or Governmental Affairs	2000
Mr. Linus Torvalds	Finland	Scientific and/or Technological Development	2000
Mr. Marc Steven Maes Buytaert	Belgium	Scientific and/or Technological Development	2000
Mr. Marco Daniel Ayala Soria	Bolivia	Moral and/or Environmental Leadership	2000
Mr. Samuel Sammy Peralta Sosa	Dominican Republic	Personal Improvement and/or Accomplishment	2000
Mrs. Yukie Osa	Japan	Contribution to Children, World Peace and/or Human Rights	2000
Mr. Andy Lau Tak Wah	Hong Kong	Personal Improvement and/or Accomplishment	2000

==== 2001 ====
Dr. Ang Hooi Hoon	Malaysia	Scientific and/or Technological Development	2001
Dr. George Earl Peoples, Jr.	United States	Medical Innovation	2001
Dr. Kadil Monera Sinolinding	Philippines	Humanitarian and/or Voluntary Leadership	2001
Mr. Manuel Estiarte Duocastella	Spain	Academic Leadership and/or Accomplishment	2001
Mrs. Moira Therese Kelly	Australia	Contribution to Children, World Peace and/or Human Rights	2001
Mr. See Too Hoi Siang	Singapore	Cultural Achievement	2001
Mr. Shashank Goel	India	Moral and/or Environmental Leadership	2001
Mr. Timothy James Lawrence	United States	Scientific and/or Technological Development	2001
Mr. Yuk Ming Dennis Lo	Hong Kong	Medical Innovation	2001
Mr. Zomahoun Rufin	Benin	Academic Leadership and/or Accomplishment	2001

==== 2002 ====
Mr. Arturas Zuokas	Lithuania	Political, Legal and/or Governmental Affairs	2002
Ms. Caroline Casey	Ireland	Personal Improvement and/or Accomplishment	2002
Dr. Jennifer Weeks Sekowski	United States	Medical Innovation	2002
Mr. Josiah L. Go	Philippines	Academic Leadership and/or Accomplishment	2002
Ms. Kelly Hill	United States	Moral and/or Environmental Leadership	2002
Dr. Lim Chee Peng	Malaysia	Scientific and/or Technological Development	2002
Mr. Luis Alfonso Arias Aristizabal	Colombia	Political, Legal and/or Governmental Affairs	2002
Ms. Michelle Yeoh	Malaysia	Cultural Achievement	2002
Dr. Sunil Gupta	India	Academic Leadership and/or Accomplishment	2002
Dr. Susan Shwu-Chen Tsay	Taiwan	Scientific and/or Technological Development	2002

==== 2003 ====
Mr. Alan Adams	United States	Humanitarian and/or Voluntary Leadership	2003
Mr. Cyriaque Crosnier Mangeat	France	Moral and/or Environmental Leadership	2003
Mr. Datuk Yeat Sew Chuong	Malaysia	Business, Economic and/or Entrepreneurial Accomplishments	2003
Ms. Gearóidín Burke	Ireland	Academic Leadership and/or Accomplishment	2003
Mr. Kennedy Ho Wong	Hong Kong	Political, Legal and/or Governmental Affairs	2003
Ms. Kristín Hákonardóttir	Iceland	Personal Improvement and/or Accomplishment	2003
Ms. Monica Fernandez Sanchez	Venezuela	Academic Leadership and/or Accomplishment	2003
Mr. Pacifico Escalona Avila	Panama	Political, Legal and/or Governmental Affairs	2003
Mr. Stelios Haji-Ioannou	Britain	Business, Economic and/or Entrepreneurial Accomplishments	2003
Ms. Sun Ho Yeow	Singapore	Moral and/or Environmental Leadership	2003

==== 2004 ====
Dr. Anurag Tandon	India	Medical Innovation	2004
Rev. Ch'ng Joo Beng	Malaysia	Humanitarian and/or Voluntary Leadership	2004
Prof. Francisco M. Bernardo	Philippines	Business, Economic and/or Entrepreneurial Accomplishments	2004
Mr. Hugh Evans	Australia	Humanitarian and/or Voluntary Leadership	2004
Ms. Kelly Chen	Hong Kong	Contribution to Children, World Peace and/or Human Rights	2004
Dr. Koshy Eapen	India	Medical Innovation	2004
Mr. Marcos Prado Troyjo	Brazil	Business, Economic and/or Entrepreneurial Accomplishments	2004
H.M. Queen Rania Al Abdullah II	Jordan	Humanitarian and/or Voluntary Leadership	2004
Mr. Sabelo Sibanda	Zimbabwe	Cultural Achievement	2004
Dr. Takanori Shibata	Japan	Scientific and/or Technological Development	2004

==== 2005 ====
Mr. Alain Capo-Chichi	Benin	Academic Leadership and/or Accomplishment	2005
Mr. Amar Latif	United Kingdom	Business, Economic and/or Entrepreneurial Accomplishments	2005
Mr. David Lega	Sweden	Humanitarian and/or Voluntary Leadership	2005
Dr. Emily Ying Yang Chan	Hong Kong	Humanitarian and/or Voluntary Leadership	2005
Mr. José A. Pargas Ojeda	Puerto Rico	Personal Improvement and/or Accomplishment	2005
Mr. Magnus MacFarlane-Barrow	Scotland	Contribution to Children, World Peace and/or Human Rights	2005
Mr. Matthew Albert	Australia	Contribution to Children, World Peace and/or Human Rights	2005
Ms. Olivia Richmond Giles	Scotland	Humanitarian and/or Voluntary Leadership	2005
Mr. Publio Arjona Diaz	Panama	Personal Improvement and/or Accomplishment	2005
Mr. Tokushi Nakashima	Japan	Scientific and/or Technological Development	2005

==== 2006 ====
Dr. Akseli Eetu Hemminki	Finland	Medical Innovation	2006
Mr. Chung C. To	Hong Kong	Contribution to Children, World Peace and/or Human Rights	2006
Dr. Fatimah Binte Abdul Lateef	Singapore	Humanitarian and/or Voluntary Leadership	2006
Ms. Hayley Westenra	New Zealand	Cultural Achievement	2006
Mr Illac Angelo Ancellotti Diaz	Philippines	Business, Economic and/or Entrepreneurial Accomplishments	2006
Mr. Jayanto Kumar Tapadar	India	Medical Innovation	2006
Mr. Juan Sajid De Leon Imao	Philippines	Personal Improvement and/or Accomplishment	2006
Mr. Jyrki Pekka Emil Linnankivi	Finland	Humanitarian and/or Voluntary Leadership	2006
Ms. Maria Kidney	Ireland	Humanitarian and/or Voluntary Leadership	2006
Mr. René Nielsen	Denmark	Personal Improvement and/or Accomplishment	2006

==== 2007 ====
Mrs. Betty Makoni	Zimbabwe	Humanitarian and/or Voluntary Leadership	2007
Mrs. Bolivia Marañon Vocal	Bolivia	Contribution to Children, World Peace and/or Human Rights	2007
Dr. Derek O'Keeffe	Ireland	Scientific and/or Technological Development	2007
Mr. Glenn Lim	Singapore	Personal Improvement and/or Accomplishment	2007
Prof. Hilmi Volkan Demir	Turkey	Academic Leadership and/or Accomplishment	2007
Dr. Johanna Ivaska	Finland	Medical Innovation	2007
Mr. Lo Chay	France	Humanitarian and/or Voluntary Leadership	2007
Mr. Malamine Koné	Mali	Business, Economic and/or Entrepreneurial Accomplishments	2007
Ms. Sayaka Murata	Japan	Humanitarian and/or Voluntary Leadership	2007
Mr. Tarvi Martens	Estonia	Scientific and/or Technological Development	2007

==== 2008 ====
Mr. Garrett Gravesen	United States	Contribution to Children, World Peace and/or Human Rights
Dr. Lisa E. Hensley	United States	Scientific and/or Technological Development
Mrs. Mayya Assaad	Syria	Contribution to children, world peace, and/or human rights
Dr. Angelin An-Lin Chang	Taiwan	Cultural achievement
Miss Tania Major	Australia	Political, legal and/or governmental affairs
Miss Melissa Moon	New Zealand	Personal improvement and/or accomplishment
Dr. Sam Prince	Australia	Humanitarian and/or voluntary leadership
Dr. Pascal Saffache	France	Moral and/or environmental leadership
Governor Luis Villafuerte Jr.	Philippines	Business, economic, and/or entrepreneurial accomplishment
Mr. Yan Wai Kiu	Hong Kong	Personal improvement and/or accomplishment

==== 2009 ====
Dr. Simona Atzori	Italy	Personal Improvement and/or Accomplishment	2009
Mr. Julian Azzopardi	Malta	Humanitarian and/or Voluntary Leadership	2009
Dr. Rex Adivoso Bernardo	Philippines	Personal Improvement and/or Accomplishment	2009
Dr. Utkan Demirci	Turkey	Medical Innovation	2009
Mr. Jonhson V. Firinga	Madagascar	Humanitarian and/or Voluntary Leadership	2009
Ms. Tuğba Kalafatoğlu	Turkey	Political, Legal and/or Governmental Affairs	2009
Mr. Kitso Masi	Botswana	Personal Improvement and/or Accomplishment	2009
Ms. Leigh Mathews	Australia	Contribution to Children, World Peace and/or Human Rights	2009
Mr. Marko "Signmark" Vuoriheimo	Finland	Cultural Achievement	2009
Mr. Guðjón Már Guðjónsson	Iceland	Business, Economic and/or Entrepreneurial Accomplishments	2009

=== 2010s ===
==== 2010 ====
Ms. Aki Nakaoka	Japan	Humanitarian and/or Voluntary Leadership	2010
Mr. Antti Pentikäinen	Finland	Contribution to Children, World Peace and/or Human Rights	2010
Ms. Emily Cummins	United Kingdom	Business, Economic and/or Entrepreneurial Accomplishments	2010
Dr. Gifty Immanuel	India	Medical Innovation	2010
Dr. Joseph Nkurunziza	Rwanda	Contribution to Children, World Peace and/or Human Rights	2010
Mrs. Maria Ingelsson	Sweden	Political, Legal and/or Governmental Affairs	2010
Ms. Melanie Hennessy	Ireland	Humanitarian and/or Voluntary Leadership	2010
Dr. Mikko Wirén	Finland	Cultural Achievement	2010
Mr. Sabirul Islam	United Kingdom	Business, Economic and/or Entrepreneurial Accomplishments	2010
Mr. Uyapo Ndadi	Botswana	Contribution to Children, World Peace and/or Human Rights	2010

==== 2011 ====
Pablo Orlando	Argentina	Business, Economic and/or Entrepreneurial Accomplishment	2011
Mrs. Marta Fidela Gladys Cruz Cerón	Bolivia	Cultural Achievement	2011
Mr. Meilleur D. Murindabagwi	Rwanda	Personal Improvement and/or Accomplishment	2011
Ms. Dalilah Kalla	Mauritius	Humanitarian and/or Voluntary Leadership	2011
Dr. Miia Karita Kivipelto	Finland	Medical Innovation	2011
Dr. Serge Michel Kodom	Togo	Humanitarian and/or Voluntary Leadership	2011
Ms. Bongiwe Mlangeni	South Africa	Business, Economic and/or Entrepreneurial Accomplishment	2011
Ms. Şafak Pavey	Turkey	Contribution to Children, World Peace and/or Human Rights	2011
Dato Sri' Edmund Santhara Kumar Ramanaidu	Malaysia	Business, Economic and/or Entrepreneurial Accomplishment	2011
Abra Tenu	Togo	Academic Leadership and/or Accomplishment	2011
Mr. Riku-Heikki Virtanen	Finland	Contribution to Children, World Peace and/or Human Rights	2011

==== 2012 ====
Benigno "Bam" Aquino, IV	Philippines	Business, Economic and/or Entrepreneurial Accomplishment	2012
Dr. Quique Bassat	Spain	Medical Innovation	2012
Bobby Kensah	United Kingdom	Political, Legal, and/or Governmental Affairs	2012
Keneilwe Moseki	Botswana	Moral and/or Environmental Leadership	2012
Aisling Neary	Ireland	Humanitarian and/or Voluntary Leadership	2012
Fela Mijoro Razafinjato	Madagascar	Humanitarian and/or Voluntary Leadership	2012
Fathmath Jeehan Saleem	Maldives	Humanitarian and/or Voluntary Leadership	2012
Dr. Edsel Maurice Salvana	Philippines	Humanitarian and/or Voluntary Leadership	2012
Katherine Sparkes	United Kingdom	Moral and/or Environmental Leadership	2012
Rajamanohar	India	Technology Entrepreneurship, Mobile for Development	2012
Tendai Concilia Wenyika	Zimbabwe	Political, Legal, and/or Governmental Affairs	2012

==== 2013 ====
Tülin Akın	Turkey	Business, economic, and/or entrepreneurial accomplishment	2013
Mong Linh Do	Australia	Moral and/or environmental leadership	2013
Fumiya Ito	Japan	Business, economic, and/or entrepreneurial accomplishment	2013
Hasibe Kızıltaş	Turkey	Humanitarian and/or voluntary leadership	2013
Soon Loo	Canada	Business, economic, and/or entrepreneurial accomplishment	2013
John Loughton	United Kingdom	Political, legal, and/or governmental affairs	2013
Nicolas Noguier	France	Contribution to children, world peace, and/or human rights	2013
Dr. Ola Orekunrin	Nigeria	Medical innovation	2013
Kian Hoe Seah	Malaysia	Moral and/or environmental Leadership	2013
Vedant Dharam Seeam	Mauritius	Contribution to children, world peace, and/or human rights	2013

==== 2014 ====
Zaheer Allam	Mauritius	Moral and/or environmental leadership	2014
Bulut Ersavas	Turkey	Business, economic, and/or entrepreneurial accomplishment	2014
Daniel Flynn	Australia	Business, economic, and/or entrepreneurial accomplishment	2014
Dr. Alonzo Gabriel	Philippines	Academic leadership and/or accomplishment	2014
Nicolás García Mayor	Argentina	Contribution to children, world peace, and/or human rights	2014
Poman Lo	Hong Kong	Business, economic, and/or entrepreneurial accomplishment	2014
Darren Lomman	Australia	Scientific and/or technological development	2014
Luvuyo Rani	South Africa	Business, economic, and/or entrepreneurial accomplishment	2014
Ruth Riley	United States	Humanitarian and/or voluntary leadership	2014
Nick Shen Weijun	Singapore	Cultural Achievement	2014

==== 2015 ====
Dr. John van Bockxmeer	Australia	Medical Innovation
David Smolansky Urosa	Venezuela	Political, Legal and/or Governmental Affairs
Dr. Landry Signé	Cameroon	Academic Leadership and/or Accomplishment
Joanne O'Riordan	Ireland	Contribution to Children, World Peace and/or Human Rights
Chisenga Muyoya	Zambia	Business, Economic and/or Entrepreneurial Accomplishments
Sofiya Kalinova	Bulgaria	Humanitarian and/or Voluntary Leadership
Lonick Garius	Haiti	Business, Economic and/or Entrepreneurial Accomplishments
Dr. Michael Feilmeier	United States	Humanitarian and/or Voluntary Leadership
Swati Bondia	India	Business, Economic and/or Entrepreneurial Accomplishments
Ada M. Alvarez Conde	Puerto Rico	Contribution to Children, World Peace and/or Human Rights

==== 2016 ====
Shadi Alalshi		Humanitarian and/or Voluntary Leadership
Dr. Mehmet Z. Baykara	Turkey	Scientific and/or Technological Development
Dr. Canan Dagdeviren	Turkey	Medical Innovation
Prof. Abelardo Apollo I. David, Jr.		Humanitarian and/or Voluntary Leadership
Felix Finkbeiner		Moral and/or Environmental Leadership
Robert Gillies	Australia	Humanitarian and/or Voluntary Leadership
Ciara Judge	Ireland	Scientific and/or Technological Development
Huda Kaakeh		Contribution to children, world peace, and/or human rights
Sinqobile Sichelesile Ndlovu	Zimbabwe	Personal improvement and/or accomplishment
Jean Pier Xavier de Liz	Brazil	Political, Legal, and/or Governmental Affairs

==== 2017 ====
Massa Aboujeib	Syria	Contribution to Children, World Peace and/or Human Rights
Imrana Alhaji Buba	Nigeria	Contribution to Children, World Peace and/or Human Rights
Steven Claeys	Belgium	Business, Economic and/or Entrepreneurial Accomplishments
Dr. Engin Durgun	Turkey	Academic Leadership and/or Accomplishment
Adepeju Opeyemi Jaiyeoba	Nigeria	Medical Innovation
Ahmet Kuzubasli	Turkey	Business, Economic and/or Entrepreneurial Accomplishments
Harry McCann		Business, Economic and/or Entrepreneurial Accomplishments
Anna Rukko	Finland	Humanitarian and/or Voluntary Leadership
Professor Oscar Franklin Barcelona Tan		Political, Legal and/or Governmental Affairs
Darco Vieira Cristiano	Brazil	Humanitarian and/or Voluntary Leadership

==== 2018 ====
Dr. Dima Al-Naeb	Syria	Academic Leadership and/or Accomplishment
Cornel Amariei	Romania	Scientific and/or Technological Development
Ganjavkhlan Chadraabal	Mongolia	Contribution to Children, World Peace and/or Human Rights
Richard Javad Heydarian	Philippines	Political, Legal and/or Governmental Affairs
Melissa Johns	United Kingdom	Contribution to Children, World Peace and/or Human Rights
Kamal Lamichhane	Nepal	Academic Leadership and/or Accomplishment
Dr. Burçin Mutlu-Pakdil	Turkey	Academic Leadership and/or Accomplishment
Ronivin Pagtakhan	Philippines	Humanitarian and/or Voluntary Leadership
Azzam Sheikh Alsouq	Syria	Humanitarian and/or Voluntary Leadership
Jacinta Uramah	Nigeria	Business, Economic and/or Entrepreneurial Accomplishments

==== 2019 ====
Dr. Hala Asslan	Syria	Academic Leadership and/or Accomplishment
Malak Al Akiely	Jordan	Business, Economic and/or Entrepreneurial Accomplishments
Kaspar Korjus	Estonia	Business, Economic and/or Entrepreneurial Accomplishments
Duygu Yılmaz	Turkey	Business, Economic and/or Entrepreneurial Accomplishments
Jose Enrique Arias Chiu	Mexico	Cultural Achievement
Tomoya Onaka	Japan	Humanitarian and/or Voluntary Leadership
Stephanie Woollard	Australia	Humanitarian and/or Voluntary Leadership
Dr. Gözde Durmuş	Turkey	Medical Innovation
Maher Maymoun	Jordan	Moral and/or Environmental Leadership
Anish Mohan	India	Personal Improvement and/or Accomplishment

=== 2020s ===
==== 2020 ====
Wassim Dhaouadi	Tunisia	Academic Leadership and/or Accomplishment
Vahid Rajabloo	Iran	Business, Economic and/or Entrepreneurial Accomplishments
Johana Bahamón Gómez	Colombia	Contribution to Children, World Peace and/or Human Rights
George Marrash	Syria	Contribution to Children, World Peace and/or Human Rights
Melene Cynthia Rossouw	South Africa	Contribution to Children, World Peace and/or Human Rights
Aaron Hannon	Ireland	Medical Innovation
Dr. Jajini Varghese	United Kingdom	Medical Innovation
Akash Chourasiya	India	Moral and/or Environmental Leadership
Mihai Toader-Pasti	Romania	Moral and/or Environmental Leadership
Aboudou Walid Agro	Benin	Personal Improvement and/or Accomplishment

==== 2021 ====
Chadi Khatib	Syria	Medical Innovation
Chee Sian Kuan	Malaysia	Medical Innovation
Christopher Arida	Lebanon	Business, Economic and/or Entrepreneurial Accomplishments
Edmund Heng	Malaysia	Personal Improvement and/or Accomplishment
Hansley Noruthun	Mauritius	Scientific and/or Technological Development
Jennifer Canaveral	Colombia	Personal Improvement and/or Accomplishment
Saleem Najjar	Syria	Business, Economic and/or Entrepreneurial Accomplishments
Sinead Kane	Ireland	Personal Improvement and/or Accomplishment
Srikanth Bolla	India	Personal Improvement and/or Accomplishment
Temie Giwa-Tubosun	Nigeria	Business, Economic and/or Entrepreneurial Accomplishments

==== 2022 ====
Laura Koivusalo	Finland	Medical Innovation
Ricky Chiu	Hong Kong	Medical Innovation
Sin Wei Lun	Malaysia	Medical Innovation
Elma Akob	South Africa	Personal Improvement and/or Accomplishment
Kerem Deveci	Turkey	Scientific and/or Technological Development
Fırat Güder	Turkey	Scientific and/or Technological Development
Sai Seong Lim	Malaysia	Scientific and/or Technological Development
Amir Fehri	Tunisia	Academic Leadership and/or Accomplishment
Dania Humaidan	Syria	Academic Leadership and/or Accomplishment
Zakithi Mkhize	South Africa	Academic Leadership and/or Accomplishment

==== 2023 ====
Selçuk Yusuf Arslan	Turkey	Moral and/or Environmental Leadership
Saul Castañeda Hernandez	Mexico	Medical Innovation
Joanne Ascencion Valdez	Philippines	Humanitarian and/or Voluntary Leadership
Khaw Juan Shong	Malaysia	Medical Innovation
Uğur Tanrıverdi	Turkey	Medical Innovation
Ainsley Tiew Lee Sin	Malaysia	Contribution To Children, World Peace and/or Human Rights
Meriam Mastour	Tunisia	Contribution To Children, World Peace and/or Human Rights
Mohamed Issam Mahho	Syria	Personal Improvement and/or Accomplishment
Pinky Ketswaretswe Mpho Leah Junior Mokwena	South Africa	Scientific and/or Technological Development
Neelakantha Bhanu Prakash	India	Personal Improvement and/or Accomplishment

==== 2024 ====
Marcel Van Hattem	Brazil	Political, Legal and/or Governmental Affairs
Barkaoui Salma	Tunisia	Scientific and/or Technological Development
Risa Santoso	Indonesia	Academic Leadership and/or Accomplishment
Giovanna Estefania Ramirez Ruiz	Colombia	Academic Leadership and/or Accomplishment
Şükrü Furkan Öztürk	Turkey	Scientific and/or Technological Development
Zülal Tannur	Turkey	Personal Improvement and/or Accomplishment
Mouhamad Kawas	Syria	Business, Economic and/or Entrepreneurial Accomplishment
Valentina Milanova	Bulgaria	Medical Innovation
Lai Chin Wei	Malaysia	Academic Leadership and/or Accomplishment
Aydın Sinan Apaydın	Turkey	Medical Innovation

==== 2025 ====
Ifedayo Hadijat Durosinmi-Etti	Nigeria	Business, Economic and/or Entrepreneurial Accomplishment
Dr. Abdulkarim Ekzayez	Syria	Medical Innovation
Dr. Sana Amairi-Pyka	Tunisia	Scientific and/or Technological Development
Asma Mansour	Tunisia	Business, Economic and/or Entrepreneurial Accomplishment
Dr. Wilson Wai-Yin Cheung	Hong Kong	Academic Leadership and/or Accomplishment
Kent Ng Kun Kwan	Malaysia	Cultural achievement
Dr. Eisuke Shimizu	Japan	Medical Innovation
Jose Gabriel Mejia	Philippines	Cultural achievement
Atakan Karatas	Turkiye	Political, Legal and/or Governmental Affairs
Zerrin Temiz	Turkiye	Personal Improvement and/or Accomplishment

==== 2026 ====
Tatsuro Hoshino	Japan	Contribution To Children, World Peace and/or Human Rights
Summer Okibe	Nigeria	Contribution To Children, World Peace and/or Human Rights
Michelle Tiong	Malaysia	Academic Leadership and/or Accomplishment
Yassine Belghith	Tunisia	Medical innovation
Emna Mizouni	Tunisia	Cultural achievement
Linda Estrella del Mar Montilla-Celis	Venezuela	Academic Leadership and/or Accomplishment
Ehab Badwi	Syria	Contribution To Children, World Peace and/or Human Rights
Khadija Maalej	Tunisia	Contribution To Children, World Peace and/or Human Rights
Kenneth Smith	United States	Scientific and/or Technological Development
Muzoon Rakan al mellehan	Syria	Contribution To Children, World Peace and/or Human Rights
