= Nicolás García Mayor =

Argentine designer (born 1978)

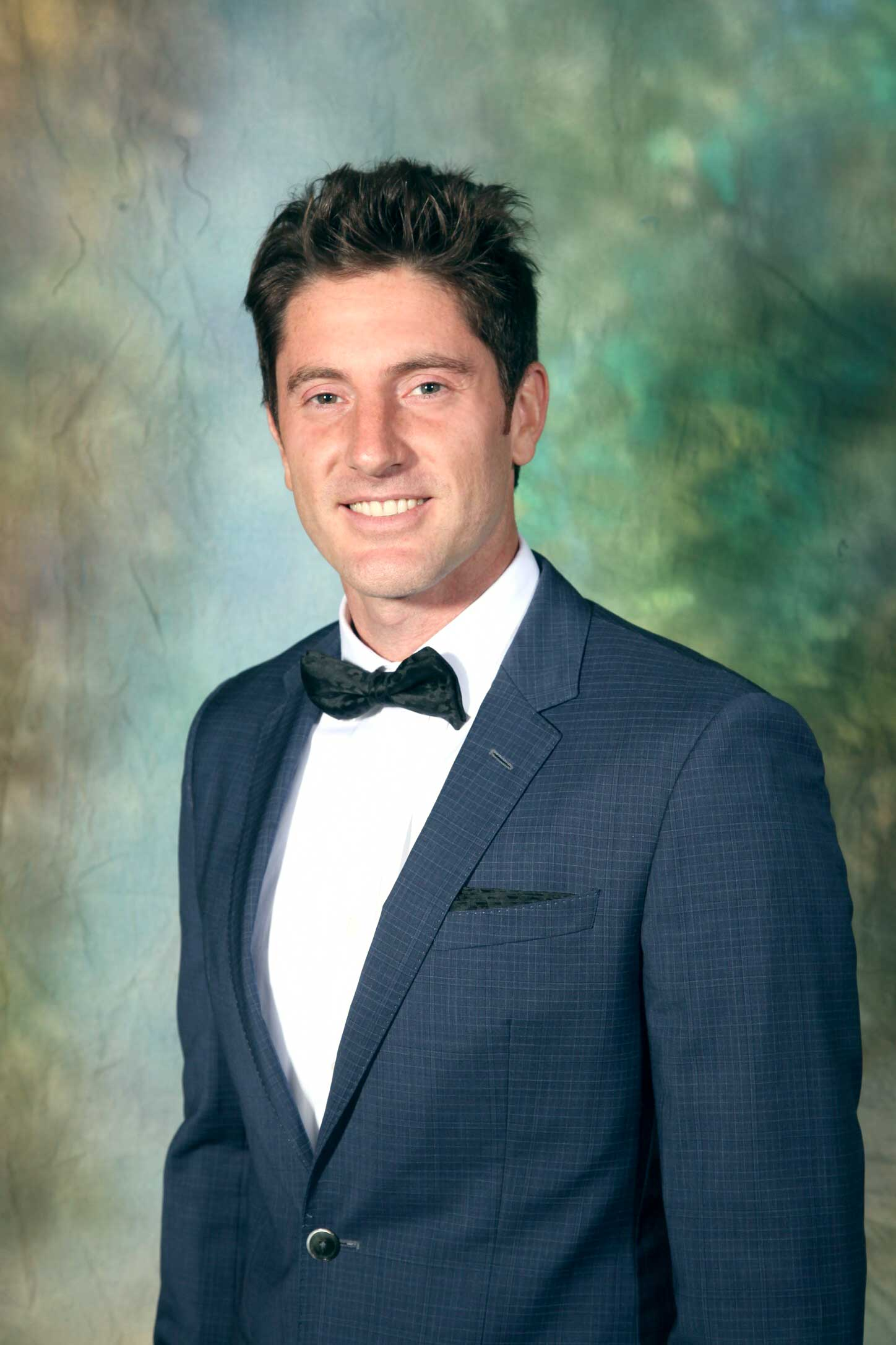
- Nicolás García Mayor at IADB/Washington
- Born: December 15, 1978 (age 47); Bahía Blanca, Argentina
- Education: National University of La Plata Stanford University
- Occupations: Entrepreneur, Social Innovator, Humanitarian Industrial Designer
- Parent(s): Olga Noemi Mayor, Carlos Raul Garcia
- Awards: The Outstanding Young Person of the World TOYP
- Website: nicogarciamayor.org

Nicolás García Mayor (born December 15, 1978) is an Argentine entrepreneur and industrial designer focused in humanitarian development. He is the CEO of Cmax System INC and other Corp's and NGO's. He worked and lived in Europe conducting various architectural and innovation design projects. Since 2000 he has been working as an Industrial Humanitarian Designer, identifying, designing, developing and implementing innovative solutions in countries in South America and abroad, including China, Austria, Spain, France, United Arab Emirates.

In 2014 he was awarded by JCI with Ten Outstanding Young Person of the World TOYP for his contribution to children, world peace and human rights and was invited to present his humanitarian innovation called Cmax System in the 68th the United Nations General Assembly UN, in New York City. He was also invited to Vatican City by Pope Francis, who blessed his project for the humanitarian work refugees. The Government of Argentina honored him with one of the country’s highest awards “Ambassador of Argentina Country Brand” and the Senate of the Argentina Nation bestowed the award for “The Latin America Development Leadership”. In 2016, the US Government gave permanent residency status citing “Extraordinary Ability” and “Brilliant Talent”. As a social entrepreneur, he has given multiple TED (conference) around the globe and has worked as an innovation consultant for international organizations such as the United Nations (UN), the Inter-American Development Bank, universities worldwide, national and local governments and NGOs. Nicolas has been a Jury of Honor of Balseiro Institute and the National Atomic Energy Commission of Argentina. Garcia Mayor has also consulted as a researcher on humanitarian needs, assessments and mitigation for Médecins Sans Frontières (MSF) International, National Scientific and Technical Research Council in Argentina, Masdar Institute in Abu Dhabi, Nigeria Future Energy Group NIFEG, Salzburg Seminar in Austria. He was also selected by consultant Marcus Evans to join the World Industrial Design Summit in Cannes and Berlin as a consultant to leaders such as BMW, Audi, Coca-Cola, Google and Facebook among other companies.

- Founder of 5 companies
- Co-Founder and President of 8 NGOs and social benefit organizations
- Designer and developer of over 200 innovative products

== Biography ==
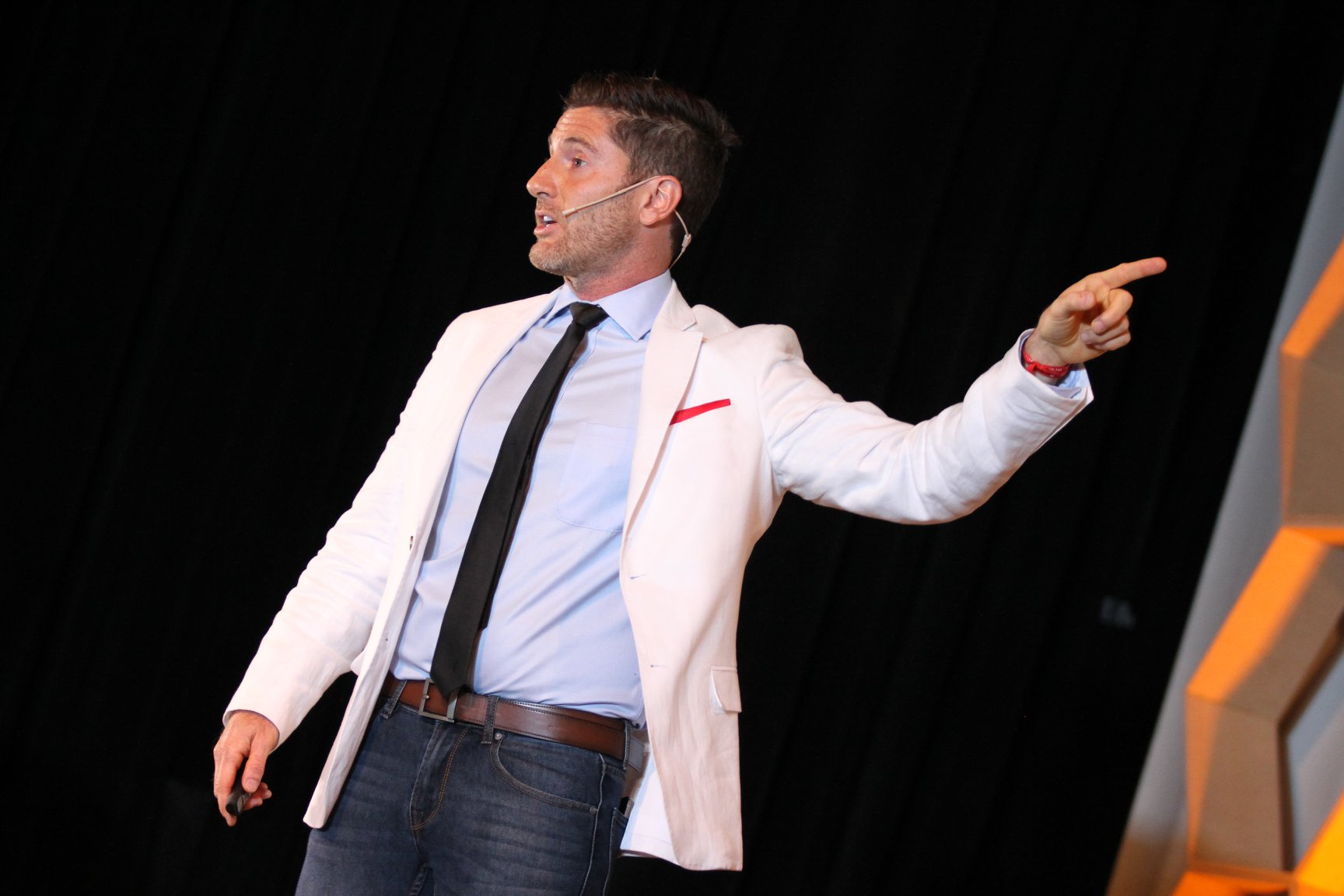
Nicolas Garcia Mayor Keynote Sustainable Brands

Nicolas Garcia Mayor was born in Bahia Blanca (south of the province of Buenos Aires, Argentina). After obtaining his degree in Computer Technology, he moved to La Plata and graduated in Industrial Design at the National University of La Plata, Faculty of Fine Arts, for a postgraduate later in EcoDesign. In 2000 he founded an industrial design company dedicated to solve design problems and develop new and innovative projects through interdisciplinary methods. As part of his final thesis in 2001, he developed a system of emergency housing shelters for refugees and displaced people by natural disasters and armed conflicts, called the Cmax System. After graduating as an industrial designer in 2003, he moved to Tarragona, Spain where he designed and developed new products and architectural works for different companies and government bodies. He also founded a start-up company called CATARGE with his older brother Sebastian to design homes and commercial construction projects. In 2004, he returned to Argentina and reopened ar estudio, created a new design space and completed work for international companies including Cargill, Petrobras, YPF, Dow Chemical, Government of Portugal, Government of Brasil, and Security Ministries of Buenos Aires, among others. He designed the first criminalistics mobile laboratory to enable the Scientific Police to process crime scenes with equipment on board, among other projects to Ministry of Security of the Province of Buenos Aires in Argentina. In 2009, Garcia Mayor was founder and chairman of the Department of Young Entrepreneurs of the Industrial Union of Bahía Blanca, a supportive space for young entrepreneurs in the region. In 2016, in Washington DC, close to the White House, Garcia Mayor opened the headquarters of Cmax System Inc. a [Public Benefit-Corporation] (B CORP) dedicated to building an immediate urbanization for displaced and refugee people. In the same year he started the Cmax Foundation with the focus of donating temporary shelters and rebuilding homes, schools, hospitals, to assist people affected by natural disasters or armed conflicts.

He has designed and developed different projects, including a bottle opener, a hotel in Tarragona, a high-speed train in China, a tourist information booth, electric vehicle for poor sectors(TATO), up to a Race Car for Rally DAKAR.

As a social entrepreneur, he created and designed many humanitarian projects in Argentina, Colombia, Paraguay and Guatemala. From 3D-printed prosthetic hands and arms to child malnutrition centers and a home for the vulnerable elderly. He has co-founded several NGOs and social benefit organizations:

- Fundacionar: Promoting a change in the world through humanitarian and social innovation
- Cmax Foundation
- GOIN: Group of Integrative Oncology
- RSE UIBB: Corporate Social Responsibility Department of Industrial Union
- DJE UIBB: Young Entrepreneur Department of Industrial Union
- CEPDIN: Child malnutrition center
- NATAN: Home for the vulnerable elderly
- Una Ilusión: Multi-disciplinary center for Child Development

== Products Design Works ==
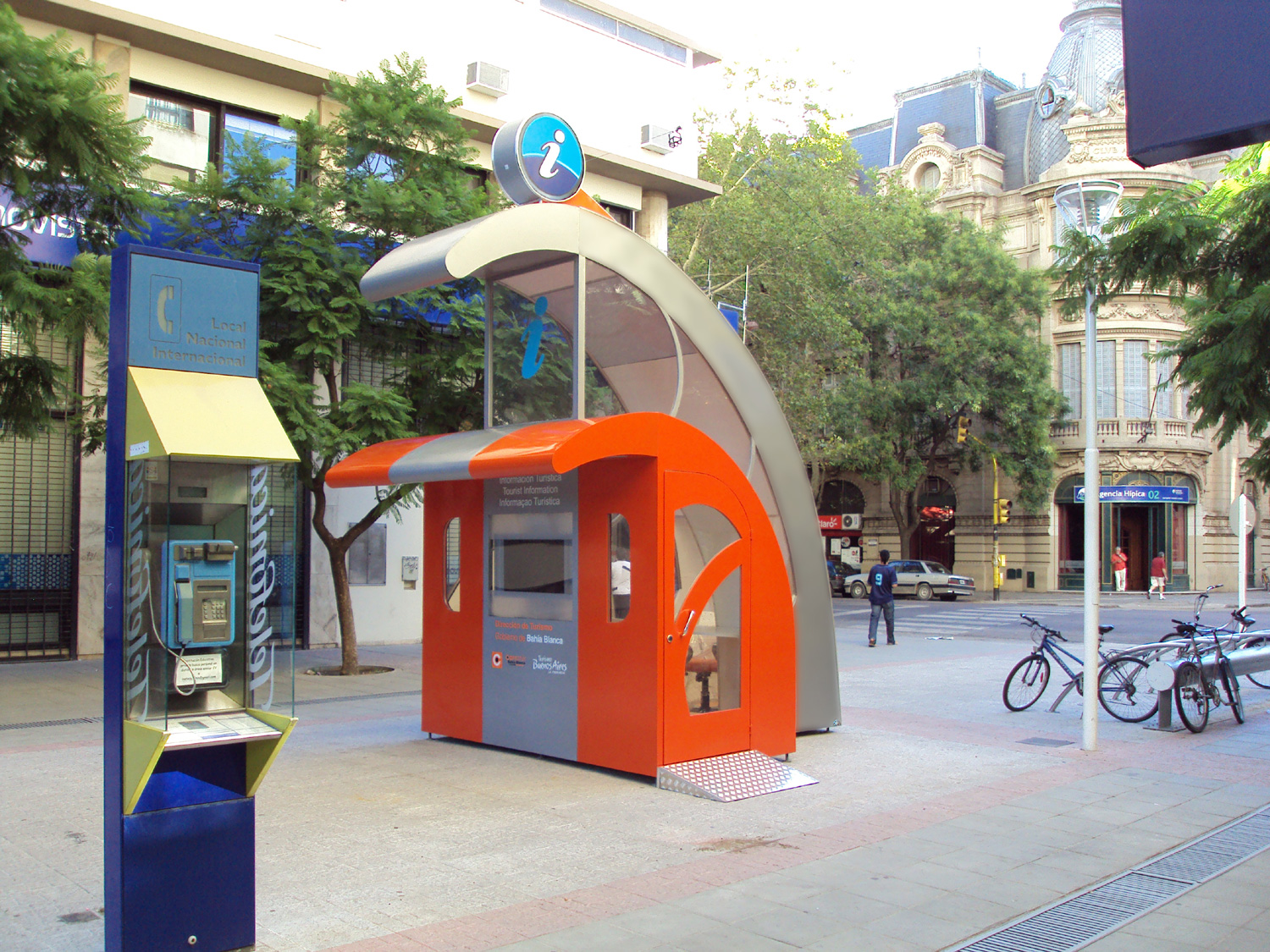
Tourist information booth designed by Nicolás García Mayor

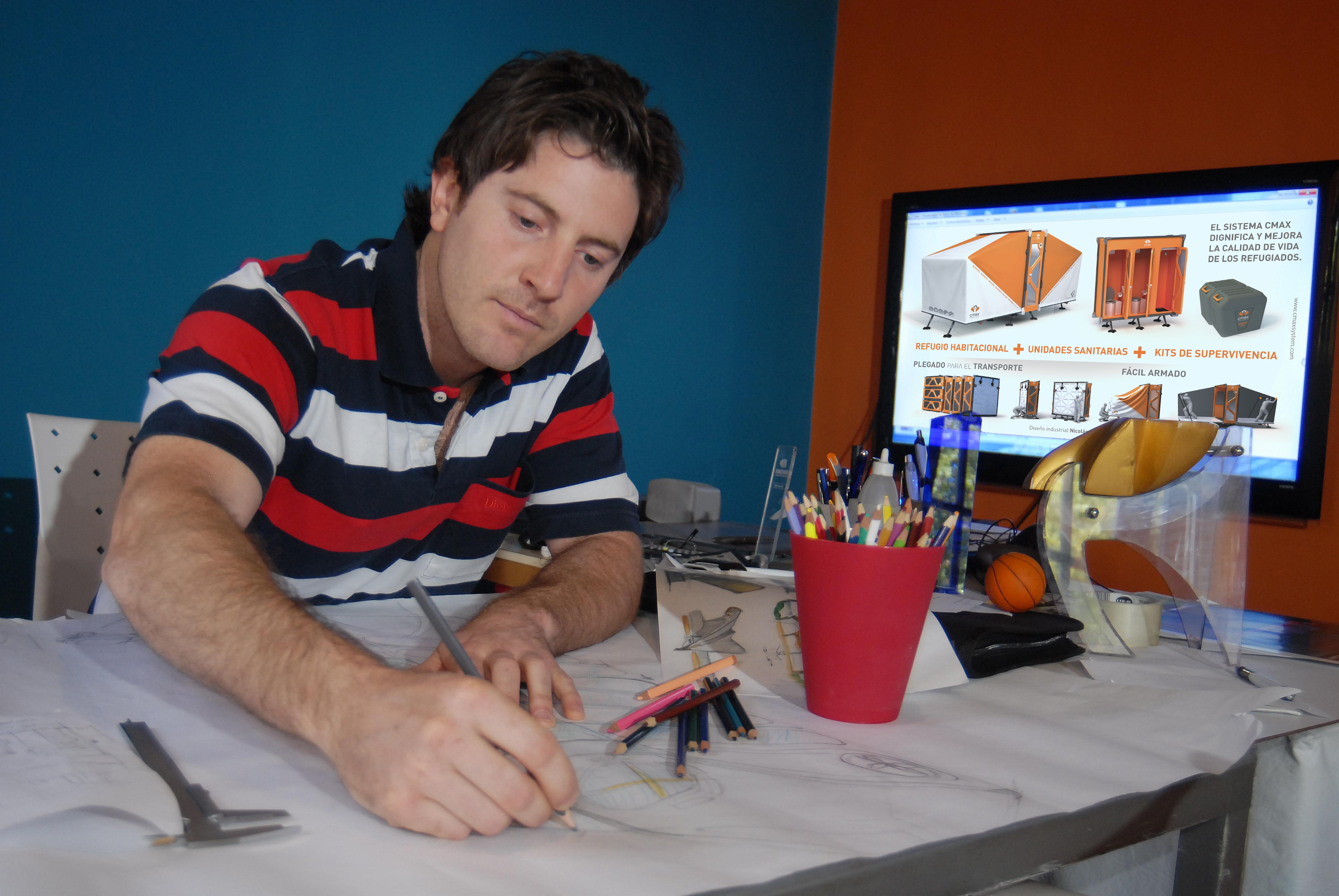
Nicolas Garcia Mayor Industrial Designer

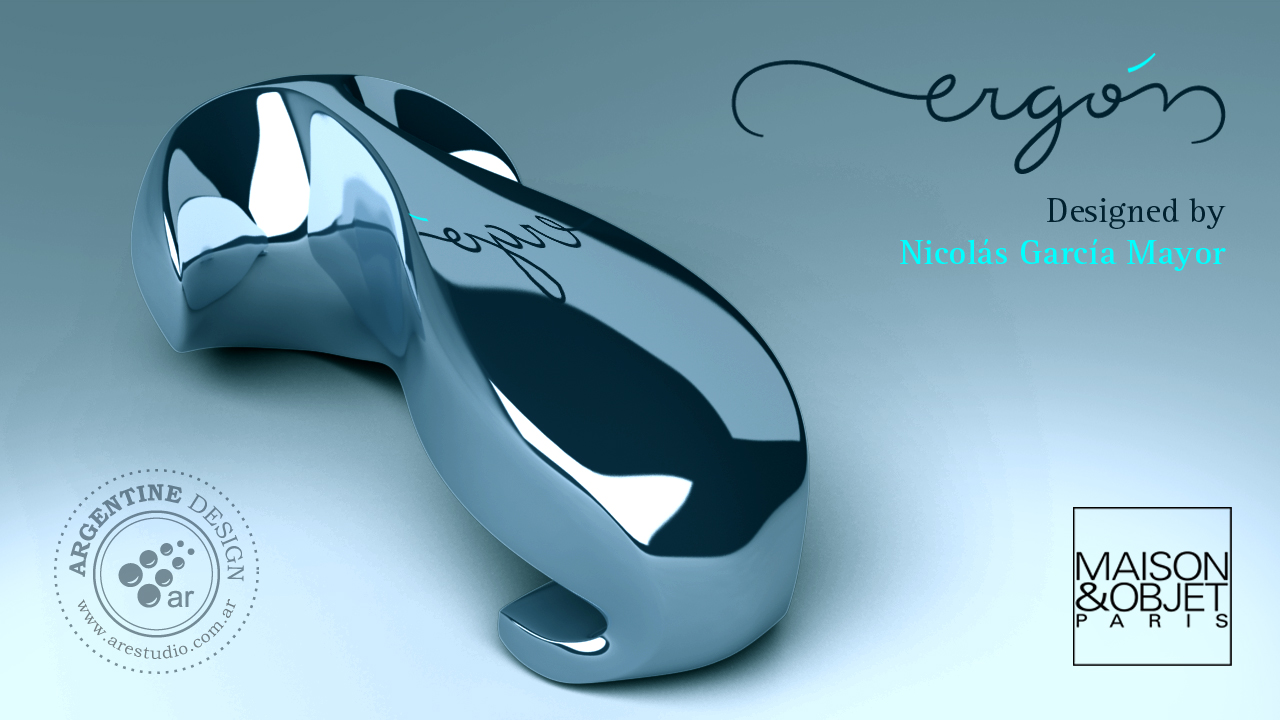

== Humanitarian works ==
- Founder Social Innovation Lab for Emergency LISE With the University of Monterrey
- Co-Founder ARISE Mexico agreement to prevent disasters
- CEPDIN: Child malnutrition center
- NATAN: Home for the vulnerable elderly
- Una Ilusión: Multi-disciplinary center for Child Development
- Fundacionar: Promoting a change in the world through humanitarian and social innovation
- Cmax Foundation: Improving the quality of life of displaced people by natural disasters and wars
- GOIN: Group of Integrative Oncology
- RSE UIBB: Corporate Social Responsibility Department of Industrial Union
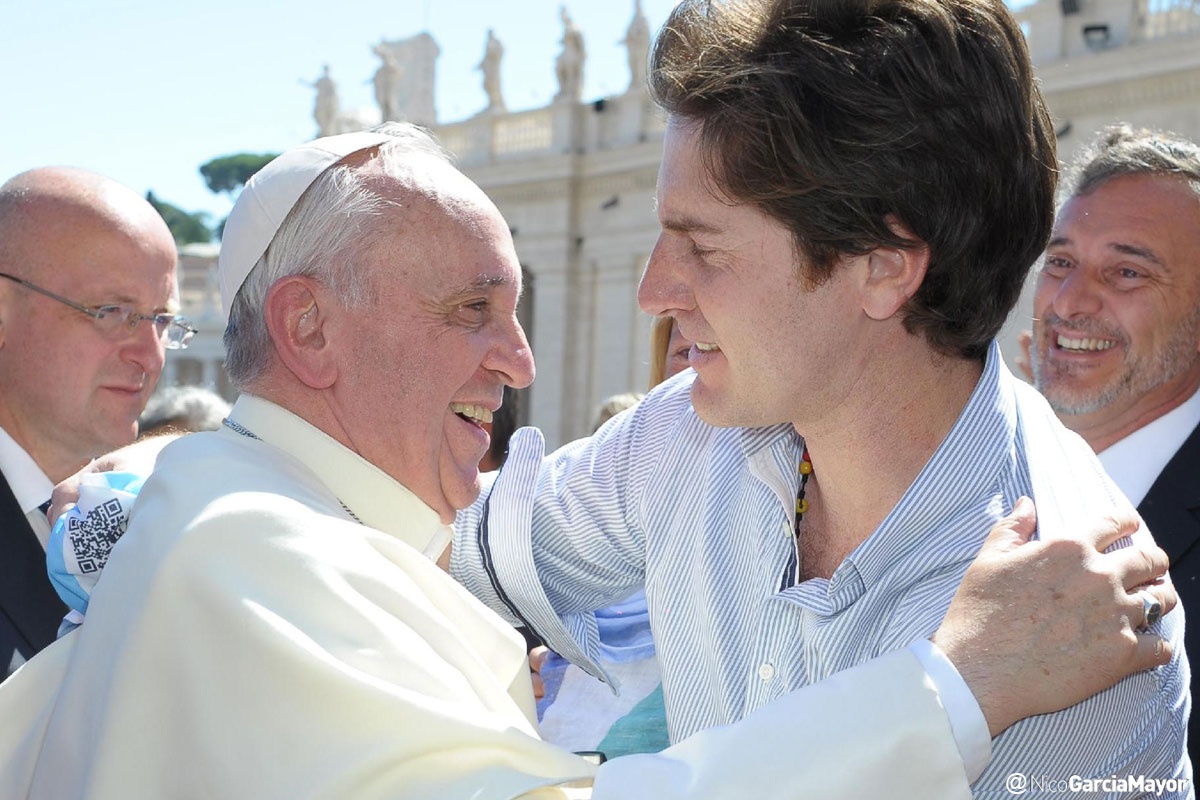
Nicolas Garcia Mayor with Pope Francis in the Vatican

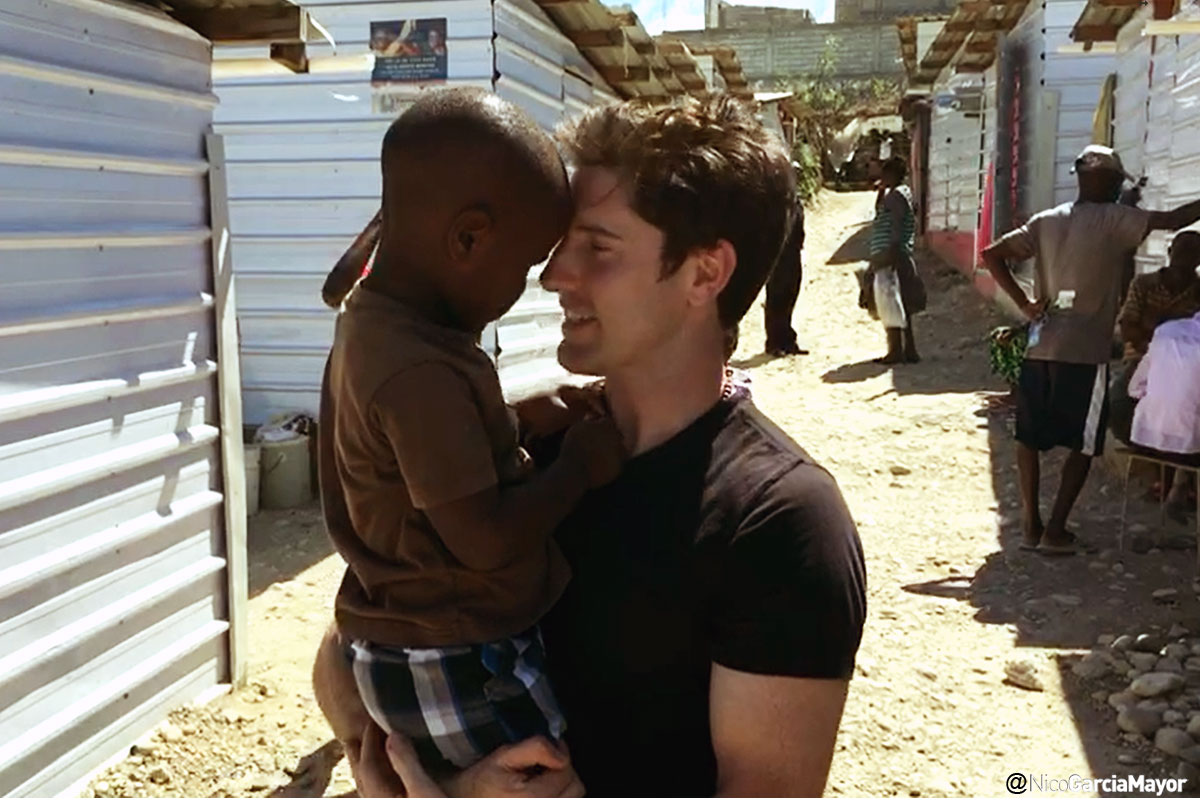
Nicolas Garcia Mayor in Haiti port au prince

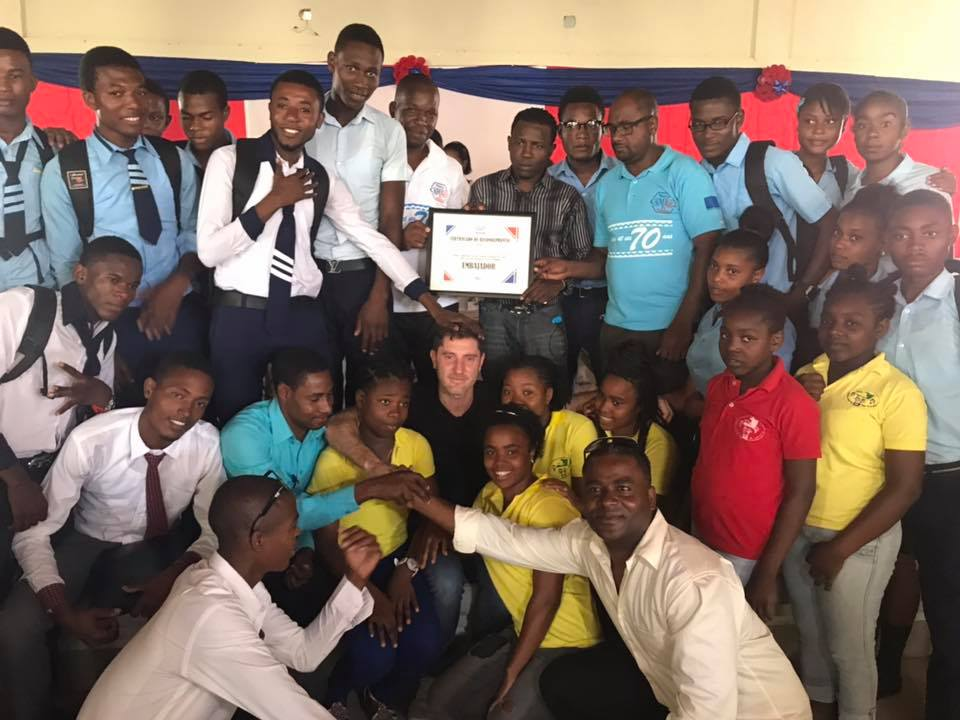
Nicolas Garcia Mayor in Haiti Belladere

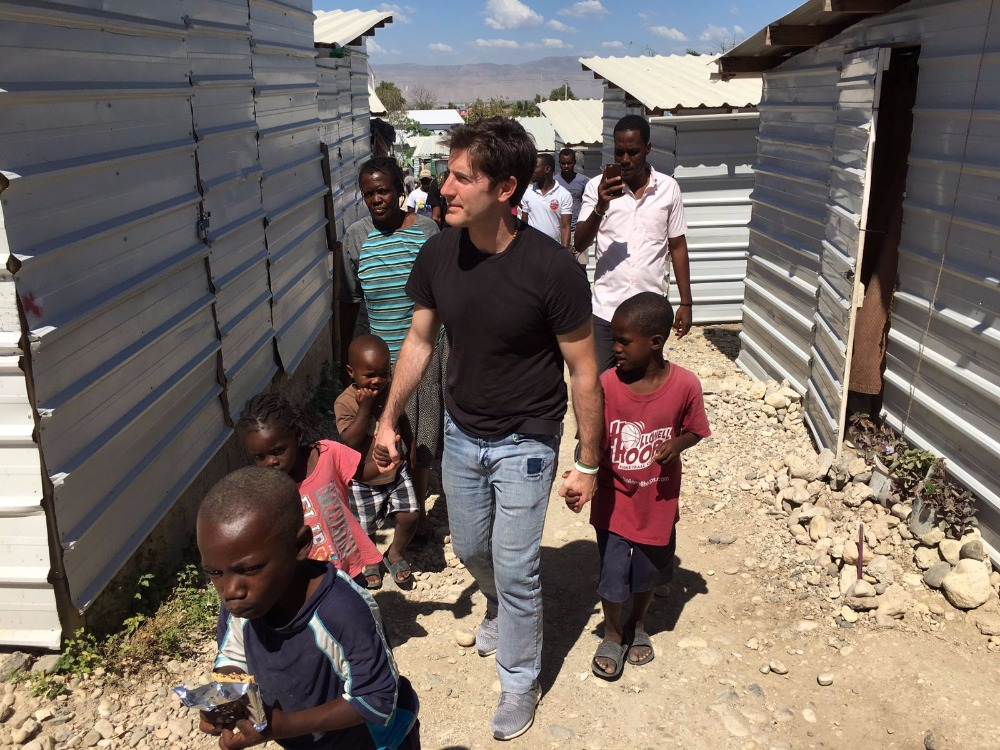
Nicolas Garcia Mayor in a refugee camp

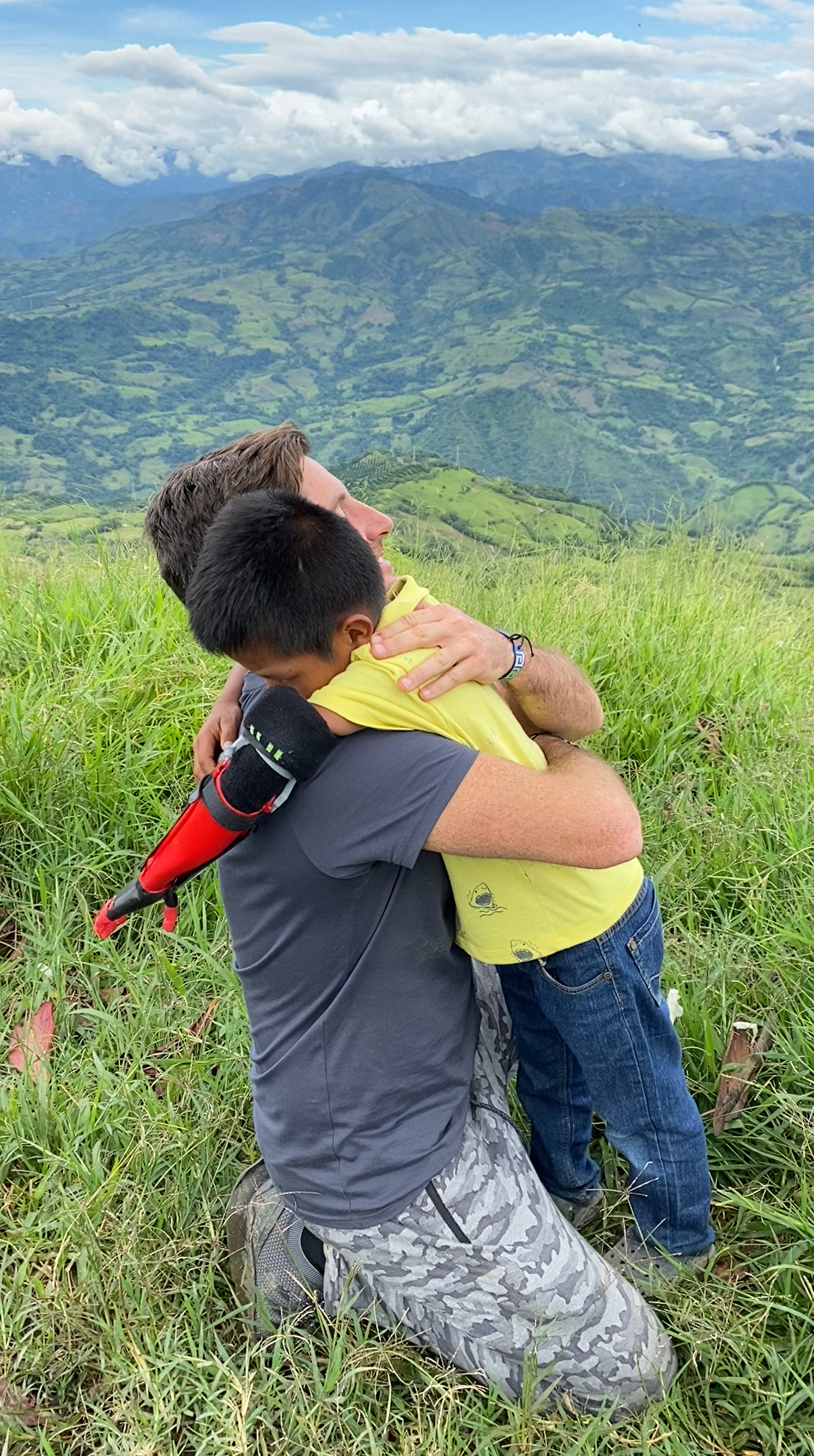
3d arm Prosthesis for Heyder

== Cmax System ==
Nicolas Garcia Mayor is the founder and designer of the Cmax Mobile Units solutions for multipurpose uses as vaccination clinic, shelter, camping, industry, events and beyond. Cmax was created as emergency shelter urbanization system that provides immediate housing for refugees and displaced people. In 2020, more than two in five U.S. hospitals with intensive care units have reached occupancy levels of 85 percent or higher. When bed availability dwindles and hospitals begin to operate in crisis mode, Cmax Med was the best affordable and rapid solution.

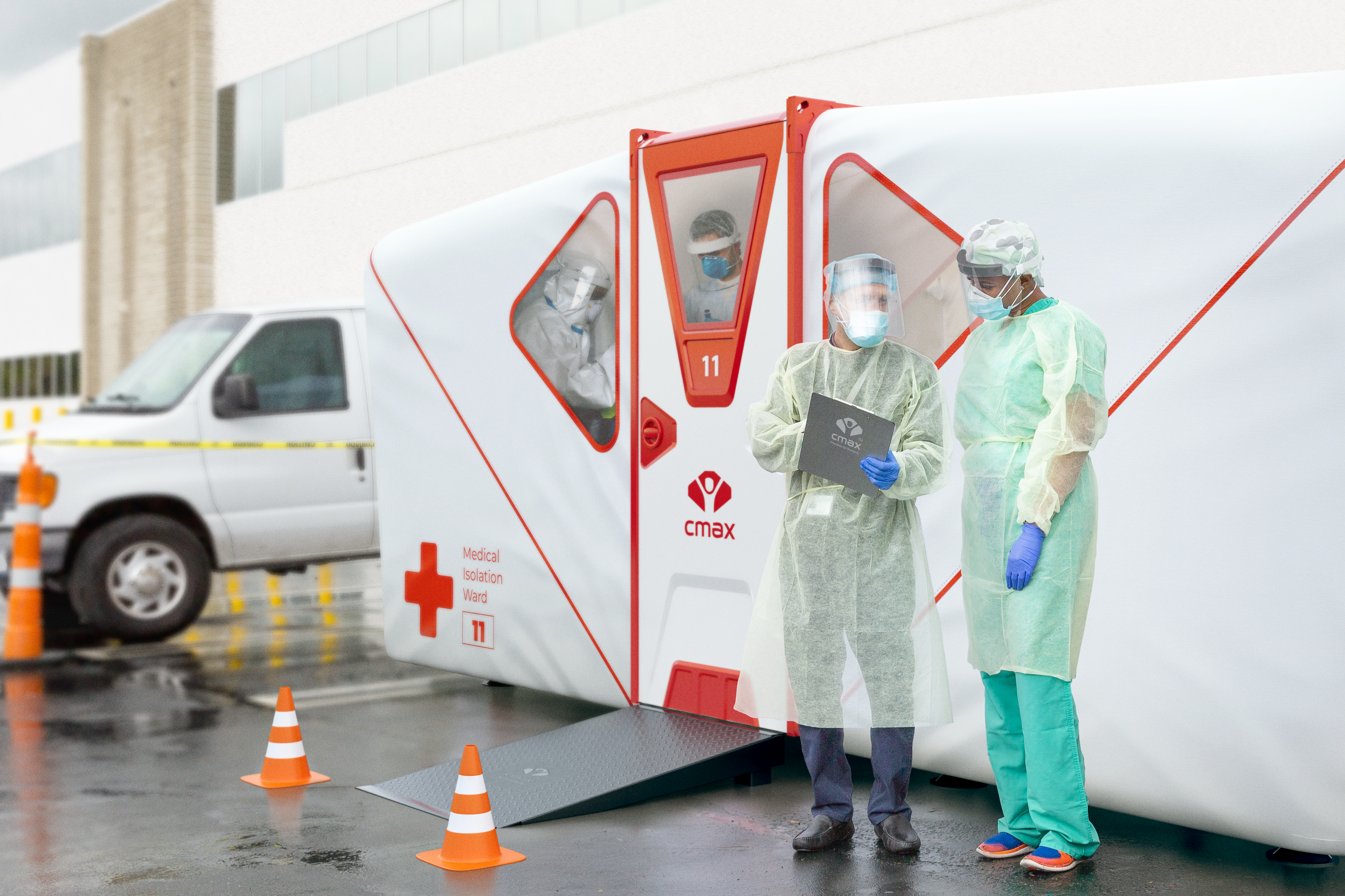
Cmax Medical foldable Unit innovative Field Hospital

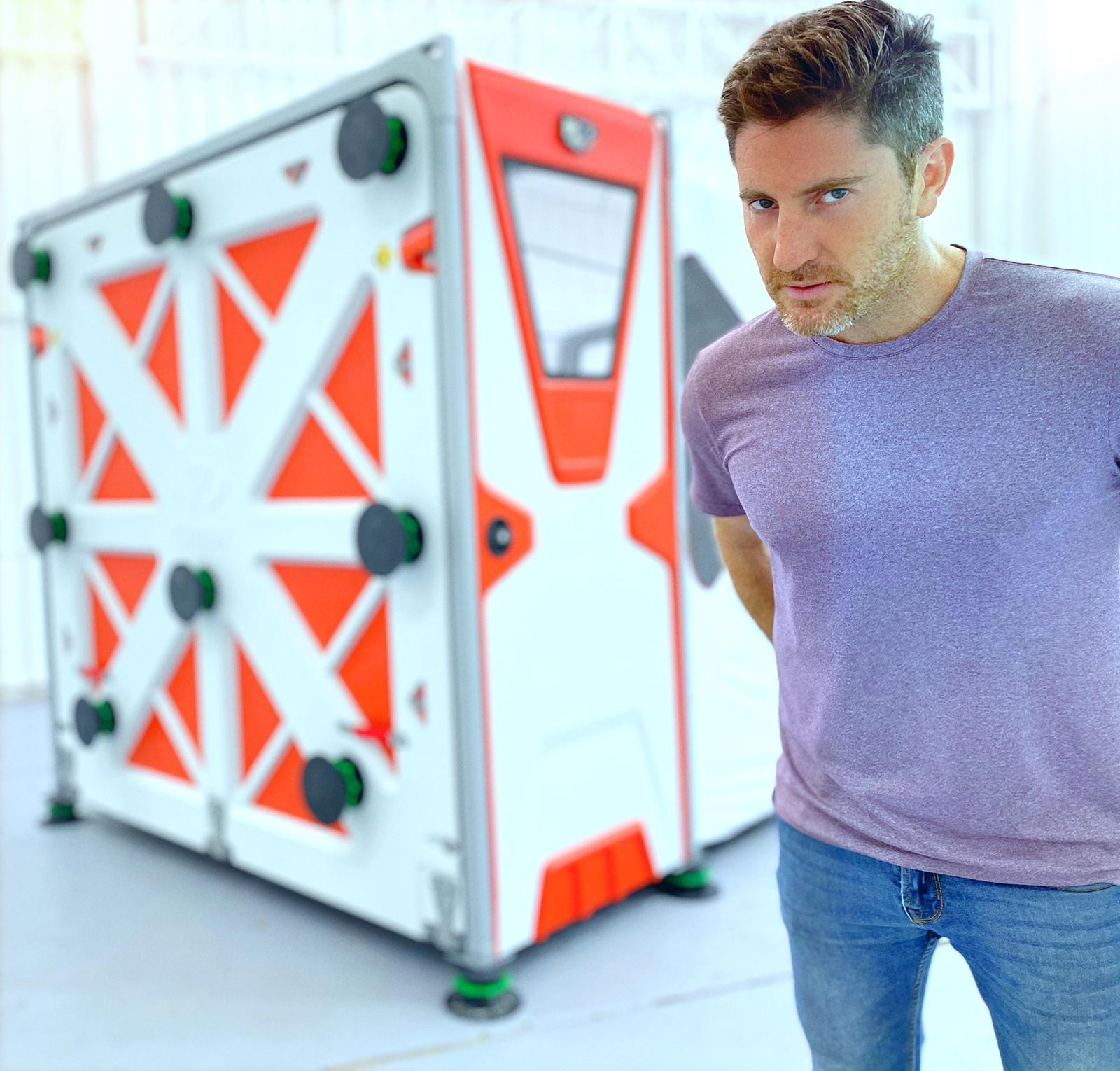
Nicolas Garcia Mayor launching Cmax System Units

== Awards & Recognitions ==
- Selected by London Design Festival. The 20th anniversary edition, September 2022, London, UK
- Invitation to Honour in the British Parliament with the prestigious award for the outstanding humanitarian services to promote Peace, Education and Trade Harmony initiatives globally, London, UK 2022
- Special Consultative Status granted to Cmax Foundation which have a special competence of the fields of activity covered by the ECOSOC, The United Nations, New York, USA 2021
- Global Humanitarian Award - NY Summit - Marbella, Spain, 2021
- Awarded with the most important recognition that Colombia currently has from the academy around the work of Industrial Designers Buen Punto Award. Universidad de Pamplona, Colombia, 2019
- Honoree Board of Directors of ARISE Mexico, Private Sector Alliance for Disaster Resilient Societies. First national public-private network to prevent and mitigate disasters in Mexico. City of Mexico, 2018
- Named Goodwill Ambassador to Haiti for your support and social innovations ideas in Port au Prince, Belladère and Mollière. Haiti 2018
- Outstanding Humanitarian Service (Ser Servicio) University of Monerrey Award recognizes individual professionals for contributions in charitable activities, care of the indigent and community service performed above and beyond the typical duties of an Industrial Designer, Monterrey, Mexico 2018
- The Emmy® Award Nominated 2018 by Telemundo Interview is the premier television production award.
- Designated as Strategic Advisory Committee in Social Innovation & Entrepreneurship to the Balseiro Institute, considered the best Experimental Physics and Nuclear Engineering study centre of Latin America, Bariloche, Argentina 2017
- Honore Speaker in The creative industries at University of Cuyo UNCuyo Mendoza Argentina 2016
- Award in The Ibero American Design Biennial BID16 / The Best Product Design / The Cmax System Madrid Spain 2016
- Keynote Speaker Congress Institute of Industrial Engineers Guayaquil Ecuador 2016
- Honore Speaker in Inter-American Development Bank DEMAND SOLUTIONS IDEAS FOR IMPROVING LIVES Washington DC 2015
- Honore Speaker in United Nations Headquarters JCI GLOBAL PARTNERSHIP SUMMIT NEW YORK 2015
- Selected in 2015 within the 30 most Young Cultural Innovators in the world, as advisory in the humanitarian problems at Salzburg Austria 2015
- Nominated for 2015 Business for Peace Award, given to "business leaders whose actions and commitments constitute an exceptional contribution to the promotion of ethical behavior and peace" in Oslo, Norway.
- Distinction for professional achievements 2013, awarded by the Honorable Senate of the Province of Buenos Aires.
- Distinction for professional work 2013, awarded by the Association of Industrial Designers of Buenos Aires.
- JCI TOYP 2014 Honoree (Leipzig, Germany) as a Young Outstanding Person of the world for his contribution to children, world peace and Human Rights.
- JCI TOYP 2013 Honoree as a Young Outstanding Person of Argentina for his contribution to children, world peace and Human Rights.
- JCI TOYP 2013 Honoree as a Young Outstanding Person of the Province of Buenos Aires for his contribution to children, world peace and Human Rights.
- “Citizen Recognition” given in 2014 by the Honorable Council of Bahía Blanca, for the merits achieved in the humanitarian field.
- “Guest of honor” of the government of Rio Grande in 2014.
- “Argentine Creative” Award 2014 given by Argentine Creative Circle, award given to people who stand out for their originality and ingenuity. The same award was received by outstanding people such as: Clorindo Testa, Jorge Guinzburg, Jorge Lanata, Gustavo Santaolalla, Juan Carr, Adrián Paenza, Mario Pergolini, among others.
- Distinction "Development Leadership: Governor Enrique Tomás Cresto 2014" awarded by the Senate of the Nation for his work on behalf of their communities and the progress of society.
- Award “Exportar 2013” by Fundación Exportar for his contribution to national development and export of value added.
- Award “Ambassador of Argentina country brand” by the Ministry of Tourism of Argentina.
- Cmax System, selected by the Argentine Foreign Ministry to represent the country at the International Forum for Development of Humanitarian Affairs 2013 held in Washington DC.
- UN Honored Guest to present the Cmax System at the 68º General Assembly in front of representatives of the world in September 2013.
- Distinction by the office of the UN Humanitarian Aid OCHA for his participation as a panelist in December 2013 in the Regional Meeting on International Mechanisms for Humanitarian Assistance in Latinamerica and The Caribbean in United Nations Headquarters in New York.
- Ar estudio, awarded first prize “innovative SMEs” in 2013 by the Ministry of Production, Science and Technology of the Province of Buenos Aires.
- Ar estudio, awarded “Innovative Company” in 2012 by the Ministry of Production, Science and Technology of the Province of Buenos Aires.
- Ar estudio, selected within the 15 most prominent studios in the world, by consultant Marcus Evans to join the Industrial Design Summit in Cannes 2010 as a consultant to leaders such as BMW, Audi, Coca-Cola, Google, Facebook and Electrolux among others companies.
- Ar estudio, selected for the Innovation Catalog Argentina 2010/2011/2012/2013 by the Ministry of Science and Technology of Argentina.

== See also ==
- Industrial design
- List of industrial designers
- Ron Arad (industrial designer)
- Philippe Starck
- Jonathan Ive
