= Kitso Masi =

Motswana actor (born 1984)

Kitso Masi (born 11 November 1984) is a Motswana actor who won the pan-African reality television show Imagine Afrika and is a leader in the movement for an HIV free generation in Botswana. He is the executive director of the South East District Youth Empowerment League (SEDYEL) in Botswana. In 2009, Masi was honored by JCI as one of the Ten Outstanding Young Persons of the World (TOYP). He is currently pursuing his degree in drama at the University of the Witwatersrand in South Africa.
