= Sabirul Islam =

British entrepreneur, author and motivational speaker (born 1990)

- সাবিরুল ইসলাম
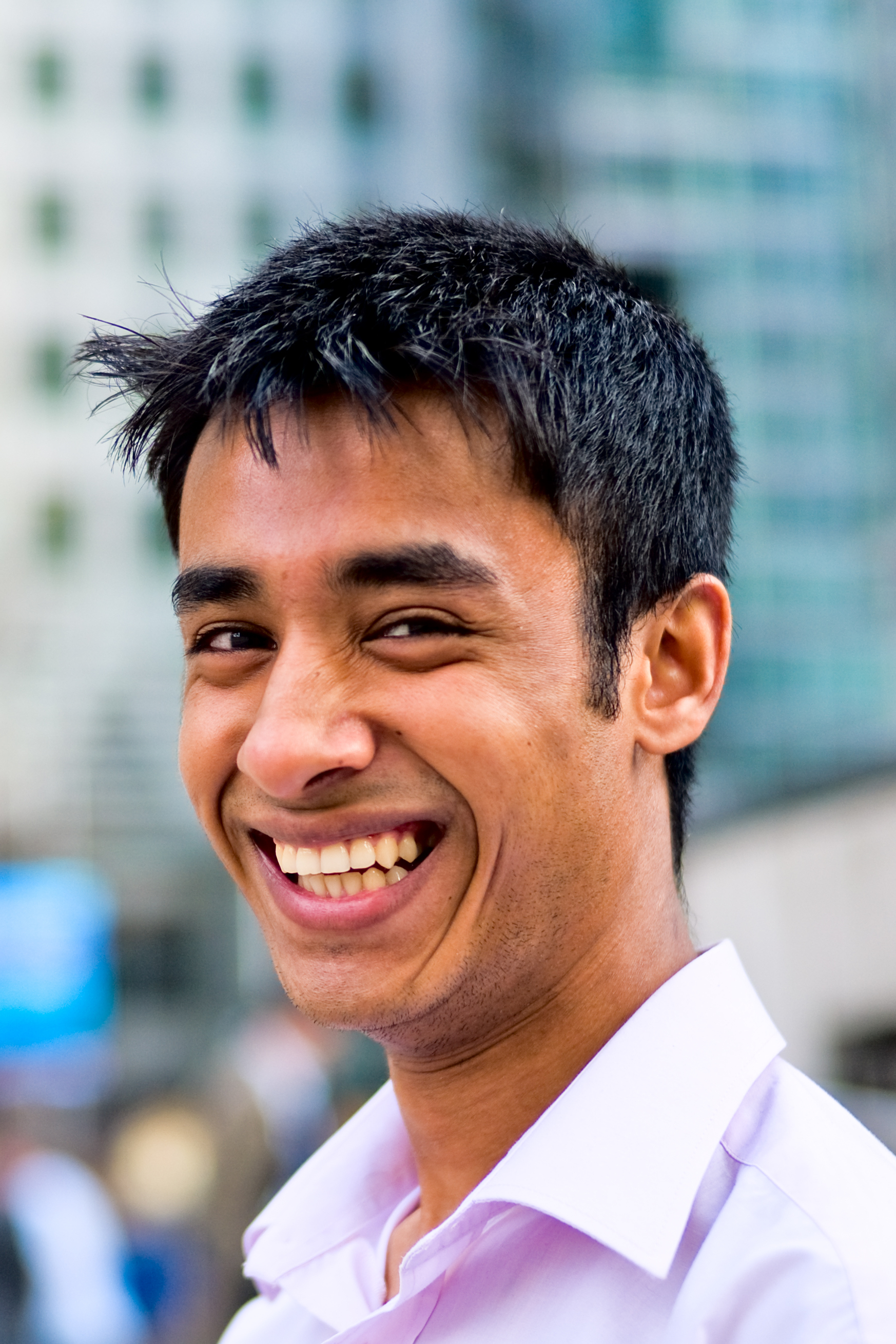
- Sabir in April 2008
- Born: 12 July 1990 (age 36); Tower Hamlets, London, England
- Education: City and Islington College
- Occupations: Entrepreneur, author, motivational speaker
- Years active: 2004–present
- Spouse: Nabila Zahan Meril (m. 2014)
- Website: www.sabirulislam.com

Sabirul Islam (Bengali: সাবিরুল ইসলাম; born 12 July 1990) is a British entrepreneur, author and motivational speaker. He has written three self-help books. His Teen-Trepreneur board game sold to over 550 schools in the United Kingdom and in 14 countries worldwide. Since 2011, he has spoken at 867 events worldwide as part of his Inspire1Million campaign.

== Early life ==
Sabirul was born in Tower Hamlets, London, England and grew up in London, England. He attended Swanlea School. In 2008, he left City and Islington College.

Sabirul's parents are from Bangladesh with roots in Sylhet who came to London to work and live a better lifestyle. He has five siblings; two younger brothers and three younger sisters.

Sabirul first visited Sylhet at the age of three. During his childhood, his parents never worked and mainly lived off state benefits in UK, and in his neighbourhood, violence, crime and drugs were regular issues. He was diagnosed with epilepsy at the age of 11 and his doctors opined that he could never travel in an airplane in his condition.

== Career ==
=== Early career ===
At the age of 13, Sabir was hired by his 14-year-old cousin in his company, The Royal Dragons, designing and printing calendars for teachers. Islam was given the role of a production director, however after Sabir did not take it seriously and took it for granted, he was fired after two weeks.

Proving his cousin wrong was the motivation behind setting up his first business. In September 2004, Sabir's first business was a website design company for corporate businesses called Veyron Technology, which he ran with six friends, all 13 to 14 years old. They knocked on the doors of five renowned banks asking to design their website to every employee that happened to pass by. The sixth bank was Merrill Lynch and the executive director took notice of them and gave them a chance and they made £2000 within the first two weeks. Two years later he closed it down. His company had several other major clients, including ABN AMRO and Morgan Stanley and even won an award for 'Best Inner East London Company'.

At the age of 16, whilst still studying at school, he was employed by Merrill Lynch as junior stock trader, which provided him with a two-week programme to learn the basics about investment and trading in New York City. Three months later he became a part-time trader for a period of nine months.

In 2006, he met Mybnk founder, Lily Lapenna, when he entered a competition to invest £10 into various items to sell on at a profit, he turned it into £200.

=== Teen-Trepreneur Trilogy books and board game ===
At the age of 17, Sabir spent three months during lunch hours writing his first book. After being rejected by 40 publishers he edited, designed and marketed the book himself. In January 2008, using his own funds he self-published his first book The World at Your Feet. The book offers young people guidance and encouragement to turn their entrepreneurial vision into reality. His book launch allowed him to become a motivational speaker. In the first nine months following the launch, over 42,500 copies of his book were sold. At the age of 18, he got the book professionally published, the book then sold globally. The book has now sold 60,000 copies.

Sabirul invested £20,000 of his own money and spent 10 months developing and launching a business board game with six 11- to 15-year-olds. Teen-Trepreneur teaches key aspects of business from sales, to investment, expenses to loans and the even understanding the stock exchange. The game was intended to educate young people about enterprise, entrepreneurship and financial literacy. In June 2009, the game was launched, due to its multi-purpose in introducing 15 of 25 units taught for BTEC Level 2 Diploma in Business, the game has been integrated into the BTEC Business Qualification in over 500 schools across the UK. The game has sold over 300,000 copies in 14 countries worldwide.

Alongside the board game, his second book The World at Your Feet: Three Strikes to a Successful Entrepreneurial Life was published.

In February 2012, his third book Young Entrepreneur World was published. The book contained interviews with 25 of the most influential and successful entrepreneurs around the world, who share their journeys, thoughts and ideologies on a personal, business and political level. The book contains interviews, personal success stories and how others could achieve similar success within their respective fields. Over 100,000 copies of his books have been sold to date, which have been published in multiple languages including Spanish and Bengali.

October 2015, Sabirul signed a deal with a local company, to launch Teen-Trepreneur to digital platforms. The digital version of the game will be called Teen-Trepreneur Fusion and will be free for download and available on android and IOS platforms.

=== Business ===
In November 2010, Sabirul launched Teen-Speakers Bureau, which is a speakers bureau consisting of 39 of the world's most influential young people, all under 25 on a single speaking platform who have stories and talk on a personal, business and political level to enforce change amongst society and striving to empower youth worldwide with a message that 'Generation Y' has what it takes to be successful.

Sabirul created a new business called The World at Your Feet after his first book, which comprises many small enterprises and programs that deliver inspiration, empowerment and entrepreneurial initiatives to youth across the world to open their gateway to success.

He also developed a training programme called The Cycle of Success, which features three training books and DVDs to educate youth about entrepreneurship and setting up businesses through a 15 step programme, teaching self-discovery, personal branding and knowing when you are ready to set up a business.

He has also created a publishing agency Teen-Publishers for young people aged 5 to 25 to publish their books professionally and sold through online retail channels. He also develops interactive websites for young entrepreneurs.

=== Motivational speaking ===
His book launch of The World at Your Feet allowed him to become a motivational speaker. In the first nine months following the launch, at the age of 17, while studying at college, he shared his experience as a young entrepreneur at 379 events (including 333 schools schools, colleges and universities) across the UK.

At the age of 18, he spent around £600 to be on a magazine that was distributed to every single university in the UK. Six months later, a former Nigerian First lady called him personally to Nigeria to speak in front of a crowd which turned out to be over 3,500 people, after she was impressed with the article he wrote in the magazine.

In November 2010, Sabirul launched Inspire1Million, a campaign to inspire one million people around the world to achieve success in life by delivering a host of events and seminars. In 2010, at Junior Chamber International (JCI) Outstanding Young Persons of the World Award, Sabir took the opportunity to launch his Inspire 1 million campaign and asked for help to globalise this campaign. 45 nations came forward. He was then invited to Botswana to speak where he appeared in 43 events hosted in 10 cities over 12 days. 200,000 people attended the events, which is almost 10% of the whole population of Botswana.

Since May 2011, starting with the Maldives, he went on a round-the-world tour aiming to go to 20 countries in 12 months to inspire, engage, empower young people to reach their potential, and transform the lives of one million people globally to achieve success through enterprise and entrepreneurship. As of October 2013, he has travelled to 26 countries in Africa, Asia, South America and Europe, made 63 international visits, spoken at over 777 events, to an attendance of 890,145 people worldwide.

In November 2010, Sabirul spoke at the TEDx Youth Event in Amsterdam. In 2013, he spoke at the TEDx event at Muscat, Oman.

Since October 2013, Sabirul has been a columnist for Prothom Alo. He writes a supplement 'Swapno Nie' every Sunday, called 'Nijer Pothe Choli'

Sabirul is due to star in a new South African business reality television series for young entrepreneurs. The series is a 13-week youth business show, to encourage growth in entrepreneurship in South Africa which will now be produced in Bangladesh.

== Awards ==
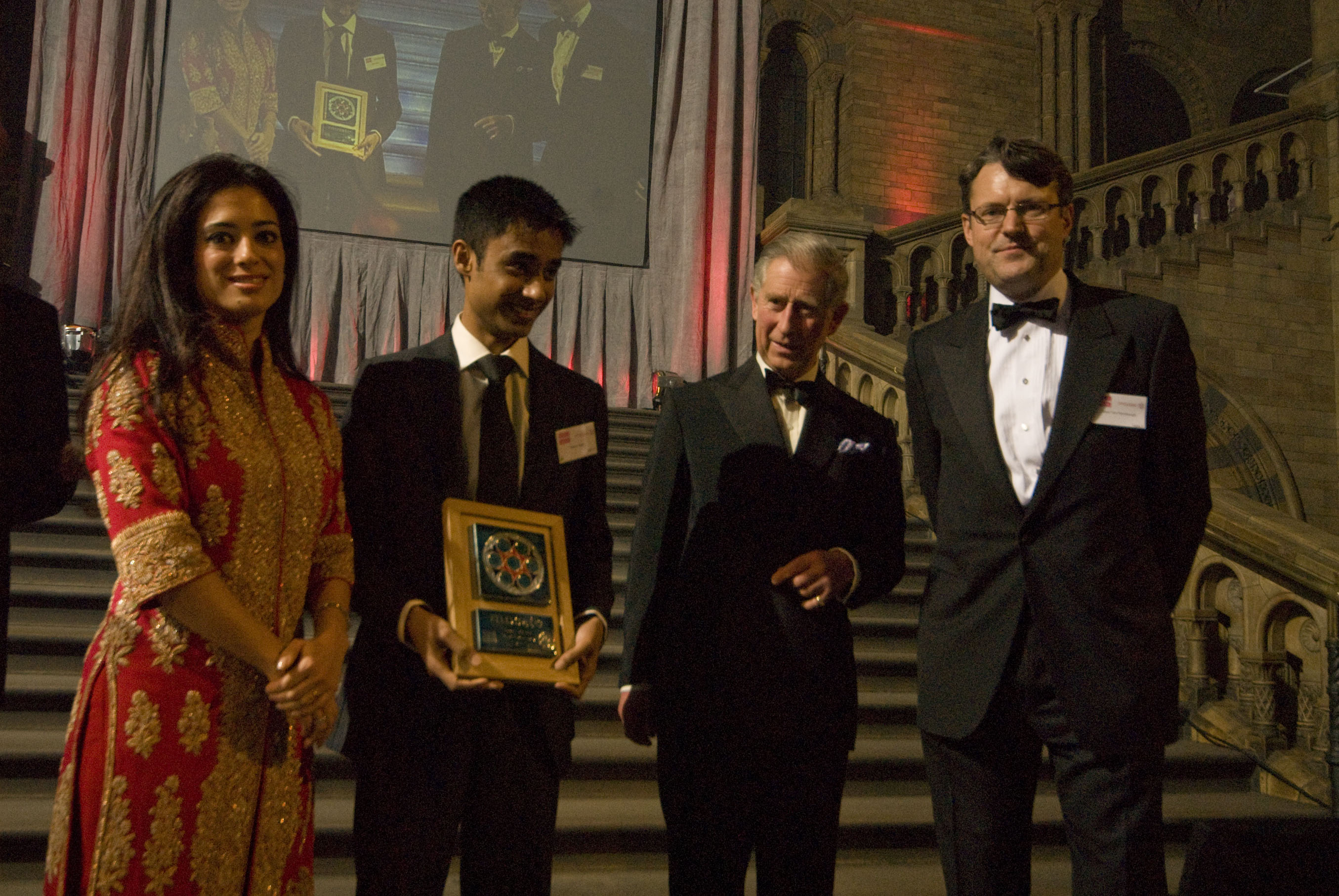
Sabirul Islam receiving the Mosaic Entrepreneur of the Year Award in 2008

In 2008, Sabir was awarded the Mosaic Entrepreneur of the Year by Charles, Prince of Wales and the Princess of Jordon. He was nominated by Merrill Lynch, and was the youngest person nominated for the award.

In 2010, he was one of Junior Chamber International (JCI) 10 Outstanding Young Persons of the World, honoured in the JA-YE Top 20 Young Entrepreneur in Osaka, Japan and shortlisted for Community Business Entrepreneur Award at the Spirit of London Awards. Other awards include the Growing Up CEO Award, which he was awarded at Harvard Business School. In January 2015, he was nominated for the Services to Creativity and Technology award at the British Muslim Awards. In January 2015, he was nominated for the Young Achiever of the Year award at the English Asian Business Awards.

== Personal life ==
From August to September 2013, Sabir visited Bangladesh for the first time in 20 years, where he spent two weeks promoting his Inspire1Million campaign through a number of events. He delivered speeches at six universities in Dhaka, visited 10 different universities and colleges at Chittagong, Sylhet and Brammanbaria to deliver his speech and share his experience.

== Books ==
| Year | Title | Publisher | ISBN |
|---|---|---|---|
| 2008 | The World at Your Feet | Lulu Press | 978-1847993977 |
| 2009 | The World at Your Feet: Three Strikes to a Successful Entrepreneurial Life | Marshall Cavendish | 978-0462099521 |
| 2012 | Young Entrepreneur World: How 25 Teen-Trepreneurs Succeeded and Left World Leaders Scratching Their Heads | Marshall Cavendish Business | 978-9814361095 |

== See also ==
- British Bangladeshi
- List of British Bangladeshis
