= Spirit of London Awards =

Award ceremony in London

- Abbreviation: SOLA
- Formation: 2009
- Type: Youth Awards and Movement
- Legal status: Foundation
- Headquarters: London Bridge
- Location: 25G Copperfield Street London, SE1 0EN
- Region served: London
- Official language: English
- Founder: Gary Trowsdale
- Parent organization: Spirit of London Awards Foundation
- Affiliations: PlayStation, Barclays, Working Links, Choice FM, Candy Store, AEG, British Youth Council, Kiss 100 London, The Sun (United Kingdom), SB.TV, Endz 2 Endz Magazine

The Spirit of London trophy

The Spirit of London Awards is an awards ceremony that awards young people for their talent across London and the UK, in the arts, media, sport, campaigning and education. The project was created by the Gary Trowsdale in 2009 as a way of addressing the imbalance young people are portrayed by the national media by creating a Community Oscars for young people to rival the MOBO Awards and the BAFTAs. SOLA is also a youth movement aimed at decreasing crime by young people, decreasing poverty and ensuring every young person reaches their potential. They do this by working in conjunction with the Greater London Authority, local government and Parliament.

Supporters include David Cameron PM, Frank Warren, Leona Lewis, Brooke Kinsella, Noel Clarke, Diversity, Boris Johnson and Rio Ferdinand. It is supported by Barclays, The Sun, Team GB, Kiss 100, Working Links, PlayStation and many other organizations and companies.

The first Spirit of London Awards was held on 27 November 2009, at the Alexander Palace in London. The second awards took place 27 November 2010, at The O2 Arena IndigO2 in London. The 2011 awards took place at the Royal Albert Hall on 20 November 2011 and the 2012 awards took place on 10 December 2012 at The O2 Arena.

Before each awards night there is a reception at 10 Downing Street so the short-listed nominees can meet the prime minister of the United Kingdom. The prime ministers to have greeted and congratulated the nominees so far are Gordon Brown and David Cameron.

== Downing Street reception ==
Approximately two weeks before the awards night the three nominees in each category, the sponsors of the event and performers on the night get a chance to meet each other at 10 Downing Street before the prime minister of the United Kingdom delivers a speech.

== SOLA School Roadshow ==
Previous nominees along with a celebrity ambassador go to secondary schools all over London to speak to the students about their experiences. There is also a Q&A at the end when students can ask questions.

In 2012 the roadshow went to over 20 schools in London.

== Youth manifesto ==
In 2012 using the collection of ideas from 140 young ambassadors of SOLA and other young people around London's most disadvantaged areas a youth manifesto was created which delivers ideas on how the government can effectively engage young people in the UK. It was written by 23-year-old Oliver Hypolite-Bishop who also wrote Siobhan Benita's manifesto for the 2012 London mayoral election. It was presented to David Cameron, Nick Clegg and Ed Miliband on 29 November 2012.

== Award categories ==
The Spirit of London Awards 2011

Lucas Pinto (8), winner of the Young Hero Award 2011

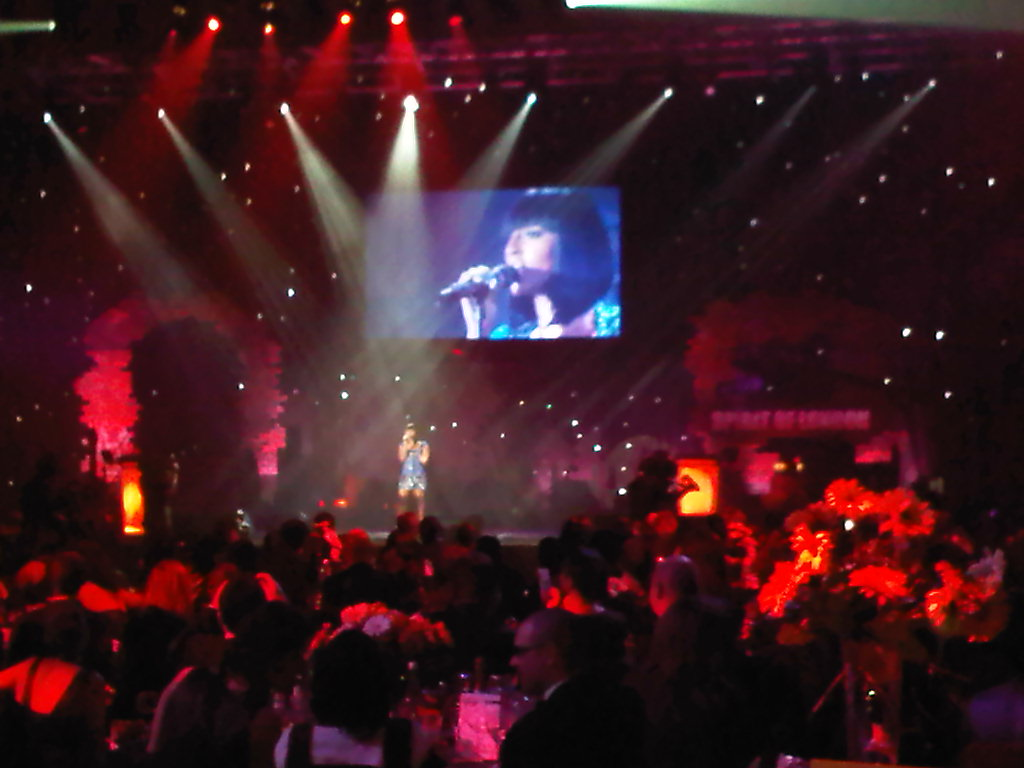
Alexandra Burke performing for SOLA

Each category has three nominees shortlisted. (Sometimes one more is added in special circumstances.)

- Community Champions Award – Young people who strive through their endeavors and positive actions to make their mark on their local community.
- London Legend Award – The award goes to the iconic Londoner who young people feel deserves recognition for their role in promoting London positively on the world stage.
- Young Heroes Award (Mayor's Order of Merit) – An award for special kids whose special deeds have made a difference to their local community.
- Achievement Through Sport Award – For young people who either excel themselves against the odds or who use sport to help others in the community.
- Achievement Through Music Award – Young people who use their ability with music to progress in life or to brighten up the lives of others in their communities.
- Community Business Entrepreneur Award – This award is for a young person or group of young people who light their local community with their enterprise through business.
- Achievement Through Education Award – An important award category and one which will be awarded not necessarily to an individual but perhaps to a class of young people who have excelled together and brightened up their local community in doing so.
- Achievement Through The Arts Award – An awards category for those that make their mark creatively in the arts world – film, television, theater, literature and then light up the world for others in doing so.
- Special Recognition Award – This award is made for outstanding contribution to charity campaigning.

== 2012 awards ==
The awards ceremony on 10 December was held at The O2 Arena in Greenwich. The hosts for this event were Emily Atack and Russell Kane; the confirmed line up performing on the night included Labrinth, Maverick Sabre, Stooshe, McFly, Noisettes, YolanDa Brown, Diversity and Angel.

The submissions for each category this year averaged 3000 nominations.

The Spirit of London Awards will become the biggest ever youth event with an 8000-seater audience celebrating the young people of the UK.

== 2011 awards ==
The awards were held on 20 November 2011. The event was at The Royal Albert Hall and was hosted by Stacey Solomon and Eddie Kadi.

Performers on the night included Tinchy Stryder, Beverley Knight, DJ Fresh, Diversity and Keri Hilson.

=== Class of 2011 ===
==== Achievement through music ====
- David o'Connell – Winner
- Miranda Gunn – Shortlisted
- J – Sol – Shortlisted

==== Achievement through education ====
- Alexandros Pamnani – Winner
- Kay-Jay Simmons – Shortlisted
- Jamal Walker – Shortlisted

==== Achievement through media ====
- Bobby Jenkins – Winner
- Creative Nerds – Dirujan Sabesan & Sam Thornton – Shortlisted
- Courtney Dionne Carr – Shortlisted

==== Community champions ====
- HYPE – Winner
- Barking & Dagenham young inspectors – Shortlisted
- Horizons ShoutOut Council – Shortlisted

==== Young business entrepreneur ====
- Jude Samuel Escol – Winner
- Jahmila Connage – Shortlisted
- Jessica Rose – Shortlisted

==== Achievement through the arts ====
- Antoinette Rita Opeyemi – Winner
- Torron-Lee Dewar – Shortlisted
- Fabien Soazandry – Shortlisted

==== Achievement through sport ====
- Pechkam BMX Club – Winner
- Mauro Vilhete – Shortlisted
- Darius Knight – Shortlisted

==== Young hero ====
- Lucas Pinto – Winner
- Louis French – Shortlisted
- Cynthia Masiyiwa – Shortlisted

==== Achievement through fashion ====
- Jessica Anuna – Winner
- Jada Simone – Shortlisted
- Nicholas Amfo – Shortlisted

==== Young campaigner of the year ====
- Callum Fairhurst – Shortlisted
- Eliza Reberio – Shortlisted
- Jahanara Chaudhry – Shortlisted

==== London legend ====
- Harry Redknapp – Winner

== 2010 awards ==
The awards were held 27 November 2010. This year's event was held at the IndigO2 in Greenwich, and was hosted by Tamar Hussan (Clash of the Titans) and Tasha Danvers (Olympic bronze medalist in 400m hurdles).

The supporting cast included such acts as Toploader, Roll Deep, Labrinth, Robbie Craig, Diversity, and Alexandra Burke.

=== Class of 2010 ===
- Vanessa Sanyauke (Rafiki Network) – Won Community Champions Award
- Nutmeg – Shortlisted for the Community Champions Award
- Bigga Fish Street Team – Shortlisted for the Community Champions Award
- Prendergast Ladywellfields College – Won Young Heroes Award
- Supakids – Shortlisted for the Young Heroes Award
- Joshua Sukama – Shortlisted for Young Heroes Award
- Jessica Elliott (Dancing After School) – Won Community Business Entrepreneur Award
- Omar Choudhry – Shortlisted for the Community Business Entrepreneur Award
- Sabirul Islam – Shortlisted for the Community Business Entrepreneur Award
- Hayley Rea (Aim High Dance Academy) – Won Achievement Through The Arts Award
- Big Deal Youth Arts Company – Shortlisted for the Achievement Through The Arts Award
- Alice Moore – Shortlisted for the Achievement Through The Arts Award
- Camara Fearon – Won Achievement Through Music Award
- Clarence 'Poetic Preacher' Jackson – Shortlisted for the Achievement Through Music Award
- SwiftKnight – Shortlisted for the Achievement Through Music Award
- Robert Hughes – Won Achievement Through Sport Award
- Ryan Jones – Shortlisted for the Achievement Through Sport Award
- Chloe Spiteri – Shortlisted for the Achievement Through Sport Award
- Bobby Kensah – Won Achievement Through Education Award
- Nathan Ghann – Shortlisted for the Achievement Through Education Award
- Jesse Andrews & Jessie Brock – Shortlisted for the Achievement Through Education Award
- Dennis Gyamfi (Endz2Endz) – Won Achievement Through Media Award
- The Exposure Team – Shortlisted for the Achievement Through Media Award
- Raphael Oyelade – Shortlisted for the Achievement Through Media Award
- Barbara Windsor – Won London Legend Award

== 2009 awards ==
In attendance were distinguished celebrities such as Sir Michael Caine, JLS, Tasha Danvers, and Tamar Hassan, the majority of the mayors from the 33 London boroughs, senior executives from various sponsors, and notable government officials.

The show was hosted by Brooke Kinsella and Lemar. There were performances by Alexandra Burke, DJ Ironik, and Diversity to name but a few who gave their time for free to celebrate the young people.

=== Class of 2009 ===
- Daniel De Gale – Won the Special Recognition Award
- Nathan Storey – Won the Young Heroes Award
- The Silvester Cousins – Shortlisted for the Young Heroes Award
- Thomas Robertson – Shortlisted for the Young Heroes Award
- Steve Jones – Shortlisted for the Young Heroes Award
- Dean Atta – Won the Achievement Through the Arts Award
- Islington Youth Theatre – Shortlisted for the Achievement Through the Arts Award
- SuperArts Dancers – Shortlisted for the Achievement Through the Arts Award
- Ebonie Reid-Barlow – Won the Achievement Through Education Award
- Tommy Williams – Shortlisted for the Achievement Through Education Award
- Michael Adewale – Shortlisted for the Achievement Through Education Award.
- Kolor Skeme – Won the Community Business Entrepreneur Award
- MBG Funhouse – Shortlisted for the Community Business Entrepreneur Award
- The Cordless Show Team – Shortlisted for the Community Business Entrepreneur Award
- The Respect Team – Won the Community Champions Award
- Ascension Eagles Senior Coed Team – Shortlisted for the Community Champions Award
- Burntwood School Envision Team – Shortlisted for the Community Champions Award
- Mariama Samba – Won the Achievement Through Music Award
- Frances Davies – Shortlisted for the Achievement Through Music Award
- Matthew Haynes – Shortlisted for the Achievement Through Music Award
- Liam O'Brien (aka Ritz) – Shortlisted for the Achievement Through Music Award
- Marlon Mellish – Won the Achievement Through Sport Award
- Sean Safo – Shortlisted for the Achievement Through Sport Award
- Jack Booth – Shortlisted for the Achievement Through Sport Award
- Sir Michael Caine – Won the London Legend Award
