= Adepeju Jaiyeoba =

Nigerian social entrepreneur (born 1983)

Adepeju Opeyemi Jaiyeoba
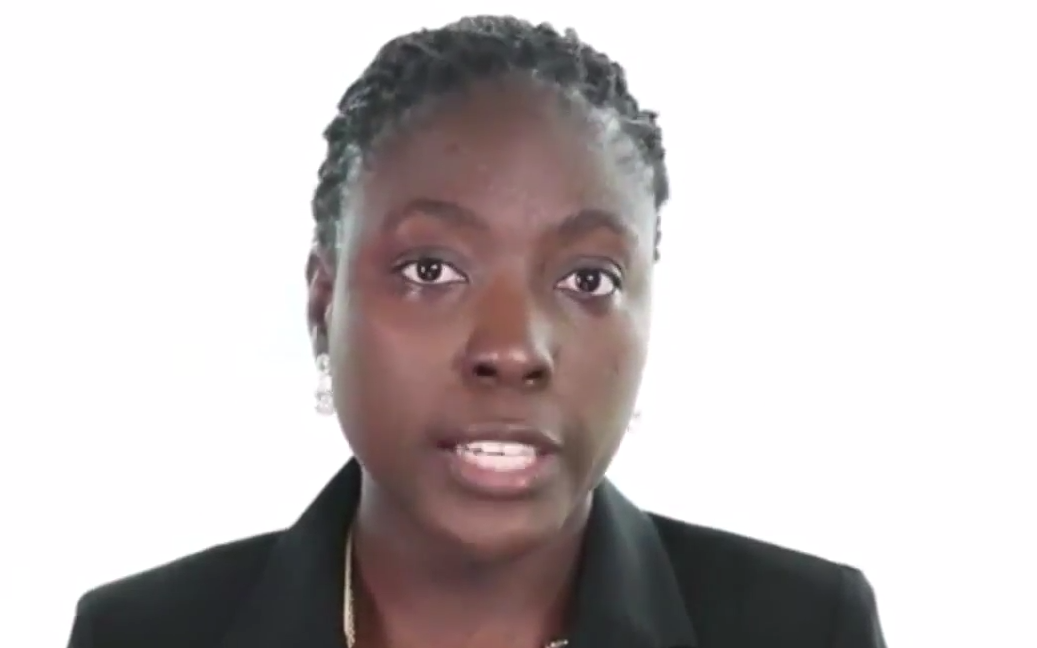
- Adepeju Jaiyeoba in 2014
- Born: Adepeju Opeyemi Mabadeje; November 6, 1983 (age 42); Lagos, Nigeria
- Education: Obafemi Awolowo University
- Occupation: Social Entrepreneur/Lawyer/Activist
- Known for: Creating delivery kits for Nigerian mothers and inspiring many young Africans to action
- Parent(s): Mr. Gbenga Mabadeje and Mrs. Feyisara Mabadeje

Notes
- Audio interview (Wiki Loves Women Radio)

Adepeju Opeyemi Jaiyeoba (born November 1983) is a Nigerian social entrepreneur and activist. She created the Brown Button Foundation, which provides low cost health care options and delivery kits containing basic sterile supplies for expectant mothers in Nigeria.

== Life ==
Jaiyeoba trained as a lawyer and attended Obafemi Awolowo University in Ile-Ife. She also studied Business and Entrepreneurship at the University of Texas at Austin.

Jaiyeoba's mission to reduce maternal and child mortality in Nigeria began after the death of a close friend during childbirth in 2011. She discovered that each year, 145 women die in childbirth and 2,300 children die before reaching the age of five in the country.

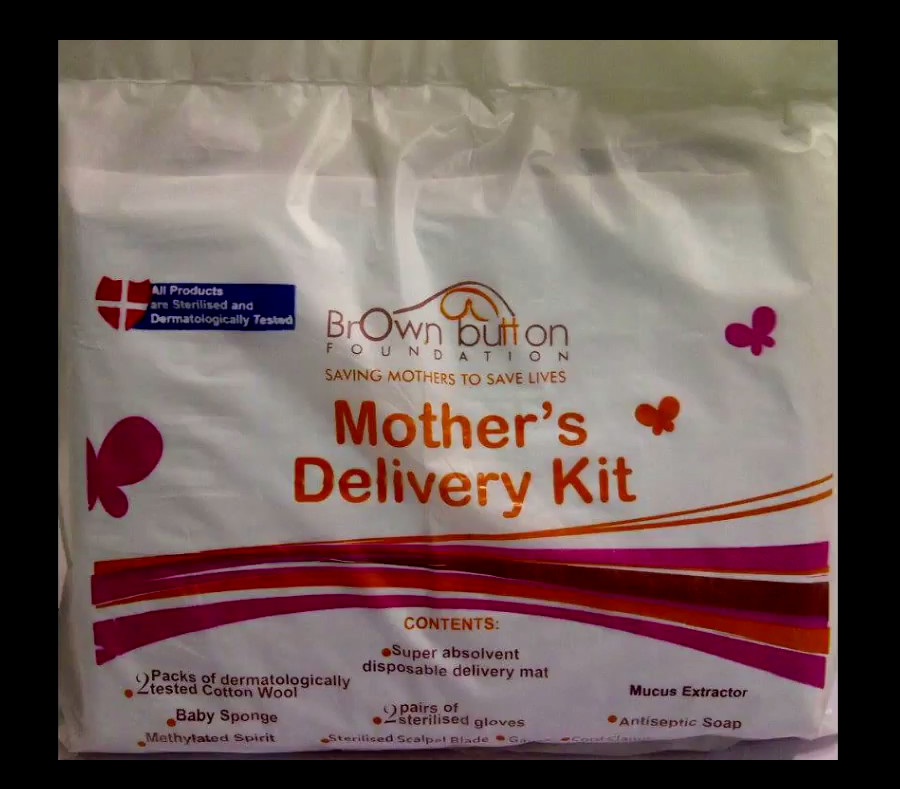
Brown Button Foundation kit

In response, she started the Brown Button Foundation. In 2014 the foundation began providing birth kits to help prevent health issues resulting from lack of sterile supplies during childbirth, such as infections due to the use of rusty blades for severing umbilical cords. By 2015, they had distributed 8,000 kits and by 2017, 300,000.

Jaiyeoba was mentioned by Barack Obama in his address in 2014 to the Young African Leaders Presidential Summit in Washington and was also hosted at the White House in 2015.

In 2017 she gave a TEDx talk.

== Awards ==
- She is a White House Emerging Global Entrepreneur
- She is a PATH International Innovation Champion
- 2018 USADF and Citi Foundation Venture showcase winner
- Frost and Sullivan African Sterilized birth kit innovation award winner
- One of 2017 100 most inspiring women in Nigeria
- 2017 Crans Montana Young Leader of Tomorrow awardee
- JCI top 10 Outstanding Young Persons of the World awardee 2017
- JCI top 10 Outstanding Young Person of Nigeria awardee 2017
- D-Prize awardee in Global Health
- 2018 Unilever Young Entrepreneurs Awards Winner
- 2014 Mandela Washington Fellow
- Fellow of the Unreasonable Institute
- Women in Successful Careers (WISCAR) member
- 2015 Young Innovator of the World Innovation Summit for Health (WISH)
- Africa's top 10 female entrepreneur for Diaspora Demo day
- 2015 YNaija top 10 most influential Nigerians under 40 (Advocacy)
- 2015 Cordes Fellow.
- Commonwealth Point of Light Award Winner
- HRH Prince of Wales Young Sustainability Entrepreneur Prize Winner in 2018.
- Opportunity Desk June 2015 Young Person of the month.

== Public speaking ==
Jaiyeoba has been featured on various high level platforms. She spoke at the Africa Shared Value Summit in 2020; The Platform Nigeria - beyond politics in 2018; Social Media Week Lagos in 2018;
