= Janine Shepherd =

Australian cross country skier (born 1962)

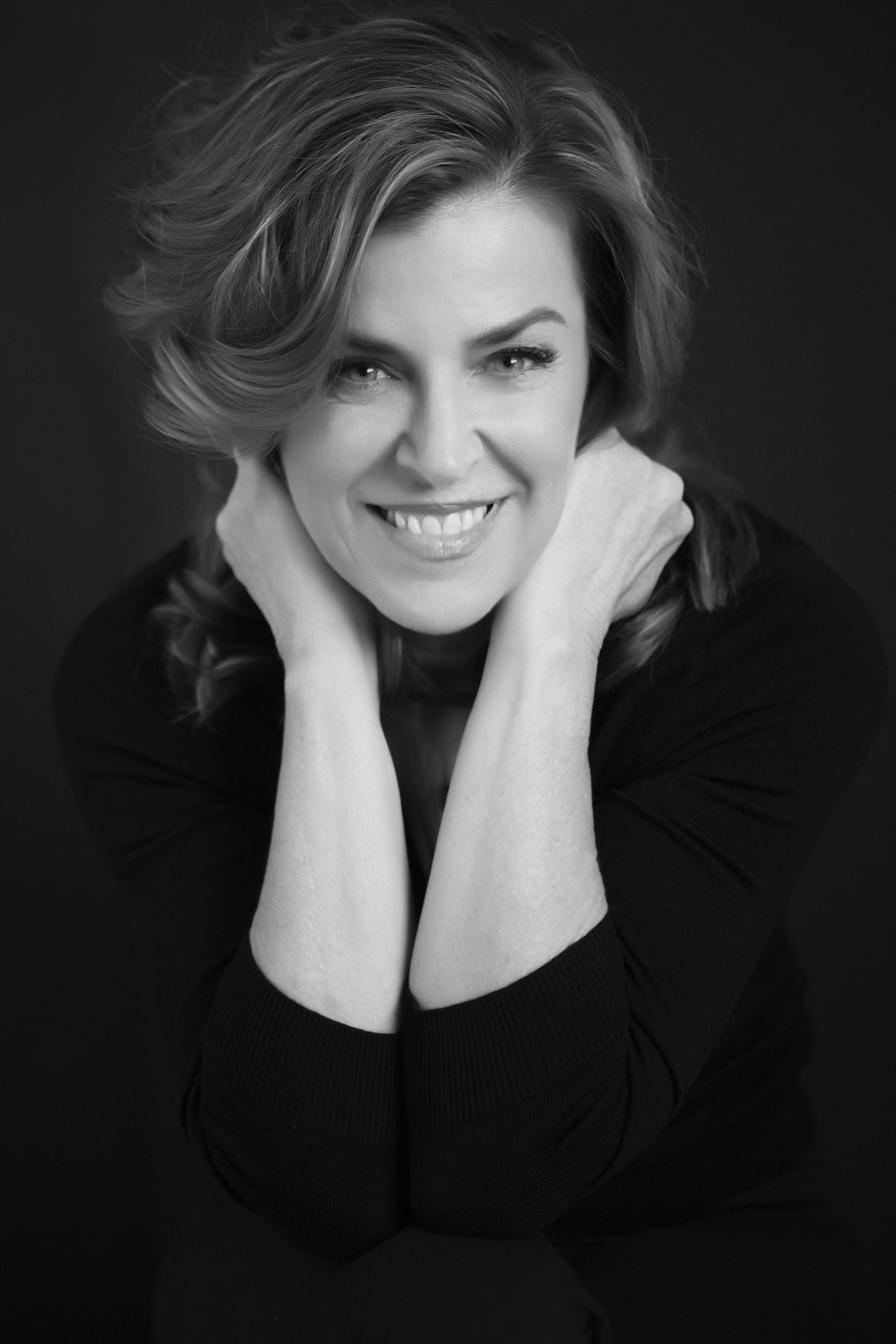
- Born: 1962 (age 63–64); Dural, New South Wales, Australia
- Education: University of Technology, Sydney (BA (Human Movement Studies)) (DipEd (Physical Education))
- Occupations: Author, public speaker
- Known for: Motivational speaker and author
- Children: Annabel, Charlotte, Angus
- Awards: Member of the Order of Australia (2001); Outstanding Young Persons of the World (1998)
- Website: janineshepherd.com

Janine Shepherd, AM is an Australian author, aerobatics pilot and former cross-country skier. Shepherd's career as an athlete ended when she sustained life-threatening injuries when hit by a truck during a training bike ride, while in contention to win Australia's first-ever medal at the Winter Olympics. She survived and her story later became the focus of national attention, as well as a popular telemovie.

== Biography ==
Shepherd had been an athletics champion as a child, and settled on cross-country skiing. After achieving success on the World circuit, she was given the offer of training with the Canadian team in the leadup to the 1988 Winter Olympics in Calgary. In 1986, Shepherd was cycling through the Blue Mountains in New South Wales as part of her training regime, when she was hit by a vehicle, suffering massive injuries. She suffered a broken neck and back, lost five litres of blood, had severe lacerations to her abdominal area. Her right leg was ripped open, her collarbone and five ribs were fractured, and she suffered serious internal injuries, but she survived. She was told that she would be reliant on a wheelchair for the rest of her life, and would never bear children.

Over the next few years, Shepherd recovered. While still remaining a partial paraplegic, she was ultimately able to walk again, and has three children. She gained her pilots licence within a year of the accident, and went on to gain a commercial pilot's licence, then an instructor's licence, eventually becoming a trained aerobatics flying instructor. She also became the first female director of the Civil Aviation Safety Authority.

Shepherd has written six books about her experiences. The first, Never Tell Me Never was made into a successful telemovie, with Shepherd being played by Claudia Karvan. She also has a bachelor's degree in Human Movement/Education, and is a current PhD candidate at Griffith University.

Shepherd was a torchbearer at the 2000 Summer Paralympics in Sydney. Shepherd took up dressage in an attempt to represent Australia at the 2004 Summer Paralympics.

Shepherd is an ambassador for Spinal Cure Australia, and was appointed a Member of the Order of Australia in 2001 for her service to the community, her inspiration and her work in raising awareness of spinal cord research. In 1998, Shepherd was also awarded the title of an Outstanding Young Persons of the World, one of ten young people recognised annually by the Junior Chamber International. Shepherd currently resides in Wollongong, near Sydney.

== Books ==
- Defiant (2016) (ISBN 978-1622037100)
- The Gift of Acceptance (2012) (ISBN 978-1-74269-560-0)
- On My Own Two Feet (2007) (ISBN 978-1-74166-046-3)
- Reaching For Stars (1998) (ISBN 0-09-183986-6)
- Dare To Fly (1998) (ISBN 0-09-183721-9)
- Never Tell Me Never (1995) (ISBN 0-7251-0747-2)
