= Ten Outstanding Young Persons of the World =

Ten Outstanding Young Persons of the World (TOYP) program serves to formally recognize young people who excel in their chosen fields and exemplify the best attributes of the world's young people. The program is sponsored by Junior Chamber International (JCI).

Young men and women may be nominated in one of ten categories. An international panel of judges then selects up to ten honorees, who are chosen from all of the nominations, regardless of category entered. Past recipients have included sportspersons, those who have contributed to society in various ways, and those who have overcome handicaps.

Nominees are often submitted through the Junior Chamber organizations in their home countries. Each national organization typically has a Ten Outstanding Young Persons program, which recognizes young people who exemplify the best attributes of that country's young people.

The international awards began in 1983 and were modelled after the programs sponsored by the national organizations.

== Categories ==
- Business, economic, and/or entrepreneurial accomplishment
- Political, legal, and/or governmental affairs
- Academic leadership and/or accomplishment
- Cultural achievement
- Moral and/or environmental leadership
- Contribution to children, world peace, and/or human rights
- Humanitarian and/or voluntary leadership
- Scientific and/or technological development
- Personal improvement and/or accomplishment
- Medical innovation

== See also ==
- List of recipients of Ten Outstanding Young Persons of the World
- Ten Outstanding Young Americans (United States national program)
