= List of Cultural Properties of the Philippines in Central Luzon =

Properties in Filipino administrative region

This list contains an overview of the government recognized Cultural Properties of the Philippines in Central Luzon. The list is based on the official lists provided by the National Commission on Culture and the Arts, National Historical Commission of the Philippines and the National Museum of the Philippines.

Cultural Property wmph identifier (Note: wmph is an internal identifier used by Wikimedia Philippines to identify the monument. This is not an official identifier, and only shown temporarily in the templates until the government creates an updated complete list.)	Site name	Description	Province	City or municipality	Address	Coordinates	Image
PH-03-0001	Baler Church		Aurora	Baler	Rizal Street	15°45′32″N 121°33′46″E	Upload file
PH-03-0002	Abucay Church		Bataan	Abucay		14°43′17″N 120°32′06″E	Upload file
PH-03-0003	Balanga Cathedral		Bataan	Balanga	Plaza del Mayor, P. Paterno St.	14°40′45″N 120°32′25″E	Upload file
PH-03-0004	Bataan Provincial Capitol		Bataan	Balanga	Capitol Dr	14°40′33″N 120°31′46″E	Upload file
PH-03-0005	Hermosa Church		Bataan	Hermosa	Town Plaza, Burgos–Soliman St.	14°49′48″N 120°30′29″E	Upload file
PH-03-0006	Mount Samat National Shrine		Bataan	Mount Samat, Pilar	Mount Samat Rd.	14°36′21″N 120°30′32″E	Upload file
PH-03-0007	Orani Church		Bataan	Orani	Town Plaza, National Rd.	14°48′02″N 120°32′08″E	Upload file
PH-03-0008	Orion Church		Bataan	Orion	Liwasang Balagtas, National Rd.	14°37′18″N 120°34′35″E	Upload file
PH-03-0009	Samal Church		Bataan	Samal		14°46′12″N 120°32′31″E	Upload file
	Saint Augustine Parish Church		Bulacan	Baliwag		14°57′19″N 120°54′02″E	Upload file
PH-03-0010	Marcelo H. Del Pilar National Shrine		Bulacan	Bulakan	Cupang Rd., San Nicolas	14°47′50″N 120°52′08″E	Upload file
PH-03-0011	Bulakan Church		Bulacan	Bulakan	Town Plaza, Camino Real Rd.	14°47′43″N 120°52′47″E	Upload file
PH-03-0012	Hagonoy Church		Bulacan	Hagonoy	Town Plaza, M.H. del Pilar St.	14°50′06″N 120°44′03″E	Upload file
PH-03-0013	Barasoain Church		Bulacan	Malolos	Paseo del Congreso cor. Don Antonio Bautista St.	14°50′47″N 120°48′44″E	Upload file
PH-03-0014	Malolos Heritage Town (Kamestisuhan District)		Bulacan	Malolos	F. Reyes St.	14°50′30″N 120°48′38″E	More images
PH-03-0015	Alberta Uitangcoy-Santos House		Bulacan	Malolos			Upload file
PH-03-0016	Casa Real		Bulacan	Malolos	Paseo del Congreso cor. Canlapan St.	14°50′39″N 120°48′41″E	Upload file
PH-03-0017	Gobierno Militar de la Plaza Site		Bulacan	Malolos			Upload file
PH-03-0018	School of the Women of Malolos Site		Bulacan	Malolos			Upload file
PH-03-0019	Marilao Church		Bulacan	Marilao	San Miguel St.	14°45′28″N 120°56′56″E	Upload file
PH-03-0020	Meycauayan Church		Bulacan	Meycauayan		14°44′06″N 120°57′25″E	Upload file
PH-03-0021	Obando Church		Bulacan	Obando	J.P. Rizal St.	14°42′38″N 120°56′13″E	Upload file
PH-03-0022	Pandi Church		Bulacan	Pandi	Sta. Maria Pandi Rd.	14°51′47″N 120°57′28″E	Upload file
PH-03-0023	Quingua Church		Bulacan	Plaridel		14°53′09″N 120°51′36″E	Upload file
PH-03-0024	Biak-na-Bato Shrine		Bulacan	San Miguel			Upload file
PH-03-0025	San Rafael Elementary School		Bulacan	San Rafael			Upload Photo
PH-03-0026	Santa Maria Church		Bulacan	Santa Maria	F. Santiago cor. R. Mercado Sts.	14°49′10″N 120°57′48″E	Upload file
PH-03-0027	Central Luzon State University		Nueva Ecija	Muñoz		15°44′13″N 120°56′02″E	Upload file
PH-03-0028	Pangatian Concentration Camp		Nueva Ecija	Cabanatuan		15°30′34″N 121°02′40″E	Upload file
PH-03-0029	Pantabangan Dam		Nueva Ecija	Pantabangan		15°48′41″N 121°06′29″E	Upload file
PH-03-0030	Peñaranda Church		Nueva Ecija	Peñaranda	Rizal St.	15°21′12″N 121°00′07″E	Upload file
PH-03-0031	Angel Pantaleon de Miranda House		Pampanga	Angeles City	290 Sto. Rosario		Upload Photo
PH-03-0032	Fort Stotsenburg		Pampanga	Angeles City (Clark Freeport Zone)			More images
PH-03-0033	Old Municipio Building (Museo ning Angeles)		Pampanga	Angeles City		15°08′05″N 120°35′28″E	Upload file
PH-03-0034	Apalit Church		Pampanga	Apalit		14°57′13″N 120°46′21″E	More images
PH-03-0035	Pampanga School of Arts and Trades		Pampanga	Bacolor		14°59′52″N 120°39′17″E	Upload file
PH-03-0036	Betis Church		Pampanga	Guagua		14°58′32″N 120°38′34″E	Upload file
PH-03-0037	Guagua Church		Pampanga	Guagua		14°57′52″N 120°38′02″E	Upload file
PH-03-0038	Guagua National Colleges		Pampanga	Guagua		14°58′00″N 120°38′07″E	Upload file
PH-03-0039	Lubao Church		Pampanga	Lubao		14°56′19″N 120°36′06″E	Upload file
PH-03-0040	Diosdado P. Macapagal Birthplace		Pampanga	Lubao			Upload file
PH-03-0041	Magalang Church		Pampanga	Magalang		15°12′52″N 120°39′36″E	Upload file
PH-03-0042	Minalin Church		Pampanga	Minalin		14°58′06″N 120°41′02″E	Upload file
PH-03-0043	Augusto P. Hizon House		Pampanga	San Fernando			Upload file
PH-03-0044	Dayrit-Cuyugan House		Pampanga	San Fernando			Upload file
PH-03-0045	Henson-Hizon House		Pampanga	San Fernando			Upload file
PH-03-0046	Lazatin House		Pampanga	San Fernando			Upload file
PH-03-0047	Pampanga Provincial Jail		Pampanga	San Fernando		15°01′24″N 120°41′09″E	Upload file
PH-03-0048	Hizon-Singian House		Pampanga	San Fernando			Upload file
PH-03-0049	Capas Concentration Camp		Tarlac	Capas		15°20′56″N 120°32′43″E	Upload file
PH-03-0050	Aquino Ancestral House		Tarlac	Concepcion		15°19′28″N 120°39′26″E	Upload file
PH-03-0051	Makabulos House		Tarlac	La Paz			More images
PH-03-0052	Pres. Ramon Magsaysay House		Zambales	Castillejos		14°56′15″N 120°11′46″E	Upload file
PH-03-0053	Zambales Provincial Capitol		Zambales	Iba		15°19′33″N 119°58′51″E	Upload file
PH-03-0054	Masinloc Church		Zambales	Masinloc	Sta. Lucia St.	15°32′16″N 119°56′56″E	Upload file

== See also ==
- List of historical markers of the Philippines in Central Luzon
