= Pampanga Provincial Jail =

Prison in Pampanga, Philippines

Coordinates: 15°01′24″N 120°41′07″E

Pampanga Provincial Jail was among the buildings built in 1907 when the property of the current Pampanga Provincial Capitol was acquired. It used to house the courts of Pampanga before serving as the Pampanga Provincial Jail.

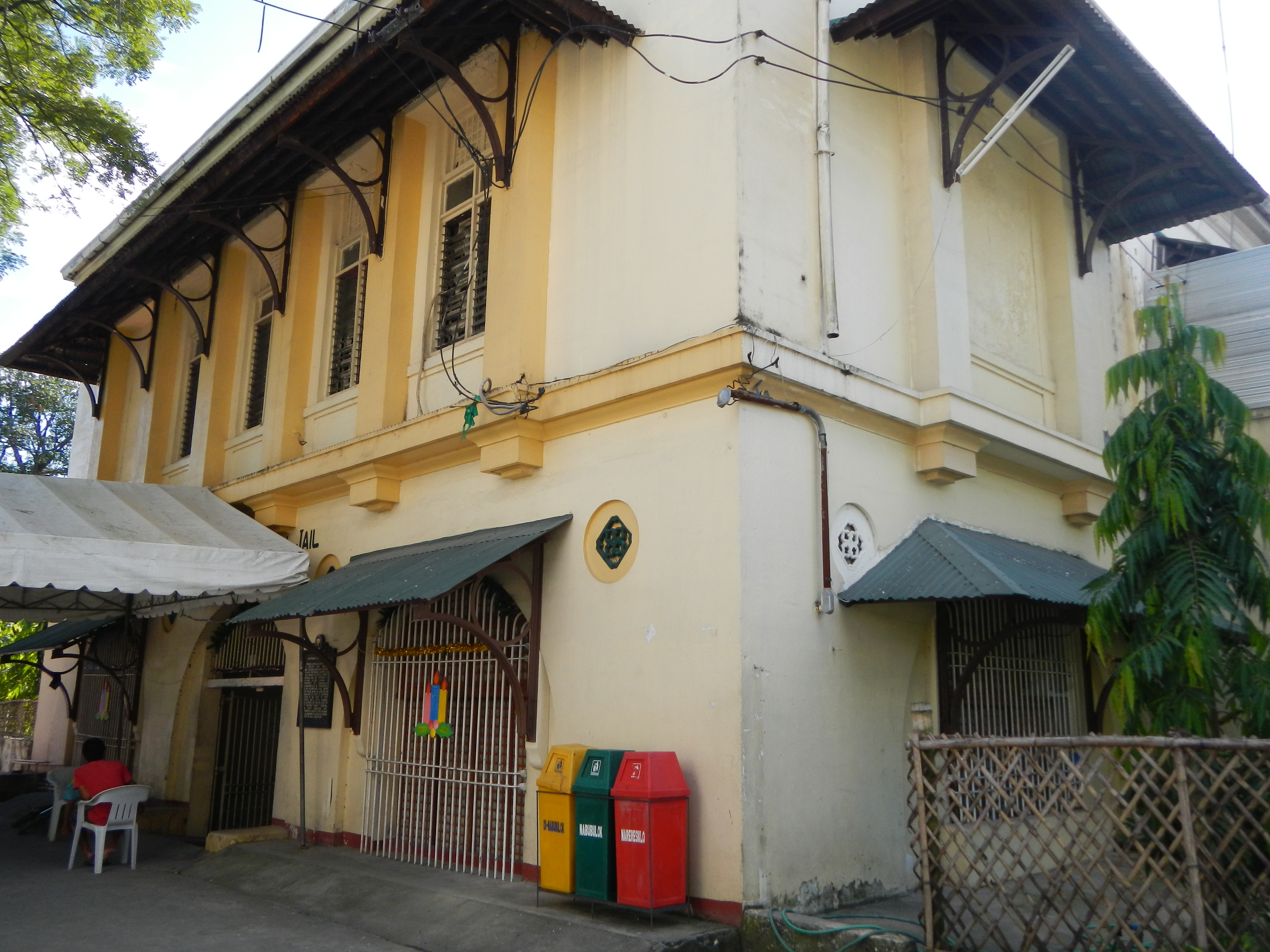
Facade of the Jail (Pampanga Provincial Capitol).

Otherwise known as the "Presidio" located behind the provincial capitol, this building was built and designed in 1907 by William Parsons. It used to house the judicial courts of the province before it became the provincial jail. The cream-colored building with brown and green accents was the typical architecture of provincial jails during the American colonial period.

In 2011, Pampanga Provincial Jail created livelihood programs for the detainees to help augment their income, according to Edwin Hardenico, assistant jail warden, who claimed that the budget allocation for each detainee is not more than P50 per day. Livelihood involving furniture is perfect for the detainees, for Pampanga is well-known for world class furniture, he added. (PNA)

The P25-million dormitory-type facility of the Jail now provides convenience to more than 600 inmates. Provincial Warden Retired Colonel Edwin Mangaliman disclosed that the construction of a dormitory-type jail will serve as the second home of inmates and end overpopulation. Mangiliman claimed that the new building is designed to accommodate at least 1,000 inmates. “Mas malaki ang mga selda, maluwang ang hallway at parang nasa dormitory lang yung mga preso natin kapag natapos na ito,” he said. The capacity of the current jail building is only 300, but the facility has a total of not less than 700 inmates. The old jail facility will be turned over to the National Historical Commission. “Ire-restore po yata nila nila sa original structure nito. Sa kanila po kasi ito, eh,” he explained.

On November 4, 2011, 13-hour hostage drama inside the Pampanga provincial jail ended, with the suspect yielding to his sister but not after wounding two of his three hostages. Wilfredo Lorilla, 34, surrendered after Edwin Mangaliman, the provincial warden, presented the suspect's elder sister who was fetched by policemen from San Carlos City in Pangasinan, said Senior Supt. Edgardo Tinio, Pampanga police director. The sister asked not to be named because her husband works in the military.

== Image gallery ==
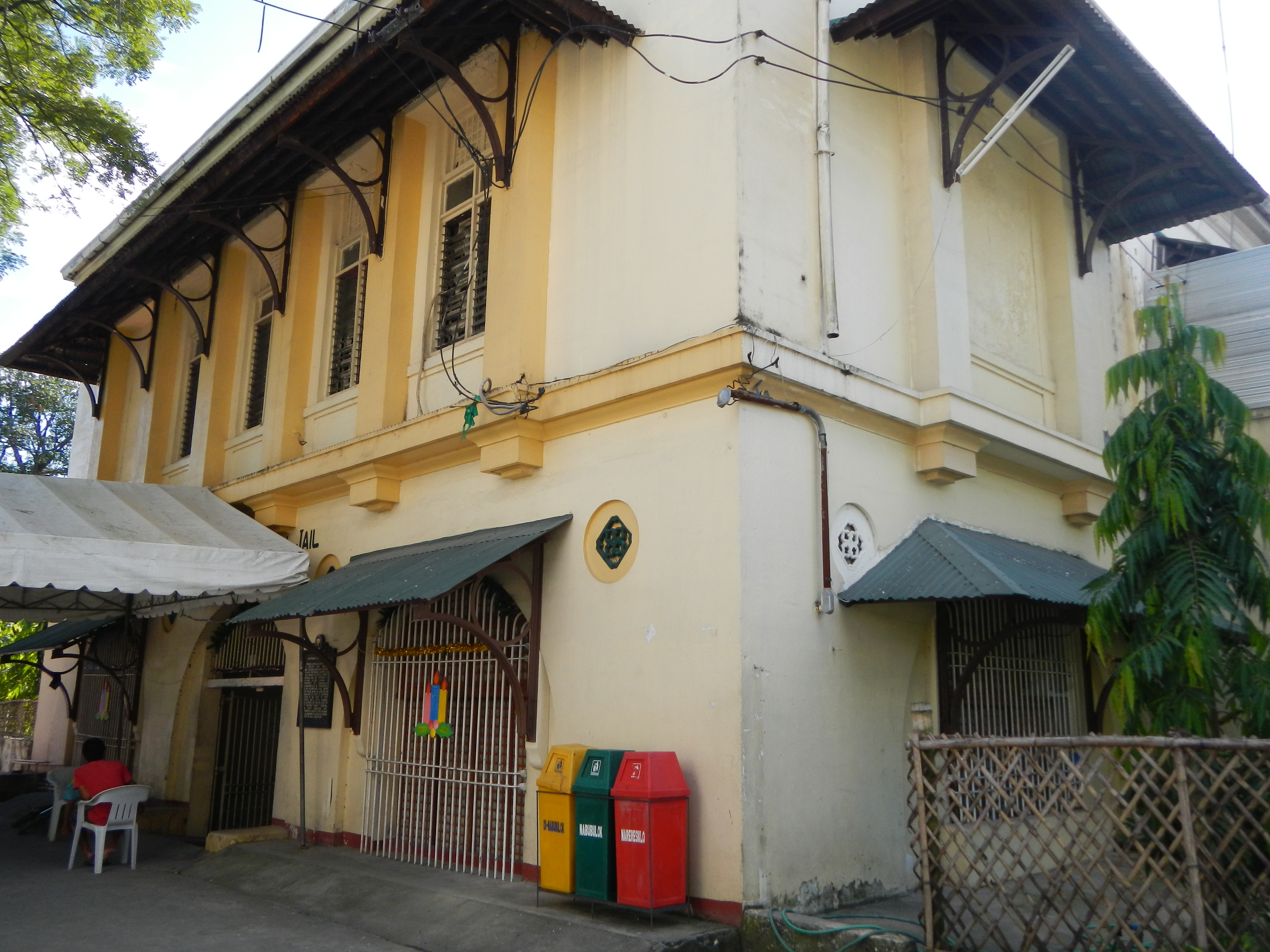
Facade

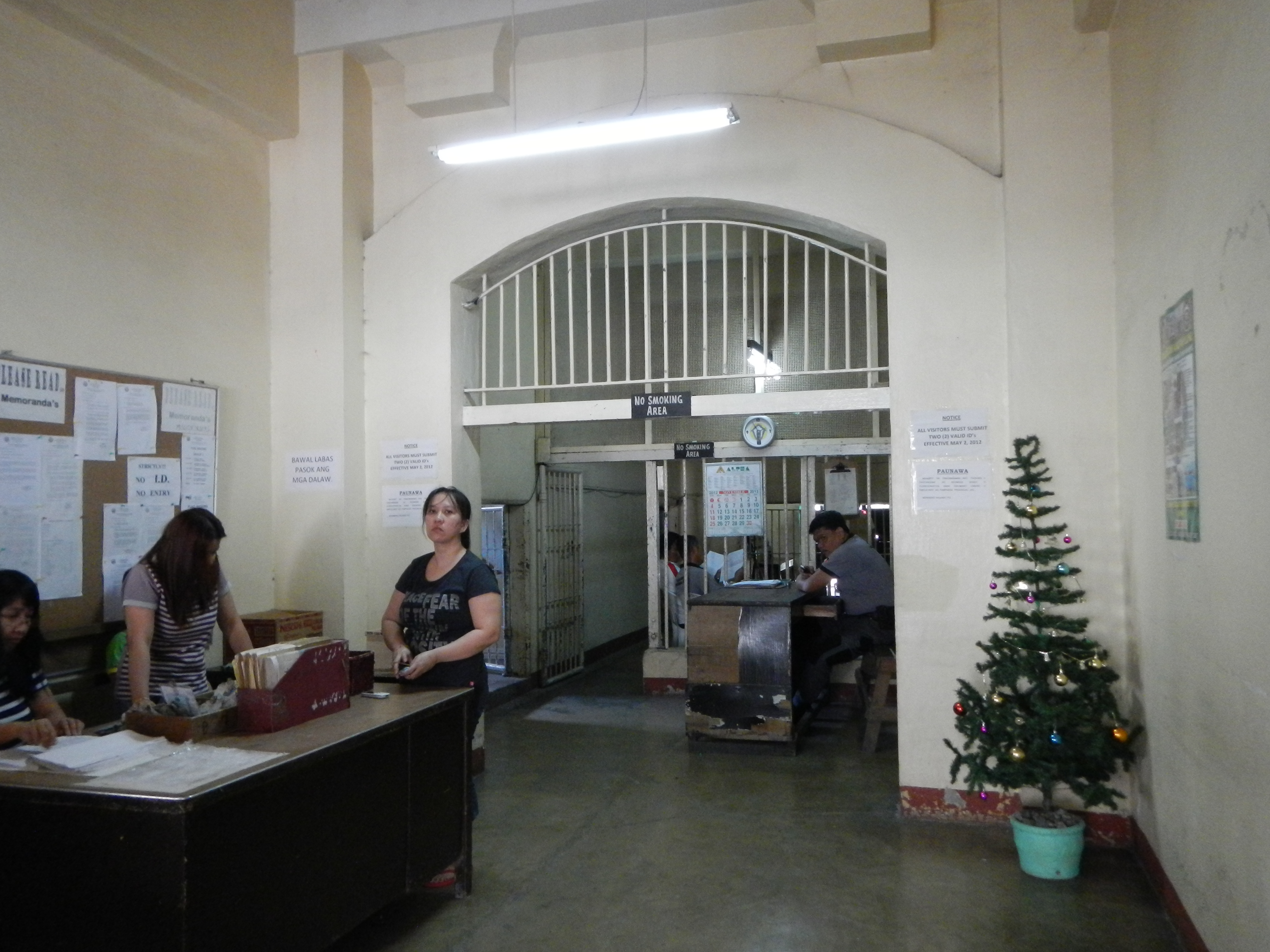
Jail Warden's Office (entrance)

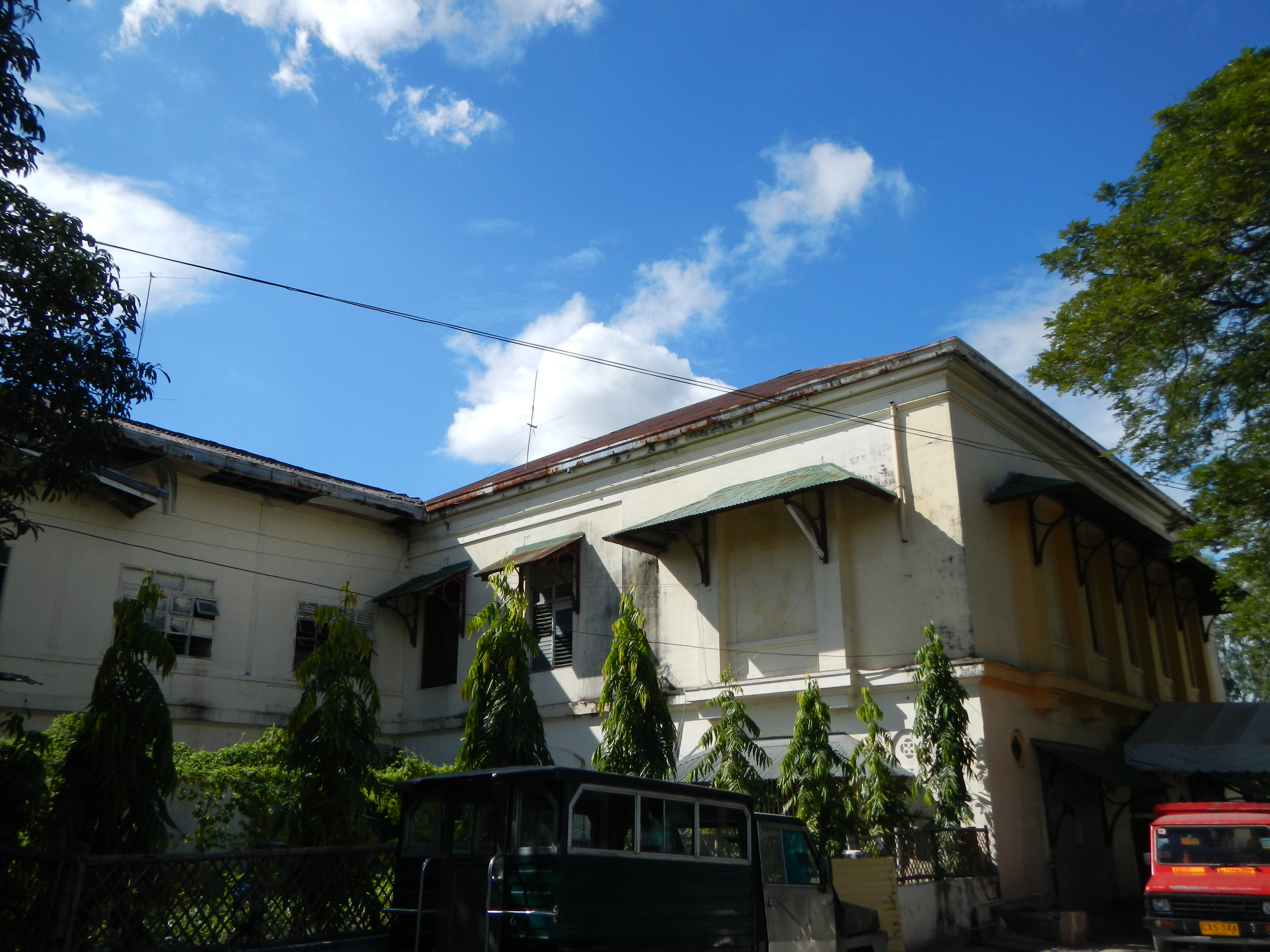
Left side of the Jail

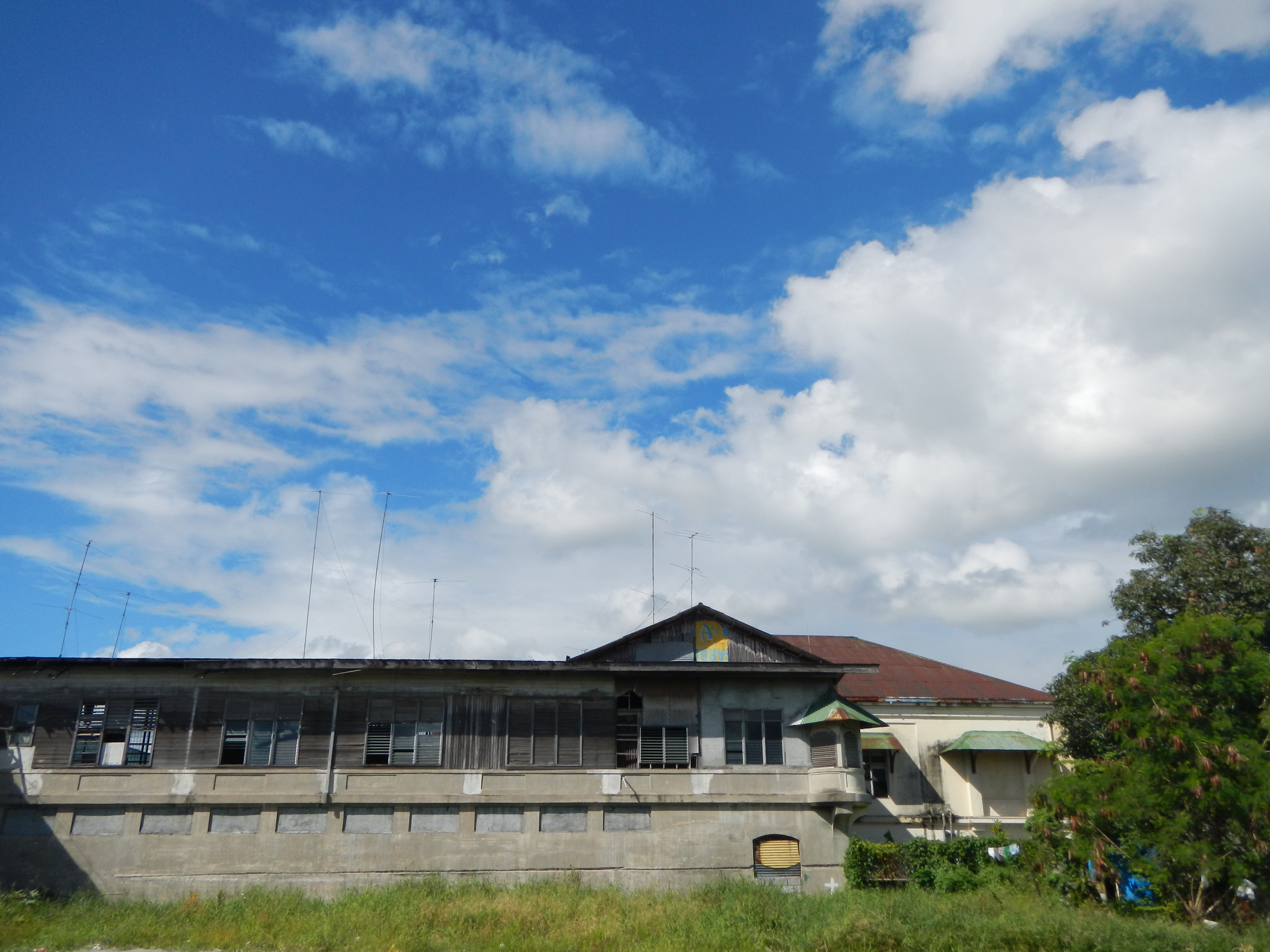
View of the Jail from the Streets

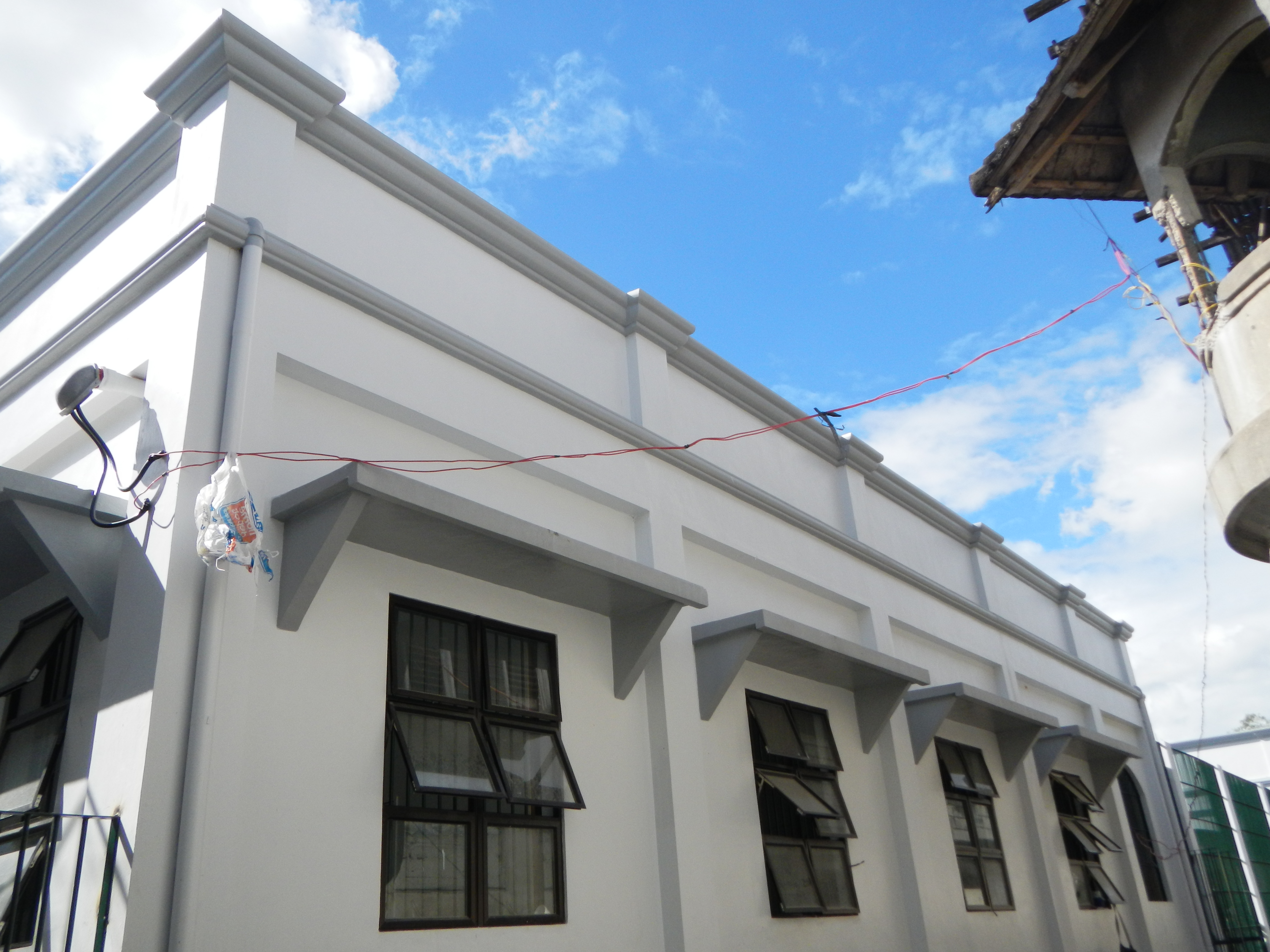
Newly built P25-million dormitory-type facility Jail building (extension)

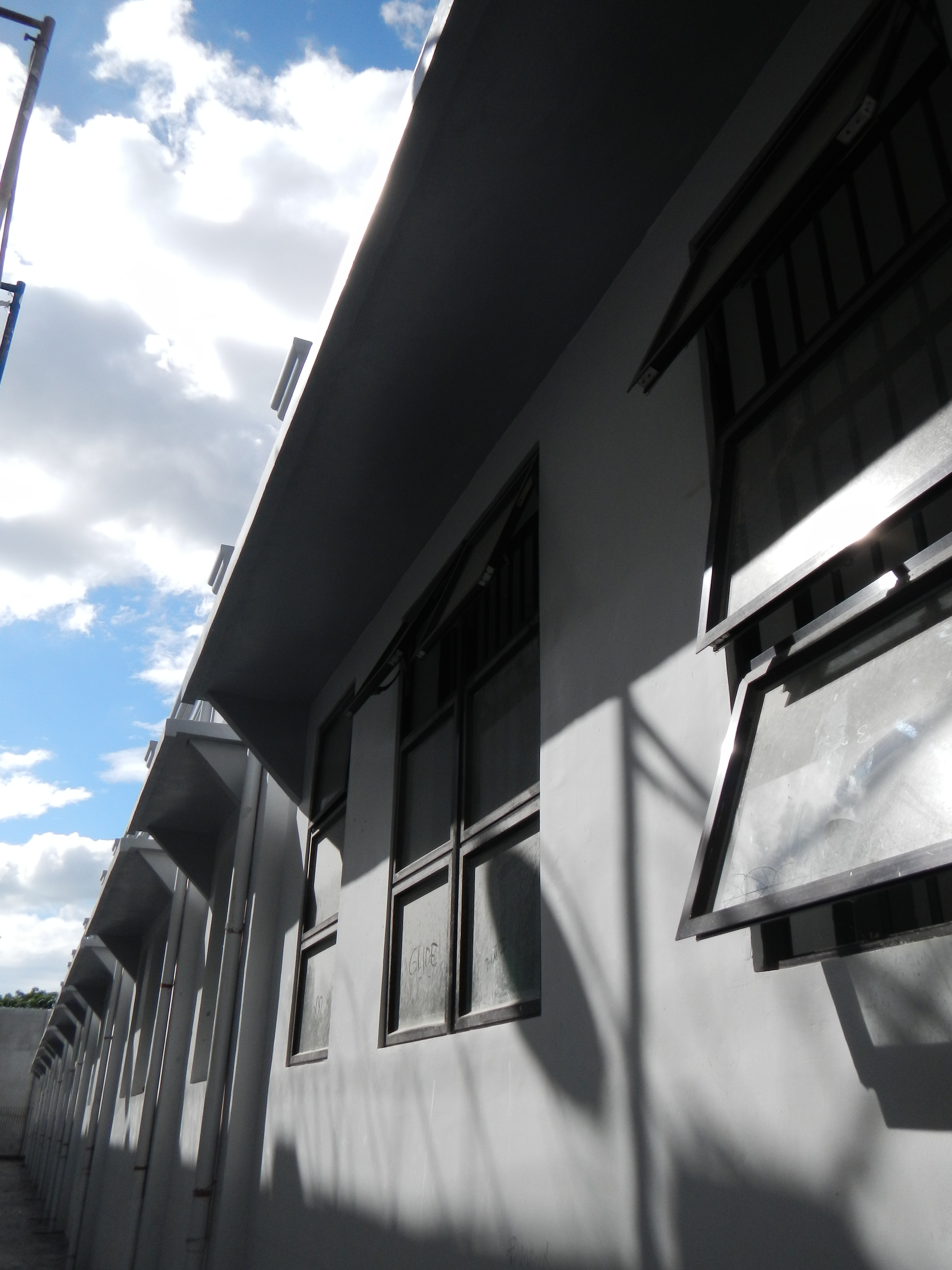
The new windows and rooms of the Jail

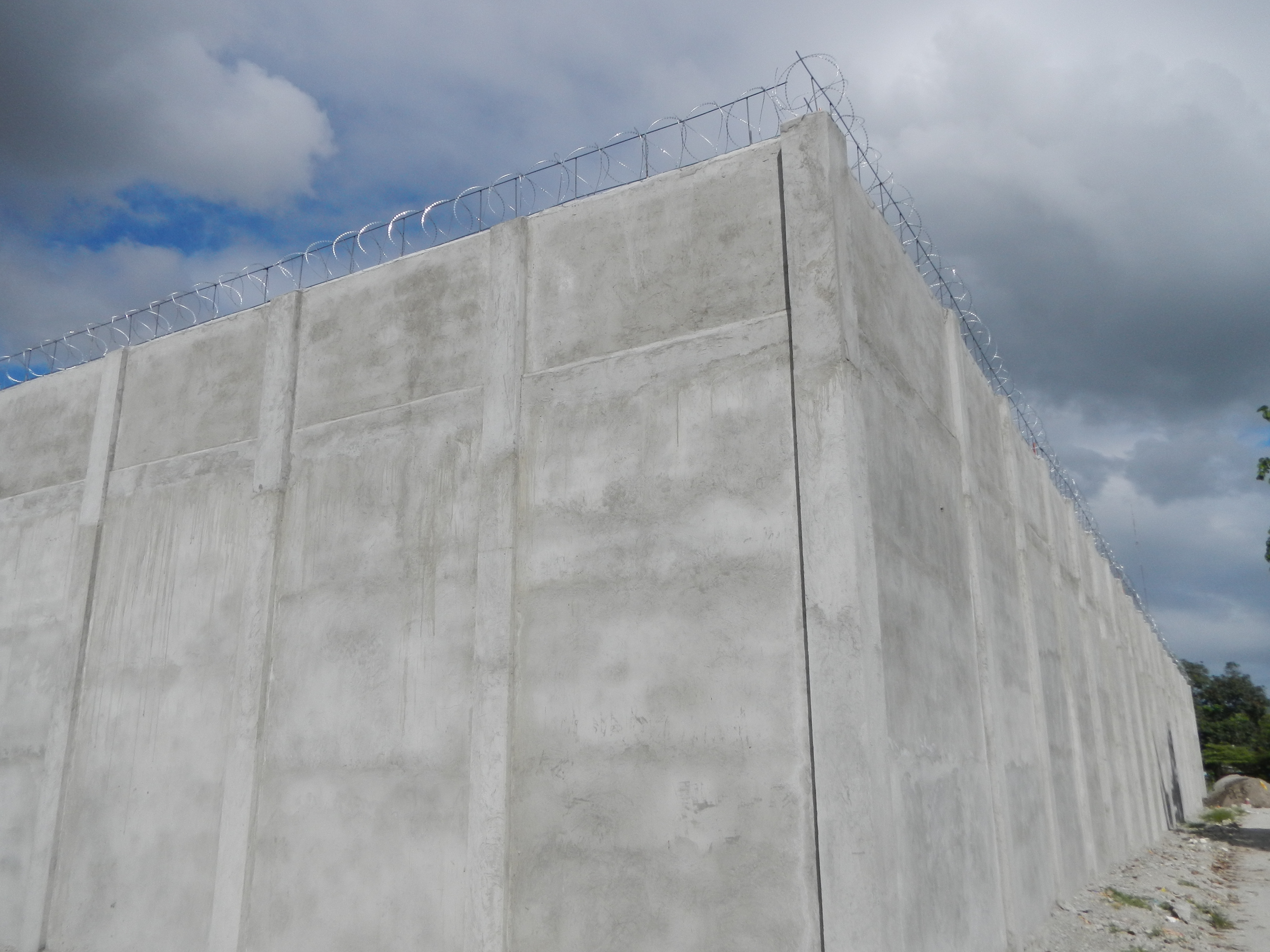
Fence
