= Bulakan Church =

Roman Catholic church in Bulacan, Philippines

- Diocesan Shrine and Parish of Nuestra Señora de la Asuncion
- Santuario Diocesano y Parroquia de Nuestra Señora de la Asuncion (Spanish)
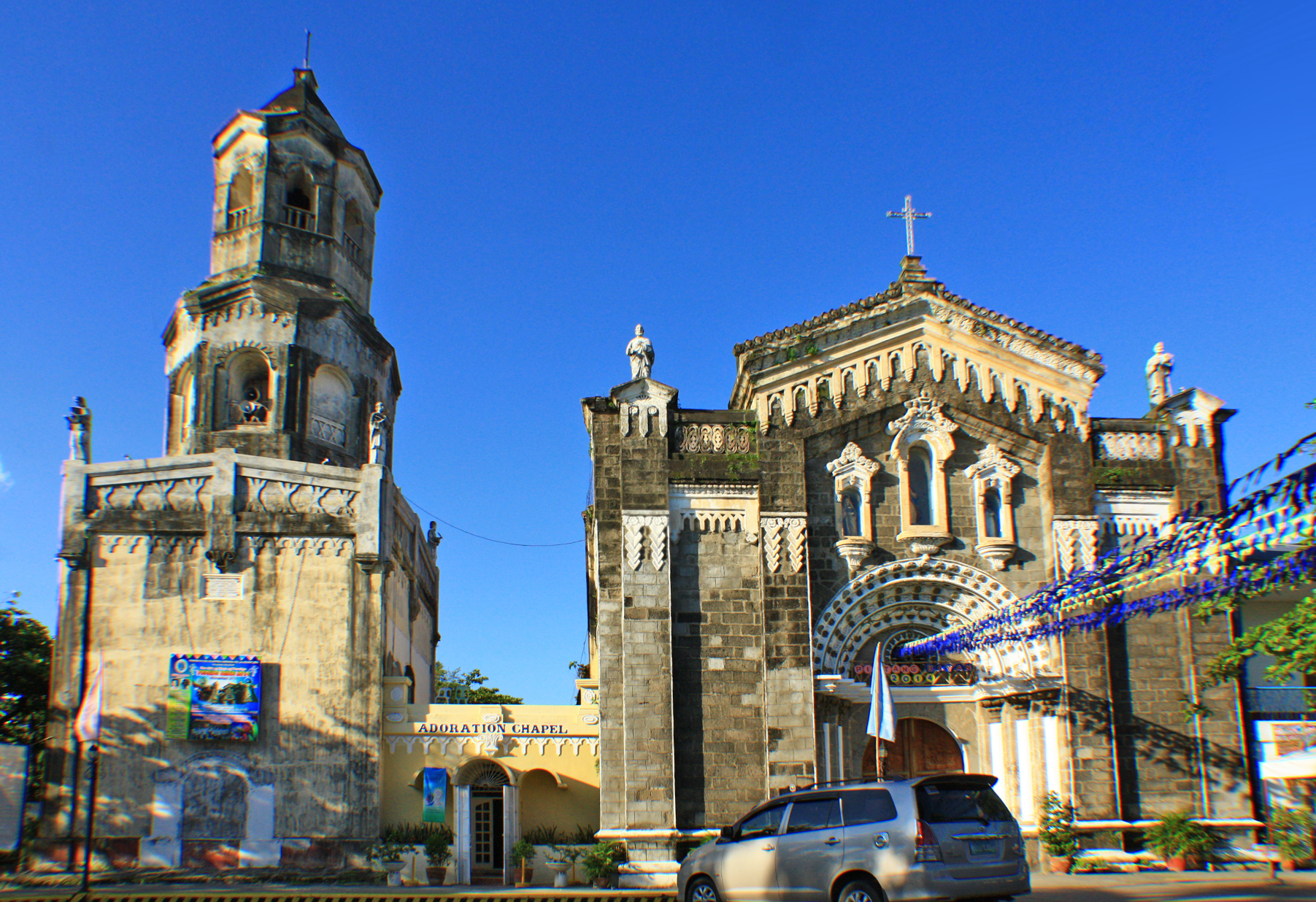
- Church facade in 2014

- Location in Bulacan Location in Luzon Location in the Philippines
- 14°47′43″N 120°52′47″E
- Location: San Jose, Bulakan, Bulacan
- Country: Philippines
- Denomination: Roman Catholic

History
- Status: Diocesan Shrine
- Founded: 1578
- Dedication: Our Lady of the Assumption

Architecture
- Functional status: Active
- Architectural type: Church building
- Style: Baroque, Neo-Romanesque

Administration
- Archdiocese: Manila
- Diocese: Malolos

Clergy
- Archbishop: His Eminence José F. Advincula Jr., D.D.
- Bishop(s): Most Rev. Dennis C. Villarojo, D.D., Ph.D.
- Priest: Rev. Msgr. Javer M. Joaquin

The Diocesan Shrine and Parish of Nuestra Señora de la Asuncion, commonly known as Bulakan Church, is a 19th-century Neo-Byzantine-Romanesque stone church located at Brgy. San Jose, in the Municipality of Bulakan (formerly spelled as Bulacan), Bulacan province, Philippines. It is one of the parishes of the Roman Catholic Diocese of Malolos under the Vicariate of the Immaculate Conception. The church was declared Marked Historical Structure of the Philippines in 2007 by the National Historical Institute, the precursor of the National Historical Commission of the Philippines. A historical marker bearing a brief history of the church was installed by the commission.

== History ==
=== Parish church ===
The parish and the first church was established by the Augustinian Fathers in 1575 as a sub-parish of Tondo. In 1578, the town of Bulakan was proclaimed a separate parish from Tondo. According to the historical marker, during the British invasion in 1762 the Bulakan Church was razed by fire. The construction of the present church and convent was started in 1812 by Father Gaspar Folgar, OSA. The church had sustained damages due to various natural calamities: earthquakes on June 3, 1863; October 1, 1869; and the Luzon earthquakes of 1880, which heavily damaged structures not only Bulakan town but most of Luzon Island.

The church was subsequently repaired after experiencing damages: major repairs on the earthquake-damaged bell tower in 1877 by Father Marcos Hernandez, OSA (through the planning and construction of Don Ramon Hermosa and Don Jose Fuentes – a plaque commemorating the builders of the tower can be seen at the first level of the bell tower façade); and in 1884 when Father Francisco Valdes, OSA rebuilt the church after the 1880 earthquake. The present style of the church can be attributed to his repairs. Finally, Father Patricio Martin, OSA finished the restoration of the church in 1885, with Father Domingo de la Prieta finishing the bell tower’s restoration in 1889.

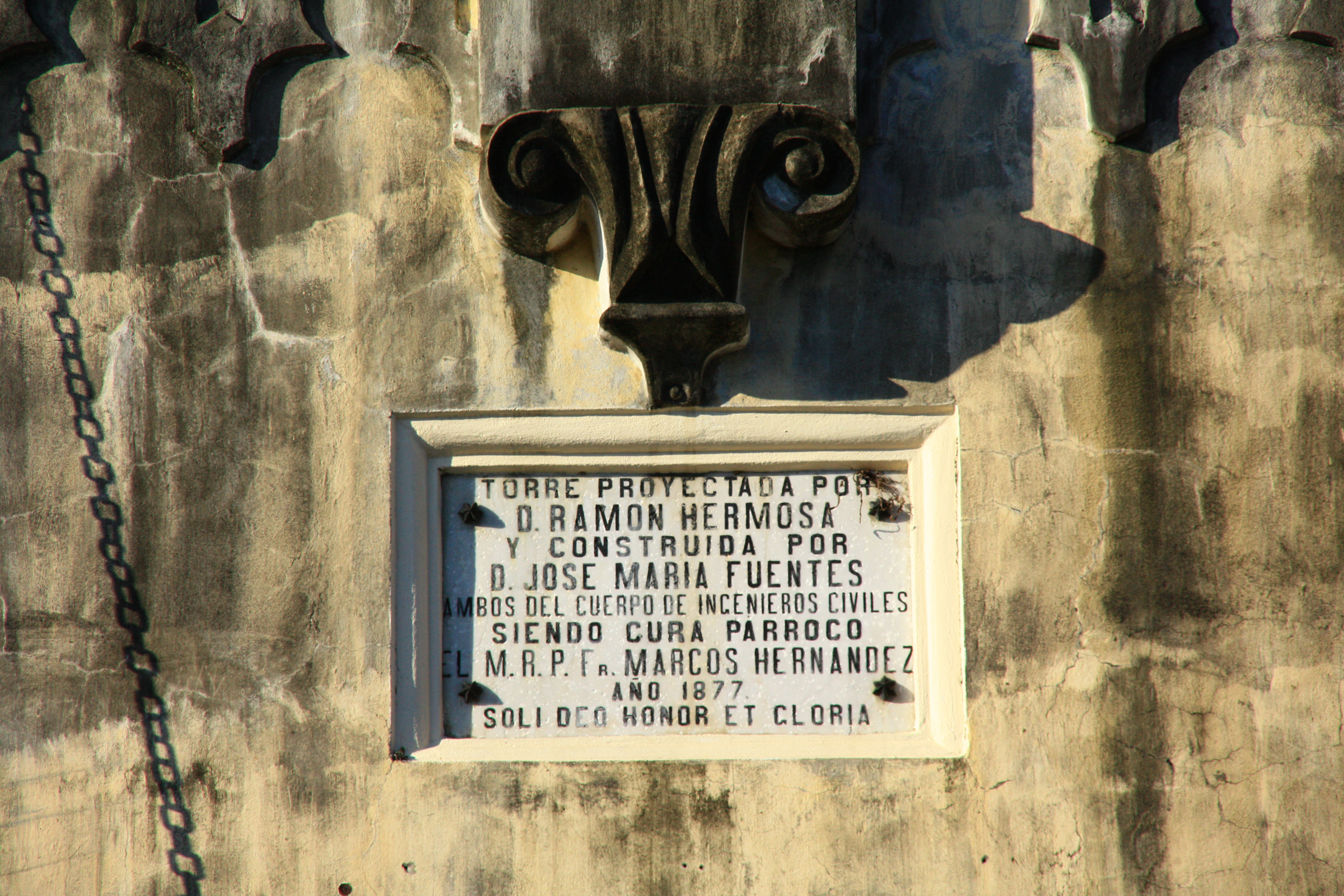
Plaque commemorating the rebuilding of the bell tower in 1877

The church is the site where Filipino general Gregorio del Pilar secretly distributed the pamphlets made by his uncle, Marcelo H. del Pilar, a prominent member of the Propaganda Movement during the late 1800s.

=== Architectural history ===
The following list summarizes the priests who managed the parish and made significant changes to the church structure during the Spanish occupation of the Philippines:

- Fr. Gaspar Folgar - He rebuilt the church and convent in 1812.
- Fr. Marcos Hernandez - During his term the construction of a new bell tower started in 1877. The previous tower tilted after the earthquake of 1869. The new tower was designed by Ramon Hermosa and constructed by Jose Maria Fuentes, both from the Civil Engineers Corps (Cuerpo de ingenieros civiles).
- Fr. Francisco Valdes - He rebuilt the church in a Neo-Byzantine Romanesque style starting in 1884 after it was damaged by the earthquake of 1880.
- Fr. Patricio Martin - He finished the restoration work in 1885.
- Fr. Domingo de la Prieta - The bell tower was completed in 1889 during his term.

== Architectural features ==
The whole facade stands on a base block, or a plinth. Although it has been in accordance to Neo-Classical Style during the late 1800s, the church has incorporated a mixture of architectural styles including:

=== Romanesque architectural features ===
- Presence of corbeled arches, found underneath the raking cornice and upper part of the side walls.
- Presence of decorative scrolls, volutes, vines, and floral motifs - carved on the corbeled arches.
- Presence of three niches with statues above the corbeled arches.
- Presence of a rose window above the main doorway.
- Receding planes of the jamb with three orders at the main doorway.
- The upper part of the square pillar is designed with bricks in chevron pattern.

=== Muslim architectural feature ===
- Embellishments located at the pediment.

== Present condition ==
After several interventions from the preceding parish priests, Bulakan Church was restored from 1955 up to 1975. During the recent years, relevant changes had been made to the church structure including the replacement of the Mudejar-style main door with one depicting the history of the town and its patron saints done by local artist A. Magtoto. A new retablo or altarpiece replaced the 1950s altarpiece that resembles the recessed arch on the church's facade. Major repairs were also done on the bell tower.

Some of the recent renovations on the Bulakan Church

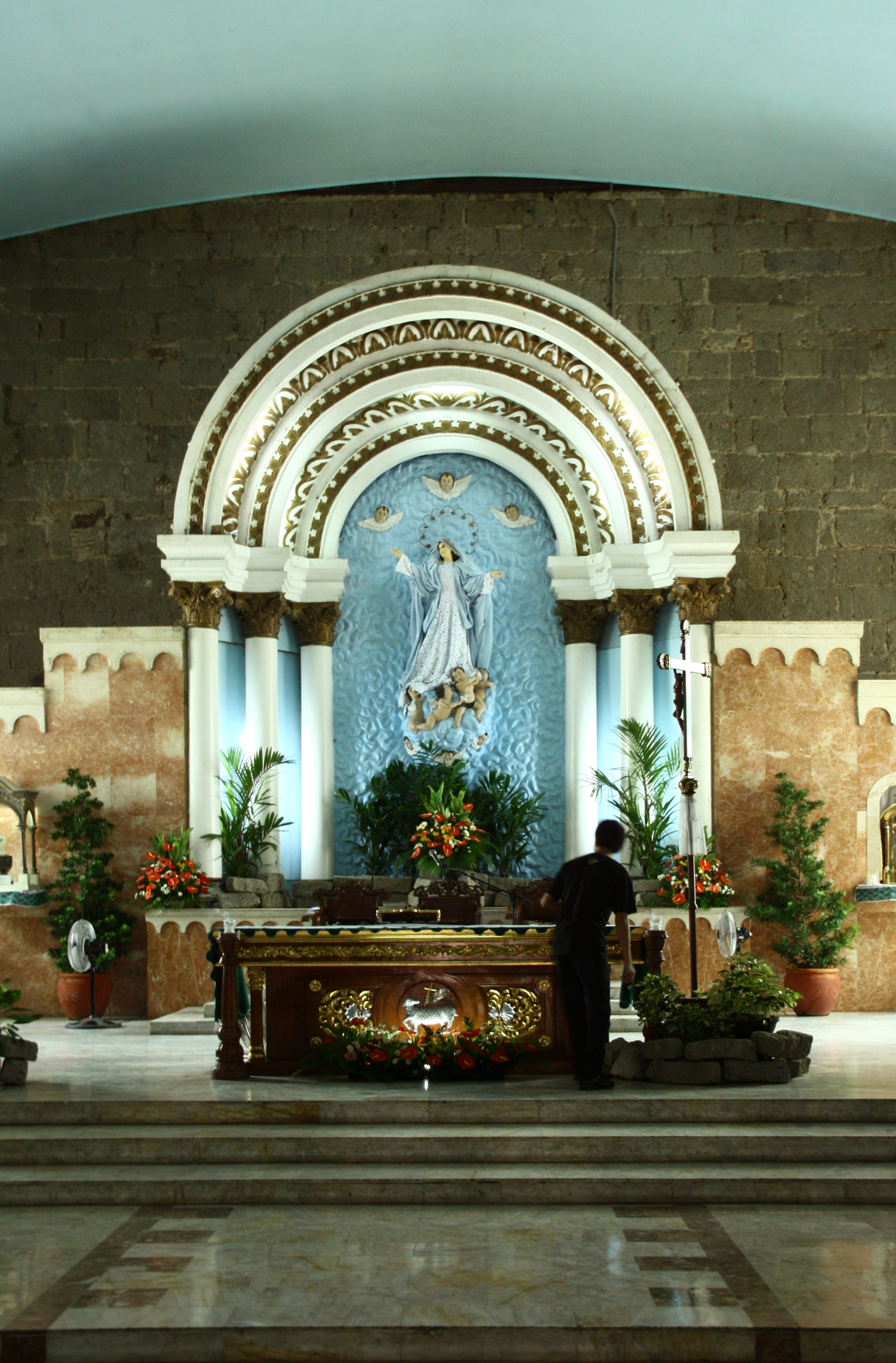
Altarpiece circa 1950s

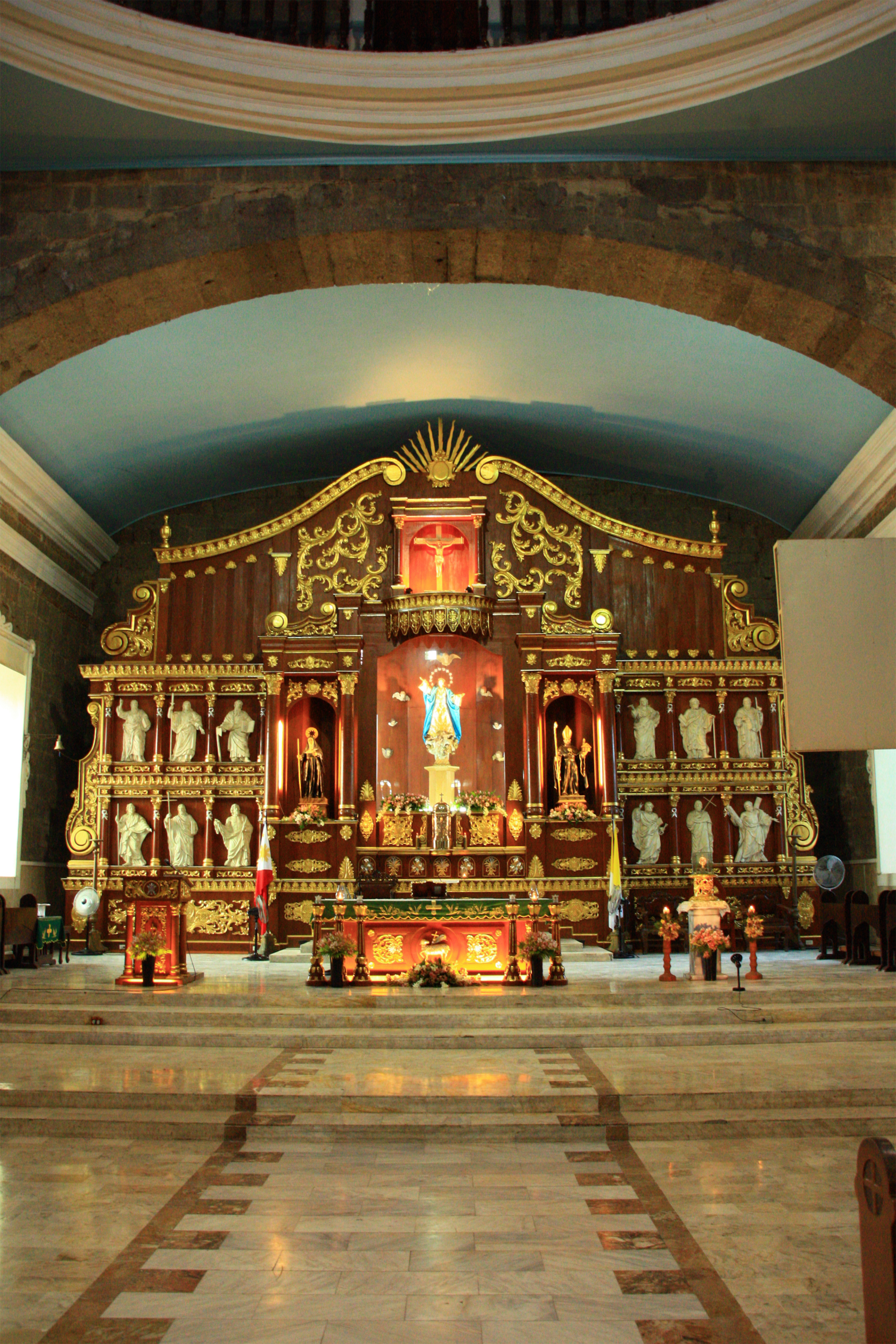
New altarpiece installed in 2013

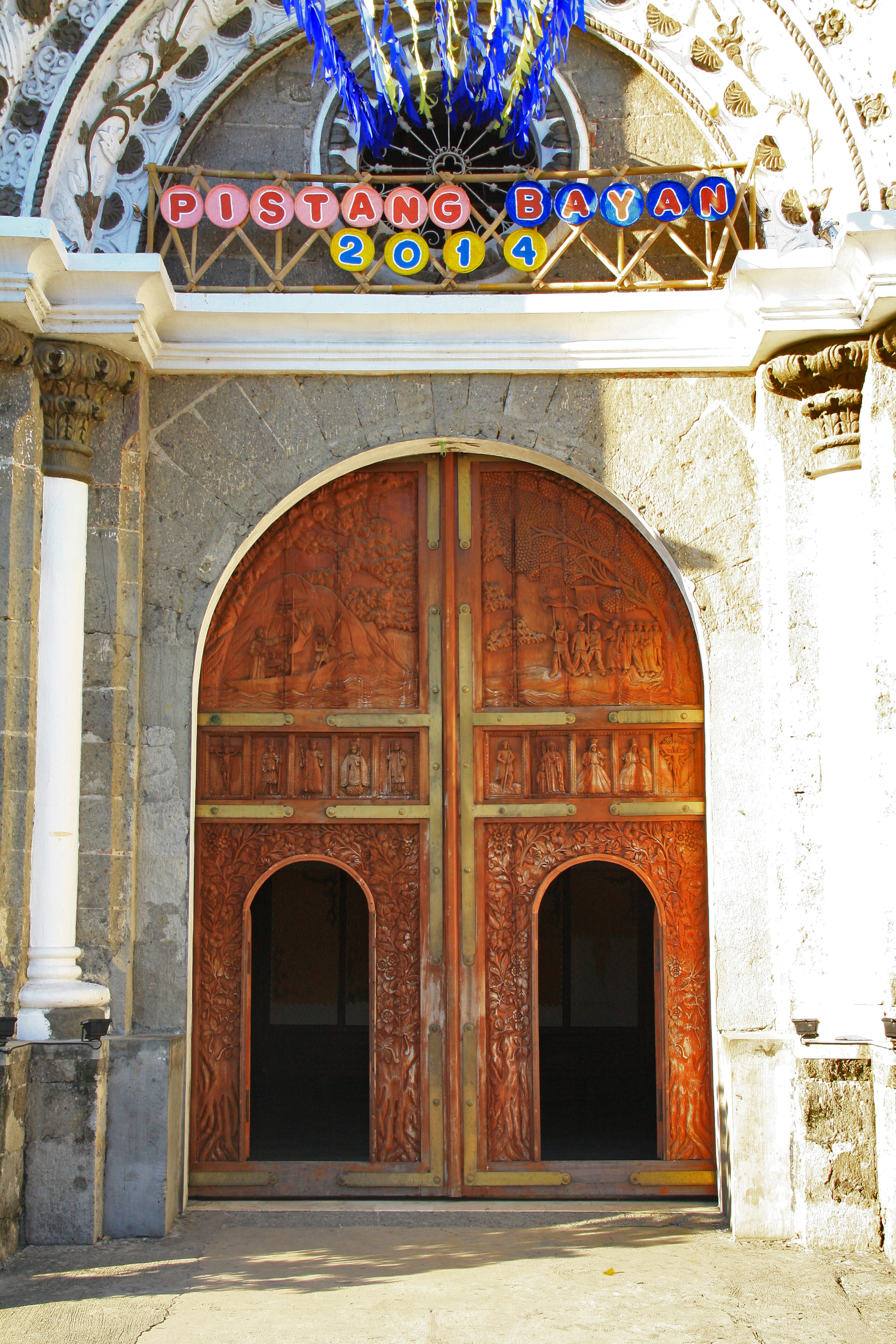
Main door installed in 2012

== Historical marker ==
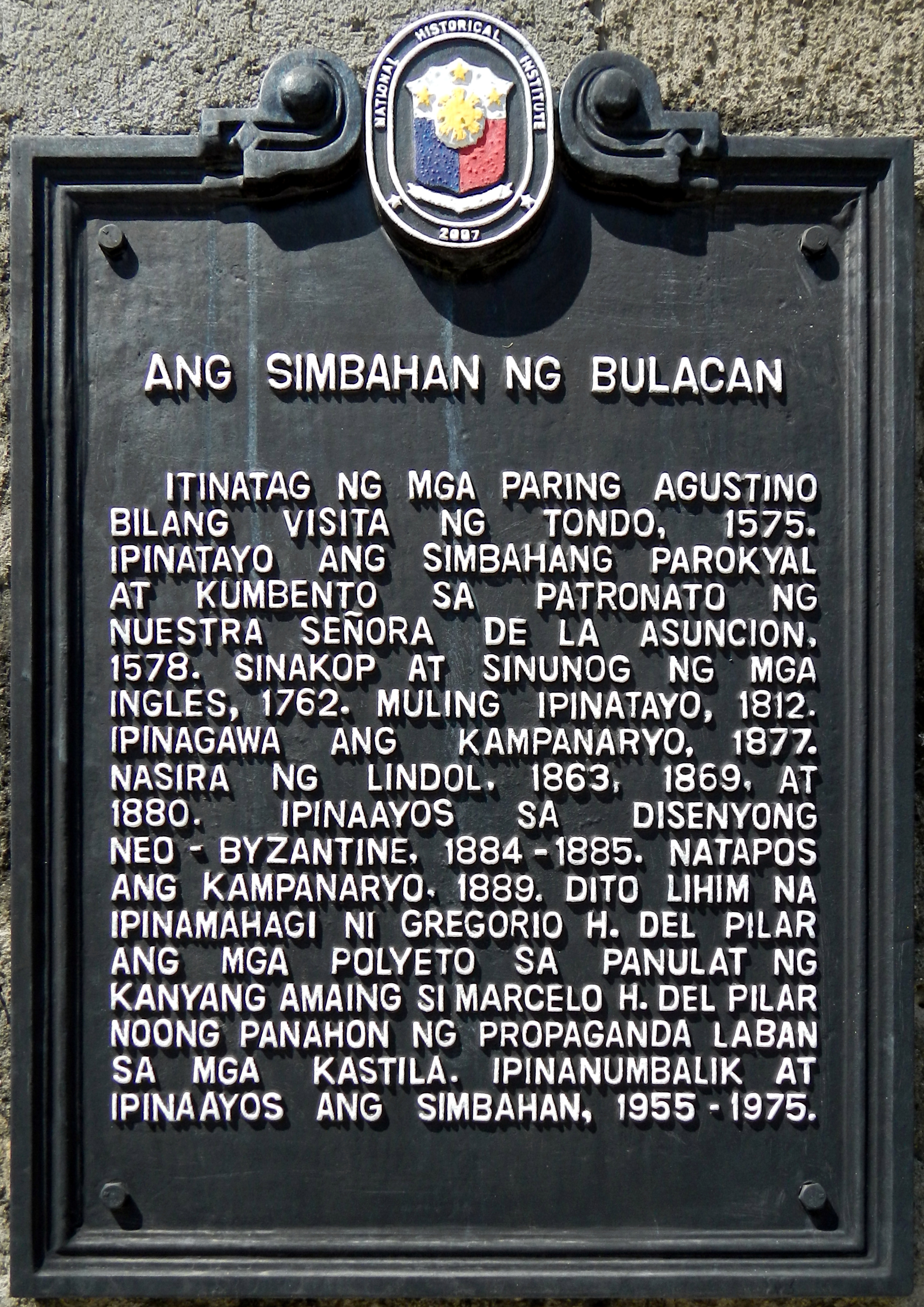
Church NHI historical marker installed in 2007

The marker installed by the National Historical Commission of the Philippines in 2007 declaring Bulacan Church as a Marked Historical Structure of the Philippines.

"Ang Simbahan ng Bulacan." (In Filipino)
Itinatag ng mga paring Agustino bilang visita ng Tondo, 1575. Ipinatayo ang simbahang parokyal at kumbento sa patronato ng Nuestra Señora de la Asuncion, 1578.. Sinakop at sinunog ng mga Ingles, 1762. Muling ipinatayo, 1812. Ipinagawa and kampanaryo, 1877. Nasira ng lindol, 1863, 1869, at 1880. Ipinaayos sa disenyong Neo-Byzaltine, 1884-1885. Natapos ang kampanaryo, 1889. Dito lihim na ipinamahagi ni Gregorio H. del Pilar ang mga polyeto sa panulat ng kanyang amaing Marcelo H. del Pilar noong panahon ng propaganda laban sa mga Kastila. Ipinanumbalik at ipinaayos ang simbahan, 1955-1975.

"The Church of Bulacan." (English translation)
Established by the Augustinians as a sub-parish of Tondo, 1575. The parish church and convent was built under the patronage or Our Lady of the Assumption, 1578. Conquered and burnt by the British, 1762. Built again in 1812. Bell tower constructed, 1877. Damaged by earthquakes, 1863, 1869, AT 1880. Renovated in the Neo-Byzantine style, 1884-1885. Bell tower was completed, 1889. In here, Gregorio H. del Pilar secretly distributed the pamphlets written by his uncle Marcelo H. del Pilar during the propaganda period against the Spaniards. The church was restored and renovated, 1955-1975.

== Gallery ==
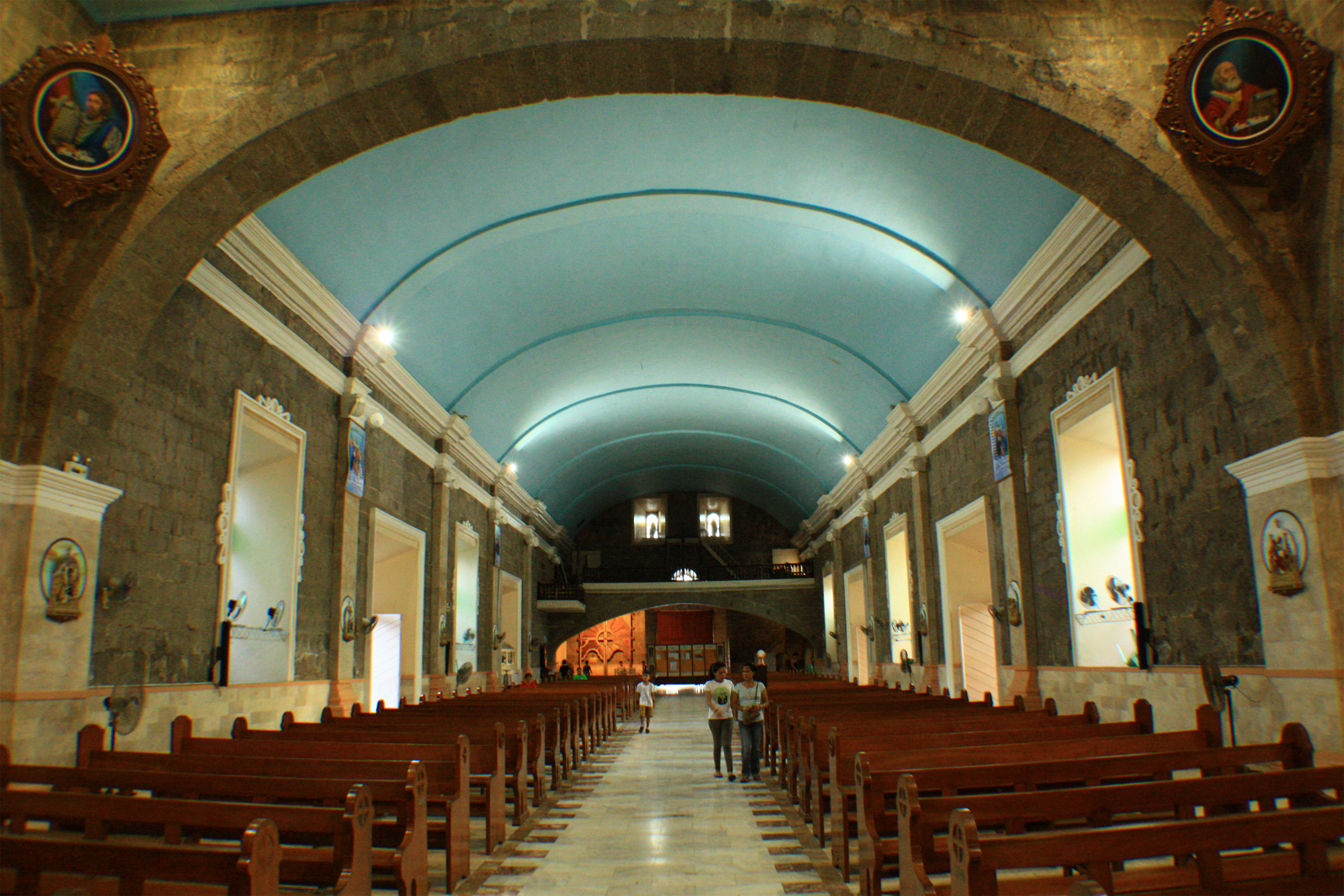
View of the nave from under the dome

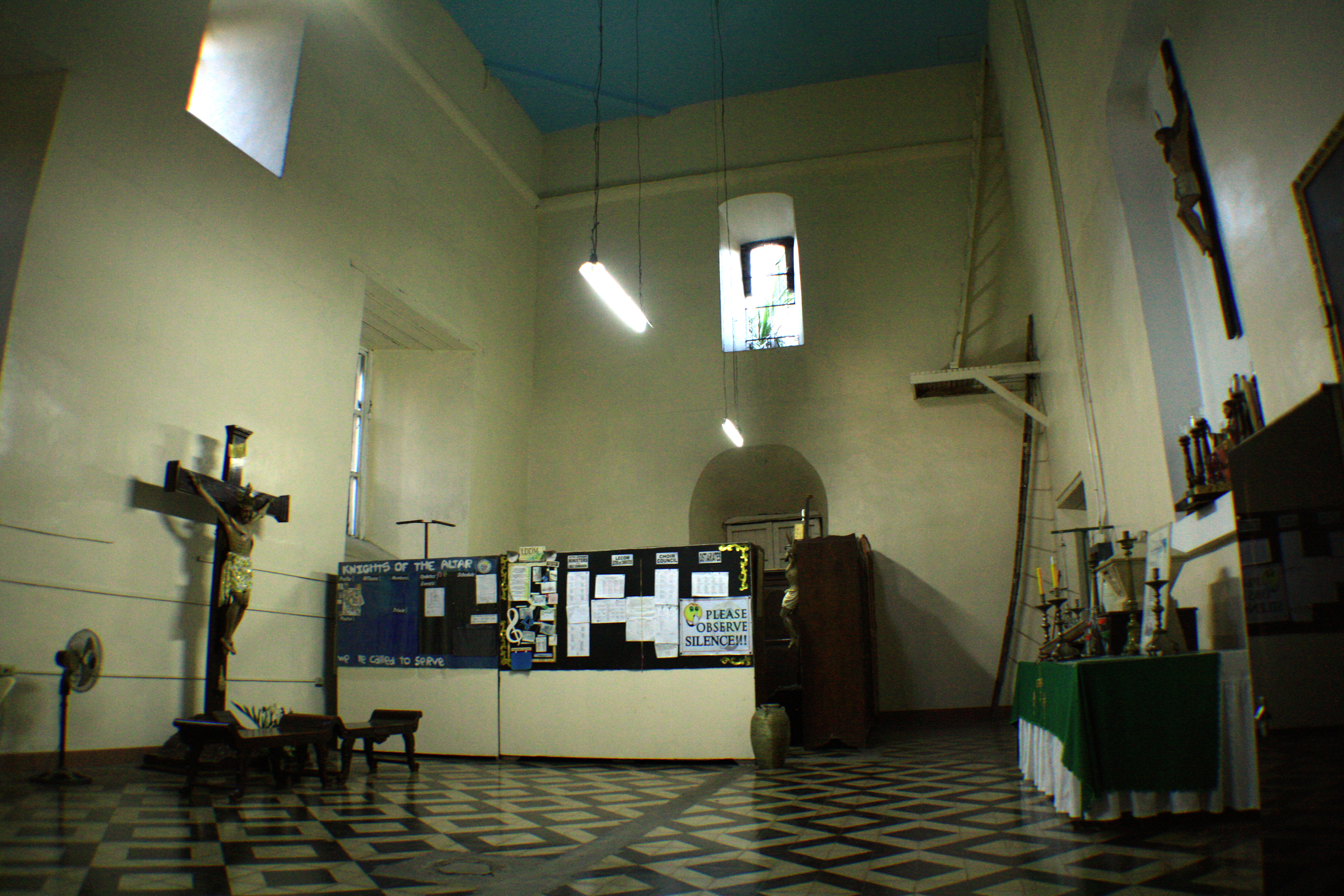
View inside the sacristy

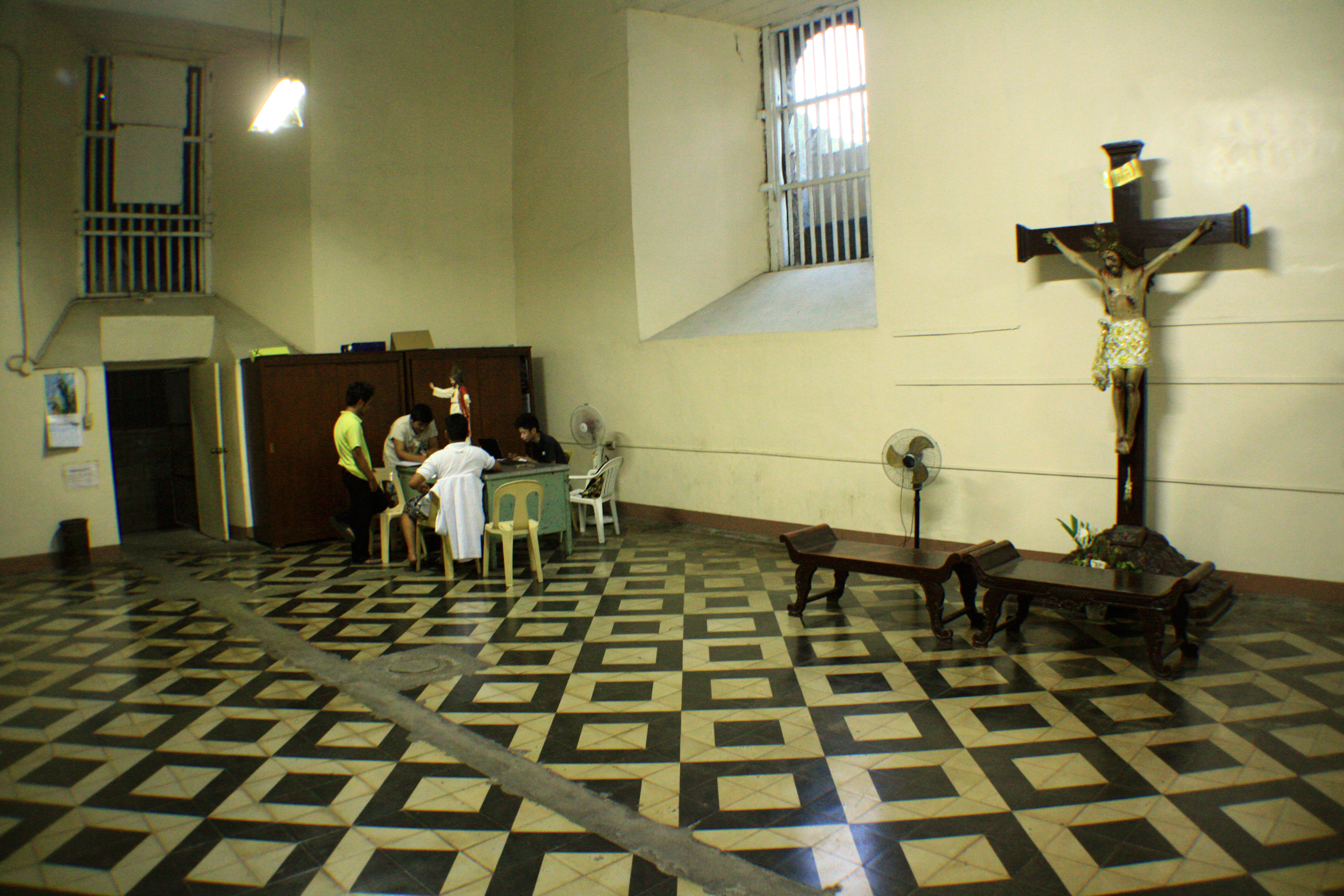
Alternate view of the sacristy

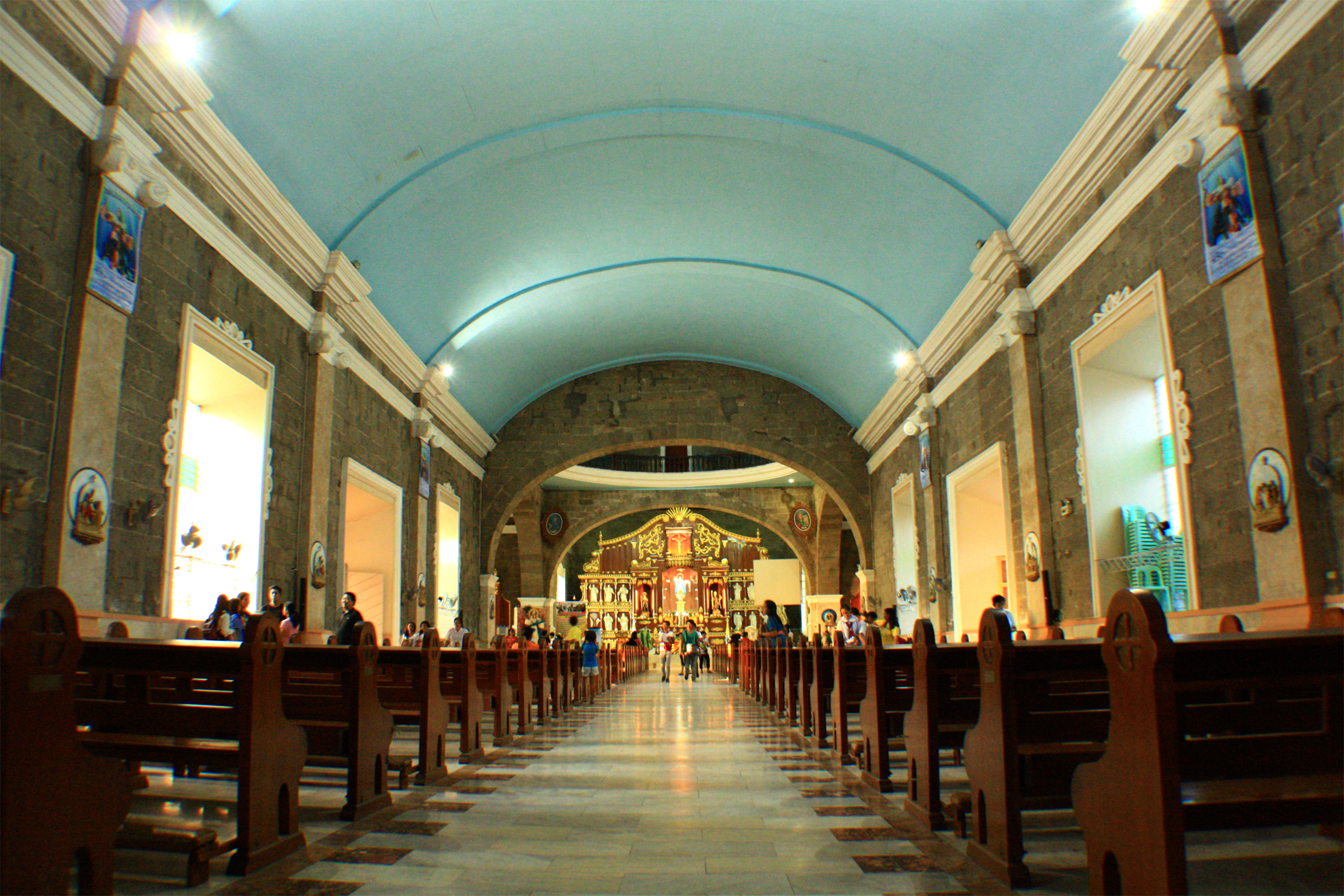
View of the church nave from under the choir loft

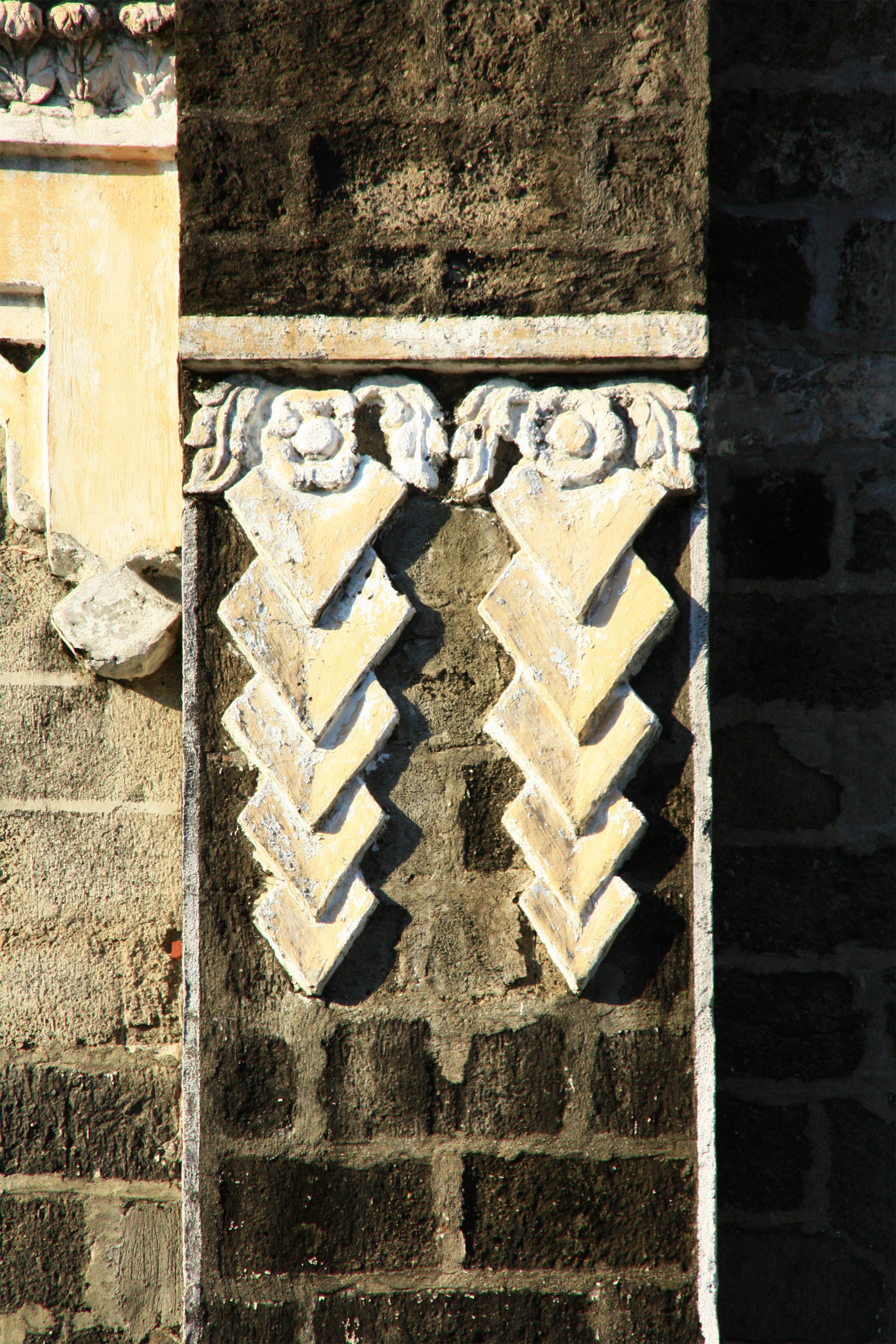
Details of the facade moldings

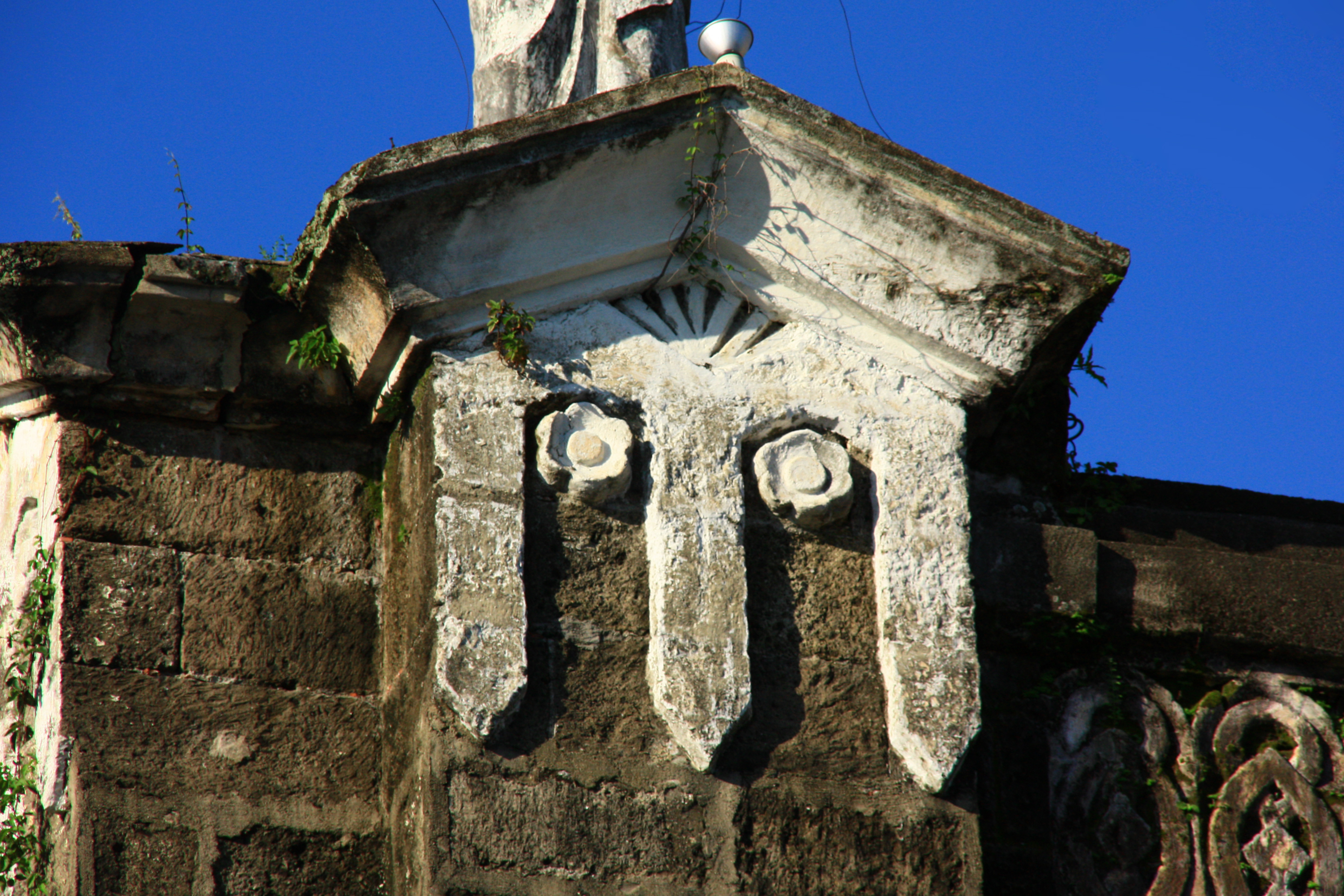
Details of the facade pediment

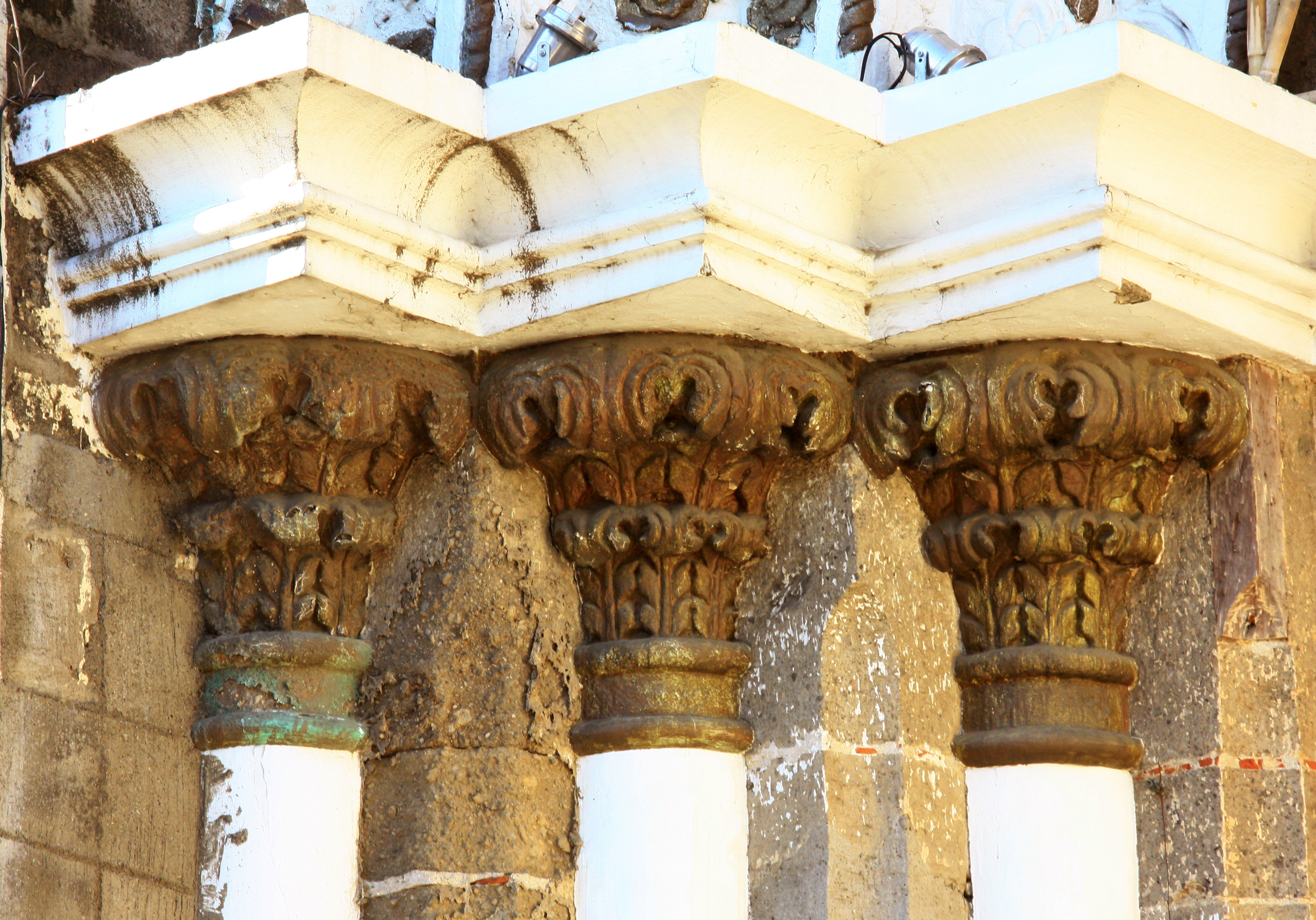
Details of the Pseudo-Corinthian capitals

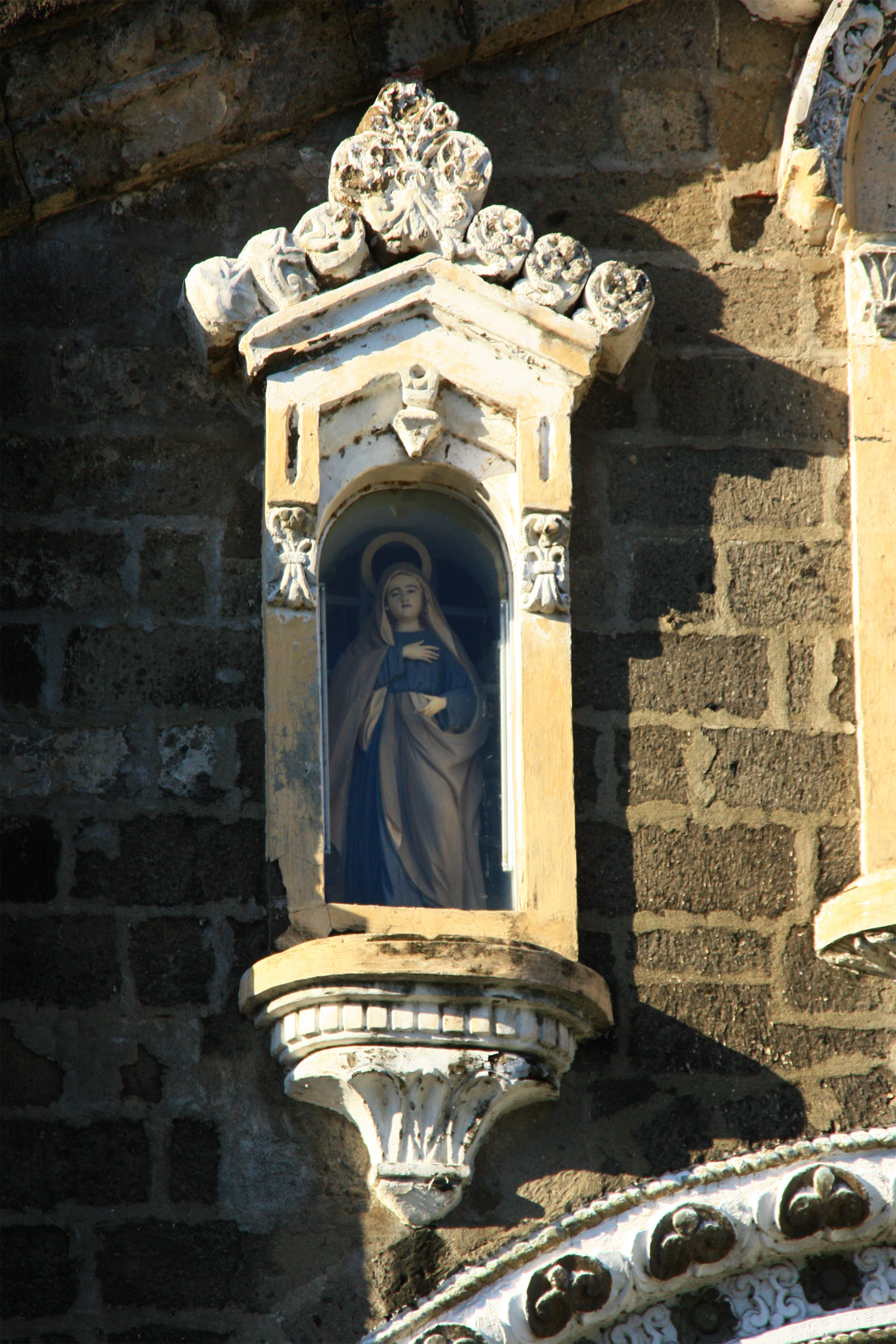
Details of the saint's niche on the facade

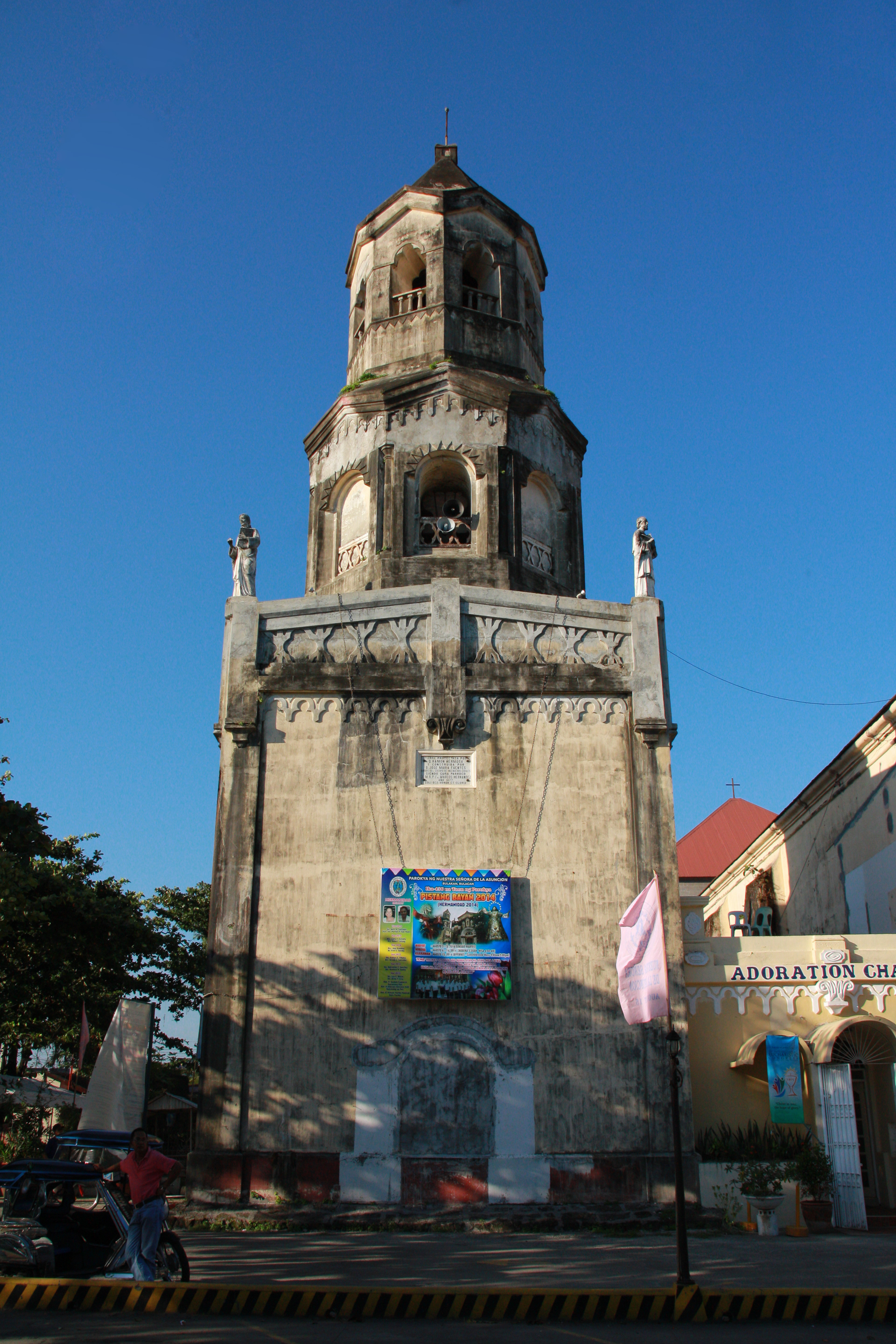
Slender 3-level, Mudejar-style bell tower

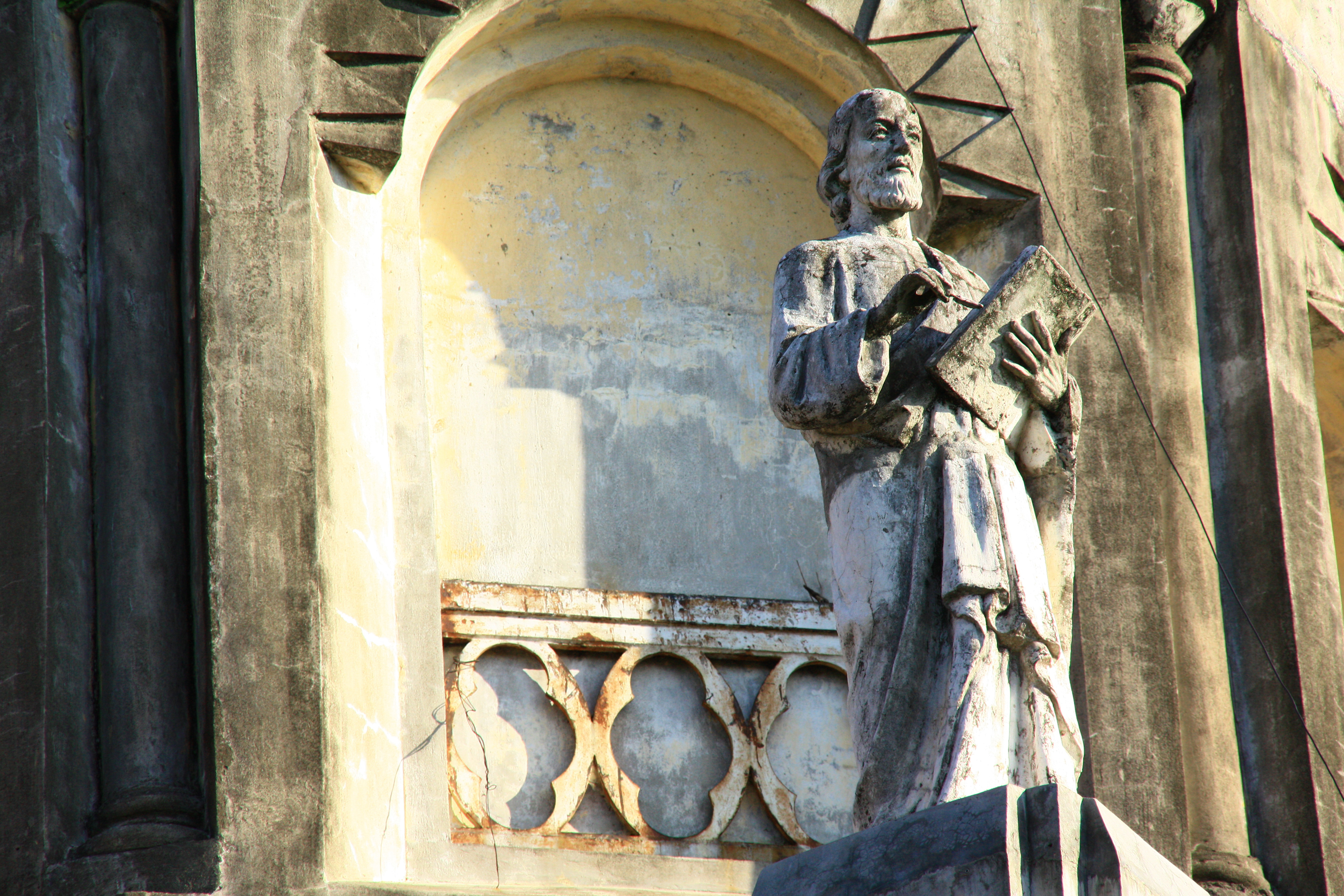
Details of one of the Evangelist statues on the bell tower

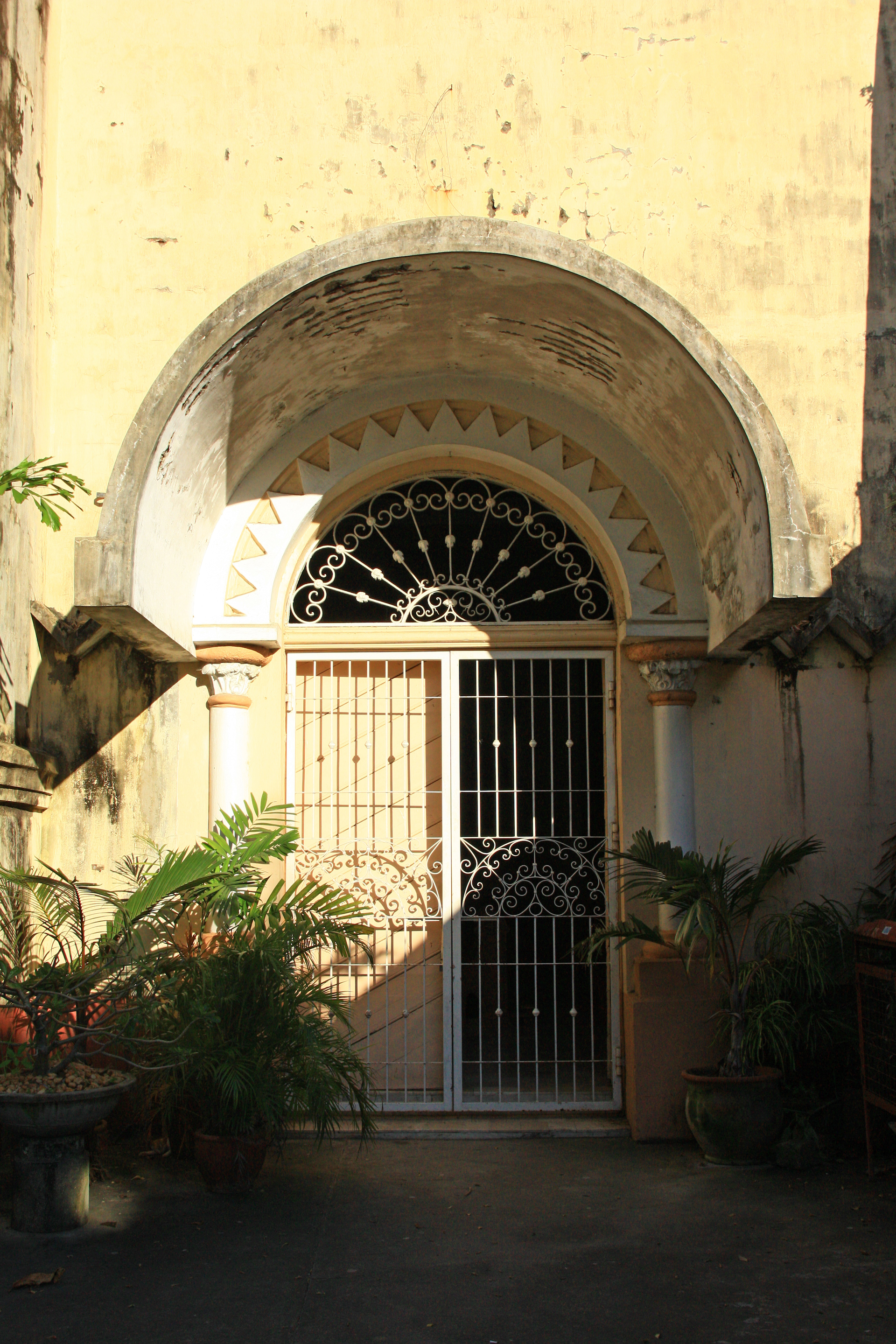
Side portal

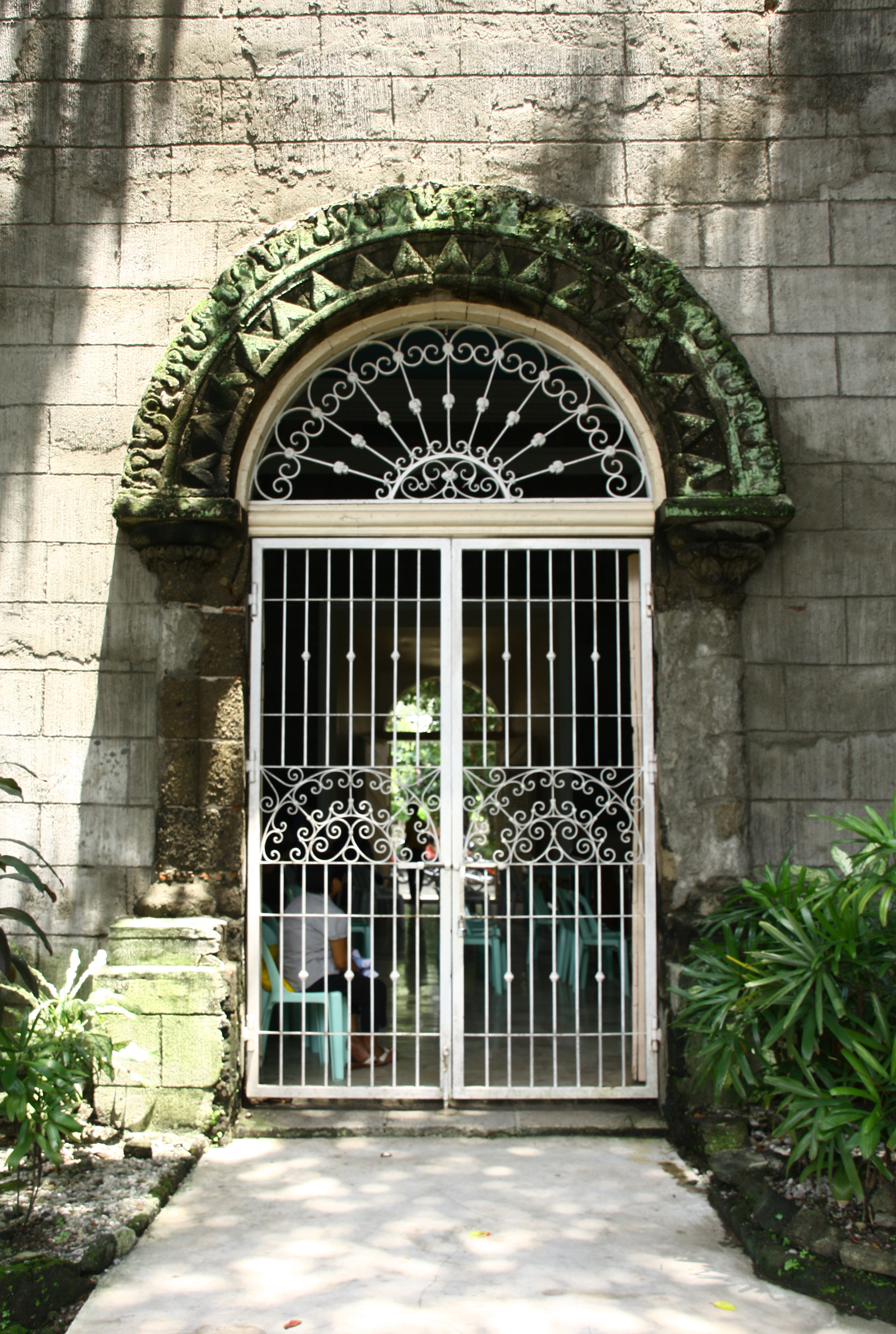
Side portal showing the details of the stone arch relief

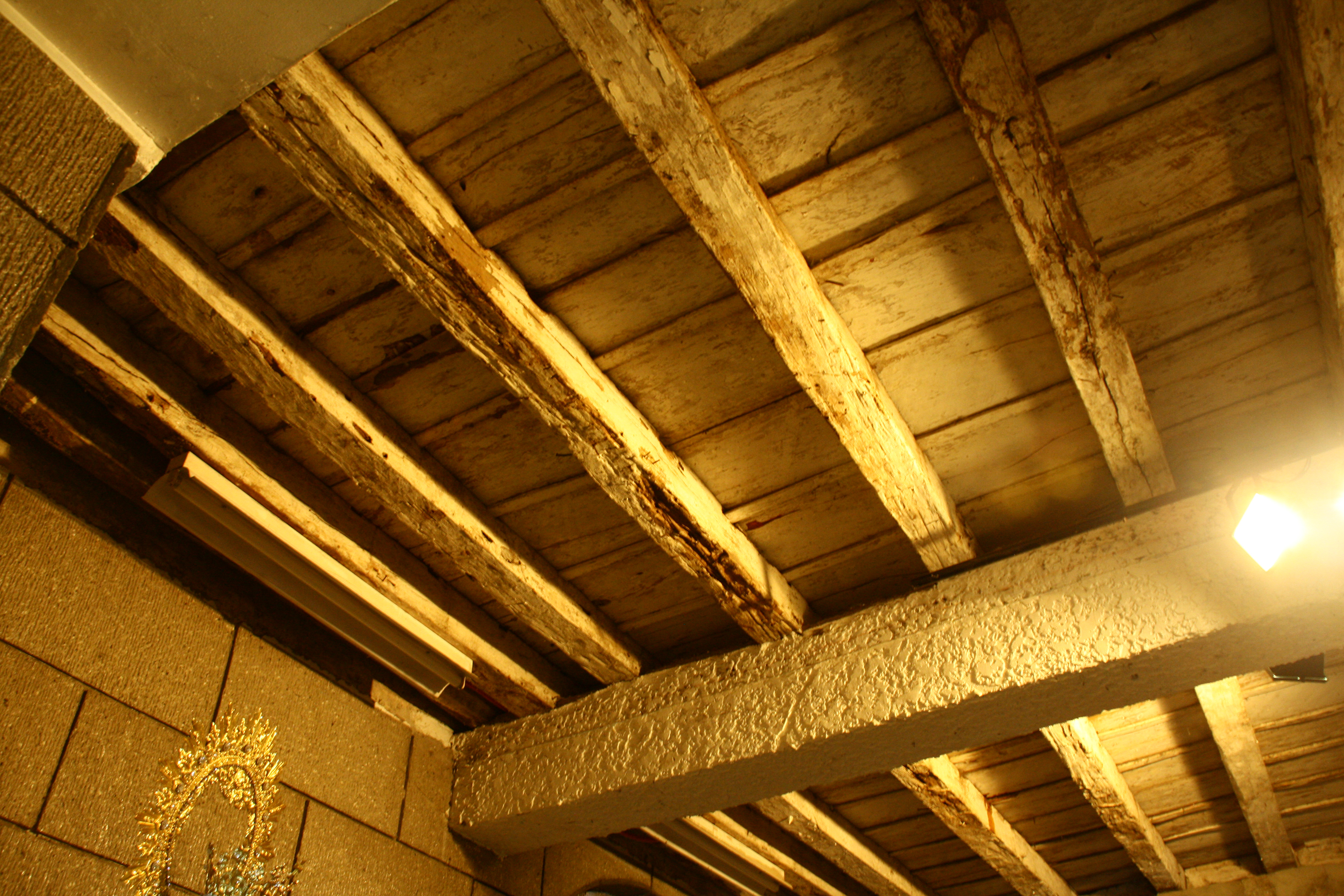
Wooden beams on the convent

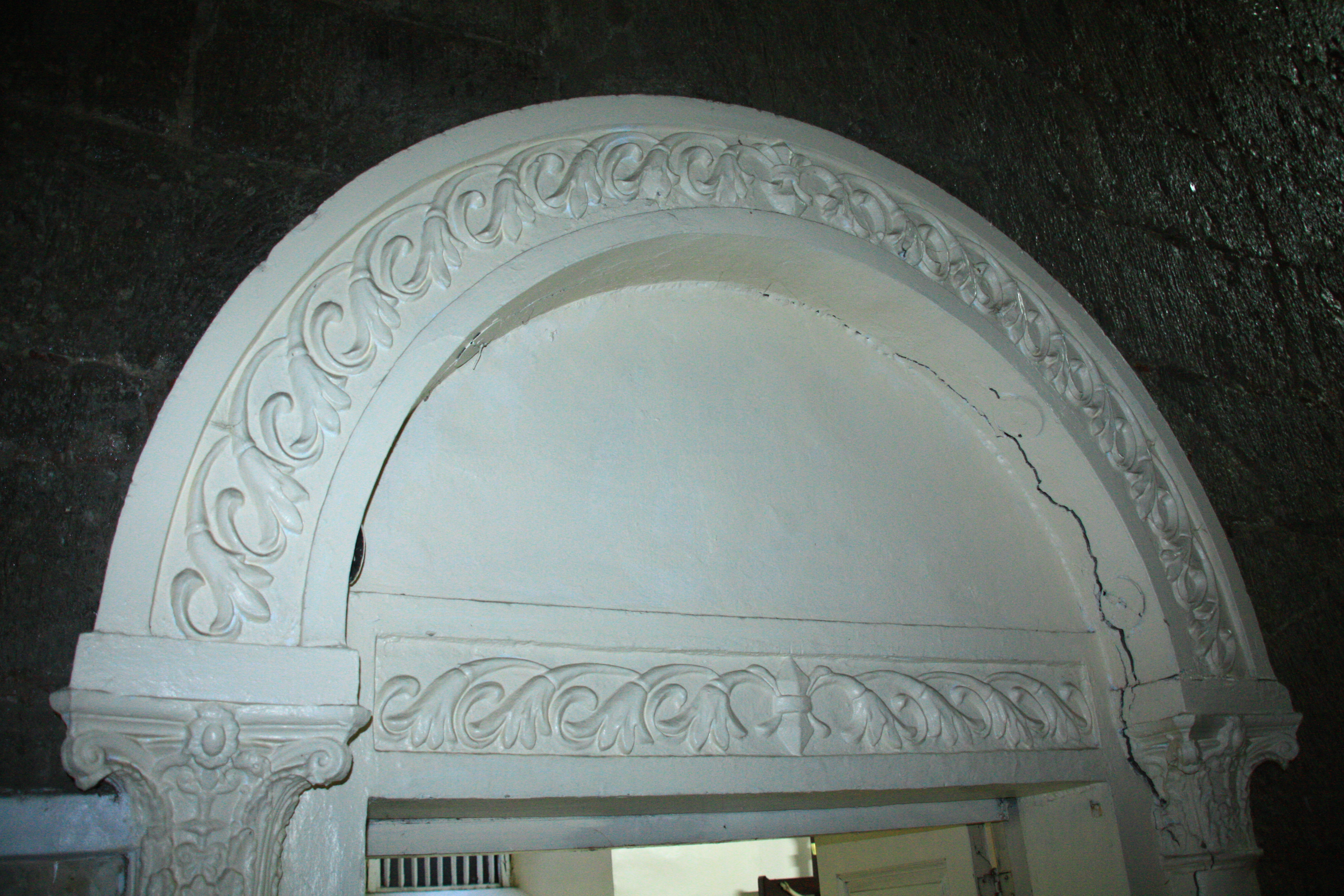
Details of a concrete arch doorway leading to the sacristy

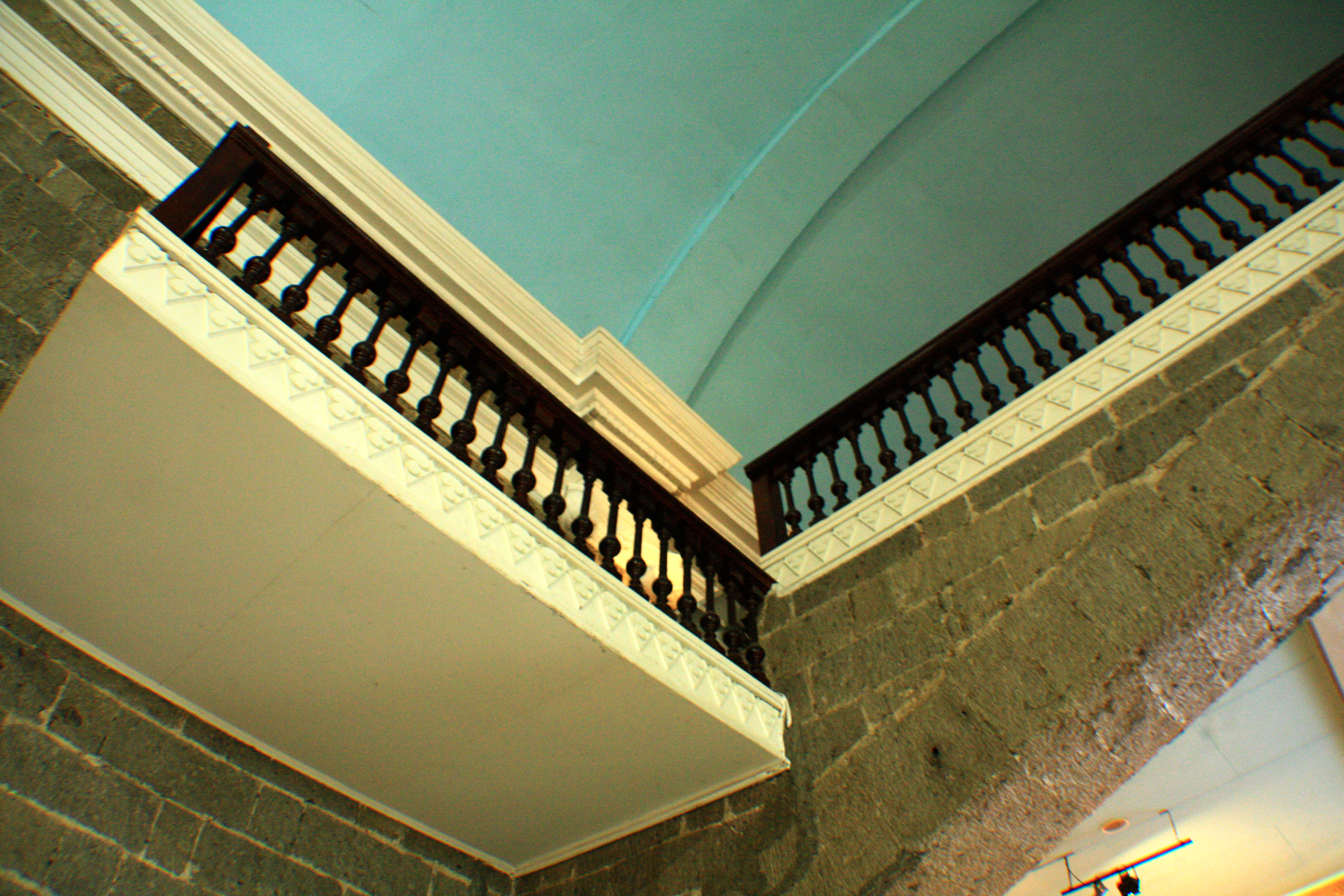
Choir loft balustrade

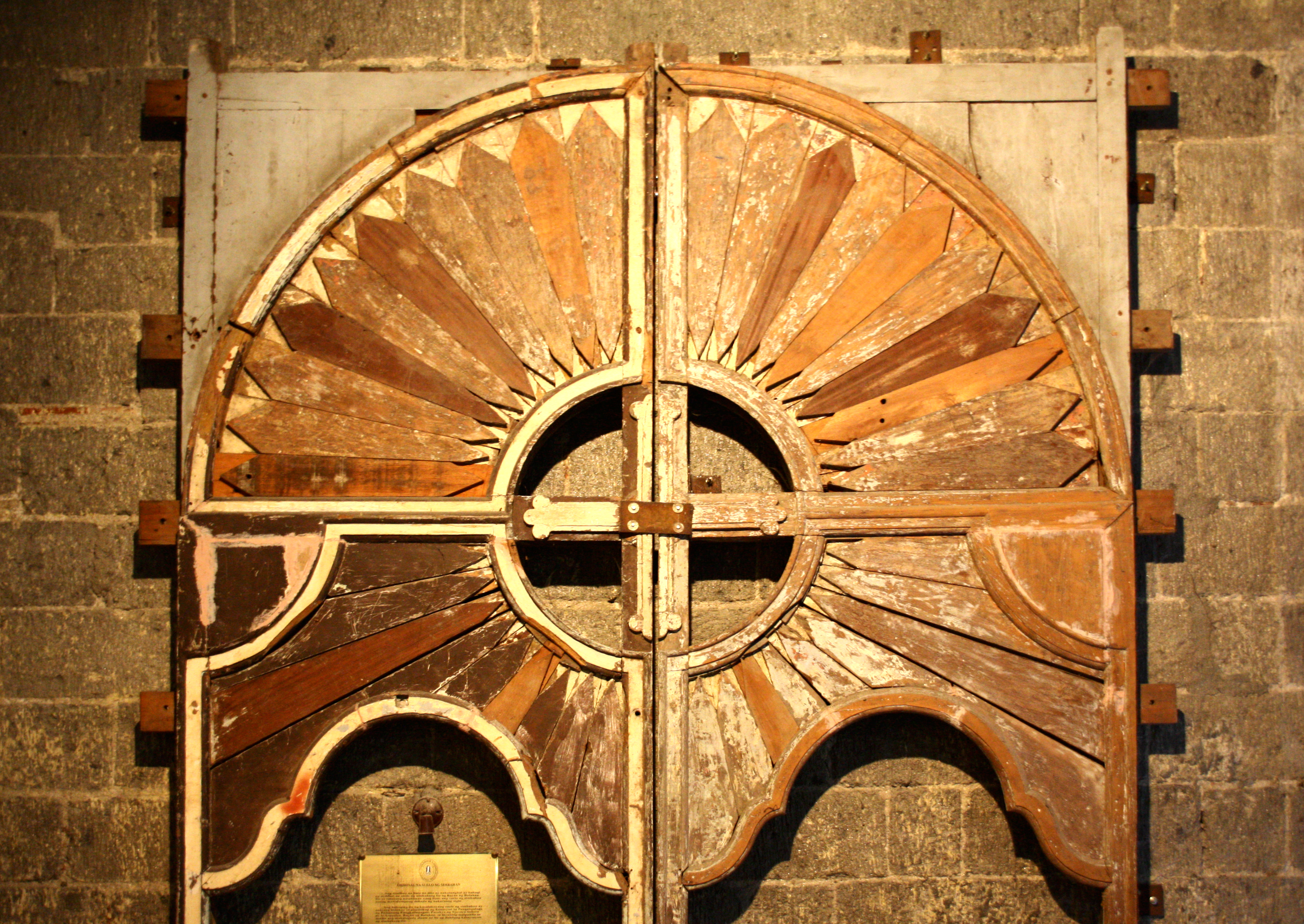
Old Mudejar-style hardwood door currently displayed under the choir loft

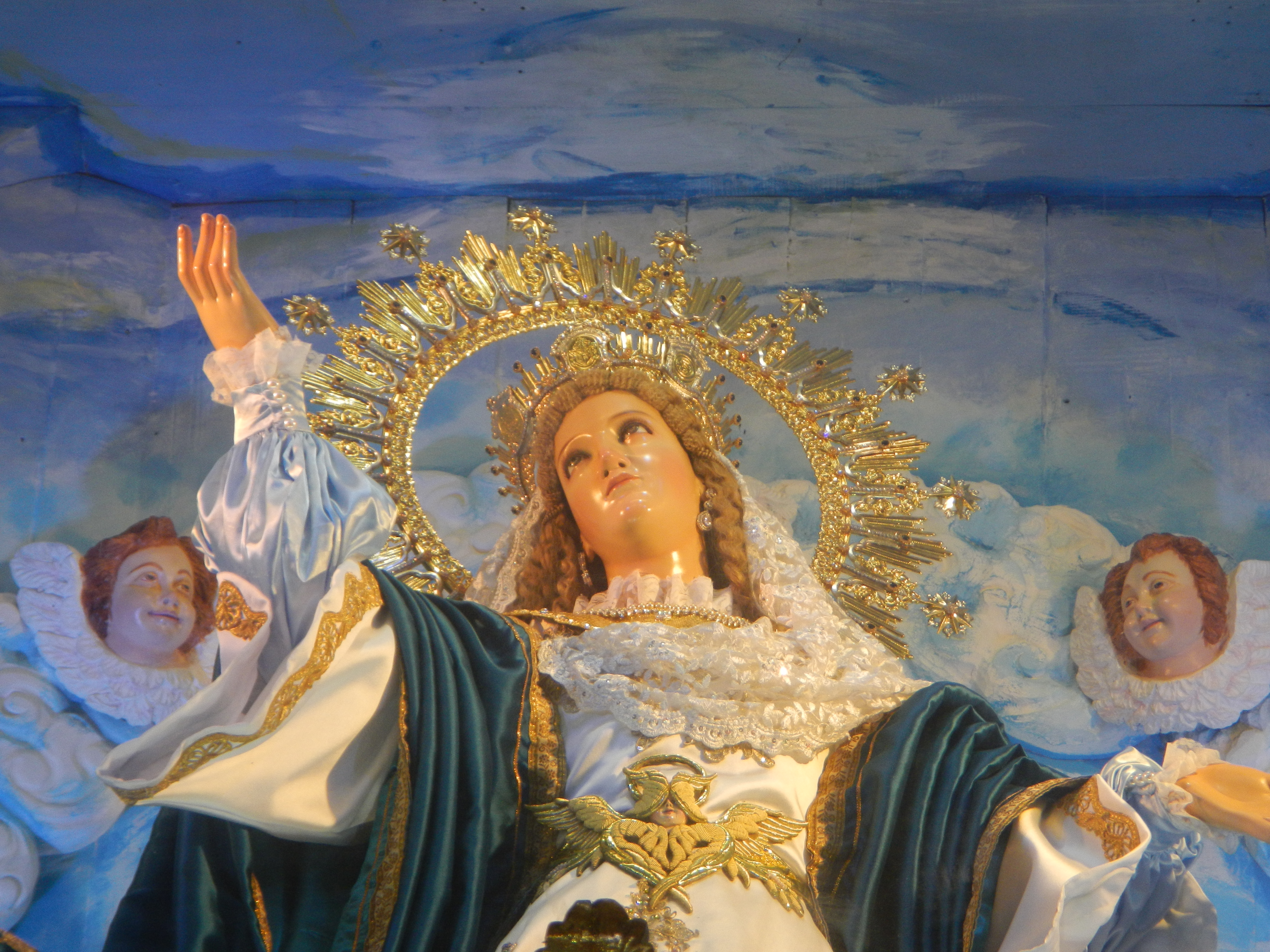
The venerated image of Our Lady of the Assumption that was granted a decree of Episcopal Coronation
