= Hermosa Church =

Catholic church in Bataan, Philippines

- Saint Peter of Verona Parish Church
- Parokya ng San Pedro Martir de Verona (Filipino)
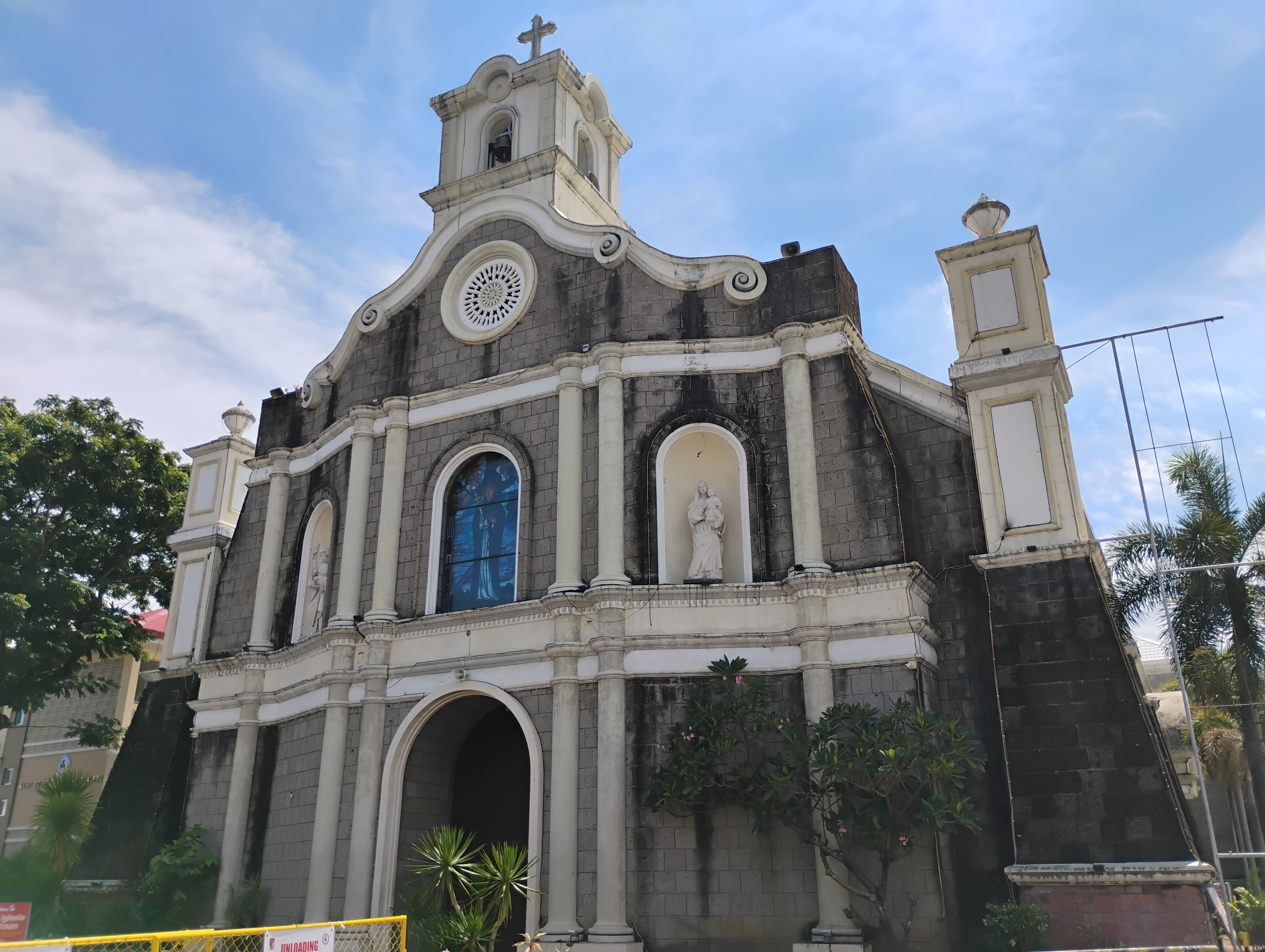
- Church facade in 2025

- Location in Luzon Location in the Philippines
- 14°49′48.07″N 120°30′28.58″E
- Location: Hermosa, Bataan
- Country: Philippines
- Denomination: Catholic

History
- Status: Parish church
- Dedication: Peter of Verona

Architecture
- Functional status: Active
- Heritage designation: National Historical Landmark
- Designated: 1939
- Architectural type: Church building
- Style: Baroque
- Completed: 1717; 309 years ago

Administration
- Division: Vicariate of St. Peter Verona; Vicariate of Our Lady, Mirror of Justice
- Province: San Fernando
- Diocese: Balanga

Clergy
- Bishop: Rufino C. Sescon, Jr.
- Vicar: Epraim A. Gloria

Saint Peter of Verona Parish Church, commonly known as Hermosa Church, is a Catholic church located in Hermosa, Bataan, Philippines. The church is Hermosa's cultural treasure. It is under the jurisdiction of the Diocese of Balanga (Vicariates of Saint Peter Verona and Our Lady, Mirror of Justice).

== History ==
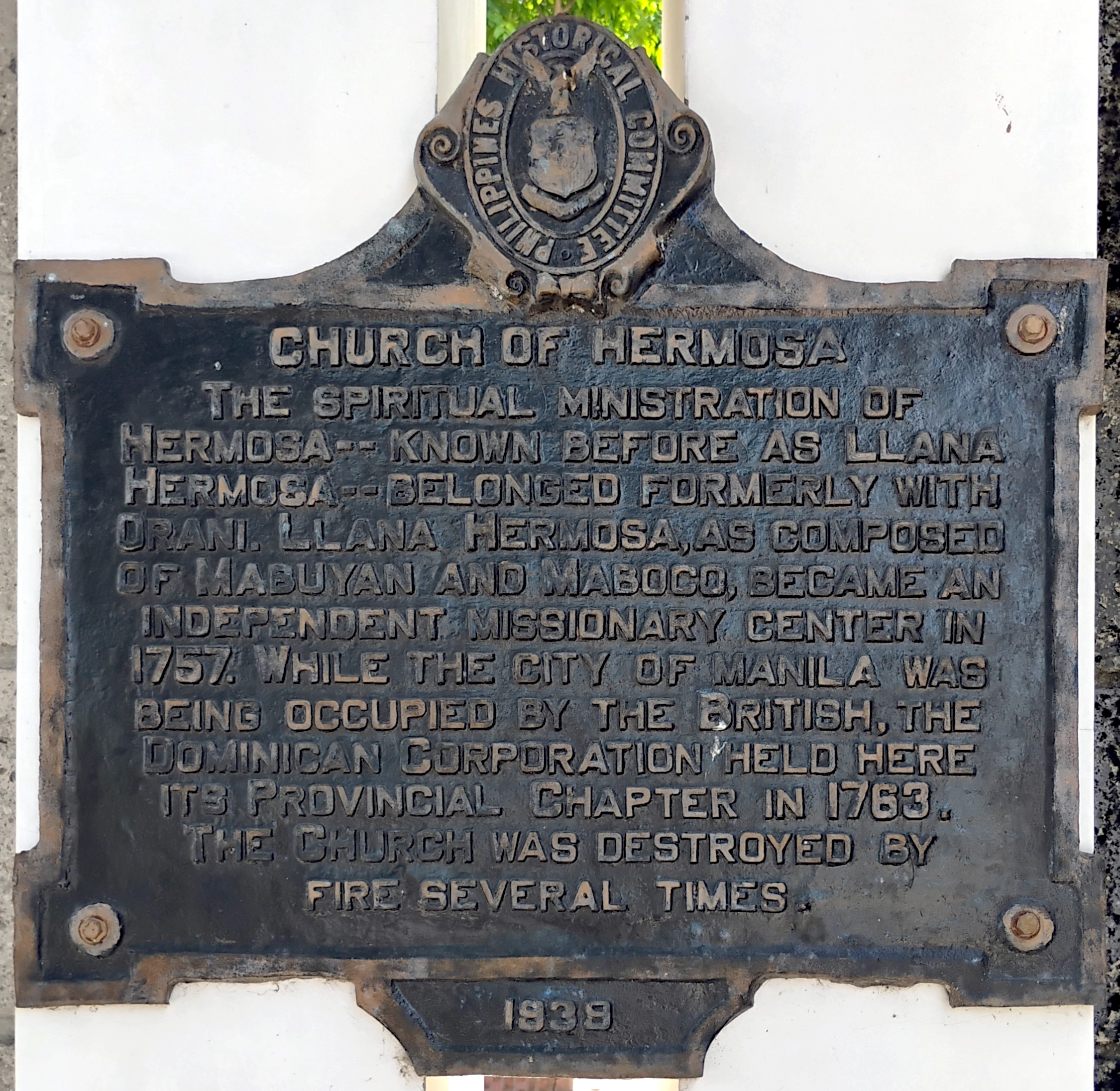
National historical marker installed in 1939

Hermosa, known as "Llana Hermosa" belonged formerly to Orani (composed of Mabuyan and Maboco). It became an independent missionary Pueblo in 1717. In the British invasion of Manila, the Dominicans held there its provincial chapters in 1763. The church was destroyed by fire several times. Residents of Hermosa found a boat with a statue of a saint inside it along the river.

Saint Peter of Verona, O.P. (1206 – April 6, 1252), also known as "Saint Peter Martyr", was a 13th-century Italian Catholic priest, Dominican friar and a celebrated preacher. He became the patron of this town.

Established in 1717, the church features a baroque-style façade, with a belfry on the topmost portion of the church. At the façade's center is stained-glass window depicting Saint Peter of Verona, a 13th-century Italian Catholic priest.

== Folklore ==
According to a local folklore, the people of Hermosa found a broken boat near Almacen River and inside the boat was an image that was identified to be Saint Peter of Verona with a large knife wedged on his head. The image was enshrined in Hermosa Church and Peter of Verona was then selected as the patron saint.

== Structure ==
The church features a baroque-style façade with stained-glasses windows. The major retablo of Hermosa is made more attractive by the variations of saints placed in it amid its dome. The church brings remembrance of the colonial past.

== Designation ==
The National Historical Commission of the Philippines declared the church a national historical landmark in 1939.

== Gallery ==
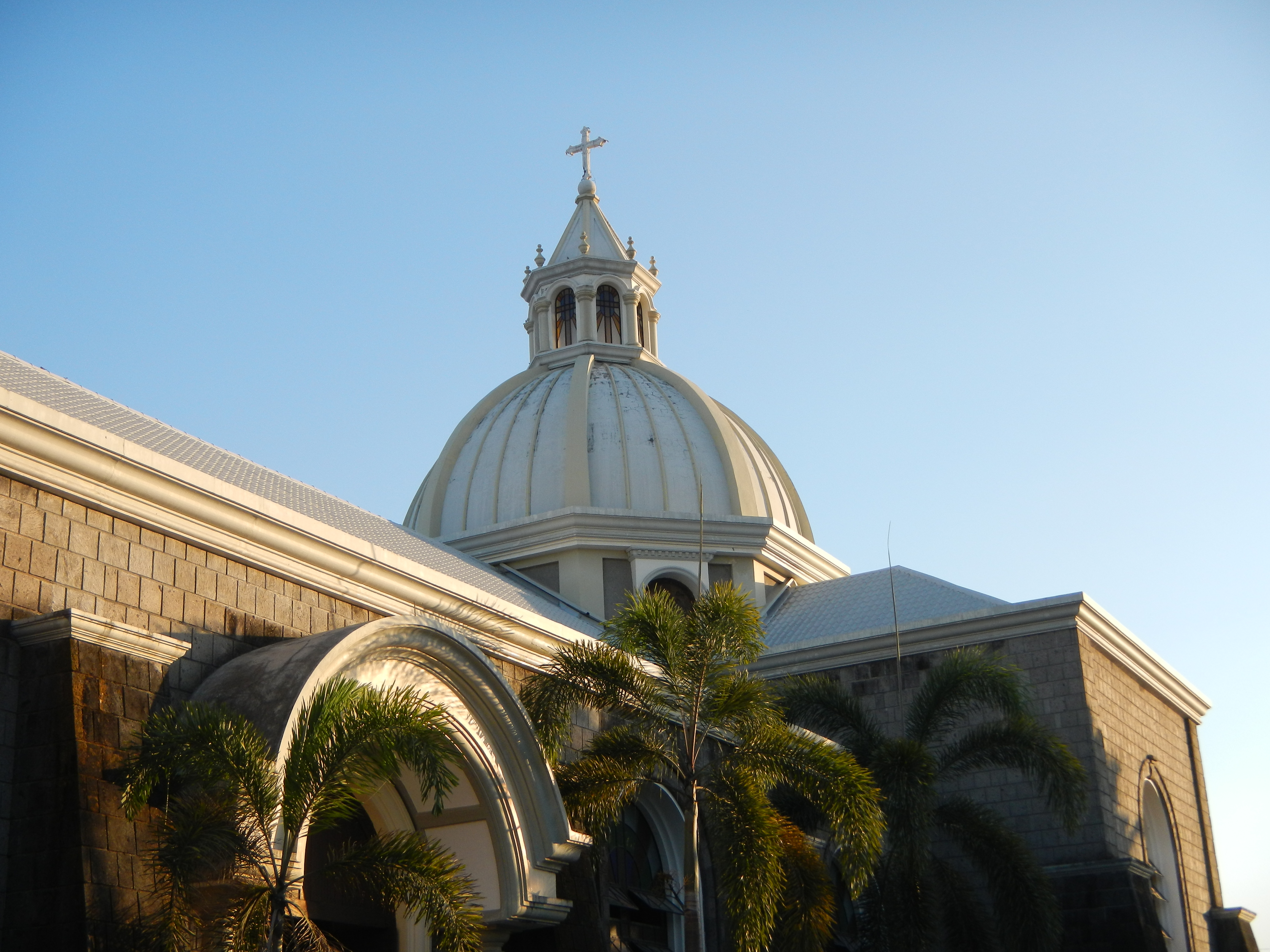
Dome

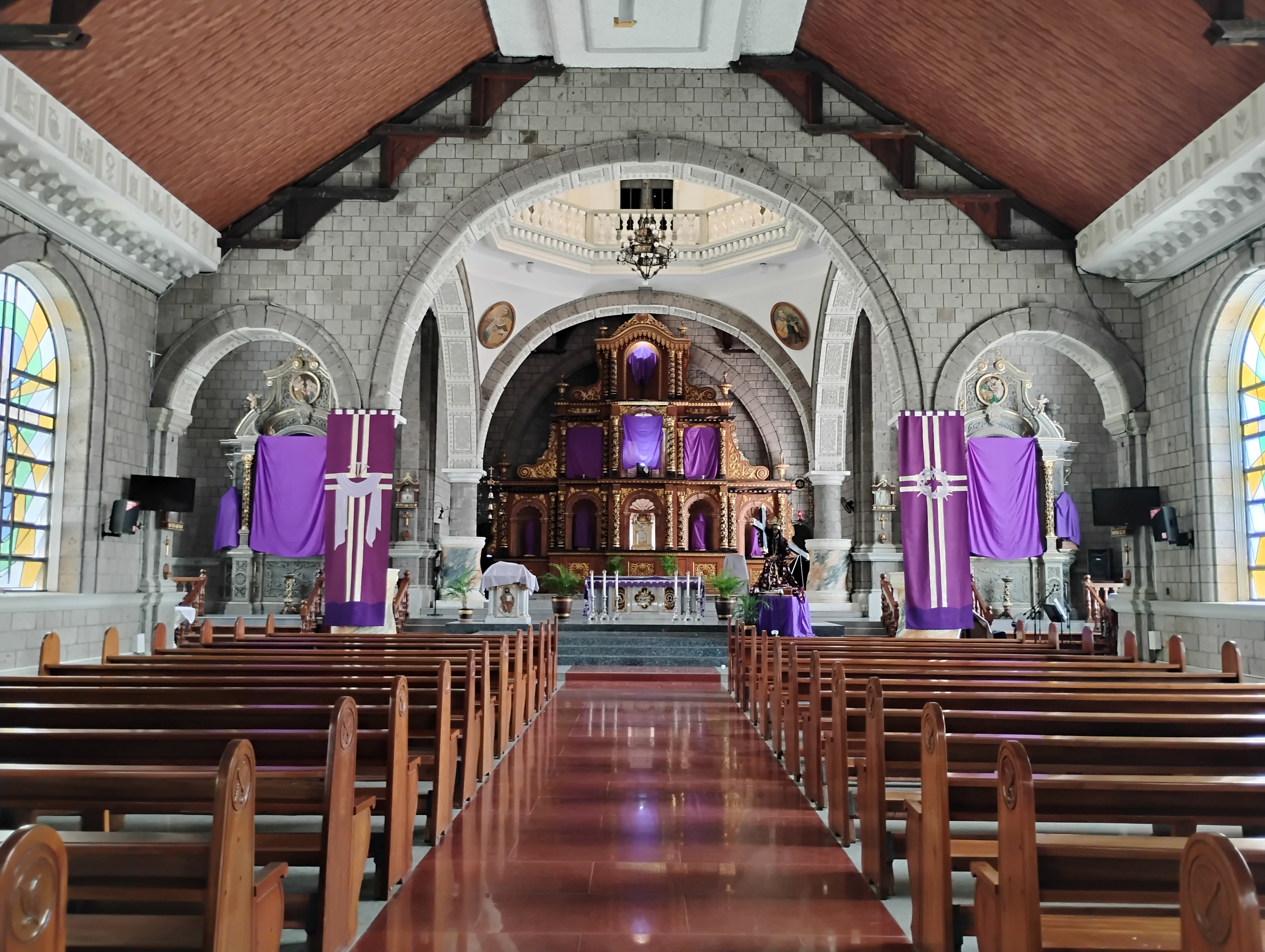
Church interior in 2025

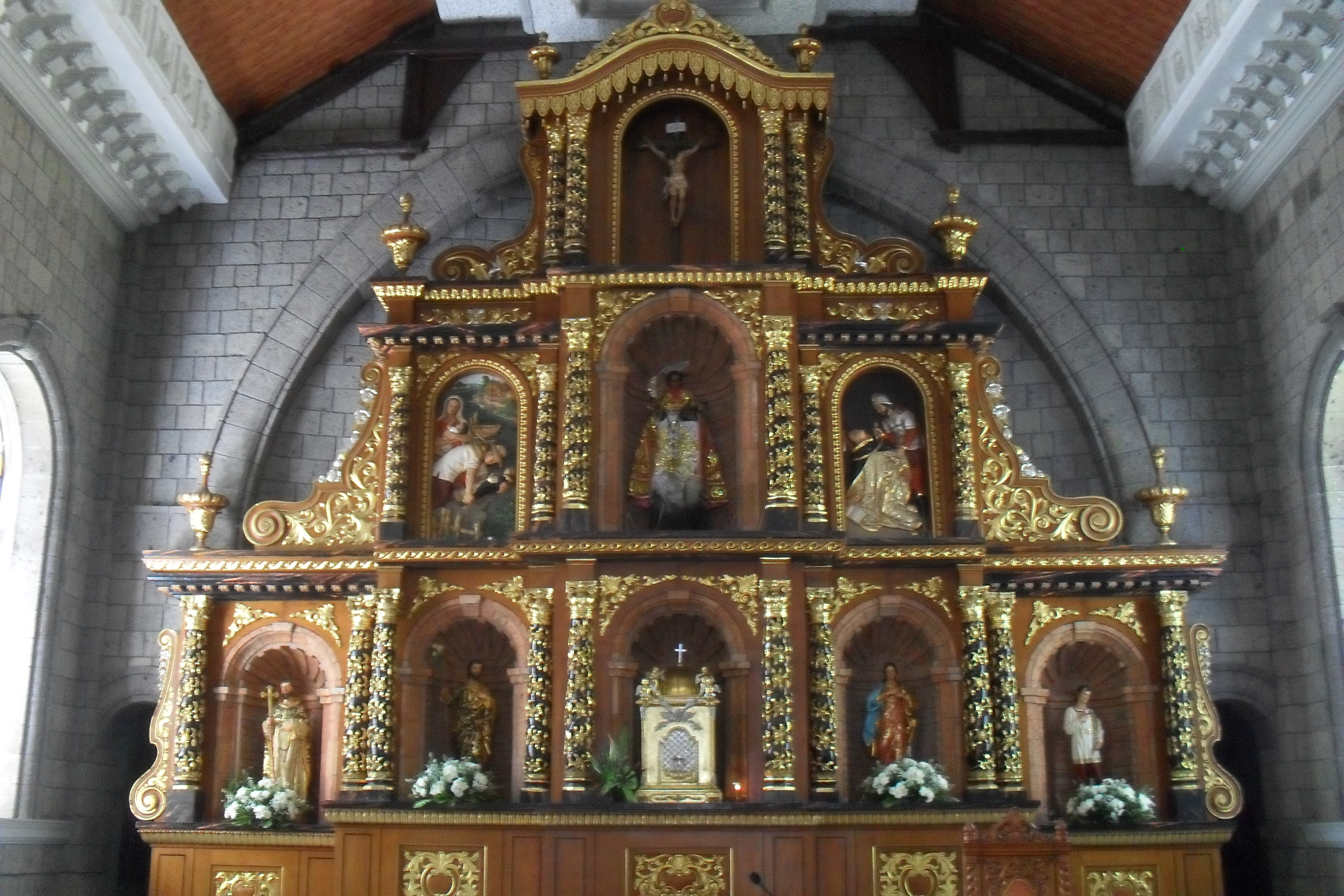
Altar
