= List of historical markers of the Philippines in Central Luzon =

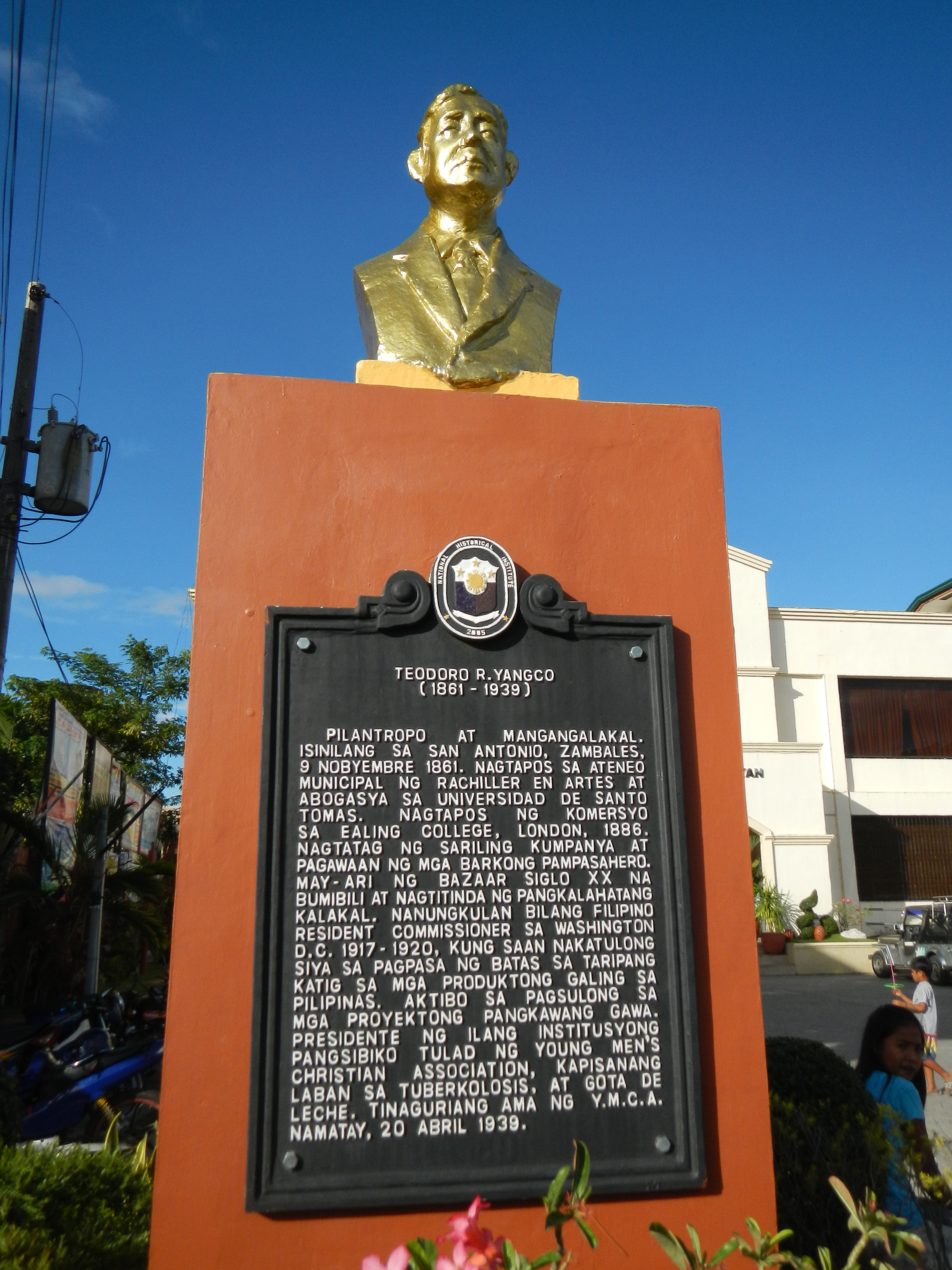
Monument and marker for Teodoro R. Yangco in San Antonio, Zambales

This list of historical markers installed by the National Historical Commission of the Philippines (NHCP) in Central Luzon (Region III) is an annotated list of people, places, or events in the region that have been commemorated by cast-iron plaques issued by the said commission. The plaques themselves are permanent signs installed in publicly visible locations on buildings, monuments, or in special locations.

While many Cultural Properties have historical markers installed, not all places marked with historical markers are designated into one of the particular categories of Cultural Properties.

A marker on the site of the assassination of Aurora Aragon Quezon in Bongabon was rededicated on the site on April 28, 2013, after the original marker dated February 13, 1991, went missing.

There has been an issue regarding the possible relocation of a historical marker dedicated to Francisco "Soc" Rodrigo in Bulakan over ownership issues of the heritage house.

The historical marker for José Rizal in Tarlac City was reported to be in a state of rot in 2011. The marker was relocated and put in a better position in front of the city plaza after 58 years of neglect.

On June 3, 2016, it was the first time for the NHCP to unveil a marker for a nameless personality. A marker was installed in Macabebe, commemorating the leader of the Battle of Bangkusay Channel, the "first native to give up his life for independence."

The first historical marker in the Kapampangan language was unveiled on August 17, 2017, for the Holy Rosary Parish Church of Angeles City. This also served as a rectification for the earlier marker of the Pamintuan Mansion saying that the said house was the site of the first anniversary celebration of the independence of the Philippines. In consonance, replacement markers were also installed for the said house.

This article lists 231 markers from the region of Central Luzon, including eight (8) that are part of the Philippine Nationhood Trail markers series.

== Aurora ==
This table lists seven markers from the province of Aurora.

Marker title	Description	Location	Language	Date issued	Image
Aurora Aragon Quezon (1888–1949)	First Lady of Manuel Quezon and became the first head of the Philippine Red Cross.	Aurora Aragon Quezon Ancestral House, Rizal St., Baler	Filipino	February 19, 1985	
Bayan ng Baler (Note: Town of Baler)	An old community of Barrio Sabang before the arrival of the Spaniards, established as a Franciscan mission in 1609.	Baler Plaza, Baler	Filipino	2009	
Birthplace of Manuel Luis Quezon	Site of the house where Manuel Quezon was born on August 19, 1878.	Museo Baler, Quezon St., Baler	English	1948	
Dikaloyungan	Site of declaration of defiance against the Spaniards in Aurora. Katipuneros tore their cedula here on September 3, 1897.	Recto St., Brgy. Zabali, Baler	Filipino	June 30, 2005	
Lt. Gilmore Rescue Party	Site of a rescue party of Lt. James C. Gilmore to rescue the Spanish garrison against Philippine revolutionaries.	Baler Plaza, San Luis St., Baler	English	1939	
Siege of the Church of Baler	The Spanish garrison was besieged in Baler Church from June 27, 1898, to June 2, 1899.	Baler Church, Baler	English	1939	
Simbahan ng Baler (Note: Church of Baler)	First built by Franciscans in 1611, site of the Siege of the Church of Baler.	Baler Church, Baler	English	April 12, 2000	

== Bataan ==
This table lists 23 markers from the province of Bataan.

Marker title	Description	Location	Language	Date issued	Image
Bataan and Democracy	Contains a quote from United States President Franklin D. Roosevelt's radio address of January 3, 1945.	Hermosa	English	January 5, 1945	
Cabcaben; Mariveles, Bataan	Resistance against the Japanese ended when Corregidor fell and when Lieutenant General Jonathan M. Wainwright surrendered to Lieutenant General Masaharu Homma in a house on this site.	Bataan Provincial Expressway/Roman Superhighway, Townsite, Mariveles	Filipino	March 26, 1977	
Cayetano S. Arellano (1847–1920)	Birthplace of the first Filipino chief justice of the Philippines. He was born here on March 2, 1847.	Orion	Filipino	April 1970	
Church of Abucay	Dominicans were entrusted here in 1588. One of the earliest printing presses in the Philippines was operated in Abucay, under Rev. Francisco Blancas San Jose, O.P. and Don Tomas Pinpin.	Abucay Church facade, Abucay	English	1939	
Church of Balanga	Formerly part of Abucay, it became an independent mission in 1739.	Balanga Church facade, Balanga	English	1940	
Church of Hermosa	Served as a temporary provincial chapter for the Dominicans	Hermosa	English	1939	
Church of Orani	Became an independent missionary center in 1714. The church was reconstructed in 1938.	Orani Church, Orani	English	1939	
Church of Orion	Formerly part of Abucay. Became independent in 1667. Town was birthplace of Cayetano Arellano.	Orion Church facade, Orion	English	1939	
Church of Samal	Dominicans were entrusted here in 1596. In 1898, the church was burned by the Katipuneros to drive out their enemies.	Samal Church facade, Samal	English	1939	
Corregidor	Became a stronghold for multiple political entities, including the Chinese in 1225, Spanish, Dutch, Allied forces and the Japanese.	A. Bonifacio St., cor. Monroe, Mariveles	English	1949	
Death March April 1942	The last frontline of the defense of the Bataan Peninsula against the Japanese	Bagac	English	1968	
The Death March of Filipino and American Prisoners of War from Mariveles and Bagac to Camp O' Donnell, Capas, Tarlac April 1942	More than 70,000 Filipino and American soldiers were tortured by the Japanese in this march after the Fall of Bataan.	Mariveles	Filipino, English	1967	
The Fall of Bataan; 9 April 1942	In memory of the Filipinos and Americans who fought in World War II	Balanga	English	April 9, 1952	
Francisco C. Baltazar (Balagtas) 1788–1862	Great Filipino poet, author of Florante at Laura. Became inspiration for heroes such as José Rizal and Apolinario Mabini.	Balagtas Monument, Brgy. Wawa, Orion	Filipino	March 27, 2015	
Kalookan ng Sisiman (Note: Lookout of Sisiman)	First main headquarters of the first squadron of the coast guard under Capt. Alberto Navarette.	Sisiman, Mariveles	English	April 10, 1982	
Mariveles	During the Spanish era, it became the important checking point of ships entering or leaving Manila Bay. Starting point of Death March, April 9, 1942.	Mariveles	English	1950	
Ang Pinagsimulan ng Death March (Note: The Starting Point of the Death March)	Starting point of the Death March in Mariveles, where more than 70,000 Filipino and American soldiers were forced to march.	Poblacion, Mariveles	Filipino	March 23, 2017	
Ang Pinagsimulan ng Death March (Note: The Starting Point of the Death March)	Starting point of the Death March in Mariveles, where more than 70,000 Filipino and American soldiers were forced to march.	Bagac	Filipino	September 22, 2017	
Pook ng Lazareto ng Mariveles (Note: Site of Lazaretto of Mariveles)	Lazaretto, or a maritime quarantine station, built in 1882 to contain the spread of cholera in Manila.	Mariveles Mental Wellness and General Hospital, Mariveles	Filipino	August 22, 2024	
The Provincial Government Building of Bataan	Formerly known as the Casa Real. Housed the provincial high school from 1903 to 1906.	Balanga	English	1939	
Tomas Guillermo T. del Rosario	Remembered for advocating the separation of church and state in the Philippines.	Balanga	Filipino	2007	
Tomas Pinpin		Limbagang Pinpin Museum, Abucay, Bataan	Filipino	2019	
Tomas Pinpin	One of the first recorded Filipino experts in book publishing.	Tomas Pinpin Monument, Plaza Mabatang, Abucay	Filipino	November 22, 2022	

== Bulacan ==
This table lists 68 markers from the province of Bulacan.

Marker title	Description	Location	Language	Date issued	Image
(untitled)	Site where the house stood housing the school of the Women of Malolos which was given a letter by Rizal.	Old site of Instituto Mujeres, Malolos City	Filipino	June 20, 1961	
(untitled)	Convent where Emilio Aguinaldo enacted the Malolos Constitution.	Barasoain Church Convent, Malolos City	Filipino	1969	
(untitled)	Barasoain as the Cradle of Democracy in the East. Members of the Malolos Congress.	Barasoain Church, Malolos City	Filipino, English, and Spanish	1961	
(untitled)	Barasoain Church site where Aguinaldo took his oath as the president of the Philippines.	Barasoain Church, Malolos City	Filipino	1969	
Alejo Santos; 1911–1984	Hero of the Second World War.	Bustos Heritage Park, Bustos	Filipino	July 17, 2022	
Asociacion Filantropica De Los Damas De La Cruz Roja En Filipinas (Note: Philanthropic Association of the Red Cross Ladies in the Philippines)	Established under Hilaria del Rosario, during the First Philippine Republic.	Bulacan Provincial Capitol, Malolos	Filipino	August 15, 2024	
Ang Bayan ng Kalumpit (Note: The Town of Calumpit)	Established in 1575 by Augustinians, became the first town in Bulacan.	Calumpit	Filipino	December 27, 1975	
Ang Bayan ng Obando (Note: The Town of Obando)	Former part of Meycauayan and Polo, famous for its festival every May 17–18.	Parking Area, Obando Municipal Hall, Obando	Filipino	May 19, 1973	
Birthplace of General Gregorio H. del Pilar	Katipunan general born in Cupang on November 14, 1875. Defended Kakarong and Tirad Pass.	Cupang, Bulakan	Filipino	1948	
Birthplace of Marcelo del Pilar	Birthplace of the propagandist and colleague of Rizal. He was a descendant of the old noble family of the Gatmaytans.	Cupang, Bulakan	English	1939	
Birthplace of Marcelo del Pilar	Birthplace of the propagandist, born on August 30, 1850. Writer and editor of La Solidaridad.	Cupang, Bulakan	English	2012	
Biyaknabato	Where Katipuneros under Aguinaldo established the Republic of Biak na Bato.	Biak-na-Bato National Park, San Miguel	Filipino	December 14, 1973	
Bulacan Military Area	Marker dedicated to the heroes of the Bulacan Military Area which was established on July 3, 1942.		Filipino		
Bulacan Military Area	Military camp aided in the battle of the Filipino guerrillas and USAFFE against the Japanese in WWII.	Bustos Plaza, Bustos	Filipino	August 2, 2012	
Bulakan Church	The town church of Bulakan built by Augustinians in 1578	Bulakan	Filipino	1956	
Casa Real	Built in 1580 as Casa Tribunal, became Casa Real of Bulacan Province in 1901.	Paseo del Congreso cor. Bank of Commerce Rd., Malolos City	Filipino	June 11, 1990	
Church of Barasoain	Site of Malolos Congress 1898, Inauguration of the First Philippine Republic 1899, Site of Universidad Literaria de Filipina	Barasoain Church façade, Malolos	Filipino, English	1940, 1969,	
Church of Hagonoy	Originally a chapel under Calumpit. Became a church in 1731.	Hagonoy	English	1958	
Church of Meycauayan	The town of Meycauayan was established by the Franciscans in 1578. Present church was built in 1668.	Meycauayan Church façade	English	1939	
Church of Pandi	The parish and town of Santa Maria, formerly known as Santa Maria de Pandi, were founded in 1792. Both town and church were destroyed during an incident between Filipino and American forces in April 1899.	Santa Maria Church façade	English	1939	
Dela Fuente-Villaroman Ancestral House		Caingin, San Rafael, Bulacan	English	August 17, 2022	
Dito ipinanganak noong ika-22 ng Marso, 1863 si Mariano Ponce (Note: Here Mariano Ponce was born March 22, 1863)	Colleague of Rizal in propagating Filipino ideas in Europe.	Mariano Ponce St., Brgy. Tibag, Baliwag	Filipino	1953	
Dr. Maximo Viola; 1857–1933	Rizal's travel companion in Europe who funded Noli me Tangere.	Maharlika Highway cor. Viola St., San Miguel	Filipino	October 17, 1962	
Emilio Aguinaldo y Famy (1869–1964)	First president of the Philippines. Malolos became the site of the revolutionary government after it was moved from Bakoor.	Calle Paseo del Congreso, Malolos	Filipino	January 23, 2012	
Felipe Buencamino, Ama (Note: Felipe Buencamino Sr.)	Statesman and first secretary of foreign affairs during the First Philippine Republic.	San Miguel	Filipino	February 24, 1974	
Felipe Salvador; 1870–1912	Advocate of religious freedom, became a leader of a Kapampangan revolt against the Spaniards.	Baliwag North Central School, Baliwag	Filipino	May 26, 2021	
Francisco Santiago (1889–1947); Ama ng Kundiman (Note: Francisco Santiago (1889–1947): Father of the Kundiman)	Wrote the first modern kundiman. Became the director of the Conservatory of Music of the University of the Philippines.	Sta. Maria	Filipino	1964	
Francisco "Soc" Rodrigo; 1914–1998	Teacher, broadcaster, writer, and senator who fervently used Filipino in his literary works and even in his teaching	Bulakan	Filipino	January 29, 2014	
Geminiano T. de Ocampo (1907–1987)	Ophthalmologist and educator, National Scientist.	Marcelo H. del Pilar National High School, Brgy. Bagong Bayan, Malolos	Filipino	December 12, 2007	
Guilermo E. Tolentino (1890–1976)	Birthplace of National Artist Guillermo E.Tolentino	Calle Sabitan, Malolos City	Filipino	July 28, 2012	
Heneral Isidoro D. Torres (Note: General Isidoro D. Torres)	Established a guerrilla unit when Malolos was captured by General Arthur MacArthur on March 31, 1899.	Brgy. Matimbo Rd., Matimbo, Malolos City	Filipino	September 15, 1956	
Joaquin Gonzalez (1853–1900)	Distinguished scientist in medicine and became representative of Pampanga for the revolutionary congress.	590 Dr. Gonzalez St., Poblacion, Baliuag	Filipino	September 21, 1982	
Jose C. Cojuangco (1896–1976)	Legislator and businessman. In 1938, established and headed the Philippine Bank of Commerce.	Cojuangco Ancestral House, Calle Paseo del Congreso, Malolos City	Filipino	2008	
Jose Corazon de Jesus (1894–1932); Hari ng Balagtasan (Note: Jose Corazon de Jesus (1894–1932): King of Balagtasan)	Famous poet. Known as the "King of Balagtasan" after beating Florentino T. Collantes at the Olympic Stadium.	Sta. Maria	Filipino	1964	
Kapitolyo ng Bulacan (Note: Capitol of Bulacan)	Current art deco building built under the designs of Juan Arellano, 1930.	Bulacan Capitol Grounds, Malolos City	Filipino	January 23, 2026	
Katedral ng Malolos (Note: Cathedral of Malolos)	Built in 1580 by Augustinian friars, became a cathedral in 1962 and a minor basilica in 1999.	Church of the Immaculate Conception site, Malolos City	Filipino	March 14, 2022	
Labanan sa Kakarong (Note: Battle of Kakarong)	Became a Katipunan camp of 6,000 soldiers. More than 1,200 Katipuneros died in this historic battle.	Pandi	Filipino	April 17, 1968	
Labanan sa Ipo Dam (Note: Battle of Ipo Dam)	Five-day battle between Japanese and allied forces. The battle was won by the guerrillas on May 17, 1945.	Norzagaray	Filipino	May 19, 2005	
Labanan sa Quingua (Plaridel); Abril 23, 1899 (Note: Battle of Quingua (Plaridel): April 23, 1899)	Major battle of the Philippine–American War. American forces were first defeated, but advanced through the help of reinforcements.	Plaridel	Filipino	April 23, 1999	
Labanan sa San Rafael (Note: Battle of San Rafael)	The battle on November 30, 1896, became one of the bloodiest in Bulacan, with Filipino forces headed by General Anacleto Enriquez and Spanish forces headed by Lieutenant Colonel Lopez Arteaga.	San Rafael Church façade, San Rafael	Filipino	November 30, 1997	
Mababang Paaralan ng San Rafael (Note: San Rafael Elementary School)	School building designed by William E. Parsons. Used by the Japanese during WWII from 1942 to 1944.	San Rafael Elementary School, S. Valero St., M. Valte St., San Rafael		2008	
Mabuhay ang mga Bayani (Note: Long Live the Heroes)	Place where a thousand men protested against the local Spanish government.	Bustos Church grounds, C.L. Hilario St., Bustos	Filipino	1960	
Malolos; Landas ng Pagkabansang Pilipino, 1898–1899 (Note: Malolos: Philippine Nationhood Trail, 1898–1899)		Malolos Cathedral, Malolos	Filipino	September 20, 2023	
Marcelo H. del Pilar	Where propagandist Marcelo H. del Pilar was born on August 30, 1850.	Bulakan (1939 marker currently within NHCP storage)	English	1939, 1976	
Marcelo H. del Pilar National High School	First provincial high school; established in 1903 by the Thomasites.	Marcelo H. del Pilar National High School, Brgy. Bagong Bayan, Malolos	Filipino	March 10, 2026	
Mariano Ponce; 1863–1918	Colleague of Rizal in propagating Filipino ideas in Europe.	Mariano Ponce St., Brgy. Tibag, Baliuag	Filipino	May 24, 2019	
Mariano V. Sevilla; 12 Nobyembre 1839 – 23 Nobyembre 1923 (Note: Mariano V. Sevilla: 12 November 1839 – 23 November 1923)	Priest and writer of devotional for Flores de Mayo, implicated in the Cavite mutiny.	Mariano Sevilla monument, Bulakan Church grounds, Bulakan	Filipino	November 23, 2023	
Memorare	A Muslim armada composed of 2,000 fought here and opposed the Spaniards at Bangkusay, Tondo.	Battle of Bangkusay Monument, Emilio G. Perez cor. Santo Niño-San Agustin Diversion Road, Hagonoy	Filipino	August 14, 2024	
Nicanor Abelardo at Sta. Ana (1893–1934) (Note: Nicanor Abelardo y Sta. Ana (1893–1934))	One of the greatest musical composers of the Philippines. Became known for Mutya ng Pasig.	San Miguel	Filipino	June 20, 1963	
Pook na Sinilangan ni Balagtas (Note: Birthplace of Francisco Balagtas)	Birthplace of the national poet Francisco Balagtas, born on April 2, 1788. Author of Florante at Laura.	Panginay, Balagtas (Bigaa)	Filipino	1949	
Pook ng Gobierno Militar de la Plaza; Malolos, Bulacan (Note: Site of the military governor's place: Malolos, Bulacan)	Office of General Isidoro Torres during the First Philippine Republic.	Calle Pariancillo, Brgy. Santo Niño, Malolos City	Filipino	2008	
Republica Filipina, 1898–1901 (Note: Philippine Republic, 1898–1901)		Malolos	Spanish	September 15, 1956	
Philippine Republic; 1898–1901	Church convent served as Presidential Residence of General Emilio Aguinaldo during the First Philippine Republic.	Church of the Immaculate Conception, Malolos City	Filipino, English, and Spanish	1969	
Simbahan ng Angat (Note: Church of Angat)	Parish was originally a visita of Quingua. First stone church built in 1773.	Angat	Filipino	May 4, 2026	
Simbahan ng Baliwag (Note: Church of Baliwag)	Established in the town by Augustinians 1733. The church became a military camp and hospital by the Americans in 1899.	Baliwag Church, Baliwag	Filipino	August 28, 2023	
Simbahan ng Barasoain (Note: Church of Barasoain)	Declared by the NHCP as a National Historical Landmark.	Barasoain Church façade, Malolos	Filipino	September 21, 1977	
Ang Simbahan ng Bulacan (Note: The Church of Bulacan)	Established by Augustinians in 1575 as a visita of Tondo. Where Gregorio Del Pilar secretly distributed leaflets from the writings of Marcelo Del Pilar.	Bulakan	Filipino	2007	
Simbahan ng Calumpit (Note: Church of Calumpit)	The Town Church of Calumpit built by Augustinians in 1571	Calumpit	Filipino	June 24, 2019	
Simbahan ng Hagonoy (Note: Church of Hagonoy)	Town established by Augustinian priests in 1581. Father Diego Ordoñez Vivar served as first priest.	Hagonoy	Filipino	April 5, 1981	
Simbahan ng Marilao (Note: Church of Marilao)	Started as a chapel, first built by Fr. Vicente de Talavera on April 21, 1796.	Marilao	Filipino	1980; May 8, 1996	
Simbahan ng Obando (Note: Church of Obando)	First built by Franciscans under the leadership of Rev. P. Manuel de Olivencia, on April 29, 1754.	Obando Church façade, Obando	Filipino	April 28, 1984	
Simbahan ng Pulilan (Note: Church of Pulilan)	Established by Augustinians. Besieged during the revolution.	Pulilan Church façade, Pulilan	Filipino	March 15, 2021	
Simbahan ng Quingua (Plaridel, Bulacan) (Note: Church of Quingua (Plaridel, Bulacan))	Established in the town by Augustinians 1602. The church became a military camp and hospital by the Americans in 1899.	Plaridel	Filipino	1959	
Simbahan ng San Jose del Monte (Note: Church of San Jose del Monte)	Parish established in 1752.	San Jose del Monte	Filipino	February 13, 2025	
Simbahan ng San Miguel de Mayumo (Note: Church of Saint Michael of Mayumo)	Established in 1607 as a visita of Candaba by Augustinians. Became a Spanish garrison during the Battle of San Miguel de Mayumo, May 1898.	San Miguel church façade, San Miguel	Filipino	May 3, 2018	
Simbahan ng Sta. Maria (Note: Church of Sta. Maria)		Santa Maria church façade, Santa Maria	Filipino		
Simon Tecson (1861–1903)	Revolutionary colonel from San Miguel, who headed the troops of Bulacan, and was assigned by Aguinaldo to pursue the Siege of Baler.	San Miguel	Filipino	2009	
Trinidad Tecson (1848–1928)	Revolutionary who became known as the "Mother of Biyak-na-Bato."	San Miguel	Filipino	November 18, 1979	

== Nueva Ecija ==
This table lists 25 markers from the province of Nueva Ecija.

Marker title	Description	Location	Language	Date issued	Image
Bahay ni Crispulo Sideco (Note: House of Crispulo Sideco)	Became the headquarters of Emilio Aguinaldo when the capital moved to San Isidro.	Crispulo Sideco House	Filipino	April 5, 2024	
Cabanatuan; Landas ng Pagkabansang Pilipino, 1899 (Note: Cabanatuan: Philippine Nationhood Trail, 1899)		Cabanatuan Cathedral	Filipino	June 14, 2024	
Central Luzon State University	Founded as Muñoz School in 1907. Secretly founded here a group of guerrillas in 1943.	Central Luzon State University, University Ave., Science City of Muñoz	Filipino	April 12, 2007	
Death Place of General Antonio Luna	Formerly the presidential headquarters of the First Philippine Republic, where Luna and his aide Francisco Roman were assassinated by Aguinaldo's men.	San Nicolas de Tolentino Church, Plaza Lucero, Cabanatuan	English	February 3, 1966	
Epifanio de los Santos	Prince of Filipino Scholars, noted author, historian, and lawyer.	Epifanio de los Santos Monument, San Isidro Plaza, San Isidro	Filipino	April 6, 2015	
Heneral Manuel Tinio (1877–1924) (Note: General Manuel Tinio (1877–1924))	Revolutionary general who fought on both the Philippine revolutionary wars against the Spanish and the Americans.	Tinio Mausoleum, Cabanatuan Cemetery, Cabanatuan City	Filipino	1977	
Jose P. Bantug	Teacher of public health. Founder and first president of Philippine Numismatic and Antiquarian society.	San Isidro	Filipino	May 14, 1983	
Katedral ng Cabanatuan (Note: Cathedral of Cabanatuan)	Established by Agutinians as visita of Gapan.	Cabanatuan Cathedral, Cabanatuan City	Filipino	June 14, 2024	
Kuyapo, Nueva Ecija; Disyembre 10, 1899 (Note: Cuyapo, Nueva Ecija: December 10, 1899)	House where Apolinario Mabini was staying when he was captured by the Americans.	Cuyapo	Filipino	1964	
Labanan sa San Isidro (Note: Battle of San Isidro)	Troops headed by Mariano Llanera and Pantaleon Valmonte to capture the then capital of Nueva Ecija on September 2, 1896.	San Isidro Plaza, San Isidro	Filipino	1995	
Lazaro Francisco	Distinguished novelist in the Filipino language who grew up in Cabanatuan.	Lazaro Francisco Elementary School (West Cabanatuan Elementary School), Zulueta Road, Cabanatuan	Filipino	June 16, 1990	
Lungsod ng Kabanatuan (Note: City of Cabanatuan)	Town originally part of Gapan. Became town on July 14, 1777. Became the capital of the Philippines on May 9, 1899, until it was moved to Tarlac.	Cabanatuan	Filipino	July 14, 1966	
Mamerto Natividad (1871–1897)	Revolutionary lieutenant general of Central Luzon and spouse of Delfina Herbosa.	Cabiao	Filipino	2007, replaced 2017	
Mariano Llanera (1855–1942)	Leader of the revolutionary forces in Nueva Ecija, was exiled to Guam by American forces in 1901.	Cabiao	Filipino	2007	
Memorare	Commemorating the Raid at Cabanatuan against Japanese forces during World War II.	Cabanatuan American Memorial, Pangatian, Cabanatuan	Filipino, English	2003	
Nueva Ecija High School	First opened in San Isidro in 1902. Tomás Mapúa spearheaded the new school in 1921. Antonio Toledo added two wings in the thirties.	Nueva Ecija High School, Cabanatuan	Filipino	September 8, 2022.	
Ang Pagkakatatag ng Hukbalahap (Note: The founding of the Hukbalahap)	Peasant revolt movement founded in 1942 that was fought against Japanese forces during World War II.	Bagong Sikat Elementary School, Bagong Sikat, Cabiao	Filipino	March 29, 2017	
Paliparang Maniquis, P.A.A.C. (Note: Maniquis Airfield, P.A.A.C.)	Where the Philippine Army Air Corps (PAAC) Advance School of Flying was relocated in 1941.	Camp Tinio National High School, Brgy. Camp Tinio, Cabanatuan	Filipino	May 1, 1968	
Pantabangan Dam	Built as a dam for Pampanga River for electricity and irrigation.	Pantabangan	Filipino	September 10, 1974	
Penyaranda	Became a separate municipality, 1851. Formerly part of Gapáng as Masipong.	Peñaranda	Filipino	1940	
Pook Na Kinamatayan ni Doña Aurora Aragon Quezon (Note: Death place of Aurora Aragon Quezon)	Assassination site of Doña Aurora Aragon Quezon, Manuel Quezon's first lady, among others.	Bongabon	Filipino	February 13, 1991; April 28, 2013 [rededicated after original plaque was found missing]	
Rancho Caridad (Note: Caridad Ranch)	Remnant of Hacienda Esperanza. Site of Gallego Institute of Agriculture and Industry.	Nampicuan	Filipino, English	June 15, 2013	
San Isidro	Became capital of Nueva Ecija from 1852 to 1912 and capital of the Philippines on March 29, 1899, by Emilio Aguinaldo.	San Isidro Municipal Hall, San Isidro	Filipino	1970	
San Isidro; Landas ng Pagkabansang Pilipino, 1899 (Note: San Isidro: Philippine Nationhood Trail, 1899)		Crispulo Sideco House	Filipino	April 5, 2024	
Simbahan ng Penyaranda (Note: Church of Peñaranda)	Built in 1869 under Father Florentino Samonte, continued by Father Isidoro Prada.	Peñaranda	Filipino,; English	1951	

== Pampanga ==
This table lists 80 markers from the province of Pampanga.

Marker title	Description	Location	Language	Date issued	Image
Angeles; Landas ng Pagkabansang Pilipino, 1899 (Note: Angeles: Philippine Nationhood Trail, 1899)	Aguinaldo temporarily stayed at the Pamintuan Mansion, June 5, 1898.	Pamintuan Mansion	Filipino	February 6, 2025	
Arayat; Landas ng Pagkabansang Pilipino, 1899 (Note: Arayat: Philippine Nationhood Trail, 1899)	Stopover of the Central Government of the First Philippine Republic on the way to San Isidro, Nueva Ecija.	Arayat Municipal Plaza, Jose Abad Santos Ave., Arayat	Filipino	April 11, 2024	
Artillery Memorial	Housed the Philippine Army Artillery Training Center. Formerly Camp Dau, became Camp del Pilar.	Dau, Mabalacat City	Filipino	March 10, 1996	
Artillery Memorial	Housed the Philippine Army Artillery Training Center. Formerly Camp Dau, became Camp del Pilar.	Mabalacat City	Filipino	May 11, 2017	
Augusto P. Hizon House	Declared as a heritage house by the NHCP.	Augusto Hizon Ancestral House, Consunji St., San Fernando City	English	2010	
Aurelio V. Tolentino	Playwright and novelist. Writer in Spanish, Tagalog, and Pampango.	Guagua	Filipino	October 13, 1987	
Aurelio Tolentino	Revolutionary, playwright, novelist, and poet. One of those who signed the Declaration of Philippine Independence.	Tolentino Monument, Municipal Plaza, Sen. Gil Puyat Ave., Guagua	Filipino	October 13, 2017	
Bacolor (1576–1976)	Founded by Augustine friars in 1576 under the patronage of William the Hermit. Headquarters of Simon de Anda during the British invasion.	Bacolor	Filipino	February 10, 1976	
Ang Bahay na Sinilangan ni Pangulong Diosdado Macapagal (Note: House where President Diosdado Macapagal was born)	This simple house is where the fifth president of the Philippines was born.	President Diosdado P. Macapagal Library and Museum, Lubao Old National Road, Barrio San Nicolas, Lubao	Filipino	1952; February 20, 1990	
Bahay ni Angel Pantaleon de Miranda (Note: House of Angel Pantaleon de Miranda)	Became a place of refuge for Aguinaldo's forces during the Filipino-American War	290 Calle Sto. Rosario, Angeles City	Filipino	December 7, 1986	
Barasoain Church Replica		Expo Filipino, Clark, Mabalacat City			
Benigno S. Aquino Jr. "Ninoy" (1923–1983)	Tarlac governor who became senator. A political opponent of Ferdinand Marcos.	Pampanga Provincial Capitol grounds, San Fernando City	Filipino	2009	
Bienvenido M. Gonzalez (1893–1953)	Distinguished scientist and the sixth president of the University of the Philippines.	Apalit	Filipino	December 30, 1982	
Church of Apalit	The church dates back to 1590. Former church of brick destroyed by the earthquake of 1863.	Apalit Church façade, Apalit	English	1939	
Church of Lubao	Architect Fr. Antonio Herrera, Augustinian, constructed this church, 1614–1630.	Lubao Church façade, Lubao	English	1952	
Church of Magalang	Established by the Augustinians in 1605. Occupied by the Japanese on January 3, 1942.	Magalang	English		
Clark Field (Fort Stotsenburg)	Formerly a pati or Aeta community.Historical military camp established by the Americans.	Clark Field, Angeles	Filipino	September 1, 2003	
Dayrit House	Declared as a heritage house by the NHCP.	Dayrit-Cuyugan Ancestral House, MacArthur Highway, San Fernando City	English	January 8, 2004	
Death March; April 1942	One of the ghastliest forced marches in history. Site of the railroad station where Filipino and American forces were inhumanely loaded.	San Fernando Railroad Station, San Fernando City.	Filipino and English	1956	
Death Place of Roxas	Manuel Roxas, first president of the Republic of the Philippines, died here on April 15, 1948.	Clark Field, Angeles City	English	1955	
Diosdado Macapagal (1910–1997)	Ninth president of the Philippines, native of Lubao, Pampanga. Shifted independence date from July 4 to June 12.	Pampanga Provincial Capitol, San Fernando City	Filipino	2009	
Diosdado P. Macapagal (1910–1997)	Ninth president of the Philippines. Known as the "poor boy from Lubao."	Arayat Central Elementary School, Arayat, Pampanga	English	2001	
Diosdado P. Macapagal (1910–1997)	Ninth president of the Philippines. Known as the "poor boy from Lubao."	Bahay Pare Elementary School, Candaba, Pampanga	English	2001	
Diosdado P. Macapagal (1910–1997)	Ninth president of the Philippines. Known as the "poor boy from Lubao."	Basa Air Base Central Elementary School, Floridablanca, Pampanga	English	2001	
Diosdado P. Macapagal	Ninth president of the Philippines. Was helped by the philanthropist Honorio Ventura.	President Diosdado P. Macapagal Library and Museum, Lubao Old National Road, Barrio San Nicolas, Lubao	English	1990	
Diosdado P. Macapagal	Ninth president of the Philippines. Known as the "poor boy from Lubao."	Macapagal Monument, Lubao Central Elementary School, Purok 1–2 San Nicolas 1st Rd., Barrio San Nicolas, Lubao	English	2001	
Don Honorio Ventura Technological State University	First established as Colegio de Instruccion Primaria y Latinidad by Father Juan Zita and Felino Gil on November 4, 1861.	Pampanga State University, MacArthur Highway, Bacolor	Filipino	2014	
Emilio Aguilar Cruz (1915–1991)	Writer, editor, statesman, diplomat, and artist. Born on June 5, 1915.	Emilio Aguilar Cruz (EAC) Museum, Abe's Farm, Magalang (original location: Magalang Town Plaza, Magalang)	Filipino	August 7, 1992; reunveiled on November 12, 2015	
Felipe Sonsong (1611–1686)	Became part of Maniago revolt and was exiled to the Marianas until his death.	Macabebe church façade, Macabebe (original location: Macabebe church plaza)	Filipino	May 1, 2011	
Felix Galura; 1866–1919	Revolutionary and great Kapampangan writer. Headed the siege of Bacolor, to free the province from the Spaniards.	Felix Galura Monument, Don Honorio Ventura St., Bacolor	Filipino	October 5, 2017	
Guagua National Colleges	First established on June 18, 1918, by Father Nicanor Banzali within the old convent of Guagua Church.	Guagua National Colleges, Sta. Filomena Rd., Guagua	Filipino	February 24, 1993	
Henson–Hizon House	Declared as a heritage house by the NHCP.	Henson-Hizon Ancestral House, V. Tiomico St., San Fernando City	English	October 25, 2003	
Hizon–Singian House	Declared as a heritage house by the NHCP.	Hizon-Singian Ancestral House, Consunji St., San Fernando City	English	2003	
Honorio Ventura (1887–1940)	Philanthropist and public servant, who became governor of Palawan from 1914 to 1921.	Pampanga Capitol Grounds, San Fernando City	Filipino	2009	
Joaquin Gonzalez	Became representative of Pampanga for the revolutionary congress.	Apalit	Filipino	July 1982	
José Abad Santos (1886–1942)	Statesman who was martyred during World War II as he declined allegiance to the Japanese forces.	San Fernando City	English		
José Abad Santos (1886–1942)	Statesman who was martyred during World War II as he declined allegiance to the Japanese forces.	José Abad Santos Monument, Gov. Macario Arnedo Park, Provincial Capitol Grounds, San Fernando City	Filipino	2009	
José Abad Santos (1886–1942)	Statesman who was martyred during World War II as he declined allegiance to the Japanese forces.	Heroes Hall, Lazatin Blvd., San Fernando City (currently within NHCP storage)	Filipino	2004	
José Abad Santos; 1886–1942	Statesman who was martyred during World War II as he declined allegiance to the Japanese forces.	Heroes Hall, Lazatin Blvd., San Fernando City	Filipino	2017	
Jose Alejandrino; 1870–1951	Revolutionary who served as minister of agriculture and industry and then as senator.	Arayat Municipal Plaza, Jose Abad Santos Ave., Arayat	Filipino	December 1, 2025	
Jose B. Lingad; 1914–1980	Guerilla leader during WWII, assassinated during the Marcos dictatorship.	Jose B. Lingad Park and Museum, Lubao	Filipino	November 24, 2021	
Juan Crisostomo Soto (Crissot) (1867–1918)	Distinguished Pampango poet, dramatist, and newspaperman. Translated into Kapampangan Noli me Tangere and El Filibusterismo. Joined the Philippine Revolution and the Filipino-American War.	Soto Monument, MacArthur Highway, Bacolor	English	1961, 2012	
Himpilang Daang-bakal ng San Fernando (Note: San Fernando Railway Station)	Built in 1892 as part of the Manila-Dagupan railroad line. Site where Filipino and American forces were loaded after the death march.	San Fernando Railroad Station, San Fernando City	Filipino	April 9, 2004	
Ang Kabataang Pinuno ng Macabebe (Note: The Young Leader of Macabebe)	In honor of the Brave Youth of Macabebe, who died in the Battle of Bangkusay Channel on June 3, 1571.	Tarik Monument, Macabebe Municipal Building, Macabebe	Filipino	June 3, 2016	
Katedral ng San Fernando (Note: Cathedral of San Fernando)	First established by the Augustinians in 1755.	San Fernando Cathedral, San Fernando City	Filipino	August 15, 2023	
Labanan sa Macabebe (Note: Battle of Macabebe)	Gen. Isidoro Torres attacked the Spaniards on June 25, 1898. The artillery was seized three days after.	Macabebe	Filipino	June 25, 2013	
Luis Taruc	Patriot and defender of the rights of farmers and workers, founder of Hukbalahap	Luis Taruc Freedom Park, San Luis	Filipino	June 21, 2017	
Lalawigan ng Pampanga (Note: Province of Pampanga)	Explored by Augustinian priests in 1571. Became a very progressive province during the Spanish regime.	Pampanga Provincial Capitol, San Fernando City	Filipino	December 11, 1982	
Lazatin House	Declared as a heritage house by the NHCP.	Lazatin Ancestral House, Consunji St., San Fernando City	English	October 25, 2003	
Magalang	Town established in 1605. Site of the 1660 battle between the forces of Andres Malong under the command of Melchore De Vera and Spanish troops.	Magalang Public Plaza, Magalang	English	1954	
Mansyong Pamintuan (Note: Pamintuan Mansion)	In June 1899, became temporary headquarters of Emilio Aguinaldo while Tarlac was being set up as the capital of the republic.	Pamintuan Ancestral House, Miranda St., cor Sto. Entiero St., Angeles City	Filipino	August 17, 2017	
The Pamintuan Mansion	Became the headquarters of the revolutionary army and Emilio Aguinaldo.	Pamintuan Ancestral House, Miranda St., Angeles City	Filipino, English	2002 (replaced by the 2017 marker)	
Matandang Tahanan ng mga Lacson (Note: Lacson Ancestral House)	Built in 1923. A house characterized by genuine Kapampangan artistic expression and skill.	Magalang	Filipino	June 21, 1995	
Maximino H. Hizon (1870–1901)	General of the Philippine Revolution and the Filipino-American War. Exiled by the Americans to Guam.	Pampanga Provincial Capitol, San Fernando City	Filipino	September 1, 2001	
Monico R. Mercado	Co-sponsored the bill instituting the first irrigation systems in the Philippines.	Sasmuan	English	1966	
Nicolasa Dayrit-Panilio	Joined the revolutionary forces and helped the sickly and wounded during the Filipino-American War.	Henson-Hizon House, V. Tiomico St., San Fernando	Filipino	September 10, 2006	
Obispo Cesar Ma. Guerrero (Note: Bishop Cesar Ma. Guerrero)	First bishop of the dioceses of Lingayen and San Fernando	Mother of Good Counsel Minor Seminary, San Fernando	Filipino	September 8, 2025	
Paciano Dizon y Santos	Hailed by the US president as the first Filipino deputy insular auditor.	Porac	Filipino	June 30, 1982	
Pampanga High School	Opened in 1908 in what is now Pampanga Hotel. Where Diosdado Macapagal finished secondary schooling in 1929.	Pampanga High School, High School, Blvd., San Fernando (currently within NHCP storage)	Filipino	2010	
Pampanga High School	Established in San Fernando in 1902. First batch of students finished in 1912.	Pampanga High School, High School, Blvd., San Fernando	Filipino	August 14, 2018	
Pampanga Provincial Jail	Designed by William E. Parsons in 1909. An example of provincial architecture during the American occupation.	Pampanga Provincial Jail, Sta. Lucia Sto. Niño Viejo Rd., Capitol grounds, San Fernando	Filipino	2009	
Pampanga School of Arts and Trades (Formerly Escuale de Artes y Oficios de Bacolor)	Founded in 1861. Became the capitol site of Pampanga from 1901 to 1904.	Don Honorio Ventura Technological State University, MacArthur Highway, Bacolor	English	1962 (buried by Lahar)	
Pedro Abad Santos; 1876–1945	Founded the Socialist Party of the Philippines in 1932 and became the vice president of the 1930 Communist Party of the Philippines from 1938 to 1942.	Heroes Hall, Lazatin Blvd., San Fernando City	Filipino	2010	
Pisamban Maragul (Pisamban ning Angeles) (Note: The Large Church (Church of Angeles))	Formerly a visita of San Fernando, the first chapel was built in 1812.	Angeles City	Kapampangan, Filipino	August 17, 2017	
Remedios Gomez Paraiso	Guerrilla leader during World War II and defender of women's rights, commanded the 13-V Squadron of the HUKBALAHAP who became known as Kumander Liwayway.	Gomez Legacy Park, Anao, Mexico, Pampanga	Filipino	July 12, 2024	
Renato D. Tayag	Author, lawyer, soldier, and sportsman. Fought in Bataan and was part of the death march.	Angeles Library and Information Center, Sto. Entiero St., Angeles City	Filipino	October 9, 1986	
Rufino J. Cardinal Santos (1908–1973)	First Filipino cardinal. Founded Caritas Manila in 1953. Headed the reconstruction of Manila Cathedral from 1956 to 1958.	Rufino Cardinal Santos Catholic Center, Guagua	Filipino	2008	
Sa Alaala ng mga Nasawi sa Pagsunog sa Macabebe (Note: To the Memory of the Victims of the Burning of Macabebe)	Residents of Macabebe were burned alive inside the church by Katipuneros to halt the advance of American troops.	Macabebe church façade, Macabebe	Filipino	April 27, 2024	
Santa Iglesia	Religious fraternity established in Apalit that launched armed revolts against Spanish and American colonizers, reestablished by Felipe Salvador.	San Fernando City Hall, San Fernando City Pampanga	Filipino	December 10, 2023	
San Fernando; Landas ng Pagkabansang Pilipino, 1899 (Note: San Fernando: Philippine Nationhood Trail, 1899)	Where the Revolutionary government stayed en route from Malolos to San Isidro.	Gen. Hizon Extension	Filipino	April 1, 2024	
Ang Simbahan ng Santa Ana (Note: The Church of Santa Ana)	Established by the Augustinians as a visita of Arayat on December 19, 1598. Became a garrison and torture place during World War II	Santa Ana Church façade, Santa Ana	Filipino	October 22, 2013	
Simbahan ng Guagua (Note: Church of Guagua)	Church established by Augustinian priests in 1590. Stone church was built in 1661 under Father Jose Duque.	Guagua Church façade, Guagua	Filipino	October 13, 1982	
Simbahan ng Macabebe (Note: Church of Macabebe)	Established by Augustinian priests in 1575, same year as the townhood. Became the headquarters of Comandancia General del Centro y Norte of the Spanish troops on June 16, 1898.	Macabebe	Filipino	September 10, 2018	
St. Scholastica's Academy	Founded as the Assumption Academy in 1925 by the Missionary Benedictine Sisters of Tutzing.	MacArthur Highway, Brgy. Quebiauan, San Fernando	Filipino	November 20, 2025	
Tiburcio Hilario (1853–1903)	Appointed by Emilio Aguinaldo as governor of Pampanga, June 1898 and as the representative of Iloilo to the Malolos Congress, September 15, 1898.	Heroes Hall, Lazatin Blvd., San Fernando City	Filipino	2009	
Unang Pamahalaang Sibil (Note: First Civil Government)	Where the Commission of the Philippines under William Howard Taft established the first civil government in Pampanga, now celebrated as "Pampanga Day" on its anniversary on February 13.	Bacolor	Filipino	February 13, 1978	
Vicente S. Manansala (1910–1981)	Distinguished painter and muralist. Awarded as a national artist posthumously.	Macabebe Town Hall, Macabebe	Filipino	August 22, 1985	
Vicente S. Manansala (1910–1981)	Famous painter and muralist. Awarded as a National Artist in 1981.	Holy Angel University, Angeles City (original location: Manansala House, Binangonan, Rizal) (currently within NHCP storage)	Filipino	January 22, 1984	
Vivencio B. Cuyugan Sr.	First socialist mayor of the Philippines. One of the founders of Hukbalahap.	Cuyugan Ancestral House, Vivencio Cuyugan Rd., Brgy. del Pilar, San Fernando, Pampanga	Filipino	March 14, 2017	
Zoilo J. Hilario y Sangalang (1892–1963)	Poet and jurist. Poet laureate in the Spanish and Kapampangan languages.	Pampanga Provincial Capitol, San Fernando City	Filipino	June 27, 1982	

== Tarlac ==
This table lists 19 markers from the province of Tarlac.

Marker title	Description	Location	Language	Date issued	Image
Ang Bahay ni Makabulos (Note: The House of Makabulos)	Where General Francisco Makabulos lived after serving in the Philippine Revolution and the Filipino-American War.	La Paz	Filipino	January 23, 1972	
Bamban; Landas ng Pagkabansang Pilipino, 1899 (Note: Bamban: Philippine Nationhood Trail, 1899)	Bamban became temporary capital of the Philippines on June 6, 1899.	Bamban Municipal Library, Bamban	Filipino	July 4, 2024	
Capas Concentration Camp	In this camp, 40,000 Filipino soldiers and 9,000 American soldiers were imprisoned who experienced the Death March.	Barangay O’Donnell, Capas	Filipino	2002	
Carlos P. Romulo (1899–1985)	Famous diplomat, educator, writer, and journalist. First Asian president of the United Nations General Assembly in 1949.	Camiling Town Plaza, Camiling	Filipino	September 25, 1987	
Concepcion Presidencia Building	Built under the designs of Juan Arellano, 1929.	Concepcion Municipal Hall, Concepcion	Filipino	April 30, 2025	
Corazon C. Aquino (1933–2009)	Eleventh and first woman president of the Philippines. Spouse of Benigno "Ninoy" Aquino.	Corazon C. Aquino Monument, Tarlac City	Filipino	2010	
Death March; April 1942	Railroad station where WWII prisoners of war were brought by the Japanese.	Capas	Filipino and English	1967	
Francisco Makabulos (1871–1922)	Revolutionary general and writer. In 1895, established the Katipunan forces in Tarlac.	Tarlac Provincial Capitol, Tarlac City	Filipino	2004	
Francisco Makabulos (1871–1922)	Katipunero leader of the Cry of Tarlac, January 4, 1987.	Makabulos Statue, La Paz Plaza, La Paz	Filipino	September 17, 2021	
Jorge C. Bocobo	Second president of the University of the Philippines. Translated Noli Me Tángere and El Filibusterismo into English.	Gerona	Filipino	October 18, 1983	
Jose Rizal; 1861–1896; Tarlak, Tarlak	Where Rizal stayed in Tarlac. The house was owned by Captain Evaristo Puno.	J.P. Rizal St., cor. Espinosa St., Tarlac City; original location: J.P. Rizal St., Tarlac City	Filipino	July 2, 1960 (original); relocated November 7, 2019	
Kabisera ng Republika ng Pilipinas; Tarlac, Tarlac (Note: Capital of the Republic of the Philippines: Tarlac, Tarlac)	Became the office of the president during the Filipino-American War.	College of Computer Studies Building, Tarlac State University, Tarlac City	Filipino	July 14, 2014	
Kapitolyo ng Tarlac (Note: Capitol of Tarlac)	Designed by William E. Parsons and built in 1909.	Tarlac Provincial Capitol	Filipino	July 4, 2024	
Katedral ng Tarlac (Note: Cathedral of Tarlac)	Established as a visita of Magalang, 1686.	Tarlac Cathedral façade	Filipino	July 14, 2022	
Memorare	Dedicated to Filipino and American soldiers who suffered under the Death March.	Capas	Filipino	April 7, 2000	
Servillano Aquino (1874–1959)	Fought with Gen. Francisco Macabulos in liberating Tarlac from the Spaniards. Fought against the Americans in Caloocan, Pampanga, and Tarlac.	Concepcion	Filipino	February 7, 2021	
Ang Tahanan ng Pamilyang Aquino (Note: The Home of the Aquino Family)	Three generations of the Aquinos lived here, including Benigno Aquino and Ninoy Aquino.	Concepcion	Filipino	2011	
Tarlac	Province established in 1686, one of the first eight provinces which revolted against Spain.	Tarlac State University Flagpole, Romulo Boulevard cor. P. Zamora Avenue, Tarlac City	Filipino	July 21, 1975	
Tarlac; Landas ng Pagkabansang Pilipino, 1899 (Note: Tarlac: Philippine Nationhood Trail, 1899)	Casa Real in Tarlac City became seat of First Philippine Republic on June 21, 1899	Tarlac State University, Romulo Boulevard cor. P. Zamora Avenue, Tarlac City	Filipino	June 21, 2024	

== Zambales ==
This table lists ten markers from the province of Zambales.

Marker title	Description	Location	Language	Date issued	Image
Castillejos	Originally the Pueblo de Uguic in 1743. A guerrilla unit was under the command of Ramon Magsaysay during WWII.	Castillejos	English	1955	
City of Olongapo	Subic Bay, Zambales became a U.S. naval station in 1901. Became a city on June 1, 1966, as approved by Ferdinand Marcos.	Olongapo City Hall, Olongapo City	English	1966	
Himpilang Pandagat ng Look ng Subic (Note: Subic Bay Naval Station)	A trading center even before the Spanish era. Became an American base until 1992 after the senate decided not to ratify the new Military Bases Agreement.	Old Spanish Gate, Subic Bay Freeport Zone, Olongapo City	Filipino	November 26, 2013	
Iba	Founded 1611, birthplace of former president Ramon Magsaysay.	Iba	English	1956	
Philippine Merchant Marine Academy (1820)	Established in 1820 as the Escuela Nautica de Manila.	San Narciso	Filipino	1974	
Provincial Building of Zambales	First constructed by the Spanish Civil Government from 1875 to 1878	Zambales Provincial Capitol, Iba	English	1939	
Ramon Magsaysay (1907–1957)	Known as "The Guy," who became the president of the Philippines from 1953 to 1957.	Iba	Filipino	March 17, 1989	
San Antonio (Pamisaraoan)	Explored and settled by 1830 by Ilocanos from Paoay. The Spaniards surrendered to the Filipinos in June 1898 at Mount Annacangan.	San Antonio	English	1950	
Tahanan ng mga Magsaysay (Note: Home of the Magsaysays)	House of Ramon Magsaysay, seventh President of the Philippines.	Castillejos	Filipino	August 31, 2002	
Teodoro R. Yangco (1861–1939)	Philanthropist and businessman, became president of Young Men's Christian Organization.	San Antonio Town Plaza, San Antonio	Filipino	November 5, 2005	

== See also ==
- List of Cultural Properties of the Philippines in Central Luzon

== Bibliography ==
- National Historical Institute (1993). Historical Markers: Regions I-IV and CAR. National Historical Institute.
- National Historical Institute (2008). Historical Markers (1992–2006). National Historical Institute.
- A list of sites and structures with historical markers, as of 16 January 2012
- A list of institutions with historical markers, as of 16 January 2012
