= Guagua Church =

Roman Catholic church in Pampanga, Philippines

- Immaculate Conception Parish Church
- Parroquia de la Inmaculada Concepcion de Guagua (Spanish)
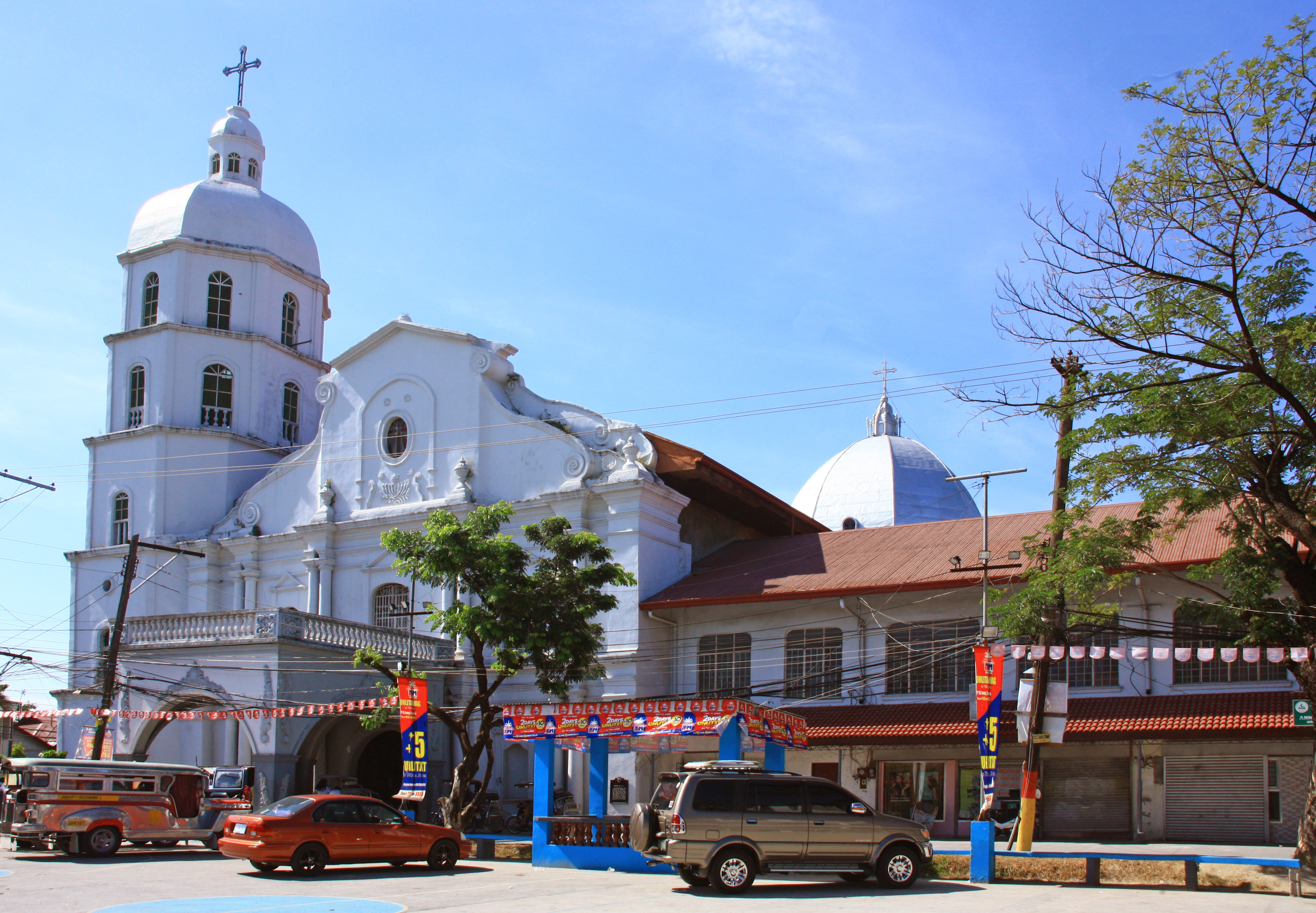
- Guagua Church in 2014

- Location in Luzon Location in the Philippines
- 14°57′52″N 120°38′2″E
- Location: Plaza Burgos, Guagua, Pampanga
- Country: Philippines
- Denomination: Roman Catholic

History
- Dedication: Immaculate Conception
- Consecrated: 1661

Architecture
- Heritage designation: With marker from the National Historical Committee
- Architect: Fr. Jose Duque
- Architectural type: Church building
- Style: Baroque, Barn-style Baroque

Specifications
- Length: 60 metres (200 ft)
- Width: 16 metres (52 ft)
- Height: 12 metres (39 ft)
- Materials: Sand, gravel, cement, mortar, steel and bricks

Administration
- Province: Ecclesiastical Province of San Fernando
- Archdiocese: Roman Catholic Archdiocese of San Fernando

Clergy
- Archbishop: Most. Rev. Florentino G. Lavarias
- Priest: Rev. Fr. Arnolfo Magdaleno F. Serrano

Immaculate Conception Parish Church, commonly known as Guagua Church, is a 17th-century Baroque church located at Brgy. Plaza Burgos, Guagua, Pampanga, Philippines. It is under the care of the Immaculate Conception parish of the Roman Catholic Archdiocese of San Fernando. In 1982, a historical marker bearing the brief history of the church was installed on the facade by the church by the National Historical Committee, precursor of the National Historical Commission of the Philippines.

== History ==
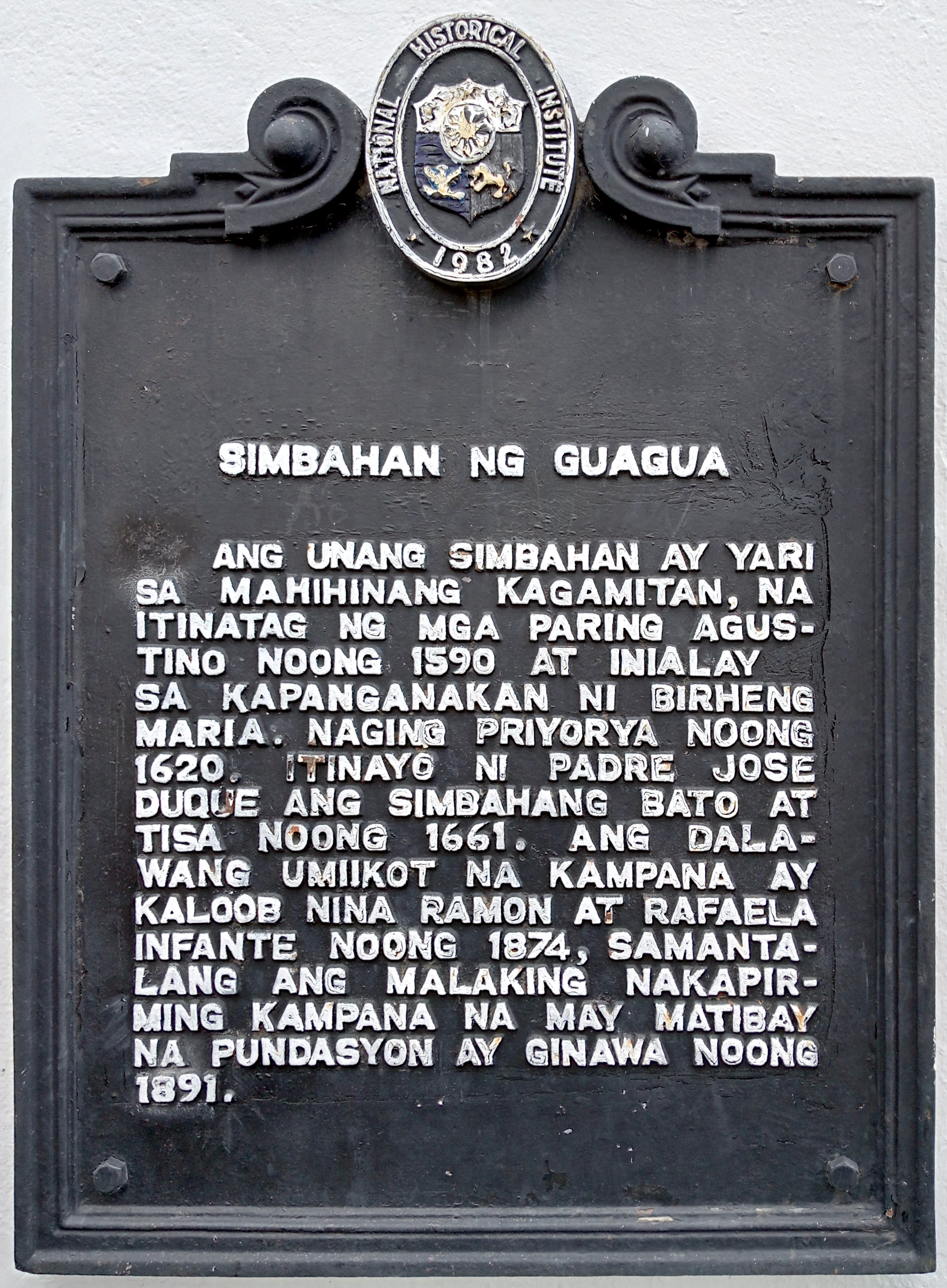
Church NHI historical marker installed in 1982

Historical records indicate that by May 17, 1590, the convent of Guagua has been established by the Augustinian Friars, with Father Bernardino de Quevedo and Father Juan de Zabala as resident priests. Its first titular patron is the Nativity of Our Lady. The construction of the present-day church structures would have been started in 1641, when the convent of Guagua was relieved of paying its rent to San Agustin Monastery in Manila. Such exemption from dues has been attributed to the monetary need of the parochial leaders in supervising the building of a parochial building. Father Jose Duque, a prolific church builder, was assigned parish priest of Guagua in 1661. The present church is attributed to him. Father Duque is said to have been influential in the pacification of Kapampangan rebels in 1660. Another notable figure in the history of the church of Guagua is Father Manuel Carrillo. Father Carrillo, during his term as parish priest around 1762, signed a loan covering some of the properties of the local convent for the renovations of the church. The current stone convent is attributed as one of his works. Several significant improvements in the church structure followed. In 1862, Father Antonio Bravo had the church interiors painted while in 1886, Father Paulino Fernandez installed the church dome. It was also during the late 19th century that Doña Carmen Macau had an organ installed in the church, an organ that was once dubbed as the best in Pampanga. In the 1990s, the stone convent was razed by fire.

== Architecture ==
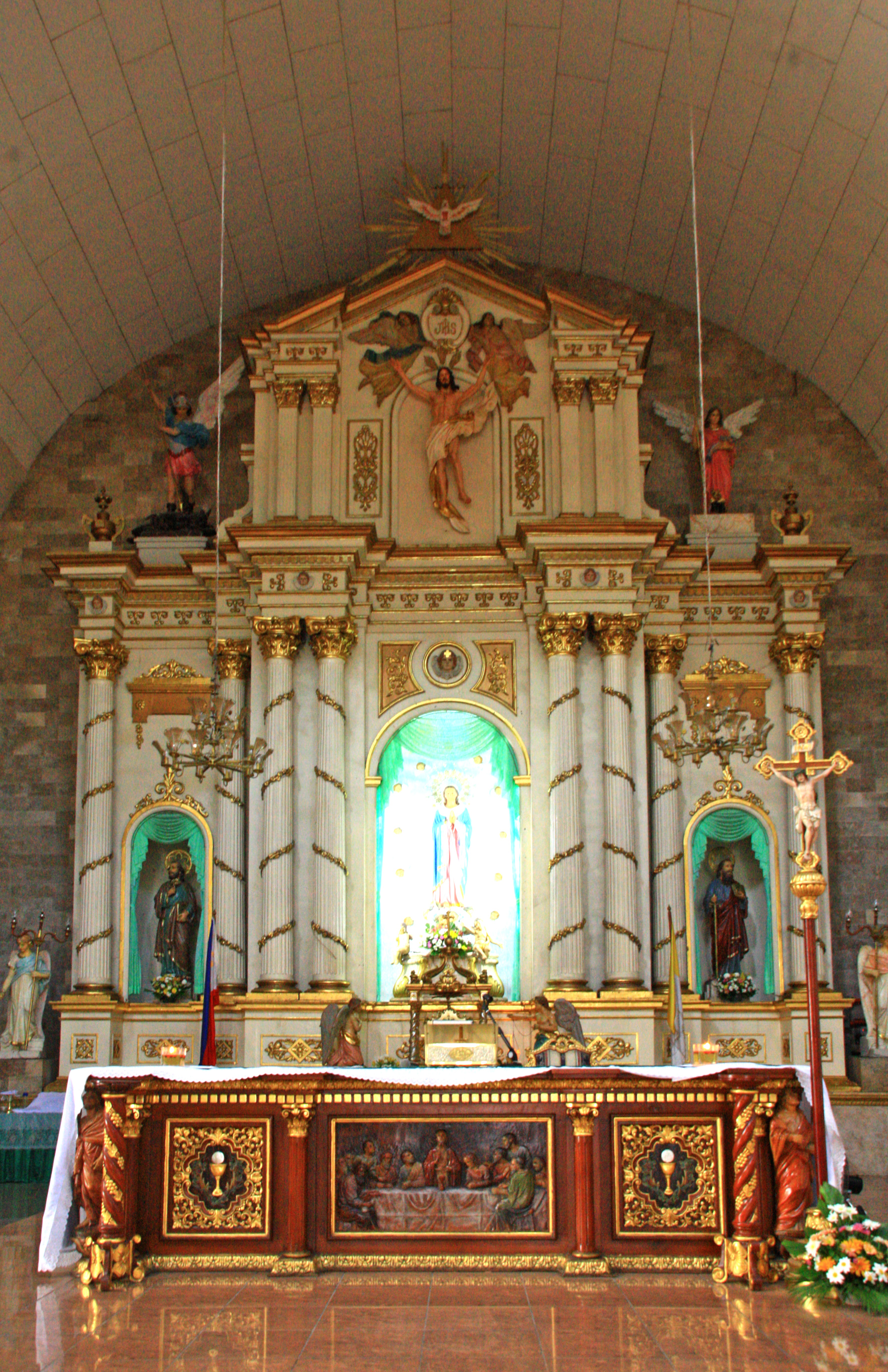
Main altarpiece by local artist Willy Layug

The present brick and stone church is Barn-style Baroque architecture, typically seen in many Spanish-era churches in the Philippines. The facade has two levels topped with a pediment bearing volutes that contrast with the slender columns. Specially notable about the embellishments on the facade are embossed shells found at the base of the pediment and plant motifs found in the retablo on the pediment. Attached to the right of the church is a 5-level octagonal bell tower. The church measures 60 metres (200 ft) long, 16 metres (52 ft) wide and 12 metres (39 ft) high and is built in a cruciform manner.

== Gallery ==
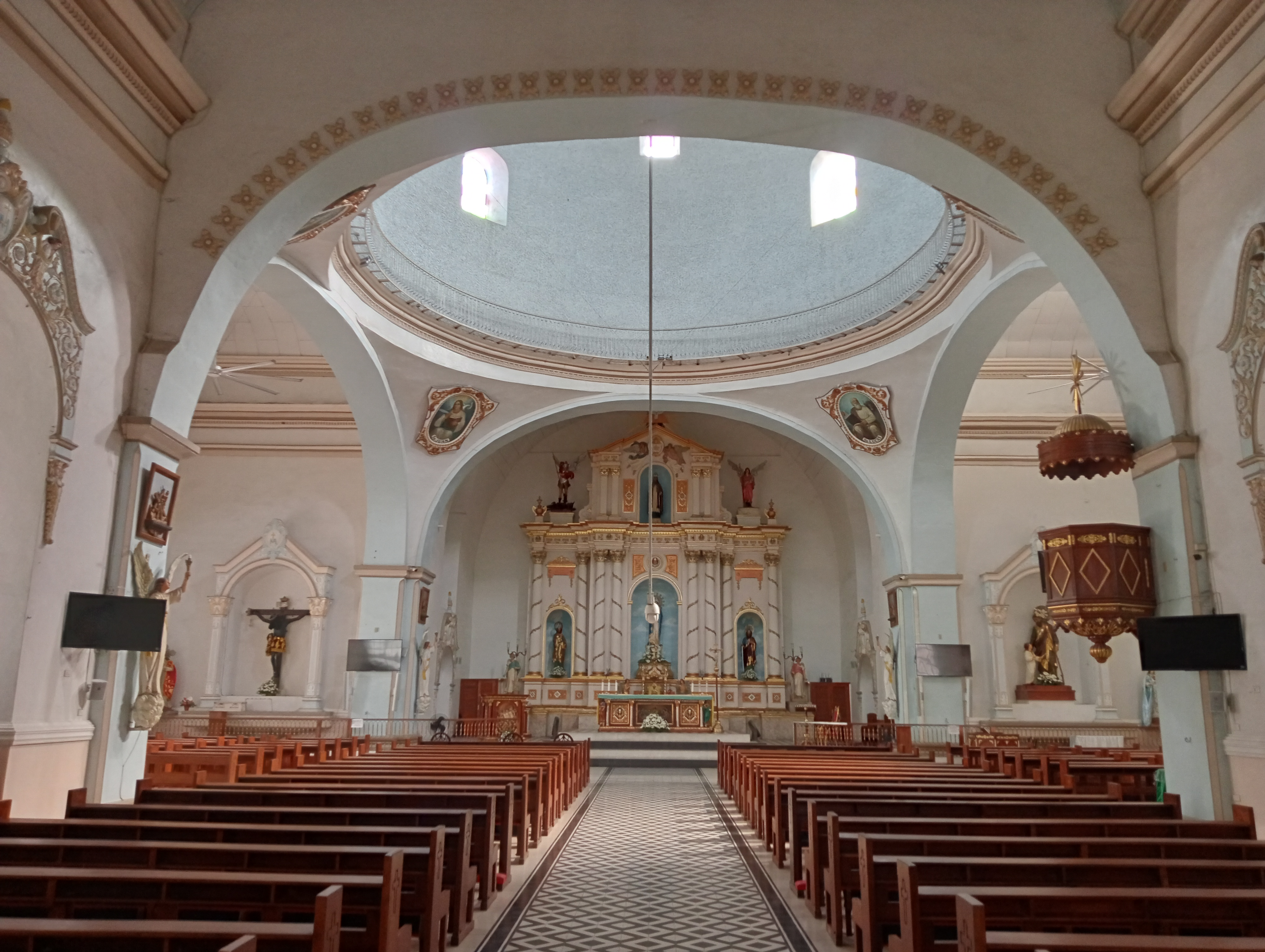
Church interior in 2024

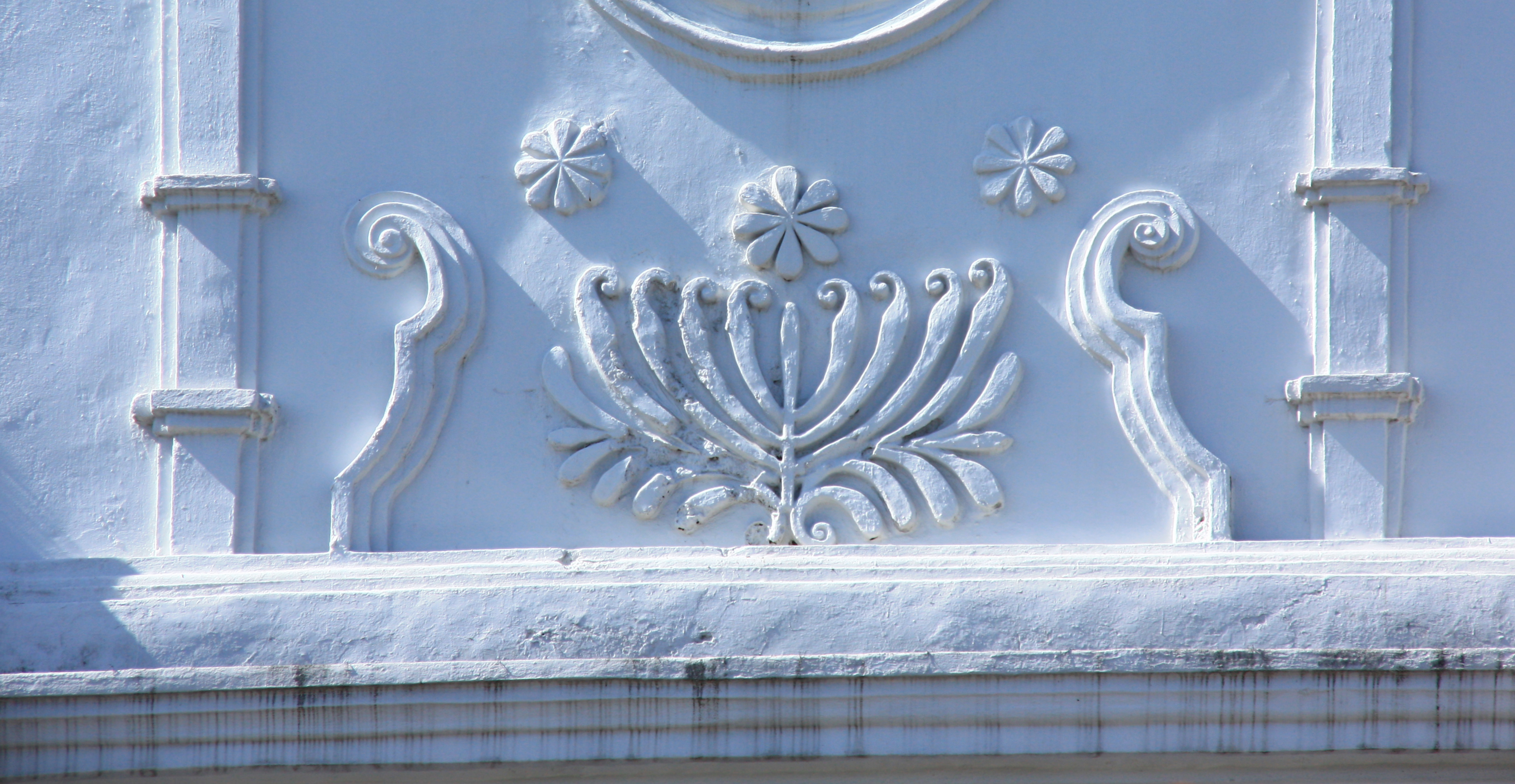
Plant embellishments found on the pediment

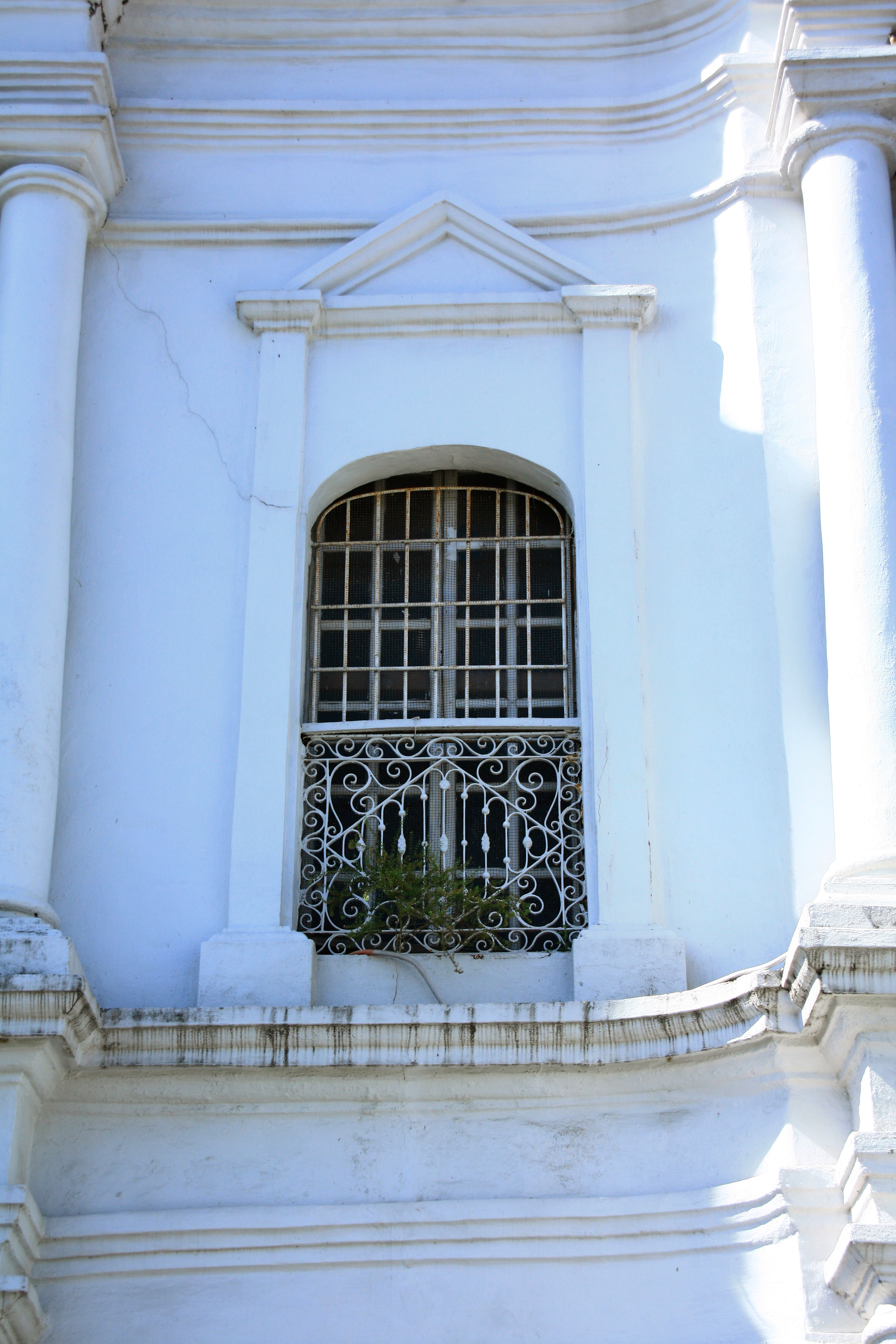
Details of the window and columns

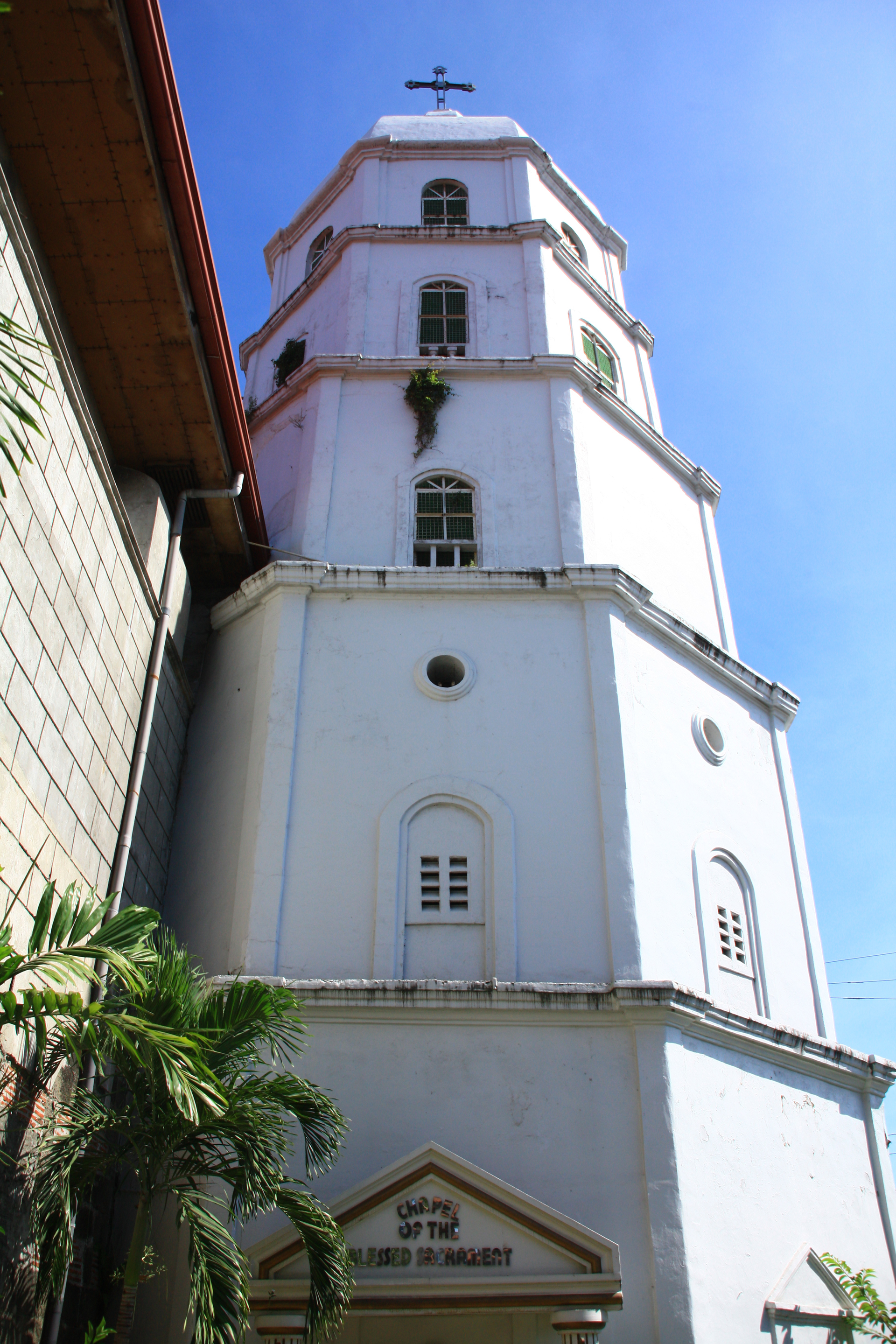
Back view of the belfry

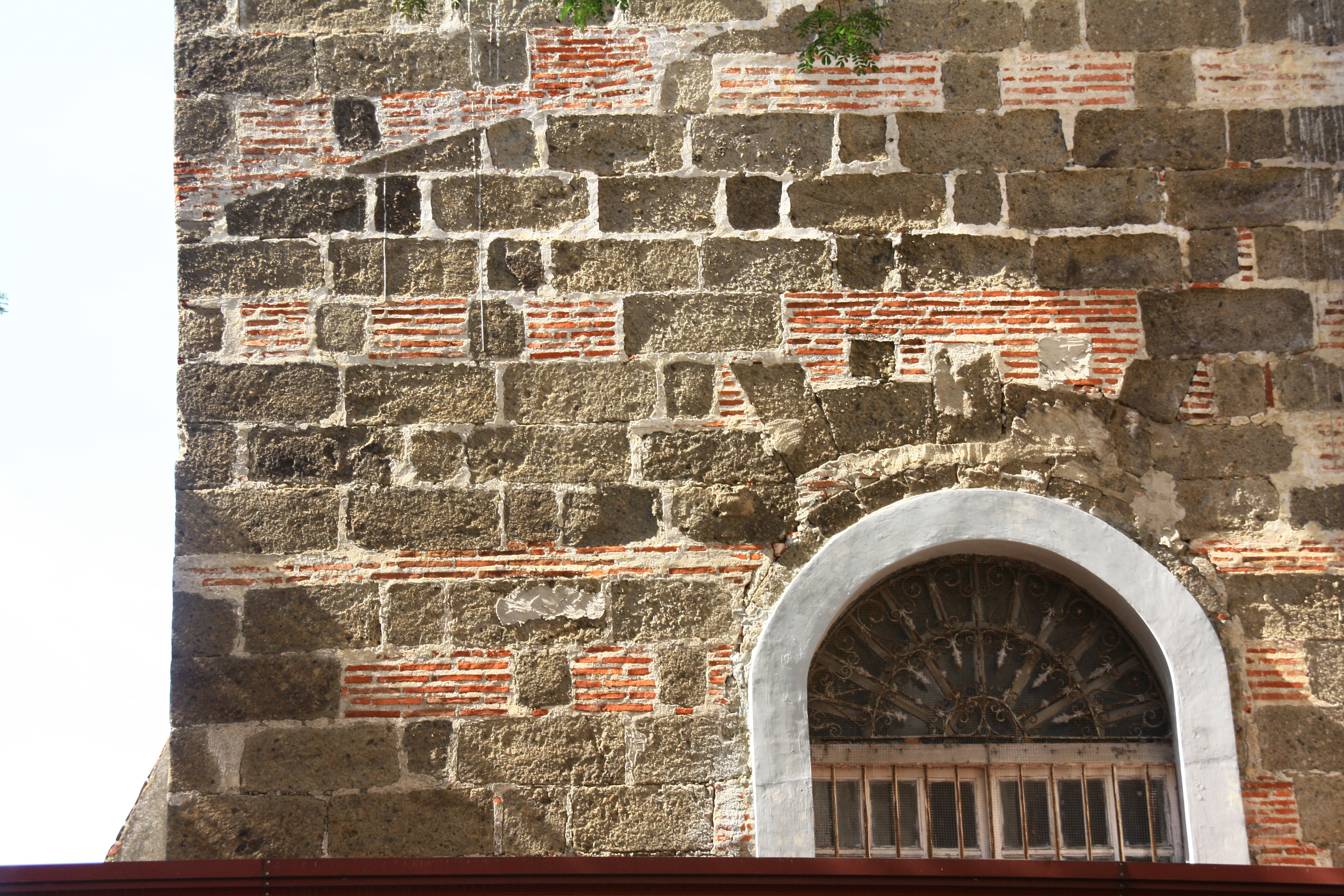
Wall composed of stone and bricks in alternating layers

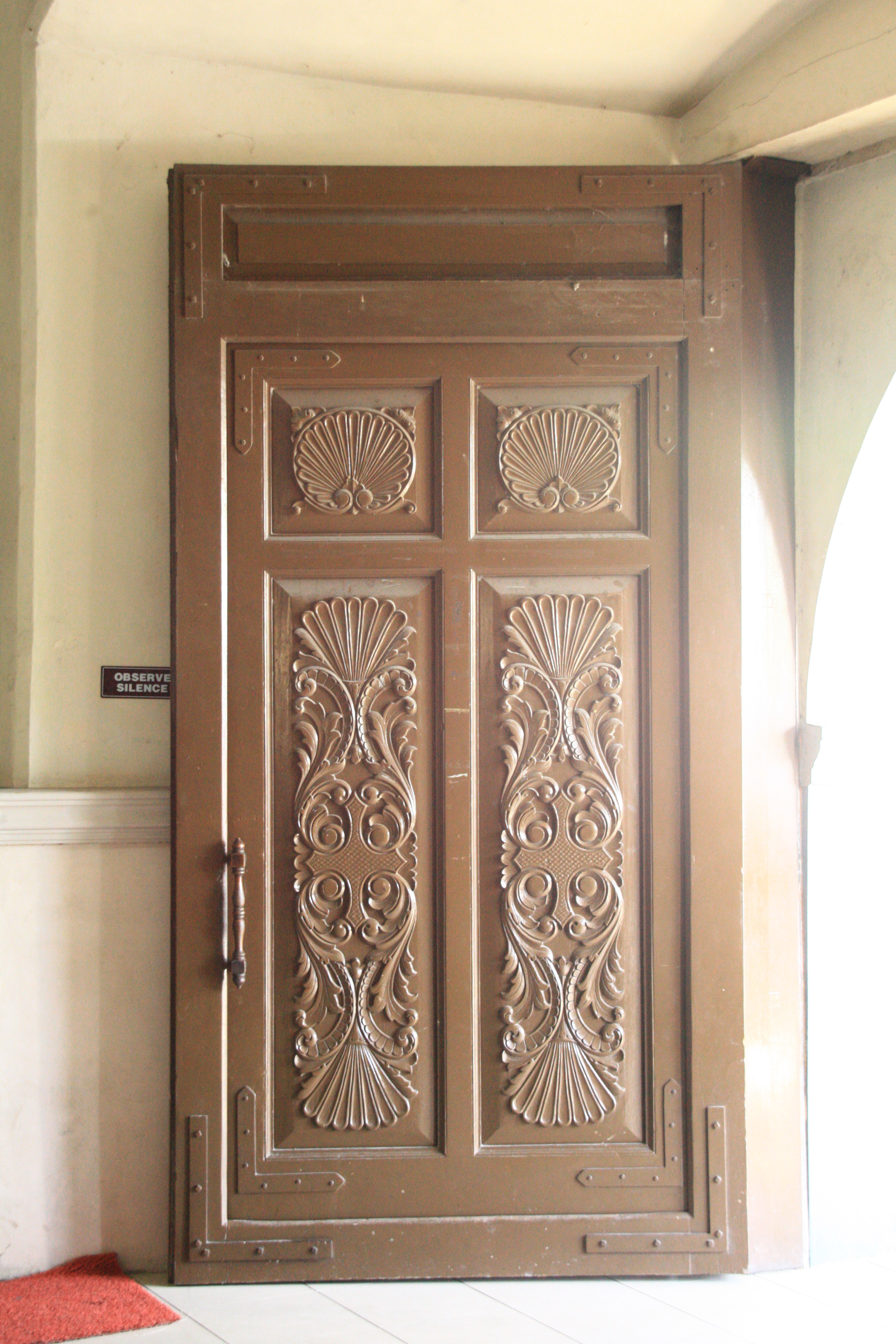
Main door with prominent shell motifs

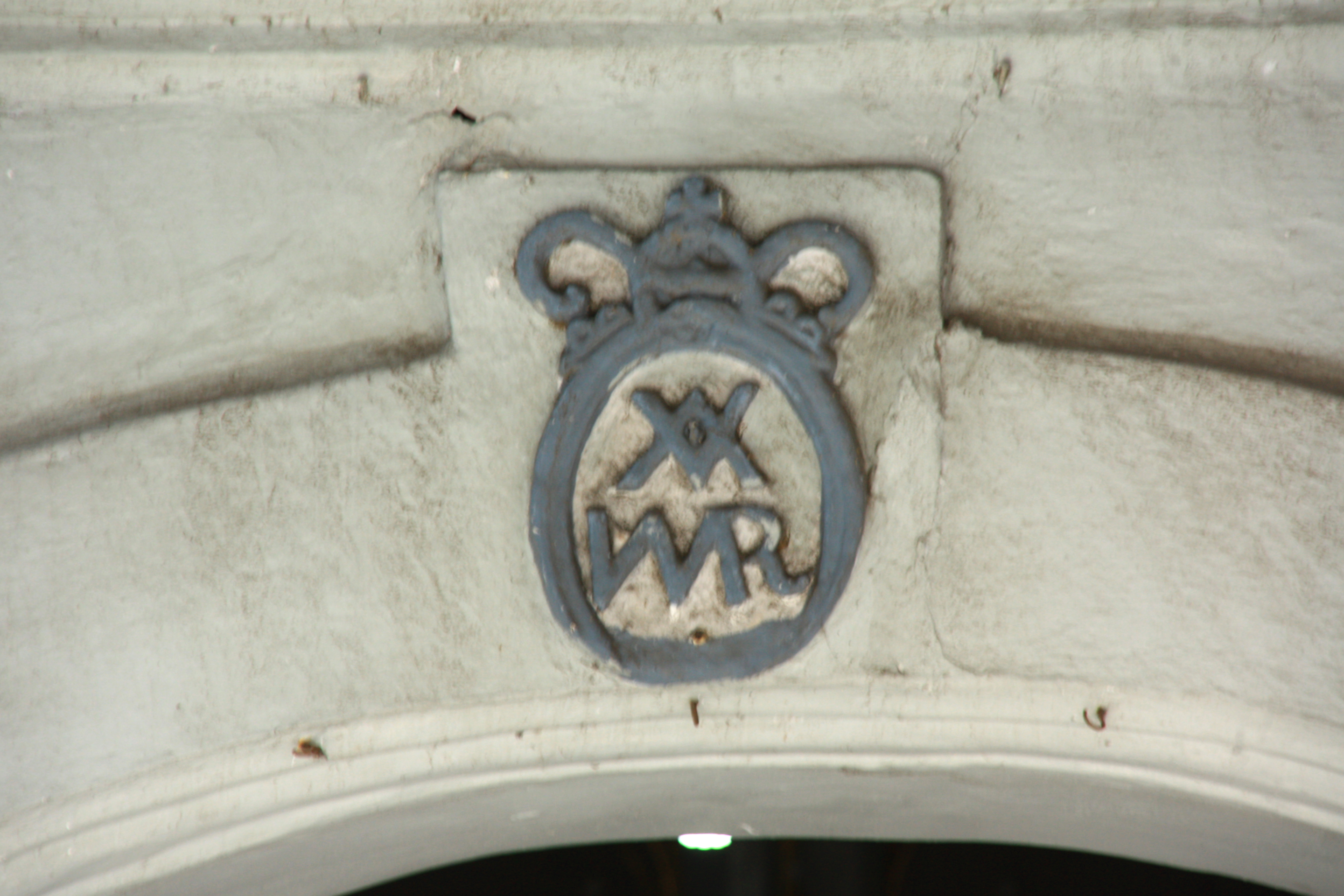
Marian emblem atop the main doorway

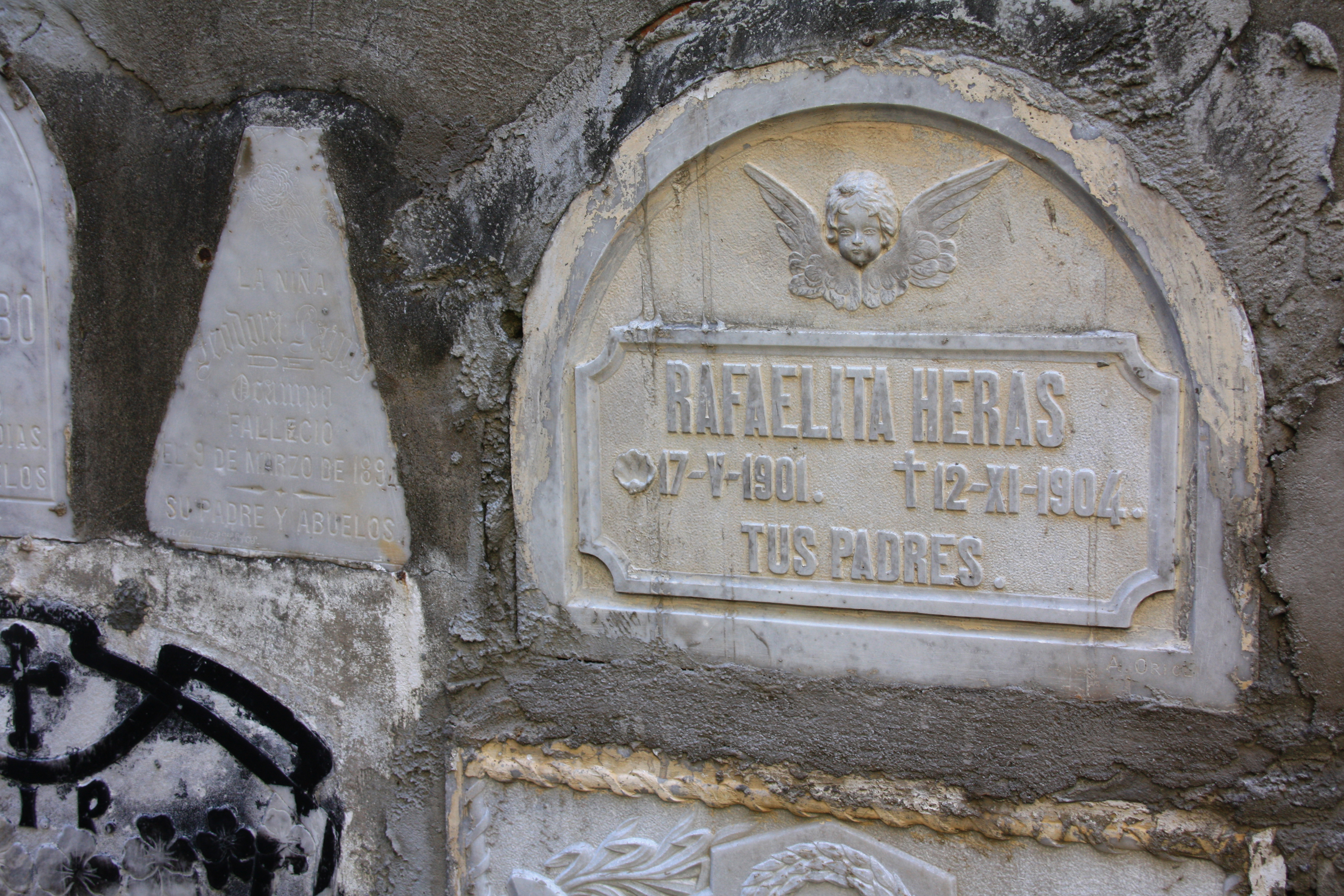
Niches found at the side wall

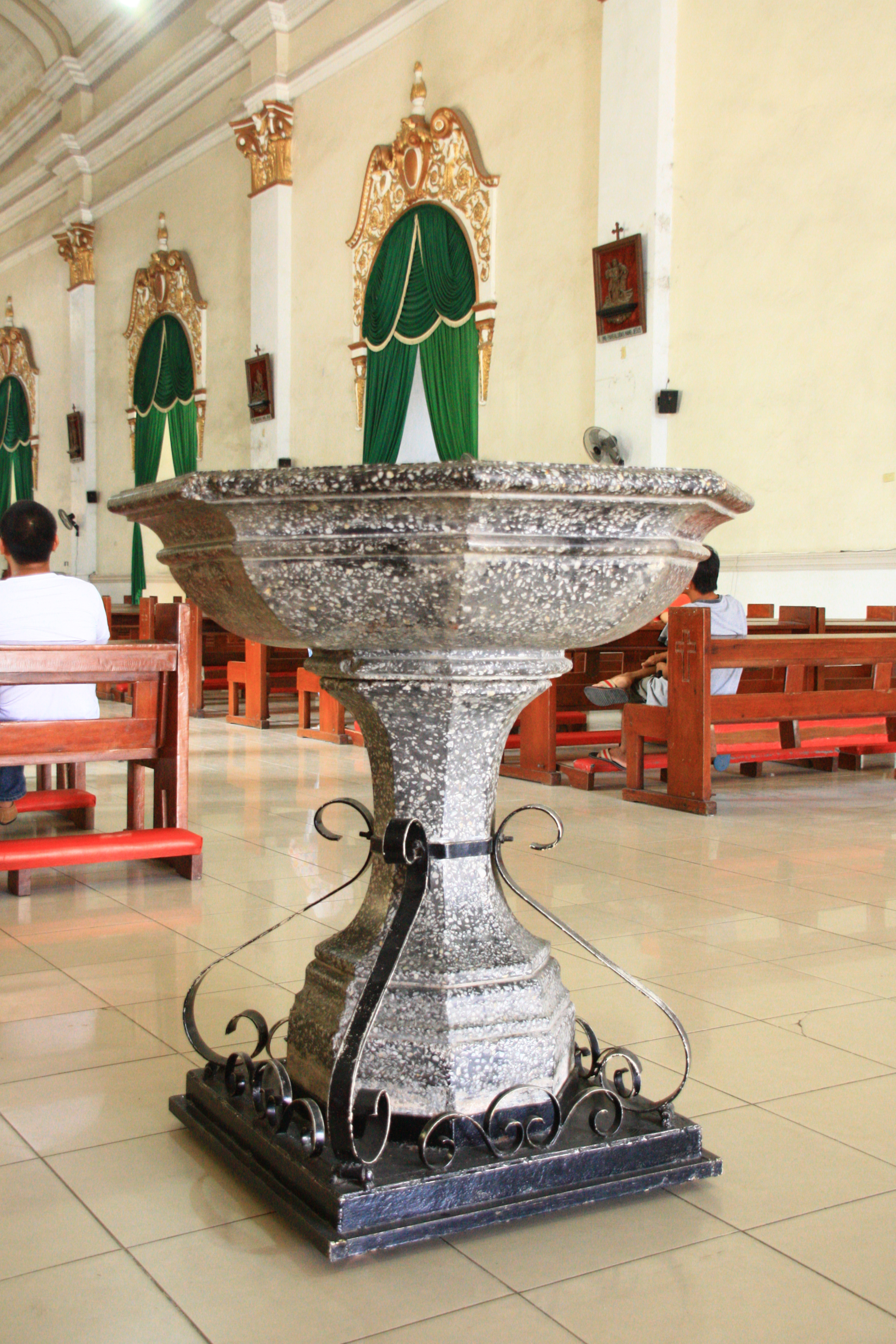
Holy water font

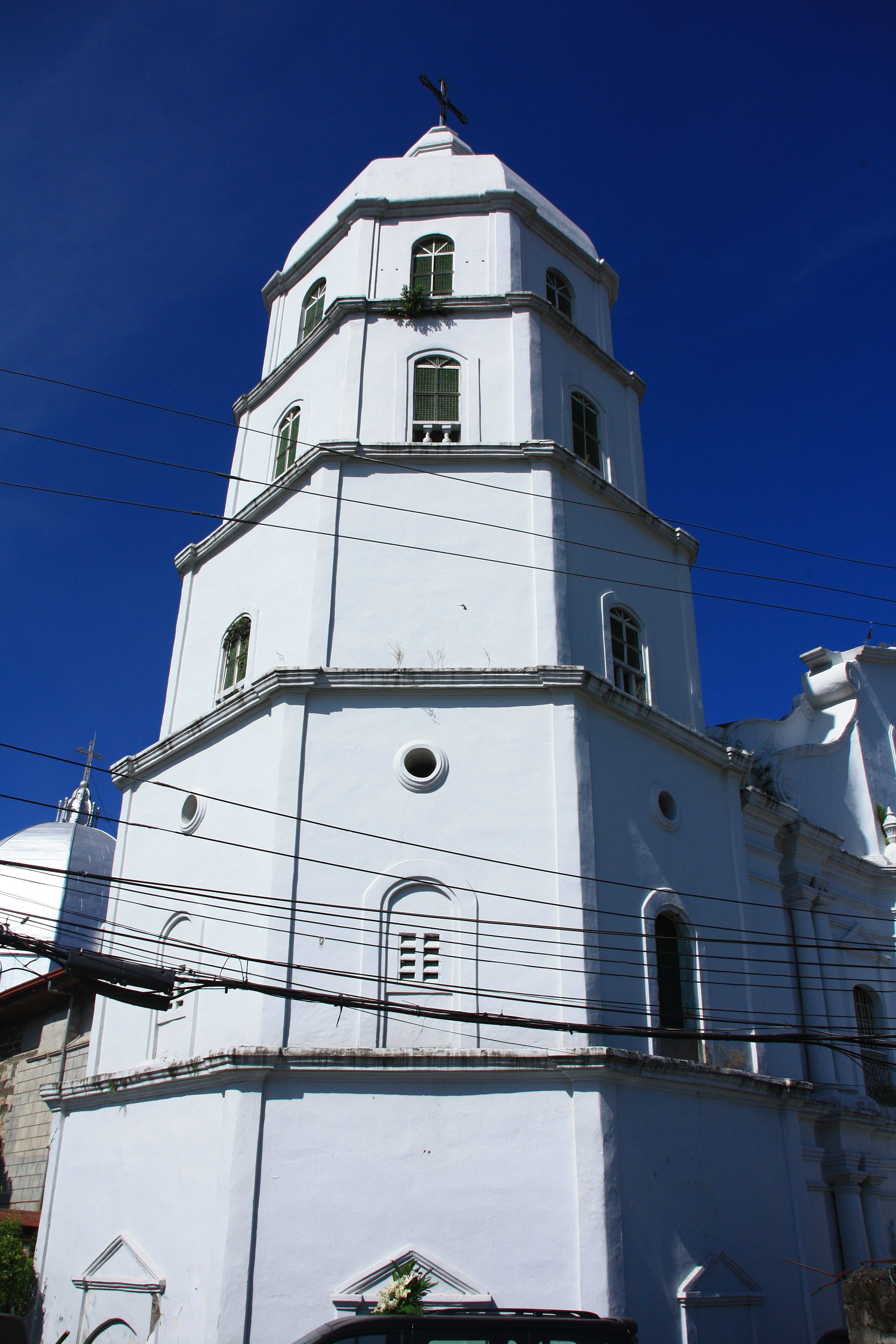
Side view of the belfry

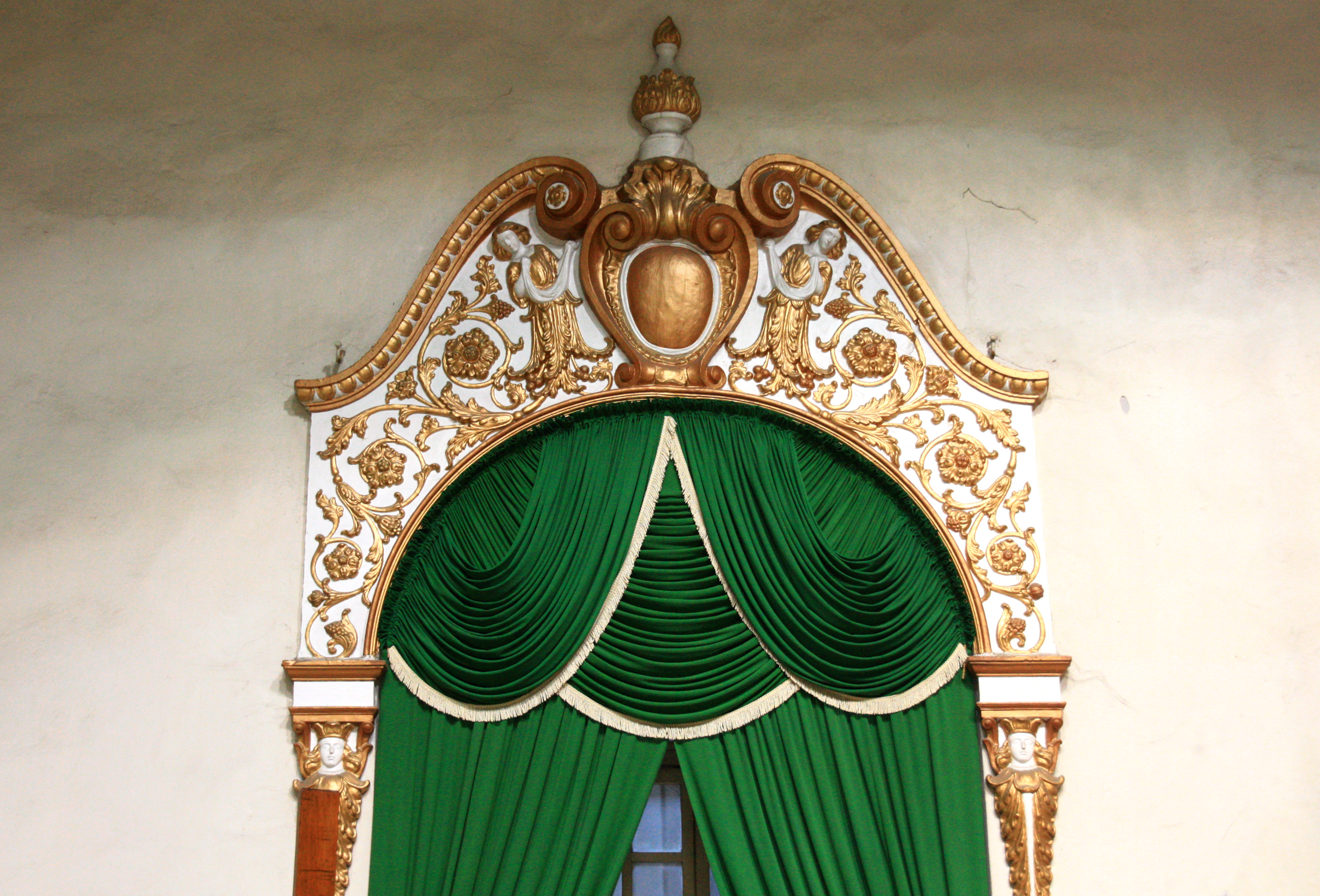
Details of the window border

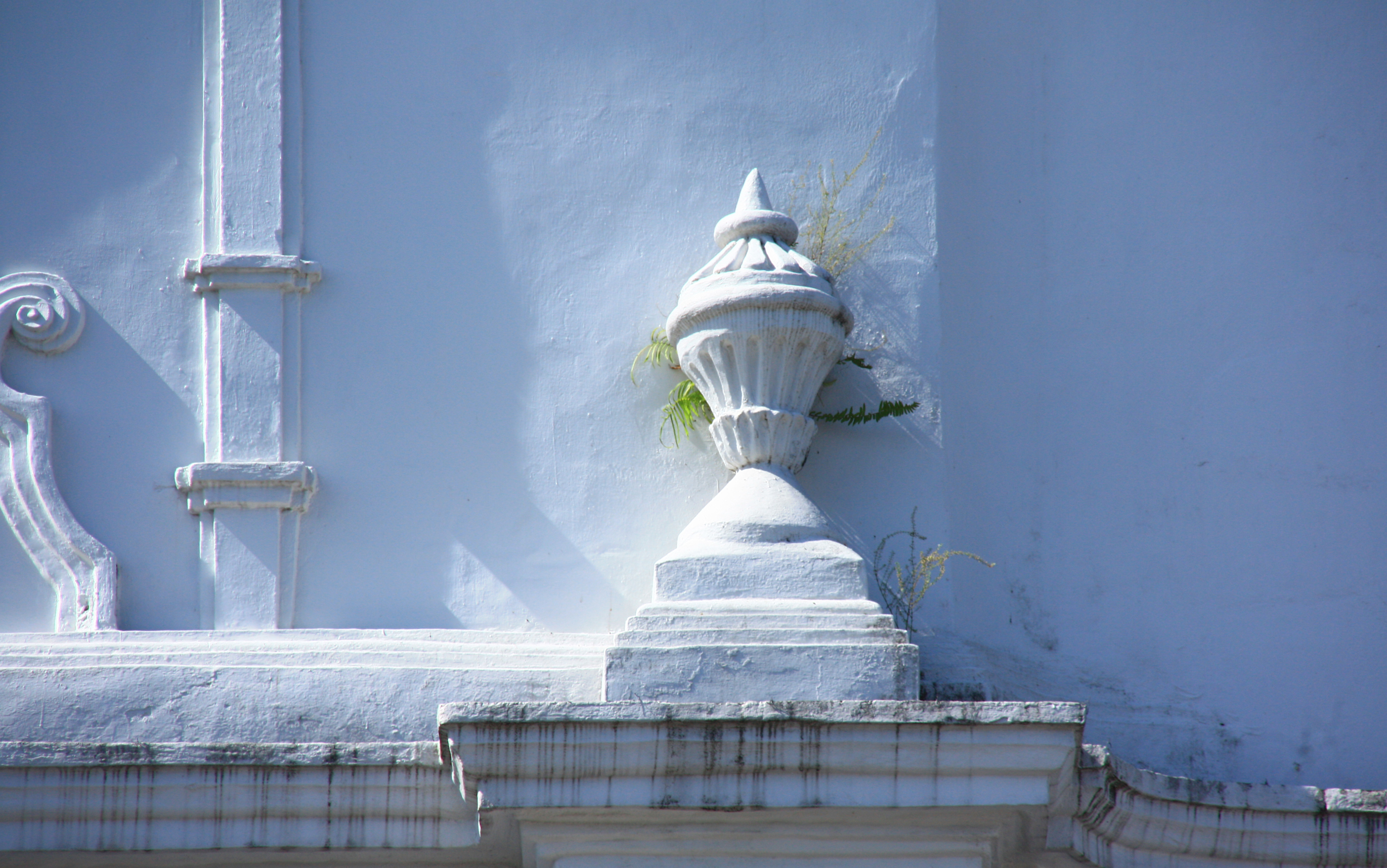
Finials capping the slender columns of the facade

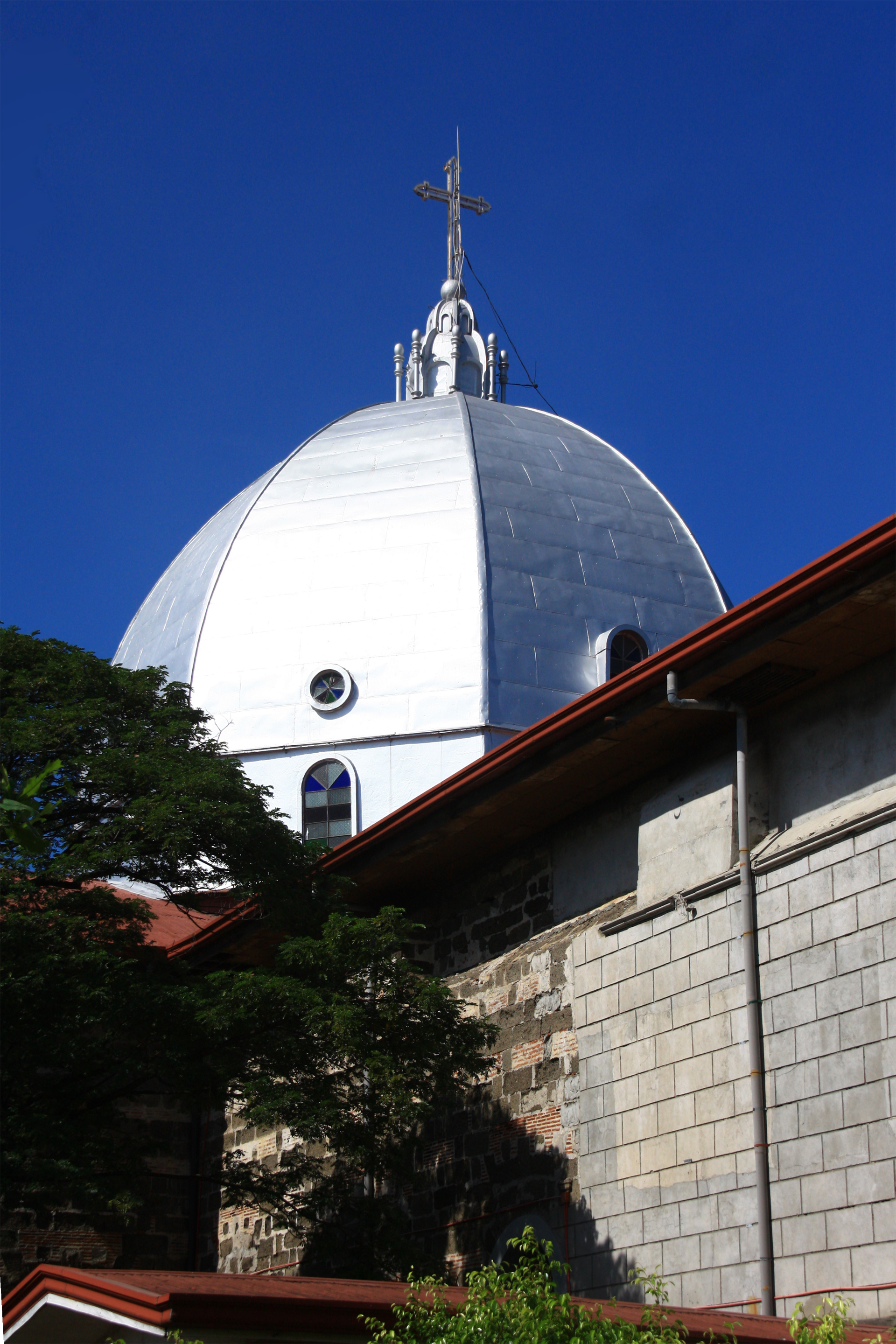
Steel dome

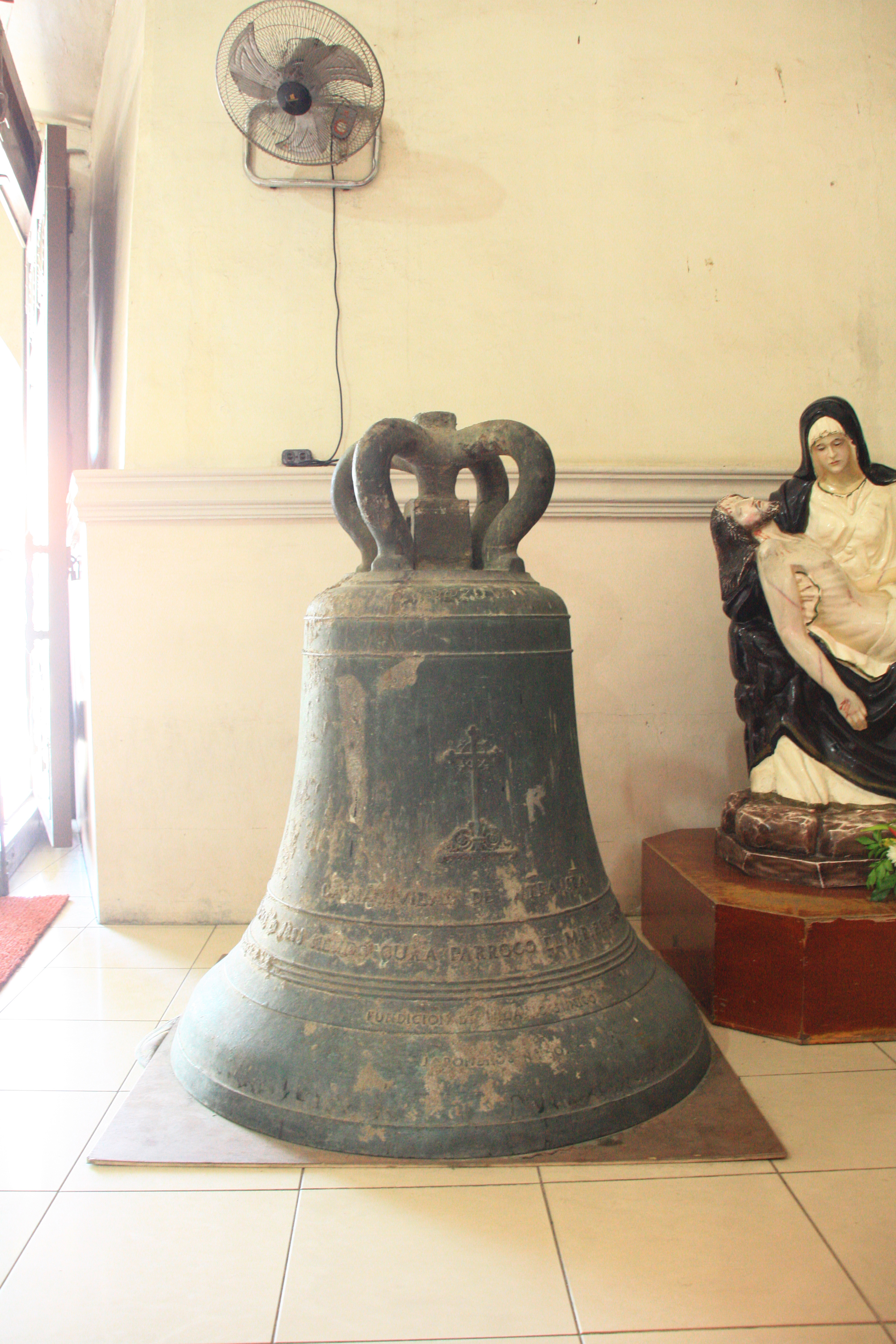
Main bell or Campana Mayor
