= Henson–Hizon House =

Coordinates: 15.0262°N 120.6901°E

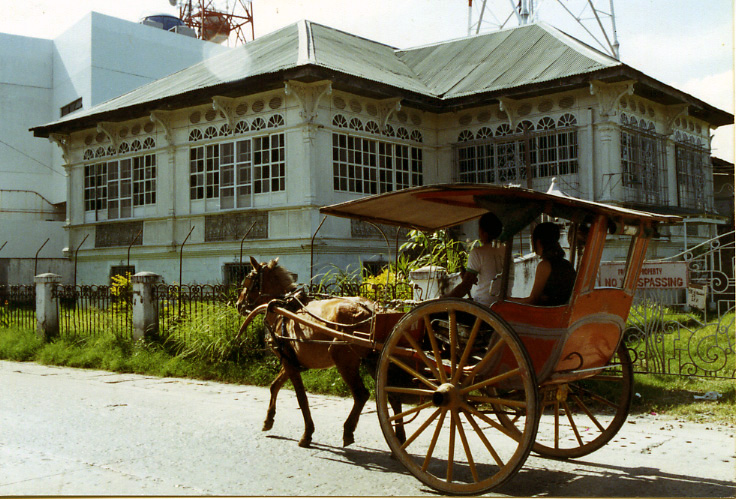
Henson-Hizon House

The Henson-Hizon House is a heritage house in the city of San Fernando, Pampanga, Philippines. This bahay na bato of the Spanish colonial period was declared a Heritage House by the National Historical Institute on 27 January 2003 by virtue of Resolution No. 3, S. 2003.

== History ==
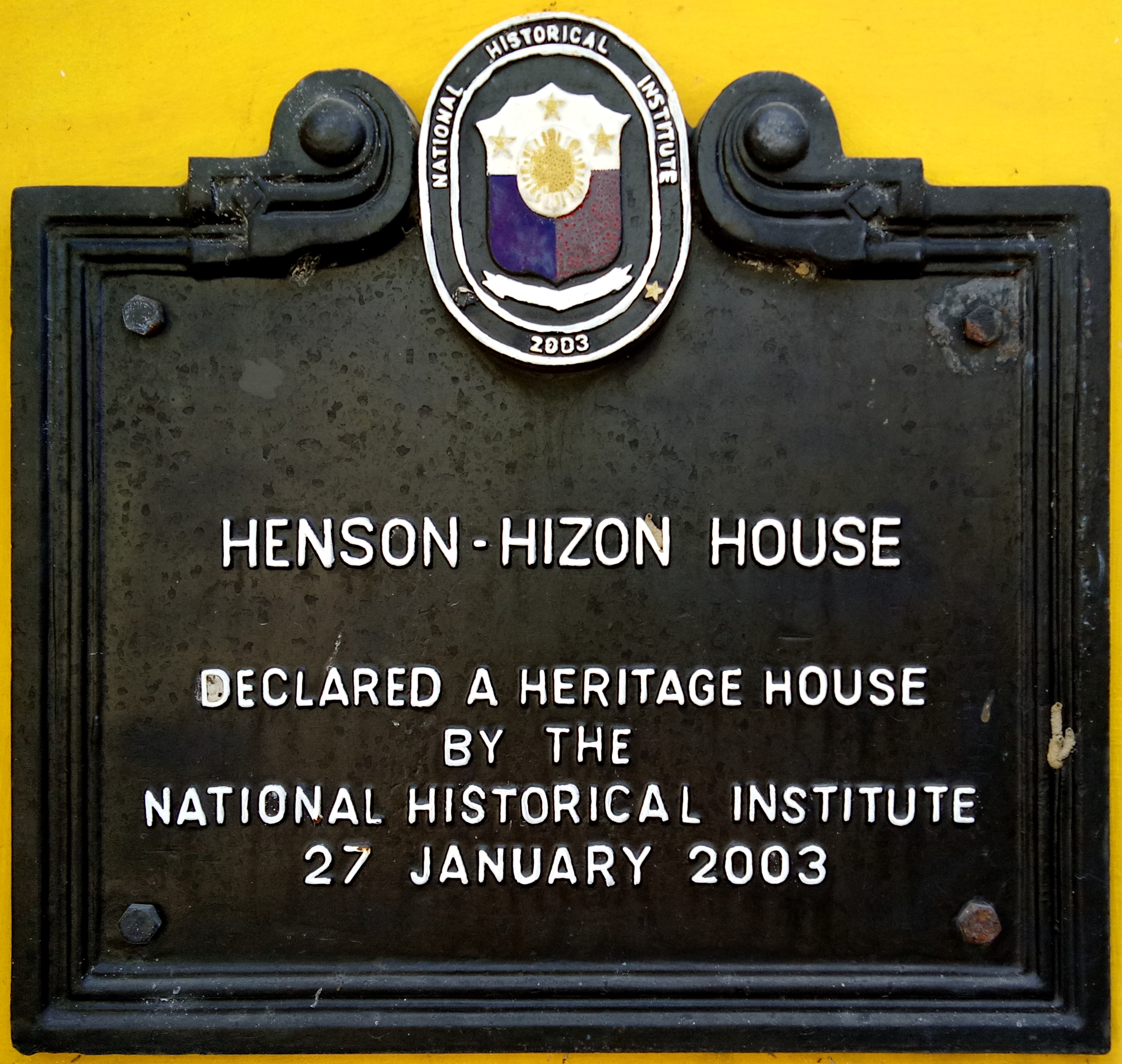
National historical marker declaring the building as a Heritage House

The house was built by Saturnino Henson y David, gobernadorcillo of San Fernando from 1882 to 1883 and 1896 and the first tesorero municipal (municipal treasurer) from 1900 to 1902, and his wife Maria Lacson. It was inherited by their eldest daughter, Juana Henson y Lacson, who was married to Florentino Hizon. It was then inherited by their son Vicente Hizon y Henson, who was married to Concepcion Dizon y Dayrit, then inherited by their son Vicente Hizon y Dizon, who was married to Anastacia de los Reyes. The house was purchased by the couple Pablo Panlilio y Dayrit and Dolores Argüelles. Next to the house is a monument dedicated to the heroic efforts of Nicolasa Dayrit, mother of Pablo Panlilio, a local heroine who helped the wounded and sick Filipino fighters during the Filipino-American War.
