= Mariano Sevilla =

Filipino priest

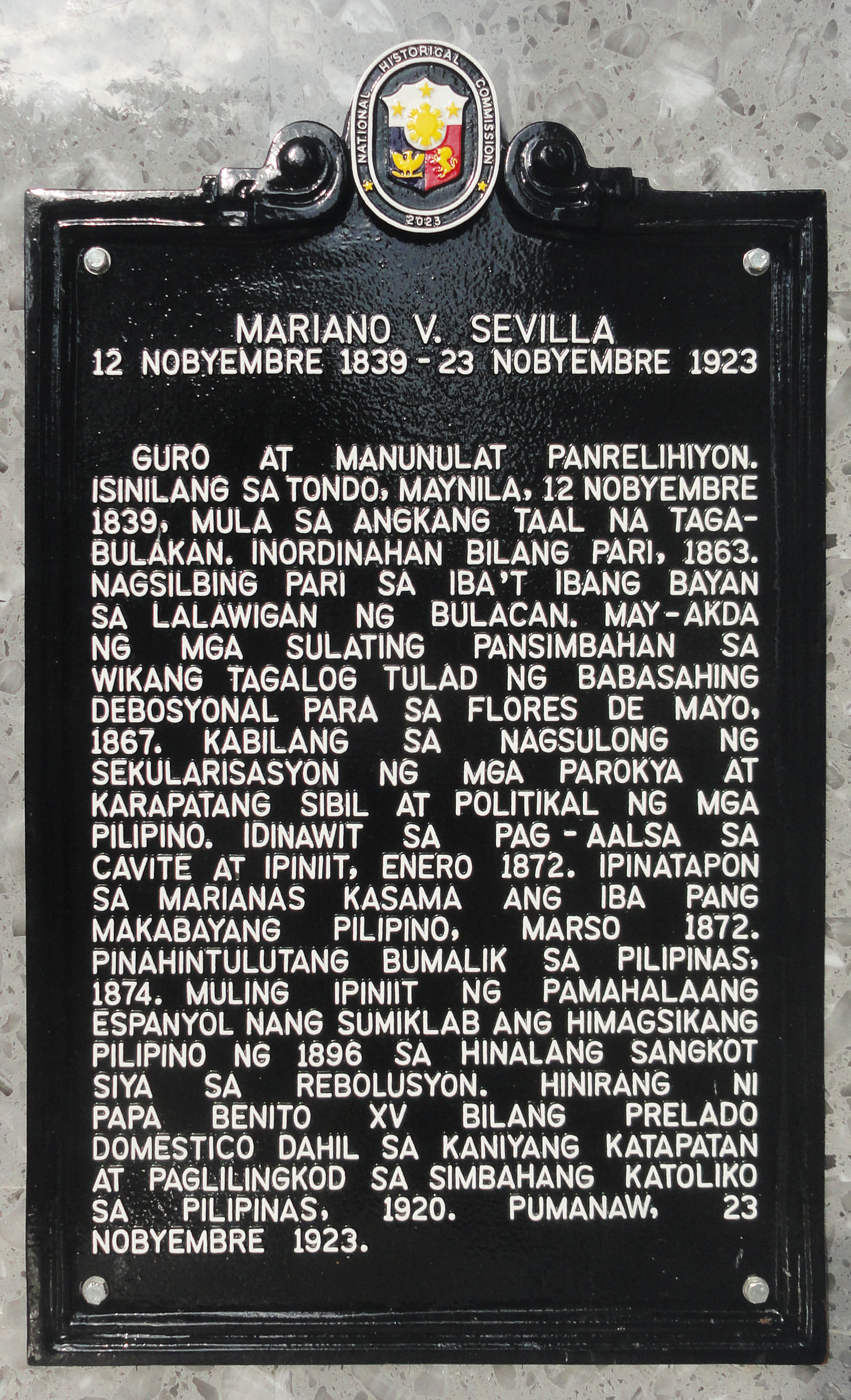
- National Historical Commission of the Philippines (NHCP)'s historical marker
- Born: November 12, 1839; Tondo, Manila, Philippines
- Died: November 23, 1923 (aged 84)
- Burial place: Bulakan Catholic Cemetery, Bulakan, Province of Bulacan
- Education: Philosophy and Theology
- Alma mater: University of Santo Tomas
- Organizations: Hijas y Caballeros de Maria (founder); Colegio de la Sagrada Familia (founder); Instituto de Mujeres, 1900, (co-founder)

Mariano Sevilla (Manila, 12 November 1839 – 23 November 1923) was a Filipino priest, theologian and writer.

== Biography ==
Mariano Sevilla was born on November 12, 1839 in Tondo, Manila. His parents were Tomas Sevilla and Paula Villena. Sevilla was educated at the Colegio de San Juan de Letran and received a Bachelor of Philosophy degree from the University of Santo Tomas (UST) in 1857.

On 1863, Sevilla was ordained as a priest. This was followed by an appointment as coadjutor of the church in San Rafael.

From 1867, he taught at the Real Colegio de San Jose in Manila. He was also secretary of the institution led by Rector Mariano Garcia and he was chaplain of the Beaterio de Santa Rosa.

He continued his studies at the UST, where he obtained his doctorate in theology in 1871.

In 1872, Sevilla was accused of involved in the Cavite Mutiny. He was exiled to the Mariana Islands along with several other priests. He returned to the Philippines in 1877, and worked as a priest and started writing religious literatures in Tagalog.

In 1879 he founded the Colegio de La Sagrada Familia and in 1881 he was appointed chaplain of the military hospital in Manila. Sevilla was arrested and imprisoned after the outbreak of the Philippine Revolution in 1896. He was released in 1898.

Sevilla advocated for unity of state and religion. To express his views on this matter, he founded the daily newspaper El Catolico Filipino, which was circulated in Malolos from 1898 to 1899.

Under the American colinization period, Sevilla co-founded Instituto de Mujeros in 1900, a women's school in Manila. A year later, he was appointed as a priest in Hagonoy.

Sevilla wrote and translated religious literature. For example, he wrote a collection of prayers and chants in Tagalog that are still used today during Flores de Mayo.

Sevilla died in Manila in 1923 at the age of 84, and buried in Bulacan.
