= Pampanga Provincial Capitol =

Pampanga Capitol
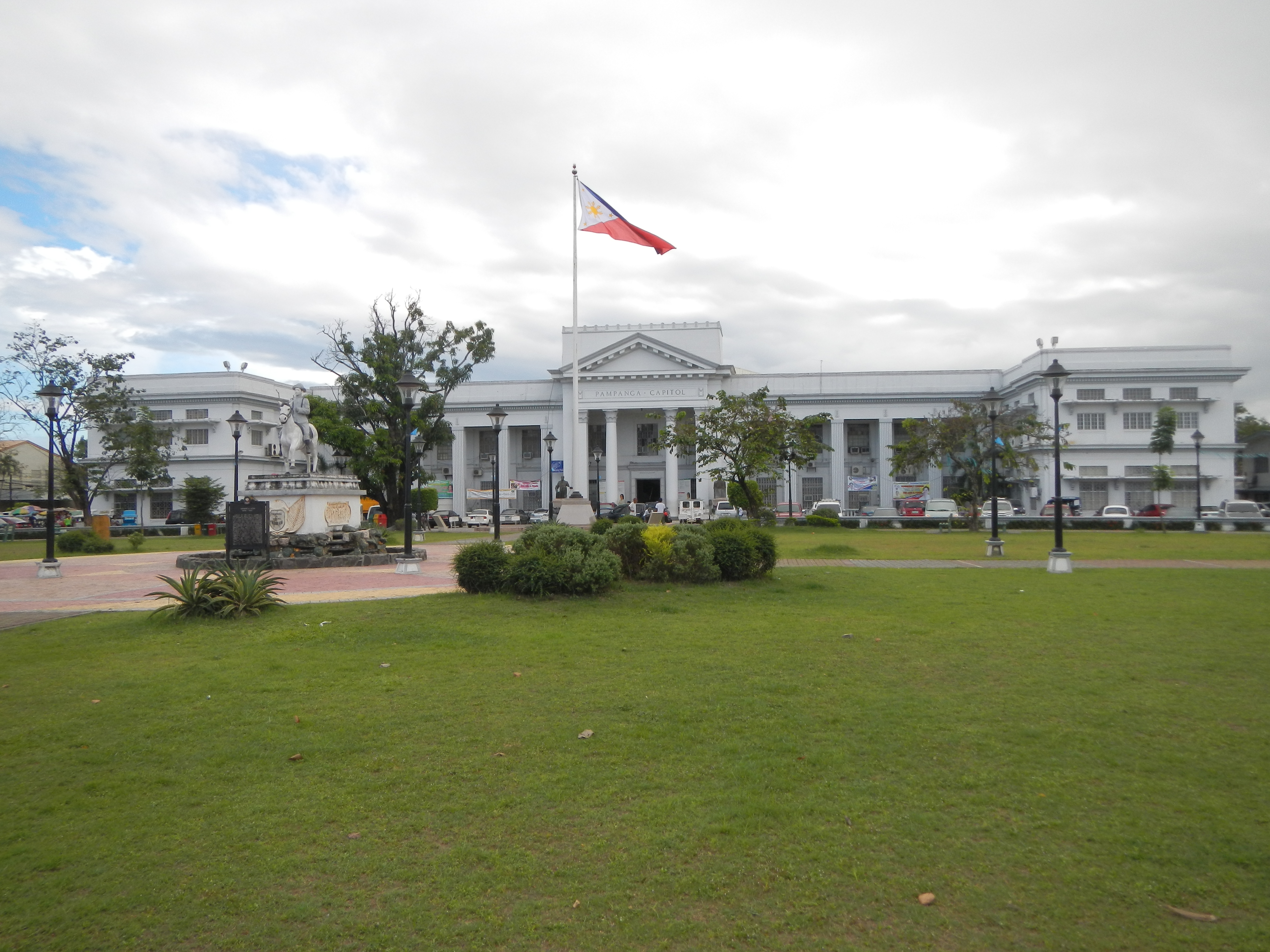
- Façade of the Capitol

- Location within Luzon Location within Philippines
- Alternative names: Provincial Capitol of Pampanga

General information
- Type: Neoclassical
- Location: San Fernando City, Pampanga, Philippines
- Coordinates: 15°01′26″N 120°41′14″E
- Current tenants: Office of the Governor; Provincial Government of Pampanga
- Construction started: 1907
- Completed: 1908

Design and construction
- Architecture firm: Bureau of Public Works

The Pampanga Capitol is the seat of government of the province of Pampanga in the Philippines. The original building was constructed shortly after the provincial capital of Pampanga was transferred from Bacolor to San Fernando in 1904. Annexes were added before the war. It was the site of a major battle between the Philippine Commonwealth troops and local guerrilla forces and the Japanese Imperial Army during World War II.

The Pampanga Provincial Capitol is one of the most beautiful civil architectural landmarks in the province.

== History ==
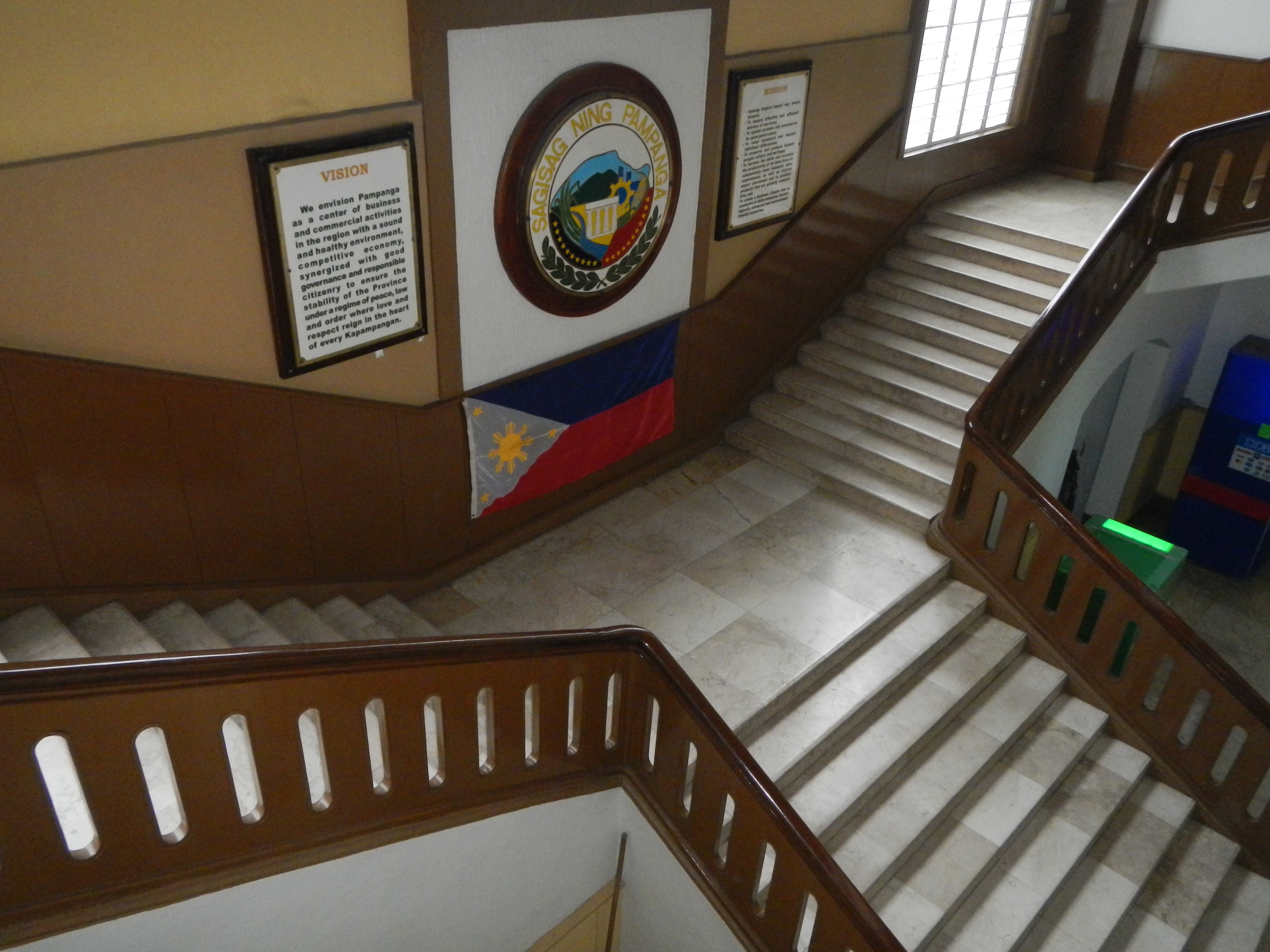
Interior

The original provincial Capitol grounds of Pampanga in San Fernando covered an area of about 12 hectares. The Capitol was erected in 1907–1908, during the administration of Governor Macario Arnedo and no expenses were spared from making the seat of the local government, truly an attractive tourist attraction in itself.

The expansive grounds are lush with landscaping, planted with mango and acacia trees, shrubs and flowering plants. The wooded area was named Silva Park, after the late provincial treasurer of Pampanga, Isabelo de Silva, who led in the drive to beautify the Capitol surroundings.

When the age of electricity reached the province, the major lanes and walkways were lined and lit with Doric-style electric lamps; a radio system was installed to entertain the visiting public.

One of the earliest structures stands in front of the Capitol Building—a stately statue of Gen. Maximino Hizon of Mexico, the highest ranking Kapampangan officer in the revolutionary army. He distinguished himself in many battles against the Spanish and American forces during the Philippine Revolution. Captured by Americans in June 1900, he was exiled to Guam together with other war leaders on 7 January 1901 and died there on 1 Sept. 1901. The patriot is depicted in full uniform, astride a handsome steed. The statue was installed in 1919, a donation of the Kapampangan people and the provincial government. As this picture shows, the monument was favorite ‘photo opportunity’ spot for many local visitors.

In 1929, an additional attraction—the Provincial Zoological Garden—was established, featuring a rare collection of caged exotic birds and rare animals for the public to enjoy. Tourists would even stop by Pampanga to view the mini-zoo en route to Baguio. The garden complemented the several tennis courts, the bandstand or glorietta, the clubhouse and the park benches.

== Events ==
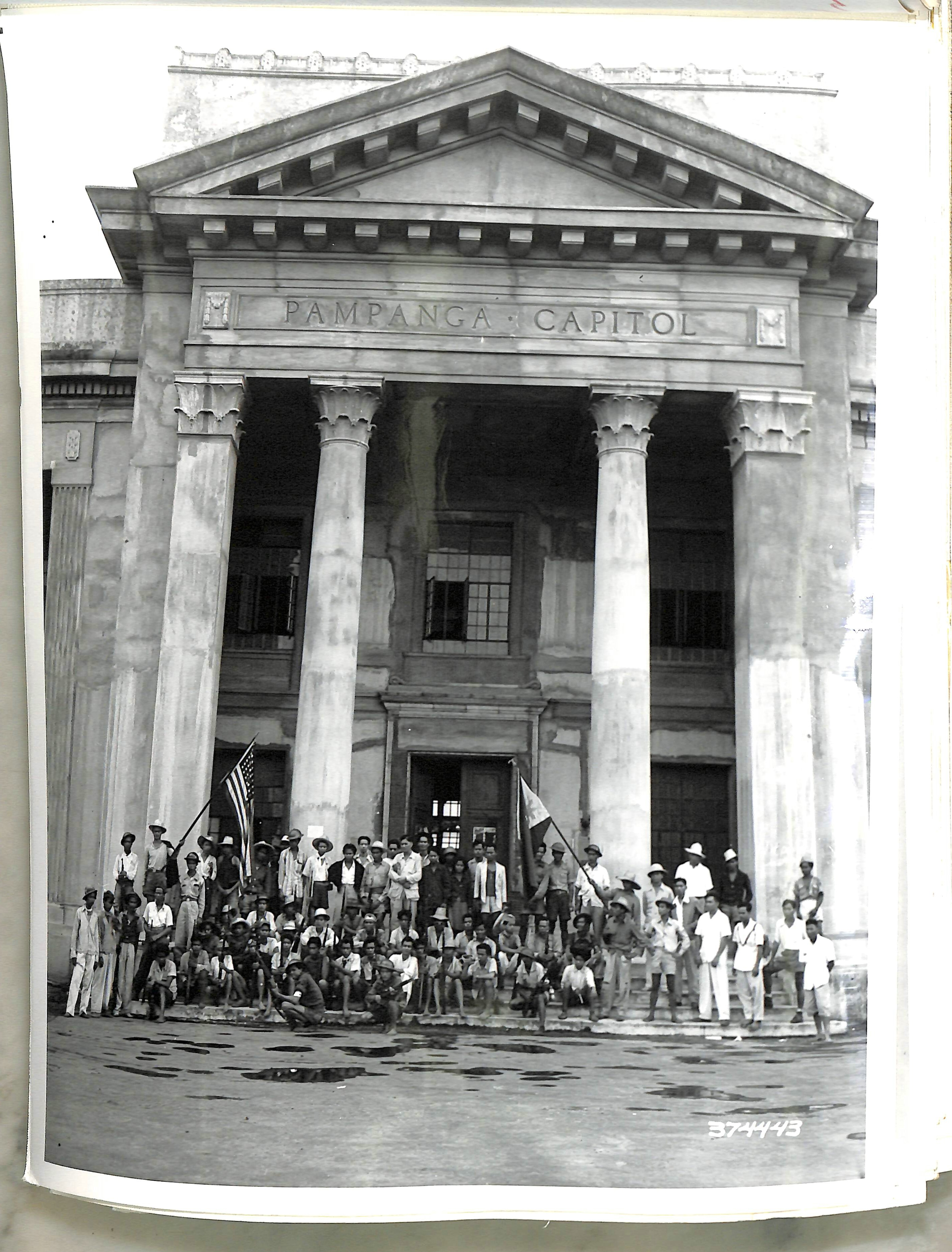
Pampanga Provincial Capitol during World War II in 1945

When San Fernando played host to the biggest spectacle of the province in 1933, the Capitol Grounds became the venue for the Pampanga Carnival Fair and Exposition. The Carnival was meant to promote Pampanga as the richest market outside of Manila, with rich limitless agricultural, commercial and industrial possibilities. Pavilions of the 21 towns of Pampanga were put up, featuring the best and finest products of each community. The fair was capped with the election of Miss Pampanga.

Visitors from all over the country left the province very much impressed after having seen the events as well as the impressive venue. After the Carnival, a Rizal Memorial Forum was erected at the site of the provincial fair, at a cost of Php 18,000.

Most of these points of interest are long gone from the Provincial Capitol grounds—some destroyed by the War, others by overzealous reconstruction and expansion projects. Only the Hizon Monument at the Arnedo Park remains, now nearly a century-old, a mute witness to the scenic wonder of the place, that once marked the hallowed grounds of Pampanga's Provincial Capitol.
