= Ancestral houses of the Philippines =

Filipino heritage houses

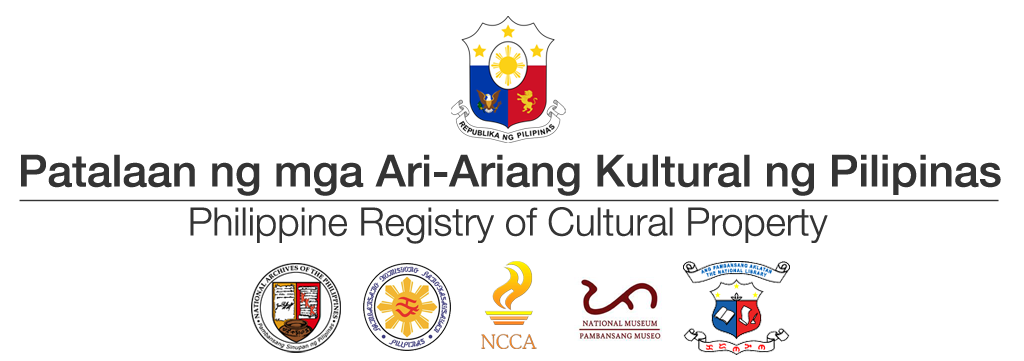
Current logo for the Philippine Registry of Cultural Property

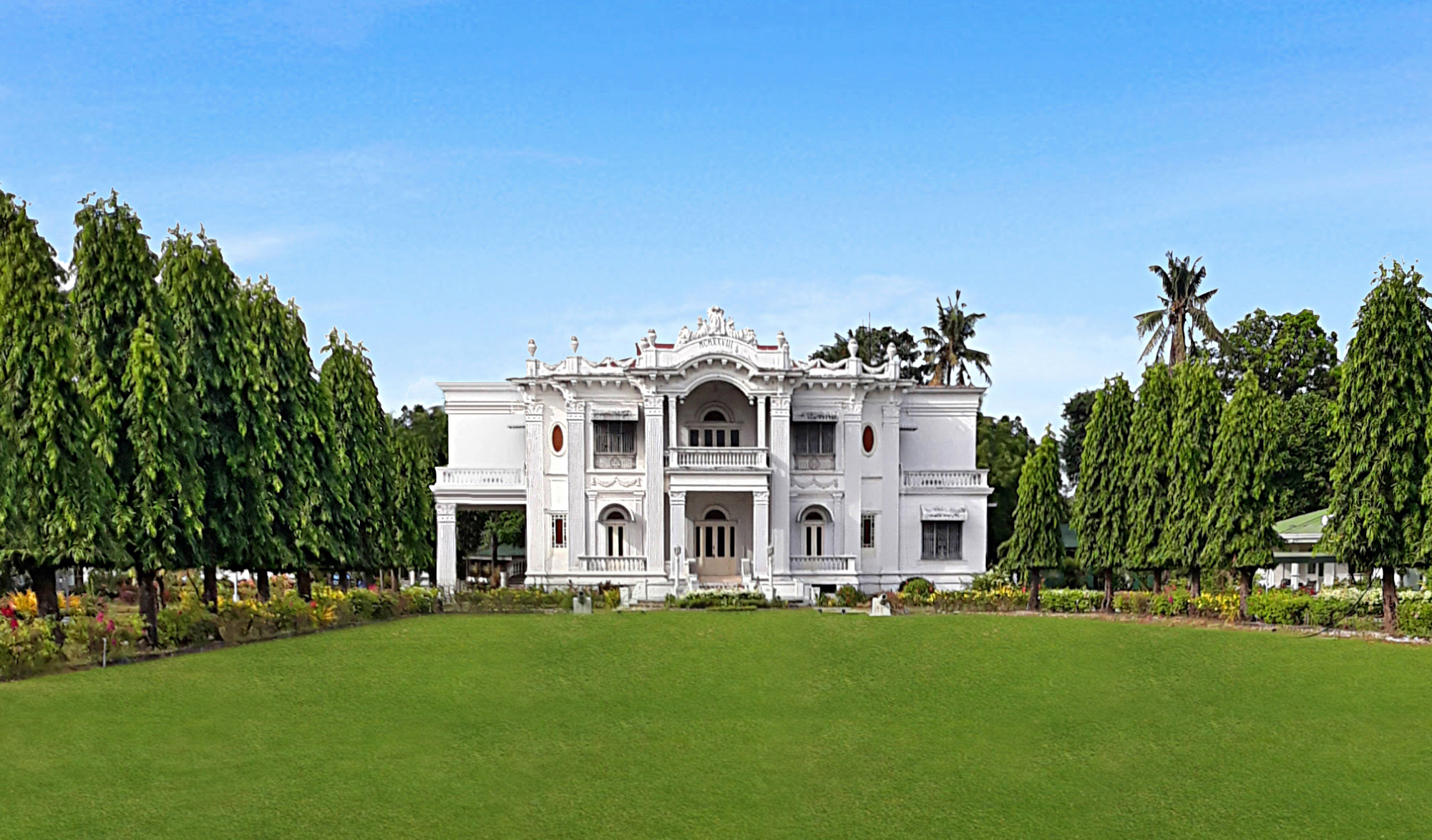
Beaux-Arts style mansion Lopez ancestral house in Jaro, Iloilo City

Ancestral houses of the Philippines, or Heritage Houses, are homes owned and preserved by the same family for several generations as part of Filipino family culture. This follows a longstanding Filipino tradition of being reverential to ancestors and elders. Houses can range in size from simple houses to mansions.

The most common houses are in the bahay na bato ("stone house") style. Some houses of prominent families have become points of interest or museums in their community because of their cultural, architectural, or historical significance. These houses are deemed of significant importance to Filipino culture and are declared Heritage Houses by the National Historical Commission of the Philippines (NHCP), previously known as the National Historical Institute (NHI) of the Philippines. Preservation is of utmost importance, as some ancestral houses have become endangered, due to business people who buy old houses in the provinces, dismantle them, then sell the parts as ancestral building materials for homeowners wishing to have the ancestral ambiance in their houses. These ancestral houses provide the current generation a look back to the country's colonial past.

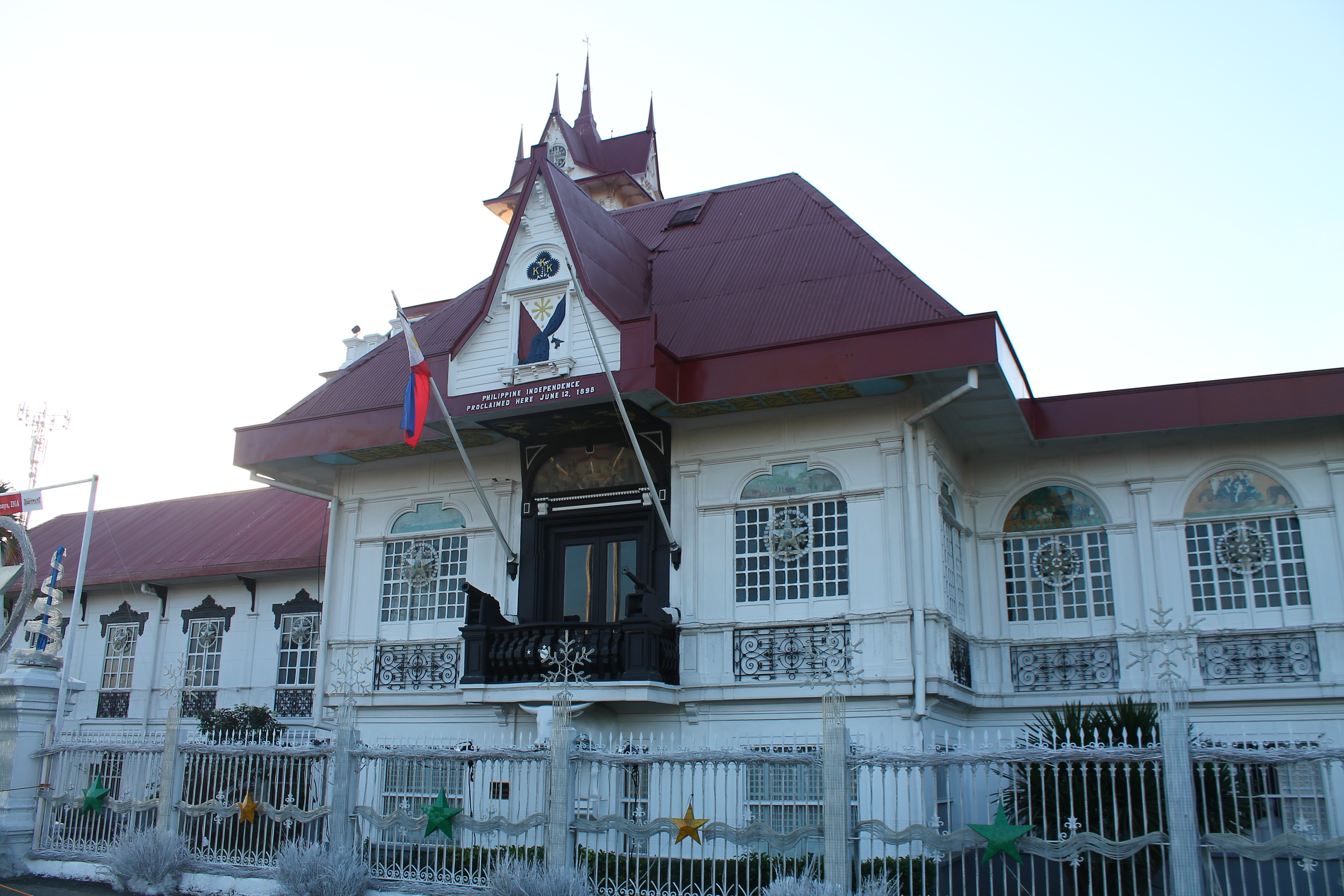
The ancestral house of Emilio Aguinaldo, declared a National Shrine in 1964

== National Cultural Heritage Act of 2009 ==
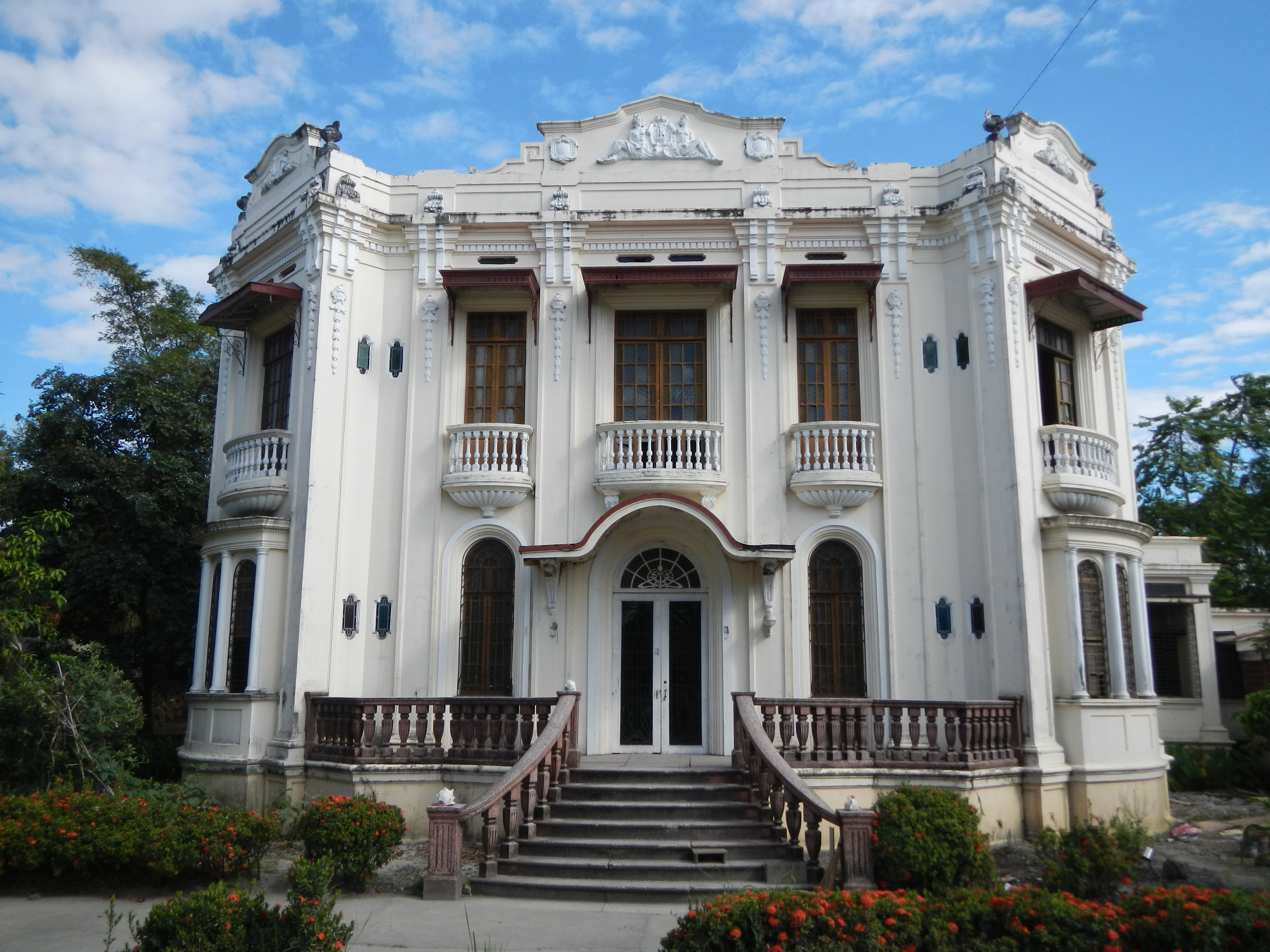
Guagua mansion

In 2009, the Congress of the Philippines passed the National Cultural Heritage Act of 2009, or Republic Act No. 10066, to strengthen the protection of the country's cultural treasures, including houses under "Built Heritage". Ancestral houses declared as Heritage Houses by the NHCP are still privately owned. The government only declares the heritage value of the structure and provides funding for its protection and preservation. Ancestral homes that have figured in historical events such as the Bonifacio Trial House in Maragondon, Cavite, or houses of national heroes of the Philippines such as the Juan Luna Shrine in Badoc, Ilocos Norte, are categorized as National Shrines or National Historical Landmarks. Historical markers are affixed to the houses by the commission to indicate their significance. The Philippine Registry of Cultural Property maintains a record of all cultural properties of the country.

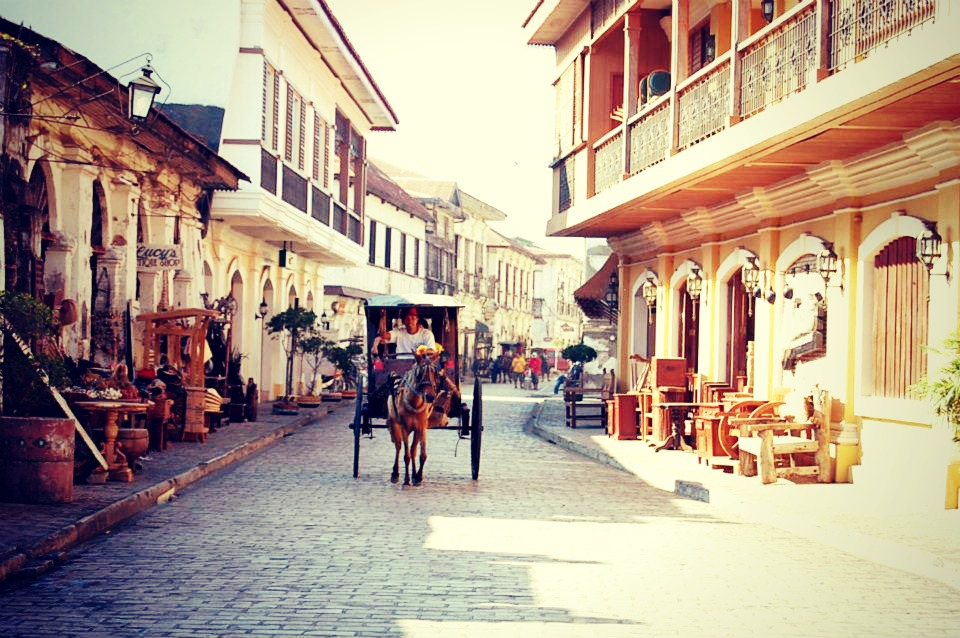
Bahay na bato ancestral houses being used for commercial purposes

== List of Heritage Houses of the Philippines ==
Here is partial list of ancestral houses declared as Heritage Houses by the NHCP, some with declaration dates, grouped regionally. Many are of bahay na bato architecture.

=== Region I ===
In the Ilocos Region, the historic city of Vigan is the best preserved Spanish colonial settlement in the country. It was declared a UNESCO World Heritage Site in 1999.

- Syquia Mansion in Vigan, Ilocos Sur, home of former president Elpidio Quirino

=== Region III ===
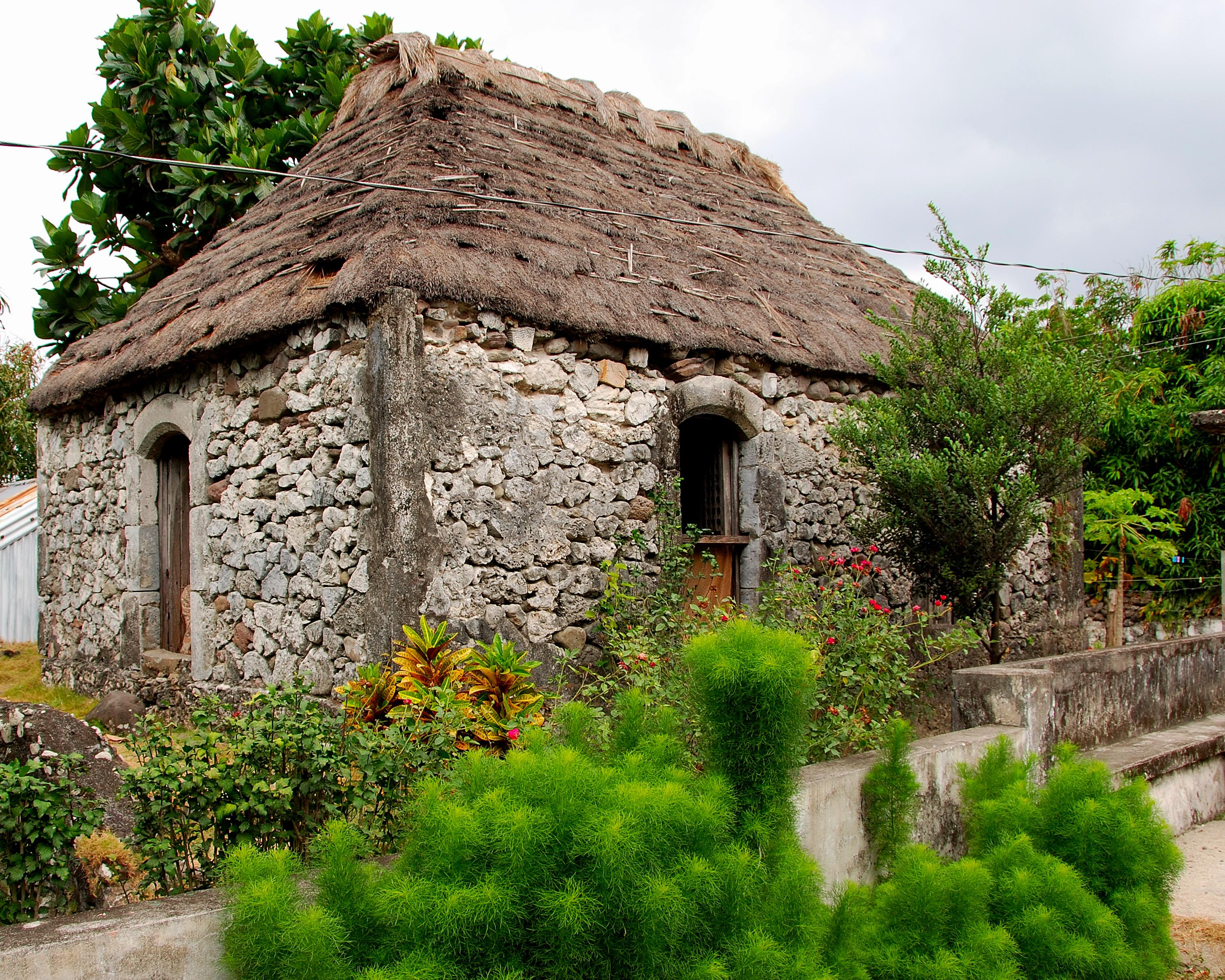
Oldest house in Batanes a Sinadumparan

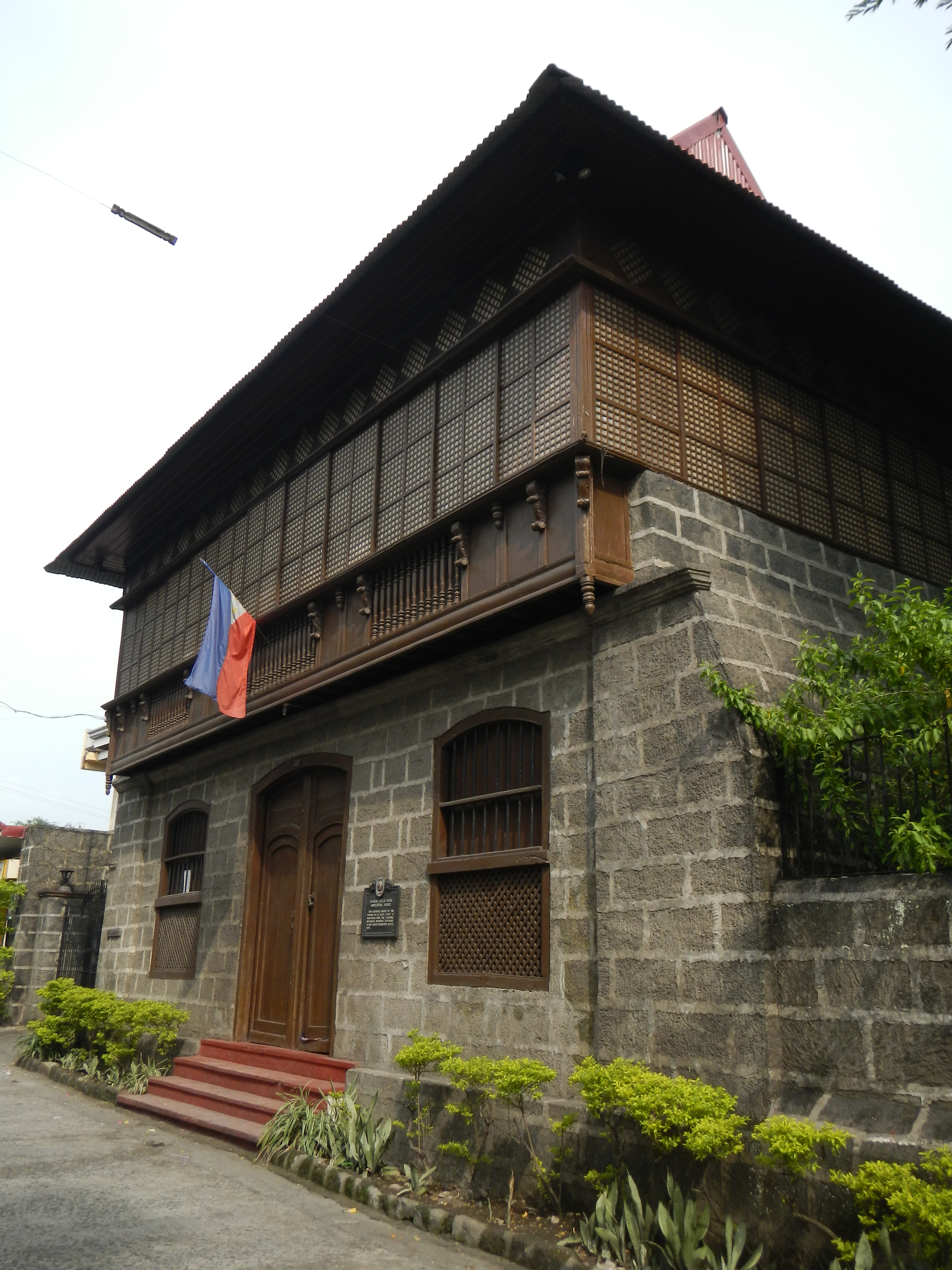
Batangas

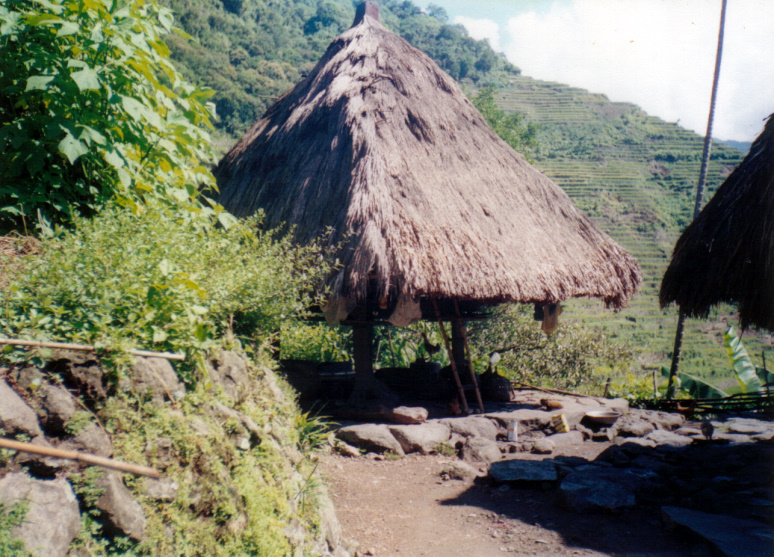
The traditional houses in Ifugao and serves as their Ancestral house

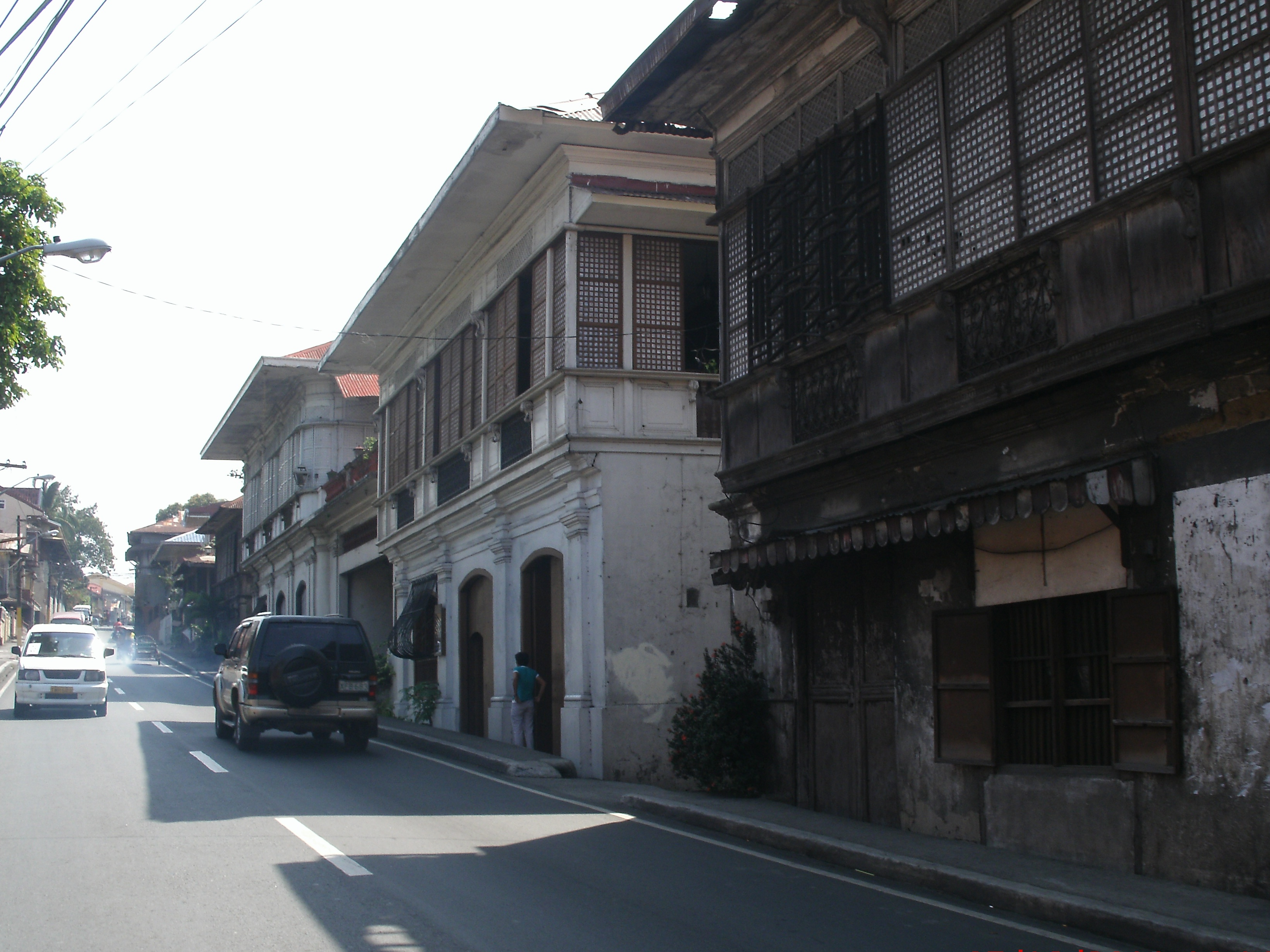
Ancestral houses in Taal, Batangas

In Central Luzon, there are two historical town centers declared by the NHCP as historic town centers: the Malolos Heritage Town in Bulacan, declared as such on August 15, 2001, and the San Fernando Heritage District in Pampanga, declared in 2004.

Malolos Heritage Town National Historical Landmark (NHL):

- Doña Alberta Uitancoy Mansion, Calle FT Reyes, Malolos, Bulacan
- Don Hermogenes Reyes Mansion, Calle FT Reyes, Malolos, Bulacan
- Gobierno Militar de la Plaza, Calle Pariancillo, Malolos, Bulacan now Meralco Malolos Office.
- Don Antonio Bautista Mansion, Calle Paseo del Congreso, Malolos, Bulacan oldest house existing in Malolos.
- Don Jose Bautista Mansion, Calle Sto Niño, Malolos, Bulacan
- Don Ramon Gonzales de Leon House, Calle Cigarillera, Malolos, Bulacan
- DR.Luis Uitangcoy Santos Mansion, Calle FT Reyes, Malolos, Bulacan
- Guillermo E.Tolentino House, Calle Sabitan, Malolos, Bulacan with NHCP marker
- Don Arcadio Ejercito Mansion, Calle Pariancillo, Malolos, Bulacan
- Don Erastro Cervantes House, also known as Secretaria de Guera, Calle Pariancillo, Malolos, Bulacan
- Don Jose Chichioco-Cojuangco Mansion, Calle Paseo del Congreso, Malolos, Bulacan with NHCP marker
- Don Fausto Chiong Mansion, Calle Pariancillo, Malolos, Bulacan
- Mariano Crisostomo, Calle Estrella, Malolos, Bulacan Don Mariano is uncle of Marcelo H.Del Pilar
- Pineda House, Calle Jarino, Malolos, Bulacan
- 1930 Lomotan-Jacinto, Calle Sto Nino, Malolos, Bulacan

San Fernando Heritage Zone

- Augusto P. Hizon House in San Fernando, Pampanga
- Dayrit-Cuyugan House in San Fernando, Pampanga (2003-01-27)
- Henson-Hizon House in San Fernando, Pampanga (2003-01-27)
- Hizon-Singian House in San Fernando, Pampanga (2003-01-27)
- Lazatin House in San Fernando, Pampanga (2003-01-27)

=== National Capital Region ===
The central part of Metro Manila was heavily bombed in World War II, which destroyed many historical structures and homes. Some pockets of old homes can still be found in Binondo and Quiapo, which were not affected by the war.

- Bahay Nakpil-Bautista in Quiapo, Manila
- Casa Consulado in Quiapo, Manila
- Lichauco Residence in Santa Ana, Manila
- Mira-Nila House in Cubao, Quezon City
- Quezon Heritage House in Quezon City

=== Region IV-A ===
In the Calabarzon region, the center for ancestral houses can be found in the streets of Taal, Balayan, and Calaca, in Batangas province, and Sariaya in Quezon province. The town center of Pila, Laguna, with its Spanish- and American-era houses, was declared a National Historical Landmark in 2000.

- Gala-Rodriguez House in Sariaya, Quezon
- Natalio Enriquez House in Sariaya, Quezon
- Don Catalino Rodriguez Ancestral House in Sariaya
- Acosta-Pastor Ancestral House in Batangas City
- Luz-Katigbak House in Lipa, Batangas
- Sarayba House in General Trias, Cavite
- Goco House in Taal, Batangas
- Ylagan-de la Rosa House in Taal, Batangas
- Bahay na Bato Oleta Family in Pililla, Rizal

=== Region IV-B ===
Declared Heritage House in Mimaropa region:

- Casa Narvas in Boac, Marinduque

=== Region V ===
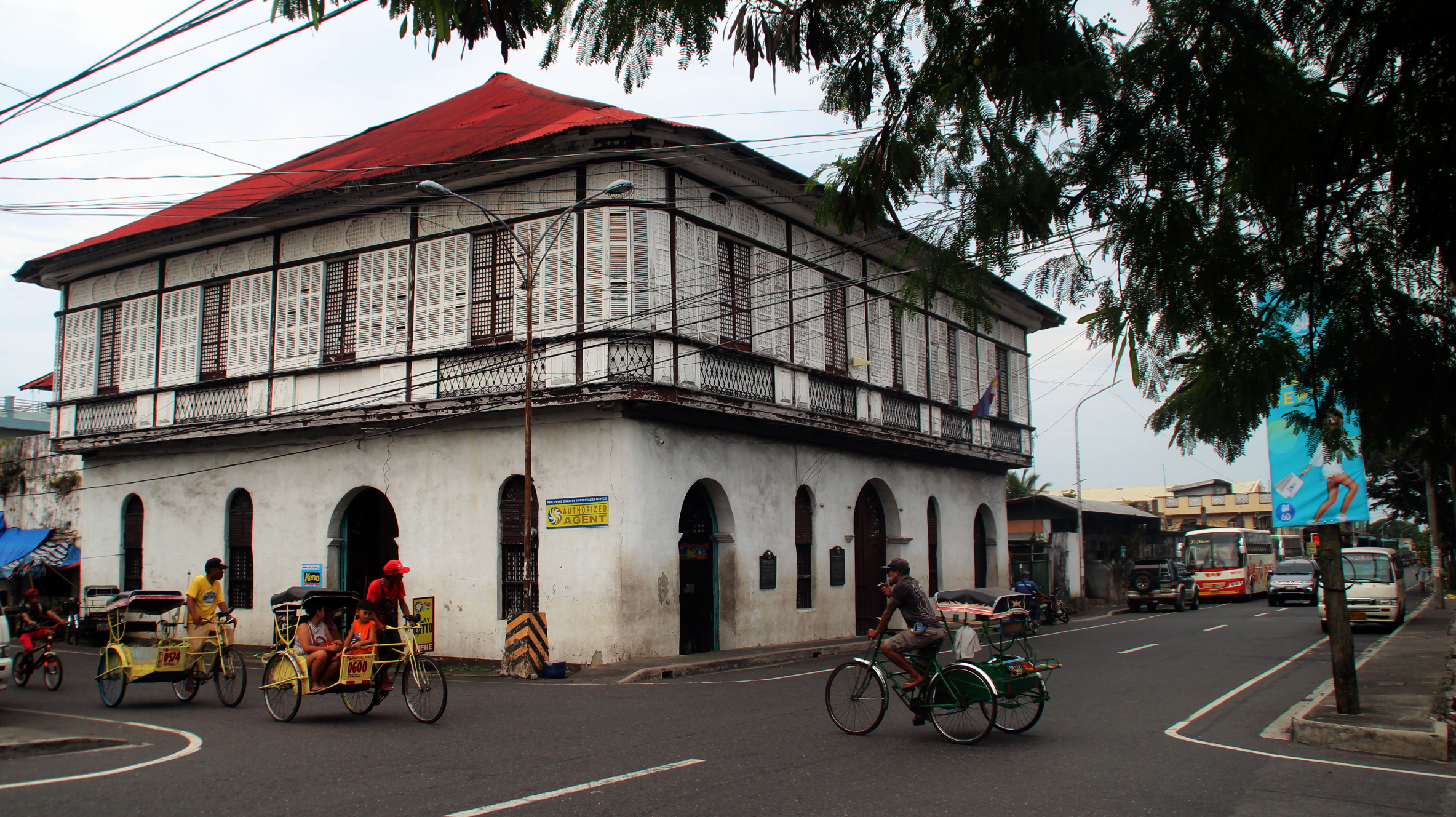
Pedicabs or pedal cabs crossing a street near Manalang Gloria Ancestral House

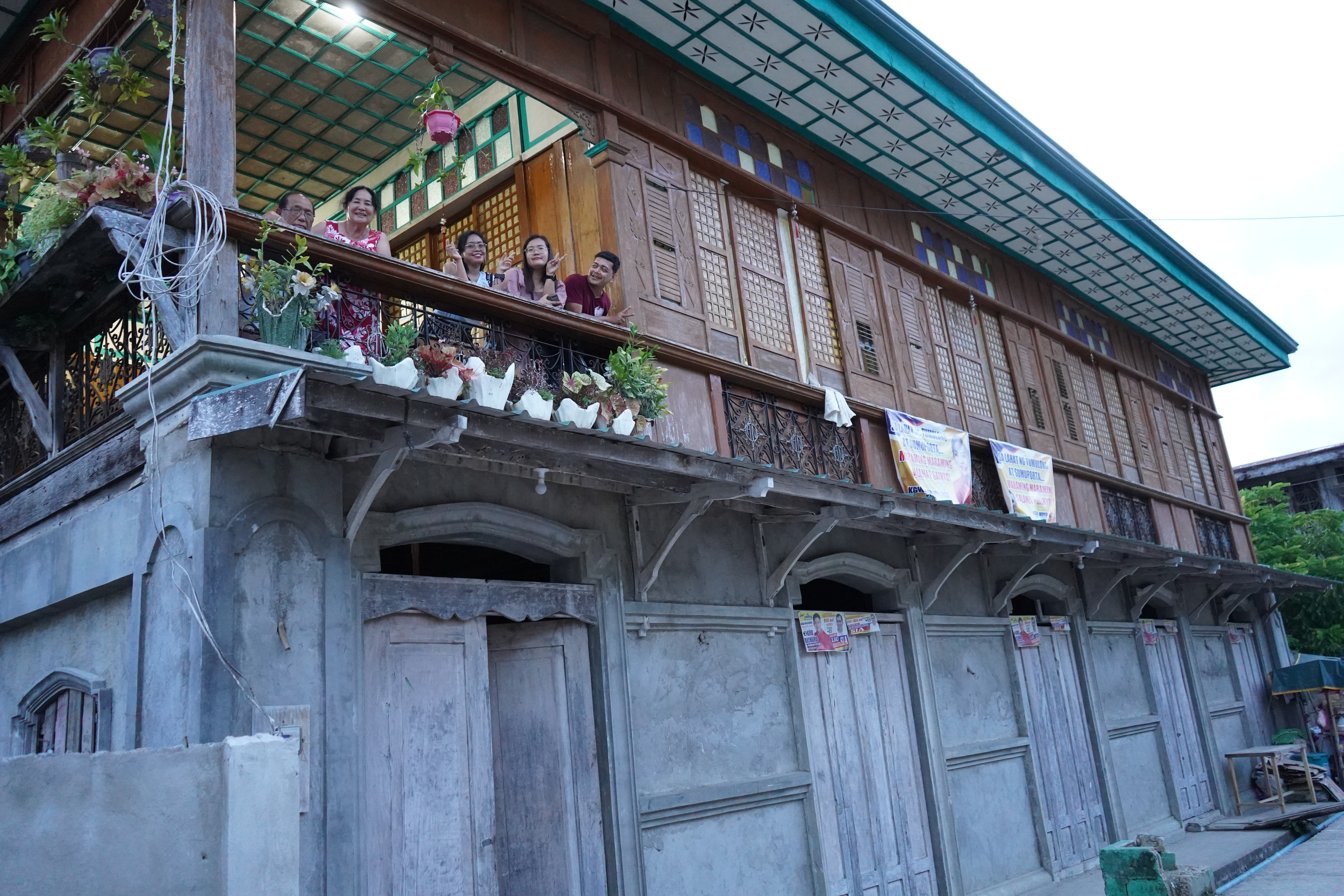
Oldest existing and the biggest house in San Pascual, Masbate

In Tabaco, Albay, the Manalang Gloria ancestral house—formerly the Smith, Bell, and Company House—is a prominent Heritage House.

In San Pascual, Masbate, the ancestral house of Lazaro family, is the oldest existing and the biggest house.

=== Region VI ===
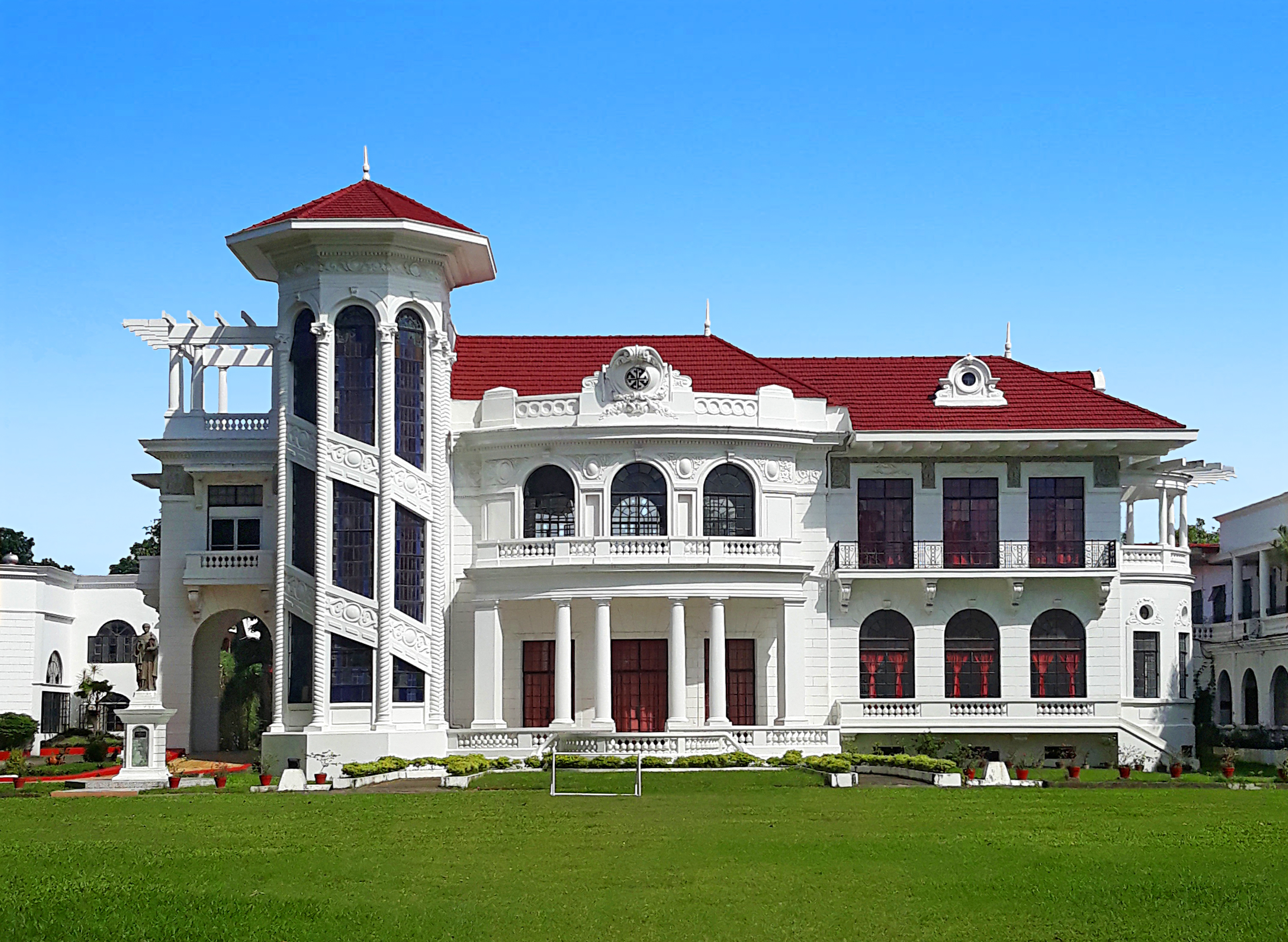
The Lizares Mansion in Jaro, Iloilo City, is one of the largest ancestral houses in the Philippines

==== Iloilo City ====
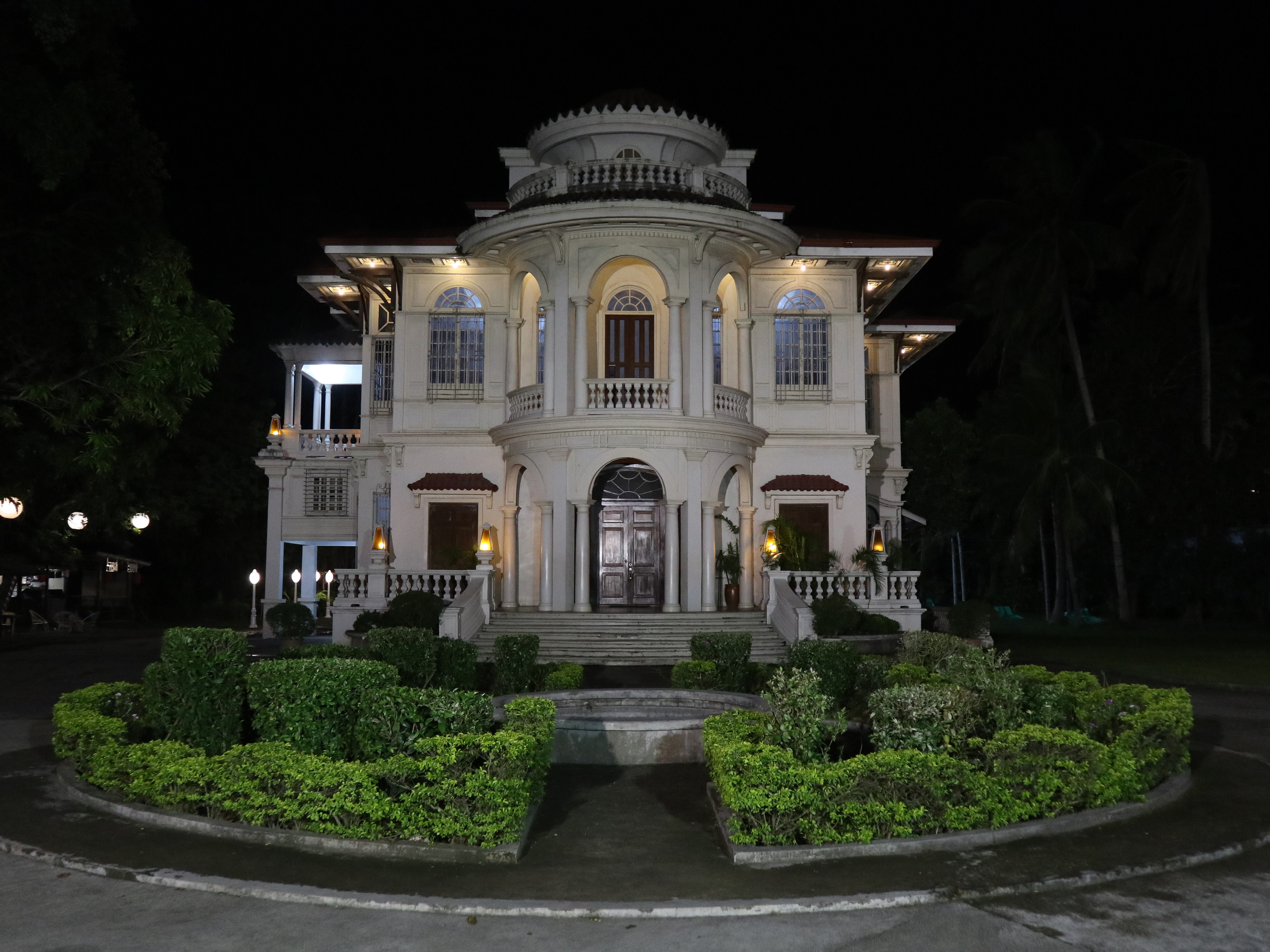
Molo Mansion in Molo, Iloilo City

Iloilo City is known as the "City of Mansions", having the most number of Heritage Mansions in the country.

- Arroyo House in Iloilo City Proper
- Camiña Balay nga Bato in Arevalo
- Casa Mariquit in Jaro
- Casa Rizaliana in Molo
- Celso Ledesma Mansion in Iloilo City Proper
- Concepcion Chalet in Jaro
- Domingo Lacson Sr. Ancestral House in Iloilo City Proper
- Don Roque Locsin Sanson Mansion in Molo
- Eusebio Villanueva Mansion, formerly known as Don Julio Ledesma House, in Iloilo City Proper
- Ledesma Mansion in Jaro
- Juan Ledesma Mansion in Iloilo City Proper
- Kilayko Mansion in Iloilo City Proper
- Lizares Mansion in Jaro
- Locsin Ancestral House in Molo
- Lopez Boat House in La Paz
- Lopez-Vito Mansion in Jaro
- Loring House in Iloilo City Proper
- Magdalena Jalandoni House in Jaro
- Mansion de Lopez (Nelly's Garden) in Jaro, considered as the "Queen of Heritage Houses in Iloilo"
- Montinola-Jaen House in Jaro
- Pison Ancestral House in Molo
- Rosendo Mejica House in Molo
- Sanson y Montinola Mansion in Jaro
- Sinamay House in Arevalo
- Lacson-Yusay/Yusay-Consing Mansion, popularly known as the Molo Mansion in Molo

==== Pototan ====
- Alberto Cordero House
- Amado Magbanua House (demolished)
- Andres Guanco House
- Apollo Cordero House (demolished)
- Candelaria Dayot House
- Federico Tirador House
- Fernando Parcon House
- Florentino Perez House
- Mariano Peñaflorida House
- Nemesio Vargas House
- Ricardo Ladrido House (demolished)

==== Roxas City ====
- Laserna House
- Pres. Manuel A. Roxas Ancestral House

=== Negros Island Region ===
==== Bacolod ====
- Generoso Villanueva House, known as "Daku Balay" (Big House), is one of the finest examples of Art Deco architecture in the Philippines from the 1930s
- Mariano Ramos Ancestral House

==== Bago ====
- General Juan Araneta Ancestral House

==== La Carlota ====
- Infante House

==== Silay ====
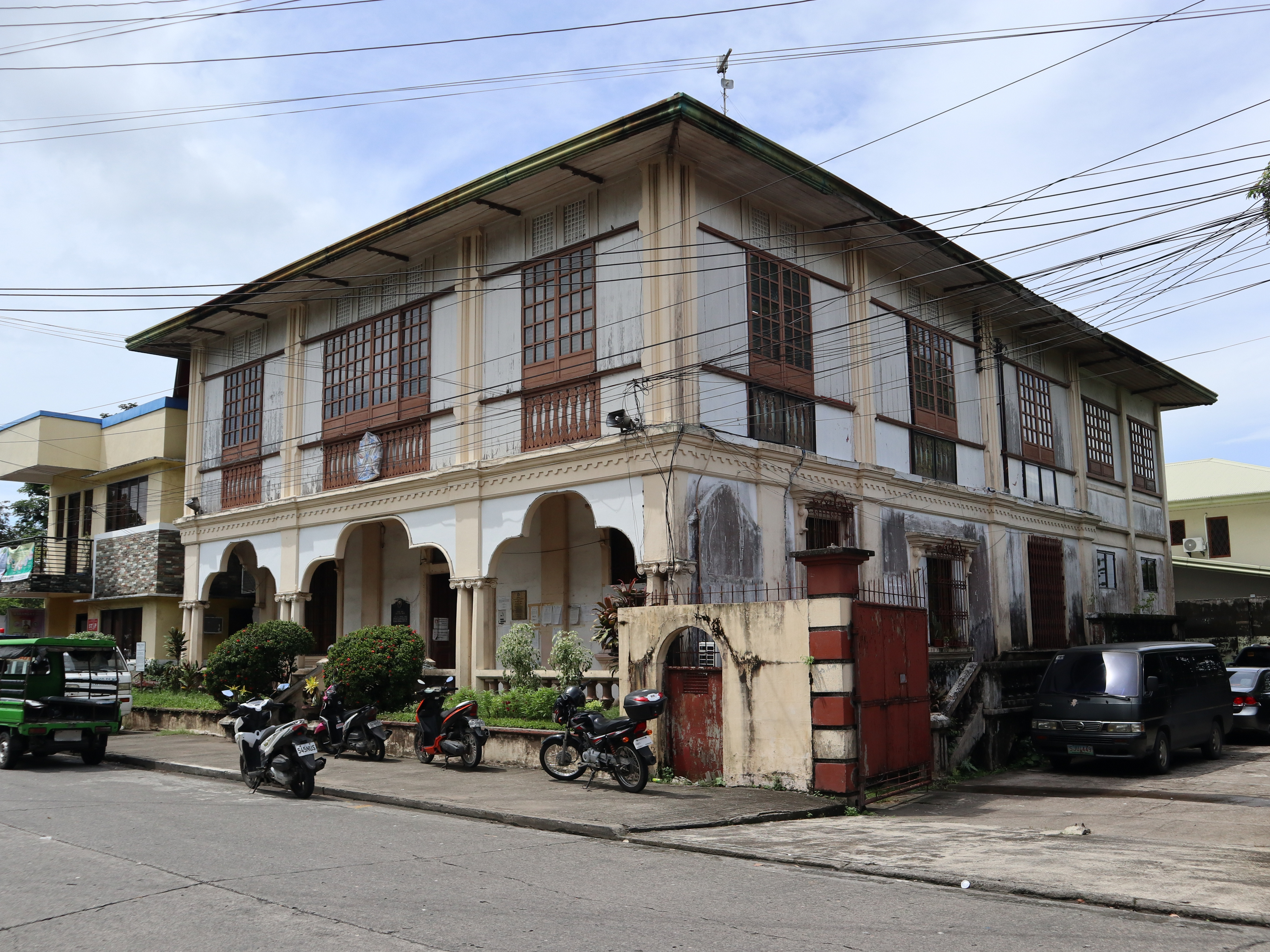
Benita Jara House

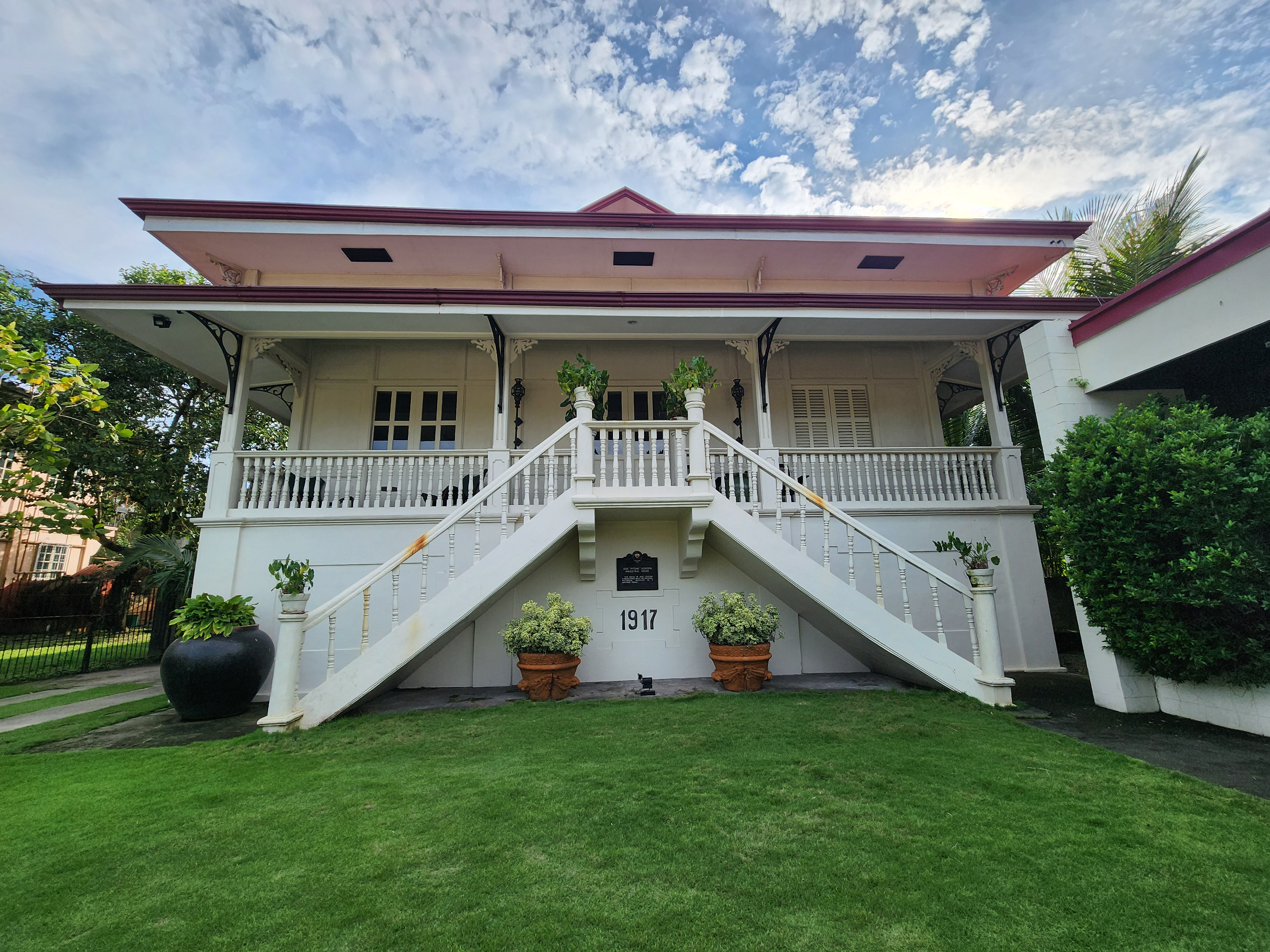
Pitong Ledesma House

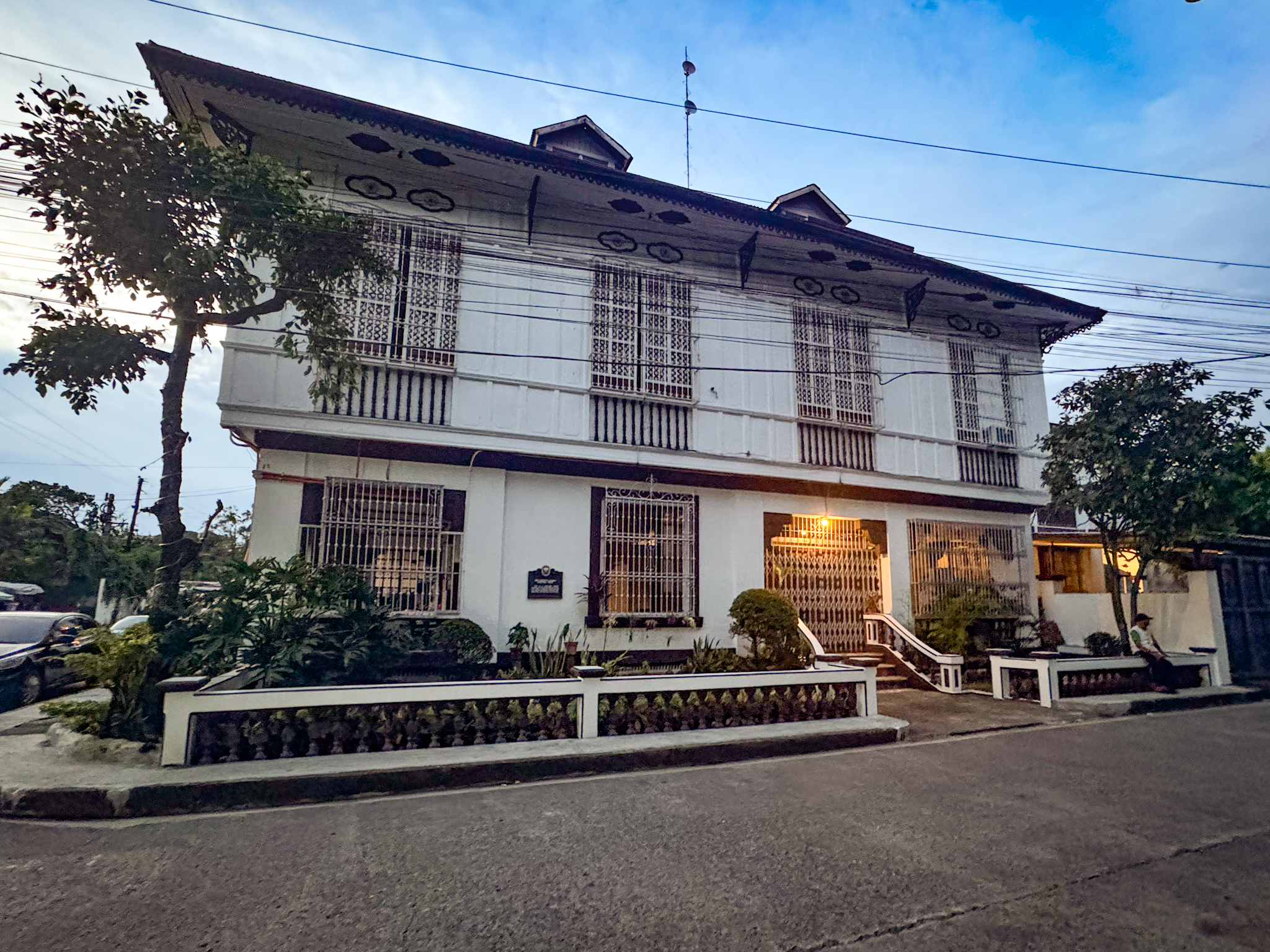
Jose Benedicto Gamboa Ancestral House

Silay in Negros Occidental has the most number of declared Heritage Houses in the country.

- Alejandro Amechazura House
- Amelia Hilado Flores House
- Angel Araneta Ledesma House
- Augusto Hilado Severino House
- Benita Jara House
- Bernardino Lopez Jalandoni Ancestral House
- Carlos Arceo Ledesma House
- Cesar Lacson Locsin House
- Claudio Hilado Akol House
- Delfin Ledesma House
- Digna Locsin Consing House
- Dr. Jose Corteza Locsin Ancestral house
- Felix Tad-y Lacson House
- Generoso Reyes Gamboa House
- German Lacson Gaston House
- German Locsin Unson House
- Jose Benedicto Gamboa House
- Jose Corteza Locsin House
- Jose Ledesma House
- Josefina T. Lacson House
- Kapitan Marciano Montelibano Lacson House
- Manuel de la Rama Locsin House
- Manuel Severino Hofileña House
- Maria Ledesma Golez House
- Modesto Ramirez Hojilla (Carlos Javelosa Jalandoni) House
- Severino Building/Heritage House
- Soledad and Maria Montelibano Lacson House
- Teodoro Morada House
- Vicente Conlu Montelibano House
- Victor Fernandez Gaston House or Balay Negrense

==== Talisay ====
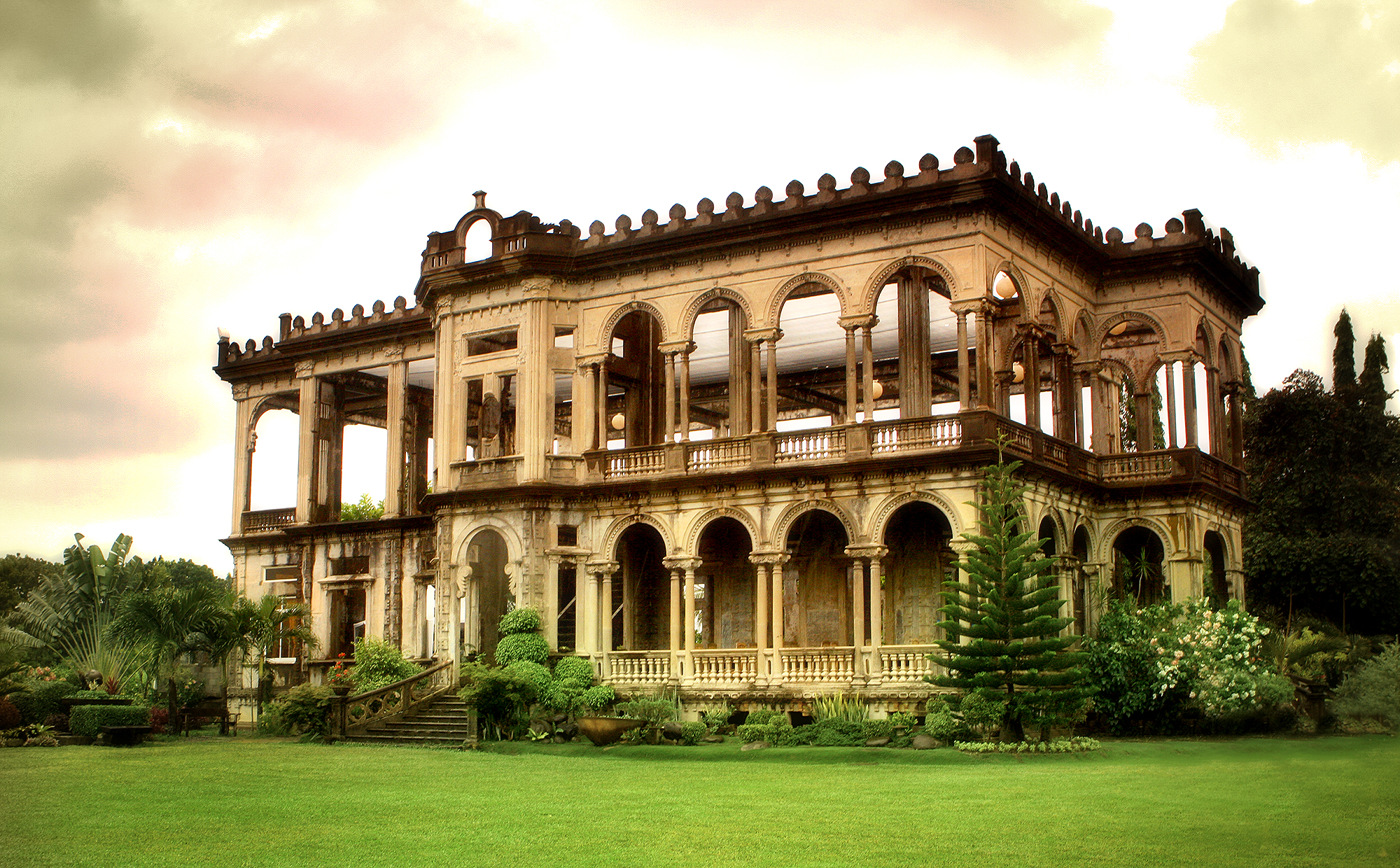
The Lacson Ruins in Talisay, Negros Occidental. One of the most iconic ancestral houses found in Region VI of Western Visayas

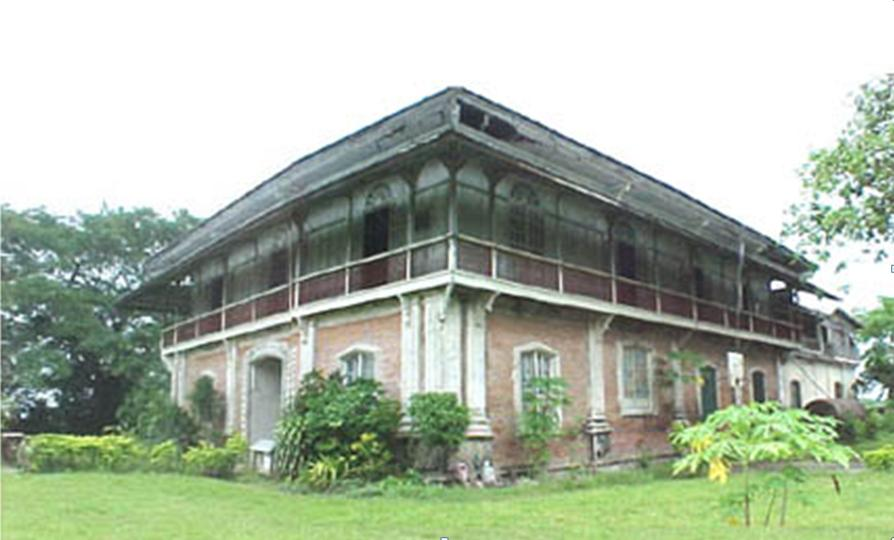
General Aniceto Lacson House, popularly known as Casa Grande

- Don Mariano Lacson Ancestral House, popularly known as "The Lacson Ruins". Inspired by Italian architecture, the mansion was built in early 1900s for his Portuguese wife. He is the brother of Domingo Lacson Sr. and General Aniceto Lacson.
- General Aniceto Lacson Ancestral House is a fine example of a bahay-na-bato built in the 1880s. Its balcony has a panoramic view of the surrounding hacienda, and the house has its own chapel at ground level. He is the brother of Domingo Lacson Sr. and Don Mariano Lacson.
- Tana Dicang House.

=== Region VII ===
Heritage Houses in Central Visayas region:

- Don Vicente H. Garces Ancestral House in Talisay City, Cebu
- Balay na Tisa Heritage House in Carcar, Cebu
- Clarin Ancestral House in Loay, Bohol
- Mercado Mansion in Carcar, Cebu
- President Carlos P. Garcia Heritage House in Tagbilaran, Bohol
- Sa Dakong Balay / Don Florencio Noel House in Carcar, Cebu
- Yap-San Diego House in Cebu City (Constructed 1675)
- Silva House in Carcar, Cebu
- German Ferraren y Geronimo Ancestral House in Ginatilan, Cebu
- Ferolin Ancestral House in Ginatilan, Cebu

=== Region VIII ===
Heritage Houses in the Eastern Visayas region:

- Oppus Ancestral House now the Southern Leyte Provincial Library in Maasin, Southern Leyte

=== Region X ===
Heritage Houses in the Northern Mindanao region:

- Macapagal-Macaraeg House in Iligan, Lanao del Norte

== National Shrines and National Historical Landmarks ==
Partial list of ancestral houses declared as National Shrine or National Historical Landmark by the NHCP:

- Aguinaldo Shrine in Kawit, Cavite
- Apolinario Mabini Shine in Tanuan, Batangas
- Apolinario Mabini Shrine in Pandacan, Manila
- Aquino Ancestral House Historical Landmark in Concepcion, Tarlac
- Baldomero Aguinaldo Shrine in Binakayan, Kawit, Cavite
- Juan Luna Shrine in Badoc, Ilocos Norte
- Marcela Agoncillo Historical Landmark in Taal, Batangas
- Marcelo H. del Pilar Shrine in Bulakan, Bulacan
- Rizal Shrine, Calamba, Laguna
- Rizal Shrine in Dapitan, Zamboanga del Norte
- Santa Barbara Church and Convent in Santa Barbara, Iloilo

== Other ancestral houses ==
- Consunji House in San Fernando, Pampanga
- Quema House in Vigan, Ilocos Sur
- Tabacalera House in San Fernando, Pampanga
- Atega Ancestral House in Cabadbran, Agusan del Norte
- Casa Villavicencio and the Wedding Gift House in Taal, Batangas
- Casa Bernedo in Dipolog, Zamboanga del Norte
- Fule- Malvar Mansion in San Pablo, Laguna
- Jusay Ancestral House
