= Casa Consulado (Quiapo) =

Heritage house in Manila, Philippines

- Interactive map of the Casa Consulado area
- Alternative names: Iturralde House; Iturralde Mansion; Iturralde-Consulado House

General information
- Type: House
- Architectural style: Bahay na Bato
- Location: Quiapo, 730 San Sebastian St., Quiapo, Manila, Philippines
- Coordinates: 14°36′00″N 120°59′19″E
- Current tenants: Iturralde
- Construction started: 1926
- Owner: House of Iturralde
- Landlord: Paul Rannier Iturralde

Height
- Architectural: Bandehado Type Bahay na Bato

Technical details
- Material: Stones, Bricks, and Wood
- Floor count: Two
- Floor area: 400sq meters

Other information
- Number of rooms: 4

The Casa Consulado, also known as Iturralde Mansion or Iturralde House, is a heritage house located in Quiapo, Manila, Philippines. The house typifies the architectural style of Bandehadong Bahay na Bato that was common during the 1920s in the Philippines.

== History ==
=== The former Consulate of Monaco in the Philippines ===
The house was constructed in the 1926 in a lot previously owned by Don Mariano Garchitorena following the Bandehado style of Bahay na Bato. In 1936 the house was acquired by the family of Don Jose Iturralde and his wife Doña Dominga Alvaro. Their son, Dr. Augusto Alvaro Iturralde, was appointed as Honorary Consul of the Principality of Monaco to the Philippines, and converted the house as his office and as the Consulate House of Monaco in the Philippines.

== See also ==
- Ancestral houses of the Philippines
