= Consunji House =

Heritage house in Pampanga, Philippines

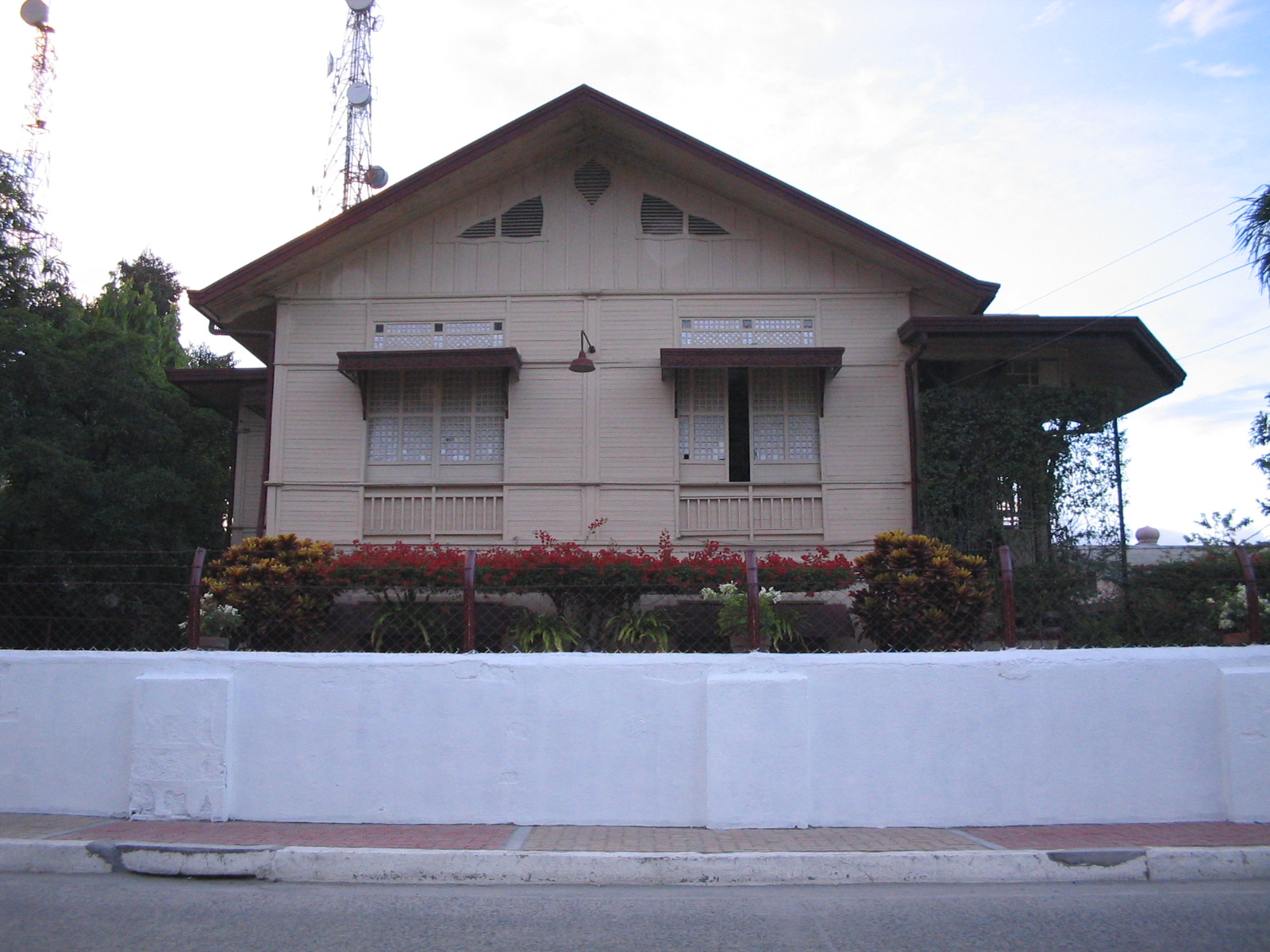
Consunji House

The Consunji House is a heritage house in the City of San Fernando, Pampanga province in the Philippines.

== History ==
The house was the residence of Antonio E. Consunji, the gobernadorcillo of San Fernando in 1892. He was removed from office by the ruling Spanish government because of his attendance when Jose P. Rizal visited the town in June of that year. He became the presidente municipal of San Fernando during the Philippine Revolution from 1898 to 1899.

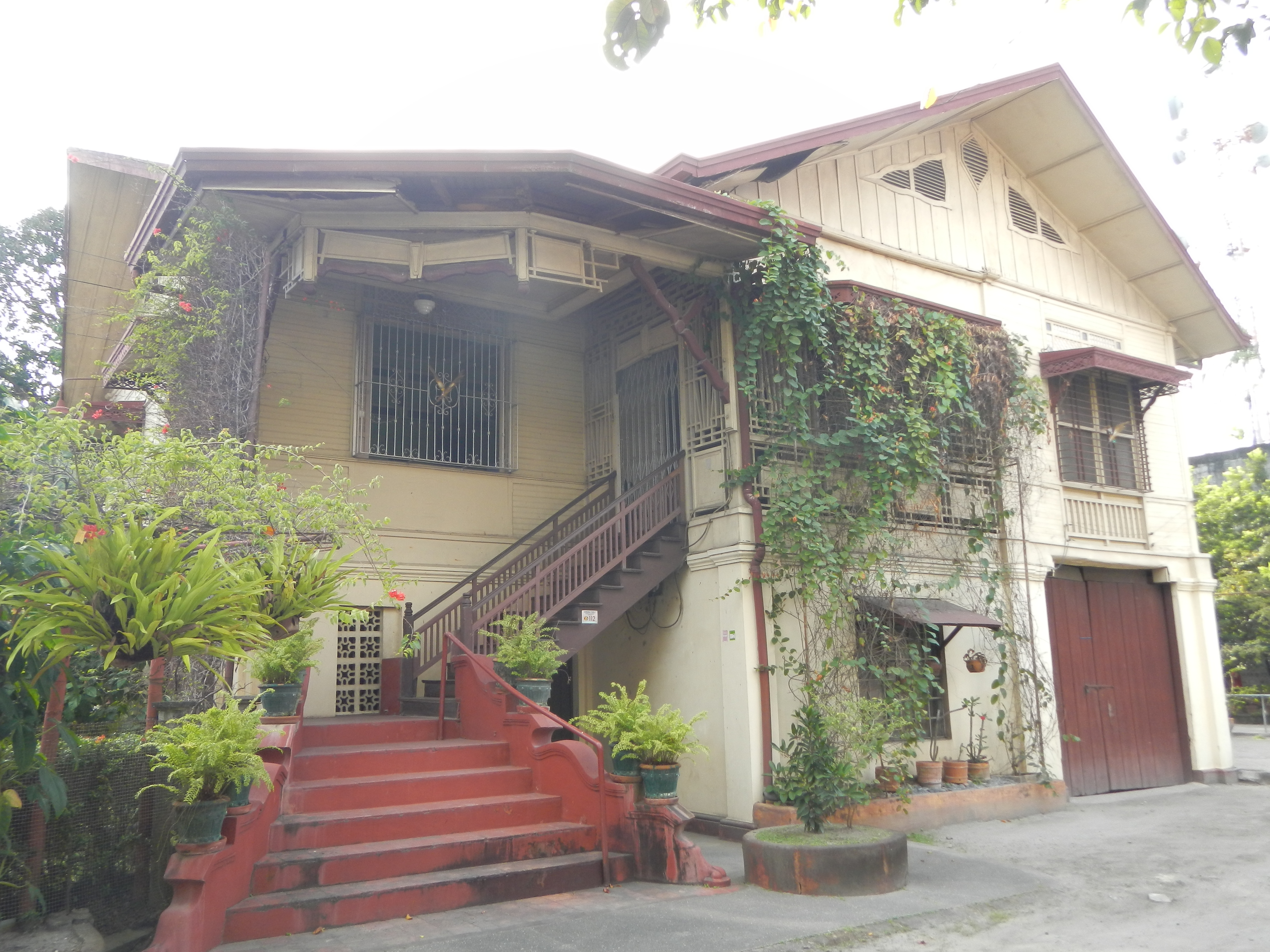
Façade of the Antonio E. Consunji heritage house

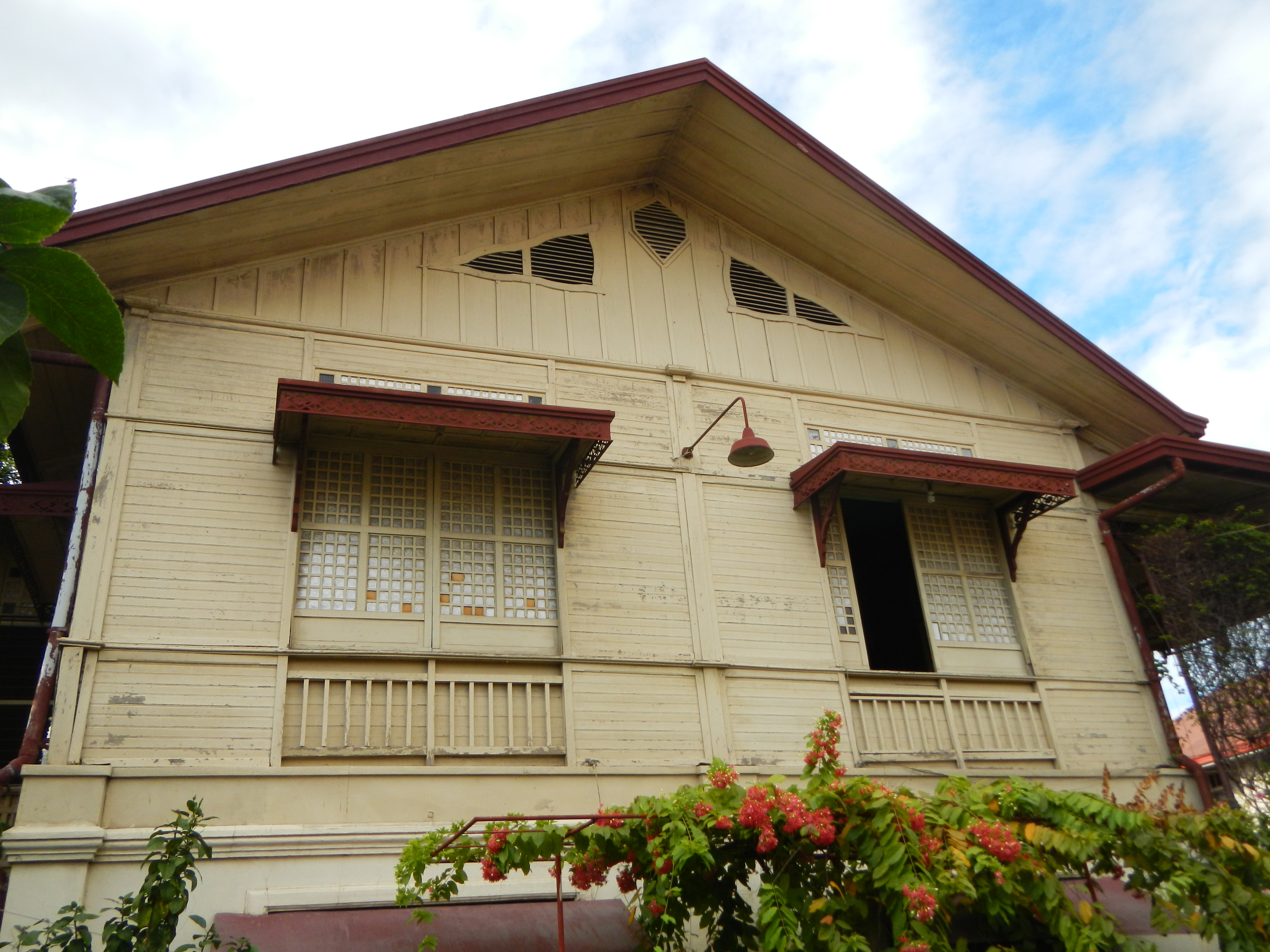
House frontage

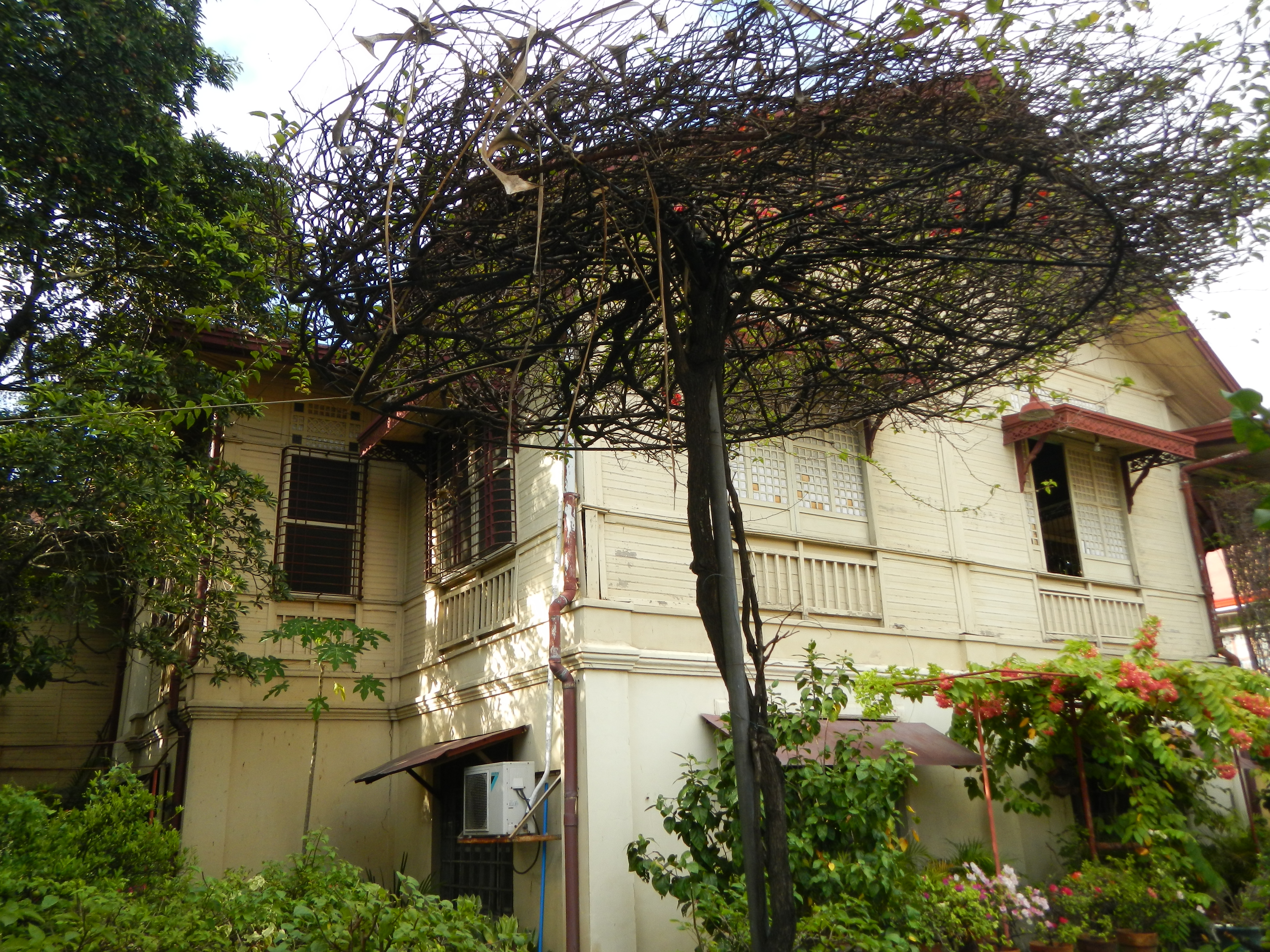
Front and left side of the mansion

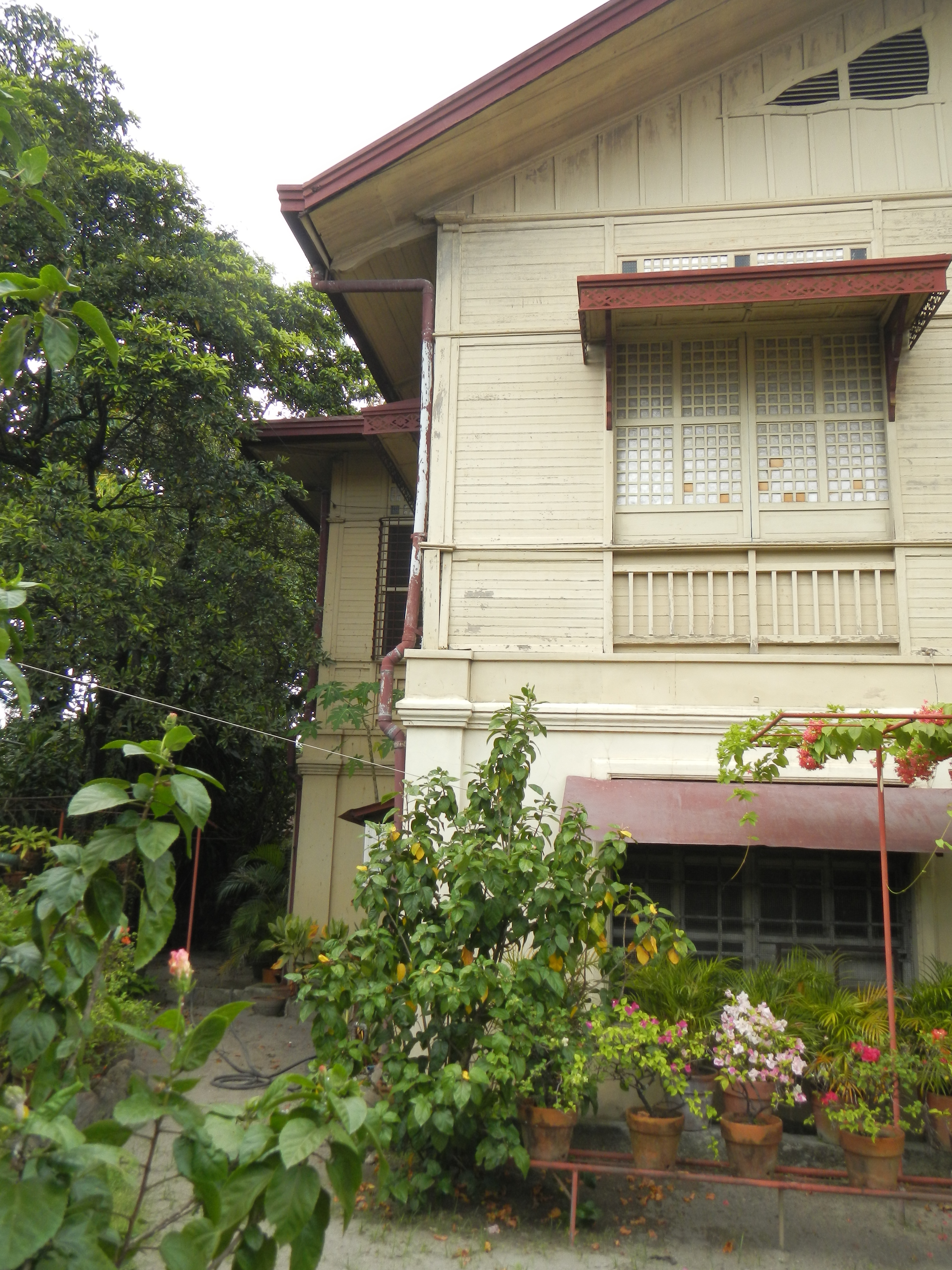
A view from the fence, the left side of the house
