= Dayrit–Cuyugan House =

Coordinates: 15.0363°N 120.6844°E

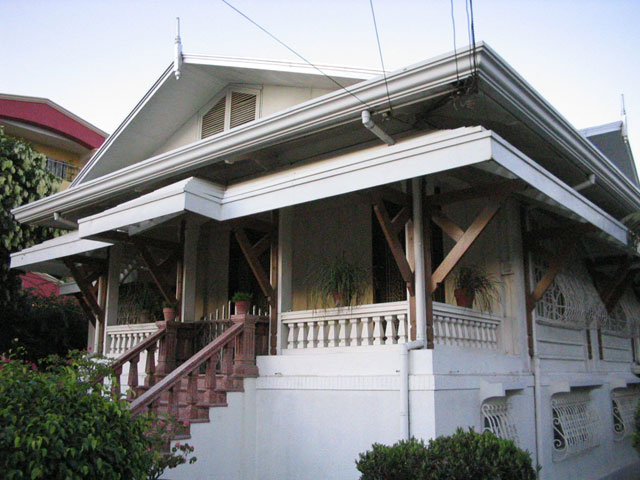
Dayrit-Cuyugan House

The Dayrit-Cuyugan House is a Bahay na Bato heritage house in the City of San Fernando, in the province of Pampanga, Philippines. This ancestral house, which exemplifies the architecture prevalent during the American colonial period was declared a Heritage House by the National Historical Institute on 27 January 2003 by virtue of Resolution No. 5, S. 2003.

== History ==
The Dayrit-Cuyugan House was built in 1920 by the couple Joaquin Dayrit y Singian, a sugar farmer, and Maria Paz Cuyugan y de Leon. It was inherited by their eldest daughter Luz Dayrit y Cuyugan who was married to Ulderico Rodriguez from Bacolor, Pampanga.
