= Yap–San Diego House =

Yap-San Diego House
- Balay nga Bato ug Kahoy
- Yap-San Diego Ancestral House in 2026

General information
- Type: Residential house and museum
- Location: Mabini St, Cebu City, Philippines
- Coordinates: 10.29927°N 123.90394°E
- Owner: Yap-San Diego Family

Technical details
- Material: Coral stone and wood
- Floor count: 2

The Yap-San Diego House is a heritage house located in Cebu City, Philippines. It is considered to be among the oldest surviving Chinese houses outside of China. It is also among the oldest residential structures in the Philippines.

== History ==
Cebu City Cultural and Historical Affairs Commission Marker

The house is estimated to have been built sometime between 1675 and 1700 by Don Juan Yap, a Chinese merchant from Fujian, China, together with his wife Doña Maria Florido. It is located in the historical Parián in Cebu City where Chinese were required to live during the Philippines' Spanish colonial era.

The house is protected by the National Historical Commission of the Philippines and was opened to the public in 2008. Today, the house continues to be maintained by the original family's descendant Val Mancao San Diego.

== Features ==
The house is a two-storey structure constructed out of coral stone and wood. It follows the Bahay na bato Philippine architectural style seen among wealthier residents during the Spanish colonial era. There is an open-air garden on the first level, windows on the second level, and a downward sloping roof. A variety of historical artifacts are displayed inside.
