= Angel Araneta Ledesma Ancestral House =

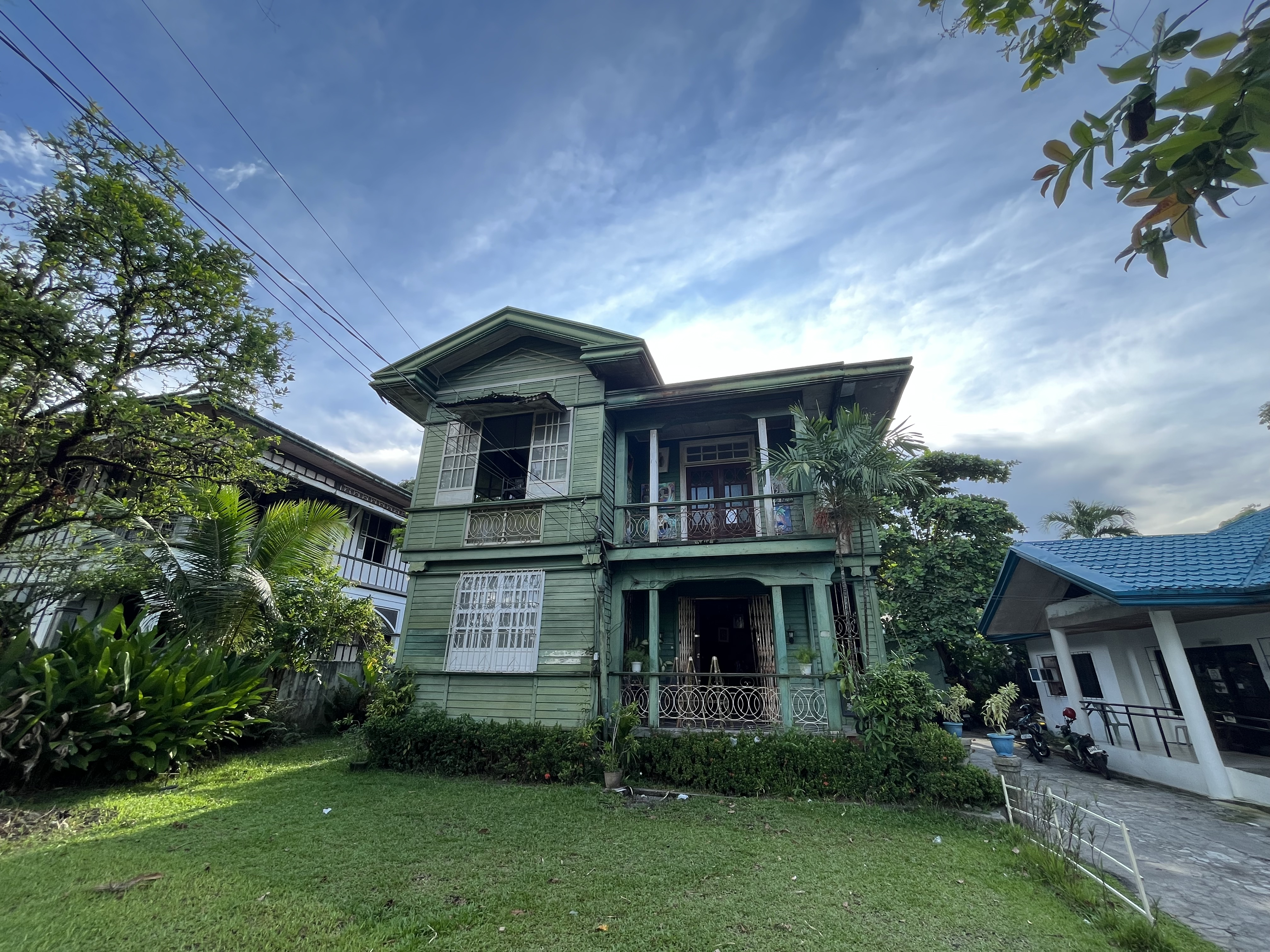
- Facade of the Angel Ledesma Heritage House

- Location within Philippines
- Alternative names: Balay Verde

General information
- Status: Completed
- Architectural style: American clapboard-Colonial plantation combination
- Location: Plaridel Street, Silay, Negros Occidental, Philippines
- Coordinates: 10.801491°N 122.974821°E
- Owner: Silay city government

The Angel Araneta Ledesma Ancestral House is one of the heritage houses in Silay City, Negros Occidental, Philippines belonging to Angel Araneta Ledesma and his wife Rizalina Javelona Lopez. Also known as Balay Verde (lit. 'Green House'), it is strategically located along Plaridel Street, near the Silay City Hall, the San Diego Pro-cathedral, Police Department, and the Puericulture Center.

== History and architecture ==
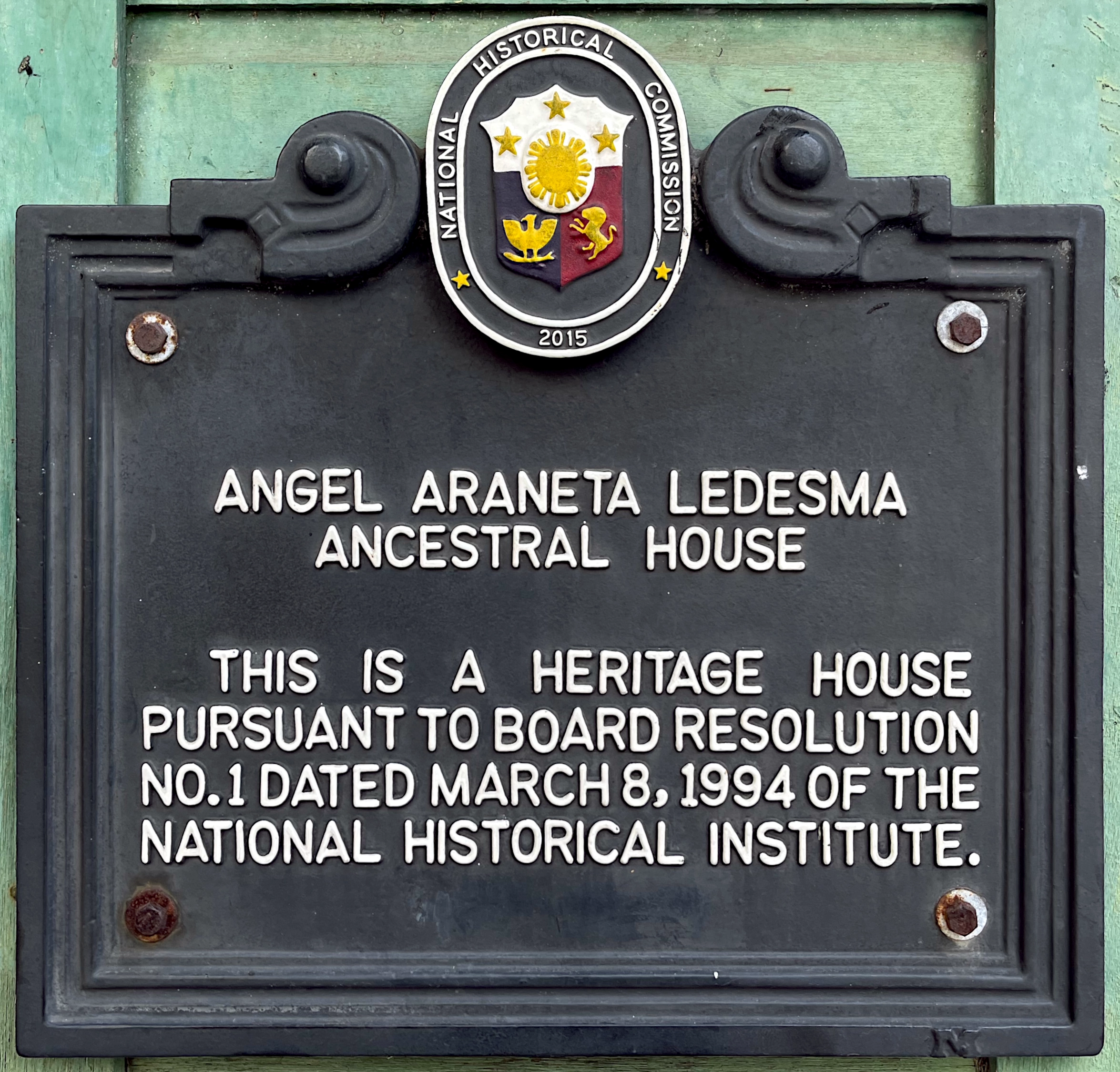
National historical marker installed in 2015

The Angel Araneta Ledesma Ancestral House was built in 1933 using the logs that were available in the lumber yard business of Angel Ledesma. The two-story house combines the Colonial Plantation architecture and the American clapboard style that was popular in the Revivalist era of the American period.

In 1992, the family sold the house to an individual, who later sold it to the government of Silay. Eventually, it houses the Office of Culture, Arts and Tourism of the City of Silay.

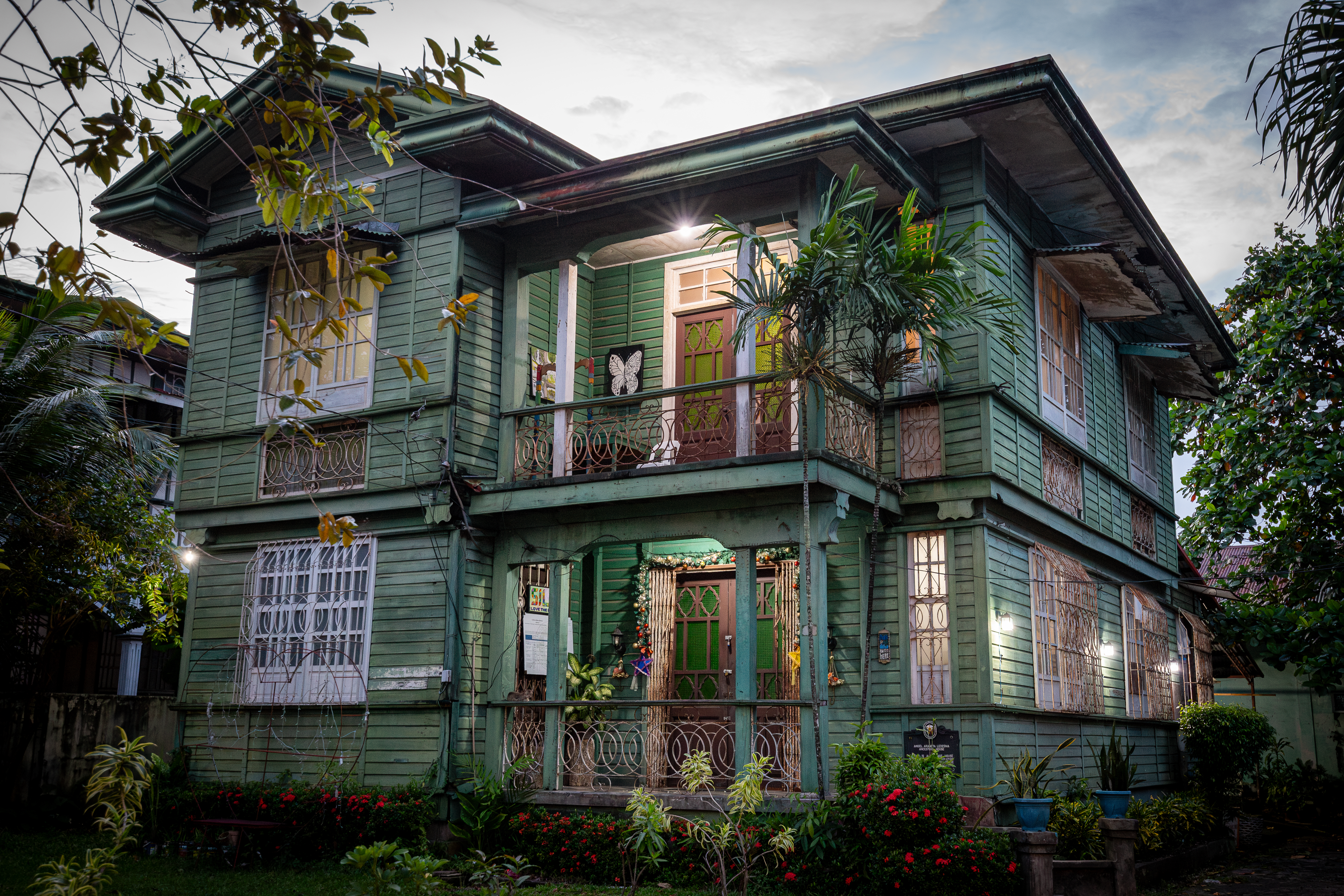
2024 photo of the Angel Araneta Ledesma Ancestral House
