= Villavicencio–Marella House =

Villavicencio-Marella House
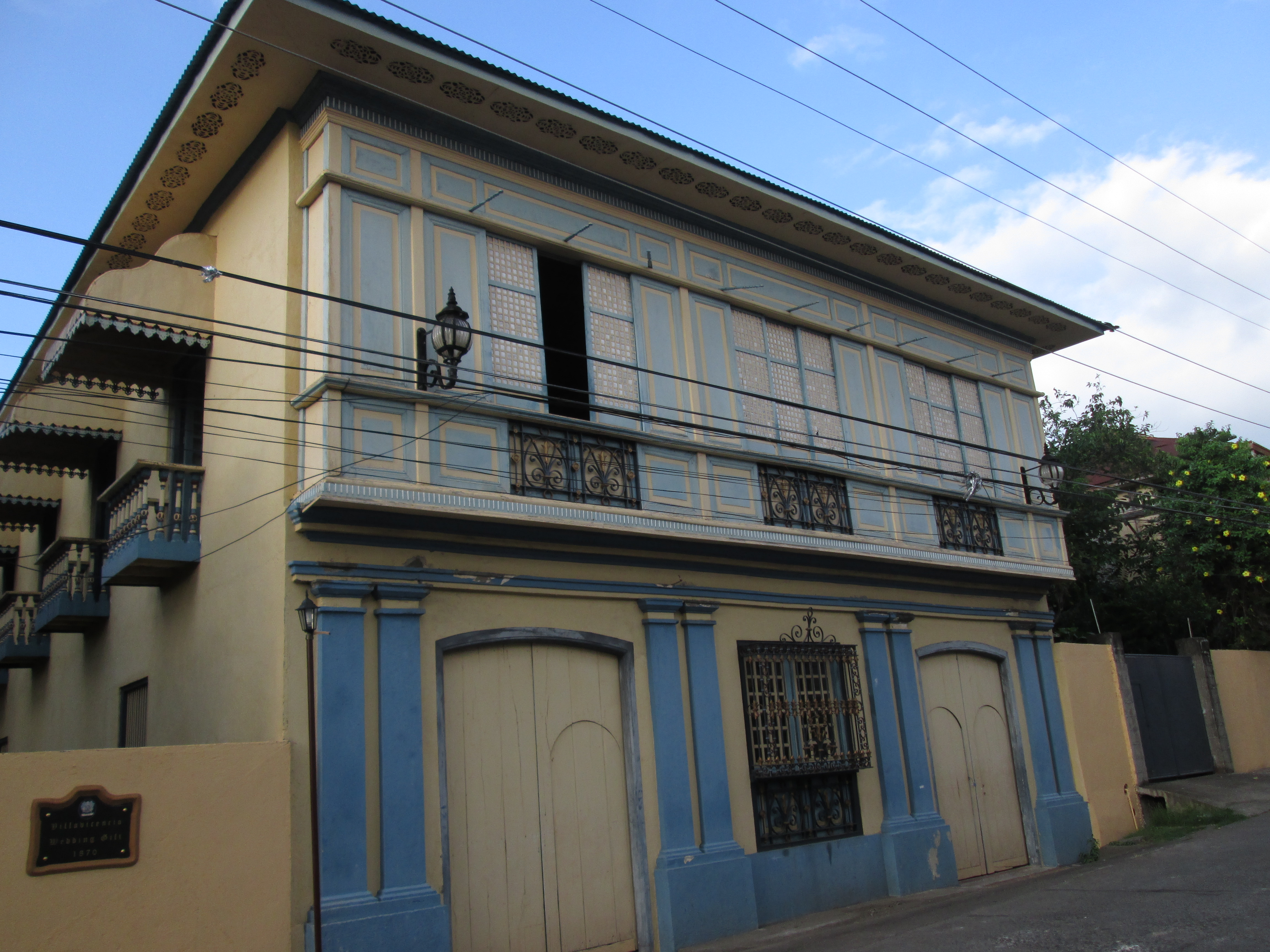
- The facade of Villavicencio-Marella House
- Interactive map of the Villavicencio-Marella House area

General information
- Type: Museum and Residence
- Architectural style: Bahay na Bato
- Location: Gliceria Marella Street, Taal, Batangas, Taal, Philippines
- Coordinates: 13.880376°N 120.921430°E
- Owner: Joven-Villavicencio Family

Technical details
- Material: Adobe, and Wood

The Villavicencio-Marella House or Wedding Gift House is an old Spanish Colonial Era house in Taal, Batangas, Philippines. The house was the wedding gift present of Don Eulalio Villavicencio to his wife Doña Gliceria Marella y Legaspi on the occasion of their wedding in 1871.

== History ==
=== Early years ===
The house was built in 1870 and was presented to Doña Gliceria Marella y Legaspi on the occasion of their marriage in 1871. Hence it came to be called The Wedding Gift House.The couple lived in the house until the death of Don Eulalio's parents who left him the adjoining house. Since it was bigger, the couple moved over to the older house to accommodate their growing family.

The Wedding Gift House then served as a guest house. The Luna brothers stayed there in January 1892 while soliciting contributions throughout Batangas for the Propaganda Movement. The Villavicencio couple donated P18,000 to the cause. In gratitude, Juan Luna gifted the couple with their portraits, which were subsequently framed in beautifully carved and gilded frames by Isabelo Tampinco.

The house later went to Don Jose Villavicencio, Don Eulalio's son. He lived in the house along with his wife until he demised in the 1980s. The house was later occupied by one of his wards who converted it into apartments. For a while, the house became a toy factory.

=== Later years and restoration ===
Although the house was lived in by Don Jose Villavicencio, Doña Gliceria's son, until his death in the 1980s, no major repair was done on the house during his occupancy, except for the time of his death; the original hand-painted canvas walls had faded by then, with any traces of the original paintings.

When the rooms of the house was converted into apartments after his death, the house became derelict. Leaks in the roof had rotten some of the floorboards and many post had sunk due to wood rot. The dining-room floor had sagged so dangerously at one end that the room could not be used. By 1990, the house had fallen into disrepair and only half of it was habitable.

In the communal partition, the house went to the heirs of Doña Vicenta Villavicencio de Villavicencio, Glirecia's eldest daughter. Monserrat Villavicencio Joven, Vicenta's eldest child, inherited the house. It was only then the house was restored by Jocelyn Villavicencio Joven, daughter of Monserrat Villavicencio Joven, along with her husband Adviculo Cuay Quiblat. The sagging and leaking roof was repaired, the post was jacked up and reinforced, and the rotten floorboards replaced. With the help of Martin I. Tinio Jr., the walls of the upper floor were painted in the style of the 1870s, using colors typical of that period. The garden was landscaped with plants mentioned in the third edition of Fr. Blanco's book Flora de Filipinas. A gazebo in the 1890s style was built in the garden. The process took six years, and the house is now a delight to see.

== Architecture and style ==
The house is a three-bayed bahay na bato. The walls of the entire house, including the second floor except the front, are built of adobe blocks. A wooden volada on the second floor fronting the street is walled with carved molave panels and wall-to-wall sliding capiz windows topped by multi-lobed exterior transoms, also of capiz. Above the upper window sills are decorative slats, where Japanese lanterns were hung during processions. Ventanillas or "little windows" beneath the window sills are faced with iron grillwork wrought in the palmette motif with cast-lead ornamentation typical of the 1870s. The neo-Gothic ogee arches are carved on the main double doors replicated those in the older Villavicencio House.

The house is unusual because the town main double doors of the zaguan are built on either side of the a central bay sporting a large decorative wrought-iron grills with a palmatte motif decorated with cast-lead ornaments. The left door led to that part of the zaguan where the carriage was kept when not in use. A door on the left opened to the central garden with a tone stairway at the end leading up to the azotea. The caballeriza or stable was located under the azotea. The left zaguan door also serve as a tradesman's entrance to the large and spacious concerns of the Villavicencio's. French doors on the street side let light in while sliding capiz windows on either side of the entresuelo ensured good cross-ventilation.

== See also ==
- Taal, Batangas
