= Tabacalera House =

Heritage house in Pampanga, Philippines

Coordinates: 15°01′34″N 120°41′27″E

The Tabacalera House is a heritage house in the City of San Fernando, Pampanga in the Philippines.

Built by Tabacalera-owned by Don Ramon Lopez. The first floor of the house served as the office of La Tabacalera, the Compañía General de Tabacos de Filipinas. The property was owned by Simeon Ocampo. During the Japanese Occupation, it was sequestered by the Japanese Imperial Army together with other residences in San Fernando, and served as the headquarters of the Kempeitai.

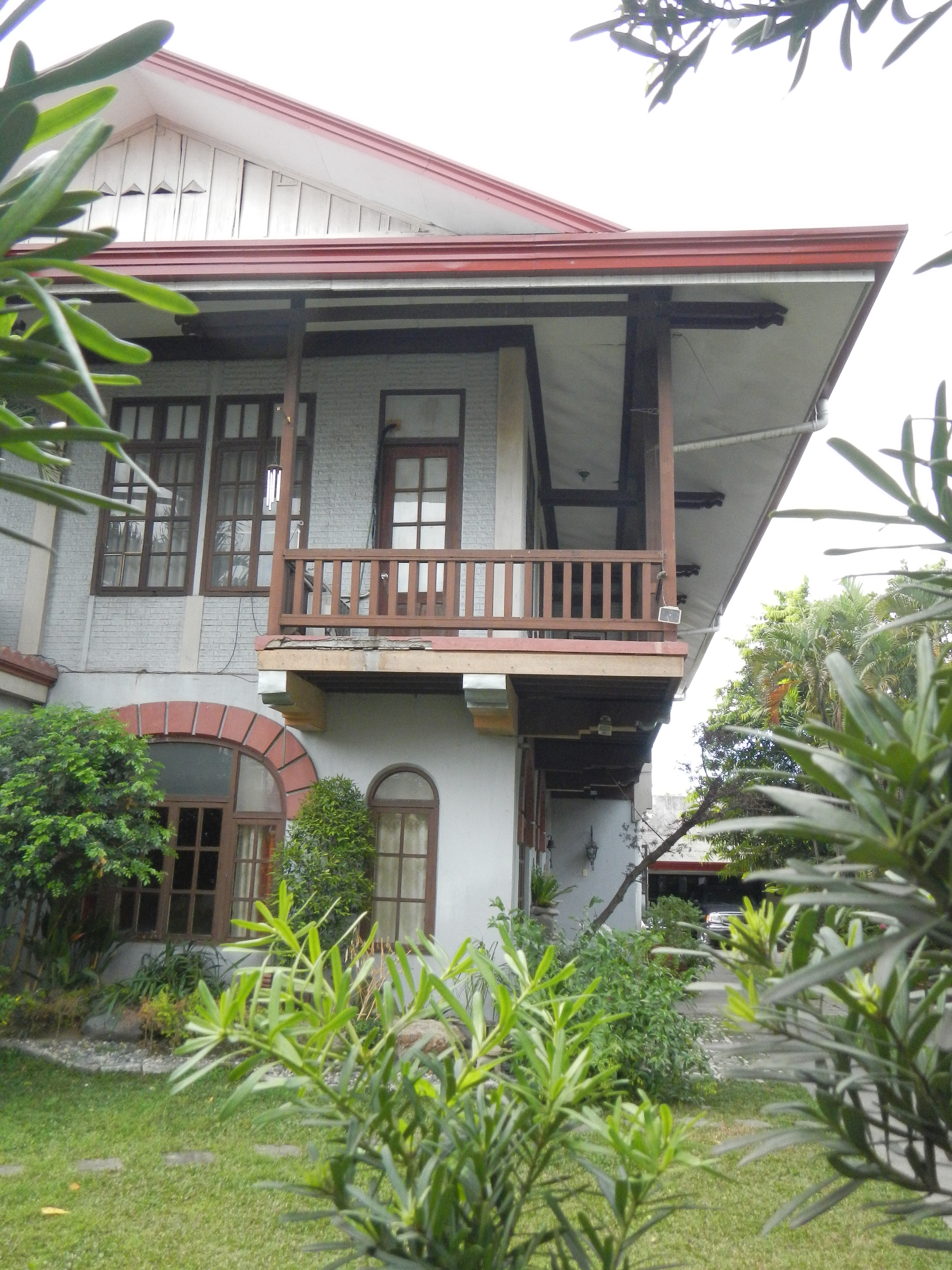
Right side of the house

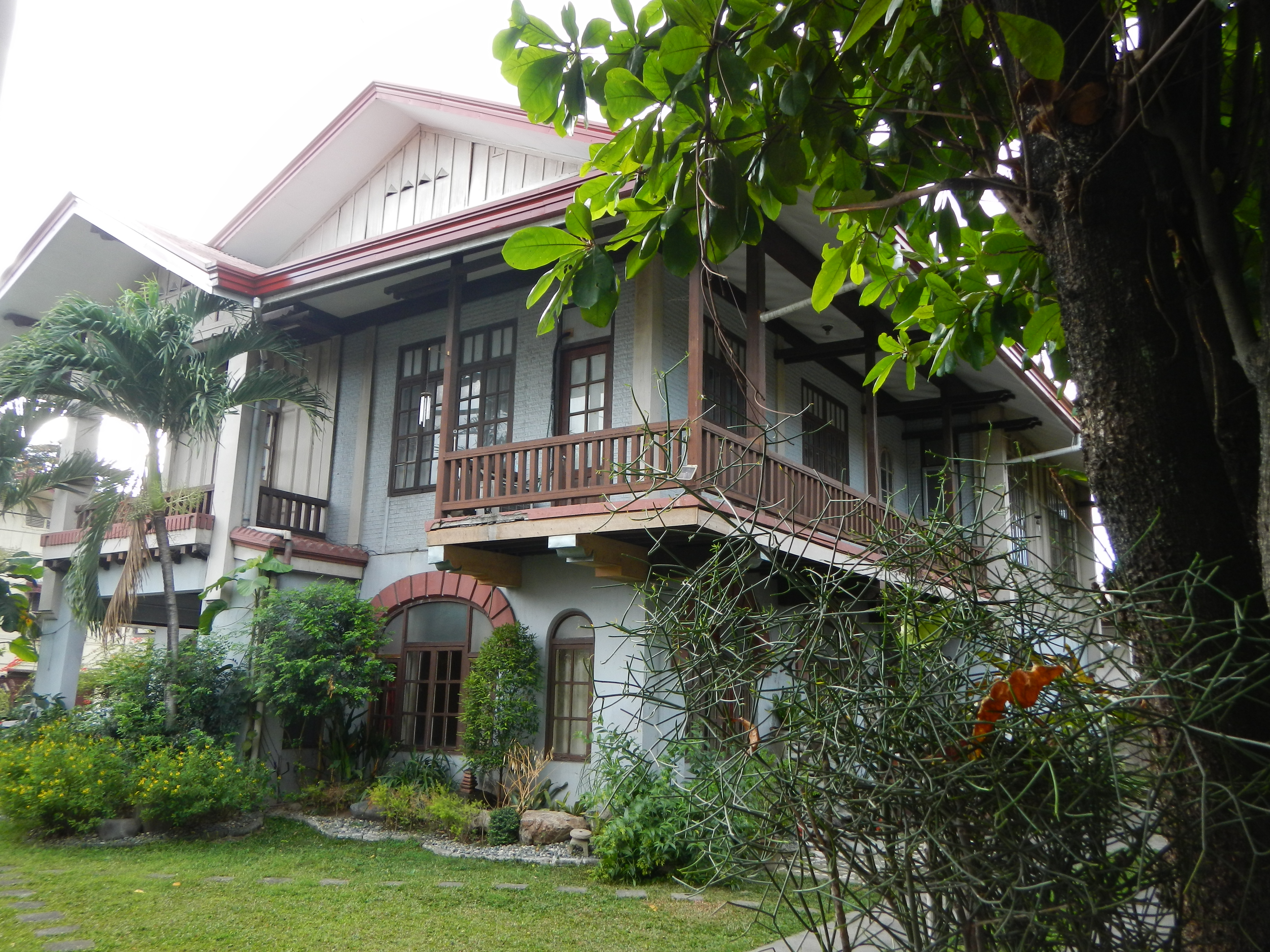
Façade of the Tabacalera House

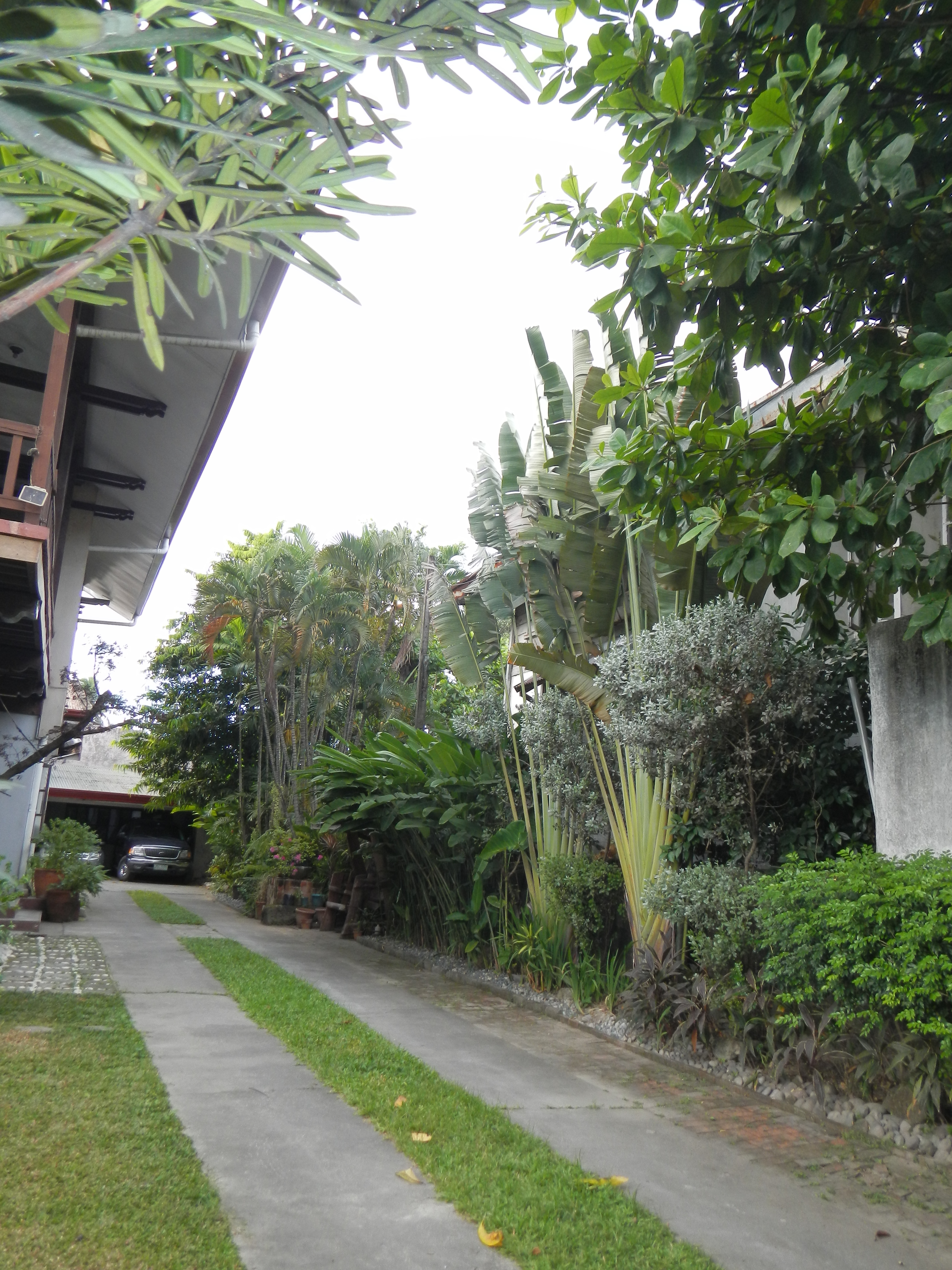
Driveway

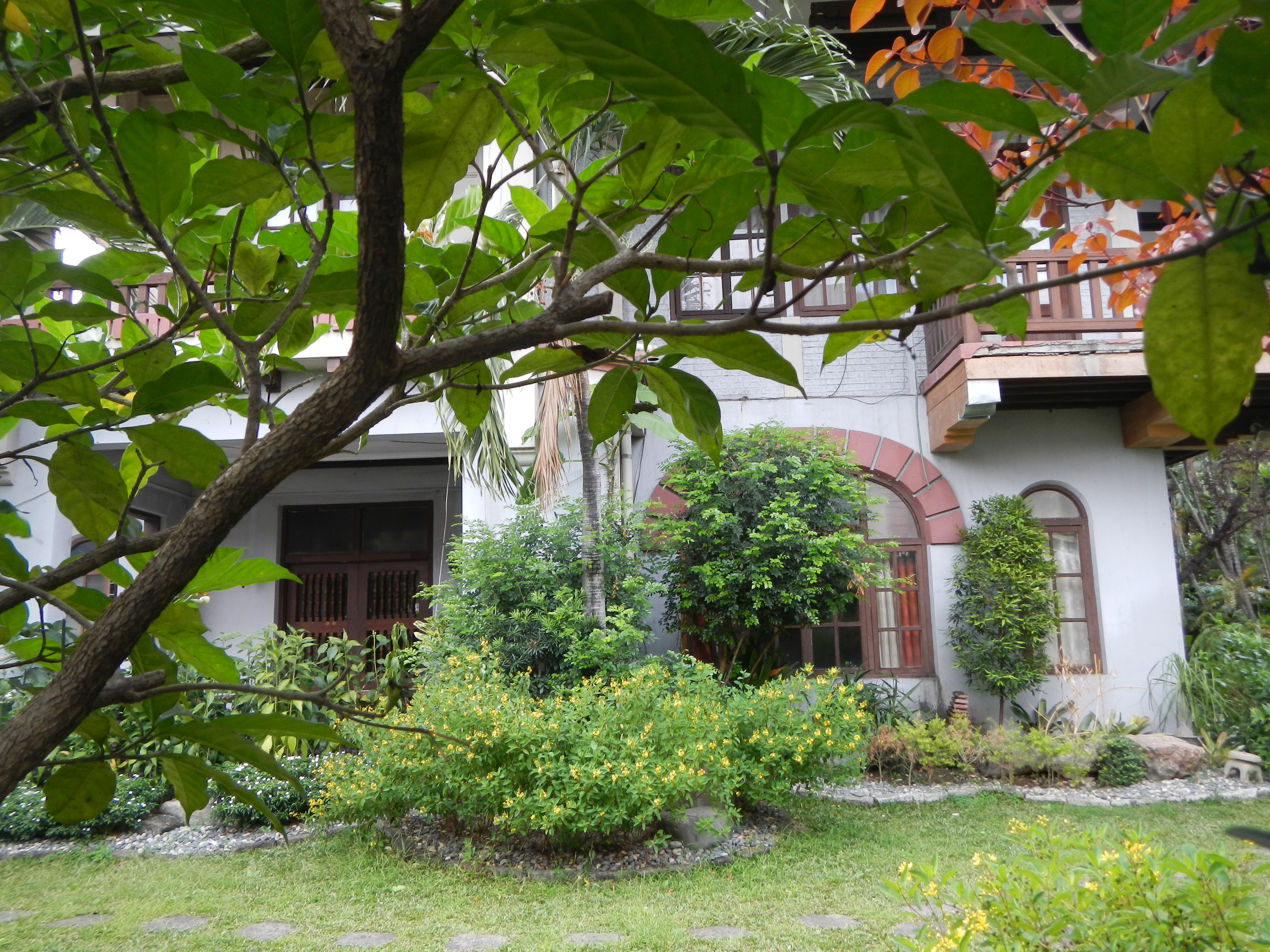
A peep from the fence, the ground floor of the house
