= Hizon–Singian House =

Coordinates: 15.0267°N 120.6919°E

- Bale Santungan ding Pamilyang Hizon Singian (Kapampangan)
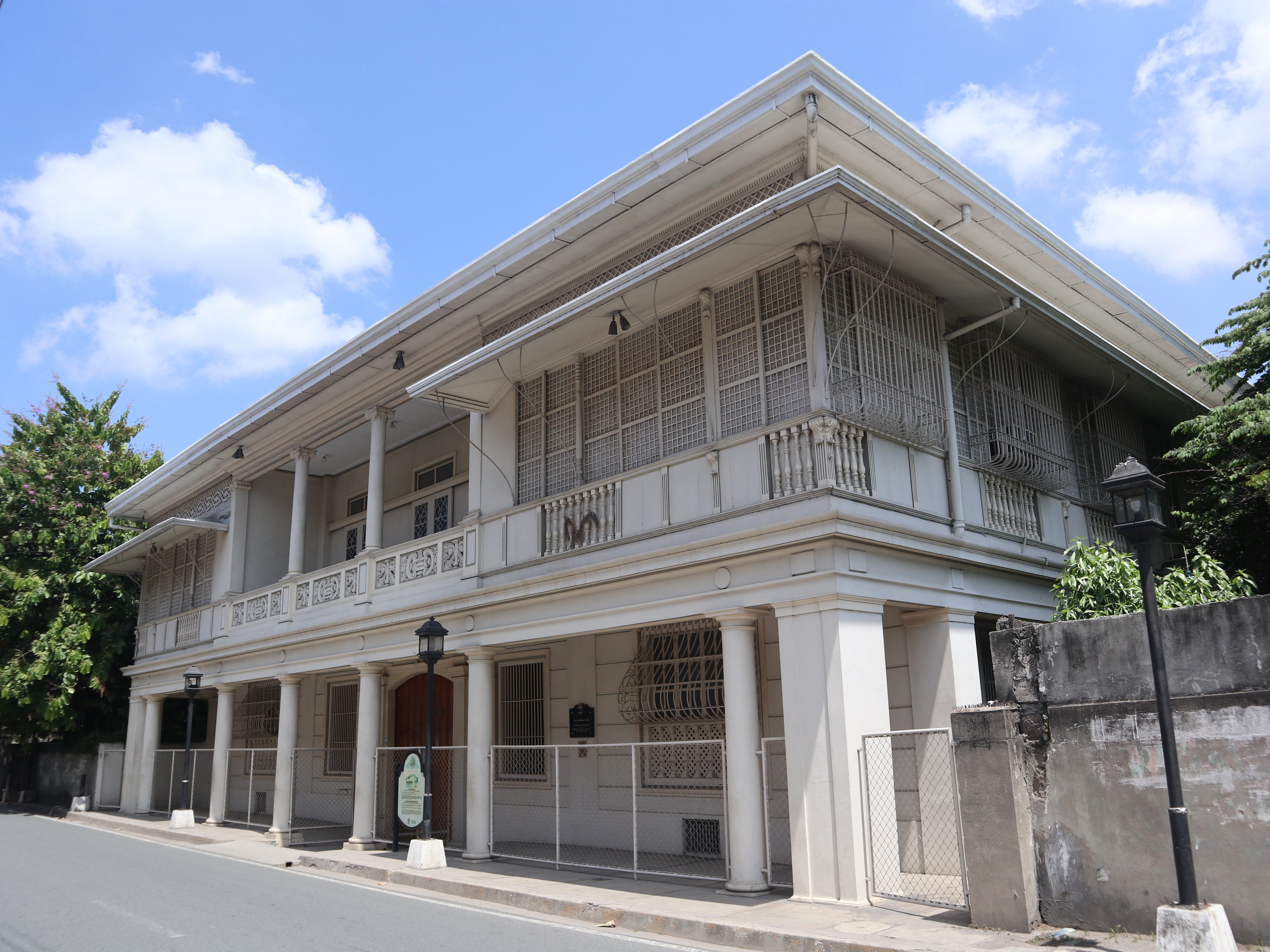
- Interactive map of the Hizon–Singian House area

General information
- Architectural style: Bahay na Bato
- Location: San Fernando, Pampanga, Philippines
- Completed: 1870

Technical details
- Floor count: 2

The Hizon–Singian House (Kapampangan: Bale Santungan ding Pamilyang Hizon Singian) is a Bahay na Bato heritage house located in the San Fernando, Pampanga.

== History ==
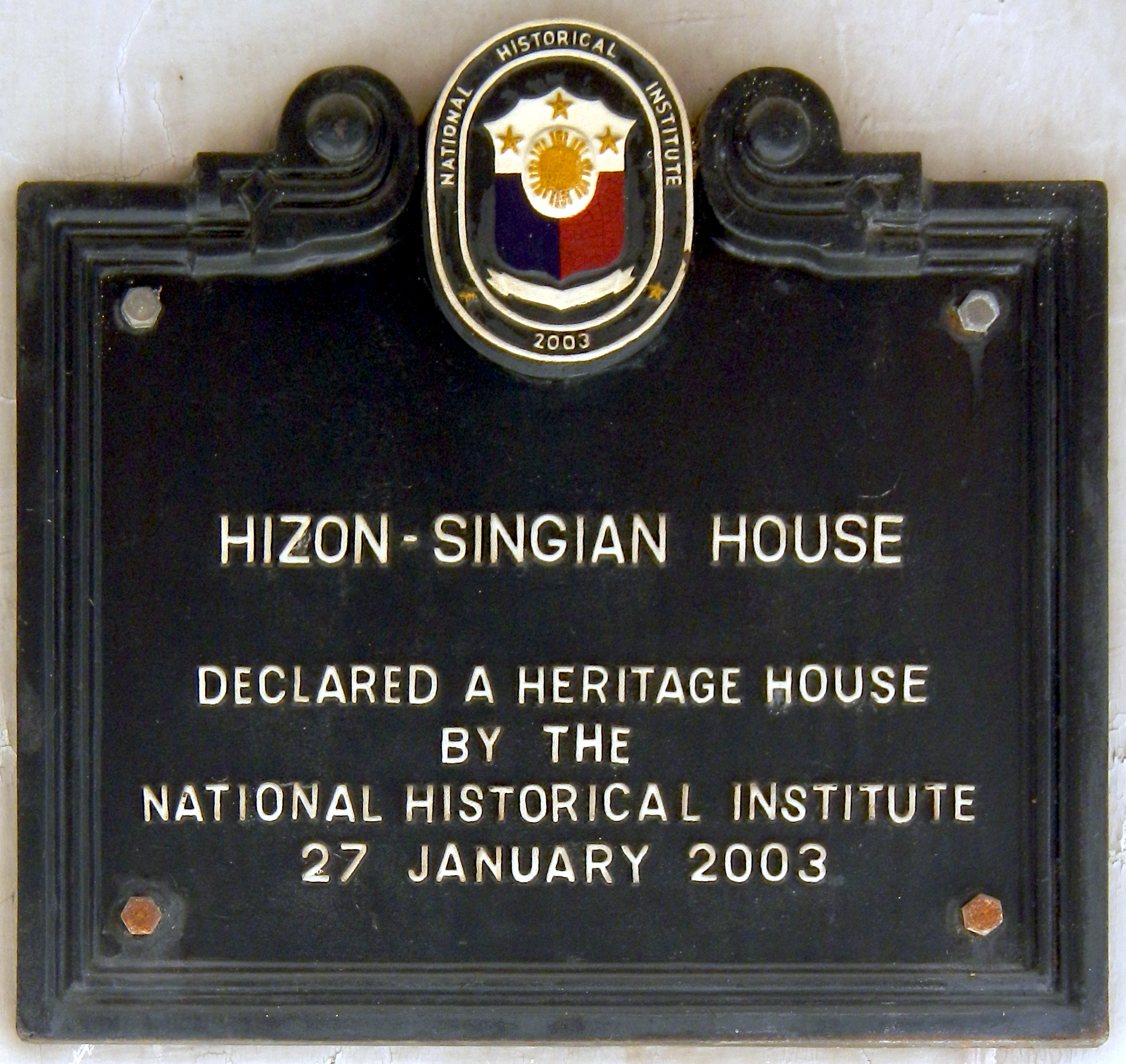
National Historical Institute marker installed in 2003

The building that would later be designated as the Hizon–Singian House was built in 1870 by the gobernadorcillo of San Fernando, Anacleto Hizon and Victoria Singian de Miranda y de Ocampo.

It was also used for military purposes; in the 1896 Philippine Revolution, it was occupied by Spanish general Antonio Ruiz. During World War II from 1943 to 1944, it was used by Imperial Japanese military forces as a troop barracks. When Americans took over, it functioned as the headquarters for American general Walter Krueger until 1945.

The house is judged as a well preserved example of a Spanish colonial period architecture, having been only slightly altered before World War II. It was declared a Heritage House by the National Historical Institute on January 27, 2003 by virtue of Resolution No. 4, S. 2003.
