= Marian Pastor Roces =

Filipino art critic and curator

Marian Pastor Roces is an art critic and curator based in Manila. Roces started writing art criticism in 1974 and since then she has penned numerous articles about traditional arts, museology, cultural theory, and politics. Her most recent book Gathering: Political Writing on Art and Culture (2019) is an anthology of her writings since the 1970s. Starting with her articles penned in the era of Ferdinand Marcos, "Roces has argued that art, culture, and politics are inseparable."

Roces acted as the director and curator of several museums, including Museo Ng Kalinangang Pilipino (Museum of Philippine Humanities), Museum of a History of Ideas at University of the Philippines, Yuchengco Museum, Museo Marino, and Museum of Contemporary Art and Design in Manila, among others. In the 1990s, she worked to create a global inventory of cultural heritage artefacts of the Philippines, which are in private and museum collections outside of the Philippines.

== Books ==
Marian Pastor Roces has several books, including Fabrics of life (1985) and Sinaunang Habi: Philippine Ancestral Weave (1991) about her long-term research on textile traditions in Southeast Asia, as well as Puntóng Batangan: katwiran at dilà dine sa Batangas City (2006) about the oral language of Batangas Tagalog.

She contributed to numerous publications, including Sinaunang habi: Philippine ancestral weave (1991); Espiritu Santi: The Strange Life and Even Stranger Legacy of Santiago Bose (2003); Over Here: International Perspectives on Art and Culture (2004); Philippines. Art, Identity and Post-colonial Discourse (2008); The Biennial Reader: An Anthology on Large-Scale Perennial Exhibitions of Contemporary Art (2010); Philippines: an archipelago of exchange (2013); and InFlux: Contemporary Art in Asia (2013). Her writings appeared in many exhibition catalogues such as Piglas: Art At The Crossroads (1986); The Sensuous Eye (1987); Ex-change: Manila-Berlin (1988); Contemporary Art in Asia: Traditions/Tensions (1996); Simryn Gill: Body Politic (1997); Text & Subtext: Contemporary Art and Asian Woman (2000); Zero-in: private art, public lives (2002); Site + Sight: Translating Cultures (2003); Science Fictions (2003); and Ctrl+P (No.5) (2007), among others.

Published in 2019, her most recent book is titled Gathering: Political Writing on Art and Culture. This publication features a selection of her writings ranging from a 1974 article about photography to a 2018 keynote lecture about the intersection of conceptual art and authoritarianism in the Philippines. The title of the book refers to a 1991 article where she creates a dialogue between her theoretical writing that draws on an exhibition and a discussion of artworks by Beth Jackson, past curator at Griffith University Art Museum, Brisbane.
