= Malolos Historic Town Center =

Malolos Historic Center and Heritage Town
- Makasaysayang Kabayanan at Pamana ng Bayan ng Malolos (Tagalog)
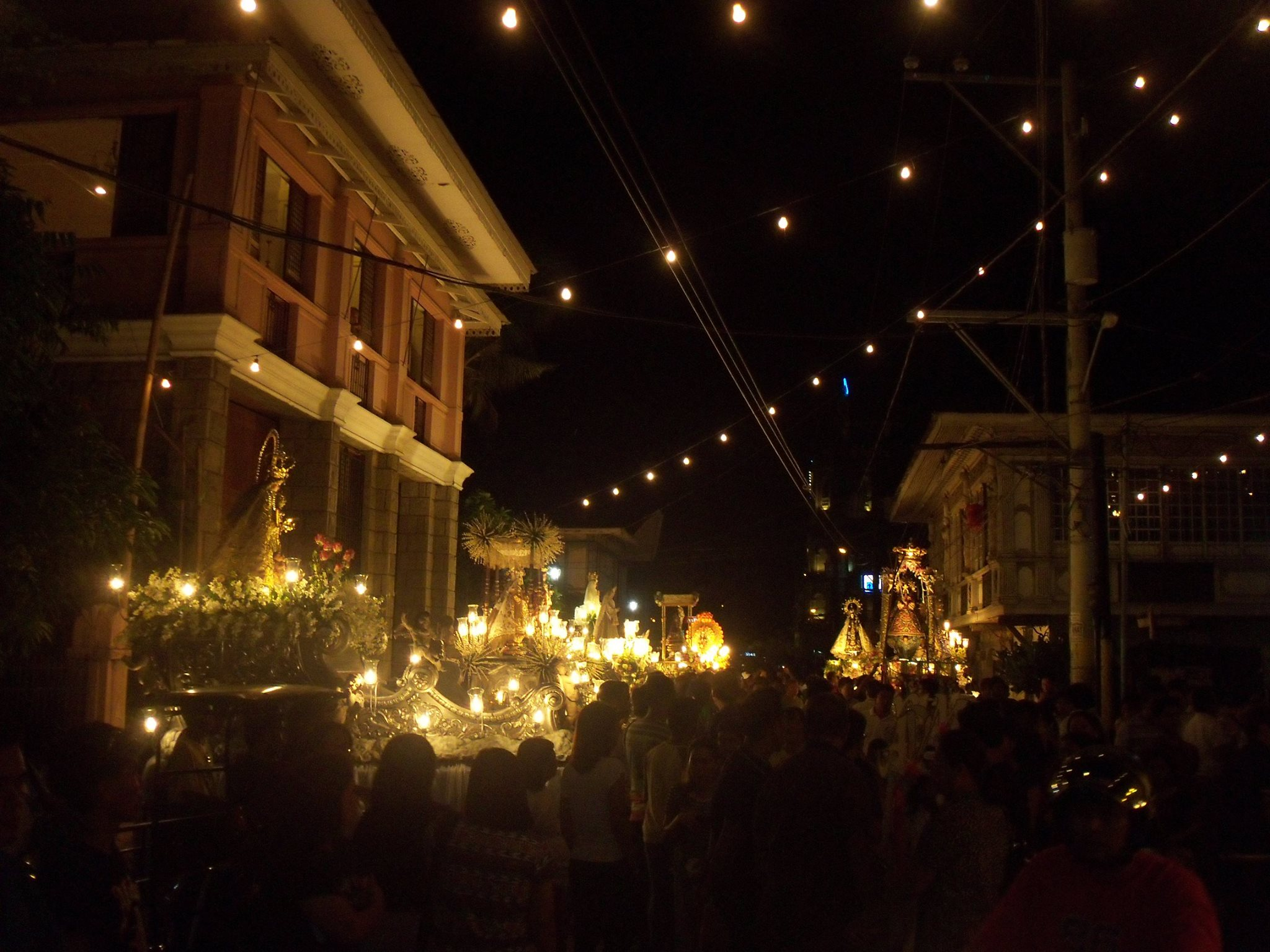
- The Calle Santo Nino one of the streets of Camestisuhan District at the heart of the declared Historic Town Center of Malolos

- Location within Philippines
- 14°50′40.2″N 120°48′40.6″E
- Type: Heritage Zone
- Location: Malolos Downtown City of Malolos, Bulacan, Philippines 3000

History
- Built: 1580, 1750, 1800, 1840, 1900, 1930, 1940

Site notes
- Architect: various
- Architectural styles: Spanish, American, Post-war
- Governing body: City Government of Malolos and National Historical Commission of the Philippines

The Malolos Historic Town Center is a historic district located in downtown (or the old town center of the capital town of) Malolos City, Bulacan, Philippines, commonly called the Camestisuhan or Pariancillo District of Malolos. It was declared as such for its collection of Spanish and American-era houses and government structures, and for being the birthplace of the First Philippine Republic and the Malolos Constitution as well as having been the capital of the Philippines from 1898 to 1900. The National Historical Institute (now the National Historical Commission of the Philippines) declared the downtown Malolos area officially as a National Historical Landmark and a Heritage Town on August 15, 2001.

== History ==
The Camestisuhan District of Malolos was originally called Pariancillo. It was the district intended for the Chinese residents of Malolos in the 1700s. It was started in 1755 when the Governor General of the Philippines ordered the expulsion of the Chinese from the Philippines due to their participation in some rebellion and sedition acts against the Spanish Government.

On documents such as the Registros Paroquiales or The Catholic Baptismal Registry of Malolos, the town already had its own "Parian" (a kind of Chinatown) in 1710. Some of the Chinese in Manila transferred to Malolos as it was already a hub for some Chinese and so that they could be far from the eyes of the Spanish Government in Manila. When he heard about this migration, the Governor General ordered that all Chinese migration destinations outside Manila should have a district for the Chinese for racial segregation. Thus the Malolos Pariancillo was established. Pariancillo means "small parian". A provision in the segregation order also stated that only those Chinese who have long been residents of the town who have married a native of Malolos will not be expelled. Thus the Sangleys of Malolos were born and the Pariancillo became the Chinese enclave in Bulacan Province.

== Rationale for the district's declaration as a Historic Town Center ==
The National Historical Institute board resolution cites several reasons for the declaration of certain areas in downtown Malolos as a National Historical Landmark and Heritage Town, or informally as parts of a Historic Town Center:

- A number of men and women from Malolos became key figures in revolutionary movements during the Spanish era;
- Malolos was declared the capital of the First Philippine Republic and its Spanish-era infrastructure were reused as government offices, e.g. the convent of the Malolos Cathedral, Barasoain Church, and several houses along the Pariancillo/Kamestisuhan district;
- Malolos has retained a good number of noteworthy old houses and other buildings that attest to the artistry, craftsmanship and ingenuity of its builders

== Declared areas ==
According to the board resolution, the following streets are identified as part of the Malolos Historic Town Center:

Street Name	Barangay
Paseo del Congreso Street from Barasoain church to Malolos bridge	San Agustin
Padre Jose Burgos Street bound by Enriquez St. and Malolos Bridge	San Agustin
Hipolito Street bound by P. Burgos and Enriquez Streets	San Agustin
Cigarillera Street (Tampoy)	Santo Niño
Pariancillo Street	Santo Niño
Santo Niño Street	Santo Niño
F.T. Reyes (Electricidad) bound by Santo Niño Street and M. Tengco Street	Santo Niño
M. Tengco Street bound by F. T. Reyes and F. Estrella Streets	Santo Niño
F. Estrella Street bound by Liang River and Kanto Boy Street	Santo Niño
Santiago - Cruz House at Jacinto Street (Pariancillo)	Santo Niño
Pineda and Aldaba Houses at F. T. Reyes Street	Santo Niño
Malolos Water Cistern at Plaza Torres	San Vicente

== Built heritage ==
=== Within the declared Heritage District ===
The following table lists down extant built heritage within the areas declared by the National Historical Institute:

Cultural Property wmph identifier (Note: wmph is an internal identifier used by Wikimedia Philippines to identify the monument. This is not an official identifier, and only shown temporarily in the templates until the government creates an updated complete list.)	Site name	Description	Province	City or municipality	Address	Coordinates	Image
	Abad House	Ancestral house	Bulacan	City of Malolos	Cigarillera Street	14°50′38″N 120°48′39″E	Upload file
	Plaza de la Gobierno Militar	Former ancestral house of Doña Gregoria Adriano, became the site of the Military Government established by Gen. Isidoro Torres, later reused as a Meralco office	Bulacan	City of Malolos	Pariancillo Street	14°50′35″N 120°48′38″E	Upload file
	Dr. Johnny Reyes House	Ancestral house	Bulacan	City of Malolos	752 F. Estrella Street	14°50′31″N 120°48′41″E	Upload file
	Casa Real Shrine	Built in 1580, this served as the residence and office of the Gobernadorcillo of Malolos. It became the Treasury of the Spanish Government building during the British Invasion of Manila and Casa Real in 1901. Today it is the Museum of Philippine Political History	Bulacan	City of Malolos	Paseo del Congreso Road	14°50′40″N 120°48′42″E	Upload file
	Casa Tribunal de Malolos	Built between 1740-1780, it was originally the house of a wealthy sugar and tobacco baron, Don Felipe Vasquez, and used as the Second Municipal Hall of Malolos in 1859. It was converted into a jailhouse during the First Philippine Republic in 1898	Bulacan	City of Malolos	Pariancillo Street	14°50′36″N 120°48′36″E	Upload file
	Cathedral - Minor Basilica and Parish of the Immaculate Conception	Built in 1580, the present masonry church was built in 1817	Bulacan	City of Malolos		14°50′33″N 120°48′42″E	Upload file
	Crisostomo House	Spanish-era ancestral house	Bulacan	City of Malolos	50 Pariancillo Street	14°50′34″N 120°48′34″E	Upload file
	Don Ramon Gonzalez de Leon House	Chalet-type ancestral house of former Gobernadorcillo Don Ramon Gonzales de Leon, rebuilt in 1923	Bulacan	City of Malolos	Cigarillera Street	14°50′38″N 120°48′38″E	Upload file
	Dr. Luis Santos Art-Deco House	Built in 1933, this is the Art Deco house of Dr Luis Uitangcoy Santos, son of one of the "women of Malolos", Doña Alberta Uitangcoy-Santos	Bulacan	City of Malolos	F. T. Reyes Street	14°50′30″N 120°48′40″E	Upload file
	Don Erastro Cervantes House	Spanish-era house	Bulacan	City of Malolos	Pariancillo Street	14°50′36″N 120°48′39″E	Upload file
	Eden Cinema	Post-war movie house	Bulacan	City of Malolos	Pariancillo Street	14°50′36″N 120°48′38″E	Upload file
	Don Fausto Chiong House	House of Don Fausto Chiong, built in 1892; it became the Secretaria de Interior (Administrative Office of the Interior) in 1898-1899	Bulacan	City of Malolos	Pariancillo Street	14°50′36″N 120°48′39″E	Upload file
	Fountain, Dr. Luis Santos House	Sculpture by National Artist Guillermo Tolentino	Bulacan	City of Malolos	F. T. Reyes Street	14°50′30″N 120°48′39″E	Upload file
	Hermogenes Reyes House	1904 house	Bulacan	City of Malolos	F. T. Reyes	14°50′32″N 120°48′37″E	Upload file
	Holy Infant Academy	Former clinic of Dr. Luis Santos	Bulacan	City of Malolos	F. T. Reyes Street	14°50′31″N 120°48′39″E	Upload file
	Iglesia Filipiniana Independiente	The Aglipayan cathedral church of Malolos built in 1903	Bulacan	City of Malolos	F. Estrella Street	14°50′28″N 120°48′44″E	Upload file
	1893 Jose Cojuangco House (Tagalog: Pook Kapanganakan ni Jose Cojuanco)	Birthplace of Jose Chichioco Cojuangco, with marker from the National Historical Commission of the Philippines	Bulacan	City of Malolos	Paseo del Congreso	14°50′42″N 120°48′46″E	Upload file
	1930 Jacinto-Lomotan House	American-era house	Bulacan	City of Malolos	Santo Niño Street	14°50′34″N 120°48′36″E	Upload file
	Paaralang Bayan ng Malolos	Mission-Style, Gabaldon-type schoolhouse built in 1913	Bulacan	City of Malolos	F. Estrella Street	14°50′22″N 120°48′48″E	Upload file
	Malolos City Hall	Neo-Classical town hall erected in 1940	Bulacan	City of Malolos	F. Estrella Street	14°50′38″N 120°48′40″E	Upload file
	Aguas Potables de Malolos	American-period water tank built in 1923	Bulacan	City of Malolos	Plaza Torres	14°50′34″N 120°48′45″E	Upload file
	1930 Mariano Crisostomo House	American-era house	Bulacan	City of Malolos	F. Estrella Street	14°50′26″N 120°48′45″E	Upload file
	Our Lady of Mount Carmel Parish Church	Built in 1885, popularly referred to as Barasoain Church	Bulacan	City of Malolos	Paseo del Congreso Road	14°50′47″N 120°48′45″E	Upload file
	1930 Tantoco-Lopez House		Bulacan	City of Malolos	Santo Niño Street	14°50′34″N 120°48′38″E	Upload file
	Capilla de Santa Veronica	Ancestral house of the Reyes family converted into a private chapel	Bulacan	City of Malolos	Santo Niño Street	14°50′34″N 120°48′36″E	Upload file
	Capilla de Nuestra Señora del Santisimo Rosario de Malolos	Stone chapel built in 1870	Bulacan	City of Malolos	F. Estrella Street	14°50′25″N 120°48′43″E	Upload file
	Don Jose Bautista House	Spanish-era house famous for its caryatid posts. Has ornately-sculpted Neo-Classic touches and was built in the 1850s and redecorated in 1877 in the French Art Nouveau style. It was the Secretaria de Fomento and home of Don Antonio Bautista, Aguinaldo's Secretary of the Interior. It contains heirloom memorabilia including the original KKK flag. Here, José Rizal and Marcelo H. del Pilar spoke to the "21 women of Malolos" on June 27, 1892	Bulacan	City of Malolos	Santo Niño Street	14°50′33″N 120°48′37″E	Upload file
	Paaralan ng mga Kababaihan ng Malolos	Remaining stone wall or ruins of the Instituto Mujeres, with marker from the National Historical Commission of the Philippines. Site where Rizal addressed his famous letter to the 21 women of Malolos who petitioned Governor General Valeriano Weyler for a night school for women on December 12, 1888	Bulacan	City of Malolos	Santo Niño Street	14°50′33″N 120°48′35″E	Upload file
	Tampoy Bridge	Also known as Malolos Bridge, a Spanish-era bridge built in 1817 by Fr. Melchor Fernandez OSA and renovated during the American Period in 1925	Bulacan	City of Malolos		14°50′38″N 120°48′41″E	Upload file
	1812 Antonio Bautista House	Stone house built in 1812, the oldest in Malolos, owned by Chinese matriarch Doña Rufina Tanjosoy Santos and her son Don Antonio Bautista. The house is famous for its Art-Nouveau interiors, with design contributions from Isabelo Tampingco done in 1910	Bulacan	City of Malolos	Calle Burgos cor. Paseo del Congreso Road	14°50′41″N 120°48′41″E	Upload file
	1914 Alberta Uitangcoy-Santos House	Declared a Heritage House (Level 1) by the National Historical Commission of the Philippines	Bulacan	City of Malolos	F. T. Reyes Street	14°50′31″N 120°48′37″E	Upload file

=== Outside the Declared Area ===
The following table lists of structures in Malolos extant built heritage outside the declared National Historical Landmark by the National Historical Institute but are still covered by the National Cultural Heritage Act of 2009 as cultural property:

Cultural Property wmph identifier	Site name	Description	Province	City or municipality	Address	Coordinates	Image
	1858 Barasoain Catholic Cemetery	The Jacinto Masouleum built in 1859	Bulacan	City of Malolos	Calle Antonio Bautista	14°50′55″N 120°48′35″E	Upload file
	Bulacan Provincial Capitol	Art-deco capitol designed by Juan Arellano and William Parsons erected in 1930	Bulacan	City of Malolos		14°51′23″N 120°48′52″E	Upload file
	Fausto Chiong House	1933 American-era House	Bulacan	City of Malolos	Malolos-Hagonoy Provincial Road	14°50′24″N 120°48′06″E	Upload file
	Campo Santo de Malolos	Spanish-era cemetery built in 1680	Bulacan	City of Malolos	Tubigan Street	14°50′28″N 120°48′53″E	Upload file
	Estacion Ferrocaril de Malolos	Spanish-era train station built in 1892	Bulacan	City of Malolos		14°51′15″N 120°48′51″E	Upload file
	1863 Santa Isabel de Ungria Parish Church	Mudejar-style stone church	Bulacan	City of Malolos	Caluag Street	14°50′22″N 120°50′04″E	Upload file

== Important Cultural Properties ==
One of the features of Malolos Historic Town Center are the monuments created by the artisans and National Artist can be found at different areas in the city.

Structure	Provenance	Site Location	Artist
Stone Fountain	1933	Dr. Luis Santos Art Deco House	Guillermo Tolentino
Bounty Harvest Painting	1933	Dr. Luis Santos Art Deco House	Fernando Amorsolo
Gat Francisco Balagtas Marble Bust	1950	Malolos Plaza and Rotounda	Guillermo Tolentino, National Artist
Brass Bust of Marcelo Hilario del Pilar	1903	Malolos City Hall Plaza	Hilario Sunico, Bellcaster of 19th century
Brass Bust of Dr.Jose P. Rizal	1901	Plaza Rizal, Casa Real, Malolos City	Hilario Sunico, Bellcaster of 19th century
Bronze Statue of Emilio Aguinaldo	1950	Barasoain Church Plaza, Malolos City	Antonio Caedo, pre-National Artist
Gen.Isidoro Torres Monument	1950	Plaza Torres, Malolos Market	n/a
Jose Rizal Statue	1923	Malolos Central School	n/a
The Propagandista Triumvirate	1950	Bulacan Capitol Compound, Malolos	n/a
President Ramon Magsaysay	1960	Bulacan Capitol Compound, Malolos	
General Gregorio del Pilar	1950	Bulacan Capitol Plaza, Malolos	n/a

== See also ==
- Philippine Registry of Cultural Property
