= Heritage houses of the Philippines =

Heritage Houses
- Mga Pamanang Tahanan (Filipino)
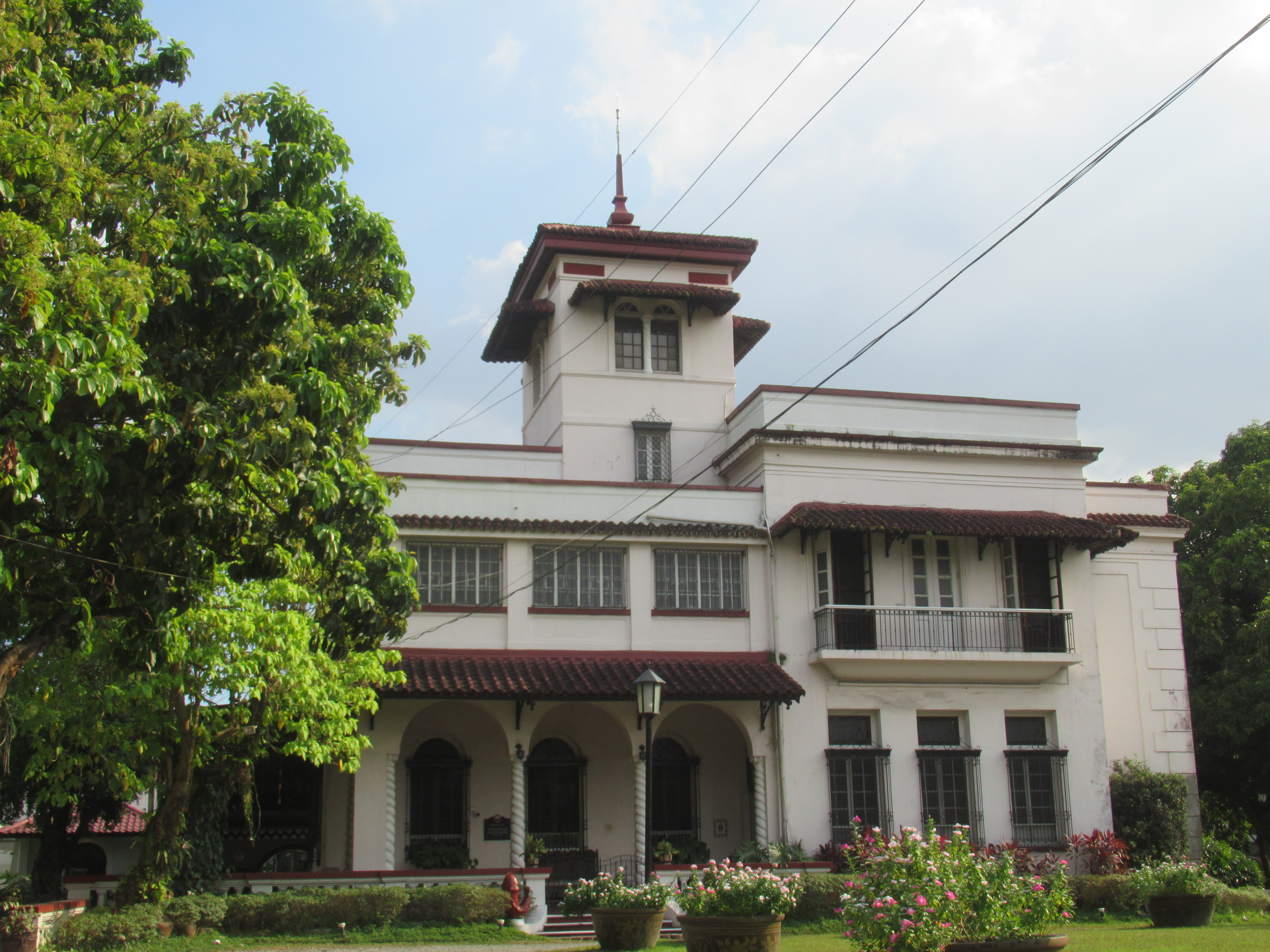
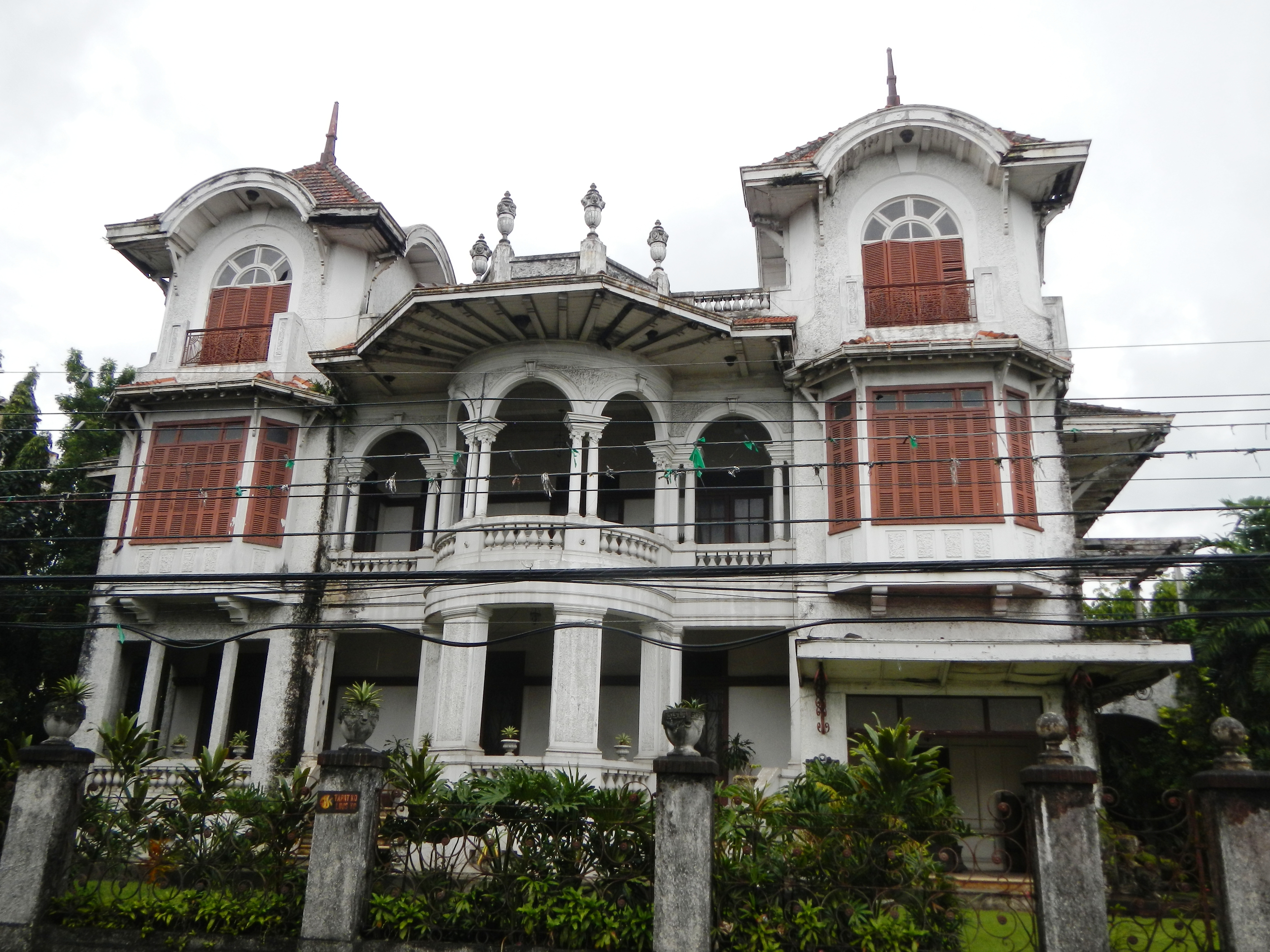
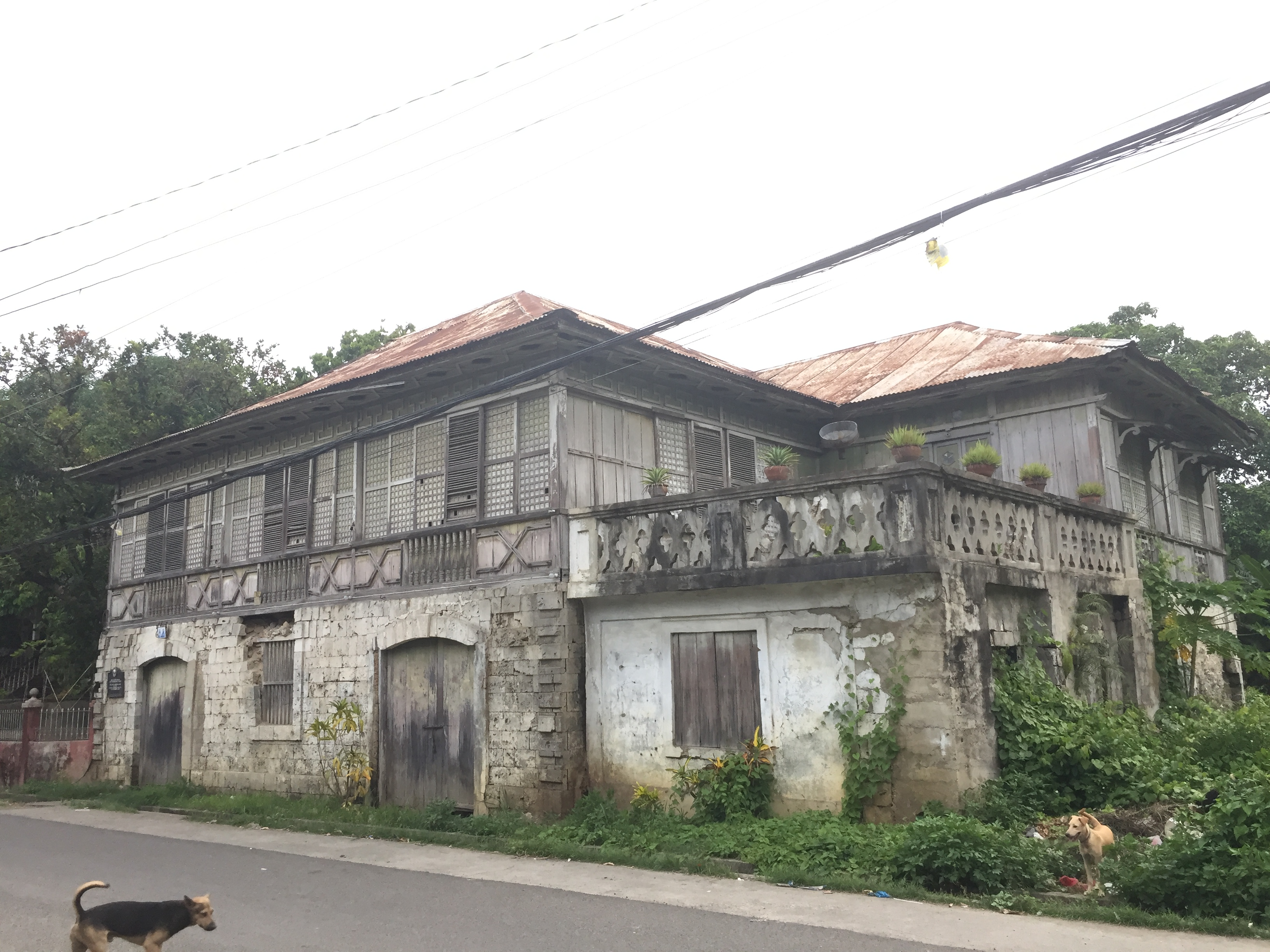
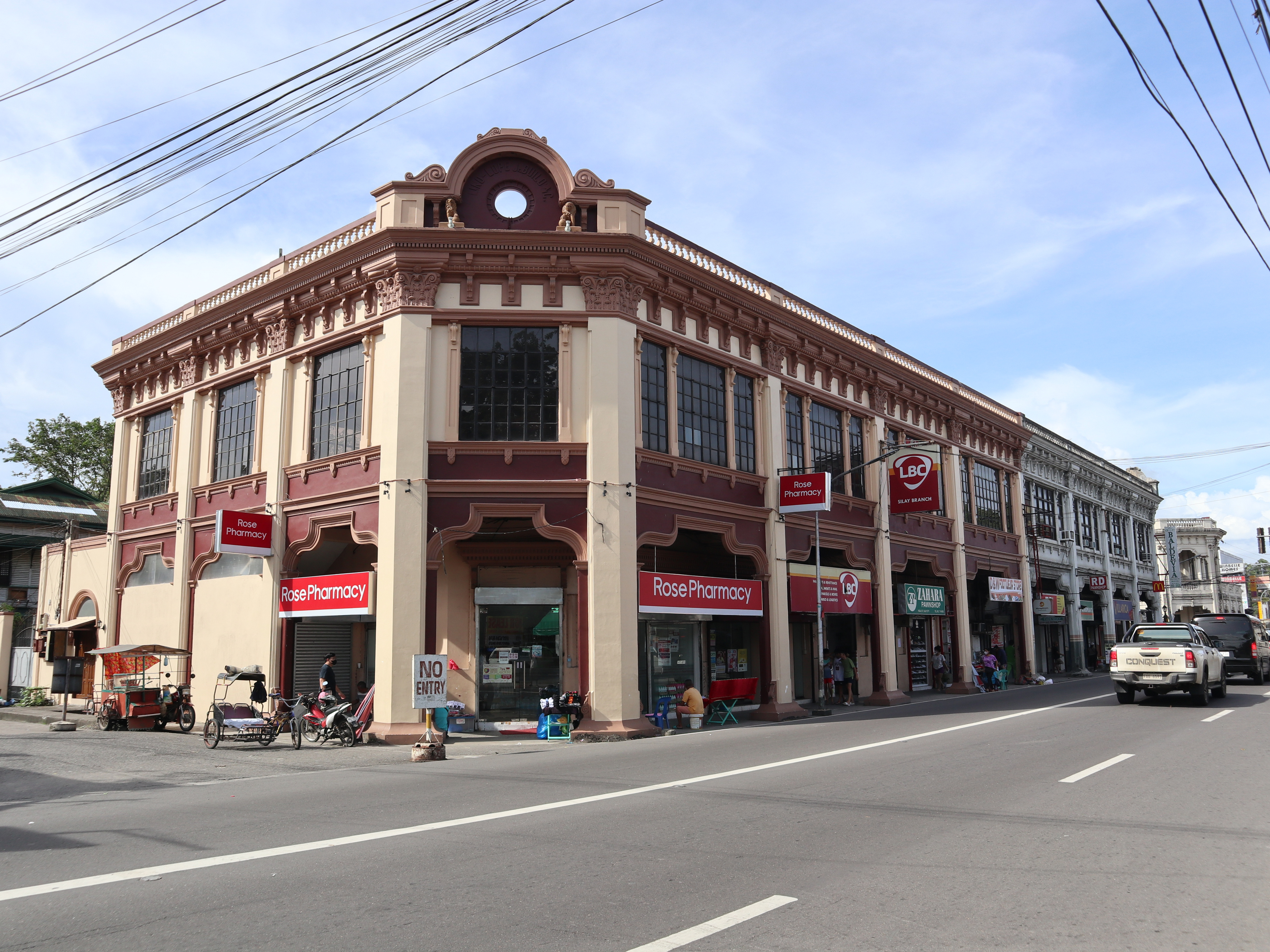
- Clockwise, from top left: Mira-Nila house in Quezon city, Natalio Enriquez House in Sariaya, Don Florencio Noel House in Carcar,Cebu, Severino Building in Silay city, Negros Occidental

Designation details
- Authority: National Historical Commission of the Philippines
- Country: Philippines

Heritage house is a declaration to houses in the Philippines which have significant cultural, historical, social, architectural and artistic value as designated by the National Historical Commission of the Philippines.

As of 2025, there are 60 heritage houses declared.

== Criteria for declaration ==
Any house in the Philippines can be declared a heritage house if they follow the following criteria set forth by the National Historical Commission of the Philippines:

- The house must be at least 50 years of age
- Must be representative of Development or style of architecture
- The house must retain at least 75% of its original structure and should not have undergone major renovations that significantly altered its authenticity.

== Declared heritage houses per region ==
=== National Capital Region ===
Official Heritage House Name (Note: Based on official documents of the National Historical Commission of the Philippines (NHCP) and its predecessor, the National Historical Institute (NHI))	Location	Description	Designation/ Declaration/ Official Marker	Year declared
Mira-nila House	Cubao, Quezon City	Art deco mansion of the built by Conrado Benitez. The name Mira-nila supposedly came from Helena Benitez, Conrado's daughter, who shouted "mira a Manila" ("look at Manila") to point out the fire in Intramuros in the 1930s	Resolution No. 04, S. 2011	2011
Lichauco House	Sta. Ana, Manila	A Bahay na bato built in 1859 occupied by affluent lawyer and diplomat Marcial Lichauco	Lichauco House 10 NHC Resolution No. 06, S. 2010	2011

=== Region I ===
Official Heritage House Name (Note: Based on official documents of the National Historical Commission of the Philippines (NHCP) and its predecessor, the National Historical Institute (NHI))	Location	Description	Designation/ Declaration/ Official Marker	Year declared
Side of Syquia Mansion Syquia Mansion	Vigan, Ilocos Sur	Large bahay na bato of Justo Angco built in 1830. Famous for being the home of Alice Syquia, first lady of the Philippines and wife of President Elpidio Quirino.	Syquia Mansion plate NHI. Board Resolution 1, s. 2002	2002

=== Region III ===
Official Heritage House Name (Note: Based on official documents of the National Historical Commission of the Philippines (NHCP) and its predecessor, the National Historical Institute (NHI))	Location	Description	Designation/ Declaration/ Official Marker	Year declared
Hizon Ancestral House (Note: Official marker installed by the National Historical Institute names it as Hension-Hizon House)	San Fernando, Pampanga	Bahay na bato built for Saturnino Henson y David.	Resolution No. 03, S. 2003	2003
Singian-Hizon Ancestral House (Note: Official marker installed by the National Historical Institute names the site as Hizon-Singian House)	San Fernando, Pampanga	Built in 1870 by Anacleto Hizon, Gobernadorcillo of San Fernando and Victoria Singian de Miranda y De campo	Resolution No. 04, S. 2003	2003
Cuyugan-Dayrit Ancestral House	San Fernando, Pampanga	American domestic style bahay na bato built in 1920 Joaquin Dayrit y Singian and Maria Paz Cuyugan y de Leon.	Resolution No. 05, S. 2003	2003
Lazatin Ancestral House	San Fernando, Pampanga	American style bahay na bato built in 1925 for Serafin Lazatin y Ocampo and Encarnacion Singian y Torres.	Resolution No. 6, S. 2003	2003
IJVAlbertaUitangcoy1 Alberta Uitangcoy House	Malolos City, Bulacan	House of Alberta Uitancoy, one of the 20 women of the town who were the first to build a night school to study the Spanish language. Now the Museum of the Women of Malolos.	Resolution No. 07, S. 2010	2010
Augusto P. Hizon House	San Fernando, Pampanga	Victorian-style mansion built by Teodoro and Africa Ventura which was eventually bought by Maria Salome Hizon, which was eventually inherited by Augusto Hizon.	Resolution No. 06, S. 2010	2010
Casa dela Fuente "Bahay na Malaki" (Note: The marker installed by the NHCP uses the name Dela fuente- Villaroman Ancestral house.)	San Rafael, Bulacan	A bahay na bato built by Don Vicente Trinidad dela Fuente in 1890.	NHCP no. 7, s. 2022	2022

=== Region IV-A ===
Official Heritage House Name (Note: Based on official documents of the National Historical Commission of the Philippines (NHCP) and its predecessor, the National Historical Institute (NHI))	Location	Description	Designation/ Declaration/ Official Marker	Year declared
Casa de Segunda (Lipa) Luz-Katigbak Ancestral House	Lipa,Batangas	Spanish colonial-era bahay na bato built in the 1860s for Don Manuel Mitra de San Miguel-Luz and Doña Segunda Solis Katigbak	Resolution No. 04, S. 1996	1996
Ylagan-De La Rosa Ancestral House	Taal, Batangas	Spanish colonial-era bahay na bato built in 1800 for Don Julian Ylagan and Doña Dionisia Agoncillo-Ylagan	Resolution No. 09, S. 1998	1998
Goco Ancestral House	Taal, Batangas	Spanish colonial-era bahay na bato built for Don Juan Goco, KKK treasurer	NHI Board Resolution No. 03, S. 2000	2000
Sarayba House	Gen. Trias, Cavite	Bahay na bato of Doña Maria Dolores Gomes-Trias	Resolution No. 06, S. 2005	2005
Natalio Enriquez House	Sariaya, Quezon	Art deco mansion built in 1932 by Arch. Andres Luna de San Pedro for Natalio Enriquez, Governor of Tayabas (1940–1946)	Resolution No. 02, S. 2008	2008
Rodriguez House	Sariaya, Quezon	A bahay na bato built in 1922 for Don Catalino Rodriguez, town Presidente of Sariaya in the 1910s	Resolution No. 03, S. 2008	2008
Gala-Rodriguez House	Sariaya, Quezon	1930s Art deco mansion designed by National Artist Juan Nakpil for Dr. Isidro Rodriguez and Doña Gregoria Gala, wealthy plantation owners	Historical Marker Gala-Rodriguez House Resolution No. 06, S. 2008	2008

=== Region IV-B ===
Official Heritage House Name (Note: Based on official documents of the National Historical Commission of the Philippines (NHCP) and its predecessor, the National Historical Institute (NHI))	Location	Description	Designation/ Declaration/ Official Marker	Year Installed
Casa Narvas	Boac, Marinduque	Spanish colonial-era bahay na bato built in the 1892 by Vicente Narvas	Resolution No. 01, S. 2007	2007

=== Region VI -Western Visayas ===
Official Heritage House Name (Note: Based on official documents of the National Historical Commission of the Philippines (NHCP) and its predecessor, the National Historical Institute (NHI))	Location	Description	Designation/ Declaration/ Official Marker	Year declared
Lopez Ancestral House	La Paz, Iloilo City	Also referred to as the Lopez Boathouse, the Streamline Moderne mansion was built in 1935 for the wealthy Lopez family of Iloilo.	Resolution No. 03, S. 2002	2002
Roca Encantada	Buenavista, Guimaras	Translates to Enchanted rock, this mansion on an island, with its current iteration built in the 1940s and modifications in 2002, was built for the Lopez family of Iloilo.	Resolution No. 12, S. 2002	2002
Bahay na Bato in Antique	San Jose de Buenavista, Antique	Also known as the Azurin-Gella House, the site is a restored 19th century Bahay na bato, only extant example of bahay na bato architecture in Antique.	Resolution No. 07, S. 2020	2020
Ledesma Ancestral House	Jaro, Iloilo City	A bahay na bato built by Doña Pacita Lopez in the 1820s. Occupied by the Ledesma family.	Resolution No. 14, S. 2022	2022
Celso Ledesma Mansion	City Proper, Iloilo City	Also known as the Eagle House, it is located within the Calle Real Heritage Zone and was built in 1922 for Don Celso Ledesma.	Resolution No. 27, S. 2024	2024

=== Region VII ===
Official Heritage House Name (Note: Based on official documents of the National Historical Commission of the Philippines (NHCP) and its predecessor, the National Historical Institute (NHI))	Location	Description	Designation/ Declaration/ Official Marker	Year declared
Clarin Ancestral House	Loay, Bohol	Spanish colonial-era style bahay na bato built in 1844 for Don Aniceto Velez Clarin. Notable for its use of Nipa leaves, a rarity in old homes in the Philippines due to its fragility.	Resolution No. 08, S. 1998	1998
Silva House	Carcar, Cebu	Built in the 1880s by brothers Benito Silva and Father Anastacio Del Coro from reclaimed materials	Silva house historical marker Resolution No. 07, S. 2009	2009
Balay Na Tisa (Note: Additional name on the marker installed by the National Historical Institute is Sarmiento- Osmeña House)	Carcar, Cebu	A large limewashed bahay na bato built in Don Roman Sarmiento 1859 famed for its preserved red clay tiles, a rarity now in the Philippines, from which it is named	Resolution No. 08, S. 2009	2009
"Sa Dakong Balay” (Don Florencio Noel House) (Note: Resolution designating this house names it as "Sa Dakong Balay". The marker on the other hand names the site as "Ang Dakong Balay".)	Carcar, Cebu	Coralstone and wood Bahay na bato of Don Florencio Noel built in the late 1880s	Resolution No. 09, S. 2009	2009
Mercado Ancestral Home Mercado Mansion	Carcar, Cebu	Early 19th century bahay na bato built by Don Mariano Mercado	Resolution No. 10, S. 2009	2009
Carlos P. Garcia House	Tagbilaran, Bohol	Provincial residence of Carlos P. Garcia, 8th President of the Republic of the Philippines. Built in the early 1950s, the house was originally rented from the Jorolan family.	Resolution No. 10, S. 2009	2009

=== Negros Island Region (NIR) ===
Official Heritage House Name (Note: Based on official documents of the National Historical Commission of the Philippines (NHCP) and its predecessor, the National Historical Institute (NHI))	Location	Description	Designation/ Declaration/ Official Marker	Year Installed
Manuel Severino Hofileña Ancestral House	Silay, Negros Occidental	Built in 1934, this fusion of art deco and art nouveau mansion served as the ancestral house of the Hofileña family	NHI Board Resolution no . 3, S. 1993	1993
Claudio Hilado Akol Ancestral House	Silay, Negros Occidental	Largely demolished. Lot now owned by the Locsin Genealogy Foundation	NHI Board Resolution no . 3, S. 1993	1993
Manuel de la Rama Locsin Ancestral House	Silay, Negros Occidental	An arcaded American era residential and commercial building built by Manuel de la Rama Locsin in 1935.	NHI Board Resolution no . 3, S. 1993	1993
Felix Tad-y Lacson Ancestral House	Silay, Negros Occidental	Demolished in 2014	NHI Board Resolution no . 3, S. 1993	1993
Soledad and Maria Montelibano Lacson Ancestral House	Silay, Negros Occidental		NHI Board Resolution no . 3, S. 1993	1993
Kapitan Marciano Montelibano Lacson Ancestral House	Silay, Negros Occidental	Spanish colonial-era bahay na bato turned commercial space of Capt. Marciano Montelibano Lacson	NHI Board Resolution no . 3, S. 1993	1993
Vicente Conlu Lacson Ancestral House	Silay, Negros Occidental	Spanish colonial-era bahay na bato of Vicente Conlu Lacson.	NHI Board Resolution no . 3, S. 1993	1993
Maria Ledesma Goles Ancestral House	Silay, Negros Occidental	An expansive art deco house of Maria Ledesma Goles. Adaptively reused as a bank.	NHI Board Resolution no . 3, S. 1993	1993
Jose Ledesma Ledesma Ancestral House (Note: Official Heritage house marker is Jose "Pitong" Ledesma Ancestral House.)	Silay, Negros Occidental	Spanish-American inspired ancestral house of the Ledesma family	NHI Board Resolution no . 3, S. 1993	1993
Teodoro Morada Heritage House Teodoro Morada Ancestral House	Silay, Negros Occidental	Spanish- American inspired two-storey house	NHI Board Resolution no . 3, S. 1993	1993
Generoso Reyes Gamboa Ancestral House	Silay, Negros Occidental	Twin Houses in the Spanish colonial-era bahay na bato style built for Generoso Reyes Gamboa's sons Ernesto and Generoso Jr.	NHI Board Resolution no . 3, S. 1993	1993
Digna Locsin Consing Ancestral House	Silay, Negros Occidental		NHI Board Resolution no . 3, S. 1993	1993
German Lacson Gaston Ancestral House	Silay, Negros Occidental		NHI Board Resolution no . 3, S. 1993	1993
Carlos Javelosa Jalandoni Ancestral House	Silay, Negros Occidental	American colonial-era bahay na bato which served as the ancestral home of the wealthy Jalandoni family	NHI Board Resolution no . 3, S. 1993	1993
Dr. Jose Corteza Locsin Ancestral House	Silay, Negros Occidental	Art deco ancestral House of former Philippine senator Dr. Jose Corteza Locsin	NHI Board Resolution no . 3, S. 1993	1993
Bernardino Jalandoni Ancestral House (Note: The name on the plaque is Bernardino-Ysabel Jalandoni Ancestral house)	Silay, Negros Occidental	Also known as the Pink house, the Spanish colonial-era style bahay na bato was the residence of Don Bernardino and Doña Ysabel Jalandoni.	Resolution No. 3 s. 1993	1993
German Locsin Unson Ancestral House	Silay, Negros Occidental	Spanish colonial revival house built in 1938	German Locsin Unson Ancestral House Historical Marker NHI Board Resolution no . 3, S. 1993	1993
Delfin Ledesma Ledesma Ancestral House	Silay, Negros Occidental		NHI Board Resolution no . 3, S. 1993	1993
Cesar Lacson Locsin Ancestral House	Silay, Negros Occidental	Spanish colonial-era style bahay na bato of Lacson-Locsin clan. Continues to be the site of the family bakery the El Ideal.	NHI Board Resolution no . 3, S. 1993 (Note: While cited in the plaque, the house is not found in NHI Resolution No. 3, S. 1993)	1993
Victor Fernandez Gaston Ancestral House	Silay, Negros Occidental	More famously known as Balay Negrense. A two-storey hacienda house of Victor F. Gaston and Prudencia Fernandez	Resolution No. 1 s. 1994	1994
Carlos Arceo Ledesma Ancestral House	Silay, Negros Occidental		Resolution No. 1 s. 1994	1994
Jose Benedicto Gamboa Ancestral House	Silay, Negros Occidental	An art deco house with a notable American style sun porch, built for Jose Benedicto Gamboa.	Resolution No. 1 s. 1994	1994
Angel Araneta Ledesma Ancestral House	Silay, Negros Occidental	American style bahay na bato of Angel Araneta	Resolution No. 1 s. 1994	1994
Benita Jara Ancestral House	Silay, Negros Occidental	Spanish colonial-era style bahay na bato of now the Silay City Sangguniang Panlungsod Building	Benita Jara Ancestral House Marker Resolution No. 1 s. 1994	1994
Amelia Hilado Flores Ancestral House	Silay, Negros Occidental		Resolution No. 1 s. 1994	1994
Alejandro Amercharuza Ancestral House	Silay, Negros Occidental		Resolution No. 1 s. 1994	1994
Jose Corteza Locsin Ancestral House Jose Corteza Locsin Ancestral House	Silay, Negros Occidental	Neo-Spanish Mission style mansion of Jose Corteza Locsin built in the 1930s.	Resolution No. 1 s. 1994	1994
Augusto Hilado Severino Ancestral House	Silay, Negros Occidental	Demolished. Site now owned by the Iglesia ni Cristo	Resolution No. 1 s. 1994	1994
Lino Lope Severino House Baldevia Building south (Rizal Street, Silay, Negros Occidental; 10-27-2022) Severino Building	Silay, Negros Occidental	Also known as the Baldevia, it is the house and commercial building of Lino Lope Severino, known to be the first department store in Negros.	Resolution No. 1 s. 1994	1994
Infante Heritage House	La Carlota, Negros Occidental	Hacienda house built by Don Teodulfo Infante and Doña Rosita Sanchez in 1929	NHI Board Resolution no . 1, S. 2001	2001

=== Region VIII ===
Official Heritage House Name (Note: Based on official documents of the National Historical Commission of the Philippines (NHCP) and its predecessor, the National Historical Institute (NHI))	Location	Description	Designation/ Declaration/ Official Marker	Year Installed
Oppus Ancestral House	Maasin, Southern Leyte	Bahay na bato of the Oppus family. Now houses the Southern Leyte Public Library	Resolution No. 07, S. 2005	2005

=== Region X ===
Official Heritage House Name (Note: Based on official documents of the National Historical Commission of the Philippines (NHCP) and its predecessor, the National Historical Institute (NHI))	Location	Description	Designation/ Declaration/ Official Marker	Year Installed
Macapagal-Macaraeg Ancestral House	Iligan, Lanao del Norte	Built in the 1950 for the Macaraeg family.		2002
