= Mga Kababayang Dalaga ng Malolos =

1889 letter penned by José Rizal

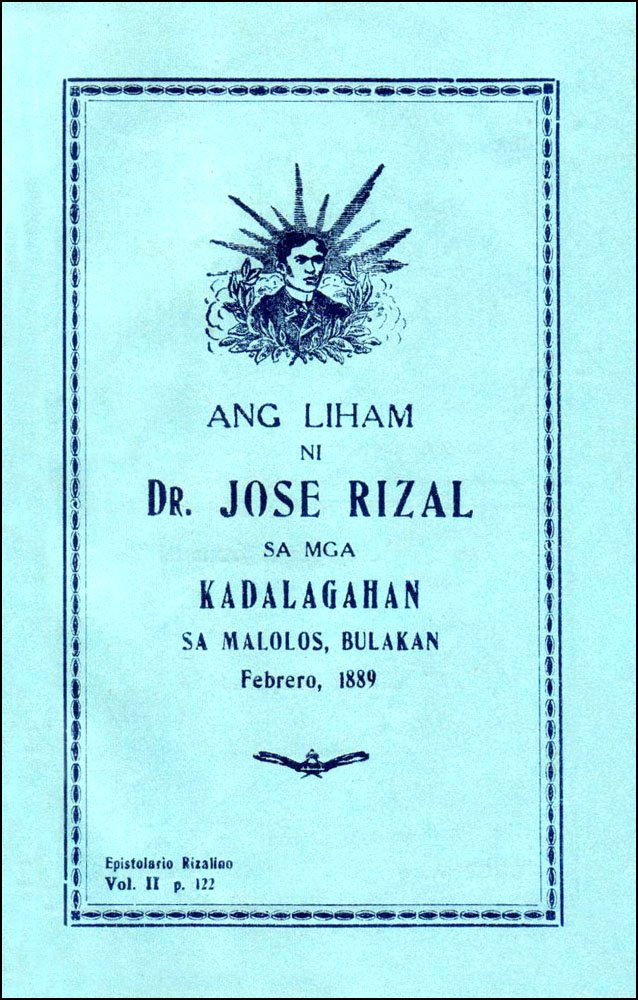
Cover of a reproduction of the letter in the Epistolario Rizalino (1930–39), a compilation of José Rizal's correspondence published by the National Library of the Philippines

Mga kababayang dalaga ng Malolos (English: To my countrymen, the young women of Malolos), also known by its alternative English title To the young women of Malolos, is a letter written by Filipino author and political reformer José Rizal on February 22, 1889. It is written in Tagalog and is addressed to a group of women from Malolos, Bulacan who successfully lobbied the Spanish colonial government to allow them to open a school so that they could study the Spanish language.

== Historical background ==
=== Women in the Philippines ===
With the arrival of Spanish conquistadors, the social construction of women in the Philippines was soon influenced by historical Spanish Catholic gender norms. American historian Edward Gaylord Bourne wrote in his 1902 introduction to The Philippine Islands, 1493–1898 that the imposition of Christianity "elevated the status of women" in the country. In contrast, modern historians highlight the relegation of women to domesticity and her diminished political and religious influence as babaylans, which were replaced by the Spanish friars. Charles R. Boxer surveyed literature and correspondence from the colonial era and referred to them as generally misogynistic, further describing the state imposed on the women as "the cult of Mary and the practice of misogyny." Feminist studies describe the Filipino woman of the Spanish colonial era as "her father's meek daughter, her husband's faithful subject, and the church's obedient servant and chaste virgin who yielded only to her husband."

=== Spanish colonial education ===
During the Spanish colonial period, formal education was primarily conducted by the religious orders in the country, led by the Spanish friars. Under the royal decrees issued by the Spanish Crown, guidelines for education included provisions for Spanish-language instruction to the native Filipinos. However, in practice, the majority of instruction was conducted in the native dialects.

The German travel writer Fedor Jagor, writing in 1875, found the education in the seminaries lacking, noting that "in spite of the long possessions of the islands by the Spaniards, their language has scarcely acquired any footing there." The Spanish author José Montero y Vidal observed that "public instruction is sufficiently far advanced" but added that "almost all the boys and girls who attend the schools read Spanish without understanding it, and write our language by drawing the letters materially." Vicente Barrantes, the secretary to Governor-General Emilio Terrero, admitted that "before 1865, primary instruction, properly so-called, was a vain shadow in the archipelago."

Both contemporary and modern arguments suggest that the limited instruction in the Spanish language was due to the fear of the clergy that knowledge of Spanish and a unity of language among the Filipinos could lead to insurrections and a revolution. Revolutionary leader Apolinario Mabini, during his exile in Guam in 1903, wrote:

If the Spaniards were to perpetuate their rule, they should perpetuate the ignorance and weakness of the native. ... The native should learn how to read the prayer-books and hagiographies translated into the country's dialects, but he must not know Spanish because then he would understand the laws and the decrees issued by higher authorities and cease to heed the advice of his parish priest, the friar. ... The Spanish government, working hand in hand with the friar, tried to isolate the Filipinos, intellectually and physically, from the outside world that they might not be subjected to the influences other than those both judged it convenient to allow."

==== Education of women ====
Formal education for women was limited, and the few educational institutions that existed for women offered little academic instruction in comparison to those for men.

When Santa Potenciana, the first school for girls in the Philippines was founded in 1589, the royal ordinance stated that "a convent for the shelter of girls may be founded, so that both those who should come from here and those born there may live in it and so that they may live modestly, and after well instructed, may go out therefrom to be married and bear children." The model was reinforced in the subsequent convent schools created for the instruction of women where "the educational program corresponded to the prevalent idea of feminine nature: it was predominantly concerned with the education of the heart and the will; and other intellectual subjects focused on religious doctrine." In the Beatrio de Pasig, founded in 1740 for the education of Filipino women, the curriculum was described as "reading, writing, Christian doctrine, sewing, embroidery, and other employments fitting for their sex." Despite writing that "primary instruction cannot be considered in a backward state," Spanish diplomat Sinibaldo de Mas "confessed" that the women "scarcely know other books than those of devotion."

==== Education Decree of 1863 ====
During a commission to draft a new set of regulations for schools in the Philippines, the vice-rector of the University of Santo Tomas, Father Francisco Gainza, voted against the teaching of Spanish "on the grounds that a unified language might open the door to Protestantism in the islands," but was overruled. The 1861 report of the commission subsequently formed part of the basis for the Education Decree of 1863, enacted by Queen Isabela II of Spain.

The decree was meant to introduce a free and compulsory educational system in the Philippines for all children between the ages of three seven and thirteen, and re-iterated the necessity of disseminating knowledge of the Spanish language to the masses. In a letter to Queen Isabella II, the colonial minister José de la Concha relayed the state of education in the territory thus far:

The governments and their delegated authorities, with the powerful aid of the missionaries, and of the clergy in general, both secular and regular, have tried to accommodate their policy in regards to the Philippine Archipelago ... But the extent of so vast a territory, the character and customs of a portion of its population, and the lack of an organized system of primary instruction, have been the reason why the knowledge of the Castilian language, and in consequence of the ignorance of the language, the propagation of the most elementary ideas of education remain in the remarkable condition of imperfection and backwardness. ... Said project setting forth from the necessity of broadening as much as possible the teaching of the holy Catholic faith, of the language of the fatherland ... establishes by means of its ministers a normal school under the care of the fathers of the Society of Jesus ... as a complement to the system which it establishes, it demands for the future, although after the expiration of a suitable time, the knowledge of the Spanish language as a necessary requisite for the exercise of public charges and duties, and for the enjoyment of certain privileges inherent thereto.

It found limited implementation, in part due to the continued reluctance of the clergy to teach Spanish to the masses. In their 1900 report to President William McKinley, commissioned after the Philippine territory was transferred from Spain to the United States in the Treaty of Paris of 1898, the Philippine Commission observed that the "wretchedly inadequate provision was, as a matter of fact, never carried out," adding:

It will be noted that education in Christian doctrine is placed before reading and writing, and, if the natives are to be believed, in many of the more remote districts instructions began and ended with this subject and was imparted in the local native dialect at that. It is further and persistently charged that the instruction in Spanish was in very many cases purely imaginary, because the local friars, who were formerly ex officio school inspectors, not only prohibited it, but took active measures to enforce their dictum. ... Girls were not given instruction in geography, history, or agriculture, but in place of these subjects were supposed to receive instruction "in employments suitable to their sex." It should be understood that the criticisms which have been here made apply to the provincial schools.

The report fueled the belief that the Spanish colonial education system existed merely "on paper" and that the teachers and students "had little real existence." However, Manuel L. Quezon, speaking to the United States Congress on October 1, 1914, stated that he himself was educated under the Spanish public education system, and that such schools were more widespread than the American report suggested.

==== Growth of private schools ====
By the 19th-century, there were numerous private primary and secondary schools that taught the Spanish language to Filipinos. These developed from the growing number of Filipino teachers and schoolmasters. These schools were attended by future political reforms and revolutionary leaders, including Apolinario Mabini, Miguel Malvar, and José Rizal. Other revolutionary leaders, including Artemio Ricarte and Teodoro Sandiko, were educators prior to the Philippine Revolution.

== Women of Malolos ==
A group of affluent women described as "from the elite class of the town, respected for their reputation and daughters of maginoos," sought to learn the Spanish language. The friar curate of Malolos, Father Felipe Garcia, opposed the idea and used his influence to get the school disapproved. Filipino historian Ambeth Ocampo puts forth that Father Garcia was attempting to maintain the Christian feminine ideal that the women's rightful place was in the home, for which they did not need a Spanish education.

=== Petition ===
On December 12, 1888, Alberta Uitangcoy, personally handed the letter to Governor-General Valeriano Weyler. The letter was reprinted in the first issue of La Solidaridad, published on February 15, 1898, and read:

Nosotras las jóvenes que suscriben y algunas más ante V. E. con el debido respeto nos presentamos y exponemos: que deseosas de saber el rico idioma español, estimuladas y agradecidas por vuestro generoso espíritu de generalizar en el país la lengua de castilla; y no pudiendo aprenderla en los colegios de Manila, algunas por su escasa fortuna, otras por las apremiantes circunstancias en que se encuentran en sus casas, ni hacerla de día por estar ocupados en quehaceres domésticos más perentorios: Con tal propósito a V. E. humildemente suplicamos se nos conceda una escuela nocturna en casa de una vieja parienta nuestra donde acudiremos en compañía de nuestras madres a recibir lecciones de gramática castellana bajo la ensenanza del profesor de latinidad retribuido por cuenta nuestra, quien en poco tiempo ha dado pruebas de aptitud para la enseñanza del castellano por el adelanto que manifestan sus discipulos, al paso que los maestros del pueblo, sin tratar por esto de ofender les en su profesión no han conseguido hasta la presente positives resultado. En gracia que no dudamos merece de la reconocida bondad de V. E. cuya importante vida, guarde Dios muchos años.

We the undersigned young women and others before Your Excellency introduce and present with all due respect: we desire to know the rich Spanish language, encouraged and grateful for your generous intention to spread the language of Castile in the country; and as we are unable to learn it from the schools of Manila, some of us because of our scant fortune, others because of the pressing needs in their homes, nor can it be done in the daytime because we are busy with peremptory domestic chores: For this purpose, we humbly beseech Your Excellency to permit us to open a night school in the home of a relative of ours, where we will go accompanied by our mothers to receive lessons in Spanish grammar from a teacher of Latin, salaried by us, who has in a short period given evidence of his aptitude for teaching the Castile language through the progress shown by his students, while the teachers of the town, whose professional good name we do not want to offend, have not achieved positive results. This mercy we do not doubt we shall obtain from the well-known kindness of Your Excellency, whose important life God may preserve for many years.

=== Contemporary reactions ===
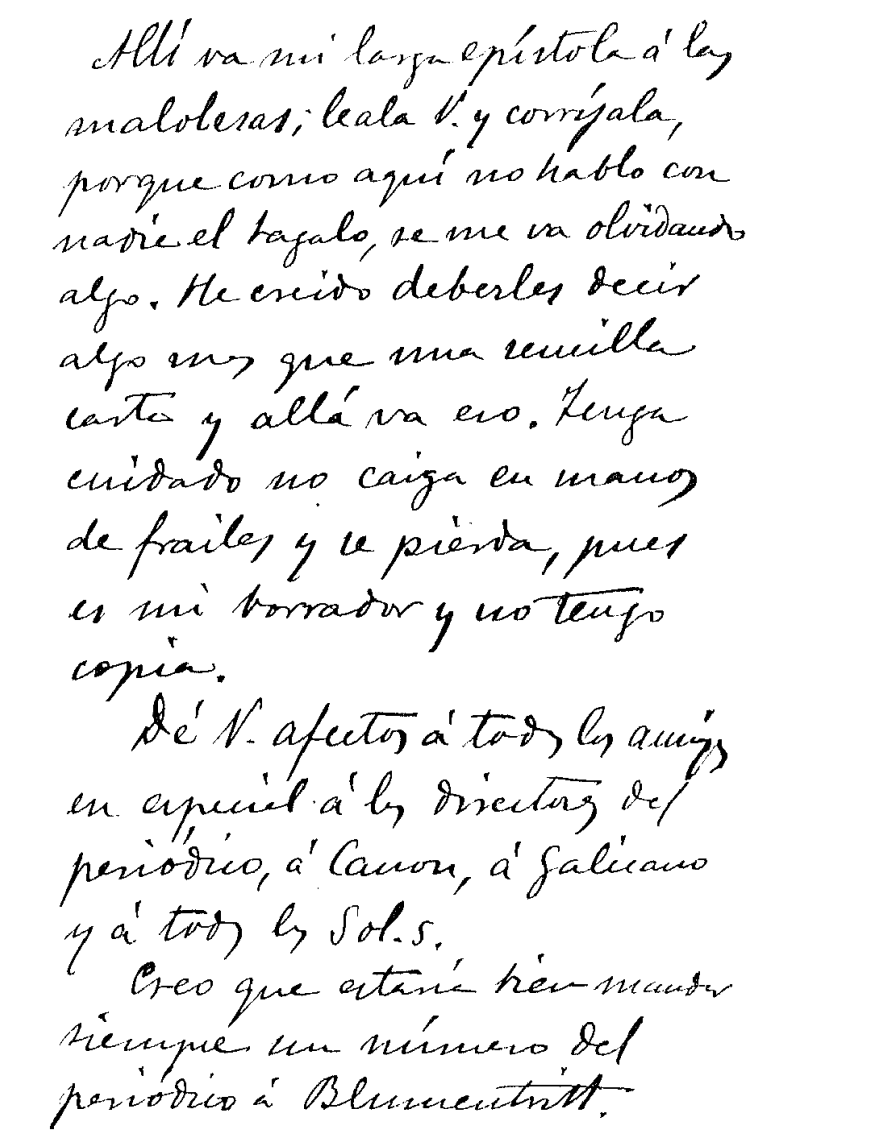
Facsimile of the letter written by José Rizal while in London, dated February 22, 1889, and addressed to Marcelo H. del Pilar

The actions of the women of Malolos were praised by the political reformists of the Propaganda Movement.

In the first issue of the Spanish-language La Solidaridad, the newspaper's founder, Graciano López Jaena, wrote an article entitled "Amor a España, o A las jóvenes de Malolos" (English: "Love for Spain, or To the Youth of Malolos"). The article lauded the women of Malolos and reproduced their letter to the Governor-General. In the March 15, 1889 issue, a sonnet entitled "A las dalagas malolenses" was dedicated to them. It was published under the name "Kutib," a pseudonym attributed to Fernando Canon.

After the first issue of La Solidaridad was published, the writer Marcelo H. del Pilar, who himself was from the province of Bulacan, sent a letter to José Rizal, suggesting that he read the article of López Jaena. Del Pilar urged Rizal to write a letter in Tagalog to "las muchachas de Malolos," adding that it would be "a help for our champions [campoenes] there and in Manila." At the time, Rizal was well known in the Philippines for his anti-clerical 1887 novel Noli Me Tángere. In his reply to Del Pilar, Rizal shared the handwritten manuscript of the letter he wrote to "las malolesas."

== Legacy ==
Scene from Ang Kababaihan ng Malolos (2014), filmed in the Uitangcoy-Santos ancestral house

In 2010, the house of Alberta Uitangcoy was declared a national heritage house by the National Historical Commission of the Philippines. It houses the Museo ng mga Kababaihan ng Malolos (English: Malolos Women's Museum).

The Tagalog-language musical docudrama Ang Kababaihan ng Malolos (2014), directed by Sari and Kiri Dalena, with a screenplay by historian Nicanor Tiongson, depicts the lives of the women of Malolos. The film stars Hazel Faith Dela Cruz as Basilia Tantoco, Genevieve Reyes as Alberta Uitangcoy, and Karl Medina as Jose Rizal. It also features cultural activist Carlos Celdran as a Catholic friar. During a screening of the film in the Philippine Embassy in the Hague, Philippine Ambassador to the Netherlands Jamie Ledda remarked that the events in the film "signifies the strength, character, and capabilities of women in the country's historic struggle for independence."

The letter is one of the works suggested by the Commission of Higher Education to be studied by Philippine college students in the general education core course on Rizal's life and works, alongside his novels Noli Me Tángere and El Filibusterismo.
