= Gorgoria =

Filipino fried dough pastry

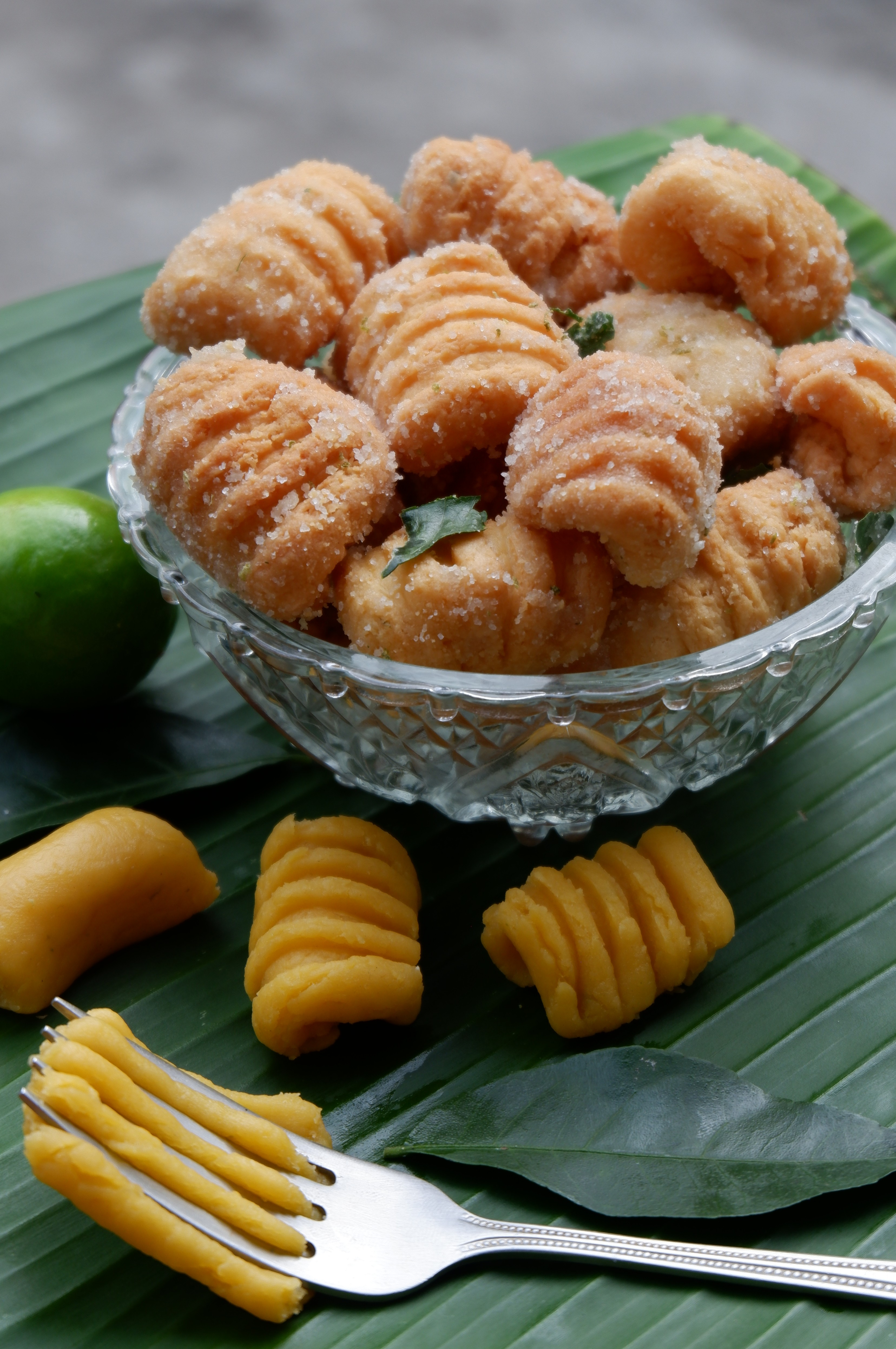
- Alternative names: Gorgorya, Gurgurya, Golloria, Guluria
- Type: Cookies
- Place of origin: Philippines
- Region or state: Malolos, Bulacan

Gorgoria is a crunchy glazed fried dough cookie from the Philippines. It originates from Malolos, Bulacan, and is popular throughout the Tagalog regions of Luzon. It is considered an heirloom recipe and its spread is credited to Alberta Uitangcoy-Santos during the Spanish colonial era of the Philippines. It is also variously spelled as gorgorya, gurgurya, golloria, or guluria among other names.

== History ==
Gorgoria is a very old recipe and has existed since the Spanish colonial era of the Philippines. Its origin and etymology is unknown, but its name may have been derived from Spanish coloría or gloria. The recipe currently used is credited to Alberta Uitangcoy-Santos, from a prominent family in Malolos, Bulacan. She was a women's rights advocate and a reformist leader during the late Spanish and the American colonial period of the Philippines.

Gorgoria is one of the Bulaqueño heirloom recipes preserved by the late food historian Mila Enriquez. Her work is being continued by her niece, Rheeze Santiago-Hernandez.

== Description ==
Gorgoria is a small crunchy cookie that is smooth and glazed on the outside, but is crumbly on the inside. It has a characteristic ridged shell shape.

Gorgoria is made with flour, baking powder, salt, butter or margarine, slightly beaten chicken or duck eggs, and milk. The ingredients are kneaded into a dough and then sliced into small strips of around 1 to 2 inches (2.5 to 5.1 cm) in length. The individual pieces are slid over the back of the tines of a fork to form ridges and then curled into a shell. They are then fried in oil until golden brown and set aside to cool.

The glazing is made from sugar, water, and key lime (dayap) rinds simmered until they melt into a syrup. The fried gorgoria shells are cooked in this syrup briefly until they are completely coated. They are then taken out and allowed to cool.

== See also ==
- Churro
- Tulumba
- Binangkal
- Pilipit
- List of fried dough foods
- List of doughnut varieties
