= Don Catalino Rodriguez Ancestral House =

Don Catalino Rodriguez Ancestral House (Villa Sariaya)
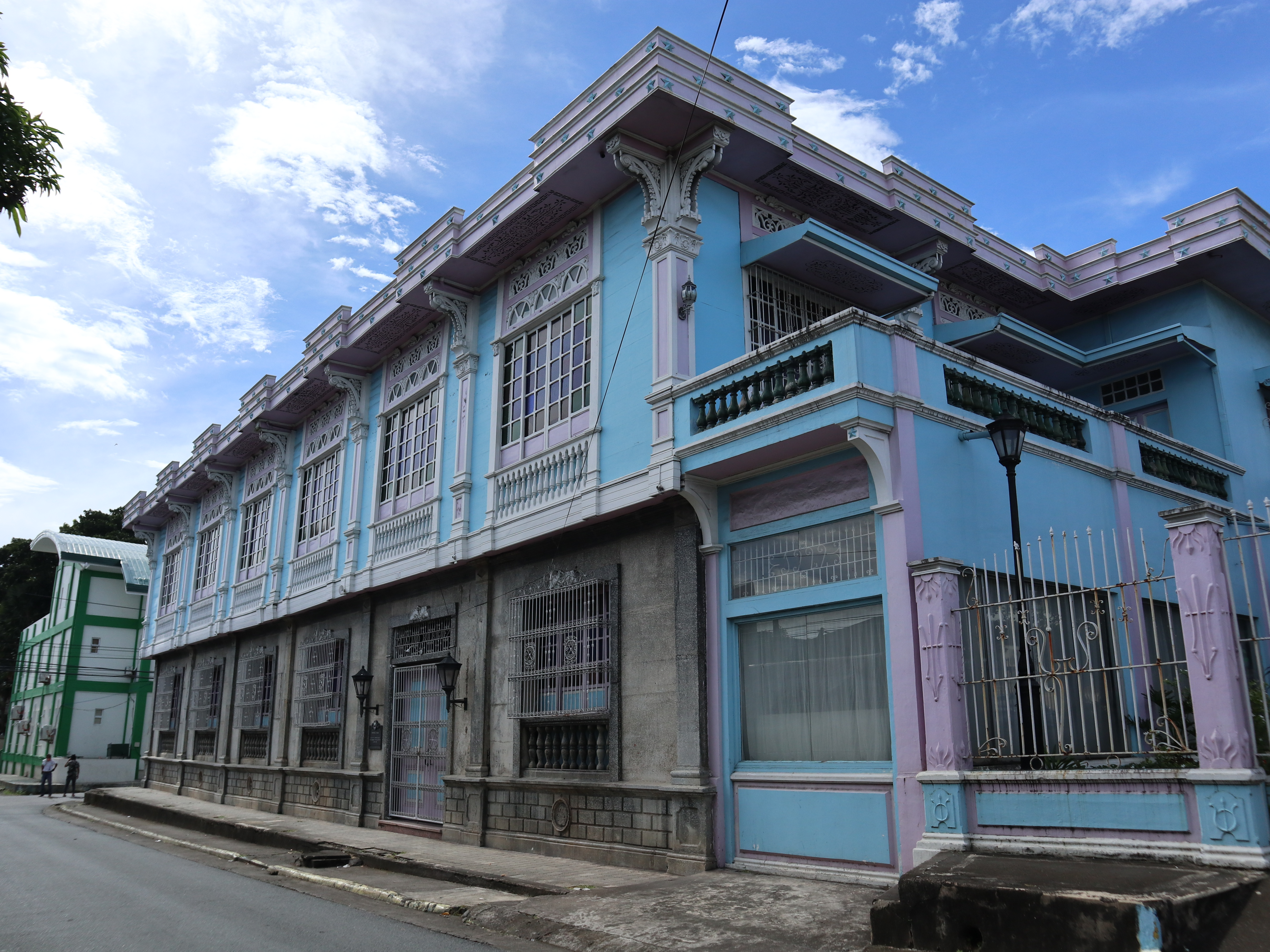
- Don Catalino Rodriguez Ancestral House, also known as Villa Sariaya

Location
- Location: Poblacion, Sariaya, Quezon, (Region IV-A) Philippines
- Interactive map of Don Catalino Rodriguez Ancestral House (Villa Sariaya)
- Coordinates: 13.962939°N 121.525163°E

Architecture
- Style: Bahay na Bato
- Completed: 1922

Website
- www.philippineheritagemap.org

Don Catalino Rodriguez Ancestral House, also known as Villa Sariaya, is one of the three designated heritage houses by the National Historical Commission of the Philippines in Sariaya, Quezon. It was owned by Don Catalino Rodriguez, Sariaya’s town Presidente (Mayor during the American occupation period) from 1908 to 1909. The house occupies an entire block near the church park. Its main entrance faces south along Calle Daliz and is bounded by Calle Rizal on the west and Quezon Avenue (formerly Calle Talavera) on the east. This house has already been converted into a museum.

== History ==
Villa Sariaya was built in 1922. The house was said to be a place for important occasions during its heyday. According to historical accounts, one of those events that were held in the house was in honor of President Manuel Quezon. Claro M. Recto, a native of Tiaong, Quezon, was also mentioned as one of the important guests who visited the house in one of its sponsored events.

In the 1990s, the house was restored to its former grandeur through the effort of Vicente Rodriguez, one of the eight children of the owners. After Vicente Rodriguez, his fourth child Rebecca purchased and restored the house.

Today, Villa Sariaya is owned by the Veloso Family.

== Architectural features ==
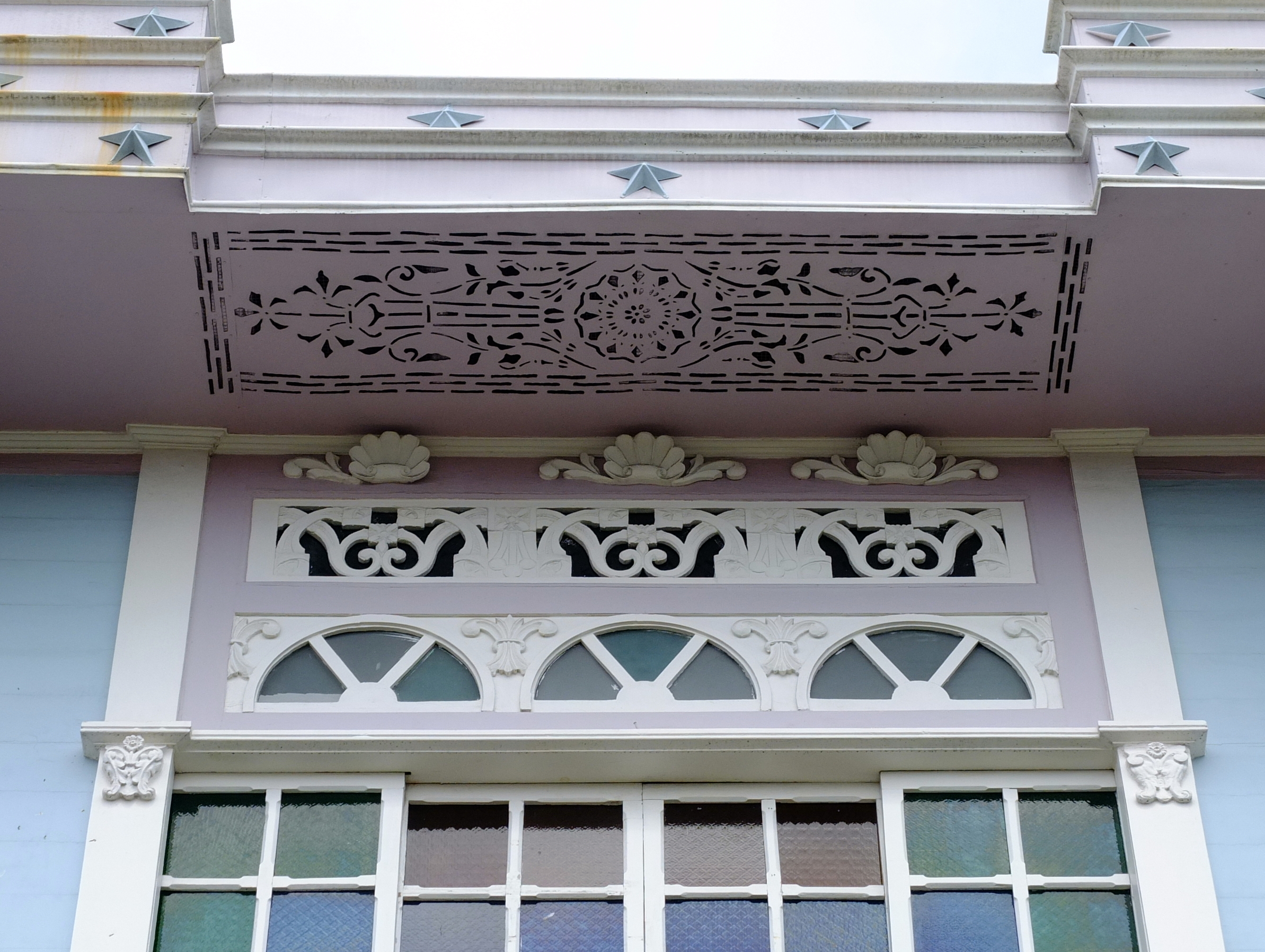
detail of window of Catalino Rodriguez house

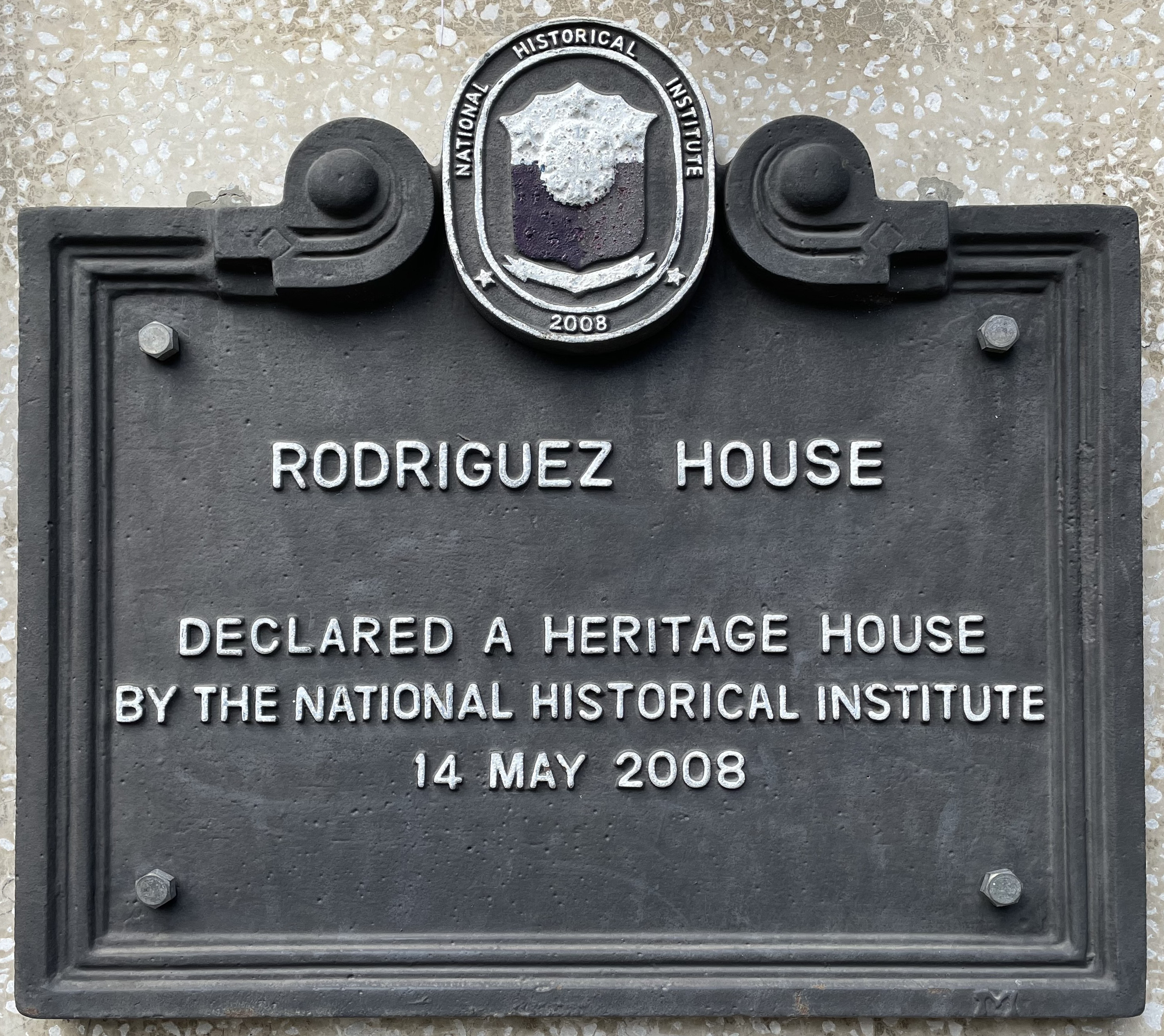
Historical marker

The house was built in the style of Bahay na Bato, a 19th-century townhouse. A bahay na bato, literally translated as stone house, is characterized by stone or brick supported lower level and a hard wooden upper level. From the entrance, the grand staircase with wood balusters is the main feature that greets every visitor. The rooms of the house are finished with beautiful Art Nuoveau wall paintings and wood carvings while the bathrooms were equipped with European and American bathroom fixtures.

The main receiving area on the second floor has high ceiling and is accented by intricately designed lattices. All the big sliding windows of the second floor are decorated with colorful stained glasses with louvered panels. The louvered panels are installed to minimize the entry of sunlight during high noon. At the east side of the house is a big veranda with a picturesque view of the town. To complement the grandiose design of the mansion, original furniture and fixtures were imported from Europe and United States. It is said that expert carpenters from the provinces of Batangas and Pampanga used top-quality species of hardwood in finishing the interiors of the mansion.

At the exterior of the house, intricate carvings decorates the corbels, brackets and pilasters. A simple yet elegant roof parapet decorated with five pointed stars can be seen on the top of the house.

== Gallery ==
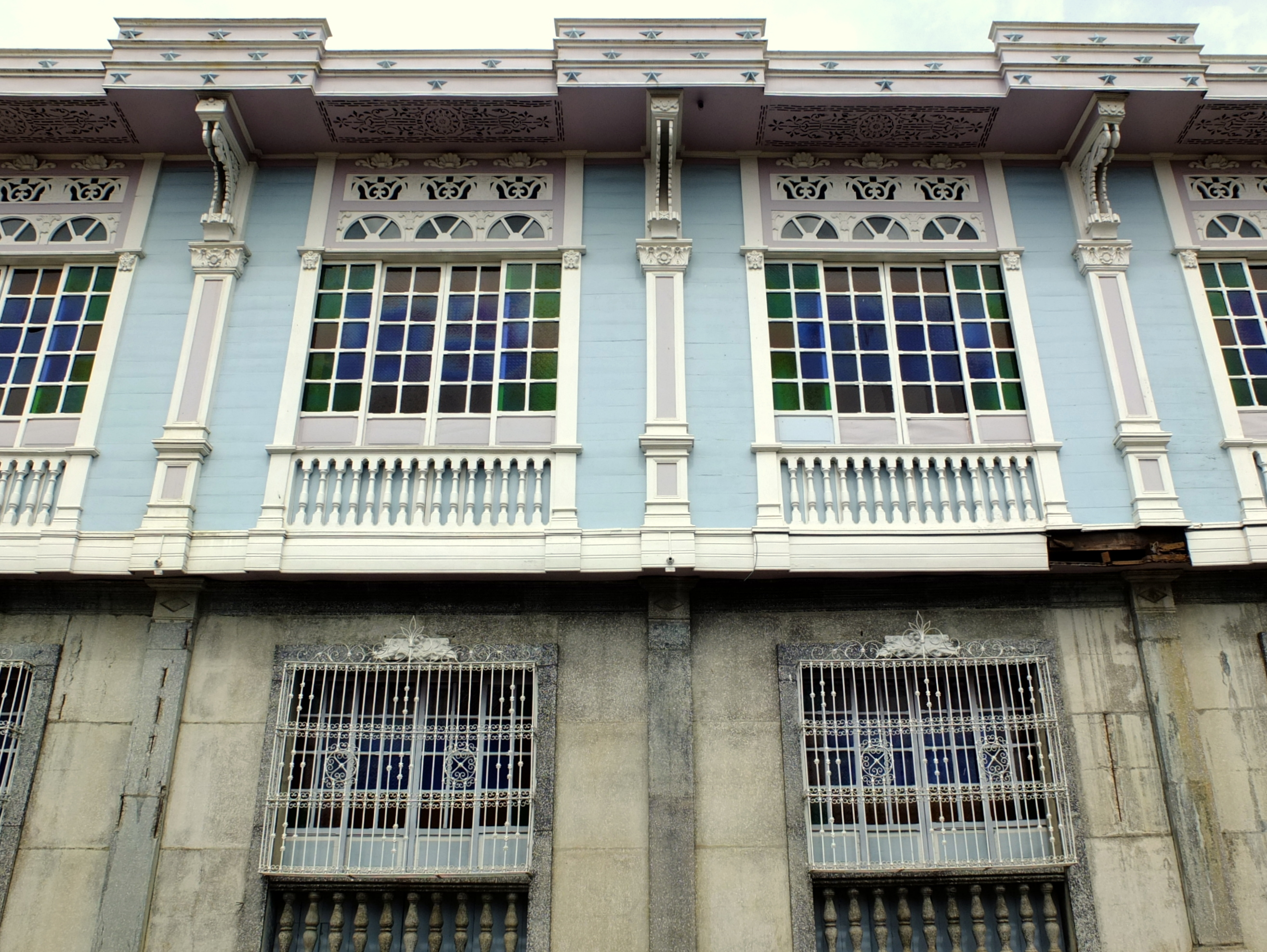
one of the bay facade of Catalino Rodriguez House

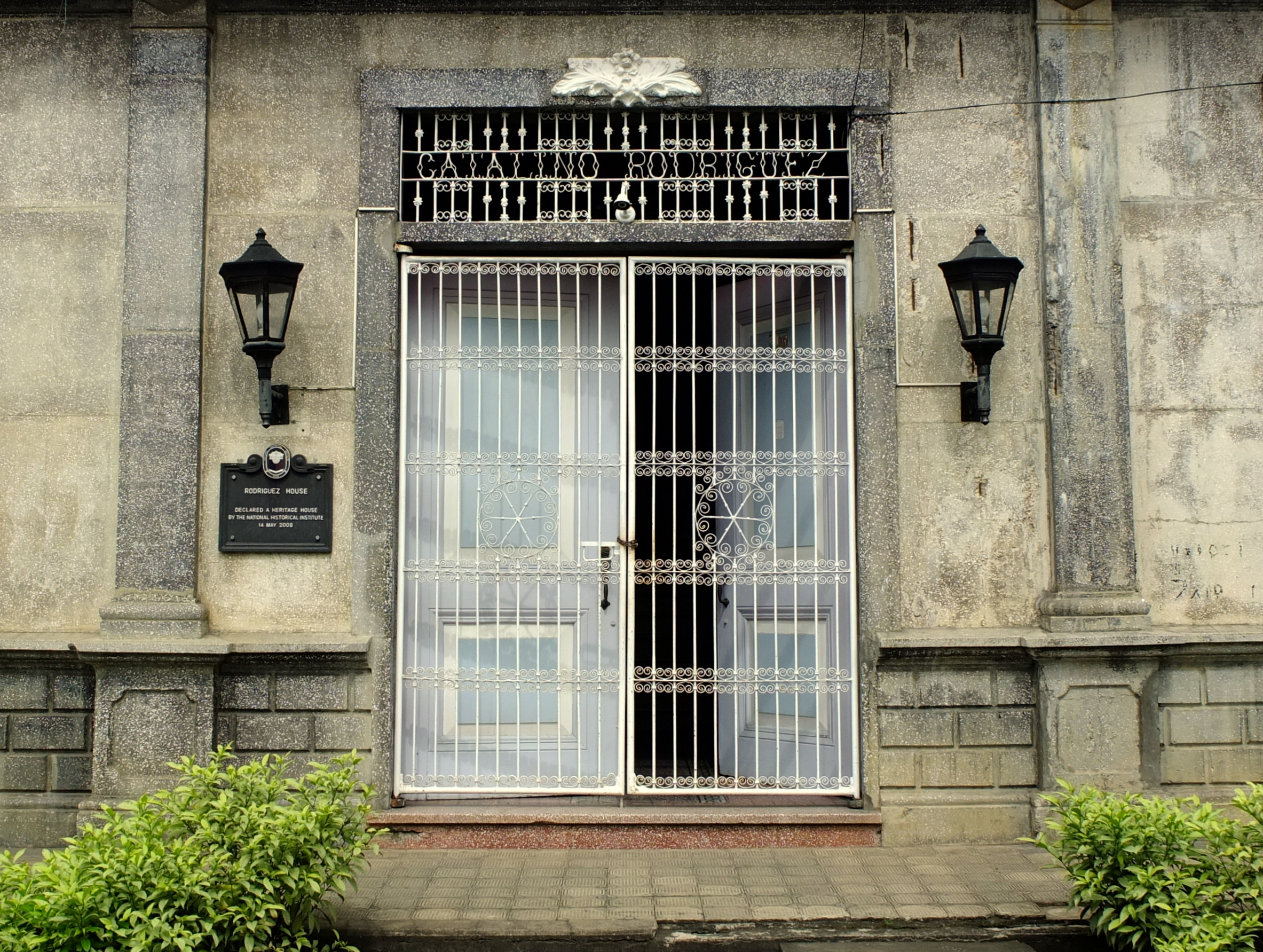
the main entrance of Catalino Rodriguez House

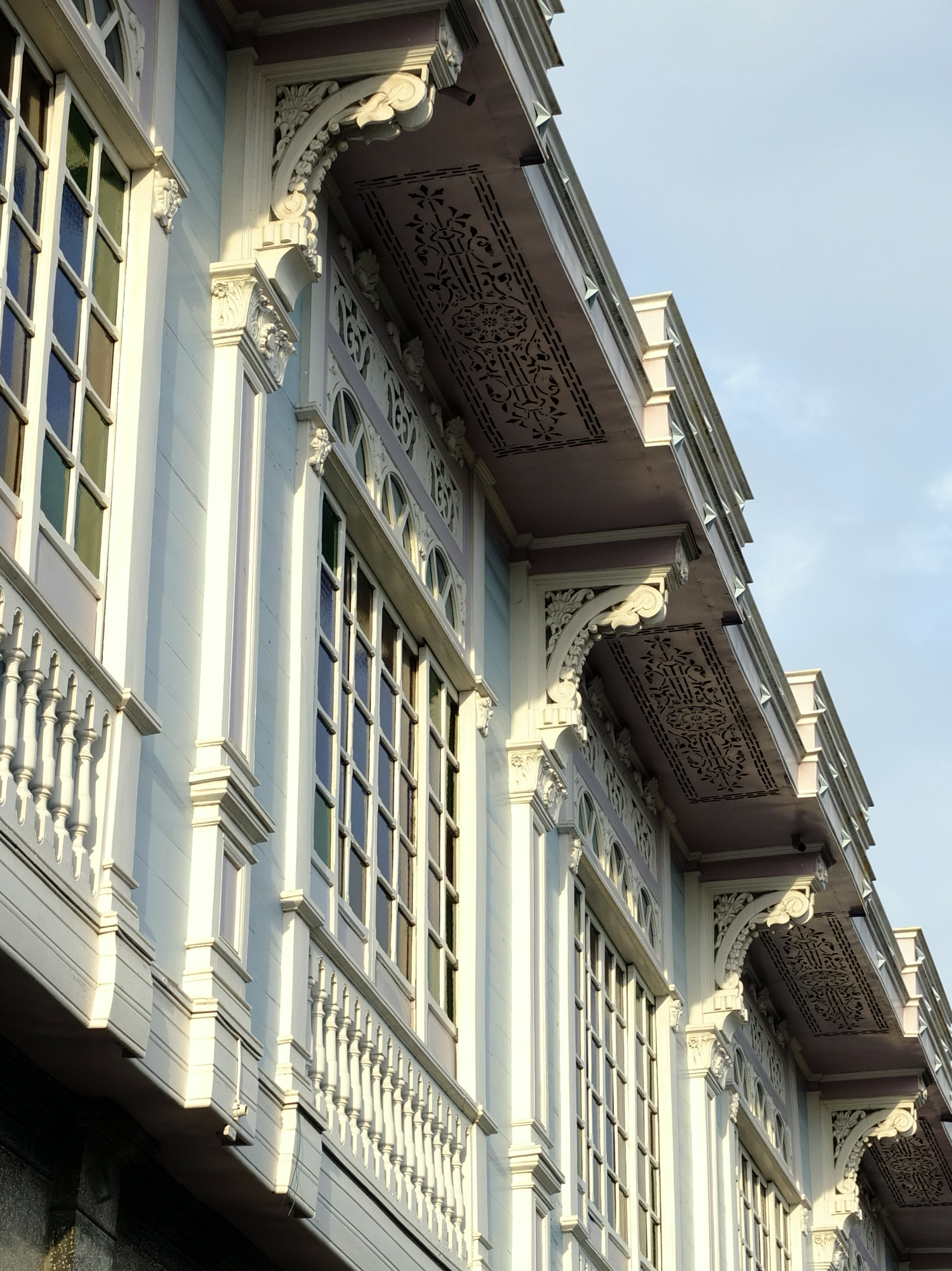
exterior of Catalino Rodriguez house

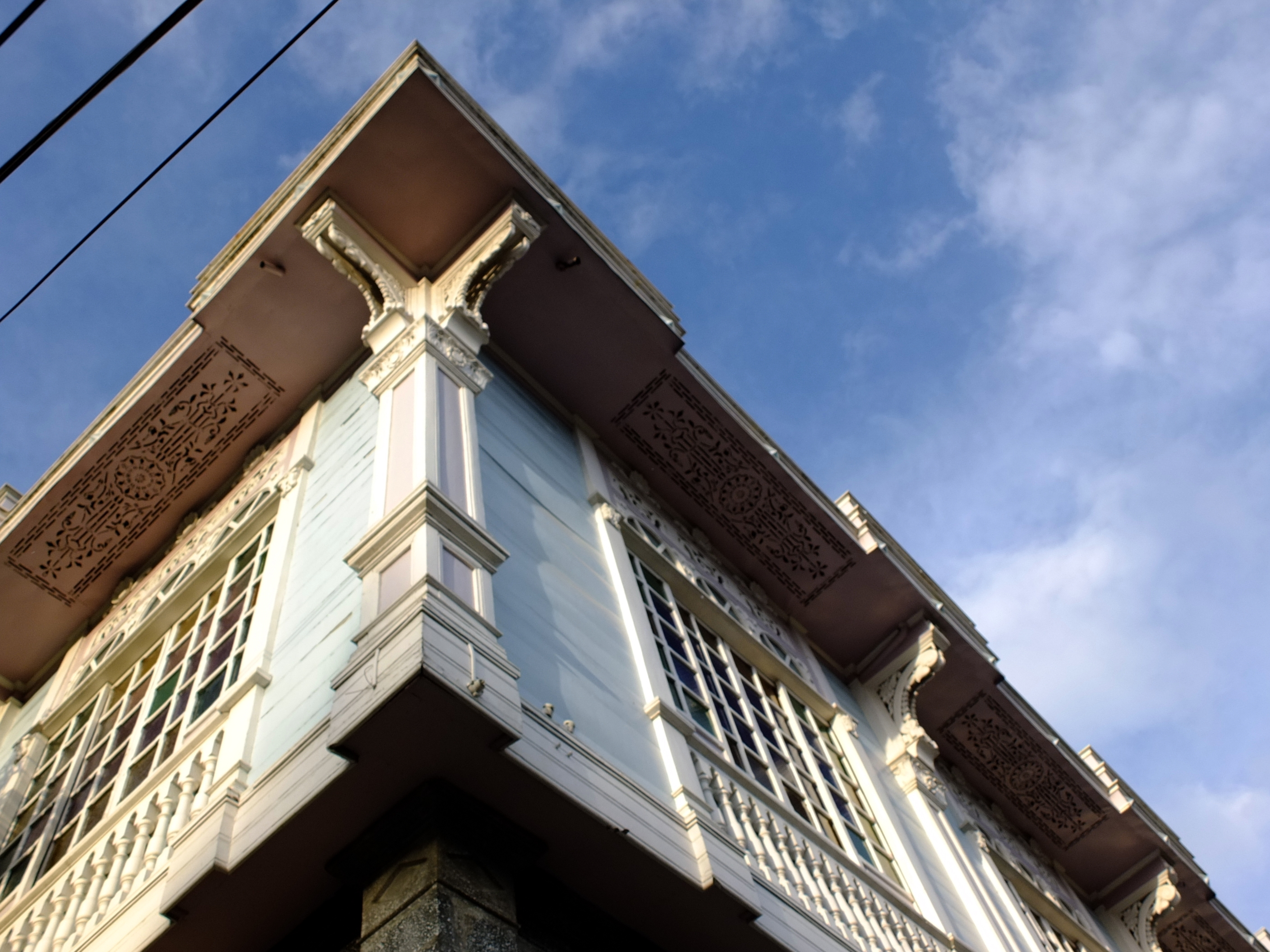
corner shot of Catalino Rodriguez house

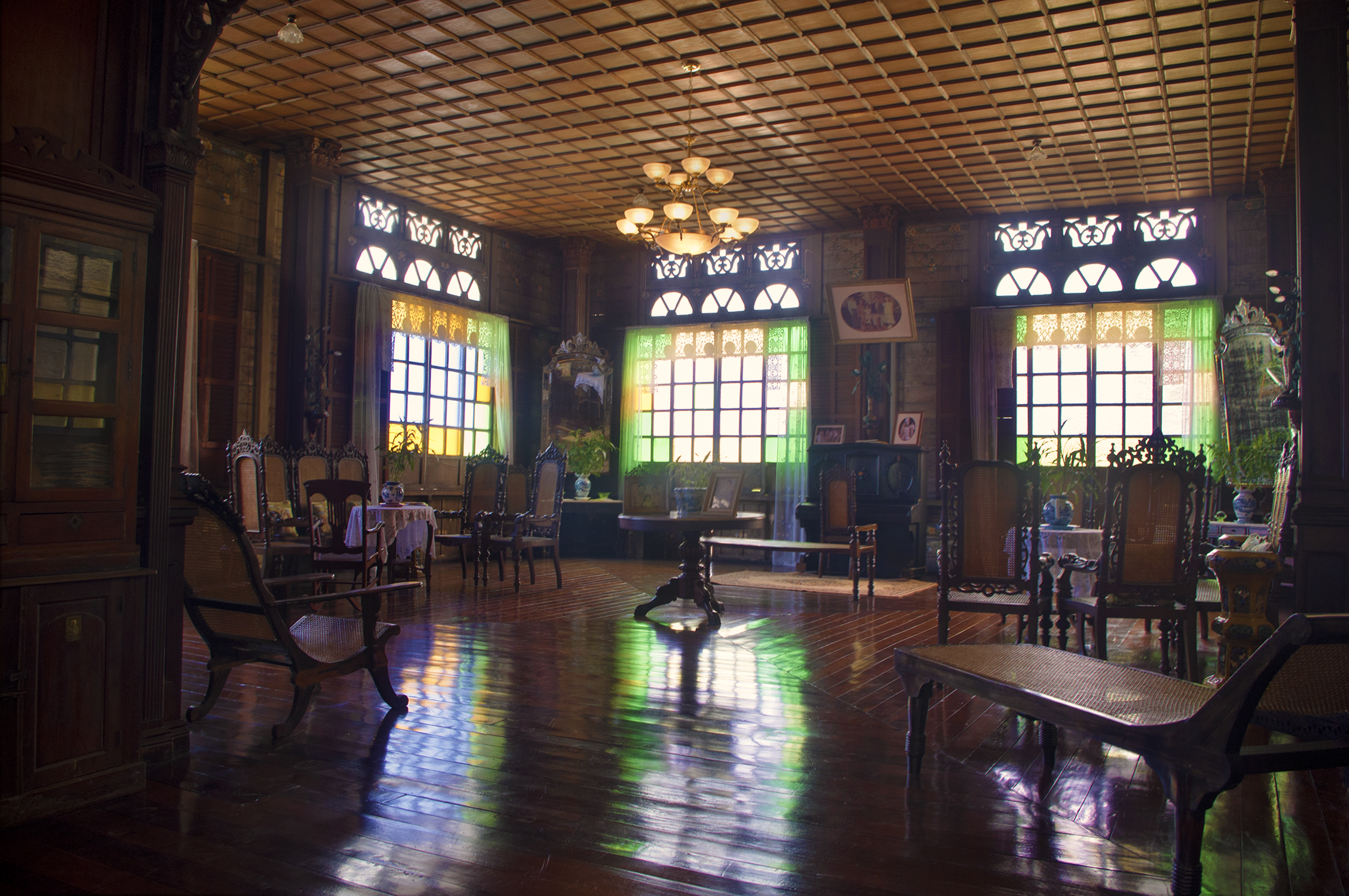
Villa Sariaya Receiving area 2nd floor

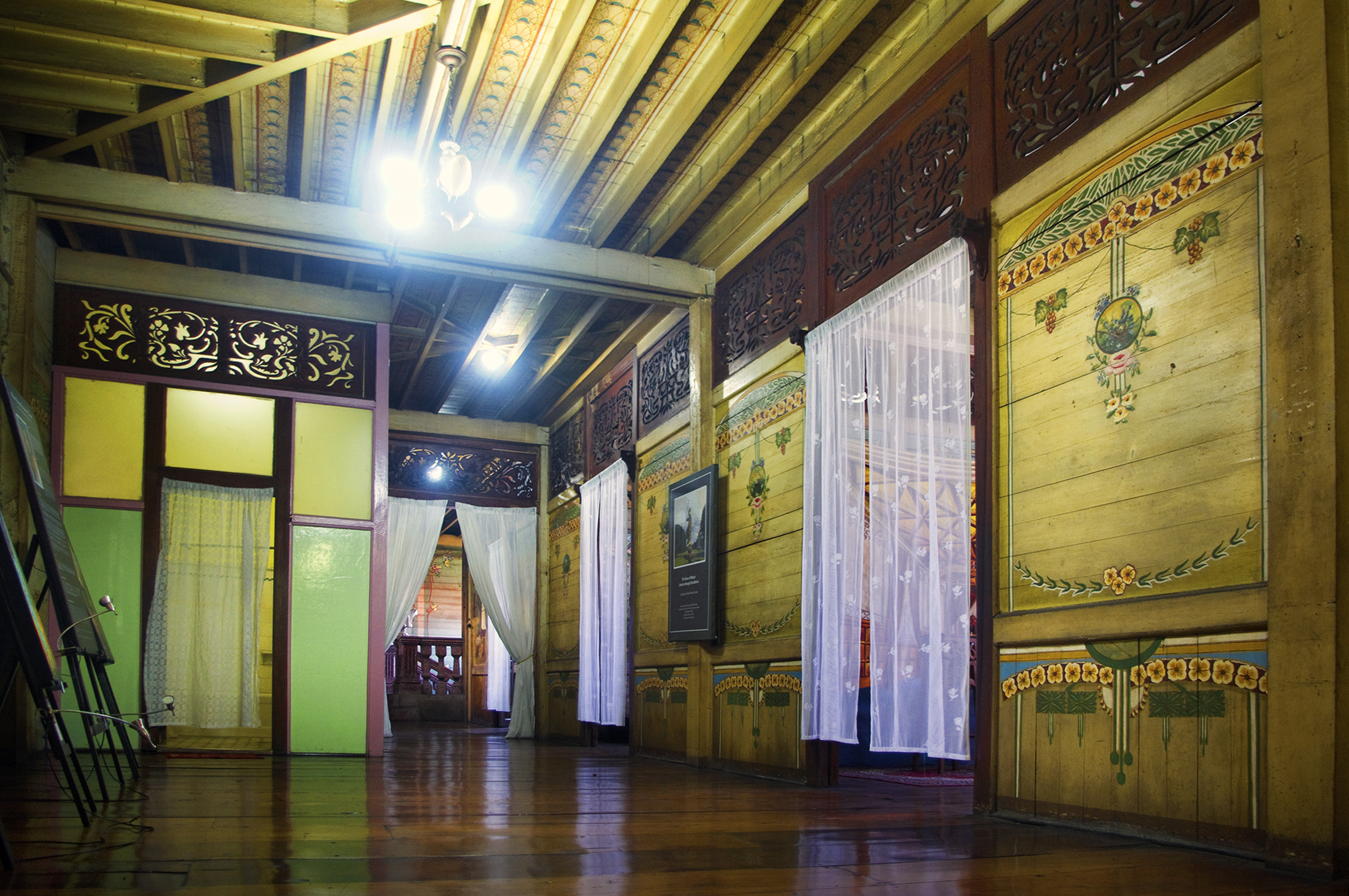
Hallway located on the first floor. It is now used as an Art Gallery.

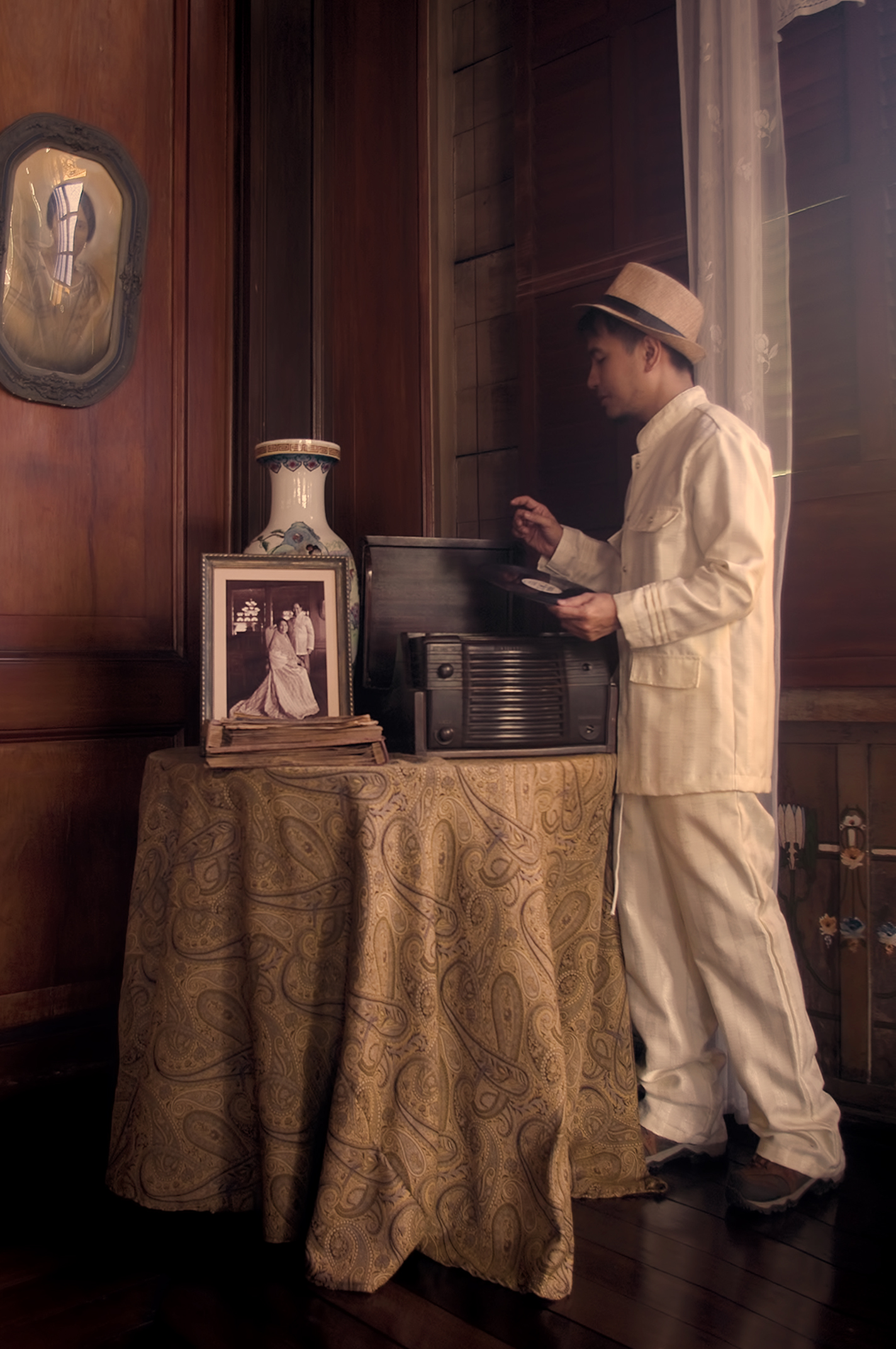
A vintage record player at one corner of the receiving area. Visitors can rent period costumes for a souvenir photo.

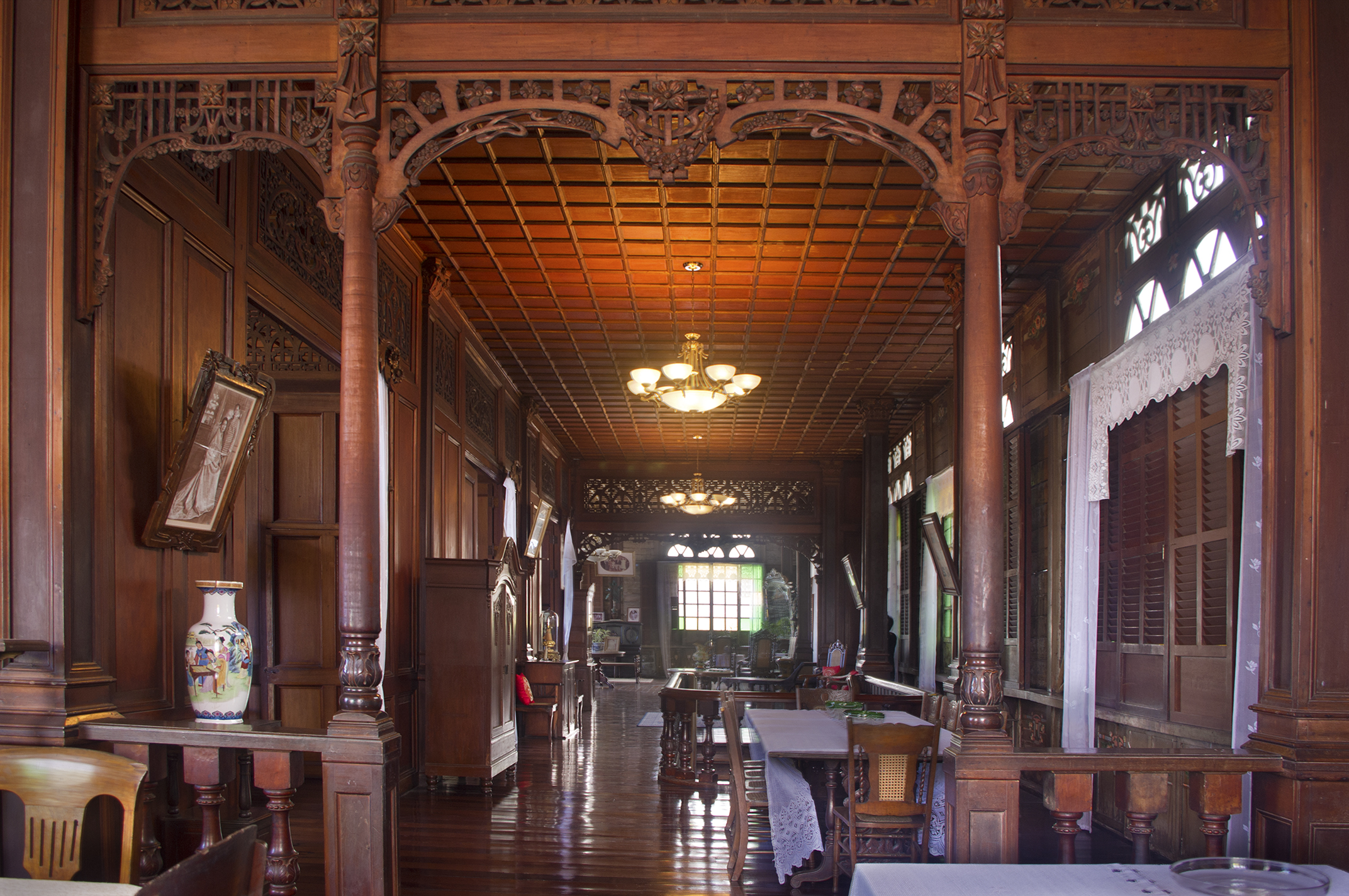
Villa SAriaya-snap shot view from the dining area

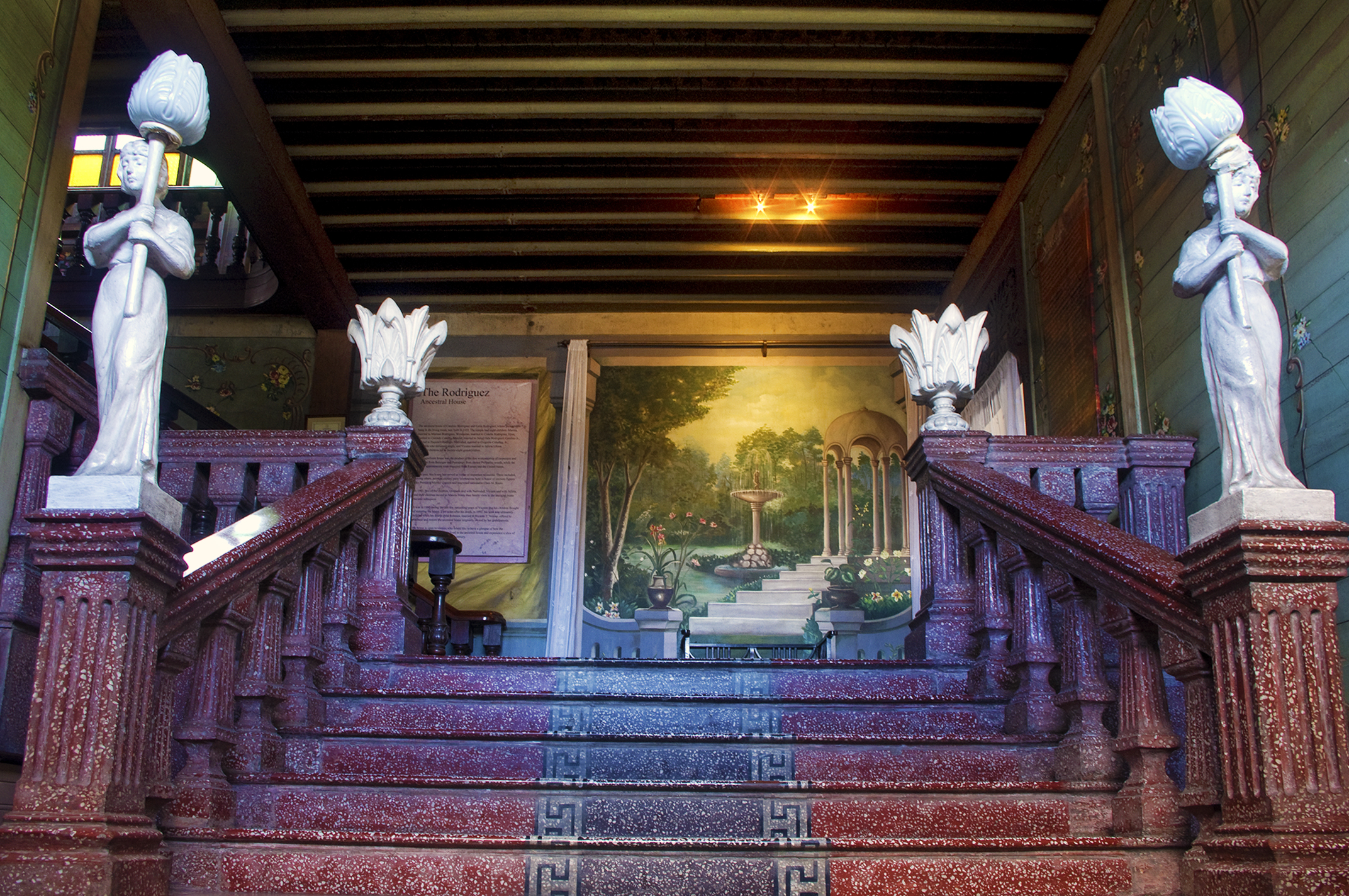
The grand staircase from the main entrance of Villa Sariaya
