= Alberta Uitangcoy-Santos =

Alberta Uitangcoy
- Born: November 20, 1867; Malolos City, Bulacan Province, Captaincy General of the Philippines, Spanish Empire
- Died: June 1, 1953 (aged 87); Philippines
- Organization(s): Women of Malolos; Philippine Red Cross; Asociacion Feminista de Filipinas
- Known for: Leading The Women of Malolos in the fight for women's education during the Spanish colonization of the Philippines
- Spouse: Paulino Reyes Santos
- Children: Alfredo, Luis, Salome, Josefa, Gonzalo, Trinidad, Jose, Luisa, Elisa
- Parent(s): Jose Uitangcoy; Antonia Santos

Alberta Uitangcoy-Santos (November 20, 1867 – June 1, 1953) was the leader of The Women of Malolos, and is revered for her contributions to Philippine women's rights, the fight for Philippine independence, and a large part of the traditional cuisine of the city of Malolos, Bulacan, in the Philippines during the Spanish and American colonial periods. She is known as the matriarch of the Uitangcoy-Santos House, which has been declared a national heritage house by the National Historical Commission of the Philippines, and currently houses the Museum of the Women of Malolos which is now curated by her fifth-generation grandson, Carlo Herrera.

== Early life ==
Alberta Santos Uitangcoy was born in Malolos, Bulacan on November 20, 1867. Her father, Jose Uitangcoy, was a mestizo sangley originally from Binondo district of Manila. Her mother, Antonia Santos, was from a major clan of Malolos. After finishing primary school in a local school for girls, Alberta studied at the Colegio de la Concordia in Manila, where she learned Christian doctrine, with some reading and writing.

== Women of Malolos ==
On December 12, 1888, Uitangcoy and a group of young and affluent women from Malolos signed and presented a petition written by reformist Teodoro Sandico addressed to Governor General Valeriano Weyler. The petition asked for the Governor General's permission to allow the women to establish a night school where they could learn Spanish and other academic subjects. It was Uitangcoy who handed the petition to the Governor General while the other women fended off the Spanish friars who were furious and wanted to know what was in the letter. Ultimately, the women won the lengthy battle for approval despite staunch opposition from the friar curate.

After hearing of the women's victory, reformist leaders Marcelo H. del Pilar and Graciano Lopez Jaena wrote about the women in the Filipino liberal publication La Solidaridad. Jose Rizal followed suit in his letter Mga Kababayang Dalaga ng Malolos to the group on February 22, 1889, wherein he lauded their brave efforts towards reform.

== Later life ==
Alberta Santos Uitangcoy was introduced to her husband Paulino Reyes Santos, a landowner, through her cousin Lino Santos Reyes. They married in Malolos on July 13, 1889. At the time, Santos was serving as a cabeza de barangay. They would have nine children together before Santos' death in 1927.

During the Philippine Revolution, several of the Women of Malolos, including Uitangcoy, joined 160 other Filipino women to become founding members of the Cruz Roja ("Red Cross"). They were led by Hilaria del Rosario, the wife of the first Philippine President Emilio Aguinaldo. The association was officially recognized by Aguinaldo on February 16, 1899. The Cruz Roja would later become the Philippine Red Cross during the Commonwealth era.

After the establishment of the American Insular Government, in 1906, Uitangcoy participated in the establishment of the local Pariancillo chapter of the Asociacion Femenista de Filipinas, the first women's organization in the Philippines. Including Uitangcoy, ten of the Women of Malolos joined the organization.

== Culinary legacy ==
Uitangcoy is also known for her great contributions to traditional Malolos cuisine. She crafted and taught several of the town's heralded recipes to the younger women of Malolos, specifically her niece Socorro and town bakers like Salome Ramos, who later popularized them throughout Malolos via her establishment, La Concepcion Bakery.

Uitangcoy is credited for crafting the ensaymada that does not use water but lard instead, pastillas de leche made from carabao milk, empanada de kaliskis (an empanada with an outer-cover that is molded to resemble fish scales), suspiros de pili, mazapan de pili, and gorgoria.

Uitangcoy and the women were also popular for crafting intricate wrappers for their pastillas de leche, using papel de japon (Japanese paper) and a very small pair of scissors. Her surviving works can be found in the dining exhibit hall of the Museum of the Women of Malolos, which also hosts an interactive food-tasting exhibit of her recipes prepared by Malolos locals for the museum's patrons.
