= Uitangcoy-Santos House =

Historical and lifestyle museum in Bulacan, Philippines

Museum of the Women of Malolos
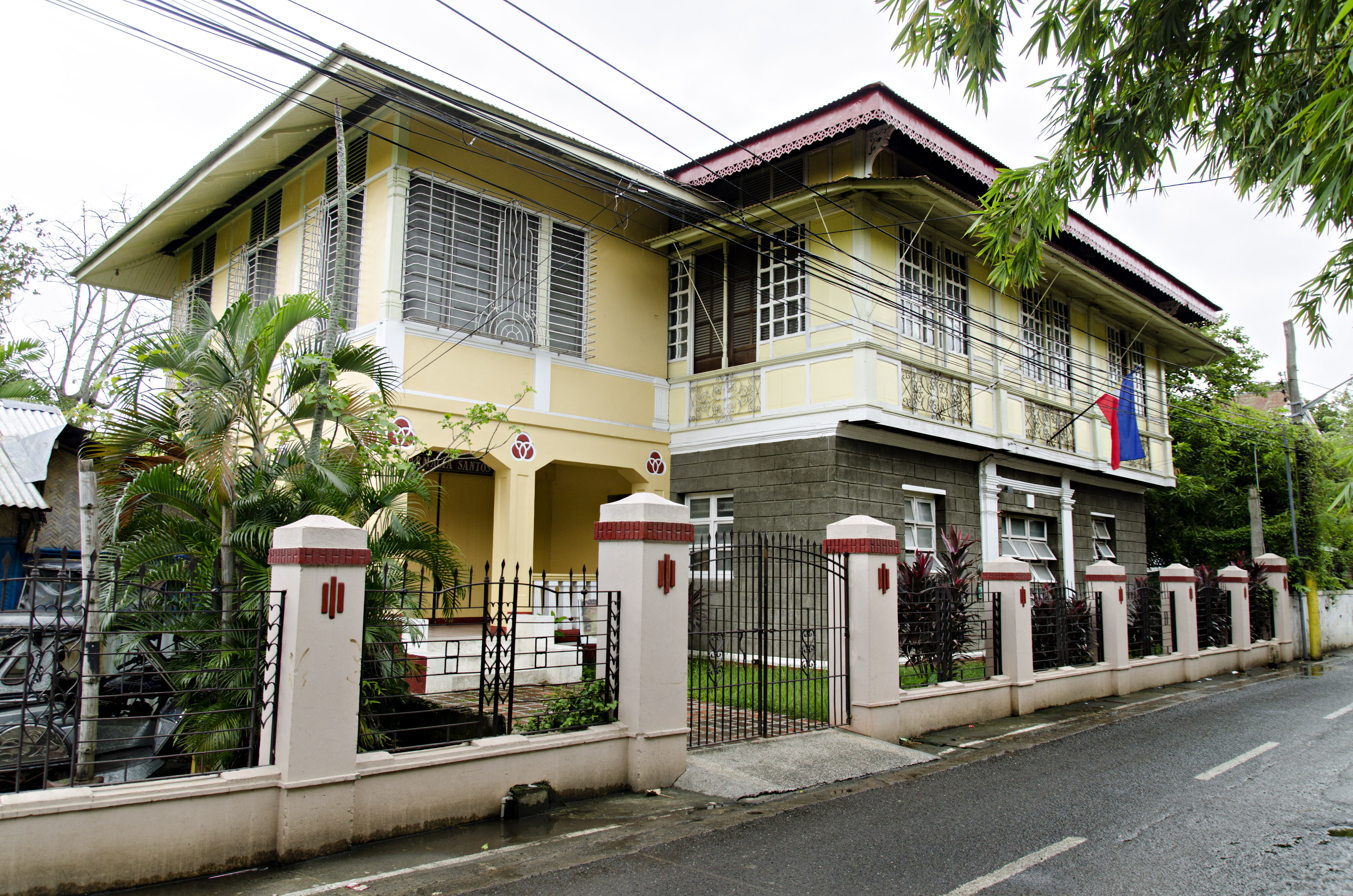
- Established: 14 April 2013
- Coordinates: 14°50′29″N 120°48′38″E
- Type: Historical and lifestyle museum
- Curator: Carlo Herrera
- Building details
- Alternative names: Uitangcoy-Santos House

General information
- Type: House
- Architectural style: Bahay na Bato
- Location: FT Reyes Street, Malolos, Bulacan, Philippines
- Construction started: 1914

Technical details
- Material: Stone; Concrete; Wood; Steel

The Uitangcoy-Santos House (also known as the Museum of the Women of Malolos) is an early 20th-Century bay-na-bato structure along FT Reyes Street (formerly known as Calle Electricidad) in Barangay Sto. Nino, in the city of Malolos, Bulacan, in the Republic of the Philippines. The home belonged to Paulino Santos—a Propetario and Cabeza de Barangay, and Alberta Uitangcoy-Santos—who was the leader of The Women of Malolos, and is revered for her contributions to Philippine women's rights, the fight for Philippine independence, and a large part of Malolos' traditional cuisine during the Spanish and American colonial periods. The Uitangcoy-Santos House has been declared a national heritage house by the National Historical Commission of the Philippines, and is currently a privately owned museum that houses four exhibit halls and a lecture hall. The museum currently showcases collections of surviving artifacts and other memorabilia relevant to the narrative of the women and the Uitangcoy-Santos family.

The house was built and completed in 1914, after the original 1890 structure was destroyed by a fire in 1910.

The Uitangcoy-Santos House is currently owned by Josefa Santos-Tibajia and Lourdes Santos-Herrera, granddaughters of Paulino Santos and Alberta Uitangcoy-Santos, and is under the care of the non-profit organization, the Women of Malolos Foundation Inc, which spearheaded initial efforts of restoration through their "Own a Piece of History, Adopt a Heritage House" project.

On 14 April 2013, the house turned into museum opened its doors to the public through a soft launch that was attended mostly by members of the Women of Malolos Foundation and descendants of the 20 women.

The museum closed temporarily on 18 January 2017, after Carlo Herrera, a fifth-generation grandson of Alberta Uitangcoy, and then a senior Art Management student specializing in heritage curation and preservation at the Ateneo de Manila University, found that the conditions of the museum and its exhibits were unsatisfactory after a visit to his family's estate. After creating a blueprint for its restructuring, Herrera was named head curator of the museum by the owners and the usufructuary, then began work on the estate by conducting physical repairs, restoring and preserving all the decaying articles in the museum, re-curating the entire collection, and opening more exhibit halls after clearing out debris stuffed in the home.

On 12 March 2017, Herrera reopened the museum with a newly furnished and restored interior, along with world-class preservation units. Herrera launched a new tour program which he had produced and conducted himself for the museum and estate. The tours included a comprehensive lecture, visits to all four exhibit halls and two other heritage structures, and an interactive food-tasting exhibit of Alberta Uitangcoy's recipes prepared by Malolos locals. Tickets to the tours were sold via Herrera's website throughout February 2017, and were sold out in three weeks.

== The Women of Malolos ==
The Women of Malolos were a group of young and affluent Mestiza-Sangley women who are most remembered for spearheading a petition written by notable reformist Teodoro Sandico, for women's education towards the latter portion of the Spanish colonial period in the Philippines.

On 12 December 1888, led by Uitangcoy, the young women from the Kamistisuhan District of Malolos signed and presented the petition to Governor General Valeriano Weyler, asking for his permission to allow them to establish a night school where they can learn Spanish and other academic subjects. It was Uitangcoy who handed the petition to the Governor General while the other women fended off the Spanish Friars who were furious and wanted to know what was in the letter. Ultimately, the women won the lengthy battle for approval despite staunch opposition from the friar curate.

After hearing of the women's victory, reformist leaders Marcelo H. del Pilar and Graciano Lopez Jaena wrote about the women in the Filipino liberal publication, La Solidaridad.

Dr. Jose Rizal followed suit in his letter "Sulat sa mga Kadalagahang Taga-Malolos" to the group on 22 February 1889, wherein he lauded their brave efforts towards reform.

During the Philippine revolution against Spain and as the hostilities between Filipinos and Americans broke out, a number of the women aided revolutionaries who fought against both the Spanish and American colonizers through their roles in establishing the Cruz Roja (Philippine Red Cross) and passing letters and communications hidden in their dresses. During the American colonization, ten of the twenty women participated in establishing the Pariancillo chapter (one of the five barrio committees that comprised the local Malolos, Bulacan committee) of the Asociacion Feminista de Filipinas, which aimed to tackle several women's rights issues of the day.
