= Mariveles Church =

Roman Catholic church in Bataan, Philippines

- Diocesan Shrine and Parish Church of Saint Nicholas Tolentine
- Saint Nicholas of Tolentino Parish Church
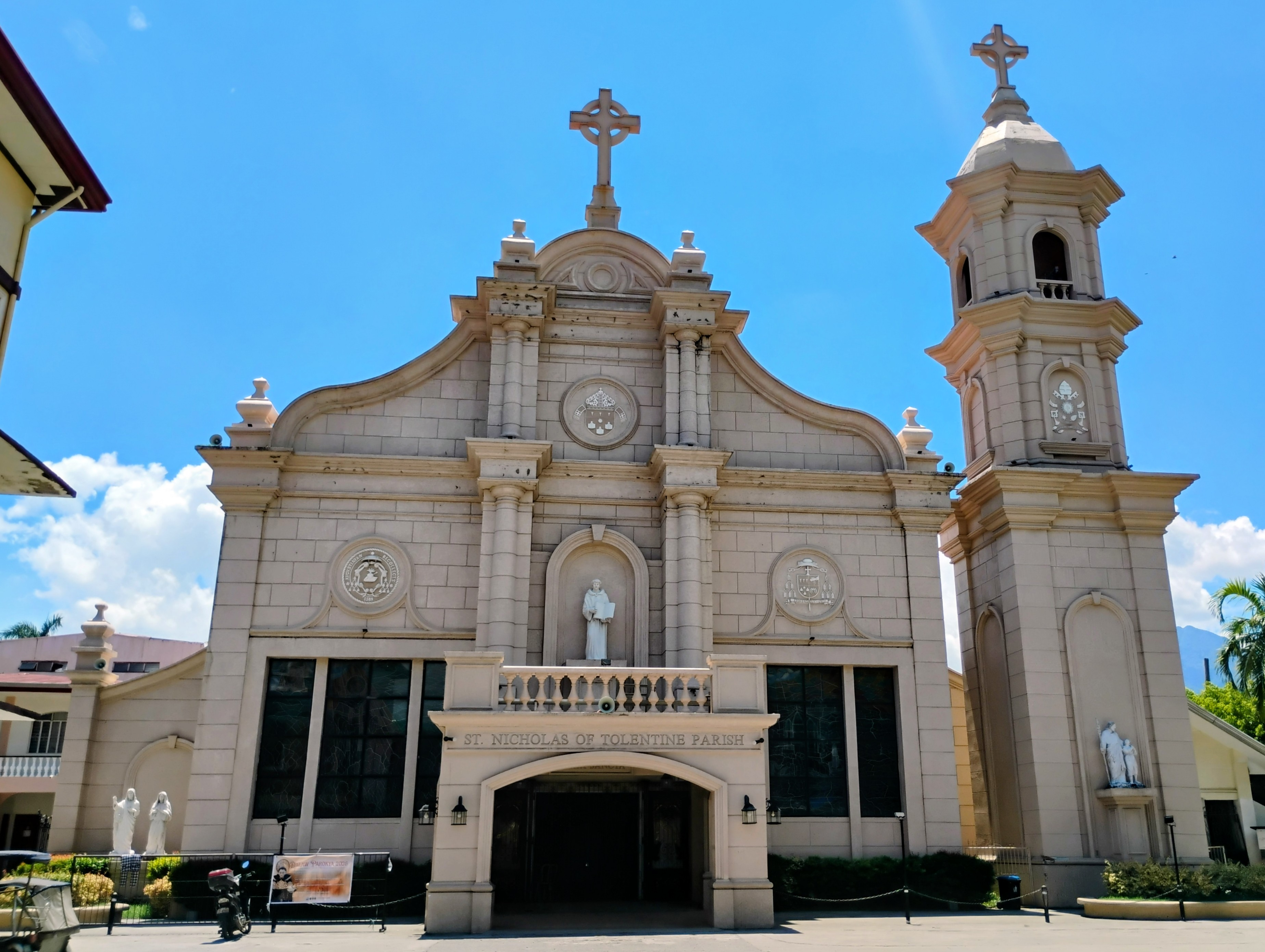
- Church facade in 2026

- Location in Luzon Location in the Philippines
- 14°26′06″N 120°29′08″E
- Location: Mariveles, Bataan
- Country: Philippines
- Denomination: Roman Catholic
- Website: Facebook page

History
- Status: Diocesan shrine Parish church
- Founded: 1729; 297 years ago
- Dedication: Nicholas of Tolentino

Architecture
- Functional status: Active
- Architectural type: Church building

Administration
- Division: Vicariate of St. Michael the Archangel
- Province: San Fernando
- Metropolis: San Fernando
- Archdiocese: San Fernando
- Diocese: Balanga

Clergy
- Archbishop: Florentino G. Lavarias
- Bishop: Rufino C. Sescon, Jr.
- Priest: Regin L. Tenorio

The Diocesan Shrine and Parish Church of Saint Nicholas Tolentine, commonly known as Mariveles Church, is a Roman Catholic church located in Mariveles, Bataan, Philippines. The church is dedicated to the Italian saint Nicholas of Tolentino. It is under the jurisdiction of the Diocese of Balanga (Vicariate of St. Michael the Archangel). Since June 5, 2023, Fr. Regin L. Tenorio is the Rector and Parish Priest of the church. The parish church's feast day is September 10 and Catholic population is 36,282.

== History ==
Mariveles was founded as a pueblo by a Franciscan Friar in 1578. Mariveles, the "Village of Camaya" was part of the Corregimiento of Mariveles, including Bagac and Morong, Corregidor and Maragondon, Cavite. The name Mariveles comes from "Maria Velez", a Mexican nun who eloped with a monk back in 1600s. With its natural cove, the port was used by ships from China and Spain to resupply. The Augustinian Recollects missionaries constructed the first church in 1729.

During World War II, the original church was destroyed, resulting in the loss of its records. The second structure was then constructed and used until it demolished to give way to the third current structure.

== Parish church history ==
The parish's current structure was started by the late Msgr. Antonio Tony S. Dumaual and finished construction by Fr. Josue V. Enero in the late 1980s. When the current structure was finished, the facade had brown bricks design, multi-colored rectangular stained glasses, a door with large alpha and omega symbols, and the ceiling inside originally had dark brown color.

To celebrate the Great Jubilee in 2000, the parish church's doors was changed to the one with the Jubilee 2000 logo under the leadership of Fr. Abraham SP. Pantig. A statue of Jesus Christ and its pedestal was also added creating a rotonda at the church's exterior. Also, the bricks design part and ceiling interior were added with white paint.

During the leadership of Fr. Percival V. Medina in 2004, the church's stained glass was changed to the one depicting St. Nicholas with people in hellfire, a Bataan Death March marker, and the church itself. The following year in 2005, the projector used to display the presentation was changed from overhead to the one connecting into a laptop which modernized the parish's visuals and presentations. On September 9, 2005 during Medina's final months as rector and parish priest, Mariveles celebrated the 276th anniversary of Apo Kulas, the Patron Saint of Mariveles — San Nicolas de Tolentino, who arrived in this town through the Order of Augustinian Recoletos missionaries. Thus, the parish was founded in 1729 bearing the name of the saint.

Under the leadership of Msgr. Hipolito Araña who served for most of the 2005–2011 term of the Diocese of Balanga from October 22, 2005 to July 2009, the floor at the left and right side was smoothened by placing a white smooth flooring over their rough surface. It was also during Araña's tenure that the stations of the cross on a frame were bought, landscaping the church's exterior by adding grass outside, and added the parish's history outside the church. In 2008, the former wall at the right side of an altar was removed moving a choir loft to its current location and a part where the loft was formerly located is now occupied by chairs used by worshippers while at the left was to give way for more space of chairs and the former St. Nicholas Catholic School of Mariveles when it was under the supervision of the parish was now the room for saints and Our Lady of Perpetual Help, its facade and the sacristy were painted with yellow, and the chairs changed their color from dark brown to light brown. Under the two-year fill-in leadership of Msgr. Hernando Guanzon from July 2009 to June 5, 2011, the statue of Jesus Christ was moved at the left side of the church and its pedestal added during Pantig's tenure as rector and parish priest near the church's facade was removed on late 2010, restoring the church's spacious outside. An iron fence was also added at the front of a church. At its interior, walls at the left side of an altar was restored to give way for a sacristy.

Changes to the parish church during Fr. Felizardo Sevilla's during the diocese's second 6-years term from June 5, 2011, to June 5, 2017, are the lecterns were changed to wood and became movable, facade became pink in late 2012 which is its current color since then, tiles were added on the floor of the church's interior, gates at the left and right side of the church were changed, ceiling fan was added which removed the two chandeliers, retablo became wood, and ceiling above the altar was changed and added a ray pattern design. In late 2014, televisions were started to be used to display presentations, replacing a projector used to connect on a laptop that has been in use for nine years since the tenure of Rev. Fr. Percival V. Medina in 2005.

On late 2019 during the tenure of Fr. Gerry Jorge, livestreaming or videos of masses were introduced and was later adapted on televisions at the term of Bishop Ruperto Santos (who was then fourth Bishop of Balanga) as the church's parish administrator. Livestreams were also posted on Facebook to accommodate people who are not able to go to church physically but only on that day and for archive purposes. He also planned for the change of the church's facade and added a belfry with the new automated bell from Royal Bells Philippines implemented by Santos when he became an administrator.

During the three-year tenure of Bishop Ruperto Santos as administrator from June 5, 2020 to June 4, 2023, he implemented components previously planned by Fr. Gerry Jorge on a facade part, changed the Stations of the Cross inside the church, lecterns and a comfort room, a design and brown color was added on a ray pattern ceiling design above the altar, and more images were added within the church such as Saints Rita of Cascia and Monica. Grass, plants, and iron fence that were present since the terms of Msgrs. Hipolito Araña and Hernando Guanzon were also removed to give way for a round cement chair for the public as well as even restoring more the church's spacious outside. The parish church received the relics of St. Nicholas of Tolentino. Santos consecrated the church on August 10, 2022 which added candle holders at the church's posts and then declared as a diocesan shrine on February 25, 2023.

Under the current leadership of Fr. Regin L. Tenorio since June 5, 2023, its logo as a shrine was revealed. Renovation of the sacristy, and the addition of stained-glass featuring St. Nicholas and design at the ceiling's brown part were made. The renovated sacristy was blessed on September 5, 2023, during the 5th day of Novena for the patron saint's feast day on September 10 by the Archbishop of San Fernando, Pampanga and Apostolic Administrator of the Diocese of Balanga Florentino Lavarias. Projects that were previously planned by Santos that were made under Tenorio's leadership are the new confessional and fence, and landscaping the church's exterior all previously planned by Santos. The cross' lights of the church's facade was changed from orange made by Santos to blue. In 2024, life-sized saints and bricks on the pedestals were added outside the church, and a garage was demolished to give way for another comfort room. The chairs reverted back to their dark brown color while also added the cross design at their sides and making the tip rounder in 2026.

== Rectors and Parish Priests, and Parish Administrators ==
=== Archdiocese of San Fernando era (December 11, 1948 – November 8, 1975) ===
- Rev. Fr. Apolonio Y. Mallari (1971 – November 8, 1975)

=== Diocese of Balanga era (November 8, 1975 – present) ===
- Rev. Fr. Apolonio Y. Mallari (November 8, 1975 – 1976)
- Rev. Msgr. Antonio S. Dumaual (1976 – 1982)
- Rev. Msgr. Romeo Banaban (1982 – 1986)
- Rev. Fr. Josue V. Enero (1986 – September 1994)
- Rev. Fr. Abraham SP. Pantig (September 1994 – August 4, 2002)
- Rev. Fr. Percival V. Medina (August 4, 2002 – October 22, 2005)

==== During the 6-years term of the Diocese of Balanga (October 22, 2005 – present) ====
- 2005–2011: Rev. Msgr. Hipolito S. Araña (October 22, 2005 – July 2009) and Hernando B. Guanzon (July 2009 – June 5, 2011)
- 2011–2017: Rev. Fr. Felizardo D. Sevilla (June 5, 2011 – June 5, 2017)
- 2017–2023: Rev. Fr. Gerry P. Jorge (June 5, 2017 – June 5, 2020) and Most Rev. Ruperto Santos (Parish Administrator and Fourth Bishop of Balanga from April 1, 2010 to July 22, 2023; June 5, 2020 – June 4, 2023)
- 2023–present: Rev. Fr. Regin L. Tenorio (June 5, 2023 – present)

== Gallery ==
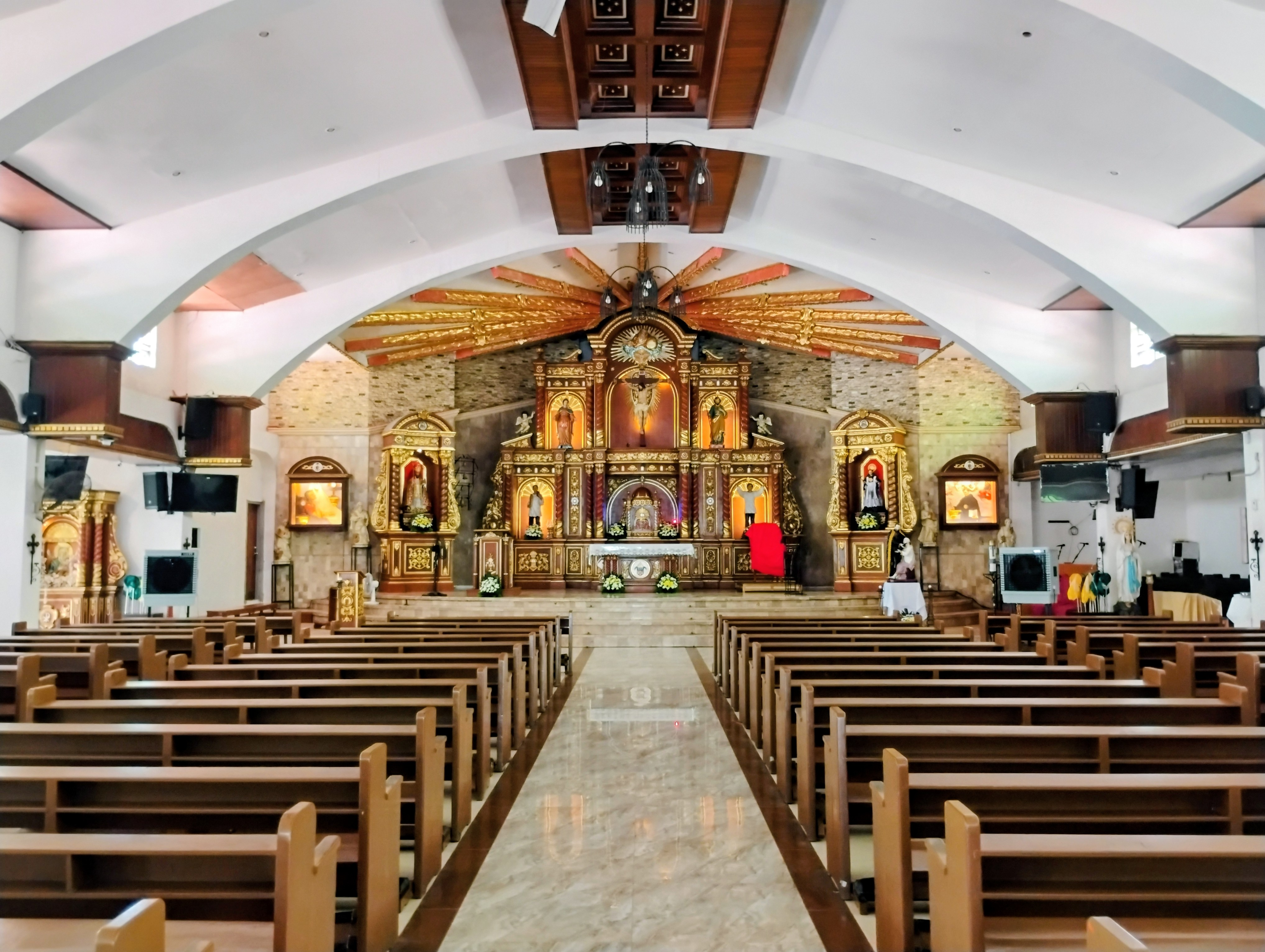
Church interior in 2026

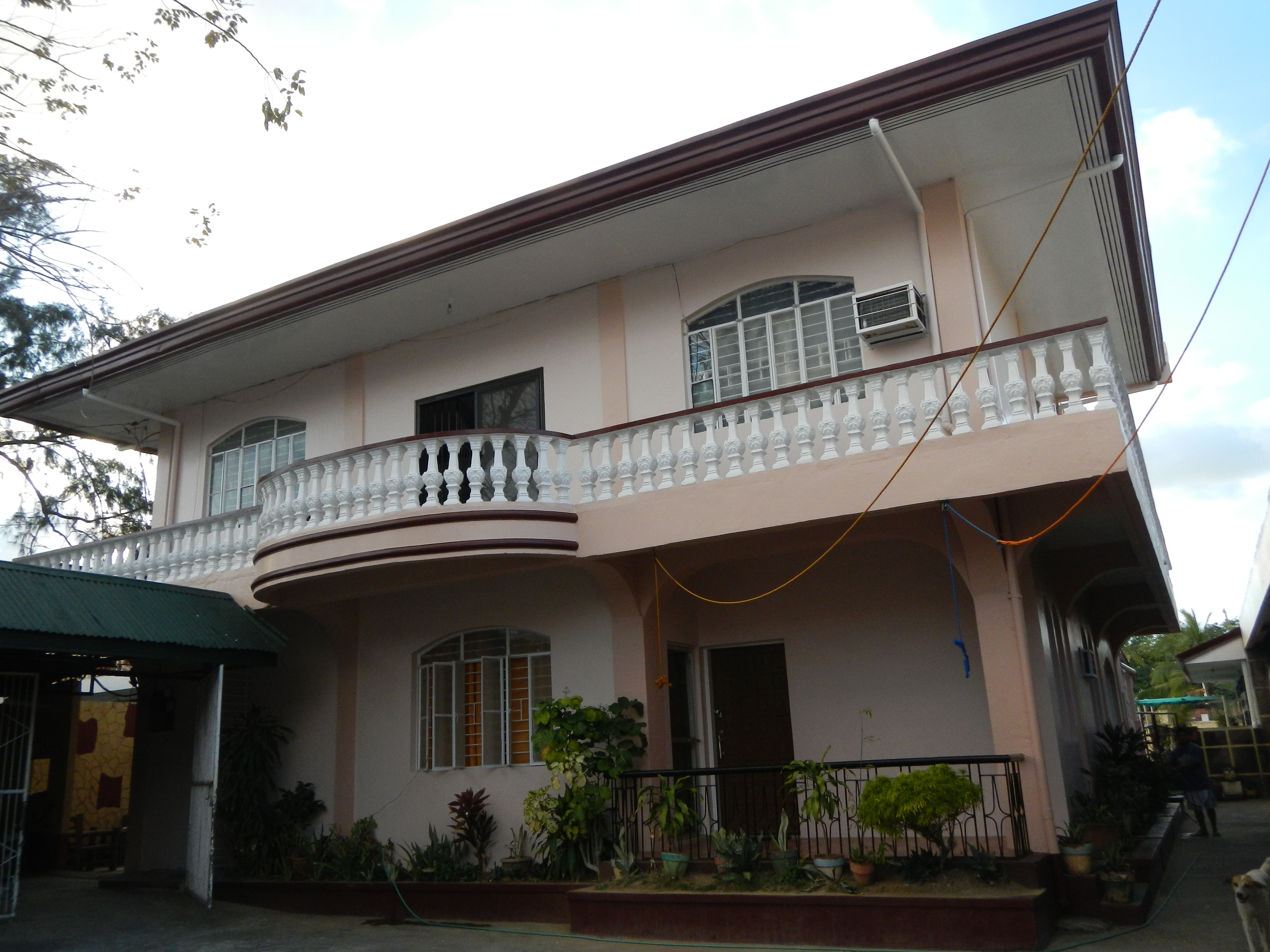
Convent
