= Bishop of Balanga =

- Bishopric

catholic
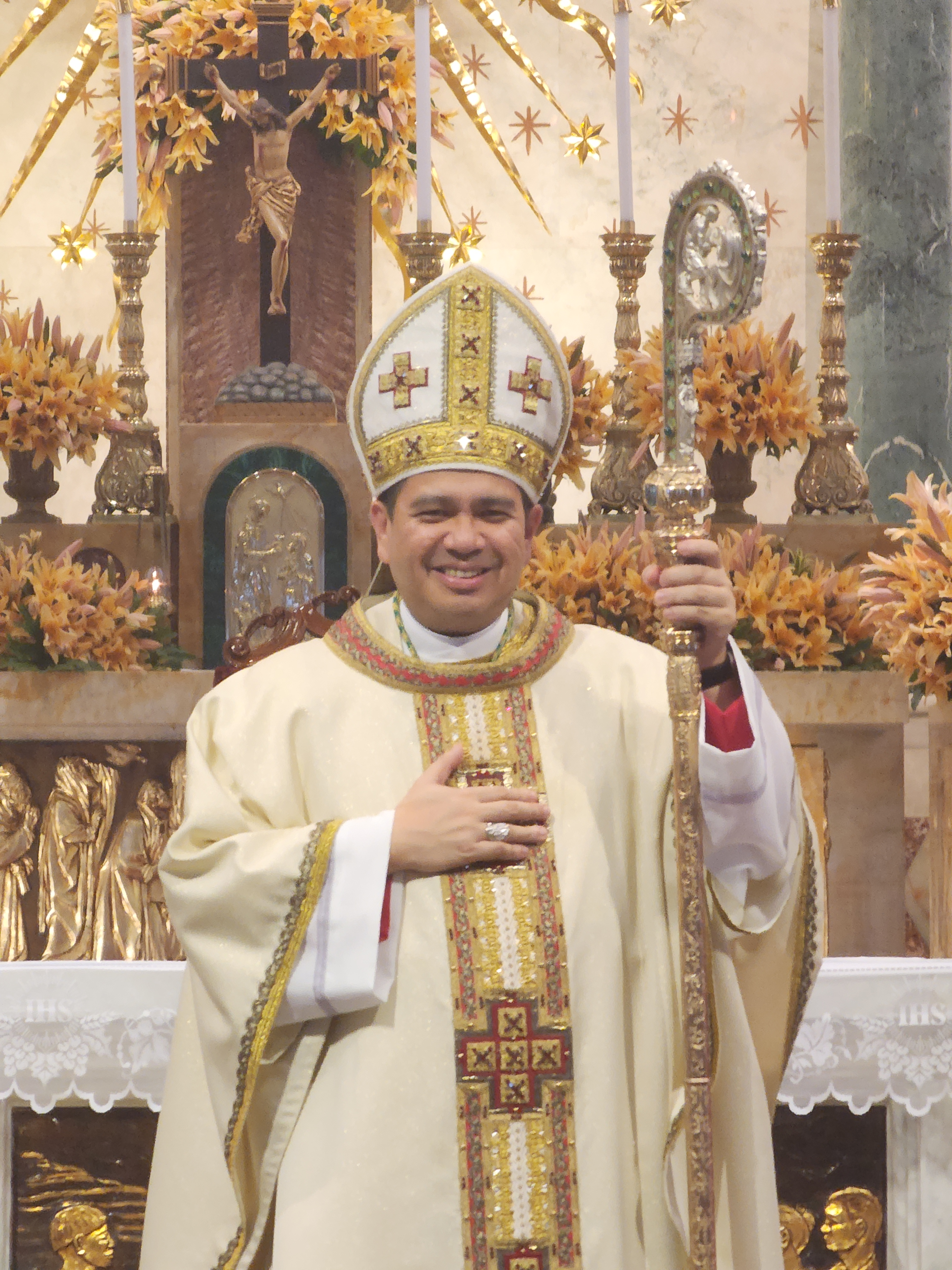

- Coat of arms
- Incumbent; Rufino Coronel Sescon, Jr. since 1 March 2025
- Style: Most Reverend

Location
- Country: Philippines
- Ecclesiastical province: San Fernando
- Headquarters: Bishop's Residence, 41 Paterno Street, Poblacion, Balanga, Bataan (residence); Balanga Cathedral, Aguire Street, Poblacion, Balanga, Bataan (office)

Information
- First holder: Celso Nogoy Guevarra
- Denomination: Catholic Church
- Established: November 8, 1975
- Diocese: Balanga
- Cathedral: Balanga Cathedral
- Governance: Bataan

Website
- Diocese social media page

The Roman Catholic Bishop of Balanga is the head of the Diocese of Balanga having jurisdiction over the province of Bataan in the Philippines.

Since March 1, 2025, the current bishop is Rufino Sescon, succeeding Ruperto Santos who became Bishop of Antipolo covering Markina, Metro Manila and the province of Rizal on July 22, 2023.

== Position information ==
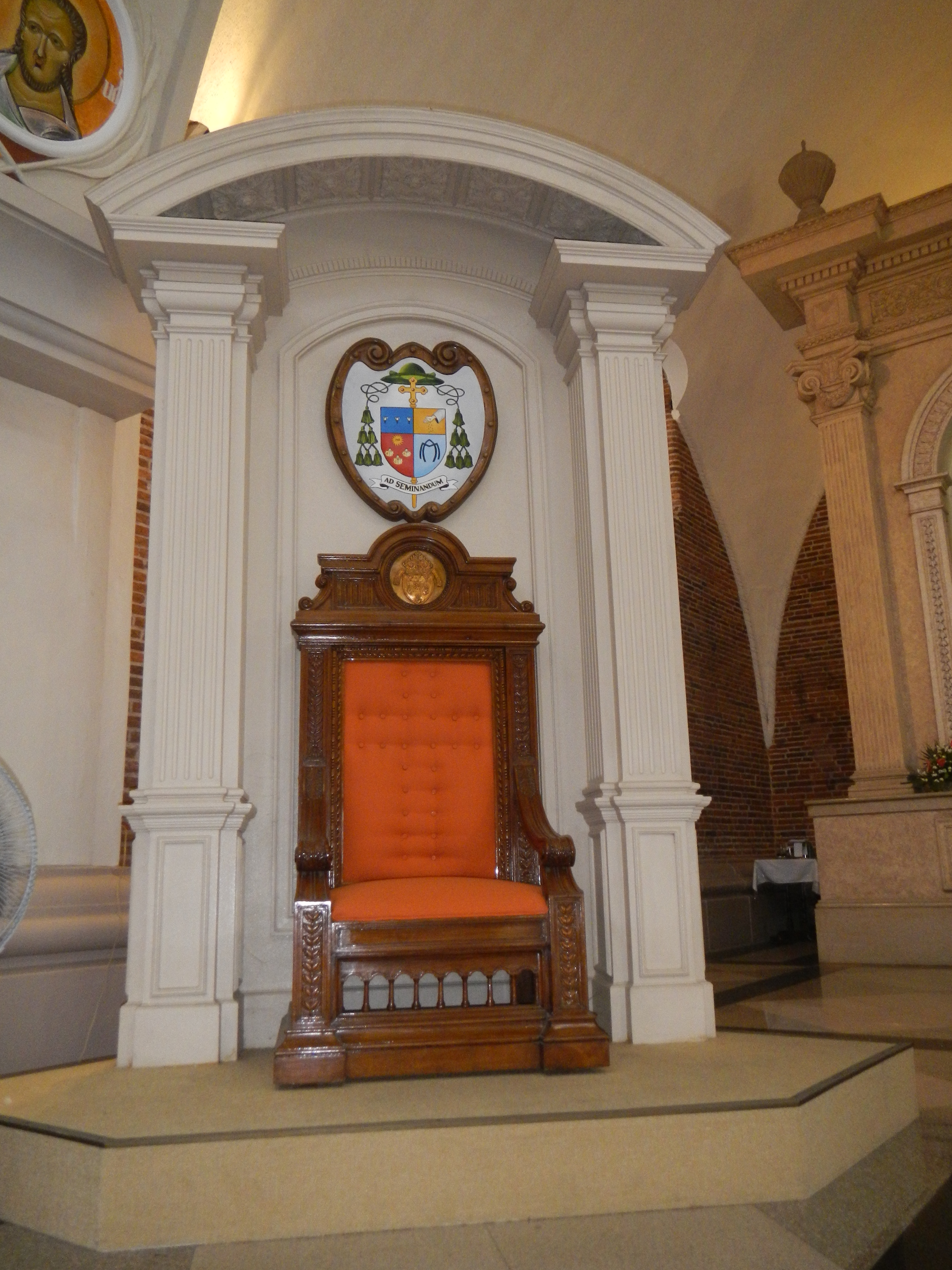
Coat of arms of Bishop Ruperto Santos that was displayed on the cathedra of Balanga Cathedral from the preparation for his July 8 start of office as fourth Bishop of Balanga on July 5, 2010 (which also placed his coat of arms at the cathedral floor on that date) as a result of April 1, 2010 appointment to the position until he became Bishop of Antipolo covering Marikina in Metro Manila and the province of Rizal on July 22, 2023.

Like other bishops and archbishops of dioceses and archdioceses, the Bishop of Balanga is appointed by the pope. Despite that the diocese is part of the Ecclesiastical Province of San Fernando, Pampanga, it and the bishop himself operates and governs independently from an archdiocese, and both directly under papal governance.

If the current bishop resigns, he simply continues to serve the position and office represented as the Balanga Cathedral until his successor takes one at the installation ceremony date.

On the other hand, if an administrator is simply a sede vacante diocesan administrator priest where he simply serves as in-between bishops in office, the start of a bishop's overall position tenure and its office are separate. At that case, his tenure start upon appointment and months later the cathedral prepares for installation into office where the coat of arms are placed at the floor and cathedra either few days or weeks before depending on the discretion or decision of an already appointed bishop in cooperation with an administrator and after the preparation, he is then installed at the ceremony marking his start of the position's office resulting from an appointment. If the one between is an apostolic administrator who is a prelate, however, the new bishop only start one upon being installed.

While the start of the bishop's tenure are different depending on the circumstances of vacancy, its end are only the same where it happens when he dies, resigns where his successor will take both, or installed into another diocese or archdiocese with the latter becoming an archbishop.

The bishop oversees 11 Catholic schools in the province under Diocesan Schools of Bataan Educational Foundation, Inc. (DSOBEFI), established in 2006 under Socrates Villegas, as board of trustees. Since June 5, 2020 with Ruperto Santos, he also acts as a parish administrator of parishes that do not have a rector and parish priest available to be designated while a particular 6-years term since the tenure of Villegas on July 2005 is still ongoing.

== History ==
The diocese was established by Pope Paul VI on March 17, 1975. Three months after its establishment, he appointed Celso Guevarra as the diocese's first bishop on June 4, 1975. At those times, Bataan was still under the jurisdiction of Archdiocese of San Fernando, Pampanga. Guevarra became bishop on his installation in November 8, 1975, establishing the position and separated the province from an archdiocese under the governance of its archbishop Emilio A. Cinense.

Celso Guevarra was the longest to serve the position at 22 years, 7 months, 4 days (8,258 days) from November 8, 1975 upon his retirement on June 18, 1998 where he was succeeded by Honesto Ongtioco as second bishop, serving until became Bishop of Cubao in Quezon City, Metro Manila on August 28, 2003, making the diocese having Bishop of Balanga continuously for 28 years.

On the other hand, the longest-living serving bishop and second overall of the diocese is Ruperto Santos, who was the priest of the Archdiocese of Manila and concurrently rector of Pontifical Filipino College in Rome, Italy for 27 and 11 years, respectively, from September 10, 1983 until his installation into office as fourth bishop on July 8, 2010 three months after his start of overall position tenure upon appointment by Pope Benedict XVI on April 1, 2010, the Holy Week, Holy Triduum, and Holy Thursday of 2010, since October 2015 at 13 years, 3 months, 21 days (4,860 days) from April 1, 2010 to July 22, 2023 with office at the said date of July 2010. He served the position at all years of Catholic Church involvement over his appointer from April 2010 to his funeral as pope-emeritus on January 5, 2023, 6 months and 17 days before stepping down as the diocese's bishop, and two deaths and wakes, and one funeral of sede vacante diocesan administrators Victor Ocampo and Antonio Dumaual from March 16 to July 22, 2023. Santos is also the first bishop to hold the position of a parish administrator at Mariveles Church from June 5, 2020 to June 4, 2023. However, the wake and funeral of Dumaual from July 22 to 31, 2023 is when Santos was already Bishop of Antipolo and under temporary bishopric of the diocese as apostolic administrator of Florentino Lavarias, Archbishop of San Fernando since October 27, 2014.

Since 2025, the diocese has 49 parishes with those established before November 1975 were inherited from the said archdiocese, 11 schools through the diocese's DSOBEFI formed in 2006, 863,610 Catholics, and 66 priests, all within its jurisdiction Bataan.

== Bishops ==
No.	Name and Coat of Arms	Period in Position	Appointed By	Ordained by	Installed into office by (Papal Nuncio of the Philippines and Archbishop of San Fernando, Pampanga)		Notes
1	Celso Nogoy Guevarra (1923–2002; Capas, Tarlac)	November 8, 1975 – June 18, 1998; 22 years, 7 months and 10 days (8,258 days)	Paul VI	Carmine Rocco (Indianapolis)	Bruno Torpigliani	Emilio A. Cinense (Territorial takeover from the archdiocese)	Longest-serving Bishop of Balanga. He died on August 13, 2002.
2	Honesto Flores "Ness" Ongtioco (1948– ; San Fernando, Pampanga)	June 18, 1998 – August 28, 2003; 5 years, 2 months and 10 days (1,897 days)	John Paul II	Jaime Sin (Manila)	Gian Vincenzo Moreni	Paciano Aniceto	Became Bishop of Cubao from August 28, 2003 to December 3, 2024 and sede vacante apostolic administrator (temporary bishop) of Malolos covering the province of Bulacan and Valenzuela, Metro Manila from May 11, 2018 to August 21, 2019.
3	Socrates Buenaventura "Soc" Villegas (1960–; Pateros, Rizal (now Metro Manila))	May 3, 2004 – November 4, 2009; 5 years, 6 months and 1 day (2,011 days)	John Paul II	Jaime Sin (Manila)	Antonio Franco	Paciano Aniceto	Took overall position on May 3, 2004 and office on July 3, 2004 as such the first Bishop of Balanga to take the position and office separately, youngest to take the overall position upon appointment and office at the installation and leave both, became Archbishop of Lingayen-Dagupan on November 4, 2009.
4	Ruperto Cruz "Stude" Santos (1957–; San Rafael, Bulacan)	April 1, 2010 – July 22, 2023; 13 years, 3 months and 21 days (4,860 days)	Benedict XVI	Jaime Sin (Manila)	Edward Joseph Adams	Paciano Aniceto	First bishop in the Philippines to start episcopate in the 2010s decade upon taking the position on April 1, 2010, took office on July 8, 2010, longest-living serving bishop and second overall since October 2015, served on all years of the Catholic Church involvement over his appointing pope Benedict XVI both as pope and pope-emeritus until funeral on January 5, 2023, became parish administrator of Mariveles Church from June 5, 2020 to June 4, 2023, elevated more churches into higher status than his three predecessors combined, became Bishop of Antipolo on July 22, 2023.
5	Rufino Coronel "Jun" Sescon, Jr. (1972–; Manila)	March 1, 2025 – present 1 year, 3 months and 25 days	Francis	Jaime Sin (Manila)	Charles John Brown	Florentino Lavarias (Outgoing apostolic administrator at the time of installation ceremony)	Current bishop.

== Bishops of the diocese who became bishop-emeritus on another diocese or after serving as Bishop of Balanga ==
- Honesto Ongtioco (Cubao), since December 3, 2024.
