= Orion Church =

Roman Catholic church in Bataan, Philippines

- Saint Michael the Archangel Parish Church
- Parokya ng San Miguel Arkanghel (Filipino)
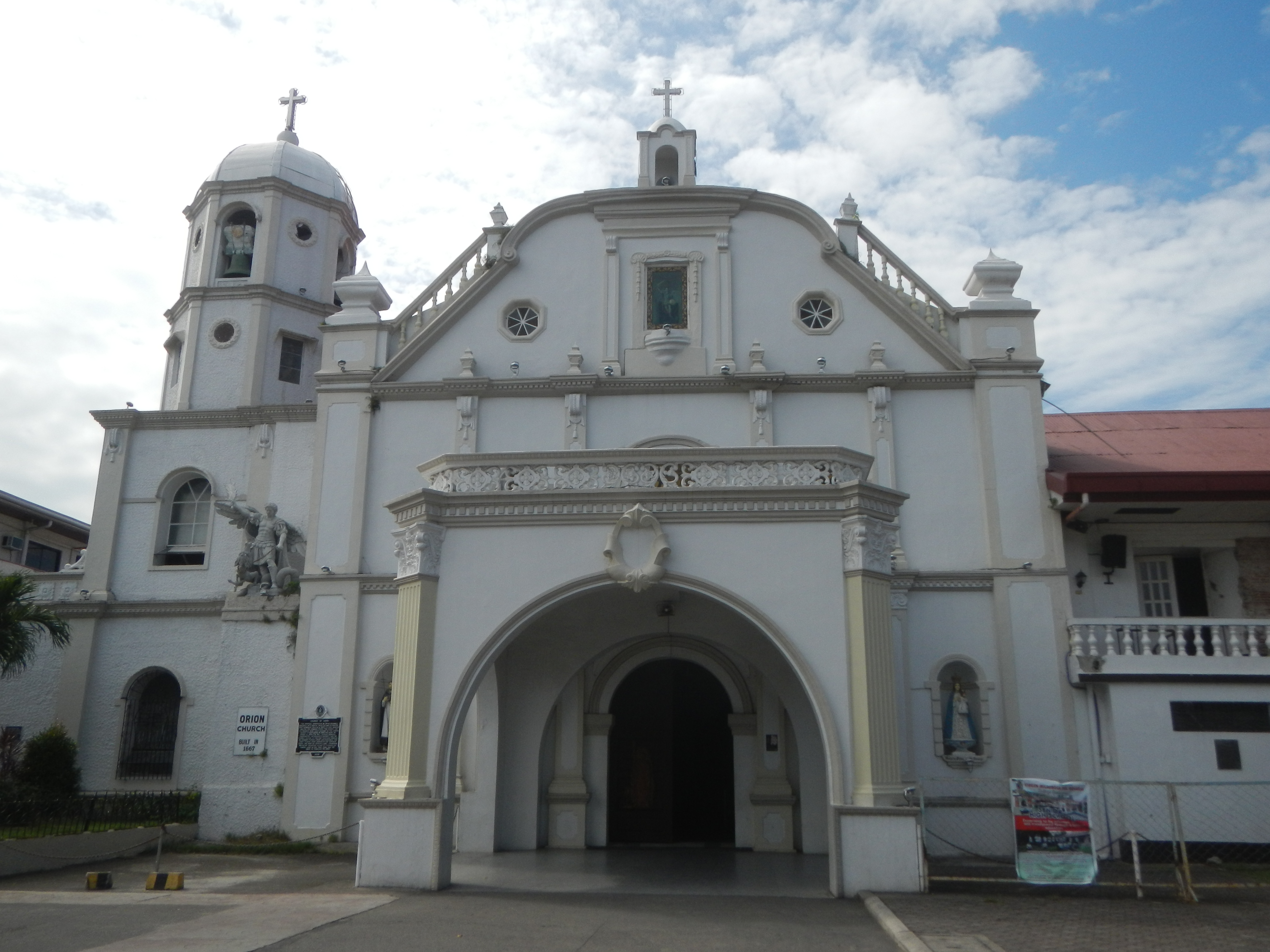
- Church facade in 2017

- Location in Luzon Location in the Philippines
- 14°37′18″N 120°34′35″E
- Location: Bataan
- Country: Philippines
- Denomination: Roman Catholic
- Website: Facebook page

History
- Status: Parish church
- Founded: 1667
- Founder(s): Father Jose Campomares, OP
- Dedication: Saint Michael the Archangel

Architecture
- Functional status: Active
- Architectural type: Church building
- Style: Baroque
- Completed: After 1852

Specifications
- Materials: Brick, Sand, Stone, Gravel, Cement, Steel, Concrete

Administration
- Division: Vicariate of St. Michael the Archangel
- Province: San Fernando
- Metropolis: San Fernando
- Archdiocese: San Fernando
- Diocese: Balanga
- Parish: Saint Michael the Archangel

Clergy
- Archbishop: Florentino G. Lavarias
- Bishop: Rufino C. Sescon Jr.
- Vicar: Fr. Jay Quicho
- Priest: Fr. Abraham SP. Pantig

Saint Michael the Archangel Parish Church, commonly known as Orion Church, is a 17th-century, Baroque Roman Catholic church located at Brgy. San Vicente, Orion, Bataan, Philippines. The parish church, dedicated to Saint Michael, the Archangel, is under the jurisdiction of the Diocese of Balanga. The current priest of the parish church is Fr. Abraham SP. Pantig and its parochial vicar is Fr. Jay Quicho.

== History ==
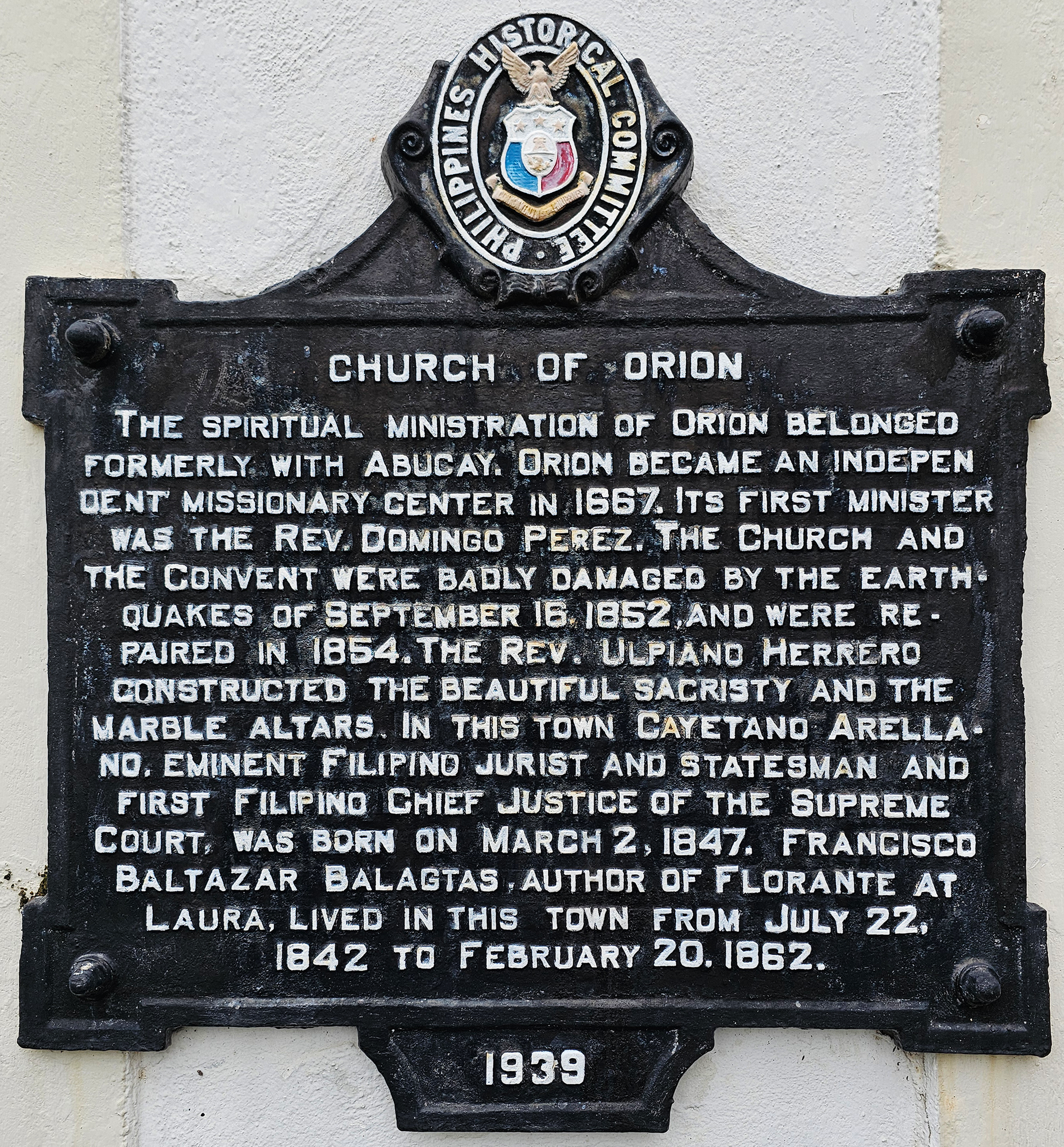
Church PHC historical marker installed in 1939

Orion was established by the Dominican Priests on April 30, 1667. The present-day 19th-century church was built by Father Jose Campomanes, OP after an earthquake in 1852 which destroyed the previous structure.

== Architecture and ornamentation ==
=== Exterior ===
The church façade is of barn-style Baroque, a style that has been described as typically found in most Spanish-era churches in the Philippines. It features side pillars capped by urn-like finials, pilasters that divide the façade into five segments and cornices that divide the expanse of the wall into two levels. The pediment is semi-arched and ends into two small volutes before tapering down to the sides. It is adorned by a framed saint's niche flanked by two hexagonal windows. A concrete porte cochere was added later into the structure. To the left of the church rises the four-level, slender belfry. The two uppermost levels are octagonal and are pierced with rectangular, circular and semicircular arched campanile windows.

A marker bearing the brief history of the structure was installed in its façade by the National Historical Committee, precursor of the National Historical Commission of the Philippines.

=== Interior ===
The main altarpiece or retablo, which was done in the early 18th century, is done in Rococo style.

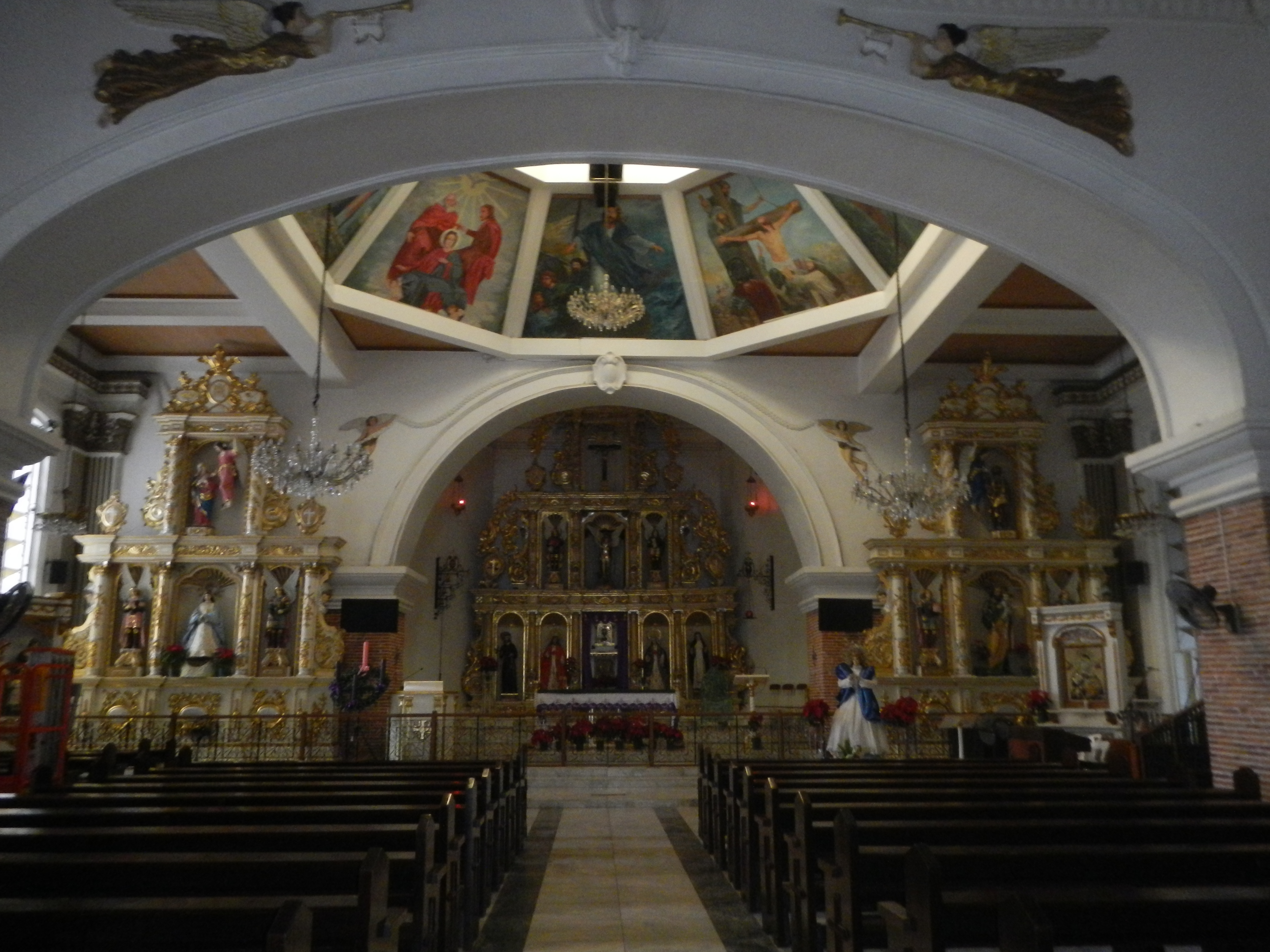
Church interior in 2017

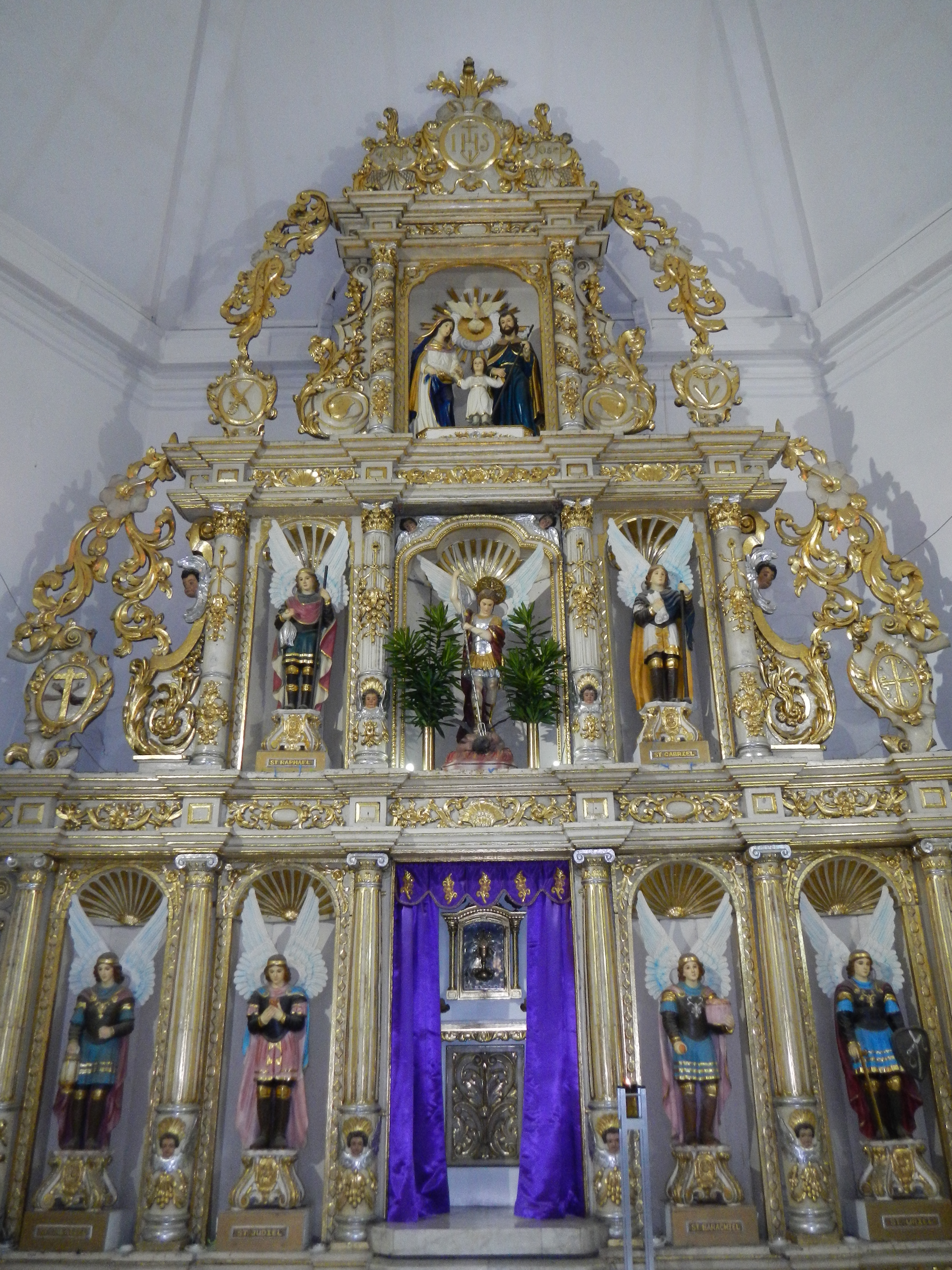
18th century altarpiece featuring the seven archangels and a tableau of the Holy Family

== See also ==
- Balanga Cathedral
