= Ruperto Santos =

Filipino Catholic prelate (born 1957)

The Most Reverend Ruperto C. Santos D.D., STL
- Bishop of Antipolo
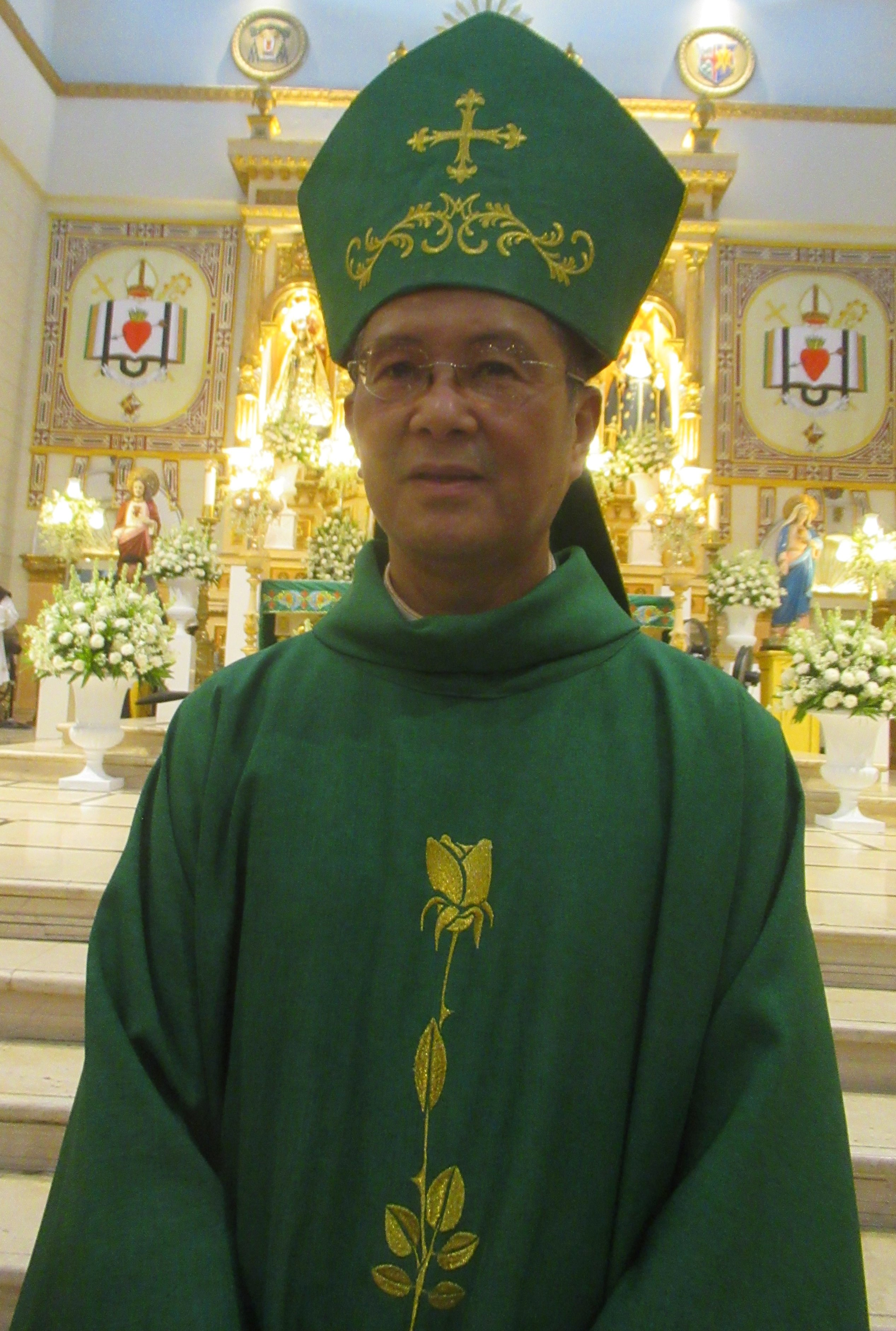
- Santos in 2024
- Province: Manila
- Diocese: Antipolo
- Appointed: May 24, 2023
- Installed: July 22, 2023
- Predecessor: Francisco Mendoza de Leon
- Successor: Incumbent
- Previous posts: Priest, Archdiocese of Manila (1983‍–‍2010); Rector, Pontificio Collegio Filippino in Rome (1999‍–‍2010); Bishop of Balanga (2010‍–‍2023); Parish Administrator, Diocesan Shrine and Parish of St. Nicholas Tolentino, Mariveles, Bataan (2020‍–‍2023)

Orders
- Ordination: September 10, 1983 by Jaime Lachica Sin, O.F.S.
- Consecration: June 24, 2010 by Gaudencio Rosales

Personal details
- Born: October 30, 1957 (age 69) San Rafael, Bulacan
- Education: San Carlos Seminary; Pontificia Universita Gregoriana
- Motto: Ad Seminandum (Latin for 'To Sow' – Mark 4:3)

Ordination history
History
Priestly ordination
- Ordained by: Jaime Lachica Sin
Episcopal consecration
- Principal consecrator: Gaudencio Borbon Rosales
- Co-consecrators: Ricardo Jamin Vidal; Edward Joseph Adams
- Styles
- Reference style: The Most Reverend
- Spoken style: Your Excellency
- Religious style: Bishop

Ruperto Cruz Santos, also known as Bishop Stude, (born October 30, 1957) is a Filipino prelate of the Catholic Church. Santos is the fifth and current Bishop of Antipolo since July 22, 2023. He is the president of the Episcopal Commission for Pastoral Care for Migrants and Itinerant People (ECMI) of the Catholic Bishops' Conference of the Philippines.

Prior to his current position, Santos previously served as priest of Archdiocese of Manila for 27 years from September 10, 1983 where he concurrently held the position as rector of Pontifical Filipino College while serving the former from 1999 to July 8, 2010. He then succeeded Socrates Villegas who became fifth Archbishop of Lingayen-Dagupan in Pangasinan on November 4, 2009 as fourth Bishop of Balanga in Bataan from April 1, 2010, to July 22, 2023 (installed or assumed office on July 8, 2010) as such making him the first bishop in the Philippines to start episcopate in the 2010s decade upon his appointment date to the position and on his last three years of serving the position, he was also the parish administrator of Diocesan Shrine and Parish of St. Nicholas Tolentino, Mariveles, Bataan from June 5, 2020, to June 4, 2023 making him the first diocese's bishop to hold the position of an administrator. With 13 years, 3 months, and 21 days, 4,860 days, or 14 calendar years as Bishop of Balanga, Santos is the diocese's longest-serving living and the second longest bishop overall after Celso Guevarra since October 4, 2015. As rector of the college, he was succeeded by Gregory Ramon Gaston on September 2, 2010.

== Personal life and education ==
Santos was born on October 30, 1957, in Caingin, San Rafael, Bulacan, to Norberto Santos and Aurelia Cruz Santos. He has three sisters, Maria Lourdes, Maria Corazon, and Rosalind, and a brother, Rodelio.

All of his siblings are married and have children – Maria Theresa, Maria Grace, Marco Paulo, Jaime Paulo, Nicole, Jacob, and PJ.

He received his primary education at Caingin Elementary School and completed his studies and seminary formation at Our Lady of Guadalupe Minor Seminary (high school) and at San Carlos Seminary in Makati (college and theology) in the Archdiocese of Manila.

== Ministry ==
=== 1983–2010: Priesthood ===
Santos was ordained priest on September 10, 1983, at the Manila Cathedral by the Archbishop of Manila, Jaime Cardinal Sin.

During his 27-year tenure as priest of the Archdiocese of Manila from September 10, 1983, to July 8, 2010, he became parochial vicar at the Immaculate Concepcion Parish in Pasig (1983–1986), chaplain of Pasig Catholic College (1983–1987), priest at San Antonio Abad Church in Maybunga, Pasig (1986–1987), professor of church history, patrology, and homiletics at San Carlos Graduate School of Theology and Holy Apostles Senior Seminary in Makati, visiting priest at the EDSA Shrine and Our Lady of the Pillar Parish in Pilar Village, Las Piñas (1990–1997), prefect of discipline of the Philosophy Department of San Carlos Seminary (1990–1992), professor of church history at San Carlos Seminary (1990–1995), academic dean of San Carlos Graduate School of Theology, Library Director of San Gabriel Reyes Memorial Library at San Carlos Graduate School of Theology, chief archivist of the Manila Archdiocesan Archives and curator and director of the Manila Archdiocesan Museum (1992–1997), guest lecturer for novices and postulants in the mother house of the Sisters of Saint Paul of Chartres in Antipolo (1992–1995), consultor of the Pontifical Commission for the Cultural Heritage of the Church in the Vatican (1995–2005), vice-rector and oeconomus of the Pontificio Collegio Filippino in Rome, Italy (1997–1999), rector of the same college (1999–2010), and national coordinator of the Italian Episcopal Conference for the pastoral care of Filipino migrants in Italy (2003).

After several years in the Archdiocese of Manila, he was sent to Rome in 1987 for further studies and took up his licentiate in church history at the Pontificia Universita Gregoriana.

In 2005, he became a member of the Pontifical Committee for International Eucharistic Congresses in the Vatican. He has also written a number of books regarding historical interests published by the Archdiocese of Manila and regarding homilies, prayers, and spirituality published by St. Pauls Publishing.

=== 2010–2023: Bishop of Balanga ===
Pope Benedict XVI named Santos as fourth Bishop of Balanga on April 1, 2010, a Holy Week, Maundy Thursday, and Holy Triduum of that year, making him the first bishop in the Philippines to start the overall bishop tenure in the 2010s decade. He continued to serve as rector of Pontificio Collegio Filippino and priest of the Archdiocese of Manila until his installation into office as the diocese's bishop on July 8, 2010, ending the 8-month-and-3-days sede vacante period or vacancy of office from a day after his predecessor Socrates Villegas became Archbishop of Lingayen-Dagupan in Pangasinan on November 5, 2009, to July 2010 under diocesan administrator Victor Ocampo.

The preparation for Santos' assumption into office were made from July 5 to 8, 2010, the last four days of sede vacante period, which involved placing his coat of arms at the cathedra and floor of Balanga Cathedral, and modification of the cathedra. His installation ceremony on July 8, 2010, was presided by the then-Apostolic Nuncio to the Philippines Edward Joseph Adams and Archbishop of San Fernando, Pampanga Paciano Aniceto. Also present in the installation are Bishop of Malolos Jose Francisco Oliveros having jurisdiction over Valenzuela and Santos' home province Bulacan, Santos' predecessors Honesto Ongtioco (also the former priest of Archdiocese of San Fernando during Paciano's (installation ceremony's main presider) tenure from January 31, 1989, to June 18, 1998, and future sede vacante apostolic administrator of Malolos from May 11, 2018, to August 21, 2019) and Socrates Villegas, and outgoing administrator Victor Ocampo.

Santos decreed the creation and addition of five parishes, four more diocesan shrines (only Orani Church was the only diocesan shrine in the entire Diocese of Balanga by the time he was appointed as the diocese's fourth bishop on April 1, 2010, and assumed office three months later on July 8), and one minor basilica, national shrine and chapel were created during his tenure as bishop of the diocese, with Residencia Sacerdotal, Retirement Home for Priests (Our Lady of Guadalupe Chapel) in Taglesville, Balanga started construction on late 2010 months after he assumed office on July 8 of that year and finished in 2011. He also designated old churches in Hermosa, Orani, Samal, Abucay, Balanga City, Pilar and Orion as seven pilgrim churches that thousands of pilgrims from other provinces visit, especially during the Lenten season.

One month after Santos took office on July 8, 2010, he made few appointments on late 2010 at parishes and churches of the Diocese of Balanga, and that included the diocesan shrine and parish of St. Nicholas Tolentino (Mariveles, Bataan) where he appointed two parochial vicars or assistant priests for its rector and parish priest Msgr. Hernando Guanzon (last priest to be appointed by his predecessor Socrates Villegas in July 2009 at the said church) which are Rev. Fr. Jefferson A. Paule and Jhoen B. Buenaventura on August and October 2010, respectively.

Five and two months after Santos' start of overall position tenure and taking office of it respectively, Gregory Ramon Gaston succeeded him on September 2, 2010, as rector of the said college in Rome.

He made two quinquennial visit ad limina in Rome on December 2, 2010 (five months after starting office of the position upon installation) and May 20, 2019.

Changes to the Balanga Cathedral were made during under Santos' tenure which are the improvement of its patio and numerous vendors were discouraged within the cathedral's premises. Walls and fences outside the cathedral were changed in 2012. In 2013, a statue of St. Gemma Galgani was added as the 16th and latest statue to be installed outside the cathedral due to St. Gemma Galgani Church in Mt. View, Mariveles, Bataan became a parish on July 21, 2012, which included on a roster of the diocese's churches and parishes. In 2014, the Santuario de San Jose was blessed. The Sacrestia de San Jose underwent renovation and blessed in 2015. Pavement of the ground on the exterior was made from 2017 to 2018, and the belfry added the bricks in 2019. In 2020, the cathedral's roof were painted from green and white to red. The Cathedral Shrine's Rectory and Sacristy with its fence and patio were also built during his tenure. Months before his tenure ended on July 22, 2023, the cathedral's leftmost door was removed and replaced with a wall.

In 2015, he opened the first diocesan theology seminary called Virgen Milagrosa del Rosario College Seminary.

He founded a foundation named Ad Seminandum RCS 10 Foundation, Inc., with the name being a reference to his motto as bishop (Ad Seminandum), initials (RCS), and 10 being the month number of his birthday (October which is the 10th month of the year) and part of a number of a year when he became Bishop of Balanga (2010) and was disestablished when he stepped down the position and office on July 22, 2023. His motto is also used as the name of an award (Ad Seminandum Award - Bishop's Award).

Santos became a governing council member for Asia of the International Migration Commission, Vatican from 2015 to 2022.

He continued written a number of books regarding homilies, prayers, and spirituality published by St. Paul's (SSP). In addition to spiritual books, he also wrote about the Diocese of Balanga and its churches, and Bataan province where the diocese has jurisdiction with.

From June 5, 2020, to June 4, 2023, he served as parish administrator of the Diocesan shrine and Parish of St. Nicholas de Tolentino in Mariveles on a concurrent capacity, the first bishop to do so in the diocese. During his 3-year tenure as administrator of the parish church, he had six substitute priests which are the five priests of Sto. Niño Parish Church in Alas-Asin named Robert Laracas, Ponciano G. Balmes, Marvin Gomez, Gerald Cuenca and Christopher Alday (with Alday was demoted from being parochial vicar or assistant to simply a substitute priest under Regin L. Tenorio), and Jay Quicho. As in charge of the parish church, he initiated changes within the parish such as the change in mass schedules (with Sunday Mass being temporary), and changing of the church's facade and a new church bell from Royal Bells Philippines. On February 25, 2023, he declared and elevated the said church into a diocesan shrine.

Later in his tenure, he implemented two majestic versions of Gloria in excelsis Deo in the diocese which are the one used in World Youth Day 1995 papal mass with Pope John Paul II and 2007 version of the song in Filipino by Dom Benildus Maria P. Maramba, OSB and Misa Inmaculada Conception, respectively.

In 2022, the Quasi-San Antonio de Padua along Roman Superhighway in Orion began construction being the final church building to be constructed under his tenure, with it continued through Florentino Lavarias, Archbishop of San Fernando since October 27, 2014 as apostolic administrator from July 22, 2023 to March 1, 2025 and successor Rufino Sescon from March 1, 2025. The parish itself, however, was erected on March 28, 2024, the Holy Thursday of 2024, under Lavarias.

In January 2023, the Diocese of Balanga mourned the passing of Pope Benedict XVI who appointed him as bishop on April 1, 2010, saying that amid sorrow and sadness, “we are assured of his eternal peace and rest in Heaven.” He said that the Bataan faithful were in grief over the death of the pope emeritus on Sunday morning at the Vatican at 95 on December 31, 2022.

In March 2023, Santos presided over the farewell trip and mass of Bishop of Gumaca Victor Ocampo who also served as the diocesan administrator before he started the position's office on July 8, 2010, at Balanga Cathedral. Also on that same month, the mass for the 48th Canonical Erection Anniversary of the Diocese of Balanga was held with San Fernando archbishop and future apostolic administrator Florentino Lavarias as main celebrant where the coat of arms for the diocese's 50th anniversary from March 17 to November 8, 2025 was unveiled. Also on that same month, he returned to his hometown San Rafael, Bulacan for the feast of St. John of God.

Exactly at Santos' 13th and final year on April 1, 2023, the Diocesan Shrine and Parish of St. John Paul II in Roman Superhighway, Brgy. Culis, Hermosa, Bataan, constructed from 2016 to 2019, was elevated into the national shrine on a mass presided by Bishop of Kalookan Pablo Virgilio David through the authority of Santos, and its second parish priest and first rector Anthony Sibug, making the first church in the diocese to receive the status.

He held his last mass as the diocese's bishop on July 16, 2023. It was also during Santos' last months where the diocese's association of Catholic schools in Bataan which is Diocesan Schools of Bataan (DSOB), established in 2006 by his predecessor Socrates Villegas, changed its name to Diocesan Schools of Bataan and Educational Foundation, Inc. (DSOBEFI).

On July 21, 2023, one day before Santos ended his tenure to became fifth Bishop of Antipolo the following day in July 22, another former diocesan administrator of Balanga named Msgr. Antonio "Tony" Dumaual who served when Honesto Ongtioco became Bishop of Cubao on August 28, 2003, until Socrates Villegas assumed office as third Bishop of Balanga on July 3, 2004, died at 3:30 pm and 80 years old.

After Santos stepped down as Bishop of Balanga for his next position as Bishop of Antipolo on July 22, 2023, Bataan temporarily returned to the jurisdiction of the Archdiocese of San Fernando after 48 years and 8 months under Florentino Lavarias which lasted from the said date of July 2023 until Rufino Sescon became fifth bishop on March 1, 2025, 16 days before the diocese turned 50 on March 17 when Sescon was already bishop. The version of Santos' coat of arms of the Diocese of Balanga that is used from April 2010, however, continued to be used by the diocese as placeholder during sede vacante period or his coat of arms as Bishop of Antipolo is used on some churches of the diocese if referencing Santos to establish and maintain continuity until the installation of his successor Sescon on March 2025. The mass for the repose of Dumaual's soul and his funeral, and blessing of the body were presided by Santos' predecessor Socrates Villegas who returned to Balanga, Bataan for the repose on July 25 and Lavarias for the blessing and funeral mass on July 23 (a day after Santos became Bishop of Antipolo) and 31, respectively.

=== 2023–present: Bishop of Antipolo ===
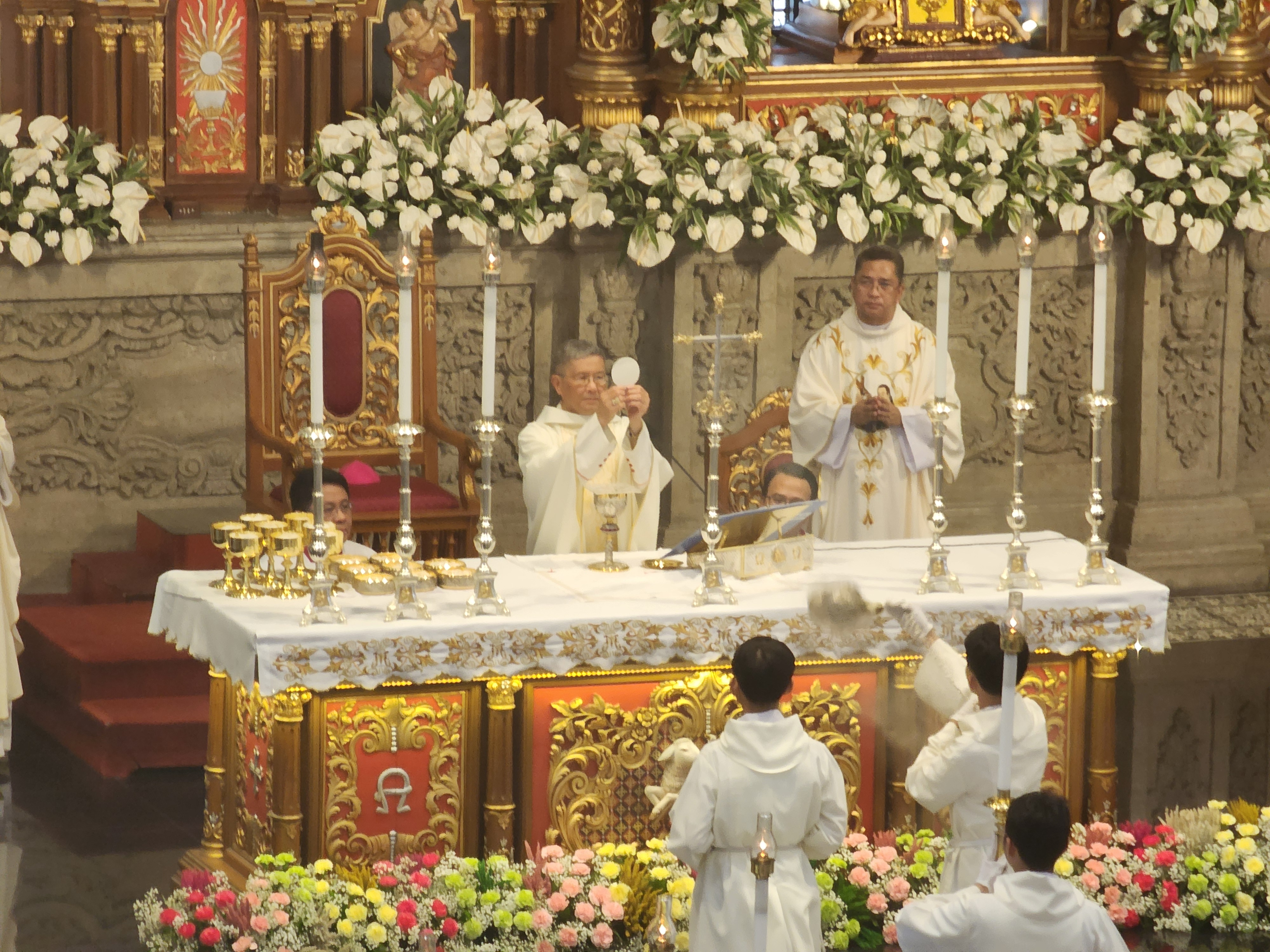
Santos presiding over a canonical coronation Mass at the Diocesan Shrine of Saint Paul of the Cross in Marikina on May 12, 2024.

Pope Francis named Santos as the fifth Bishop of Antipolo on May 24, 2023. Santos then became the diocese's bishop when he was installed on July 22, 2023, succeeding Francisco Mendoza de Leon who reached the retirement age of 75 which ended his 13 years, 3 months, and 21 days tenure as Bishop of Balanga. It marked his return to the Ecclessiastical Province of Manila after having the overall position upon appointment to the latter on April 1, 2010, that resulted to subsequent July 8, 2010 installation into office until the said date of July 2023 at the Ecclessiastical Province of San Fernando. The ceremony was led by the Papal Nuncio to the Philippines Archbishop Charles John Brown together with Jose Cardinal Advincula, Archbishop of Manila.

He made various returns to Balanga, Bataan, for an honorary doctorate in recognition of his “distinguished service” to the community and made an honorary Doctor of Education of the Bataan Peninsula State University (BPSU) with the awarding held during the BPSU commencement exercises at the Bataan People's Center, Bataan Provincial Capitol Compound, Balanga, on October 2, 2023, 35th Founding Anniversary of Bahay Puso on June 15, 2024, Triduum Mass at Orion Church for the 50th anniversary of his previous diocese Balanga on February 15, 2025, and at the ceremony of his successor Rufino Sescon becoming fifth bishop on March 1, 2025.

Santos solemnly declared Antipolo Cathedral on January 26, 2024. He first crowned the image of Our Lady of Peace and Good Voyage with Archbishop Brown where a Mass was held together with the eighty bishops of CBCP. Government officials were attended at the ceremony including First Lady Liza Marcos, President Bongbong Marcos' wife. One month after, the said Marian church received a Golden Rose from Pope Francis, the first in Asia and the Philippines, at a thanksgiving mass with Archbishop Salvatore "Rino" Fisichella, pro-prefect of the Dicastery for Evangelization.

Following the installation of Nolly C. Buco, Auxiliary Bishop of Antipolo, on January 15, 2025, to become third Bishop of Catarman, Santos became the administrator of Antipolo Cathedral holding the position concurrently since then.

From 2025 to 2026, he mandated the construction of Saint John Paul II Minor Seminary Chapel.

== Activity ==
=== Catholic Bishops Conference of the Philippines ===
Since December 1, 2011, Santos held various positions at Catholic Bishops Conference of the Philippines (CBCP), such as being a member of CBCP Migrants and Itinerant People and chairman, Pontificio Collegio Filippino (2011–2013), Vice Chairman of CBCP Commission on the Pontificio Collegio Filipino (2013–2017), Chairman of CBCP Commission for the Pastoral Care of Migrants and Itinerant People (2013–2019), CBCP Central Luzon Regional Representative and Member, CBCP Committee for International Congresses (2015–2019), board member of CBCP Pension Plan Committee and Member, CBCP Commission on Prison Pastoral Care (2017–2019), CBCP Bishop Promoter of Stella Maris - Philippines, and Chairman of CBCP Commission on Pontificio Collegio Filippino (2019–present).

=== Philippine politics ===
Santos expressed opposition against RH bill like former president Gloria Macapagal Arroyo as he said that the prayer vigil started with the rosary and a mass against RH bill and then followed by the prayer rally that will accompany with the rally at the EDSA Shrine to be officiated by the city government of Balanga. He stated that there are conferences, seminars, and marches against the RH bill, with the goal of the “diocesan-wide campaign” is to protect the sanctity of human life and the family, he told CBCP News.

Like with his predecessor Socrates Villegas, he expressed opposition on the revival of Bataan Nuclear Power Plant (BNPP) as it will put the lives on the brink of danger and shadow of impending death, result in the disruption of ecosystem, cause the soil to be poisoned and no longer viable to be cultivated, and livelihood will be destroyed. Santos also criticized the shutdown of ABS-CBN's main terrestrial channel due to non-renewal of the network's broadcast franchise application where he expressed that untimely and disservice at this time of pandemic, the shutdown is a great loss, an added suffering for Filipinos, and never bring healing. He sympathized to the network's more than 11,000 employees who risk losing their jobs.

Santos is appreciated with President Rodrigo Duterte's first State of the Nation Address (SONA) as he found out that it is inspiring and encouraging. He said that the President is magnanimous and forgiving – he did not resort to finger-pointing and the sins of the past. He pointed out realistically the situation and offered concrete action. He also thanked the President for his concern for the welfare of overseas Filipino workers. Santos stated that he is grateful for the president's compassion and concern to Overseas Filipino Workers (OFW) as he plans a single office to attend to their needs and asking to continue to protect the well-being of the OFWs. He also criticized the administration as he stated on an interview with Radio Veritas that his presidency is a disappointment and disgrace to the country. He lamented how Duterte's supporters laughed at his violent threats. Presidential Spokesperson told the bishop that instead of lambasting the President, Santos should instead pray for the President, “the way we pray for the Bishop’s enlightenment, that PRRD may run the affairs of the country well instead of lambasting him."

== Coat of arms ==
Coat of arms of Ruperto Santos
Adopted July 16, 2023 Helm Bishop's Galero; The shield is surmounted by the bishop's galero or ecclesiastical hat of this rank with six tassels for each side in Vert (green) that signifies the rank of a Bishop. Escutcheon Parted per fess: First: Argent (white), Vert (green) Tipolo leaves, Second: Azure (blue), image of the Virgin of Antipolo; Impaled with a shield tierced per fess: First: Azure (blue), or (yellow) pearl and tower, and argent (white) pearl and lions, Second: Or (yellow), rod with a fish, pilgrim's bell hangs from the staff, rod with budding lilies, and book containin "Via, Veritas, et Vita Est" (He is the Way, the Truth, and the Life (John 14:6)). Motto AD SEMINANDUM "To Sow." The motto was taken from Mark 4:3, "Audite: Ecce exiit seminans ad seminandum" (Hear this! A sower went out to sow). This is from the many parables that Jesus used to teach to the people that present to them an imagery of everyday life that they could identify with. Jesus, Himself, said that the parables were the way by which He tries to make them understand the mystery of the Kingdom of God. Other elements Jerusalem Cross; The shield is also surmounted by the Jerusalem cross, symbolizing the bishop's dignity. The cross has become an identifiable symbol in Antipolo in the seal of the Cathedral and International Shrine of Our Lady of peace and Good Voyage and in the miter in the coat of arms of the Diocese to signify the mark of a pilgrim on earth. The four crosslets are interpreted as the four Gospels of Matthew, Mark, Luke, and John with Christ as the large Cross to signify the way of Jesus. These also symbolize the wounds of Christ during His Passion, which also exemplify the values of faith, hope, and charity. Banner; The banner in white (argent), features the bishop's motto (Ad Seminandum). Symbolism The upper portion of the coat of arms refers to his ministry as an ordained priest of the Roman Catholic Archdiocese of Manila for 27 years. The castle tower and the first marine lion in white (argent) are part of the seal of the archdiocese while the oyster and the second marine lion are part of the seal of Manila. The tower represents God Himself. The three windows represent the three Persons of the Blessed Holy Trinity. The marine lions signify the heritage of Manila and the Philippines as an ultramar (overseas) territory of the Spanish Empire for more than 300 years. These creatures bear pilgrim crosses instead of swords to signify the journey of the People of God in the world through a pilgrimage of faith. The pearl inside the oyster speaks of the bishop's nationality, coming from the Philippines, the "Pearl of the Orient". It also speaks of St. John the Baptist, in whose feast Manila City was founded. It also represents the beginning of the Bishop's episcopal ministry when he became Bishop of Balanga on April 1, 2010. The blue background represents the sea and of the devotion of Filipino Catholics to the Blessed Virgin Mary. The symbols at the base point of this section represent personal devotions and the origins of the bishop. The rod with a fish tied to it represents St. Raphael the Archangel who in Old Testament (cf. Tobit 6) assists a blind Tobit while fishing. St. Raphael is the namesake of the town of San Rafael, Bulacan where the bishop came from. The pilgrim's bell that also hangs from the staff signifies St. Anthony the Abbot. The Bishop became the first Parish Priest of San Antonio Abad Parish, Pasig. The rod with budding lilies signifies the personal devotion of the bishop to St. Joseph, Spouse of the Virgin Mary, who is also the patron saint of the diocese he previously served for 13 years which is Diocese of Balanga. The lilies also speak St. Nicholas of Tolentino who is also special to the bishop as he was ordained on his feast day on September 10, 1983, with St. Nicholas is the patron saint of Mariveles, Bataan where he served as parish administrator of the Diocesan Shrine of St. Nicholas Tolentino Church from June 5, 2020 to June 4, 2023. The book contains the Latin phrase "Via, Veritas, et Vita Est", which in English is "He is the Way, the Truth, and the Life" (John 14:6) referring to Christ, the principal exemplar of the Bishop in his ministry. It is also a memorial to his ministry as Bishop of Balanga in Bataan. In the coat of arms of the Diocese of Balanga, three young men read books containing these words that represent the name of the province "Bataan". Previous versions Bishop of Balanga (April 2010–July 22, 2023)

== See also ==
- Catholic Church in the Philippines

Academic offices
Preceded by Romulo Vergara	Rector of Pontificio Collegio Filippino; 1999 – July 8, 2010	Succeeded by Gregory Ramon D. Gaston
Catholic Church titles
Preceded by Socrates B. Villegas	Bishop of Balanga; April 1, 2010 – July 22, 2023	Succeeded by Rufino C. Sescon, Jr.
Preceded by Gerardo Gregorio P. Jorge	Parish Administrator of Diocesan Shrine and Parish Church of Saint Nicholas de Tolentino, Mariveles, Bataan; June 5, 2020 – June 4, 2023	Succeeded by Regin L. Tenorio
Preceded by Francisco M. de Leon	Bishop of Antipolo; July 22, 2023 – present	Incumbent
