= Jesse Mercado =

Filipino bishop

The Most Reverend Jesse Eugenio Mercado D.D.
- Bishop Emeritus of Parañaque
- See: Parañaque
- Appointed: December 7, 2002
- Installed: January 28, 2003
- Term ended: June 6, 2026
- Previous posts: Auxiliary Bishop of Manila (1997–2002); Titular Bishop of Talaptula (1997–2002); Apostolic Administrator of Antipolo (2002–2003)

Orders
- Ordination: March 19, 1977 by Jaime Sin
- Consecration: March 31, 1997 by Jaime Sin

Personal details
- Born: Jesse Eugenio Mercado; June 6, 1951 (age 75) Santa Cruz, Manila, Philippines
- Denomination: Roman Catholic
- Motto: Confirma Fratres Tuos ('Strengthen your Brethren', Luke 22:32)
- Coat of arms

Styles of Jesse Mercado
- Reference style: The Most Reverend
- Spoken style: Your Excellency
- Religious style: Bishop

Jesse Eugenio Mercado (born June 6, 1951) is a Filipino prelate who last served as the first bishop of Roman Catholic Diocese of Parañaque from 2002 until his resignation in 2026.

== Early life and education ==
Mercado was born on June 6, 1951, in Santa Cruz, Manila, and grew up in Caloocan. He studied at St. Joseph School and completed his philosophical and theological formation at the Jesuit-run San Jose Seminary. From 1981 to 1984, he took his licentiate in theology at the Angelicum in Rome.

== Ministry ==
Mercado was ordained to the priesthood on March 19, 1977, for the Archdiocese of Manila. There, he served as Assistant Parish Priest of San Isidro Labrador Parish in Pasay (1977), Spiritual Director at the San Pablo Regional Seminary in Baguio (1977–1979), Director of the Pre-College Department (1979–1981) and Professor of Theology (1985–1988) at the San Carlos Seminary, Rector of the Holy Apostles Senior Seminary (1988–1994), and Rector of the Pontificio Collegio Filippino (1994–1997).

== Episcopate ==
Pope John Paul II named Mercado as Titular Bishop of Talaptula and Auxiliary Bishop of Manila on February 25, 1997, and was ordained on March 31 of the same year. As Auxiliary Bishop, he was assigned as District Bishop for Pasay-Parañaque-Las Piñas-Muntinlupa (PPLM) District.

Pope John Paul II subsequently appointed Mercado as the first and founding bishop of the Diocese of Parañaque on December 7, 2002, and formally installed on January 28, 2003. At the Catholic Bishops' Conference of the Philippines (CBCP), he served as chairperson of the Episcopal Commission on the Laity and the Episcopal Commission on Family and Life.

On June 6, 2026, Mercado stepped down as Bishop of Parañaque upon reaching the mandatory retirement age of 75 for bishops, becoming the last retiring bishop of the original five dioceses created from the Archdiocese of Manila. Elias Ayuban, the Bishop of Cubao, was named as the diocese's apostolic administrator.

Academic offices
Preceded by Ramon Arguelles	Rector of Pontificio Collegio Filippino; 1994–1997	Succeeded by Honesto Ongtioco
Catholic Church titles
New title	Bishop of Parañaque; 2003–2026	Sede vacante
Preceded by Clément Fecteau	Titular Bishop of Talaptula; 1997–2003	Succeeded by Isabelo Caiban Abarquez
