= Diocesan Shrine of Saint Paul of the Cross =

Minor Basilica and Diocesan Shrine of Saint Paul of the Cross Santuario Diocesano del San Pablo de la Cruz
- Minor Basilica and Diocesan Shrine of Saint Paul of the Cross; Santuario Diocesano del San Pablo de la Cruz
- 14°38′24.1″N 121°07′14.2″E
- Location: SSS Village, Concepcion Dos, Marikina
- Country: Philippines
- Denomination: Roman Catholic

History
- Status: Minor basilica, Diocesan shrine
- Founded: 1975
- Dedication: Paul of the Cross
- Consecrated: October 20, 2018; 7 years ago

Architecture
- Groundbreaking: 2012; 14 years ago
- Completed: September 2018; 7 years ago

Administration
- Archdiocese: Manila
- Diocese: Antipolo
- Deanery: Our Lady of the Abandoned
- Parish: Saint Paul of the Cross

Clergy
- Rector: Rev. Fr. Vicentico Flores Jr.

The Minor Basilica and Diocesan Shrine of Saint Paul of the Cross is a Roman Catholic minor basilica in Marikina, Metro Manila, Philippines.

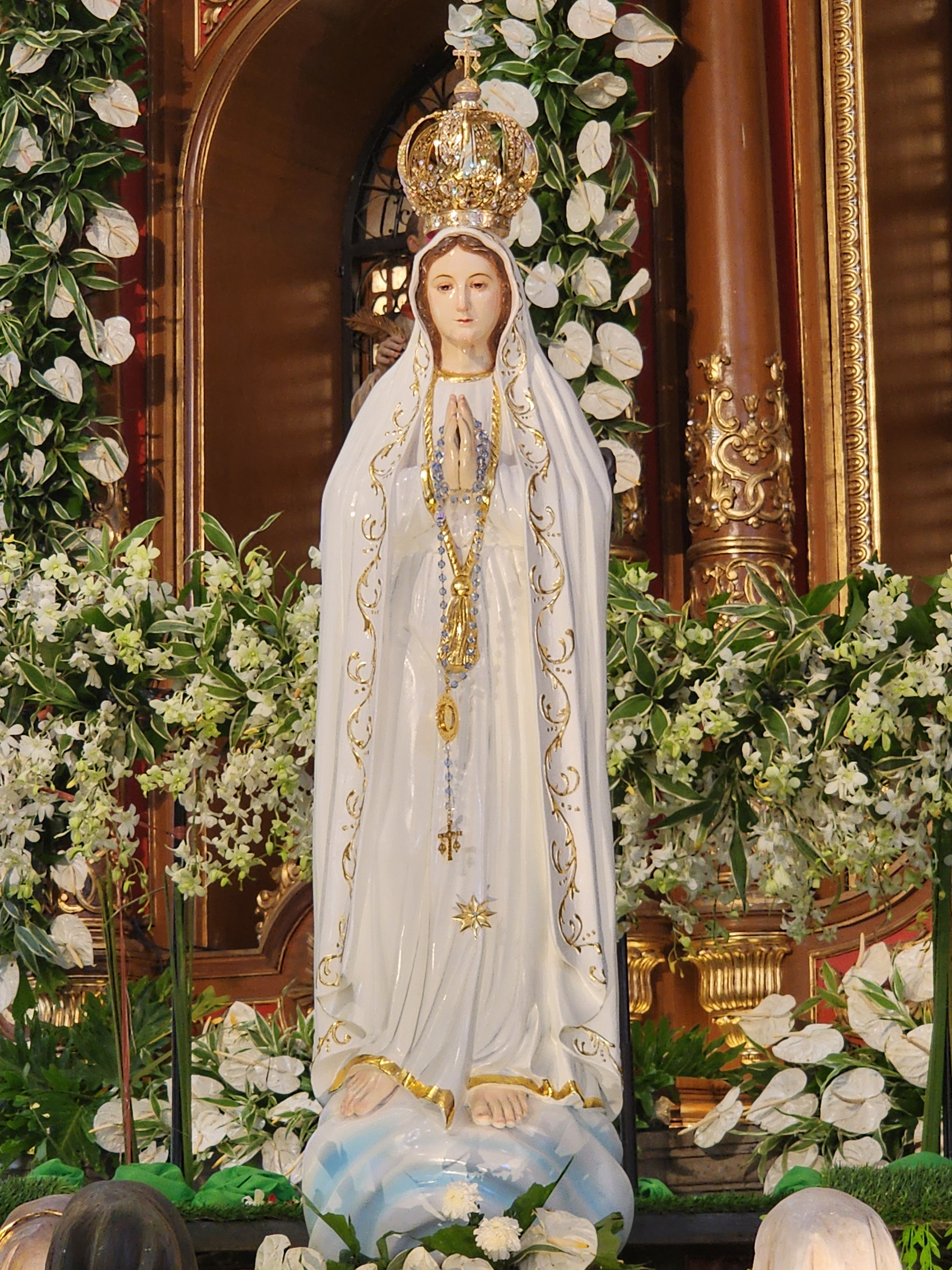
Nuestra Señora de Fátima de Marikina. The Secondary Patroness of the Minor Basilica and Diocesan Shrine-Parish of St. Paul of the Cross

== History ==
The Diocesan Shrine of Saint Paul of the Cross was established as a parish in 1975. It was run by the Passionist priests until it was turned over to the Diocese of Antipolo in 2004. It was elevated to a diocesan shrine on 19 March 2021.

Pope Leo XIV raised the shrine to the status of Minor Basilica on 13 May 2025 at the request of Antipolo bishop Ruperto Santos.

== Pontifical coronation ==
The church is the oldest in the Philippines to be dedicated to the Catholic saint, Paul of the Cross. The church is also the host of the pontifically crowned image of Our Lady of Fatima of Marikina, which was pontifically crowned by Pope Francis in 2024.
