= Balanga Cathedral =

Latin Catholic cathedral in Bataan

- Cathedral-Shrine of Saint Joseph, Husband of Mary; Cathedral-Shrine Parish of Saint Joseph
- Katedral-Dambana at Parokyang Katedral ni San Jose (Filipino); Catedral-Santuario y Parroquial de San José (Spanish)
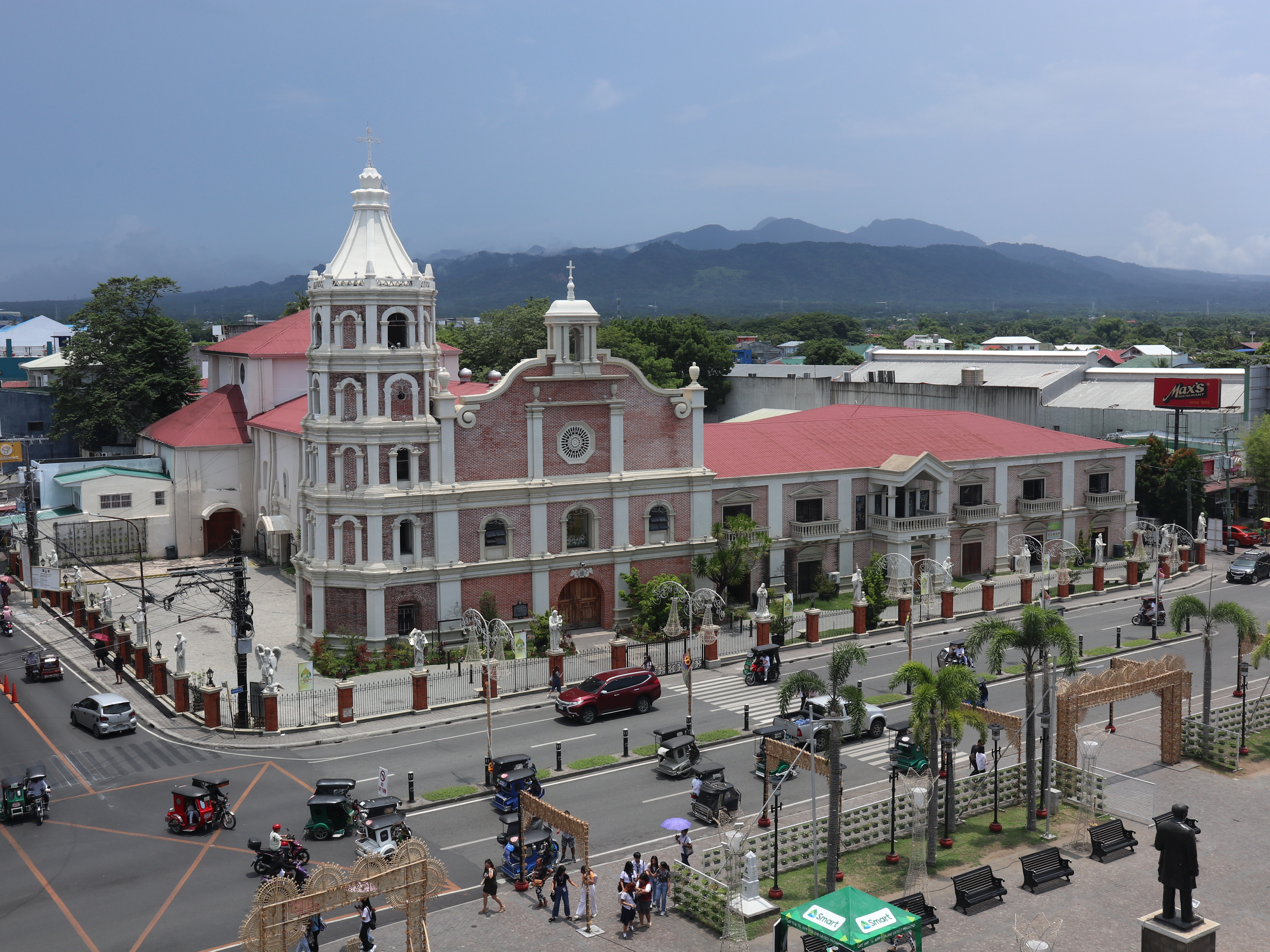
- Balanga Cathedral in 2023

- Location in Luzon Location in the Philippines
- 14°40′45″N 120°32′25″E
- Location: Brgy. Poblacion, Balanga, Bataan
- Country: Philippines
- Denomination: Latin Catholic
- Website: Facebook page

History
- Former name(s): Parish of St. Joseph (1793–November 8, 1975); Cathedral-Parish of St. Joseph (November 8, 1975–March 19, 2015)
- Founded: 1793
- Dedication: Saint Joseph
- Consecrated: March 17, 2005

Architecture
- Functional status: Active
- Architectural type: Church building
- Style: Baroque

Administration
- Division: Vicariate of Our Lady of the Pillar
- Province: San Fernando
- Metropolis: San Fernando
- Archdiocese: San Fernando
- Diocese: Balanga
- Parish: Saint Joseph

Clergy
- Archbishop: Florentino G. Lavarias
- Bishop: Rufino C. Sescon, Jr.
- Rector: Noel Nuguid
- Vicar: John Carlo Vizon

The Cathedral-Shrine of Saint Joseph, Husband of Mary, commonly known as Balanga Cathedral, in Balanga, Bataan, is the seat of the Diocese of Balanga which comprises entire of the civil province of Bataan, Philippines. Currently, Noel Nuguid and John Carlo Vizon serve as the cathedral priests.

It was originally named as Parish of St. Joseph until November 8, 1975, when Bataan was under the Archdiocese of San Fernando until Bishop Celso Nogoy Guevarra became first Bishop of Balanga, separating the province from an archdiocese and converting it into a cathedral of the province's own Catholic jurisdiction Diocese of Balanga. On March 19, 2015, the cathedral was formally declared a diocesan shrine, changing its status from cathedral-parish to cathedral-shrine.

== Structure, interior, and exterior ==
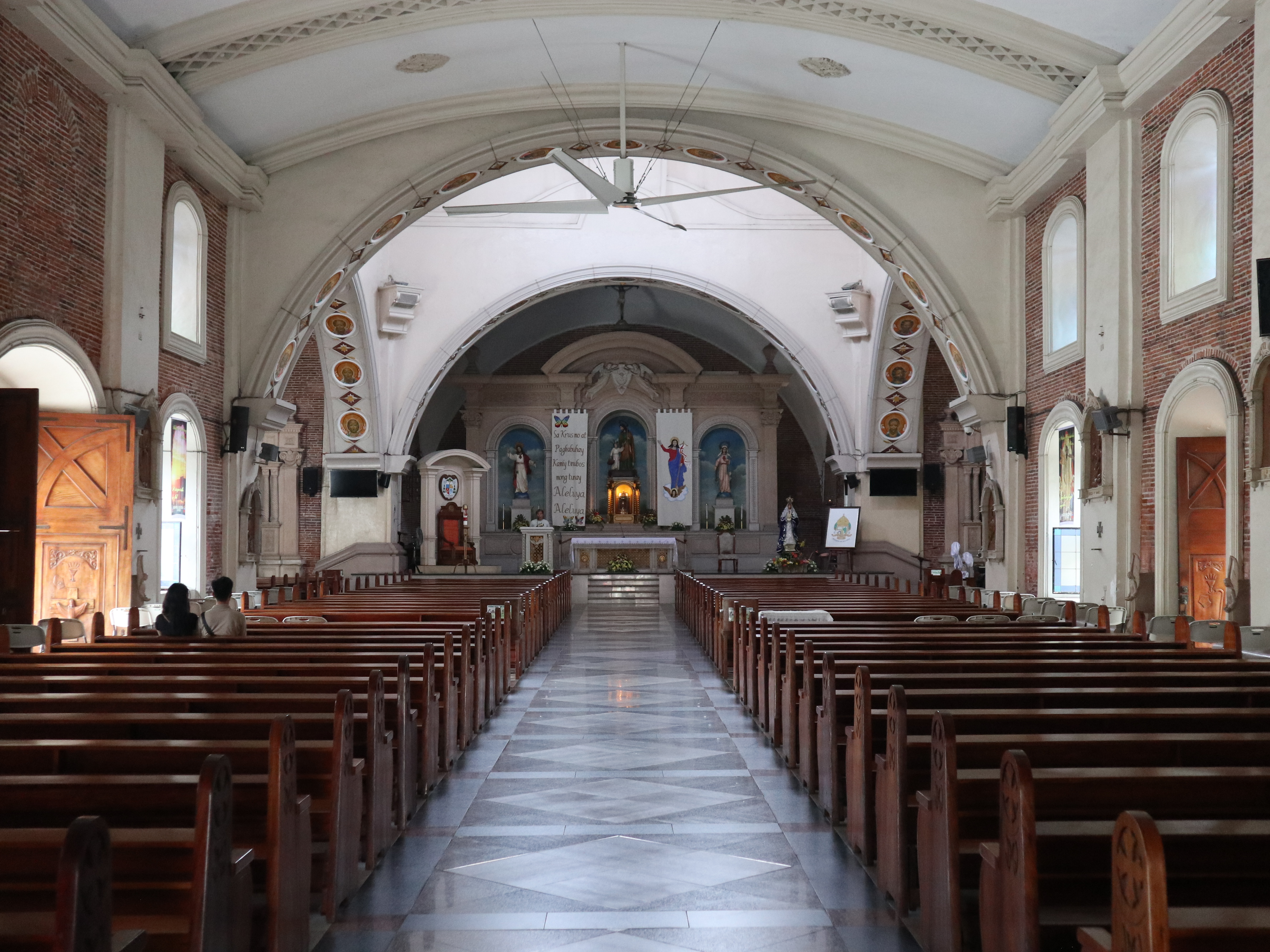
Church interior in 2023

The present church structure of Balanga is credited to Fray Benito Rivas OP, parish priest of Balanga from 1869 to 1876. From this remodeling, the good friar added transepts and a dome to the church, contributing to its current appearance. Archival photos also show that this construction update also gave its altar a two-tiered baldachin for a retablo similar to those found at St. Peter's Basilica in Vatican City, something that is not common, if not one-of-a-kind in the whole archipelago. Aside from his contributions to the church construction, Fray Rivas is also recognized for his contributions to the livelihood of the people of Balanga.

The original cathedral exterior and facade had no bricks and cross at the top with both of them were added in 1995 under Bishopb Celso Guevarra, white color, and the stone tablet of Ten Commandments which was removed during its redesign. Its interior, however, was wider, and colored green and gold, with the bishop's chair that was added when the church changed from its status as parish under Archdiocese of San Fernando, Pampanga to Diocese of Balanga's own cathedral upon Guevarra became the latter's first bishop on November 8, 1975, at the center (later at its current left) which remain unchanged even after the facade was changed for another nine years until Socrates Villegas renovated it from October 2004 to 2005 where the cathedra now became narrower, colored marble white, and the chair has red with golden border. After the interior changed, the former movable bishop's chair became the priest's chair. The golden border was present until it was removed when Bishop Ruperto Santos (appointed April 1, 2010) installed into office as the fourth bishop of Balanga on July 8, 2010. The chair's clothing retained its red color until it changed to orange color with a cross at its backrest in 2015. The red color again returned in February 2025 during preparations for the installation ceremony of Santos' successor Rufino Sescon and later the cross stitch was removed three months after in May 2025 when Sescon was already the diocese's fifth bishop.

During sede vacante without a bishop installed in office when Bishop Honesto Ongtioco became Bishop of Cubao in Quezon City on August 28, 2003, until Santos assumed office on July 8, 2010, under the sede vacante diocesan administrators Antonio "Tony" S. Dumaual and Victor Ocampo, the bishop's seat is not covered and only the coat of arms of the previous bishop was removed. Since Ruperto Santos became Bishop of Antipolo covering the province of Rizal and Marikina in Metro Manila on July 22, 2023, and under the apostolic administration of Archbishop of San Fernando Florentino Lavarias, the bishop's chair was covered with white cloth due to the diocese's temporary governance is at the archbishop acting as the temporary head rather than to a local college of consultors including the locally designated or appointed diocesan administrator that lasted until the cathedral preparation for Sescon's installation in February 2025. The coat of arms of a bishop currently in office is also removed if there is another person to be seated on a cathedra and not the Bishop of Balanga himself.

Bishop Villegas saw that the decorations were in bad shape; therefore in October 2004 five months after Villegas was appointed as third Bishop of Balanga on May 3, 2004, and three months after he assumed office as bishop on July 3, 2004, he renovated the inside with a new design. The new design was made by Bezalel Construction, Inc. who was the contractor for the changes and improvements within the cathedral for 15 years until Villegas' successor Ruperto Santos in May 2019.

In 2008, 15 life-size images of saints with their names were added outside the cathedral representing the patron saints from the 11 towns and one city of Bataan where the Diocese of Balanga has jurisdiction with and a few towns have multiple saints (with Gemma Galgani was later added as the 16th and latest statue in 2013 during the tenure of Ruperto Santos). He also added a columbarium on the cathedral's garden and removed moss along its façade by putting a new paint into it. In 2009 months before Villegas became archbishop of Lingayen-Dagupan in Pangasinan on November 4 of that year, images featuring the ancestors of Jesus at the sides of a cathedral's dome and image of Jesus Christ at the dome itself were added.

During the tenure of Ruperto Santos as fourth bishop from April 1, 2010, to July 22, 2023, he made preparations, together with sede vacante diocesan administrator Victor Ocampo, for his taking of office from July 5 to 8, 2010 by placing his coat of arms at the cathedral floor, the first to be added after the cathedral 2004–2005 renovation, and cathedra and the latter removed a golden from the said renovation under Santos' predecessor Villegas, improved the patio and exterior area of the cathedral, and numerous vendors were discouraged within its premises. In early 2012, the cathedral's exterior was changed from a boundary wall to a fence. Due to St. Gemma Galgani Church in Mt. View, Mariveles, Bataan becoming a parish on July 21, 2012, which included on a roster of the diocese's churches and parishes, a statue of her was added outside the cathedral the following year in 2013. More images were added at the cathedral's parking area as its front only has the capacity of 16. Pavement of the ground on the exterior was made from 2017 to 2018, the belfry added the bricks in 2019, and the side exterior walls of the cathedral were repainted. In 2020, the cathedral's roof were painted from green and white to red. Pipe organs were also added on the cathedral's choir loft. Months before Santos became Bishop of Antipolo on July 22, 2023, the cathedral's leftmost entrance was blocked with a wall but the door is still present.

During the sede vacante period between Bishops Ruperto Santos and Rufino Sescon Jr. from July 22, 2023, to March 1, 2025, and under Florentino Lavarias and tenure of Fr. Noel Niguid as cathedral's rector and parish priest, the cathedral made several changes which are the repainting of its exterior five years after it was last repainted in 2019 and later the altar and cathedra reverted some of their original color by adding them a gold color over the current design made by the then third Bishop of Balanga Socrates Villegas in October 2024. This was in preparations for the diocese's 50th anniversary celebrations on March 18, 2025, 17 days after Sescon became the diocese's bishop which was presided by Apostolic Nuncio to the Philippines Charles John Brown, Lavarias, Teodoro Bacani Jr., and the former bishops Honesto Ongtioco and Socrates Villegas. At the last few months of Lavarias as apostolic administrator, the wall at the left door under Santos was removed, restoring the area's again passable to the public.

== Feast of the patron saint ==
The feast day of Saint Joseph is celebrated twice annually in the city of Balanga, on March 19 and the pistang bayan every April 28.

== Cathedral officials ==
=== Bishops of Balanga (installed in office) ===
No.	Portrait	Name	Coat of Arms	Period in Office	Duration
1		Celso Nogoy; Guevarra; 1923–2002		November 8, 1975– June 18, 1998	22 years, 7 months, 4 days (8,258 days)
2		Honesto Flores "Ness" Ongtioco; 1948–		June 18, 1998– August 28, 2003	5 years, 2 months, 10 days (1,897 days)
3		Socrates Buenaventura "Soc" Villegas; 1960– (appointed May 3, 2004)		July 3, 2004– November 4, 2009	5 years, 4 months, 1 day (1,950 days)
4		Ruperto Cruz "Stude" Santos; 1957– (appointed April 1, 2010)		July 8, 2010– July 22, 2023	13 years, 14 days (4,762 days)
5		Rufino Coronel "Jun" Sescon Jr. 1972–		March 1, 2025– present	

=== Sede vacante administrators (period without a bishop in office) ===
For administrators started at the date of a current bishop stepping down and ended upon the successor takes either office if diocesan administrator or both position and office if apostolic, end date calculation is used to indicate the transition period between bishops in office. Otherwise, it is not used if an administrator started days after the previous bishop ended its tenure.

Incumbent	Tenure	Duration	Last Bishop in Office	Next Bishop in Office
Diocesan Administrators (without a bishop installed in office; August 28, 2003–present)
Antonio "Tony" S. Dumaual † (died July 21, 2023, and funeral July 31, 2023)	August 28, 2003 – July 3, 2004	10 months, 6 days (311 days)	Honesto Ongtioco	Socrates Villegas
Victor "Vic" dela Cruz Ocampo †(died March 16, 2023, and funeral March 27, 2023)	November 5, 2009 – July 8, 2010	8 months, 3 days (245 days)	N/A (administrator appointed after Socrates Villegas stepped down as third Bishop of Balanga on November 5, 2009)	Ruperto Santos
Apostolic Administrators (temporary bishops; July 22, 2023–present)
Incumbent	Tenure	Duration	Last Bishop	Next Bishop
Florentino Galang "Dong Lavarias (Archbishop of San Fernandp, Pampanga since October 27, 2014)	July 22, 2023 – March 1, 2025	1 year, 7 months, 8 days (589 days)	Ruperto Santos	Rufino Sescon

=== Cathedral Rectors and Parish Priests ===
==== Archdiocese of Manila era (February 6, 1579 – December 11, 1948) ====
- Rev. Fr. Mariano Sarili (1898)
- Rev. Fr. Benito Rivas
- Rev. Fr. Juan Antonio Vicente
- Rev. Fr. Ma. Miñano (1938–1945)

==== Diocese of Balanga era (November 8, 1975 – present; cathedral status) ====
- Rev. Msgr. Hernando B. Guanzon (August 4, 2002 – October 22, 2005)

===== During the 6-years term of the diocese (October 22, 2005 – present) =====
- 2005–2011: Rev. Fr. Percival V. Medina (October 22, 2005 – June 5, 2011)
- 2011–2017: Rev. Fr. Abraham SP. Pantig (June 5, 2011 – June 5, 2017)
- 2017–2023: Rev. Fr. Ernesto de Leon (June 5, 2017 – June 5, 2023)
- 2023–present: Rev. Fr. Noel Niguid (June 5, 2023 – Present)

== Timeline of officials ==
* indicates the overall position tenure start date of a particular Bishop of Balanga upon appointment by the pope if the sede vacante administrator is a priest and not the bishop or archbishop from another diocese or an archdiocese, respectively. With those bishops, starting of position and installation into office are separate.

== See also ==
- Catholic Church in the Philippines
- Diocese of Balanga
