= Rufino Sescon =

Filipino Catholic prelate (born 1972)

His Excellency, The Most Reverend Rufino Coronel Sescon Jr. O.P.
- Bishop of Balanga
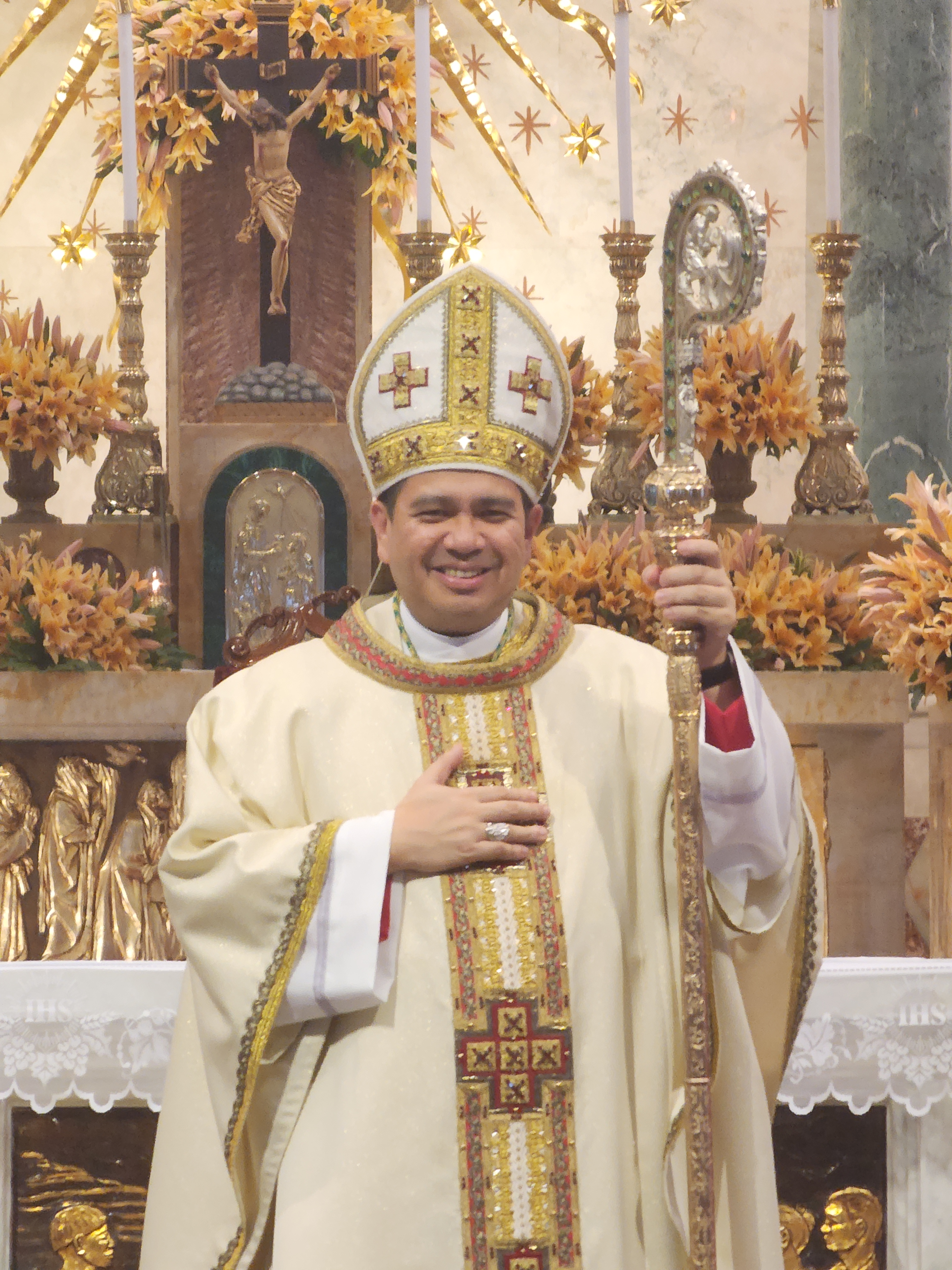
- Sescon in 2025
- Church: Catholic Church
- Province: San Fernando
- See: Balanga
- Appointed: December 3, 2024
- Installed: March 1, 2025
- Predecessor: Ruperto Santos
- Successor: Incumbent
- Previous posts: Priest, Archdiocese of Manila (1998–2025); Rector, Quiapo Church (2022–2025)

Orders
- Ordination: September 19, 1998 by Jaime Sin
- Consecration: February 25, 2025 by Socrates Villegas

Personal details
- Born: Rufino Coronel Sescon, Jr. April 20, 1972 (age 54) Manila, Philippines
- Education: Colegio de San Juan de Letran; San Carlos Seminary
- Motto: Gratia (Latin for 'Grace') (Note: From Romans 4:16 and St. Thérèse of Lisieux, "Everything is a Grace")
- Coat of arms: Rufino Coronel Sescon Jr.'s coat of arms

Ordination history
History
Diaconal ordination
- Ordained by: Jaime Sin
Priestly ordination
- Ordained by: Jaime Sin
Episcopal consecration
- Principal consecrator: Socrates Villegas
- Co-consecrators: Ruperto Santos; Honesto Ongtioco

Styles of Rufino C. Sescon, Jr.
- Reference style: His Excellency; The Most Reverend
- Spoken style: Your Excellency
- Religious style: Bishop

Rufino "Jun" Coronel Sescon Jr. OP (born April 20, 1972) is a Filipino prelate of the Catholic Church and a professed member of the Dominican Order. He is the fifth Bishop of Balanga since March 1, 2025, having been appointed by Pope Francis on December 3, 2024 during the diocese's 2-year temporary bishopric of Florentino Lavarias, Archbishop of San Fernando, Pampanga since October 27, 2014, as sede vacante apostolic administrator and succeeded Ruperto Santos who became fifth Bishop of Antipolo on July 22, 2023.

Ordained to the priesthood in 1998, Sescon served as the personal secretary of then-Manila Archbishop Cardinal Jaime Sin. He eventually rose to become one of the Philippines' most prominent preachers throughout his tenure as rector of Quiapo Church. He is also the executive director of the Catholic Mass Media Awards and a member of the Presbyteral Council of the Archdiocese of Manila.

== Early life and education ==
Rufino Coronel Sescon Jr. was born on April 20, 1972, in Manila, Philippines. He was baptized by Rev. Fr. Ramon Arguelles at the San Jose de Navotas Parish in Navotas (then part of Rizal) on May 6, 1972. An alumnus of Colegio de San Juan de Letran, he then studied philosophy and theology in San Carlos Seminary, where he obtained master's degrees in both disciplines.

== Ministry ==
=== 1998–2025: Diaconate and priesthood ===
Sescon was ordained to the diaconate on March 21, 1998, by Cardinal Jaime Sin, then-archbishop of Manila. He was then subsequently assigned as the parish deacon of the Sacred Heart of Jesus Parish Church in Santa Mesa, Manila, as well as the financial officer of the Sta. Mesa Parochial School, now known as the Sacred Heart of Jesus Catholic School.

On September 19, 1998, Sescon was ordained to the priesthood by Cardinal Sin. He then served as Sin's assistant secretary, and later, his personal secretary from 2001 (when Socrates Villegas, Sin's former secretary, became auxiliary bishop of Manila) until his death in 2005. In 2005, he was named chaplain of the Santo Niño de Paz Greenbelt Chapel in Makati. He also served as chancellor of the Archdiocese of Manila from 2008 to 2015, as well as the administrator of the Archbishop's Palace (Cardinal Sin's former residence) in Villa San Miguel, Mandaluyong. In 2013, he was appointed as the first priest-in-charge (chaplain) of Mary Mother of Hope Chapel at Landmark Makati. His chaplaincy at both Greenbelt and Landmark Chapels ended in 2022.

On September 28, 2020, he joined the Priestly Fraternities of St. Dominic, a society of apostolic life under the Order of Preachers.

His last pastoral assignment as priest was at Quiapo Church in Manila, when he was appointed by Cardinal Jose Advincula as its rector and parish priest in 2022. He also served as a member of the archdiocese's presbyteral council and as the episcopal vicar for the city of Manila.

Sescon was instrumental in elevating Quiapo Church as a national shrine in a process that took five months from the start of its application in February 2023 to the approval of the Catholic Bishops' Conference of the Philippines (CBCP) in July. Under his pastoral leadership, the Feast of Jesús Nazareno, once a parochial feast in Quiapo, was celebrated in the whole Philippine Catholic Church for the first time in 2025.

=== 2025–present: Bishop of Balanga ===
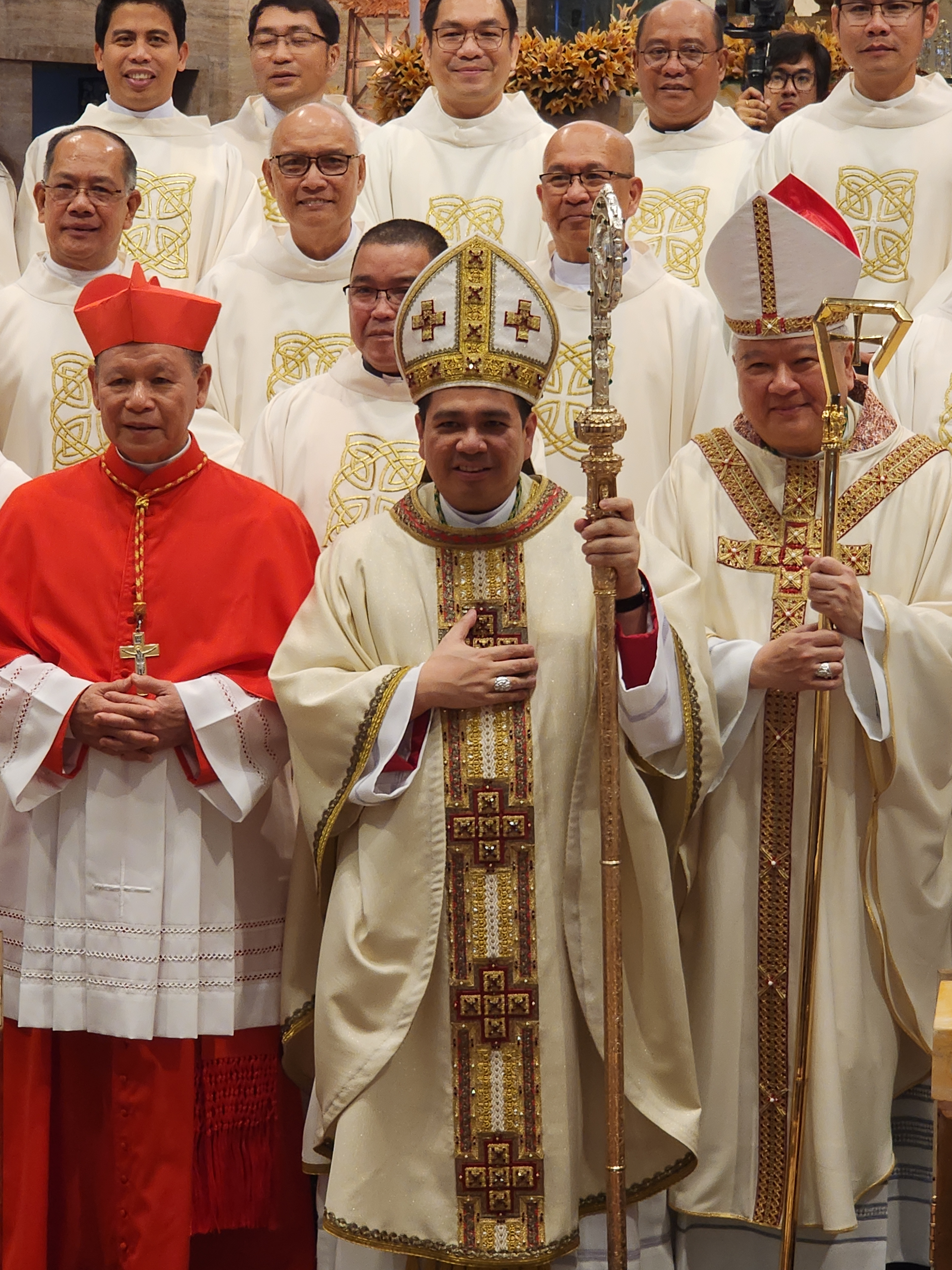
Bishop Sescon (center) with Cardinal Jose Advincula (left) and Archbishop Socrates Villegas (right), and accompanying priests in the background.

On December 3, 2024, Pope Francis appointed Sescon as the fifth Bishop of Balanga, succeeding Ruperto Santos, who vacated the diocese on July 22, 2023, to lead the Diocese of Antipolo. His episcopal ordination took place on February 25, 2025—the 39th anniversary of the People Power Revolution—at the Manila Cathedral. Archbishop Socrates Villegas, together with bishops Ruperto Santos and Honesto Ongtioco as co-consecrators, ordained Sescon to the episcopate. All of his consecrators were former bishops of Balanga.

During his ordination, Sescon received the crozier from Villegas, who inherited it from Cardinal Sin. This crozier was also used by José María Cuenco, then-Archbishop of Jaro.

Sescon chose to be ordained on the People Power Revolution anniversary as a "form of prayer for generosity" to "never forget" the spirit of the revolution. According to him, the spirit continues because of the people's faith that impels them to be generous and become the "conscience of society." He described the 1986 uprising as not only of "people power," but of "prayer power." Sescon also said:

When genuine faith, patriotism, selflessness, the common good, and unity— genuine unity—pervade among us against tyranny, dishonesty, corruption, and injustice, miracles will happen.

Preparations for his installation at the Balanga Cathedral in Balanga, Bataan were made from February to March 1, 2025, where his coat of arms were placed at the cathedral floor and cathedra, and the cathedra was changed from orange to red.

Sescon was formally installed as and became the fifth Bishop of Balanga on March 1, 2025. He was installed by Archbishop Charles John Brown, the Apostolic Nuncio to the Philippines, in the presence of Archbishop of San Fernando and outgoing Apostolic Administrator Florentino Lavarias, his consecrator Archbishop Villegas (the homilist), Cardinals Advincula and Pablo Virgilio David (Bishop of Kalookan and CBCP President), and government officials of the province of Bataan. The installation occurred one month before Pope Francis died and subsequent funeral from April 21 to 26, 2025.

In May 2025, the cross stitch at the cathedra, added in 2015 during the tenure of his predecessor Ruperto Santos, was removed, making it now similar to its design from July 5, 2010, to August 2015 under Santos.

He mandated the creation of one diocesan shrine which is Monte de Piedad (Divine Mercy) in Abucay on October 5, 2025, the first church to be elevated into higher status during his tenure as bishop.

On January 9, 2026, Sescon presided over the Misa Mayor (Eucharistic Celebration) at the Quirino Grandstand, marking the Feast of Jesus Nazareno. He took the place of Cardinal Jose Advincula, Archbishop of Manila, who was attending an extraordinary consistory called for by Pope Leo XIV in the Vatican on January 7–8, 2026. This marked a break from tradition of the Archbishop of Manila presiding over this Eucharist.

== Notes ==
Catholic Church titles
| Preceded by Hernando Coronel | Rector of Quiapo Church; November 21, 2022 – February 25, 2025 | Succeeded by Ramon Jade Licuanan |
| Preceded by Ruperto Santos | Bishop of Balanga; March 1, 2025 – present | Incumbent |
