= Talaptula =

Africa Proconsularis (125 AD)

Talaptula was an ancient Roman-Berber civitas of the province of Byzacena, which existed during the Roman era and late antiquity. The exact location of the town is unknown.

An ancient Catholic diocese was centered on the town, and it survives today as a titular bishopric of the Roman Catholic Church. The current bishop is Terence Brady (Australia), serving since 2007.
