= Pontificio Collegio Filippino =

Roman Catholic seminary in Rome, Italy

Coordinates: 41°53′50″N 12°25′16″E

- Pontifical Filipino College
- Coat of arms
- Latin: Pontificium Collegium Philippinum
- Motto: Sacerdotes Domini vocabimini (Isaiah 61:6)
- Motto in English: "(You) shall be called priests of the Lord"
- Type: Roman Catholic seminary, continuing formation institute, residence
- Established: 29 June 1961 (65 years ago)
- Affiliations: Catholic Bishops' Conference of the Philippines
- Rector: Gregory Ramon Gaston
- Location: 490 Via Aurelia, Rome, Italy (on property subject in part to Holy See extraterritorial jurisdiction)
- Website: www.pcfroma.org

The Pontificio Collegio Filippino (English: Pontifical Filipino College) is a college for diocesan priests from the Philippines studying at pontifical universities in Rome, Italy. It is also known as the Colegio de Nuestra Señora de la Paz y Buen Viaje, named after the college's patroness, Our Lady of Peace and Good Voyage.

Pope John XXIII established the institution with pontifical rights on 29 June 1961, through the Pontifical decree Sancta Mater Ecclesia.

Pope John Paul II decreed via Quo Plenius Atque on 9 December 1978 that virtuous Filipino seminarians from the Diocese of Tandag be sent to enroll at the college in perpetuity. The current rector of the college is Father Gregorio Ramon Gaston.

== History ==
Following the end of Spanish colonial rule, the Catholic Church in the Philippines faced disorder, with dioceses lacking bishops and parishes left without priests. In response, Pope Leo XIII issued the apostolic constitution Quæ Mari Sinico on 17 September 1902 to reorganize the Philippine church. The constitution included a section addressing the need for a native secular clergy and mandated training according to the standards of the Council of Trent, structured into what are now known as minor and major seminaries. Furthermore, the document envisioned the establishment of a "house in Rome" for Filipinos who sought to pursue advanced philosophical and theological studies. The Vatican intended these measures to prepare Filipinos to eventually replace the regular clergy in pastoral duties.

In a 1959 meeting, the Catholic hierarchy of the Philippines approved a resolution proposed by Cardinal Rufino Santos to establish a pontifical Philippine college in Rome. Bishop Mariano Madriaga stated the purpose was to provide Filipino seminarians and student priests a venue in Rome that offered a tailored environment, diet, and formation program while they pursued higher studies near Vatican City. The resolution was sent to the Holy See and approved by the prefect of the Sacred Congregation of Seminaries and Universities, Cardinal Giuseppe Pizzardo.

With permission from the Vatican, a lot for the college at Via Aurelia was purchased from the generalate of the De La Salle Brothers. The cornerstone was personally blessed by Pope John XXIII on 8 August 1959 at Castel Gandolfo, and laid the following day in a ceremony officiated by Pizzardo.

John XXIII formally established the college through the apostolic letter Sancta Mater Ecclesia on 29 June 1961 and inaugurated the edifice on 7 October 1961, the feast day of Our Lady of the Rosary. During the ceremony, the pope delivered an address and gifted the college a white stole, commemorative coins, and the rector's insignia of office. The institution was dedicated to Our Lady of Peace and Good Voyage.

The college opened with 18 student priests and 4 seminarians from various Philippine dioceses. Its inaugural leadership included American Passionist priest Reginald Arliss as rector, Manila diocesan priest Alfredo Rodriguez as vice rector and discipline prefect, and Vincentian priest Jesus Ma. Cavanna as spiritual director. Father Carmelo Morelos was the economus (treasurer). Household services were first managed by sisters from the Order of Servants of Mary in Ravenna.

In 1967, Filipino bishops discontinued the practice of sending seminarians to the college, choosing to send only priests for higher studies. In October 1973, the Missionary Sisters of Saint Dominic assumed the household duties previously managed by the Servite sisters.

Since its establishment, the college has produced several alumni who became bishops in the Philippines.

== Building ==
The college is located at 490 Via Aurelia in a suburb of Rome, occupying a property of 23,893.44 m^{2} (28,576.32 sq yd) between the Collegio Pio-Brasiliano and the Villa Pacelli. The building was designed by engineer Edoardo Cherubini.

=== Crypt chapel altar ===
To commemorate the 21 October 2012 canonization of Pedro Calungsod, the second Filipino saint, a commemorative retablo was installed in the college's crypt chapel. Crafted by Filipino sculptor Wilfredo Layug of Guagua, Pampanga, the work features relief murals depicting the martyrdoms of Calungsod and Lorenzo Ruiz, the Philippines' first saints. In the panel depicting Calungsod, the sculptor incorporated an image of Our Lady of Peace and Good Voyage, the college's patroness. The center panel includes angels depicted as Filipino women dressed in the traditional baro't saya. These figures were rendered in estofado, an artistic technique that simulates the look of textiles. Bamboo serves as a recurring motif throughout the retablo.

== List of rectors ==
1. Reginald Edward Vincent Arliss, CP (1961–1969)
2. Alfredo Rodriguez (1970–1978)
3. Godofredo Pedernal (1978–1980)
4. Ciceron Tumbocon (1980–1982)
5. Benjamin Almoneda (1982–1990)
6. Ramon Arguelles (1990–1994)
7. Jesse Mercado (1994–1997)
8. Honesto Ongtioco (1997 – 18 June 1998)
9. Romulo Vergara (1998–1999)
10. Ruperto Santos (1999 – 8 July 2010)
11. Gregory Ramon Gaston (2 September 2010 – present)
