= Florentino Lavarias =

Filipino Catholic prelate (born 1957)

The Most Reverend Florentino Lavarias D.D.
- Metropolitan Archbishop of San Fernando
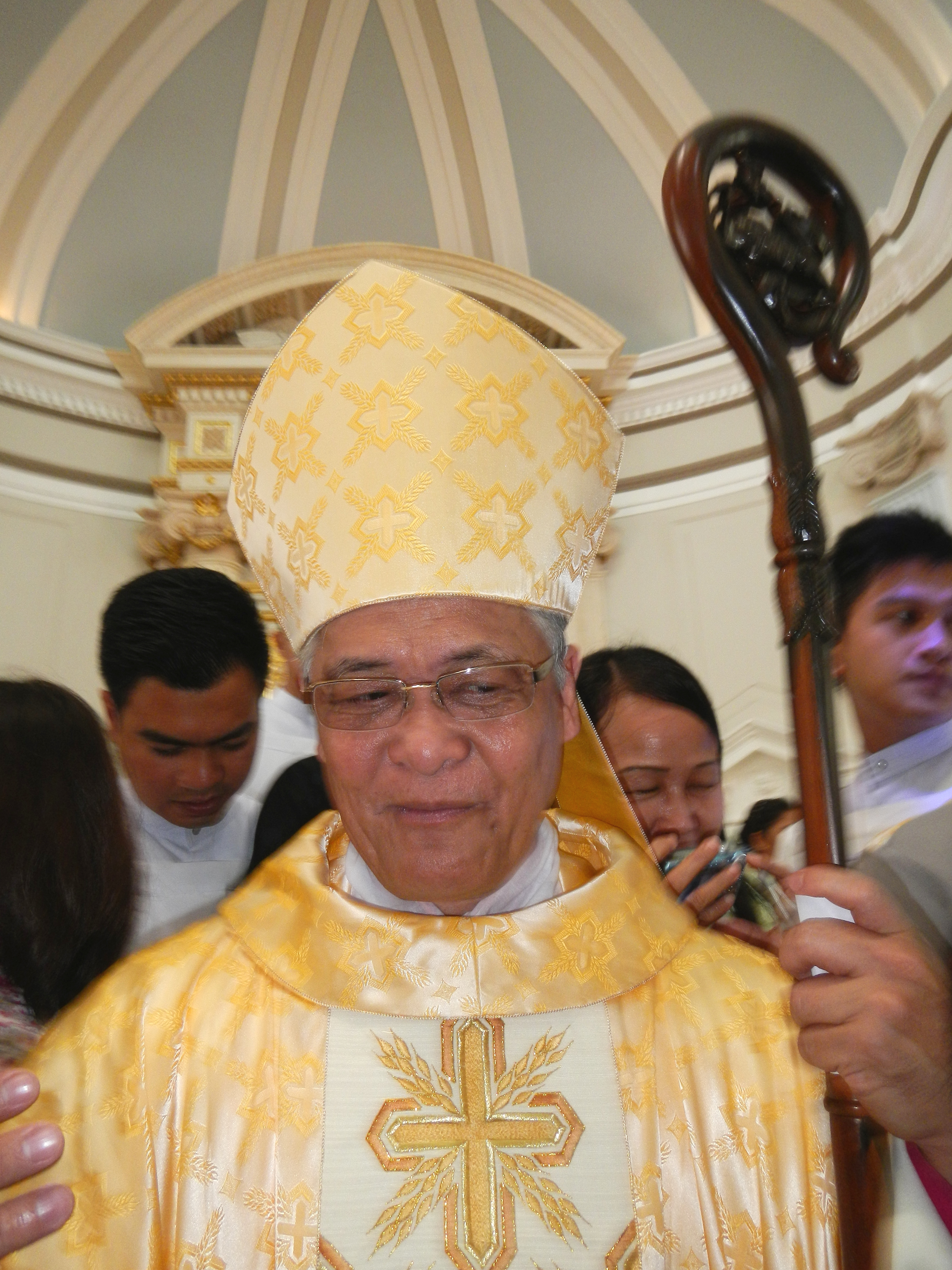
- Archbishop Lavarias during the Rite of Canonical Possession at the Metropolitan Cathedral of San Fernando.
- Church: Catholic
- Archdiocese: San Fernando
- Appointed: July 25, 2014
- Installed: October 27, 2014
- Predecessor: Paciano Aniceto
- Previous posts: Bishop of Iba (2004‍–‍2014); Apostolic Administrator of Balanga (2023‍–‍2025)

Orders
- Ordination: 26 September 1985 by Oscar Cruz
- Consecration: 12 August 2004 by Antonio Franco

Personal details
- Born: March 14, 1957 (age 69) Mabalacat, Pampanga, Philippines
- Education: Holy Angel University; San Carlos Seminary
- Motto: Voluntas Tua Delectatio Mea (Latin for 'Your Will is My Delight' – Psalms 40:8)
- Coat of arms

Styles of Florentino G. Lavarias
- Reference style: The Most Reverend
- Spoken style: Your Excellency
- Religious style: Archbishop

Florentino "Dong" Galang Lavarias is a Filipino prelate of the Catholic church. He is the fourth and current archbishop of San Fernando. He succeeded Paciano Aniceto as the Archbishop of San Fernando. Prior to his installation, he previously served as fourth bishop of Iba in Zambales from September 1, 2004 to October 27, 2014. He also served as the apostolic administrator of Diocese of Balanga in Bataan from July 22, 2023 to March 1, 2025.

== Biography ==
=== Early life and priesthood ===
Lavarias was born on March 14, 1957, in Santa Ines, Mabalacat. He graduated in college at the Holy Angel University in 1978 before entering the San Carlos Seminary. He was ordained a priest on September 26, 1985, at the Our Lady of Grace Parish. He served various parishes under the Archdiocese of San Fernando.

=== 2004–2014: Bishop of Iba ===
He was appointed bishop of Iba. He was consecrated on August 12, 2004, at the Metropolitan Cathedral of San Fernando. His consecrator was then the Apostolic Nuncio to the Philippines, Antonio Franco, while his co-consecrators were Paciano Aniceto and Gaudencio Rosales .

=== 2014–present: Archbishop of San Fernando ===
On October 27, 2014, Lavarias succeeded Paciano Aniceto as the latter resigned as Archbishop of San Fernando, Pampanga due to the age limit after being appointed by Pope Francis three months earlier on July 25, 2014.

==== 2023–2025: Apostolic Administrator of Balanga ====
Due to the departure of Ruperto Santos to become fifth Bishop of Antipolo covering Marikina in Metro Manila and the province of Rizal on July 22, 2023 which ended his tenure as fourth Bishop of Balanga from April 1, 2010, Lavarias was appointed by Pope Francis as sede vacante apostolic administrator or temporary bishop of the Diocese of Balanga and served the position until March 1, 2025, 16 days before the diocese turned 50 on March 17 of that year, when Rufino Sescon already became the fifth bishop, making him also the first archbishop's archdiocese to serve Bataan after the November 8, 1975 canonical erection of the diocese as well as returned the province's Catholic governance temporarily to San Fernando after 48–49 years.

During his 1 year, 7 months and 8 days temporary bishopric of the diocese, he ordained two seminarians leading to being deacons as a prerequisite for priesthood which are Tristan Ralf Pacheco and John Carlo Vizon on March 7, 2024 and January 18, 2025, respectively. He had available schedule to preside the Mount Samat Pilgimage in 2023 together with Socrates Villegas, the then-third bishop from May 3, 2004 to November 4, 2009 and now fifth Archbishop of Lingayen-Dagupan, making it the second pilgrimage to be celebrated during vacancy after 2009 under Villegas alone as guest presider only as his tenure as Bishop of Balanga already ended at the said date of November 2009 due to the situation mentioned before. Given both have their limitations on a schedule to celebrate the event, a pilgrimage was not held in 2024.

Lavarias appointed the two new officials of the Diocesan Schools of Bataan Educational Foundation, Inc. (DSOBEFI), an association of Catholic schools in Bataan, which are Rev. Fr. Edgardo Sigua (succeeding Roy Guila) and Alwin Bobis as superintendent and assistant superintendent on June 1, 2024, respectively.

One parish of the diocese was erected under Lavarias which is Quasi-San Antonio de Padua in Orion which established on March 28, 2024, the Holy Thursday of that year. The parish covers barangays Daan Pari, Puting Buhangin, and Santa Elena. Its church building is located along Roman Superhighway just before entering the Bataan National Road and began construction in 2022 during the final years of Santos as the diocese's bishop and continued throughout Lavarias and Sescon as such the final church to be built under Santos.

From February to March 1, 2025, Lavarias, together with Sescon, both oversaw the preparations for the installation ceremony where his coat of arms were placed at the floor of Balanga Cathedral and cathedra, and the latter changed its color from orange to red and added gold color on the designs with cross stitch from Sescon's predecessor Santos retaining until May 2025 when the former already stepped down as administrator.

Catholic Church titles
Preceded by Paciano B. Aniceto	Archbishop of San Fernando; October 27, 2014–present	Succeeded by Incumbent
