= Honesto Ongtioco =

Filipino prelate (born 1948)

His Excellency, The Most Reverend Honesto Ongtioco D.D., STL
- Bishop Emeritus of Cubao
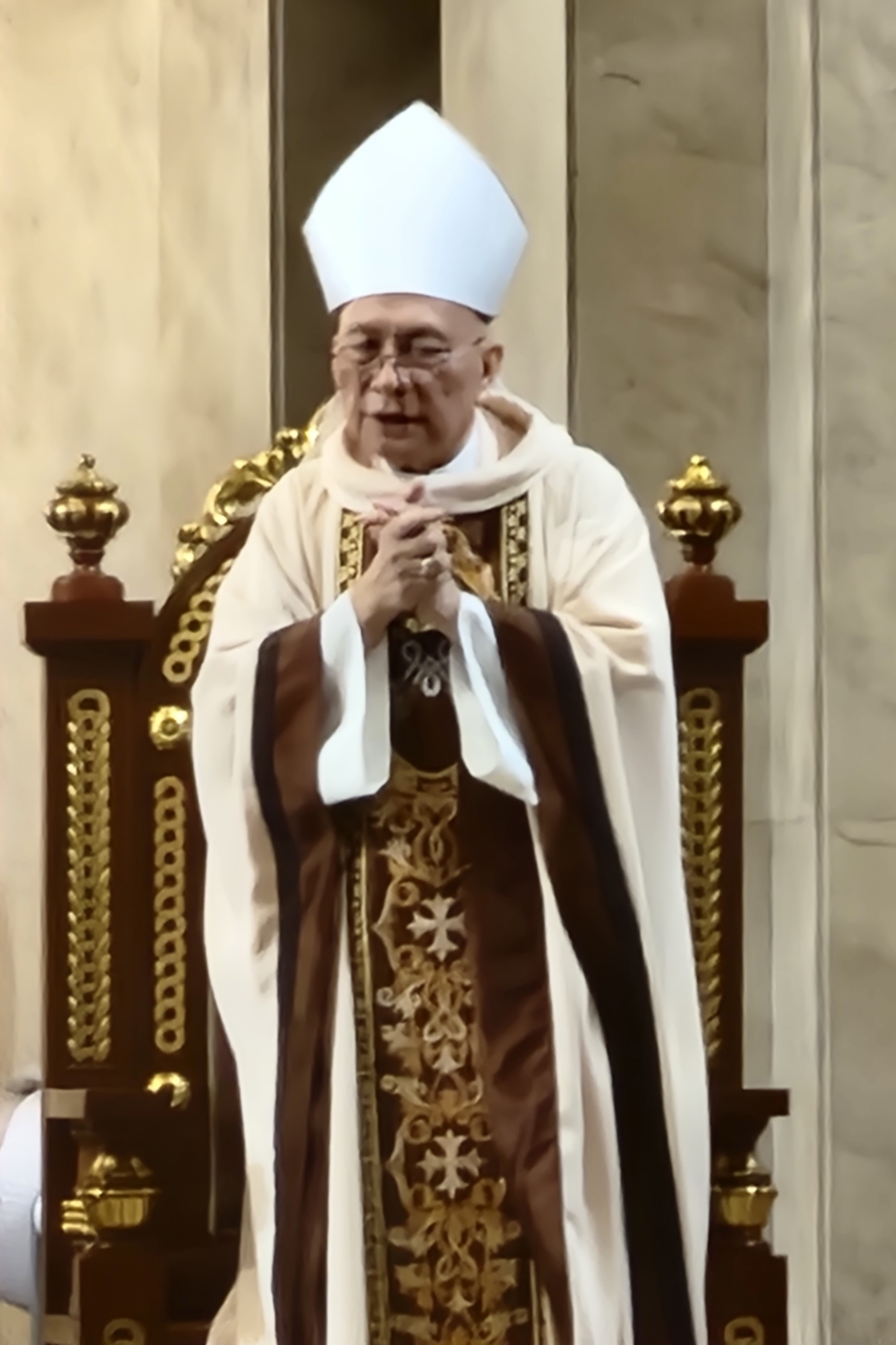
- Ongtioco in 2023
- Church: Catholic Church
- Province: Manila
- See: Cubao
- Appointed: June 28, 2003
- Installed: August 28, 2003
- Retired: December 3, 2024
- Predecessor: Diocese erected
- Successor: Elias Ayuban CMF
- Previous posts: Priest, Archdiocese of San Fernando (1972–1998); Bishop of Balanga (1998–2003); Treasurer, CBCP (2001–2011); Bishop of Cubao (2003–2024); Apostolic Administrator of Malolos (2018–2019)

Orders
- Ordination: December 8, 1972 by Emilio Cinense y Abera
- Consecration: June 18, 1998 by Jaime Sin

Personal details
- Born: October 17, 1948 (age 78) San Fernando, Pampanga, Philippines
- Residence: Bishop's Residence, Cubao, Quezon City
- Education: San Jose Seminary; Ateneo de Manila University
- Motto: Maior autem caritas (Latin for 'The greatest of these is charity')

Ordination history
History
Priestly ordination
- Ordained by: Emilio Cinense y Abera
Episcopal consecration
- Principal consecrator: Jaime Sin
- Co-consecrators: Paciano Aniceto; Celso Nogoy Guevarra
- Styles

Honesto "Nes" Flores Ongtioco (born October 17, 1948) is a Filipino bishop of the Catholic Church. He served as the second Bishop of Balanga from 1998 to 2003, first Bishop of Cubao from 2003 to 2024, and apostolic administrator of Malolos from 2018 to 2019.

== Early life and education ==
Honesto Flores Ongtioco was born on October 17, 1948, at San Fernando, Pampanga. He attended high school at Don Bosco Academy. He also attended the Loyola School of Theology in Ateneo de Manila University.

In 1987 he obtained a licentiate in Sacred Theology from the Pontifical University of Saint Thomas Aquinas.

== Ministry ==
=== Priesthood (1972–1998) ===
On December 8, 1972, Ongtioco was ordained to the priesthood by San Fernando bishop Emilio Cinense y Abera at the Cathedral of Our Lady of the Assumption in Pampanga.

After his ordination, Ongtioco was given several assignments within the Archdiocese of San Fernando. He served as spiritual director, professor, rector, and other positions in Mother of Good Counsel Minor Seminary, and University of the Assumption. He was also appointed as parochial vicar of the Holy Rosary Parish in Angeles City from 1974 to 1975 and at St. Peter and Paul Parish in Apalit from 1975 to 1977. In 1975, he was also the acting parish priest of St. Catherine of Alexandria Parish in Porac and acting director of St. Catherine Academy in Apalit.

On March 21, 1992, Ongtioco was invested as honorary prelate. Five years later, he was appointed as rector of the Pontificio Collegio Filippino in Rome, Italy.

=== Bishop of Balanga (1998–2003) ===
Ongtioco became Bishop of Balanga on June 18, 1998 and served until August 28, 2003. The installation ceremony was presided by the then-Apostolic Nuncio to the Philippines Gian Vincenzo Moreni, and Archbishops of San Fernando Paciano Aniceto and Manila Jaime Sin as consecrator.

Ongtioco served as the treasurer of the Catholic Bishops' Conference of the Philippines (CBCP) from 2001 to 2011.

=== Bishop of Cubao (2003–2024) ===
On June 28, 2003, he was named as the first Bishop of Cubao by Pope John Paul II and installed on August 28 of that year.

Due to the death of Bishop José F. Oliveros, the fourth Bishop of Malolos, on May 11, 2018, Pope Francis appointed him as the apostolic administrator or temporary bishop of the diocese on May 16, 2018. As per No. 244 of the Apostolorum Successores or Directory of Pastoral Ministry of Bishops, Ongtioco held “all the faculties and rights to exercise the office of a diocesan bishop.” He ceased being apostolic administrator of the diocese on August 21, 2019, upon the installation of Dennis Cabanada Villarojo as Oliveros' successor.

On July 19, 2019, the PNP–Criminal Investigation and Detection Group (CIDG) filed charges against Ongtioco, fellow bishops Socrates Villegas, Pablo Virgilio David, and Teodoro Bacani Jr., as well as members of the opposition for "sedition, cyber libel, libel, estafa, harboring a criminal, and obstruction of justice". The charges were eventually dropped in February 2020 due to lack of evidence.

On October 4, 2024, Pope Francis accepted his resignation after he reached the retirement age of 75 effective on December 3, 2024 where Elias Ayuban became his successor upon installation on a latter date.

== Coat of arms ==
Coat of arms of Honesto Ongtioco
Adopted August 28, 2003 Helm Bishop's galero The shield is surmounted by the bishop's galero or ecclesiastical hat of this rank with six tassels for each side in vert (green) that signifies the rank of a bishop. Escutcheon From 2003: Parted per fess: First: Golden (or), three hills surmounted by a Tau cross, Second: Azure (blue), four, five-petalled white flowers on a blue field; Impaled with a shield tierced per fess: Golden (or) crown and three white stars on a blue (azure) diagonal line on a white (argent) background. Motto Maior autem caritas "The greatest of these is charity" (from 1 Corinthians 13:13). Other elements Latin Cross; The shield is also surmounted by the Latin cross, symbolizing the bishop's dignity. Previous versions Bishop of Balanga (June 18, 1998–August 28, 2003)

Academic offices
Preceded by Jesse Mercado	Rector of Pontificio Collegio Filippino; 1997 – June 18, 1998	Succeeded by Romulo Vergara
Catholic Church titles
Preceded by Celso N. Guevarra	Bishop of Balanga; June 18, 1998 – August 28, 2003	Succeeded by Socrates B. Villegas
New diocese	Bishop of Cubao; August 28, 2003 – December 3, 2024	Succeeded by Elias L. Ayuban, Jr.
