= San Vicente Ferrer Church =

San Vicente Ferrer Church may refer to:

- San Vicente Ferrer Church (Calulut)
- San Vicente Ferrer Church (Dupax del Sur)
- San Vicente Ferrer Church (Leganes, Iloilo)
- San Vicente Ferrer Church (Sabtang)
