= Fiel Pareja =

Filipino Catholic priest and social media personality

- Born: 20 August 1990 (age 36); Philippines
- Citizenship: Filipino
- Occupations: Catholic priest; Social media content creator
- Known for: TikTok ministry: "Father TikTok"

Fiel Pareja (born 20 August 1990), known online as Fr. Fiel Pareja or "Father TikTok", is a Filipino Roman Catholic priest of the Archdiocese of San Fernando in Pampanga. He has become known for being the first and one of the most visible Catholic priests in TikTok, where he posts religious reflections, prayer times, and bible read-throughs.

== Priesthood ==
Pareja was ordained a priest on 14 February 2020 at the Archdiocese of San Fernando, Pampanga. After his ordination, the COVID-19 restrictions of the Philippines led to the cancellation of regular Sunday Masses and pastoral work. He has since served as parish priest of, among other churches, Our Lady of the Holy Rosary Parish in Magalang, Pampanga.

== Social media ministry ==
Before the COVID-19 pandemic, Pareja began to record short video clips on TikTok. His videos feature morning devotions, Bible verse observations, prayer and sometimes features his involvement on TikTok trend challenges, sometimes wearing a clerical attire. He records videos in two languages, English and Tagalog.

His social media has gained millions of fans. With a later estimate that he had about 3.6 million followers and upward of 150 million likes. He also maintains a presence on Facebook and even leads a daily devotional.

In 2021 he received TikTok awards in the Rising Star and Top Educational Creator categories for his ministry-related videos.

Pareja has described his social media activity as a secondary part of his priestly work, with on-the-ground pastoral duties remaining the priority.
