= Mother of Good Counsel Seminary =

Roman Catholic seminary in Pampanga, Philippines

Coordinates: 15°02′05″N 120°41′49″E

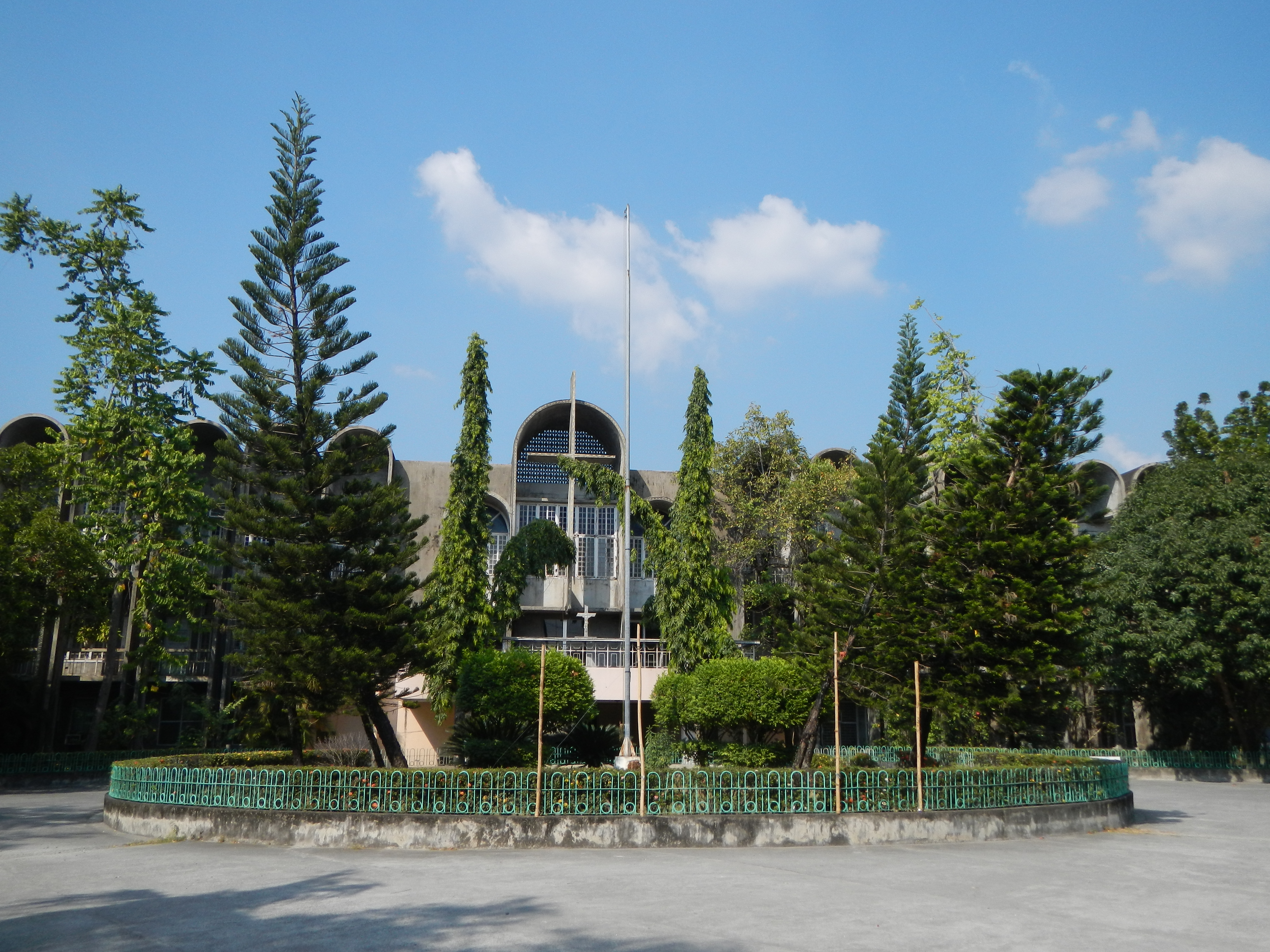
- Latin: Seminarium Matris Boni Consilii
- Motto: Acquiesce Consiliis Meis
- Type: Seminary
- Established: July 4, 1950
- Founder: +Most. Rev. Cesar Maria Guerrero
- Affiliations: Roman Catholic Archdiocese of San Fernando
- Rector: Very Rev. Fr. Kenneth Alde
- Procurator: Rev. Fr. June N. Siccion
- Marian Patroness: Our Lady of Good Counsel

The Mother of Good Counsel Seminary is the seminary of the Archdiocese of San Fernando, in the Pampanga province of the Philippines.

== History ==
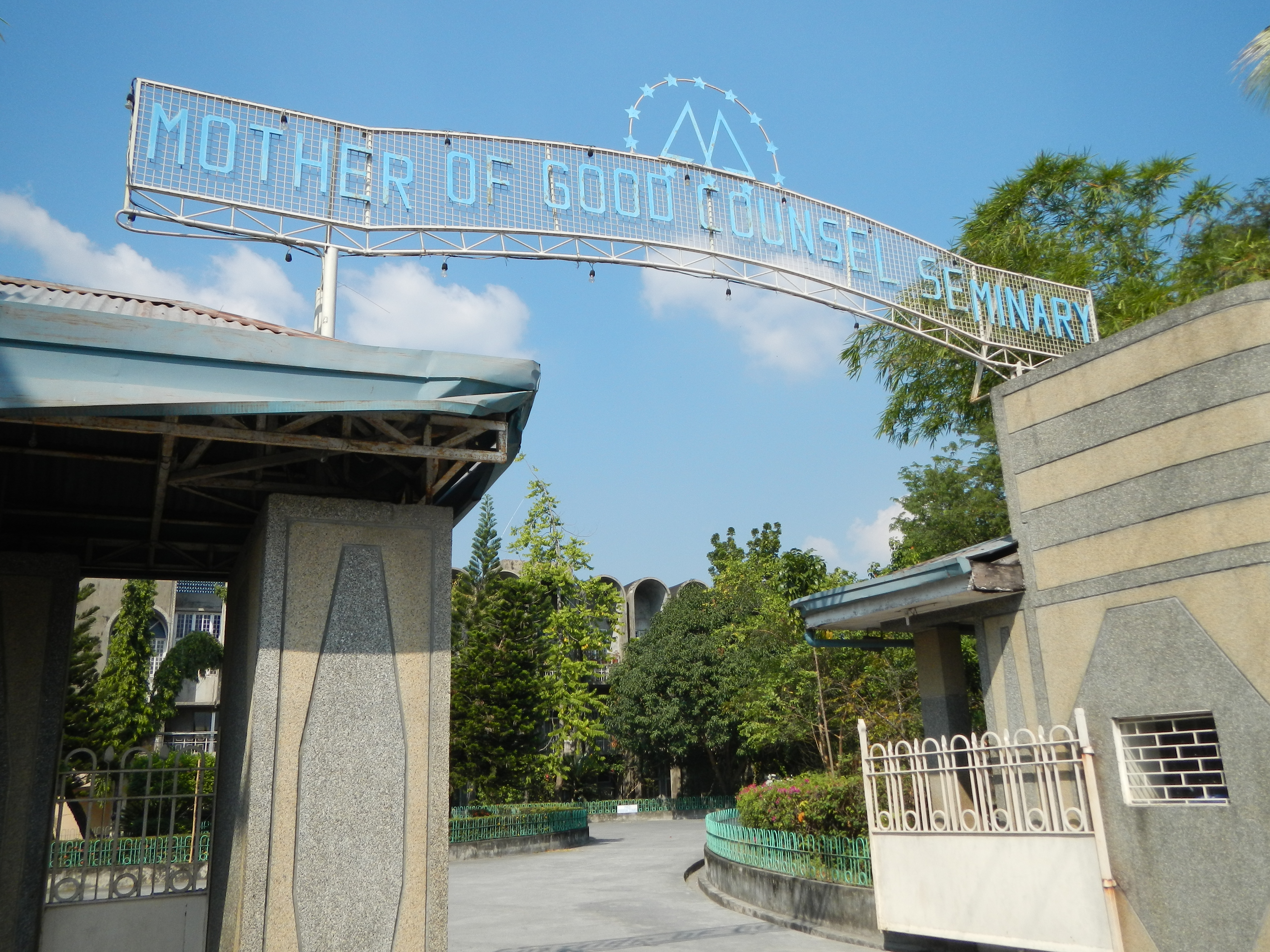
Entrance arch

Bishop Cesar Maria Guerrero established the Mater Boni Consilii (now Mother of Good Counsel) Seminary in 1950. It was originally in Guagua (1950-1952), then Apalit (1953-1963), before moving to its present site in San Fernando, Pampanga (1963-Present).
