= San Luis Gonzaga Parish Church =

Roman Catholic church in Pampanga, Philippines

San Luis Church
- San Luis Gonzaga Parish Church
- Saint Aloysius Gonzaga Parish Church
- Parokya nang San Luis Gonzaga (Kapampangan); Iglesia Parroquial de San Luis Gonzaga (Spanish)
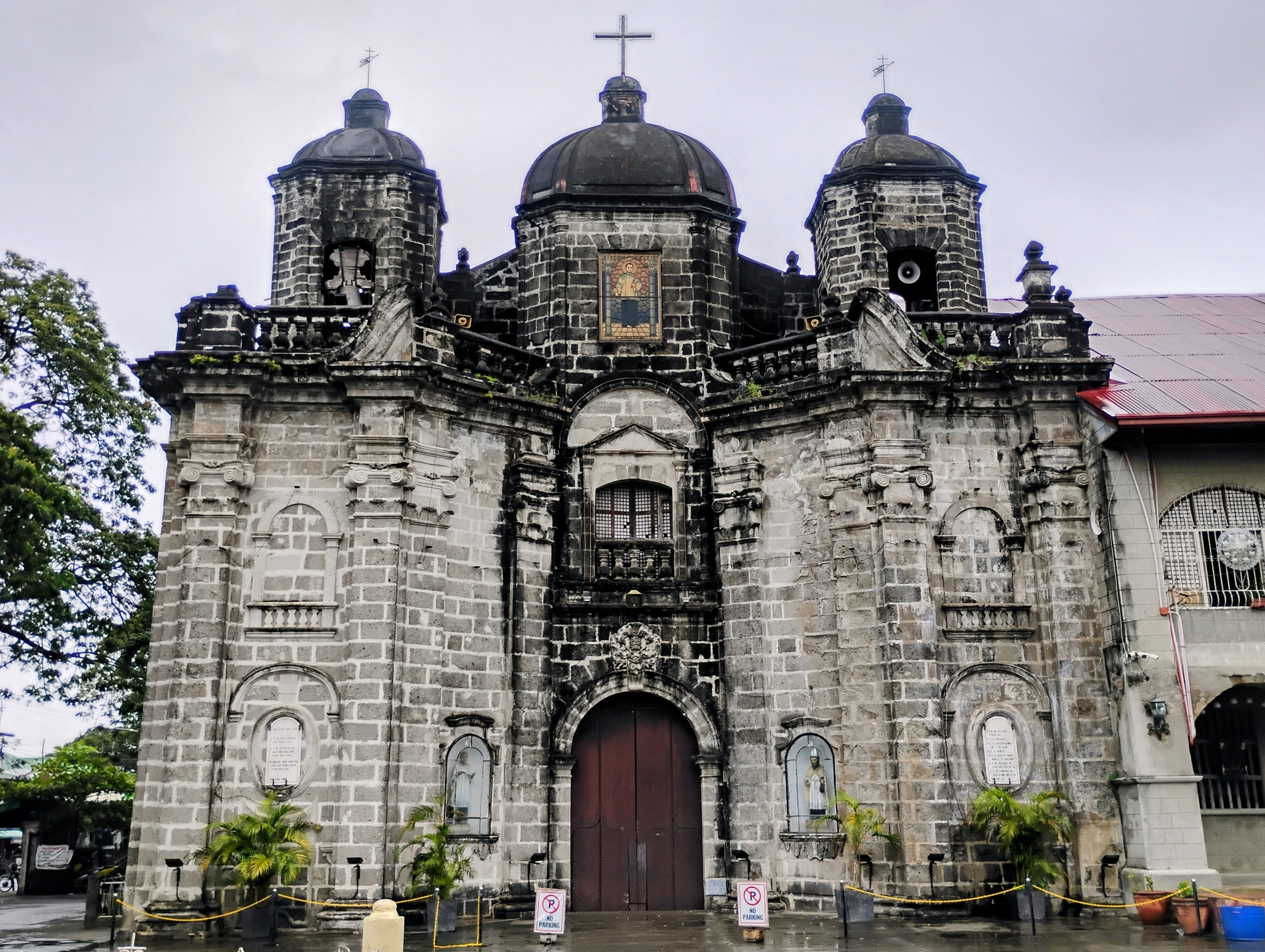
- Church façade in 2025

- Location in Luzon Location in the Philippines
- 15°02′21″N 120°47′25″E
- Location: Brgy. Sta Cruz Poblacion, San Luis, Pampanga
- Country: Philippines
- Denomination: Roman Catholic

History
- Status: Parish church
- Founded: 1734
- Founder: Fr. Ambrosio de San Agustin O.S.A.
- Dedication: Saint Aloysius Gonzaga

Architecture
- Functional status: Active
- Architectural type: Church building
- Style: Baroque; Renaissance; Partido Baroque
- Completed: 1883

Specifications
- Length: 56 metres (184 ft)
- Width: 13 metres (43 ft)
- Height: 11 metres (36 ft)
- Materials: Stone, mortar, sand, brick, wood

Administration
- Province: Pampanga
- Archdiocese: San Fernando

Clergy
- Archbishop: Florentino Lavarias
- Priest: Rev. Fr. Robert Feliciano

San Luis Gonzaga Parish Church, commonly known as San Luis Church, is a 19th-century Baroque Roman Catholic church located at Brgy. Sta. Cruz Poblacion, San Luis, Pampanga, Philippines. The parish church, dedicated to Saint Aloysius Gonzaga, is under the Archdiocese of San Fernando.

== History ==
=== Town history ===
San Luis was formerly referred to as San Nicolas de Cabagsac after its former vicar, Father Nicolas de Orduño. The meaning of cabagsa is a "place where plenty of fruit bats are caught". The Church was founded by Augustinian missionaries in 1742. Father Ambrosio de San Agustin was assigned as its first priest on April 25, 1744.

=== Church history ===
Records do not tell of the exact date of the construction of the present-day church although it was stated that Father Isidro Bernardo restored the said church structure in 1883. Father Francisco Diaz, then, enlarged the convent in 1877.

== Architecture ==
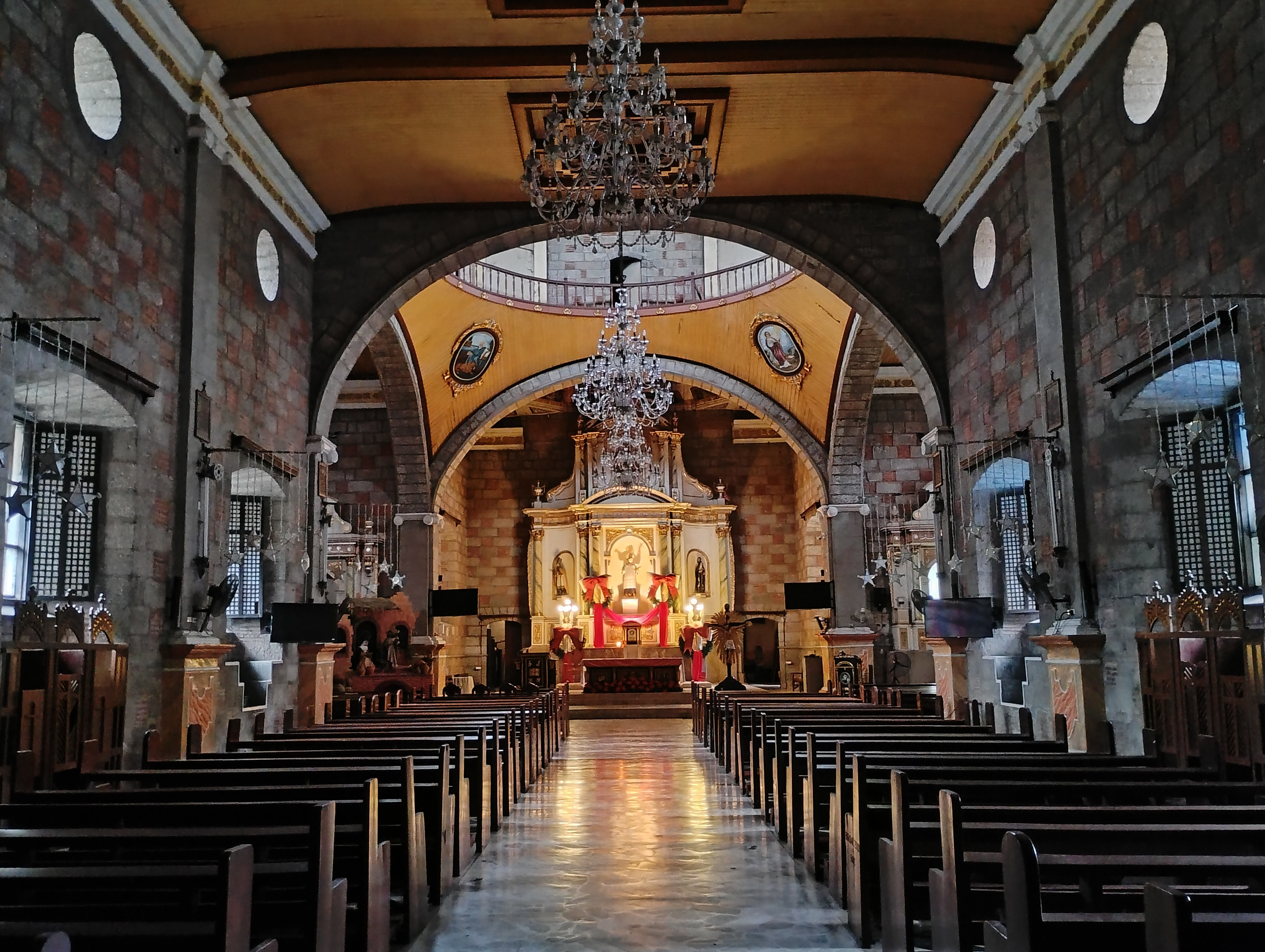
Church interior in 2025

The church facade is predominantly Baroque in style with the roughness and heaviness of its looks although some hints of Renaissance style can be found on the details of its twin belfries. The recessed main portal showcases a relief of the papal symbol and is flanked by two heavily-ornamented saints' niches. Stone balusters decorate the single window on the facade, the blind windows flanking it and the base of the pediment. Dominating the facade are columns capped with Ionic capitals and scroll-like volutes on the pediment.

== Gallery ==
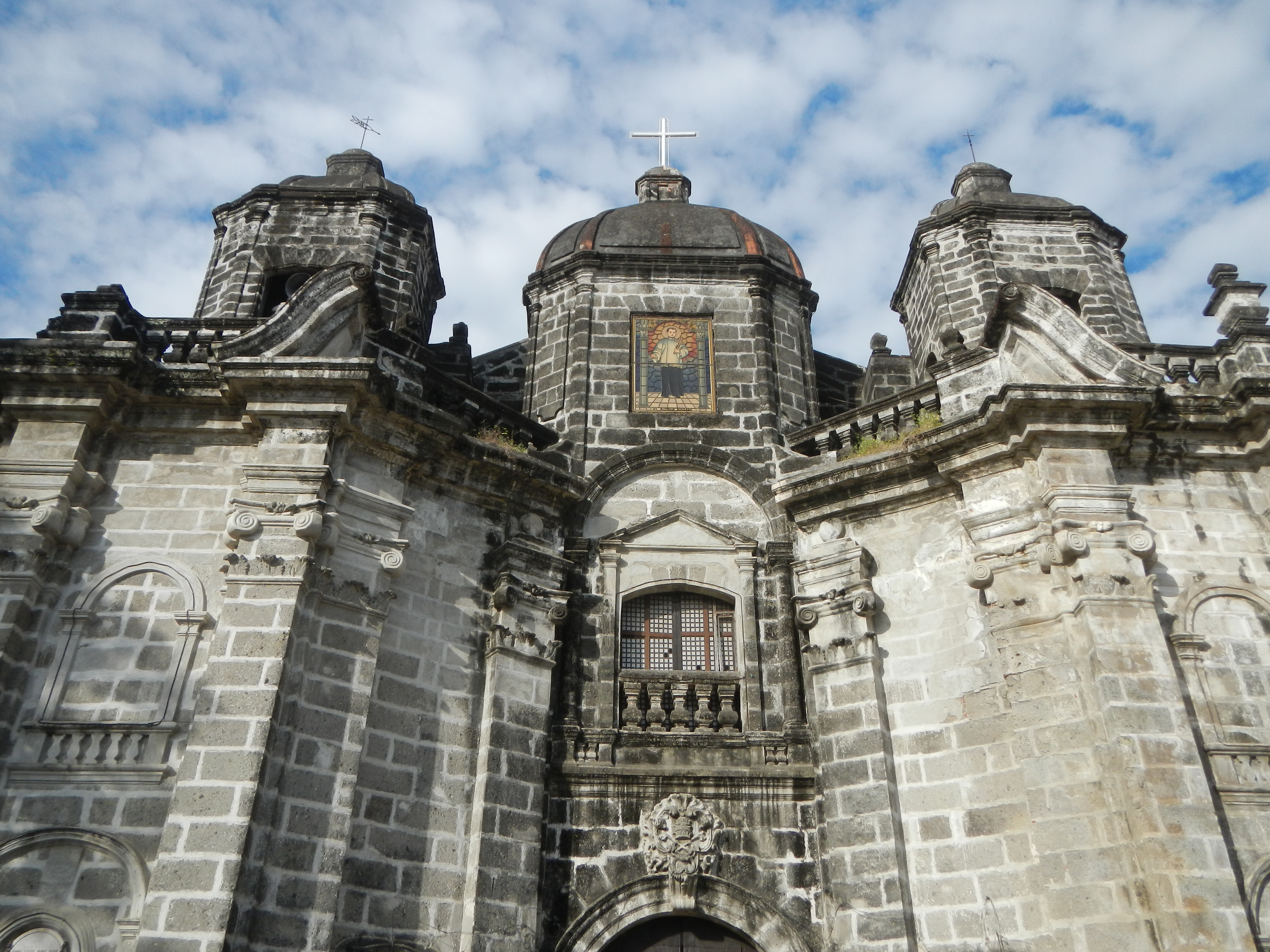
Detail of the facade

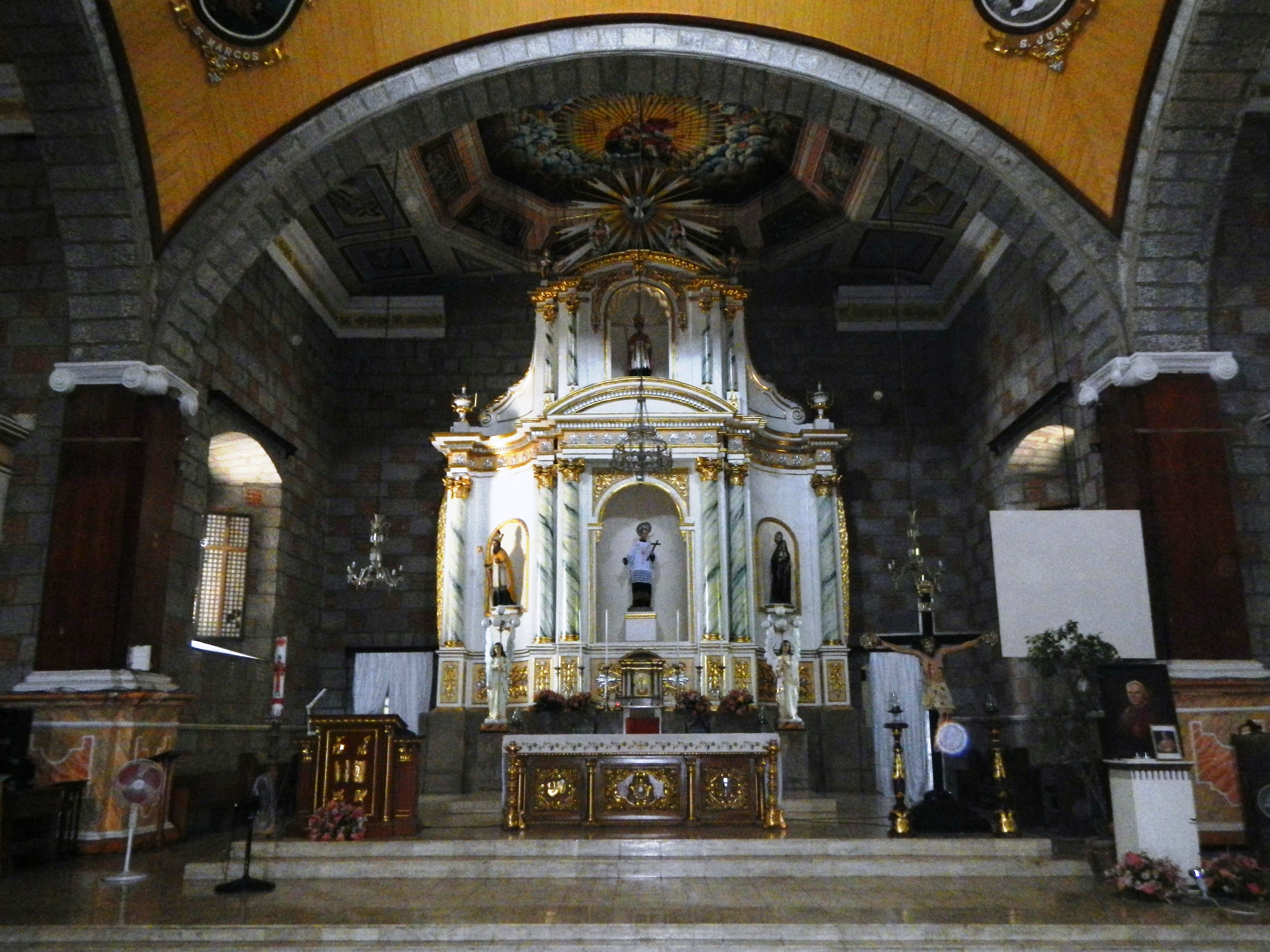
Church altar and reredos

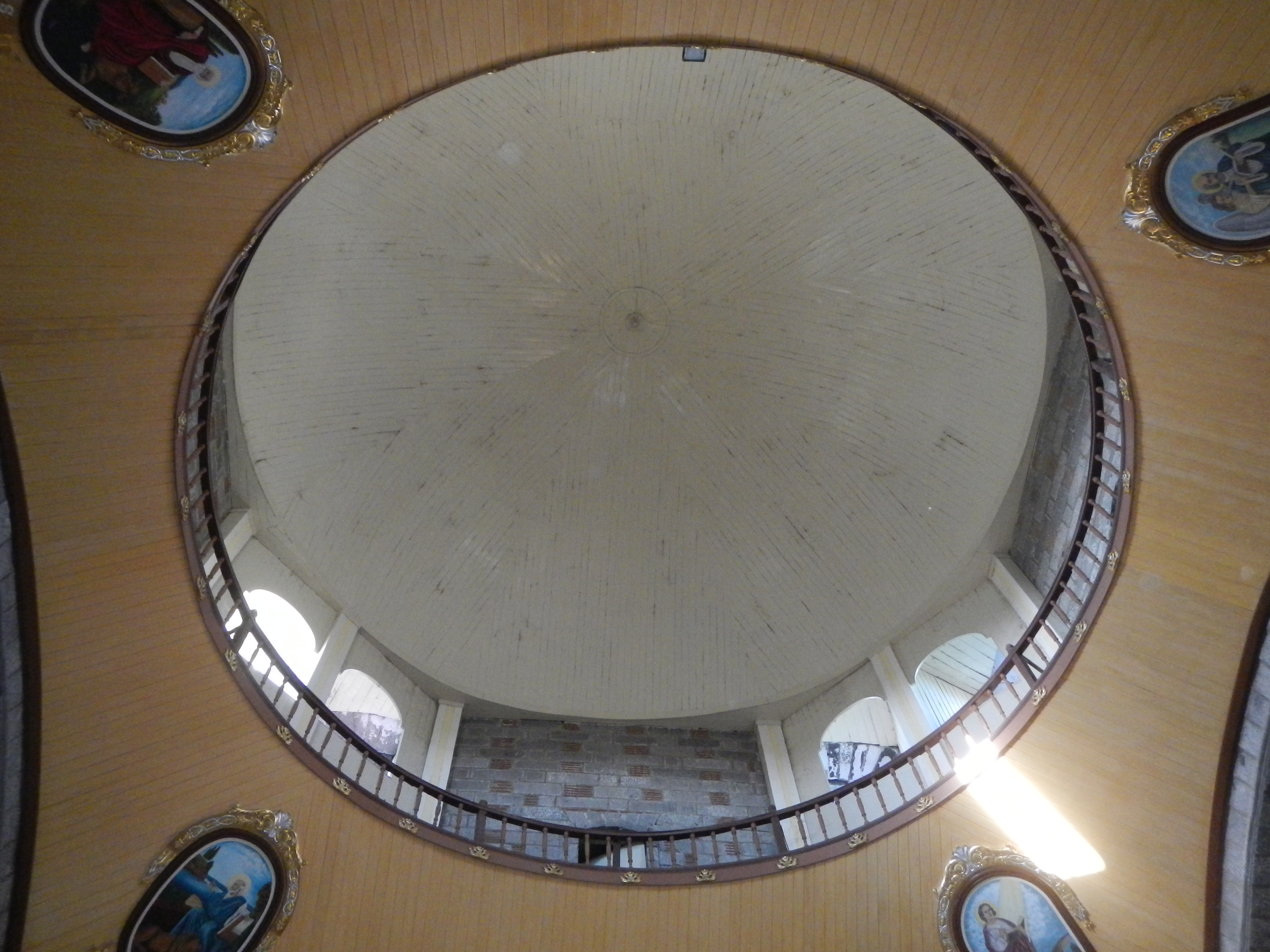
Dome interior

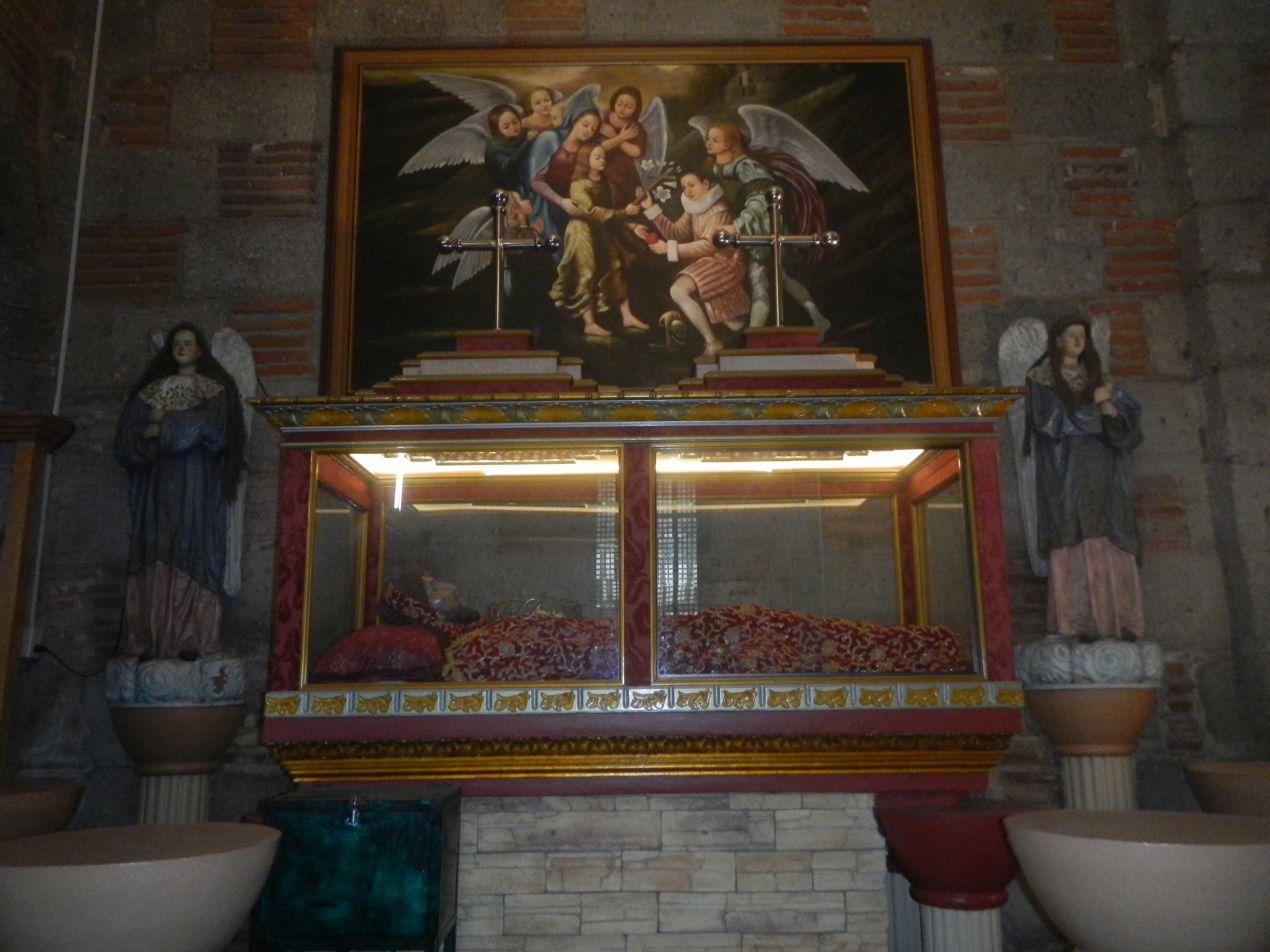
Santo Entierro

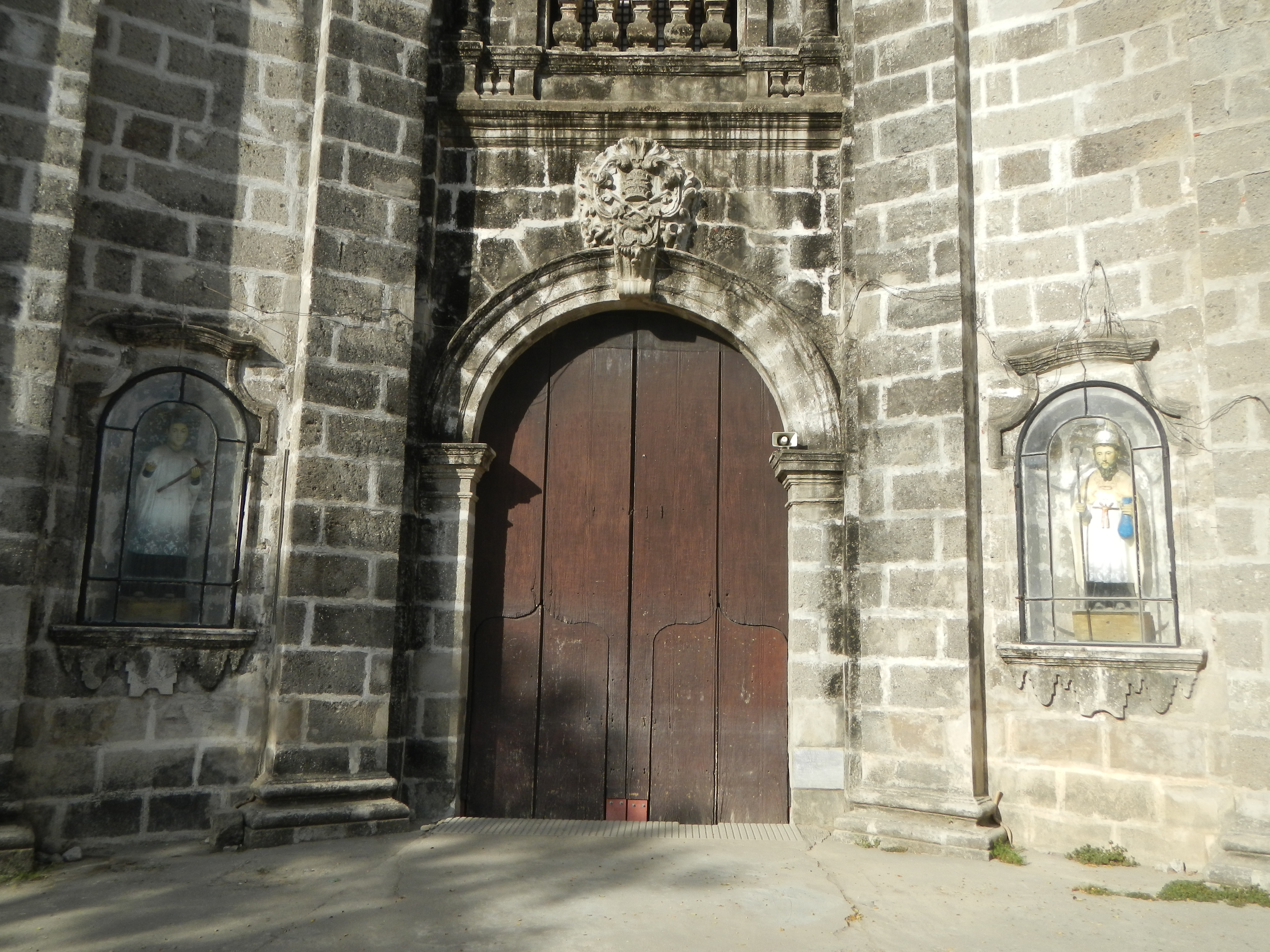
Church main portal
