= Santa Catalina Parish Church (Arayat) =

Roman Catholic church in Pampanga, Philippines

Arayat Church
- Saint Catherine of Alexandria Parish Church
- Santa Catalina de Alexandria Parish; Parroquia de Santa Catalina de Alejandria (Spanish)
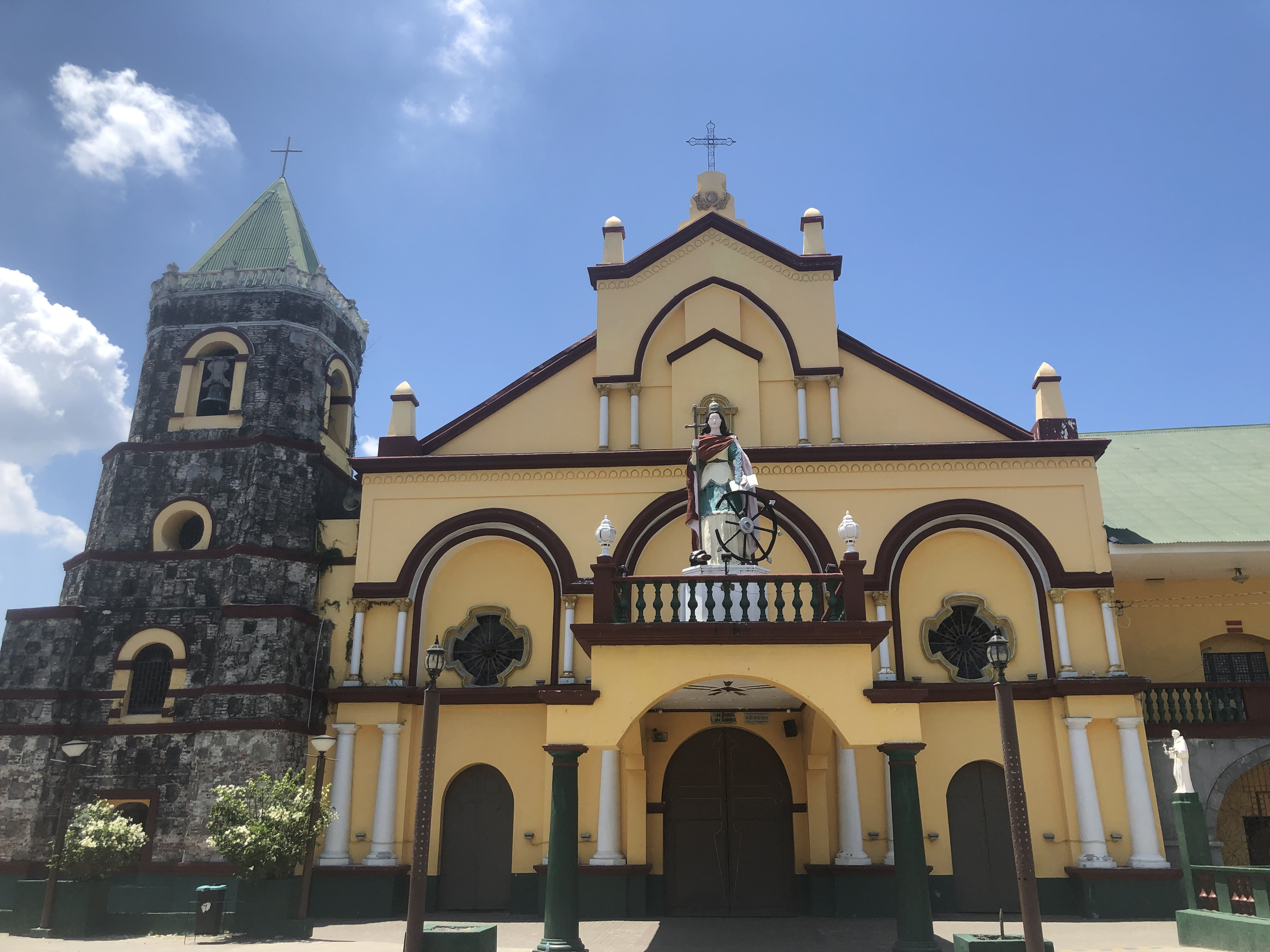
- Church facade in 2026

- Location in Luzon Location in the Philippines
- 15°09′05″N 120°46′21″E
- Location: Arayat, Pampanga
- Country: Philippines
- Denomination: Roman Catholic

History
- Status: Parish church
- Dedication: Saint Catherine of Alexandria

Architecture
- Functional status: Active
- Architectural type: Church building

Administration
- Archdiocese: Roman Catholic Archdiocese of San Fernando

Clergy
- Priest: Rev. Fr. Adrian P. Paule

Santa Catalina de Alexandria Parish Church, also known as Saint Catherine of Alexandria Parish Church or Arayat Church, is Renaissance-style Roman Catholic church in Arayat, Pampanga, Philippines. Since its initial construction during the late 1700s, it has been subjected to major alterations such as addition of decorative ornaments and reliefs and re-painting works.

== History ==
On August 29, 1590, Bishop Domingo Salazar approved the request of Augustinians to establish its first mission at the town of Arayat. In 1600, Fray Contreras established the parish church of Arayat. The church was dedicated to Santa Catalina de Alejandria, a 4th-century martyr. She was considered as one of the most important saints of the Medieval Period. Her feast day is celebrated every November 25.

== Architectural history ==
Santa Catalina Church was built in 1753, based on the canonical books stating that baptismal activities have been conducted by Fray Villalobos since 1758. At present, it belongs to the parish of the Vicariate of Mary, Help of Christians, in the Archdiocese of San Fernando.

- Fr. Jose Torres – made restorations on the church in 1858.
- Fr. Juan Tarrero – continued the restoration work initiated by Fr. Jose Torres. However, he was not able to finish it due to the Philippine Revolution.
- Fr. Urbano Bedoya – In 1892, he finished the restoration work began by his predecessors.

== Architectural features ==
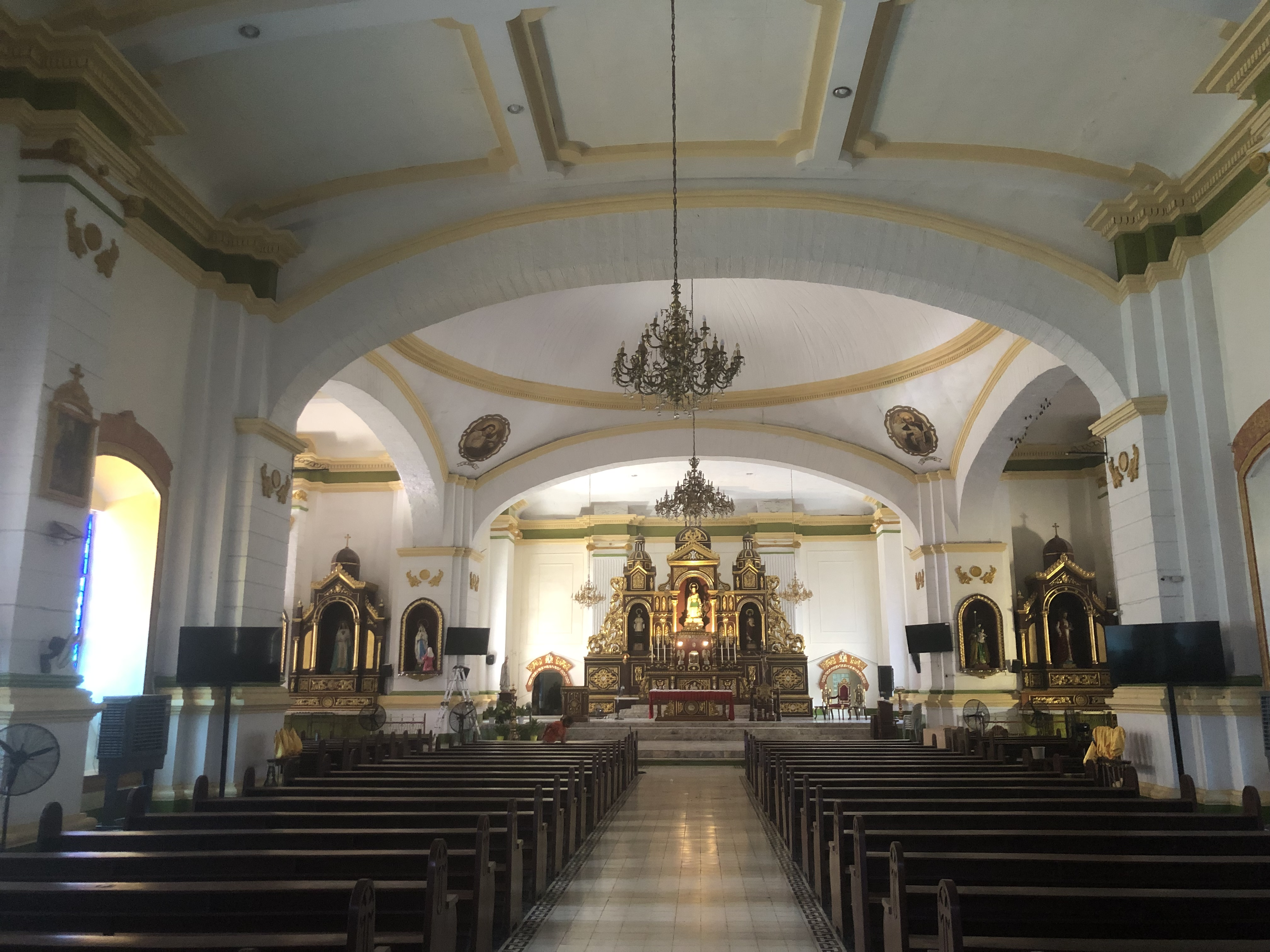
Church interior in 2026

Santa Catalina Church measures 70 metres (230 ft) long and 16 metres (52 ft) wide. It is 12 metres (39 ft) in height.

The Renaissance-style facade is characterized with its frontal arcade on the second level and Celtic-like cross windows on the sides. Another feature is the pediment with its axial feature of a blind pointed archway framing a small semicircular arched window placed underneath a superimposed gabled plane. An image of Santa Catalina is located at the portico of the church while a separate antique image is located at the main altar. The bell tower at the left has chamfered corners and was covered by a domical roof. At present, it has been replaced by intersecting gable roofs.

A marble engraving is present at the topmost part of the arched main doorway. It states:

"JUAN MEDINA LUISA GABRIEL: DONANTES DE LOS VIENTE MIL PESOS PARA LA REPARACION DE ESTA IGLESIA DE ARAYAT. 1923."
