= Saint Peter the Apostle Parish Church (Apalit) =

Roman Catholic church in Pampanga, Philippines

Apalit Church
- Saint Peter the Apostle Parish Church
- San Pedro Apostol Parish Church
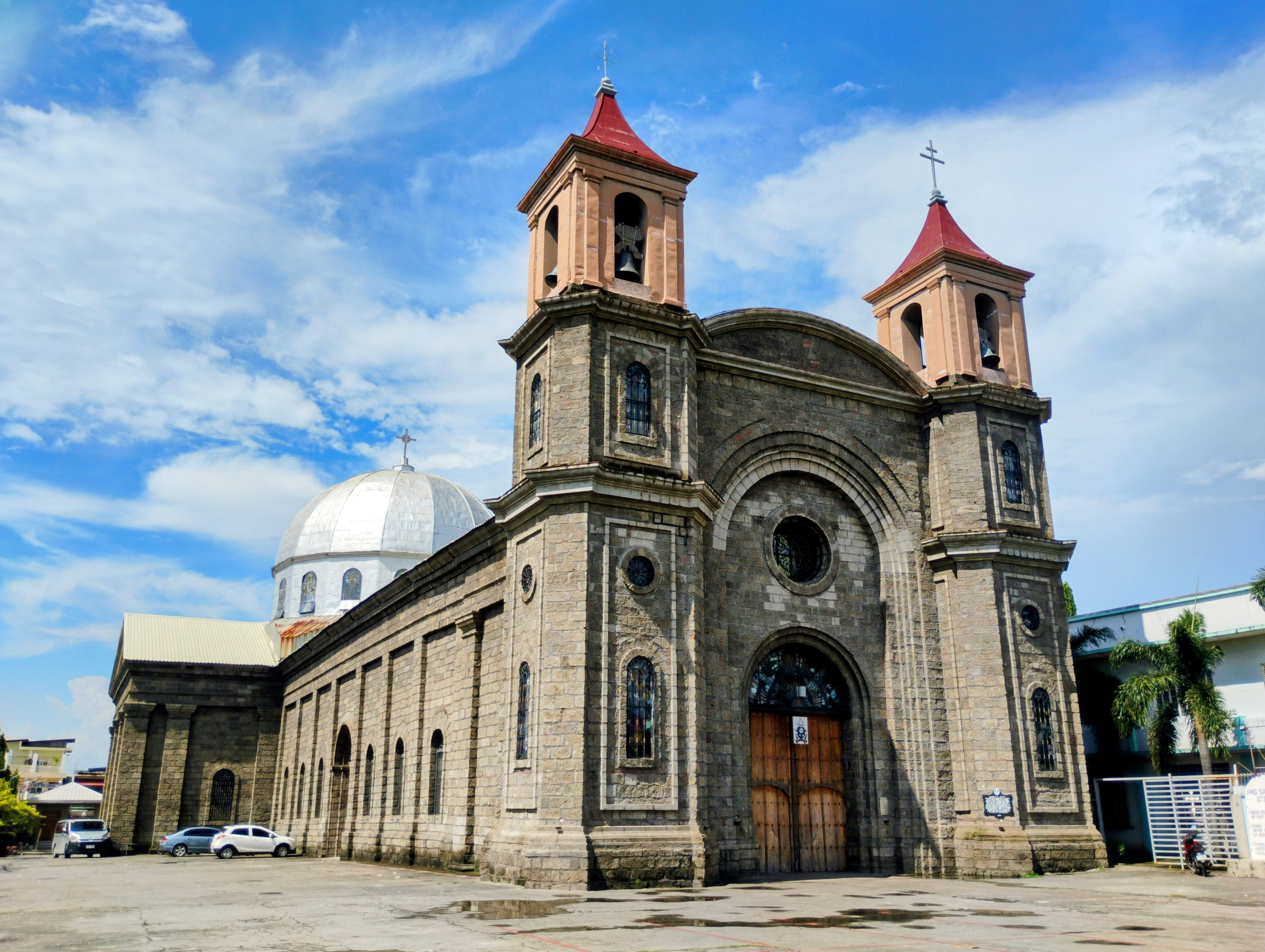
- Church facade in 2025

- Location in Luzon Location in the Philippines
- 14°57′13″N 120°46′21″E
- Location: Apalit, Pampanga
- Country: Philippines
- Denomination: Roman Catholic

History
- Status: Parish church

Architecture
- Functional status: Active
- Architectural type: Church building
- Style: Renaissance Revival

Administration
- Archdiocese: San Fernando

Clergy
- Archbishop: Florentino Lavarias
- Priest: Rev. Fr. Marcelino B. Mandap

Saint Peter the Apostle Parish Church, commonly known as the Apalit Church, is a Neo-Renaissance-style Roman Catholic church located in Apalit, in the province of Pampanga, Philippines. The additional construction of the two towers beside the church served as reinforcements to improve the structural integrity of the church. The church also houses bells manufactured by Fundicion de Hilario Sunico Jaboneros.

== History ==
In 1597, the Parish of Apalit was separated from the Parish of Calumpit. Fr. Pedro de Vergara was installed as the first curé of Apalit.

On June 28, 1844, the traditional fluvial procession called Libad honouring Saint Peter the Apostle was instituted by Capitán del Pueblo Don Pedro Armayan Espíritu.

On July 22, 2017, the holy relic of St. Peter was enthroned in the parish. The holy relic is a fragment of the bones of the remains of St. Peter, and Apalit Church is the only church that has the relic of St. Peter other than St. Peter's Basilica in Rome.

== Architectural history ==
=== Fr. Juan Cabello ===
- Fr. Cabello began the construction of the church and convento from 1641 until 1645.

=== Fr. Simón de Alarcia ===
- From 1854 to 1860, Fr. de Alarcia tried to build a three-nave church using stone and brick materials. However, records do not indicate if he was able to finish the church.
- 1863: the church was destroyed in an earthquake that damaged buildings in Manila.

=== Fr. Antonio Redondo ===
- Following the initial plans of Don Ramón Hermosa, an assistant officer to the Minister of Public Works, Fr. Redondo laid the foundations of the new church in January 1876.
- The construction of the church was completed in 1883. It was reconsecrated during the town fiesta of that year.

=== Fr. Toribio Fanjul ===
- The two belltowers were completed in 1896.

=== Msgr. Rústico C. Cuevas ===
- 1989: Major renovations were conducted at the church.

== Architectural features ==
Apalit Church measures 59 metres (194 ft) long and 14 metres (46 ft) wide. The facade resembles the Neo-Renaissance style with its plain, low segmental pediment and the symmetrical alignment of two flanking towers. The semi-circular main door with a circular window above is framed by receding semicircular arches in relief.

The ceiling art paintings, also known as trompe l'oeil, were done by a native of Apalit, Marcilino "Siling" Serrano, under the supervision of Caesare Alberoni, an Italian free-lance painter. One notable set of ceiling art paintings is located in the interior of the cupola of the church, giving a rendition of the Apocalypse.

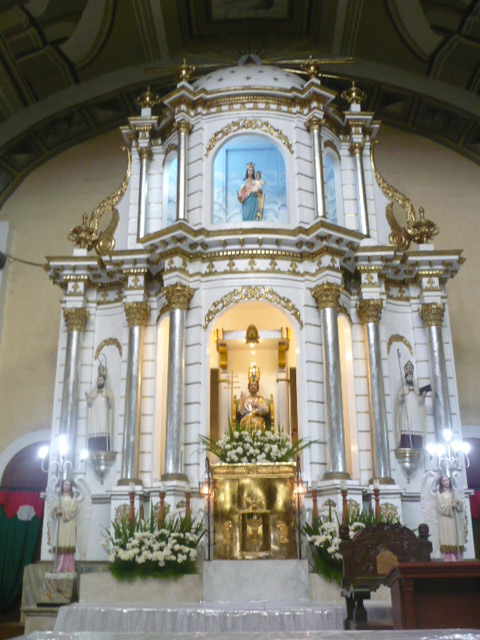
The main altar

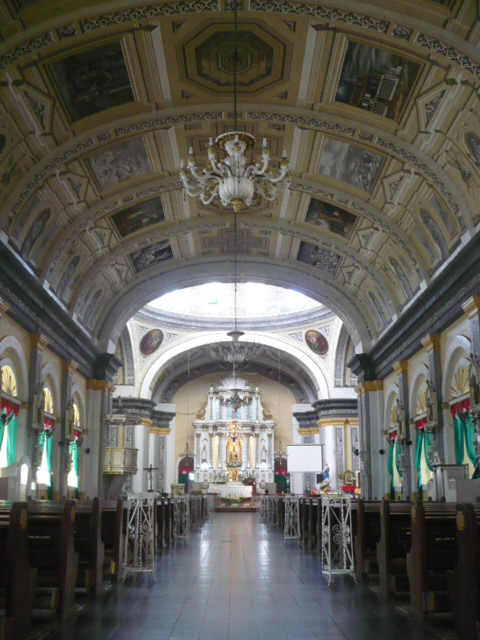
Aisle

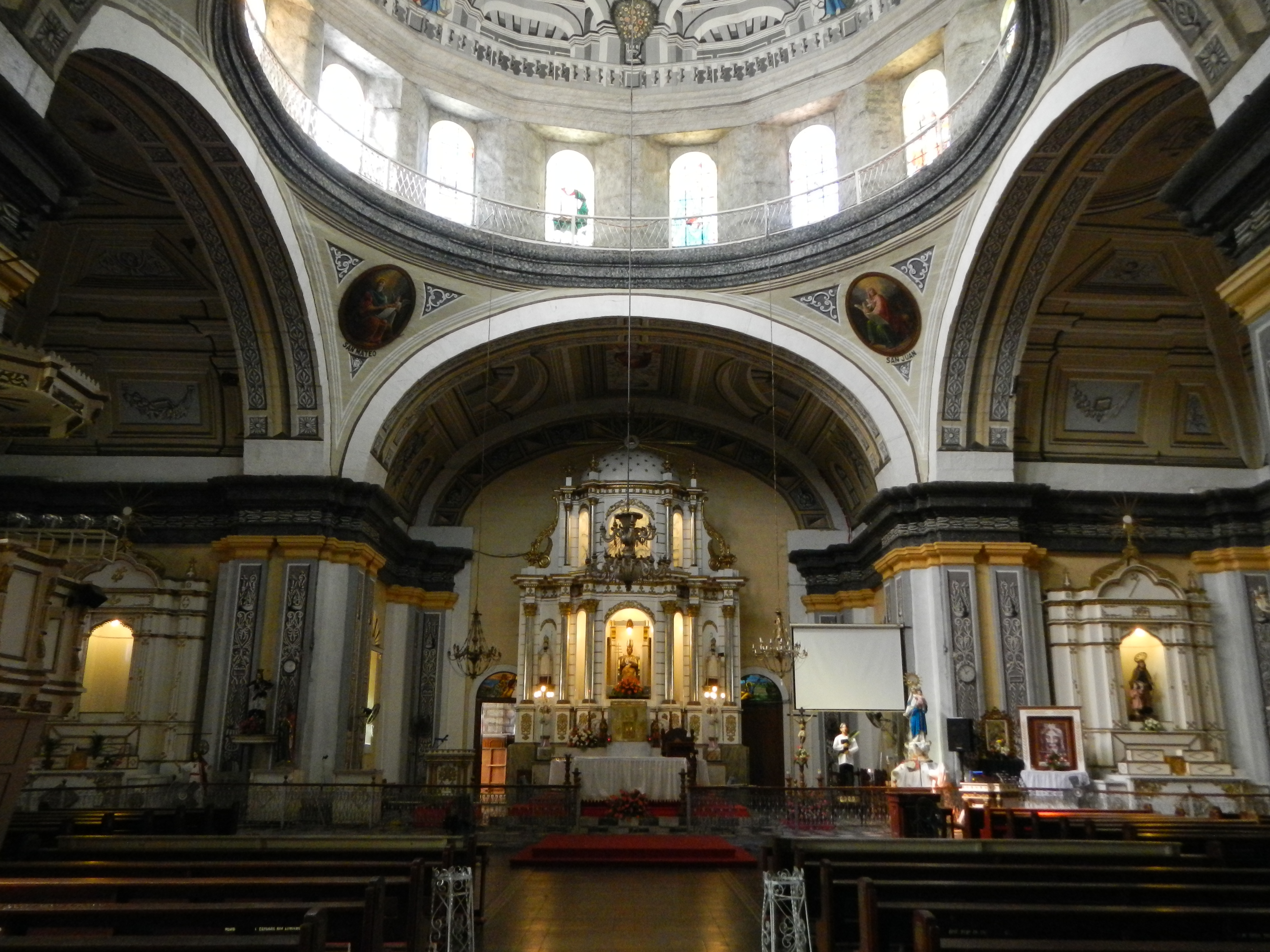
From the aisle, a nearer view of the main altar

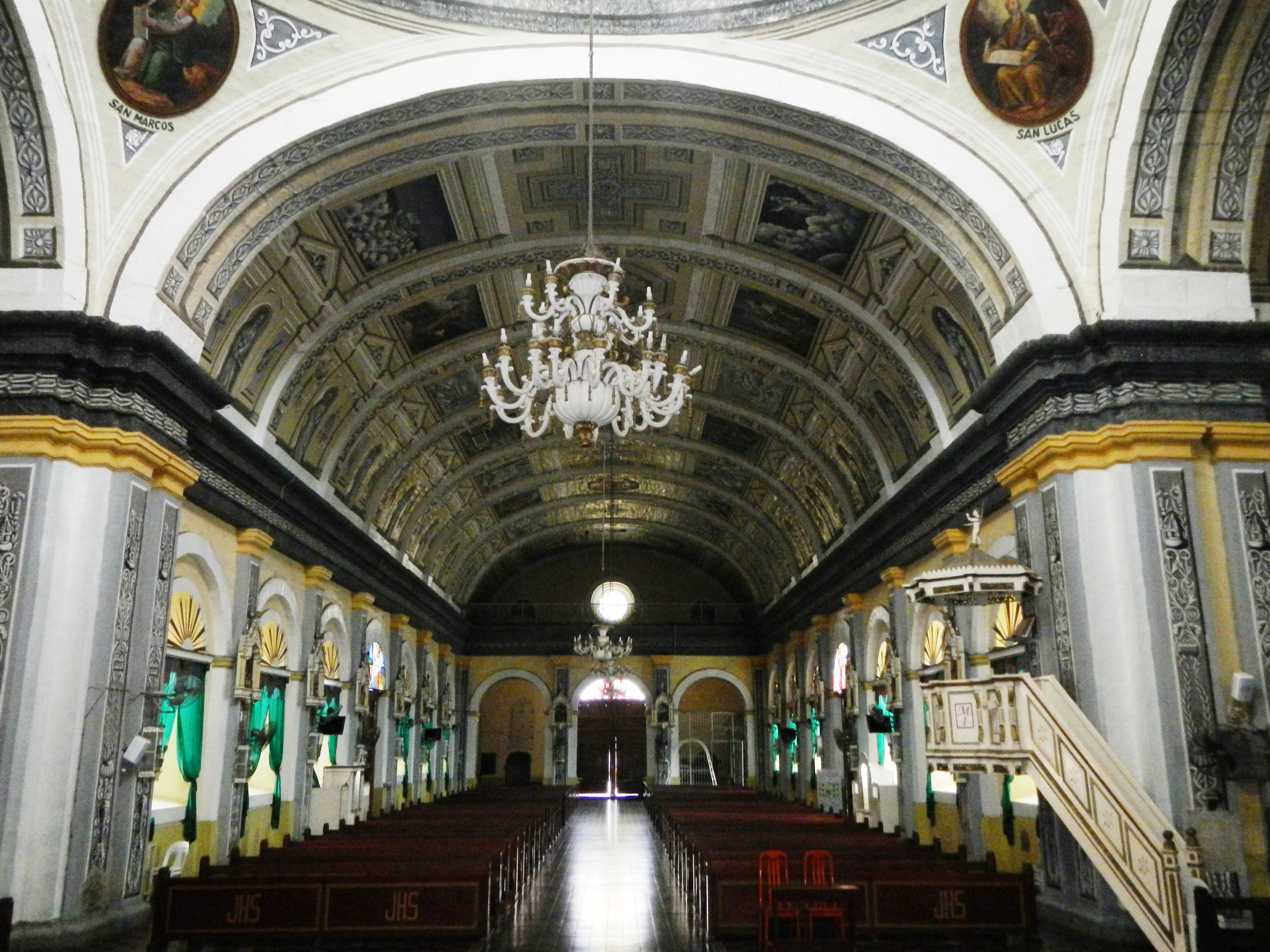
View from the main altar to the main portal

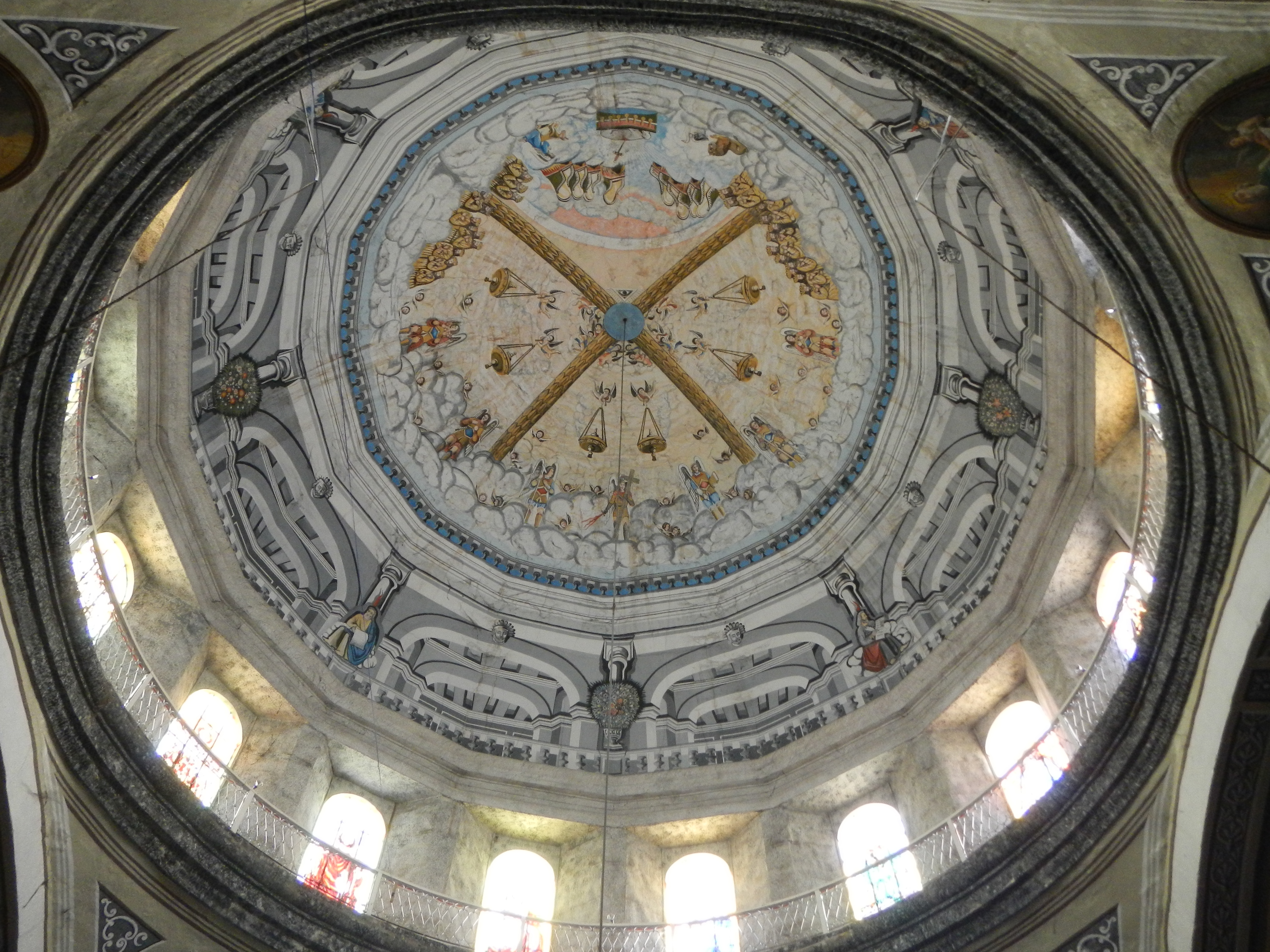
Dome interior

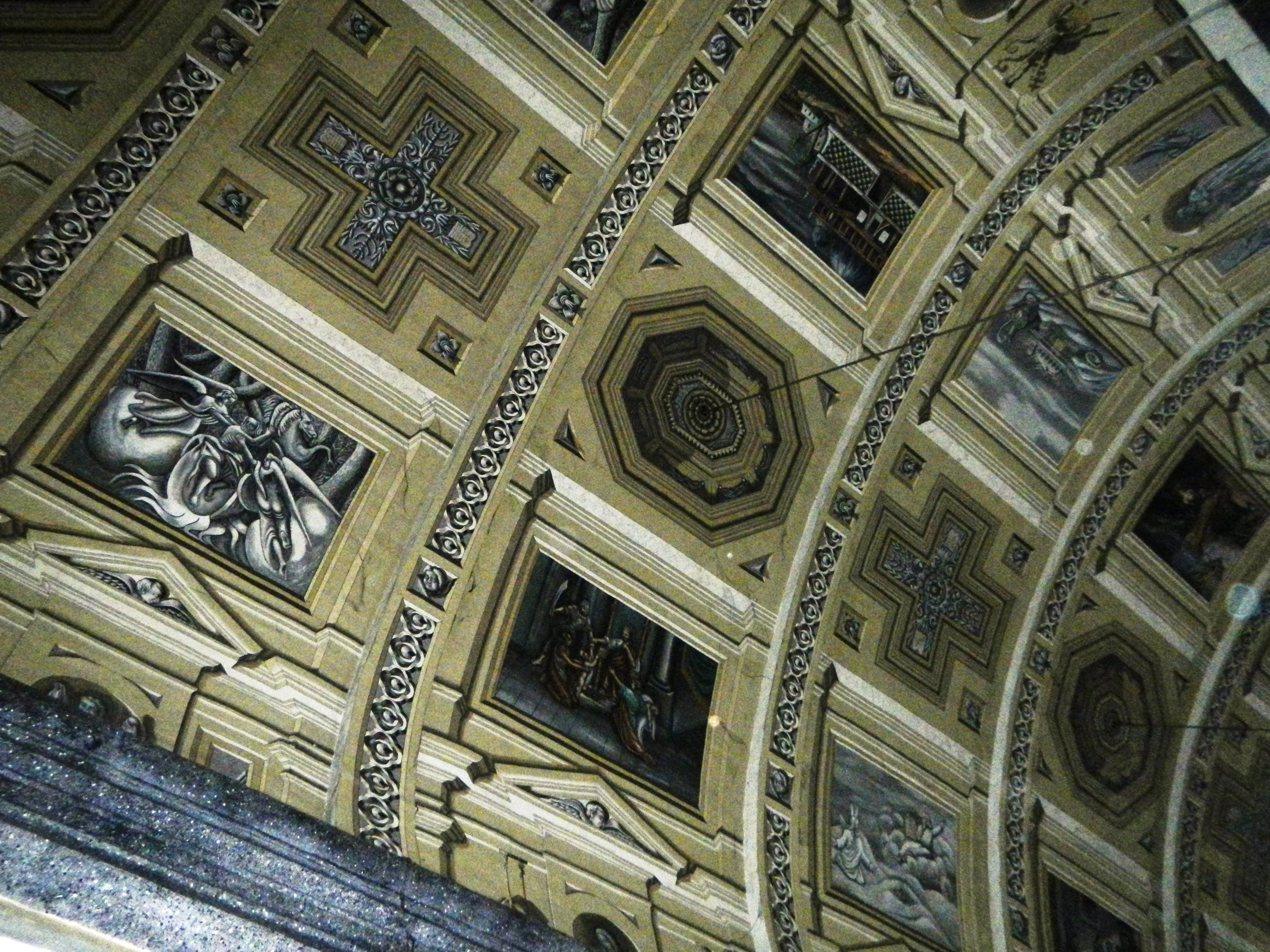
Church ceiling detail

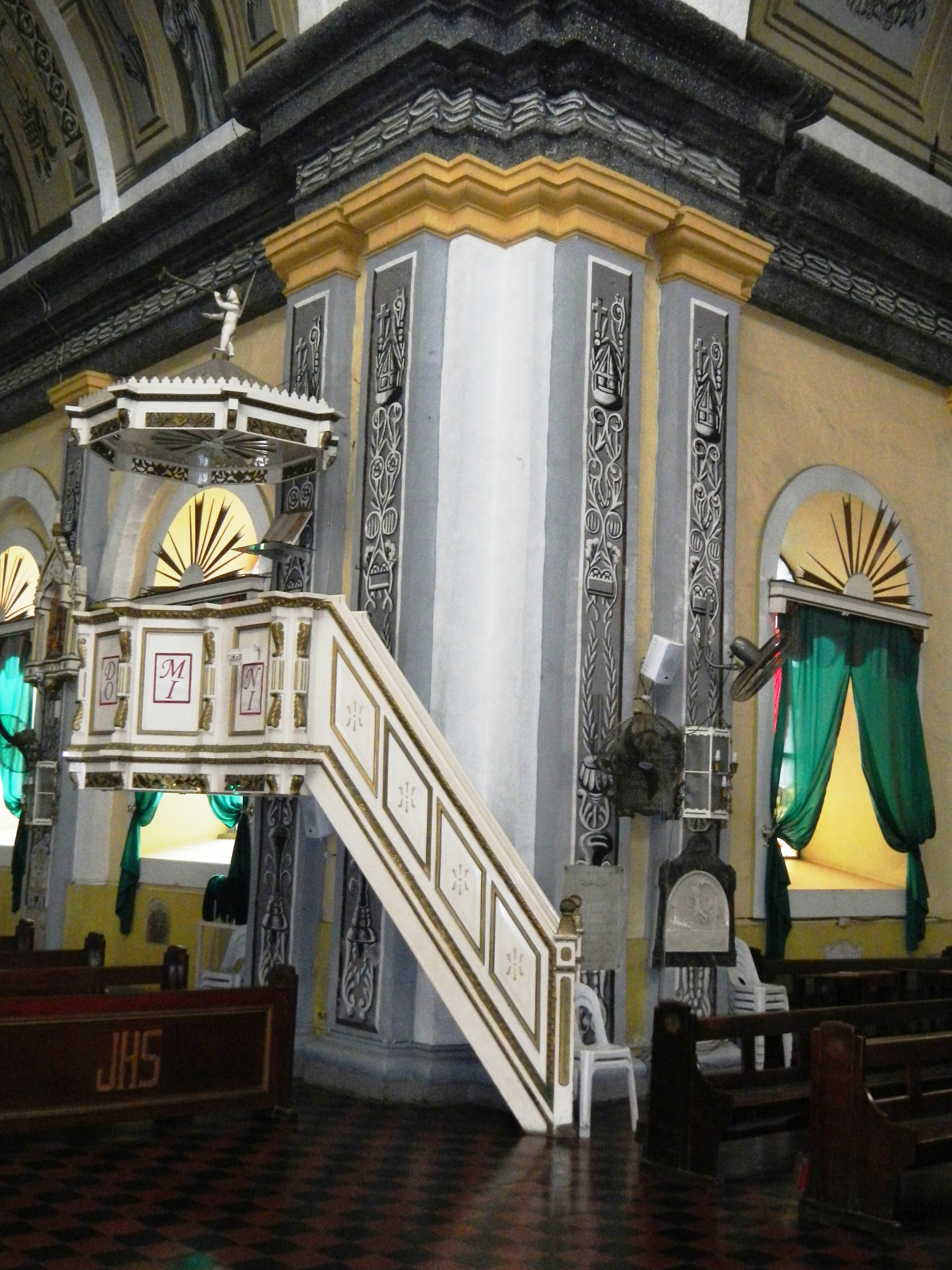
The pulpit

=== Bells ===
There are six bells in Apalit Church, five of which came from Fundicion de Hilario Sunico Jaboneros.

Below is the list of the bells at the church with their corresponding inscriptions:

Left northeastern tower	Weight (in lb.)	Inscription
Smallest bell	1/2 lb.	AÑO 1895-5 @ (ARROBAS)
Front, cracked	3 lbs.	SAGRADO CORAZON DE MARIA-SIENDO CURA PARROCO EL M.R.P. FR. TORIBIO FANJUL AÑO 1896 31
Second largest bell center stationary	8 lb.	S. PEDRO Y S. PABLO-FVNDIOSE ESTA CAMPANA EL AÑO DE 1821 SIENDO CVRA DE APALIT EL R.P.DIF.r F. JOSEPH POMETA AL TRIDECIMO AÑO DE CURA DE DICHO PUEBLO-FECIT BENITVS a REGIBUS-44
Right southeastern tower	Weight (in lb.)	Inscription
Second smallest bell, clapperless	-	SAN PEDRO DONACION DE D.a SABINA SIOCO-SIENDO CURA PARROCO EL REV. P. ANDRES BITUIN-APALIT, PAMPANGA. AÑO 1931-61 kilos
Big, clapperless bell (made outside of wrought metal bearing)	6 lbs.	* hardly-legible inscription
Front, biggest bell, chipped	10 lbs.	SAGRADO CORAZON DE JESUS-SIENDO CURA PARROCO EL M.R.P.F. TORIBIO FANJUL AÑO 1896-44

=== Historical marker ===
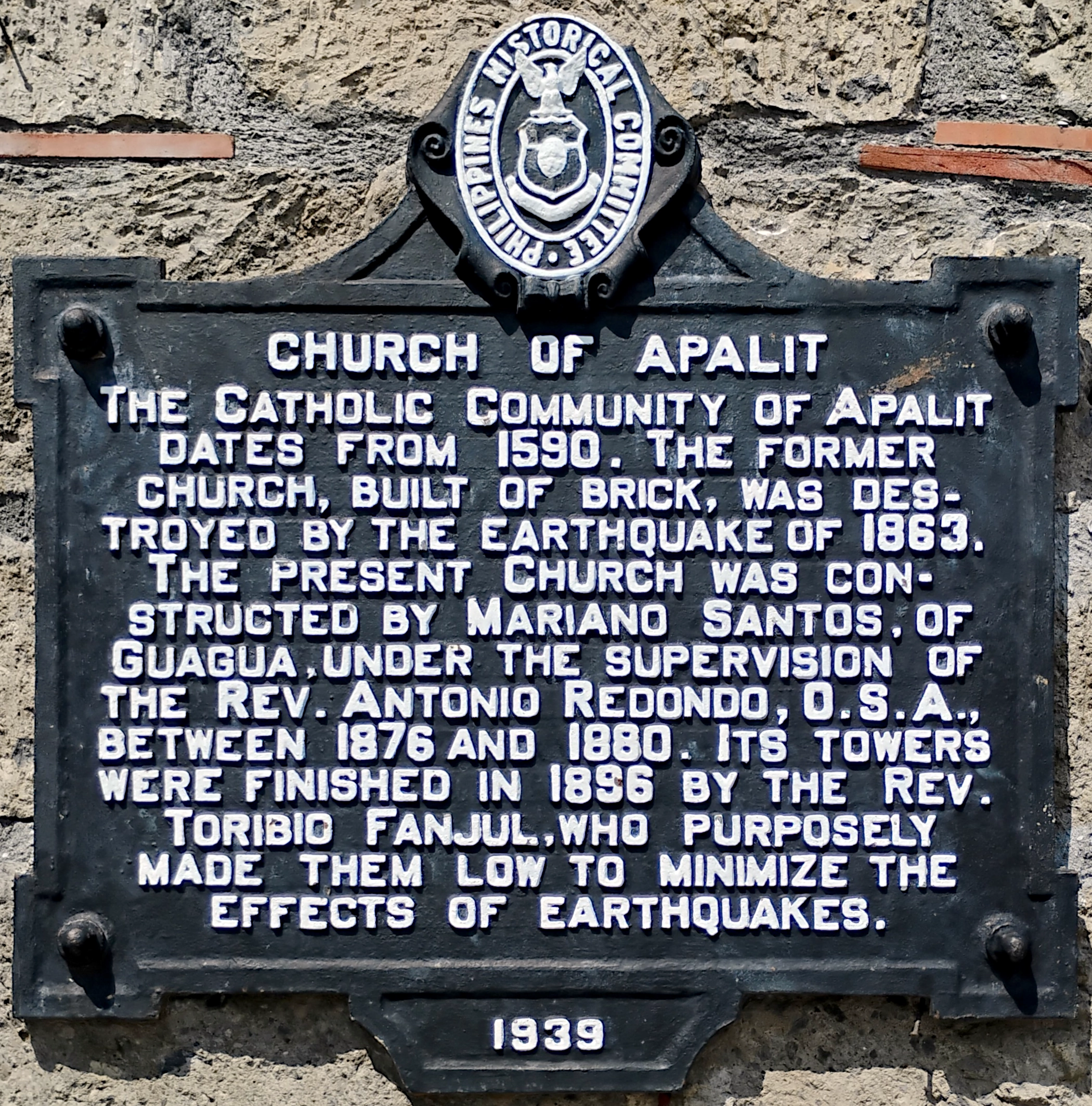
Church PHC historical marker

The marker at the Church of Apalit was installed in 1939 by the Philippines Historical Committee (now the National Historical Commission of the Philippines).
