= Archdiocese of San Fernando =

Archdiocese of the Catholic Church in the Philippines

Coordinates: 15.0285°N 120.6930°E

Archdiocese of San Fernando Archidioecesis Sancti Ferdinandi Arkidiosesis ning San Fernando Arkidiyosesis ng San Fernando Arquidiócesis de San Fernando

Catholic
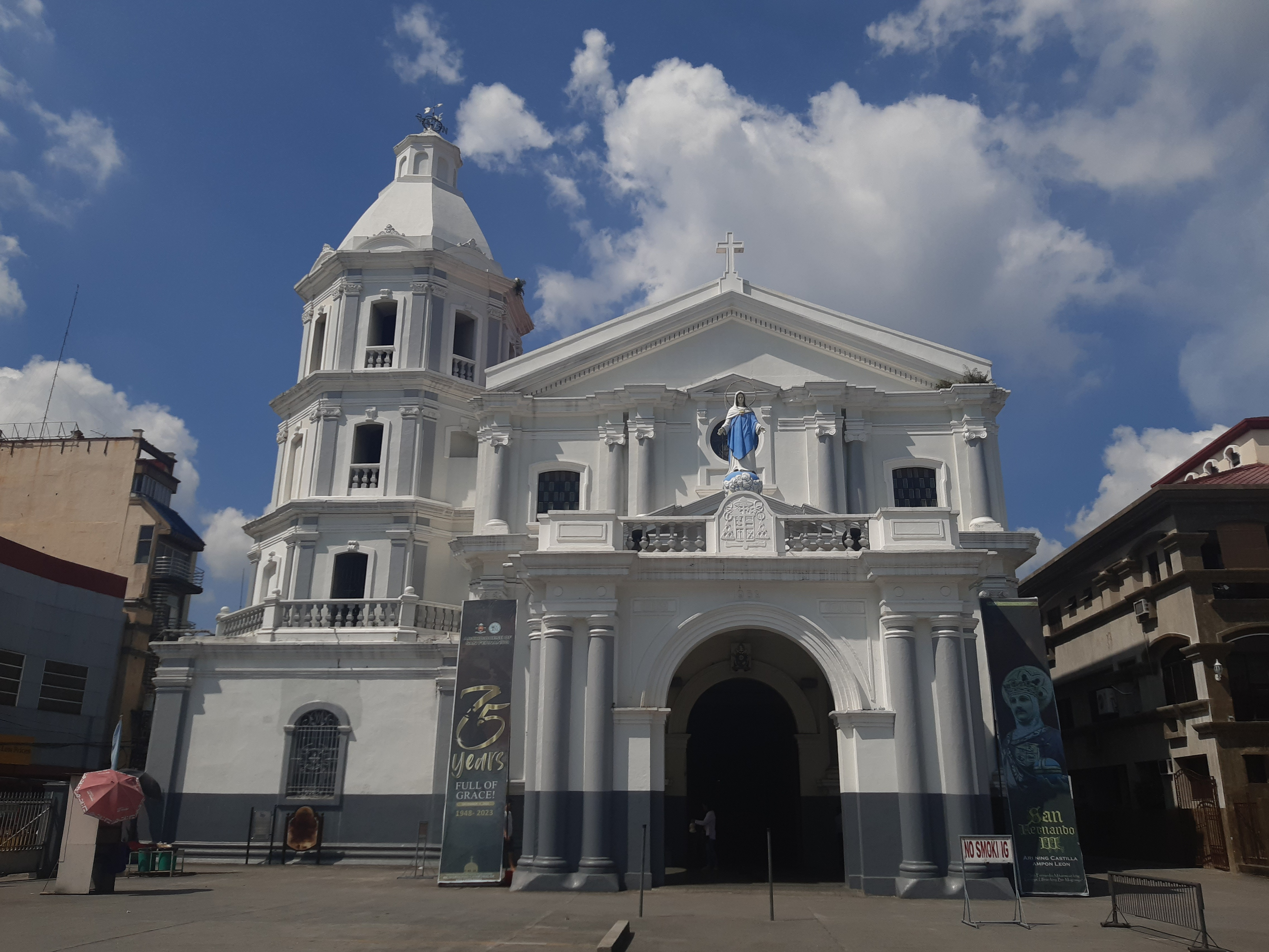
- San Fernando Cathedral, Pampanga

- Coat of arms

Location
- Country: Philippines
- Territory: Pampanga and Angeles City
- Ecclesiastical province: San Fernando

Statistics
- Area: 2,180 km^{2} (840 sq mi)
- Population: Total; Catholics: (as of 2021); 2,900,637; 2,494,547 (86%)
- Parishes: 94

Information
- Denomination: Catholic
- Sui iuris church: Latin Church
- Rite: Roman Rite
- Established: December 11, 1948 (diocese); March 17, 1975 (archdiocese)
- Cathedral: Metropolitan Cathedral of St. Ferdinand
- Patron saint: Virgen De Los Remedios (Patroness of the Province of Pampanga and the Kapampangan People); Sto. Cristo Del Perdon y Caridad (Divine Protector of the Province of Pampanga); St. Ferdinand (Patron of the Archdiocese and City of San Fernando)
- Secular priests: 150

Current leadership
- Pope: Leo XIV
- Metropolitan Archbishop: Florentino Galang Lavarias
- Suffragans: Rufino Sescon Jr. (Balanga); Bartolome Gaspar Santos (Iba); Roberto Mallari (Tarlac)
- Vicar General: Francis Feliciano Dizon
- Bishops emeritus: Paciano Basilio Aniceto

Map
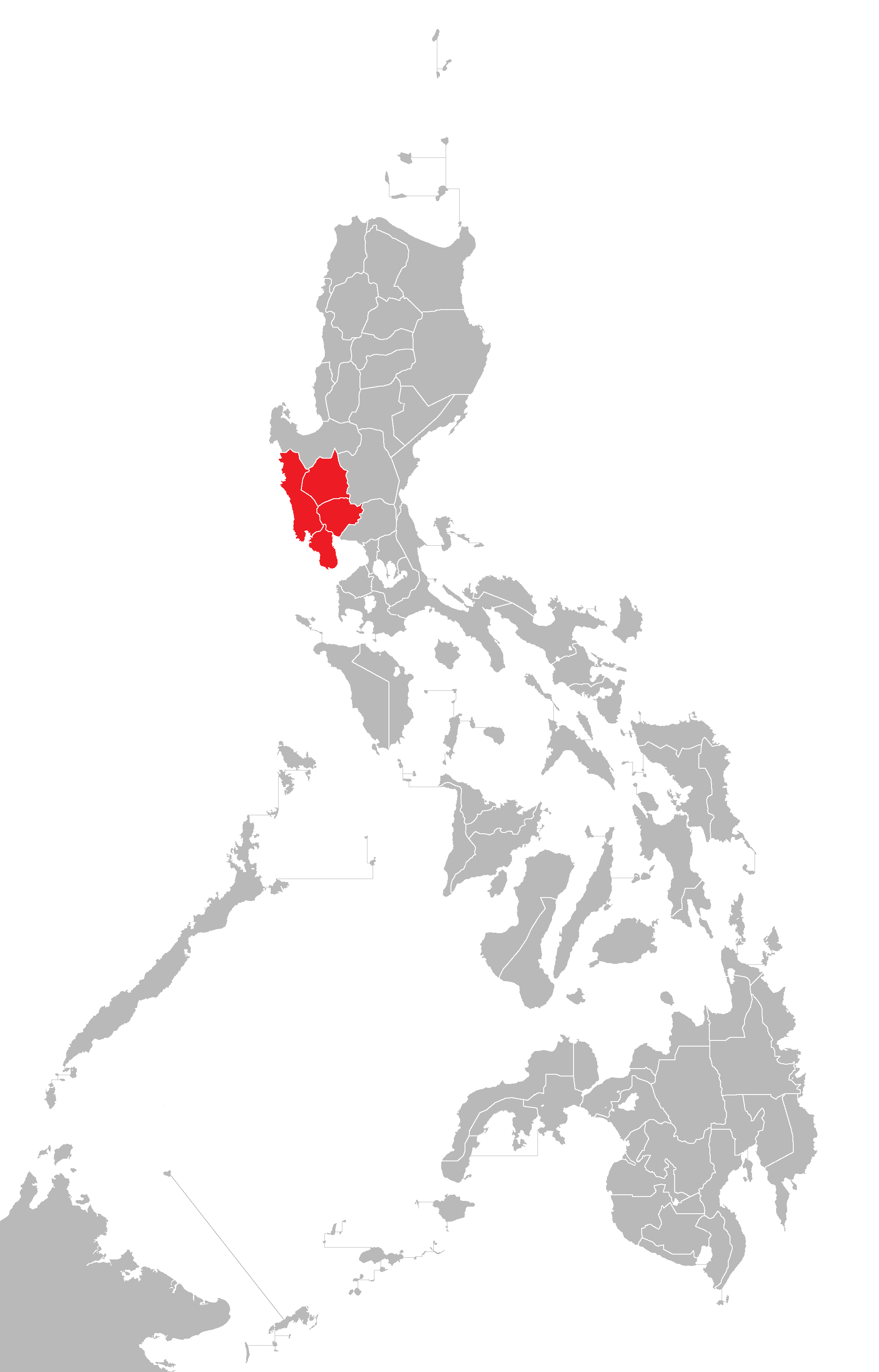
- Jurisdiction of the metropolitan see within the Philippines

The Archdiocese of San Fernando (Latin: Archidioecesis Sancti Ferdinandi; Filipino: Arkidiyosesis ng San Fernando; Spanish: Arquidiócesis de San Fernando; Kapampangan: Arkidiosesis ning San Fernando) is the archdiocese of the Latin Church of the Catholic Church which has territorial jurisdiction over the whole province of Pampanga and Angeles City. The archdiocese is also the metropolitan see of the ecclesiastical province of the same name, which also include three dioceses of its surrounding provinces of Bataan (Diocese of Balanga), Zambales (Diocese of Iba), and Tarlac (Diocese of Tarlac). The cathedral church and seat of the archdiocese is the Metropolitan Cathedral of San Fernando (Pampanga). The Virgin Mary, under the title Virgen de los Remedios, is the principal patroness.

Florentino G. Lavarias, D.D., is the current archbishop of the archdiocese since October 27, 2014, succeeding Paciano B. Aniceto, D.D.

== History ==
=== From diocese to archdiocese ===
The diocese of San Fernando, Pampanga was created on December 11, 1948, through the Apostolic Constitution Probe Noscitur; it comprised the provinces of Pampanga, Bataan, Zambales, parts of Tarlac, and Nueva Ecija. It was initially a suffragan of the Archdiocese of Manila. The first bishop was César María Guerrero, DD, a native of Manila; he received his appointment from the Vatican on May 29, 1949, and was installed on September 8 of the same year. The parish of Our Lady of the Assumption, in the provincial capital town of San Fernando, was selected as the seat of the new diocese; the parish church was thus elevated into a cathedral and was renamed Cathedral of Our Lady of the Assumption.

Bishop Guerrero established the Mater Boni Consilii (now Mother of Good Counsel Minor Seminary) in 1950 (it was originally in Guagua, then Apalit, before being relocated to its present site in San Fernando): the Cruzada de Penitencia y Caridad (or devotion to the Virgen delos Remedios) in 1952, which continues to this day; and Carmelite Monastery in Angeles in 1956, where on March 14, 1957, he retired due to poor health. He died on March 27, 1961, and was buried beside the monastery chapel, according to his wishes.

Eventually the diocese was dismembered when provincial boundaries became more pronounced. Zambales was established as a prelature on October 18, 1955, Nueva Ecija as a diocese on February 16, 1963, Tarlac as a diocese on May 10, 1963, and Bataan as a diocese on March 17, 1975.

Emilio A. Cinense, DD, a native of Guimba, Nueva Ecija, became the second bishop of San Fernando on March 15, 1957. It was during this term that the Diocese of San Fernando was elevated to a Metropolitan See and Archdiocese; the canonical election was held on June 15, 1975. The new archdiocese comprised the whole province of Pampanga with three suffragan dioceses: Tarlac, Iba (Zambales) and Balanga (Bataan).

After the death of Archbishop Cinense, Oscar C. Cruz, DD, a native of Balanga, Bataan, and at the time rector of San Carlos Seminary, was appointed second archbishop of San Fernando on May 22, 1978; he resigned on October 24, 1988. On January 31, 1989, Paciano B. Aniceto of Santa Ana, Pampanga, former rector of the Mother of Good Counsel Seminary and Bishop of Iba, was appointed third (and first Pampanga-born) Archbishop of San Fernando; he was formally installed on March 14, 1989.

On December 11, 1998, the Golden Jubilee anniversary of its creation as a diocese. The Archdiocese of San Fernando's Cathedral of the Assumption was consecrated and rededicated as the Metropolitan Cathedral of San Fernando, during ceremonies presided over by the papal nuncio, Antonio Franco, DD.

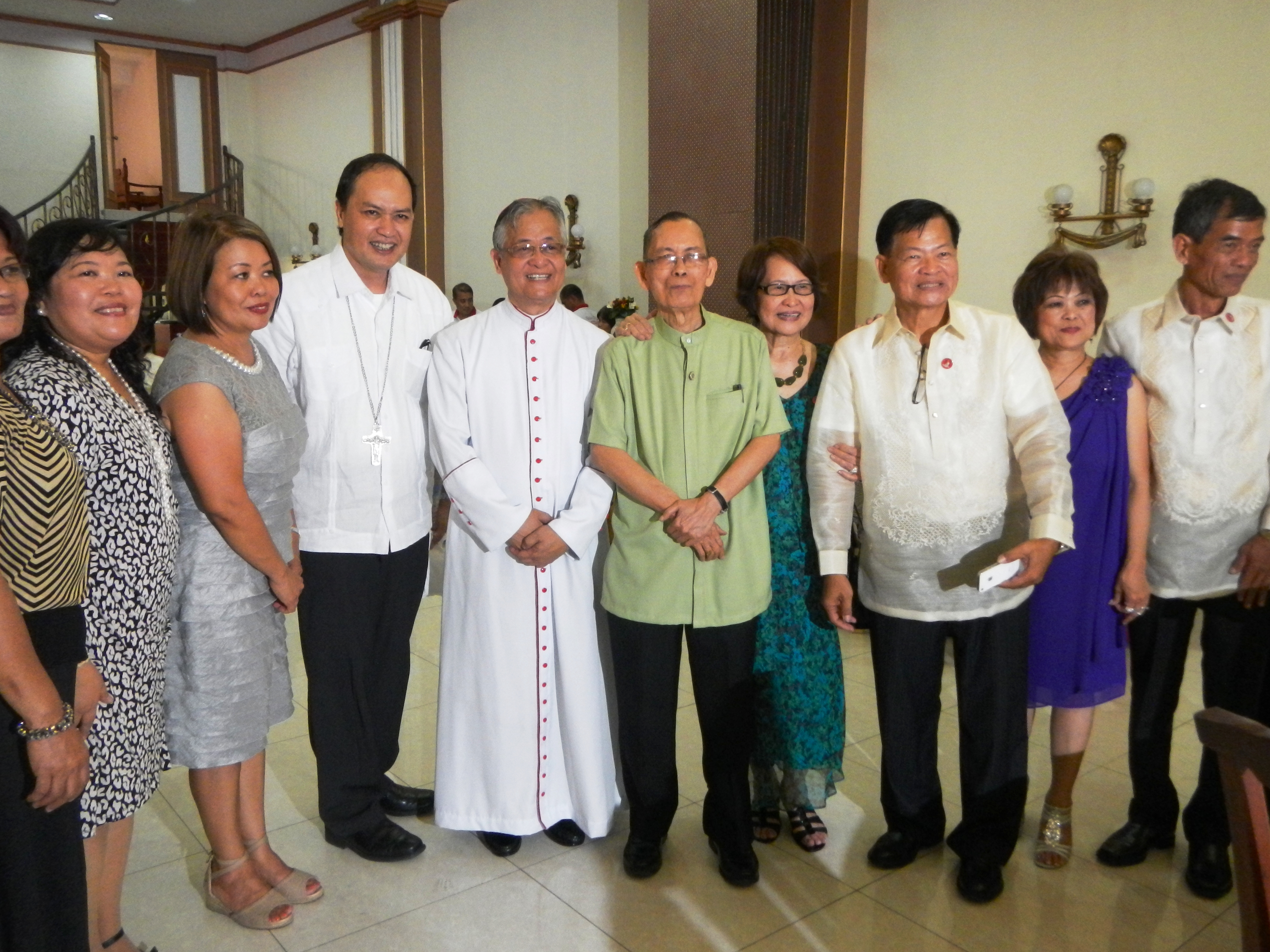
Bishop David, Archbishop Lavarias, and Archbishop-Emeritus Aniceto

== Coat of arms ==
Upon the green terrain rises the lone and majestic Mount Arayat on a red background surmounted by the sword and crown of Saint Ferdinand the King. The rose at base is symbol of Our Lady invoked under her titles as Our Lady of the Assumption (titular of the cathedral) and Our Lady of Remedies (Nuestra Señora de los Remedios).

== Ordinaries ==
Ordinaries of the Diocese/Archdiocese of San Fernando
No.	Portrait	Name	Coat of arms	From	Until	Duration	Notes
Bishops of San Fernando (May 14, 1949 – March 17, 1975)
1		Cesar Maria Guerrero; 1885–1961		14 May 1949	14 Mar 1957	7 years, 10 months	First bishop of the newly erected diocese
2		Emilio A. Cinense; 1911–1978		15 Mar 1957	17 Mar 1975	18 years, 2 days	Became metropolitan archbishop
Metropolitan archbishops of San Fernando (March 17, 1975 – present)
1		Emilio A. Cinense; 1911–1978		17 Mar 1975	5 May 1978	3 years, 1 month, 18 days	First archbishop after elevation to metropolitan status
2		Oscar V. Cruz; 1934–2020		22 May 1978	24 Oct 1988	10 years, 5 months, 2 days	Later appointed as metropolitan archbishop of Lingayen-Dagupan
3		Paciano B. Aniceto; 1937–		14 Mar 1989	27 Oct 2014	25 years, 7 months, 13 days	Longest-serving archbishop to date
4		Florentino G. Lavarias; 1957–		27 Oct 2014	Incumbent	ongoing	Current archbishop

Auxiliary bishops of the Diocese/Archdiocese of San Fernando
No.	Portrait	Name	Coat of arms	From	Until	Duration	Notes
1		Celso N. Guevarra; 1923–2002		20 Jun 1972	8 Nov 1975	3 years, 4 months, 19 days	Became first bishop of Balanga on November 8, 1975, establishing the position
2		Jesus C. Galang; 1932–2004		23 May 1987	7 Dec 1991	4 years, 6 months, 14 days	Became bishop of Urdaneta
3		Roberto C. Mallari; 1958–		14 Jan 2006	15 May 2012	6 years, 4 months, 1 day	Appointed bishop of San Jose, Nueva Ecija
4		Pablo Virgilio S. David; 1959–		27 May 2006	14 Oct 2015	9 years, 4 months, 17 days	Became bishop of Kalookan; later CBCP president

=== Other priests of the archdiocese who became bishops ===
- Roberto Mallari, 4th bishop of Tarlac (March 27, 2025–present)
- + Jesus Castro Galang, 2nd bishop of Urdaneta (December 7, 1991–September 16, 2004)
- + Victor C. Ocampo, 4th bishop of the Diocese of Gumaca (September 3, 2015–March 16, 2023)
- Pablo Virgilio David, 2nd bishop of Kalookan (January 2, 2016–present), 10th Filipino cardinal (beginning December 8, 2024)
- Teodoro Bacani Jr., 1st bishop of Novaliches (January 16–November 25, 2003)
- Celso Nogoy Guevarra, 1st bishop of Balanga (November 8, 1975–June 18, 1998)
- Honesto Flores Ongtioco, 2nd bishop of Balanga (June 18, 1998–August 28, 2003) and 1st bishop of Cubao (August 28, 2003–December 3, 2024)
- Crisostomo Yalung, 2nd bishop of Antipolo (December 3, 2001–December 5, 2002)

=== Monsignors ===
Prelates of Honour

- Msgr. Damaso M. Jingco
- Msgr. Octavio M. Ramos
- Msgr. Ruben C. Lenon
- Msgr. Basilio M. David
- Msgr. Honesto F. Ongtioco (later Bishop of Balanga and Cubao, Apostolic Administrator of Malolos, and now Bishop-emeritus of Cubao)
- Msgr. Crisostomo A. Yalung (later Bishop of Antipolo and now Bishop-emeritus of Antipolo)
- Msgr. Osmundo G. Aguilar
- Msgr. Florentino Guiao
- Msgr. Victorio Diosdado

Chaplains of His Holiness

- Msgr. Emilio L. Lacanlale
- Msgr. Felicito C. Sison
- Msgr. Joel G. Tubig
- Msgr. Jose U. Lacap
- Msgr. Mario F. Ramos
- Msgr. Roberto C. Mallari (now Bishop of Tarlac)
- Msgr. Abelardo S. Basilio
- Msgr. Cenovio M. Lumanog
- Msgr. Edgardo P. Pangan
- Msgr. Florentino M. Canlas
- Msgr. Norberto R. Coronel
- Msgr. Ricardo Jesus T. Serrano
- Msgr. Rustico C. Cuevas
- Msgr. Teodulfo D. Tantengco
- Msgr. Eugenio G. Reyes
- Msgr. Antonio M. Bustos
- Msgr. Antonio Tan del Rosario
- Msgr. Felix A. David
- Msgr. Alfonso G. Ducul
- Msgr. Arsenio M. Yusi
- Msgr. Benjamin S. Henson
- Msgr. Eugenio S. Mercado
- Msgr. Francisco R. Lansang
- Msgr. Gregorio S. Torres
- Msgr. Gregorio L. Canlas
- Msgr. Macario T. Puno
- Msgr. Pablo C. Diaz
- Msgr. Aquilino Ordoñez
- Msgr. Jesus C. Galang (later Bishop of Urdaneta)
- Msgr. José Bondoc
- Msgr. Marcelino de Leon
- Msgr. Pedro G. Magtoto
- Msgr. Alfredo Lorenzo Samia
- Msgr. Paciano B. Aniceto (later Archbishop-emeritus of San Fernando)
- Msgr. Eulalio Y. Pineda
- Msgr. Crispiniano Gópez
- Msgr. Fidel Dahu
- Msgr. Filippo Diaz
- Msgr. Filippo Pangilinam
- Msgr. Florentino Guiao (later Prelate of Honour)
- Msgr. Giuseppe De la Cruz
- Msgr. Jovencio Tantoco
- Msgr. Manuel Baula
- Msgr. Vincenzo Navarro
- Msgr. Manuel C. Sta. Maria

== Suffragan dioceses and bishops ==
Diocese	Image	Bishop	Period in office	Coat of arms
Balanga (Bataan)		Rufino Sescon Jr.	March 1, 2025 – present (1 year, 265 days)	
Iba (Zambales)		Bartolome G. Santos	May 25, 2018 – present (8 years, 180 days)	
Tarlac (Tarlac)		Roberto Mallari	March 27, 2025 – present (1 year, 239 days)	

== The Crusade of the Virgen De Los Remedios & Sto. Cristo Del Perdon y Caridad ==
The crusade, in which the image of Our Lady of Remedies (Virgen de los Remedios) is taken in daily processions all over Pampanga 365 days a year, is tradition that can be found only in the province. Today, however, the original purpose of the crusade—and the Virgin—have long since been forgotten, the fact that the crusade was established to help in the battle against the Communist Hukbalahap in the province in the 1950s.

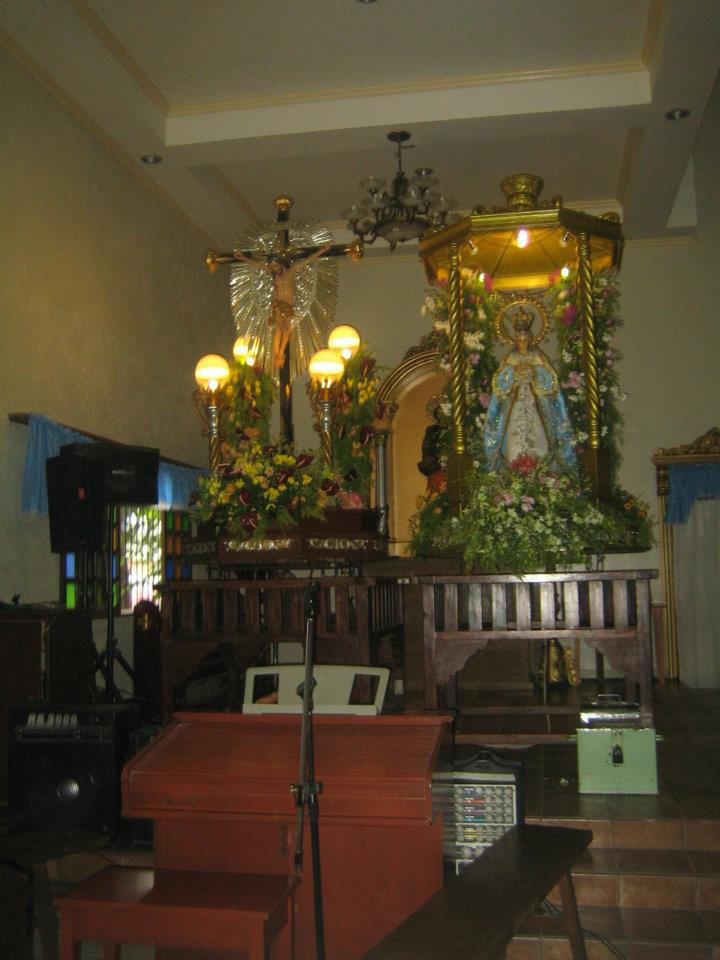
The Crusade of the Virgen De Los Remedios & Sto. Cristo Del Perdon during their visit at Parish of Christ the Prince of Peace in October 2011

On one hand, the original image stays in its original chapel in Baliti, San Fernando City; on the other hand, three replicas have been made to serve as symbols of the crusade. The Baliti faithful recently began actively promoting its shrine as a pilgrimage site, a la Our Lady of Manaoag in Pangasinan. However, for the rest of Pampanga, devotion is mostly directed to the most visible and accessible two pilgrim images which are replicas of the replica; these two images are carried in procession non-stop even to the farthest fishing villages and mountain hamlets. However, the biggest crowds gather (albeit once a year only) around the first replica of the original image, taken out once a year (from the Archdiocesan Chancery) for the annual coronation rites (alternately in San Fernando and Angeles). Thus, there are four identical images of same Virgen de los Remedios: one stationery image in Baliti, another that is kept in the Chancery, taken out only every September 8; and the two pilgrim images constantly going around the province for the crusade. In these processions, the image of the Santo Cristo de Perdon accompanies the Virgen—underscoring the belief of Catholics that the Blessed Virgin helps bring Christ even to the most unreachable people.

=== Beginning of the devotions ===
This all began when the Diocese of San Fernando was created on December 11, 1948, as a separate diocese away from the Archdiocese of Manila. Its first bishop was the Cesar Ma. Guerrero, DD, who immediately identified the most pressing problem of Pampanga as the peasant uprising against the feudal system, fueled by a communist ideology. Socialist mayors were being elected, including those in Angeles and San Fernando; the sonorous sound of the tambuli was a nightly occurrence, and so were parades of peasants waving red flags. The people did go to Mass and pray the Angelus and the rosary, but as Bishop Guerrero said, "Aqui en Pampanga hay mucha piedad, pero poca caridad!" ("Here in Pampanga there is much piety, but little charity!")

After much prayer and reflection, to counteract Communist support among the farmers of Pampanga, Bishop Guerrero established the Cruzada ning Pamanisi at Lugud (Crusade of Penance and Charity), during a meeting held on the third Sunday of February 1952 at the San Guillermo Parish in Bacolor, Pampanga. He appointed the parish's co-adjutor Fr. Diosdado Victorio as director of the Cruzada, who chose the image of the Lady of Remedies (Virgen de los Remedios), then enshrined in the Virgen de los Remedios Parish (not San Roque parish as previously thought) in Brgy. Baliti, San Fernando, Pampanga, as the image that would accompany the Cruzada across the province. It may be deduced that Bishop Guerrero's choice of patron saint may have been influenced by his personal devotion to Virgen de los Remedios, patron saint of Malate, his former parish. The beautiful, shoulder-borne carriage on which the image was mounted was commissioned by Doña Jacinta vda. De Tayag of Bacolor.

The crusade officially started on May 1, 1952, or four years after the birth of the diocese, in the San Miguel Arcangel Parish on Masantol, the southernmost town of Pampanga. Throughout the year well-attended processions marked the transfer of the image from parish to parish.

Part of the tradition of the crusade was the donation of all alms and goods collected from the previously visited parish to the next parish. Soon, the processions of the Virgen de los Remedios featured truckloads of material goods being distributed to the indigent residents; thus, Kapampangan learned to share their processions and the visits of the Virgen became joyous occasions of replenishing both body and spirit.

When all the parishes had been visited by the image of the Virgen, it was the turn of Baliti, its home parish. The people of Baliti sorely missed their beloved Virgin and celebrated their fiesta earlier without the image. When the time came for the crusade's second round of provincial visits, Bishop Guerrero, who had arrived in Baliti to pick up the image, was politely told by Baliti's parish priest, Generoso Pallasingui, that his parishioners would not the allow the image to leave the parish again. Msgr. Jose de la Cruz, now 92, who was present in the meeting, said in a recent interview that Fr. Pallasigui was quite worried that "blood would flow" if Bishop Guerrero insisted on taking the image away. (Apparently the people and their officials had made their feelings clear to the priest earlier.)

The people of Baliti graciously lent the image of their parish patroness for the first year of provincial processions. However, when it was not returned in time for their barrio fiesta, and when talk circulated that the image did not belong to them anymore, but to the entire province, their mood turned from gracious, to sour, to indignation.

Msgr. De la Cruz, then the director of the Kapampangan radio program Ing Siuala nang Maria (The Voice of Mary), recalls that the bishop decided right then and there to have a replica image. "Considering that Baliti was Huk-infested at that time," Msgr. De la Cruz said, "the bishop thought it wise to let the matter rest. Besides, the Cruzada was intended to bring the people closer to God, not away from Him." He said the people may have reacted to an earlier comment he had made on the program that "no single parish owns the Virgen de los Remedios. Every parish that the image visits owns it in the duration of the visit". The comment is canonically sound because all church edifices and all artifacts found inside are technically the property of the diocese, and thus, the image is also considered property owned by the diocese and not by the Crusade.

=== Road to the coronation ===
The first replica was thus hastily made by the late Victoriano Siongco of the Catholic Trade Center of San Fernando. It was so well made that when the processions began for the crusade's year two in late 1953, the people did not realize it was a different image. Bishop Guerrero next decided to apply to the Vatican for permission to have the image canonically crowned.

The criteria for a canonical coronation of a religious image are: (a) there must be widespread devotion around the image; and (b) the image must have proven antiquity. It was the second criterion that made Msgr. De la Cruz pause. Which of the two images should be canonically crowned, the antique Baliti image or the new replica to which popular devotion had now been transferred? Bishop Guerrero told the priest, "Just pray, Pepe."

On the September 8, 1956, more than 70,000 Kapampangans witnessed the canonical coronation of the replica, performed by the pope's emissary to the Philippines, Msgr. Egidio Vagnozzi, held on capitol grounds in San Fernando.

After that, the popular devotion around the crowned image of the Virgen de los Remedios grew even more. Towns that were visited often kept the image way beyond the allotted period, which slowed down the itinerary. It took 10 years or more before the image returned to the same town, which was why people pulled all stops whenever the image finally did come back to their town.

It was also around this time that the image of Santo Cristo del Perdon (Crucified Christ, Lord of Pardon) was added to accompany the Virgen. There was discussion about which image should come first during the procession, until it was decided to put the Santo Cristo del Perdon first, not only to emphasize that Christ should be first (despite the popular belief that the more important should be last) but also since Cruzada is based on penance; the first image that the people should see must be that of suffering.

In 1978 or 1979, San Fernando Archbishop Oscar V. Cruz wanted to solve the problem of the extremely slow pace of the Virgen's provincial rounds. There was a proposal to have nine new images made so that each of the diocese's nine vicariates (cluster of parishes based on geography) would have its own Virgen. Msgr. De la Cruz informed Archbishop Cruz that "It was not the intention of Bishop Guerrero to have multiple images going around." The compromise was reached that only two images should go around, one for the northern towns of Pampanga, and one for the southern towns. Then again, the bishop anticipated debate on which group of towns would get the canonically crowned image and which would get the new one. So he solemnly decided to have two new replicas made for the crusade in the north and the south, while the canonically crowned image would stay in the chancery (Bishop's residence) and would come out only every September 8 for the reenactment of the canonical coronation. (Many Kapampangans today erroneously call the annual event "canonical coronation", but the Virgen was canonically crowned only once, September 8, 1956; the succeeding September 8 events are all merely anniversaries or reenactments of that first and only canonical coronation.)

The two new images were introduced during the 1981 reenactment, held in Minalin. (Reenactments were held in whichever town the Virgen was visiting around the time of the anniversary; however, when flooding worsened after the eruption of Mount Pinatubo, especially in the southern towns, the archdiocese decided to hold the reenactment alternately between San Fernando and Angeles, simply because they are the only towns with enough facilities to accommodate the big crowds and because they are relatively dry during the monsoon season.)

The canonically crowned image visits the archdiocese's vicariates every year before its reenactment of the coronation. This is called Visita Vicariato (lit. Vicariate Visit).

- 2006 - Vicariate of Holy Redeemer
- 2011 - Vicariate of Sacred Heart
- 2015 - Vicariate of Sacred Heart
- 2016 - Vicariate of Mary, Help of Christians
- 2017 - Vicariate of Saint Joseph
- 2018 - Vicariate of Holy Family
- 2019 - Vicariate of Blessed Trinity
- 2020 - Cancelled due to the COVID-19 pandemic
- 2021 - DALO BALEN / Vicariate of Virgen de los Remedios
- 2022 - Vicariate of Saint Augustine of Hippo
- 2023 - Vicariate of Holy Redeemer
- 2024 - Vicariate of Saint John the Beloved
- 2025 - Vicariate of Christ the King
- 2026 - Vicariate of Saint John Maria Vianney
- 2027 - Vicariate of Saint Joseph

== List of parishes/shrines ==
Parish	Address	Year established	Clergy/IES
San Agustin Parish	San Nicolas 1st (Poblacion), Lubao	1572	Arnold S. Rivera
San Andres Apostol Parish	Pescadores (Poblacion), Candaba	1575	Francis F. Dizon
San Guillermo Parish	Cabambangan (Poblacion), Bacolor	1576	Joseph Theodore Valencia
Santa Monica Parish	Parian (Poblacion), Mexico	1581	Rafael Zedec M. Paras (parish priest)
Santa Monica Parish	Parian (Poblacion), Mexico	1581	Ivan Ray G. Torno (resident priest)
Santa Catalina de Alexandria Parish	Poblacion, Arayat	1590	Adrian P. Paule (parish priest)
Santa Catalina de Alexandria Parish	Poblacion, Arayat	1590	Marianito B. Mallari (parochial vicar)
St. Peter the Apostle Parish	San Juan (Poblacion), Apalit	1590	Marcelino B. Mandap (parish priest)
St. Peter the Apostle Parish	San Juan (Poblacion), Apalit	1590	Clark Lois Quiboloy (parochial vicar)
St. Peter the Apostle Parish	San Juan (Poblacion), Apalit	1590	Rogelio C. Yambao (resident priest)
Santa Lucia Parish	Santa Lucia (Poblacion), Sasmuan	1590	Mark G. Manabat (parish priest)
Immaculate Conception Parish	Plaza Burgos (Poblacion), Guagua	1590	Arnolfo Magdaleno F. Serrano
Santa Catalina de Alexandria Parish	Poblacion, Porac	1594	Eduardo T. De Leon
San Bartolome Parish	San Nicolas 1st (Poblacion), Magalang	1605	Juan Danilo L. Dizon
Santiago Apostol Parish	Betis, Guagua	1607	Ely G. Dizon Jr. (parish priest)
Santiago Apostol Parish	Betis, Guagua	1607	Jhon Paul C. Morales (parochial vicar)
San Nicolas de Tolentino Parish	Poblacion, Macabebe	1609	Ariel C. Limjoco
Santa Monica Parish	San Nicolas, Minalin	1614	Pedro G. Valencia
Santa Rita de Cascia Parish	San Jose (Poblacion), Santa Rita	1726	Roland M. Moraleja (parish priest)
Santa Rita de Cascia Parish	San Jose (Poblacion), Santa Rita	1726	Ramon V. Torres (parochial vicar)
Santa Rita de Cascia Parish	San Jose (Poblacion), Santa Rita	1726	Laudemer Mangune (resident priest)
San Luis Gonzaga Parish	Santa Cruz, San Luis	1740	Robert D. Feliciano
Santa Ana Parish	San Joaquin (Poblacion), Santa Ana	1756	Jesus Jr. B. Layug (parish priest)
Santa Ana Parish	San Joaquin (Poblacion), Santa Ana	1756	Romer O. Tubu (resident priest)
Nuestra Señora del Pilar Parish	San Juan (Poblacion), San Simon	1771	Edgar L. Panlilio
Minor Basilica and Parish of Our Lady of the Most Holy Rosary	Sto. Rosario (Poblacion), Angeles City	1829	Manuel D. Santa Maria, PC (parish priest/rector)
Minor Basilica and Parish of Our Lady of the Most Holy Rosary	Sto. Rosario (Poblacion), Angeles City	1829	John Henry Yutuc (parochial vicar/assistant rector)
Minor Basilica and Parish of Our Lady of the Most Holy Rosary	Sto. Rosario (Poblacion), Angeles City	1829	Kavin Adriano Simbulan (parochial vicar/assistant rector)
Minor Basilica and Parish of Our Lady of the Most Holy Rosary	Sto. Rosario (Poblacion), Angeles City	1829	Omar Niño V. Defensor (resident priest)
Minor Basilica and Parish of Our Lady of the Most Holy Rosary	Sto. Rosario (Poblacion), Angeles City	1829	Maverick Angelo M. Pelayo (resident priest)
Minor Basilica and Parish of Our Lady of the Most Holy Rosary	Sto. Rosario (Poblacion), Angeles City	1829	Gian P. Sagum (resident priest)
Saint Joseph the Worker Parish	Poblacion, Floridablanca	1867	Conrado M. David
Our Lady of Grace Parish	Poblacion, Mabalacat City	1880	Reynaldo M. Cruz
San Miguel Arkanghel Parish	Poblcion, Masantol	1894	Venancio D. Viray (parish priest)
San Miguel Arkanghel Parish	Poblcion, Masantol	1894	Conrad Flores (resident priest)
San Vicente Ferrer Parish	Calulut, City of San Fernando	1914	Ferdinand C. Mangulabnan
Santo Tomas Apostol Parish	Poblacion, Sto. Tomas	1929	Sotero Jr. R. Yutuc
Nuestra Señora de la Merced Parish	Bahay Pare, Candaba	1937	John Paul P. Cabrera
Holy Cross Parish	Sapangbato, Angeles City	1938	Emil P. Guiao
Nuestra Señora del Carmen Parish	Duat, Pulungmasle, Guagua	1939	Teodulo M. Franco
San Rafael Arkanghel Parish	Baruya, Lubao	1939	Raphieson A. Mutuc
Nuestra Señora de la Divina Pastora Parish	Balucuc, Apalit	1940	Elmer B. Salonga
San Jose Parish	San Jose Malino, Mexico	1940	Danny Q. Nacpil
San Rafael Arkanghel Parish	San Rafael, Macabebe	1941	Marc Irish A. Santa Ana
San Ignacio de Loyola Parish	Manibaug, Porac	1943	Eymard D. Ocampo
Virgen De Los Remedios Parish	Baliti, City of San Fernando	1943	Aristotle M. Maniago
Metropolitan Cathedral of San Fernando	Santo Rosario, City of San Fernando	1948	Joselito D. Henson (rector)
Metropolitan Cathedral of San Fernando	Santo Rosario, City of San Fernando	1948	Joed L. Mutuc (vice-rector)
Metropolitan Cathedral of San Fernando	Santo Rosario, City of San Fernando	1948	Jefferson G. Bacani (resident priest)
Metropolitan Cathedral of San Fernando	Santo Rosario, City of San Fernando	1948	Joseph Mary D. Bacay (resident priest)
Santo Rosario Parish	Bulacus, Masantol	1950	Carlowie L. Kabigting
Santa Cruz Parish	Santa Cruz, Lubao	1951	Jesus G. Manabat Jr.
Our Lady of Lourdes Parish	Lourdes Sur-East, Angeles City	1954	Enrique M. Luzung (parish priest)
Our Lady of Lourdes Parish	Lourdes Sur-East, Angeles City	1954	Ervin Ray S. Garcia (resident priest)
Virgen De Los Remedios Parish	Sto. Domingo, Minalin	1956	Joselito H. Vital
Saint Michael the Archangel Parish	Anao, Mexico	1955	Carmelo M. Agustin
Our Lady of Victories Parish	Dau, Mabalacat City	1955	Renato G. Sabile
La Consolacion Parish	San Isidro, Guagua	1956	Howell M. Suarez
San Agustin Parish	Caingin, Masantol	1957	Kristian Rei D. Cayanan
Mary, Help of Christians Parish	San Antonio, Bacolor	1957	Joseph Theodore Valencia (administrator)
San Matias Parish	San Matias, Sto. Tomas	1962	Jose B. Bascon
Sto. Niño Parish	Sto. Niño, City of San Fernando	1963	Victor Nicomedes S. Nicdao
San Agustin Parish	San Agustin, City of San Fernando	1965	Lyndon Martin B. Valenton
Immaculate Conception Parish	Balibago, Angeles City	1965	Modesto S. Manalang
Our Lady of Sorrows Parish	Dolores, City of San Fernando	1969	Dino Albert N. Pineda
San Isidro Labrador Parish	Camba, Arayat	1971	Ryan B. Sumang
Virgen De Los Remedios Parish	Dila-dila, Sta Rita	1971	Winifredo S. Santos
Sto. Domingo Parish	Sto. Domingo, Mexico	1979	Stephen B. Susi
San Isidro Parish	San Isidro, Bacolor	1979	Ramil S. Capulong
Santa Teresita Parish	Santa Teresita, Angeles City	1981	Lord Kristoffer R. Beltran
Santa Lucia Parish	Santa Lucia, City of San Fernando	1981	Emiliano M. Dizon Jr.
San Ildefonso Parish	Balitucan, Magalang	1981	Ervin Justin C. Pineda
Virgen de Lourdes Parish	Talang, Candaba	1983	Reagan M. Barrameda
Señor Salvador Parish	Salapungan, Candaba	1985	Mark Anthony M. Torrecarion
Archdiocesan Shrine of Our Lady of Lourdes	Cabetican, Bacolor	1985	Harrold G. Garcia (Administrator)
Santo Rosario Parish	Malusac, Sasmuan	1985	Arjon M. Dela Cruz
San Jose Parish	San Jose, City of San Fernando	1985	Jowel Jomarsus P. Gatus
Holy Family Parish	Colgante, Apalit	1986	Melchor M. Sitchon
San Antonio de Padua Parish	San Antonio, Lubao	1986	Francis Michael S. Mallari
Sacred Heart Parish	Telabastagan, City of San Fernando	1986	Elmer Jose G. Dizon
Santo Rosario Parish	Tinabang, Magalang	1986	Dudley T. Villanueva
Mary, Mother of Perpetual Help Parish	Gutad, Floridablanca	1987	Daniel A. Baul
St. Joseph Parish	Cabalantian, Bacolor	1989	Alex Tan Dizon
San Roque Parish	San Roque-Dau, Lubao	1990	Jeffrey Louie L. Maghirang
Santo Rosario Parish	Pau, Sto. Tomas	1991	Jaycar Z. Silva
Saint Jude Thaddeus Parish	St. Jude Vil, San Agustin, City of San Fernando	1991	Rev. Msgr. Ricardo Jesus T. Serrano, PC
San Lorenzo Ruiz Parish	Dau, Mabalacat City	1991	Jesus D. Salvador
San Agustin Parish	San Agustin, Santa Ana	1992	John Anthony D. Tordera
Divine Mercy Parish	San Jose, Floridablanca	1994	Reynaldo P. Garcia
Christ the King Parish	Pulung Cacutud, Angeles City	1994	Reynaldo D. Dela Cruz
Holy Spirit Parish	Marisol Subdivision, Angeles City	1995	Al III R. Manacmul
Good Shepherd Parish	Bulaon Resettlement, City of San Fernando	1995	Aljim M. Tuazon
The Lord's Presentation Parish	Batasan, Macabebe	1996	Mark Christopher De Leon
The Lord's Annunciation Parish	San Vicente, Mexico	1996	Paul T. Velasco
The Lord's Baptism Parish	Pasig, Candaba	1996	John Cenon D. Tulio
Holy Eucharist Parish	San Miguel, Magalang	1996	Ernesto P. David
San Rafael Parish	Mabiga, Mabalacat City	1996	Enrico C. De Guzman (Parish Priest)
San Rafael Parish	Mabiga, Mabalacat City	1996	Harold De Guzman (Parochial Vicar)
The Lord's Epiphany Parish	San Francisco, Magalang	1996	Elmer D. Magat
The Lord's Ascension Parish	Lourdes Heights Subd., City of San Fernando	1996	Ronnie D. Cao
Parish of the Lord's Transfiguration	L&S Subdivision, Sto. Domingo, Angeles City	1996	Deogracias Kerr S. Galang
Santo Cristo del Perdon Parish	Villa Julita Subd., City of San Fernando	1996	Larry S. Miranda
The Lord's Resurrection Parish	Madapdap Rest., Dapdap, Mabalacat City	1996	Ramon Macasiog
Christ the Light of the Nations Parish	Model Community Pinatubo Rest., Pio, Porac	1998	Gabriel II P. Mecado
Good Shepherd Parish	Pandacaqui Rest., Pandacaqui, Mexico	1998	Marvin M. Sinlao
Christ the Prince of Peace Parish	Mauaque Rst., Sapang Biabas, Mabalacat City	1998	Eisen John Matreo Cruz
Blessed Trinity Parish	Pilar Village, City of San Fernando	2000	Angel Amir R. Gamboa
Christ the Eternal High Priest Parish	Sulipan, Apalit	2001	Israel S. Garcia
Christ the Divine Healer Parish	Santa Lucia Rest., Santa Lucia, Magalang	2001	Alfred I. David
Jesus, the Lamb of God Parish	Mauli, Pulungmasle, Guagua	2002	Joseph G. Hernandez
Sacred Heart Parish	Palmayo Resettlement, Floridablanca	2003	Jason B. Canlas
Most Holy Name of Jesus Parish	San Roque-Bitas, Arayat	2004	Jobert M. Villacorte
Jesus, the Eternal Word Parish	Anunas, Angeles City	2007	Norman G. Vitug
Archdiocesan Shrine of Apung Mamacalulu	Lourdes Sur, Angeles City	2009	Nolasco L. Fernandez (Rector)
Our Lady of Fatima Parish	Hensonville Subd., Malabañas, Angeles City	2009	Emmanuel S. Contreras
Conversion of Saint Paul Parish	San Pablo I, Lubao	2010	Jonathan Raymund M. Bartolome
San Pedro Calungsod Parish	Santa Catalina, Minalin	2019	Ricarthy D. Macalino
Our Lady of Sorrows Parish	Xevera Subd., Tabun, Mabalacat City	2022	Gregorio G. Vega
Our Lady of the Poor Parish	Villa Maria, Porac	2025	Regnel C. Fuertez

== Other pastoral assignments ==
Office	Clergy	Pastoral assignment
Mother of Good Counsel Seminary	Kenneth Dizon Alde	Seminary Rector
Mother of Good Counsel Seminary	Mark Andrew S. Simbul	Director, Configuration Stage
Mother of Good Counsel Seminary	Marvin P. Dizon	Spiritual Director, Configuration Stage
Mother of Good Counsel Seminary	Benjamin B. Espiritu III	Dean of Studies, Major Seminary
Mother of Good Counsel Seminary	Jayson B. Miranda	Director, Discipleship Stage
Mother of Good Counsel Seminary	Anthony O. Cortez	Spiritual Director, Discipleship Stage
Mother of Good Counsel Seminary	Jerome C. Roque	Director, Propaedeutic Stage
Mother of Good Counsel Seminary	John Lu Allan M. Nucum	Spiritual Director, Propaedeutic Stage
Mother of Good Counsel Seminary	John Florand L. Cortez	Director, Minor Seminary
Mother of Good Counsel Seminary	Jasper Laurence C. Sanita	Spiritual Director, Minor Seminary
Mother of Good Counsel Seminary	June Novelo Siccion	Seminary Procurator
Bahay Pag-Ibig	Fiel Louie N. Pareja	Director
Domus Pastorum	Gabriel J. Torres	Director
San Padre Pio Chapel (Jose B. Lingad Memorial Hospital)	Joel B. Fronda	Chaplain
Social Action Center of Pampanga (SACOP)	Justin G. Gatus	Director
Arzobispado de San Fernando	Norman S. Arce	Oeconome
Arzobispado de San Fernando	Kenneth D. Basilio	Assistant Oeconome
Virgen De Los Remedios Repository Chapel	Norman S. Arce	Administrator
University of the Assumption	Oliver G. Yalung	University President
University of the Assumption	Edgar R. Calma	Vice-President for Administration
University of the Assumption	Christian Kierr Tallorin	University Chaplain
ASF Radio Station	Joseph Mary D. Bacay	Administrator
Angeles University Foundation	Ervin Ray S. Garcia	University Chaplain
Holy Angel University	Omar Niño V. Defensor	University Chaplain
Munting Tahanan ng Nazareth	Red H. Jaldo	Director
Office of the Roman Catholic Archbishop and Chancery Department	John Paul T. Toting	Secretary to the Archbishop and Notary for Canonical Books
Chancery Department	Danny Q. Nacpil	Chancellor
Chancery Department	Jasper Laurence C. Sanita	Vice-Chancellor

== See also ==
- Catholic Church in the Philippines
- List of Catholic dioceses in the Philippines
