= San Vicente Ferrer Church (Calulut) =

Roman Catholic church in Pampanga, Philippines

Coordinates: 15°05′42″N 120°38′55″E

San Vicente Ferrer Parish Church
- Saint Vincent Ferrer Parish Church
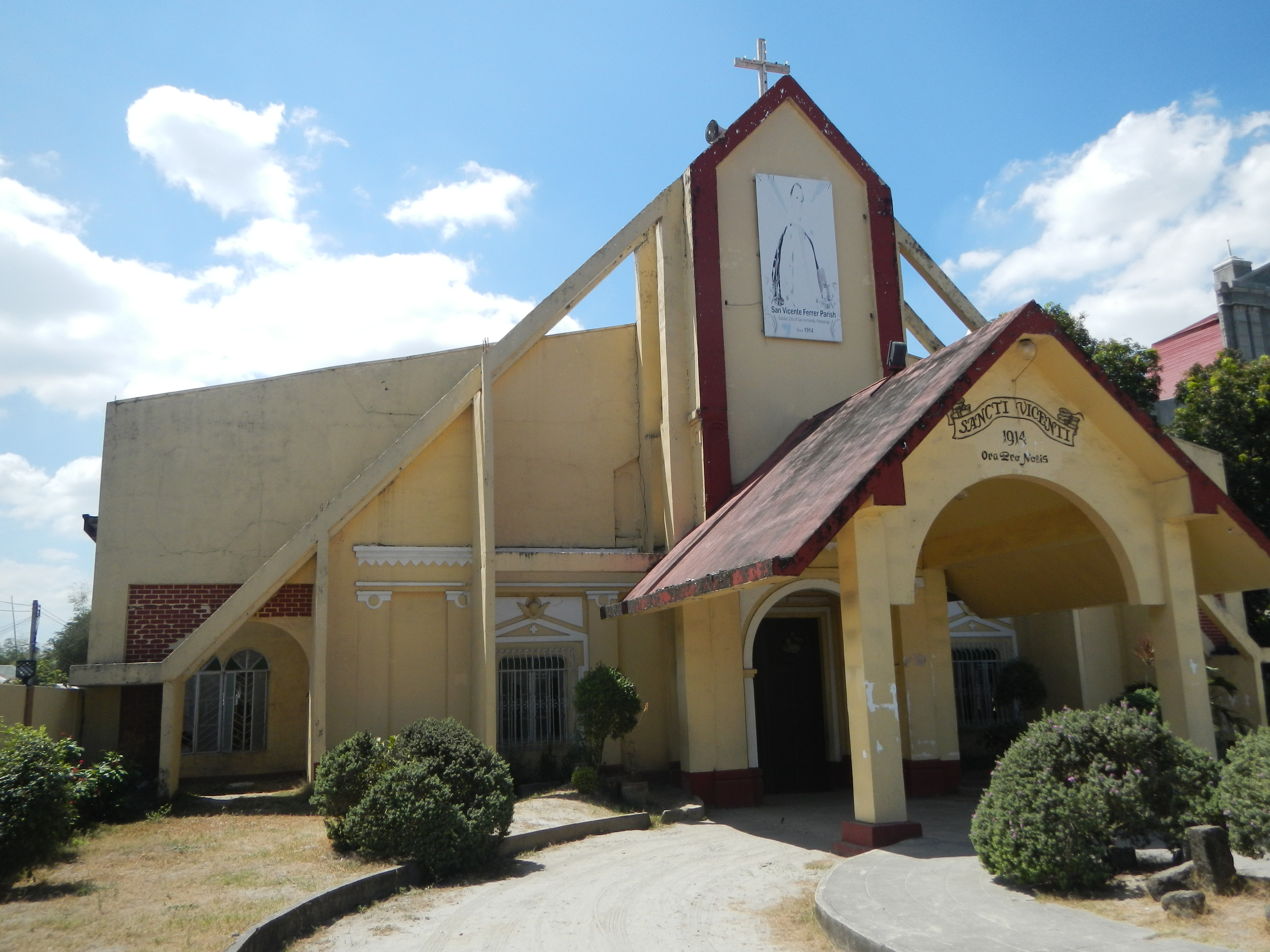
- Old Church façade in 2014

- Location in Luzon Location in the Philippines
- Location: Calulut, San Fernando, Pampanga
- Country: Philippines
- Denomination: Roman Catholic

History
- Status: Parish church
- Dedication: St. Vincent Ferrer

Architecture
- Functional status: Active
- Architectural type: Church building

Administration
- Province: San Fernando
- Metropolis: San Fernando
- Archdiocese: San Fernando
- Deanery: Virgen de los Remedios

Clergy
- Priest: Rev. Fr. Ferdinand C. Mangulabnan

San Vicente Ferrer Parish Church is a Roman Catholic church located in Calulut, San Fernando, Pampanga, Philippines. It is under the jurisdiction of the Archdiocese of San Fernando. Established as a parish in 1914, it originally encompassed 28 barangays from as far as Anao in Mexico to the east, Dolores to the south, Telabastagan to the north and a number of villages of San Fernando on the west side along what is now known as MacArthur Highway.

== History ==
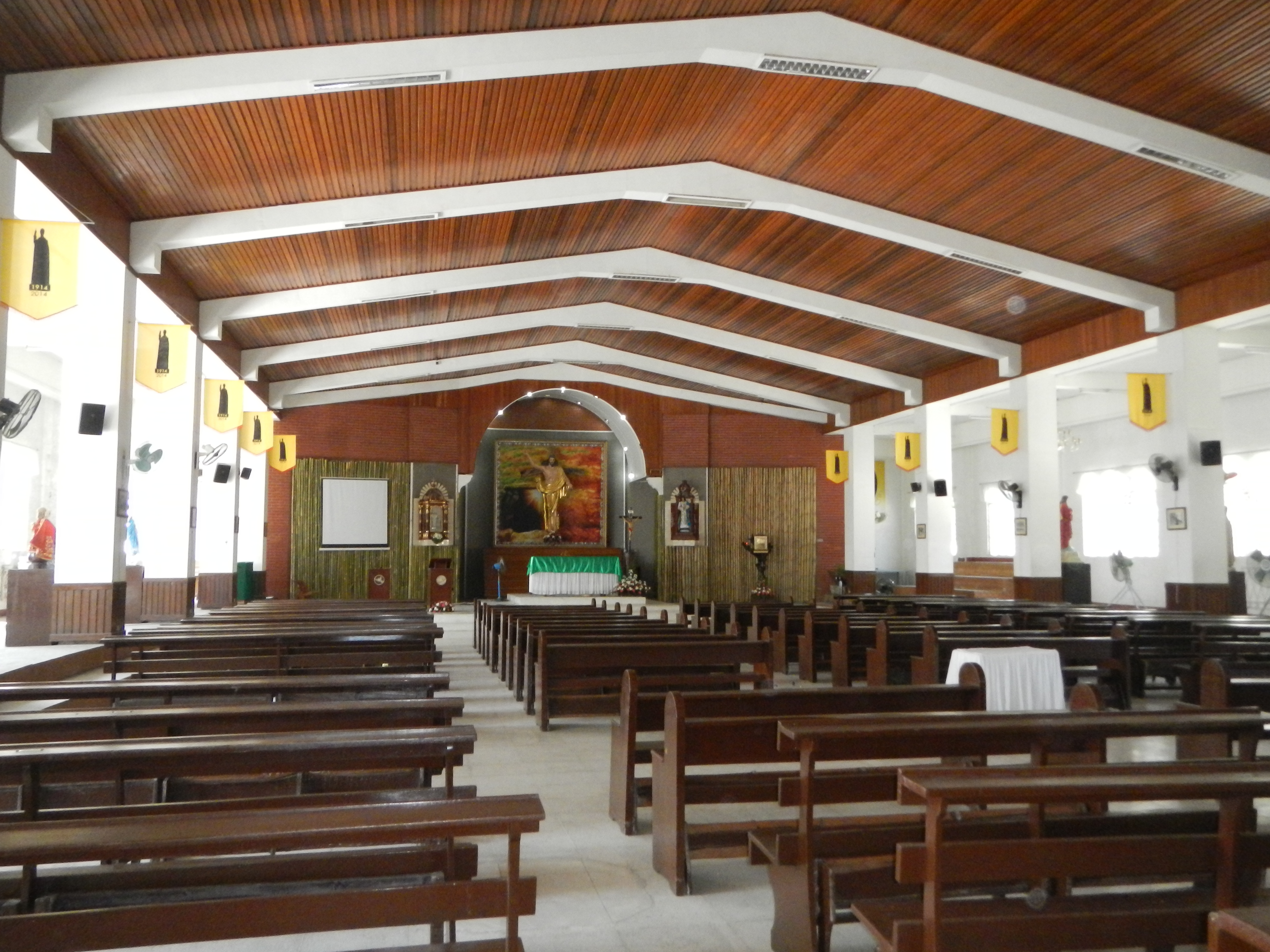
Church interior in 2014

At the time of its canonical erection in 1914, the parish was under the jurisdiction of the Archdiocese of Manila. However, the growing number of the faithful led to the establishment of more parishes that were established by Archbishop Michael J. O'Doherty. These were St. Joseph Parish in Brgy. Malino, Mexico in 1941 and Our Lady of Remedies Parish in Brgy. Baliti in 1943, leaving eight barangays under the parish. This was further whittled down to six barangays with the erection of St. Augustine Parish in 1965. The remaining barangays were Calulut (parish center), Sindalan, Dela Paz, Bulaon, San Rafael and Malpitic.

The 1991 eruption of Mount Pinatubo and its aftermath affected the boundaries of the parish. A sizeable resettlement community was established in Brgy. Bulaon, prompting the creation of the Personal Parish of the Good Shepherd in 1995. In 1996, the Lord's Ascension Parish was established in Dela Paz Sur, which included the western part of Sindalan. At present, there is a move by the residents of Brgys. San Rafael, Malpitic and Bulaon to join the Parish of the Good Shepherd. If this move is realized, the present parish boundaries will further shrink to include only the whole of Brgy. Calulut and the eastern portion of Brgy. Sindalan.

Most of the parishioners then were tenants and farm workers who toiled in the sugar cane fields. Others relied on small farming lots for their income. With the land reform program of the government in the 1970s, many tenants became small landowners. The construction of farm-to-market roads in the same period also facilitated the marketing of their products. However, during the economic crunch of the 1980s, the lots were eventually sold and transformed into fish ponds and poultry farms, with financing from big food processing companies. Other areas were converted into residential and industrial areas as well as memorial parks.

== Festivals ==
San Vicente Ferrer's feast day falls on April 5. In the past, it was customary to bring the images of all village patron saints to the parish church during the patronal fiesta and the nine-day Misa de Gallo preceding Christmas. Most parishioners hiked from their village of origin; those who could afford took the gareta and calesa. These events were well-attended social and ecclesiastical affairs.

Aside from the patronal fiesta, another major parish feast is the "Fiestang Corazon" (Feast of the Sacred Heart) on the third Saturday of October. According to tradition, the harvest season is the reason why this feast is celebrated in October instead of 19 days after Pentecost, on a Friday in June or July according to the present General Roman Calendar. Unknown to many, the parishioners were on the right liturgical track. Research shows that before the reforms of Second Vatican Council, the original feast of the Sacred Heart fell on the Sunday before the feast of Christ the King, which was celebrated at the end of October.

== Priests ==
The First parish priest was Fr. Pedro Paulo S. Santos (1914–1917), who later became the Archbishop of Nueva Caceres in Bicol. The first church edifice was constructed through his efforts, with the facade personally designed by him.

Fr. Casto Ocampo (1917–1919) was from the town of Sta. Rita in Pampanga. He promoted the devotion to the Sacred Heart of Jesus through the Cofradia del Sagrado Corazon de Jesus, and to him is attributed the annual celebration of Fiestang Corazon. He was followed by Rev. Fr. Felipe Romero (1919–1924) and Fr. Jacinto Vergara (1924–1930). The latter is still remembered for the ritual of "Tenieblas"* during the evening of Holy Wednesday before the Holy Mass.

Between 1930 and 1932, Fr. Artemio Pascual took charge of the parish. His brief tenure (due to ill health) is still remembered for bringing back many Aglipayans in Brgy. San Rafael to the Catholic faith. Fr. Pascual was succeeded by Fr. Getulio Inggal (1932–1937), whose term was marked by his struggle with the Socialist Party in church affairs. Fr. Lazaro Pineda (1937–1942) renovated the parish rectory. He was followed by Fr. Melencio Garcia (1942–1949), Fr. Pedro Capati (1949–1950) and Fr. Restituto Canda (1950–1951).

The parish priest who served longest was Msgr. Odon T. Santos (1951–1967). He is best remembered for his dream of transforming Calulut into a "city". He renovated the chalet-style rectory into a two-storey building. He also built a permanent stage on the church patio and installed the image of the Sacred Heart of Jesus in front of the church. It was during his time that many mandated organizations were organized.

Msgr. Aquilino D. Ordonez (1967–1976) made his mark on the parish for two things: his passion for spiritual renewal and his concern for the economic development of the parishioners. The first was done through the Cursillo which became popular as a Christian renewal movement. He allowed the use of the rectory as a Cursillo House where hundreds of parishioners went through a "reconversion". The second was achieved through vocational classes such as dressmaking and electronics, farm demonstrations, animal husbandry, home gardening, piggery and poultry-raising. He also introduced the Samahang Nayon and the Green Revolution program to the farmers. All these were achieved with the assistance of various government agencies.

One parish priest whose memory is still very alive in the parish was Msgr. Gregorio L. Canlas (1976–1984). Fresh from his travels abroad, Msgr. Canlas introduced innovations and promoted active lay participation in liturgical celebrations. His stay in the parish was marked in what is now known as "The Golden Age of Kapampangan Liturgical Music". His musical talents produced many liturgical songs that are still very popular today.

Msgr. Canlas encouraged Scripture reading and reflection by organizing bible study and bible sharing groups. With the help of the Daughters of Charity, he promoted the Visita Domicilliaria, in which neighborhood families were organized into groups of thirty. The main feature of the "Visita" was the one-day visit of the image of the Miraculous Medal of the Virgin Mary to each member-family. In addition, each of the four "puroks of Calulut" were organized into a "Coro", identified by a Marian title. Thus, Patad/Mabalas became known as "Fatima", Centro was "Lourdes", the New Barrio was called "Del Carmen", and Pau was known as "Virgen de los Remedios". Once a month, Msgr. Canlas would visit each "Coro" to celebrate the Holy Eucharist. In hindsight, it can be said that the experience was the parish's precursor to building small ecclesiastical communities. Msgr. Canlas also emphasized catechetical instruction for the young, by professionally training and organizing volunteer catechists. He made catechism classes a requirement in all elementary schools and in the High schools of Sindalan and Calulut, catechism classes every Friday evening. Before he ended his term, Msgr. Canlas facilitated the purchase of an additional cemetery lot for the parish.

Msgr. Abelardo S. Basilio succeeded Msgr. Canlas from 1984 to 1991. It was during his incumbency that the construction of a new rectory and the renovation of the church building were initiated. Both projects became successful because of the support and cooperation of the "Coros" and concerned parishioners. The construction was about to finish when he was assigned to a new parish. With the sustained cooperation of the people, Fr. Resurreccion G. Diwa (1991–1999) finished the construction. The facade of the present church was designed and constructed during his term.

Fr. Adrian P. Paule, started his term in 1999 by reorganizing the Parish Pastoral Council and renovating the rectory. But the biggest impact of Fr. Paule's ministry so far is his pastoral vision that is open to lay participation. Since he began his term, parishioners have been experiencing creative and meaningful pastoral activities leading towards the celebration of the parish's 90th Foundation Anniversary. Highlights of this renewed pastoral outlook is the construction of the new parish church and the drawing up of an integrated parish pastoral renewal plan, where lay participation has been emphasized. The presence of two religious congregations, the St. Paul's Novitiate (priests and brothers) and the Congregation of the Dominican Sisters of Ilanz has also helped in the pastoral development of the parish. With the phaseout of the Ilanz sisters in Calulut, the local congregation of the Dominican Sisters of Our Lady of Remedies took over the apostolic endeavor started by the former.

Fr. Regnel “Ching” Fuertez started his term in 2013, over seeing the parish’s 100th anniversary in 2014. His term ended in 2019.

Fr. Jesus “Jess” G. Manabat became parish priest in 2019. Through his leadership, the parish finished the new church that started under Fr. Adrian Paule, and was dedicated in 2021. Fr. Jess also lead the parish through the harsh pandemic by over seeing the many medical missions in the parish. Fr. Jess made many changes to the new church by finishing the dome, re-structuring the retablo and more. The parish also hosted the 65th Canonical Coronation of the Virgen de los Remedios in 2021, where the apostolic nuncio to the Philippines, Most Rev. Charles J. Brown, D.D. presided over, through the help of Fr. Jess. His term ended in 2025.

The present parish priest is now Rev. Fr. Ferdinand “Ferdie” C. Mangulabnan.
