= Santa Ana Parish Church (Pampanga) =

Roman Catholic church in Pampanga, Philippines

- Parokya ni Santa Ana (Filipino); Pisamban Bale Matua (Kapampangan); Parroquia de Santa Ana (Spanish)
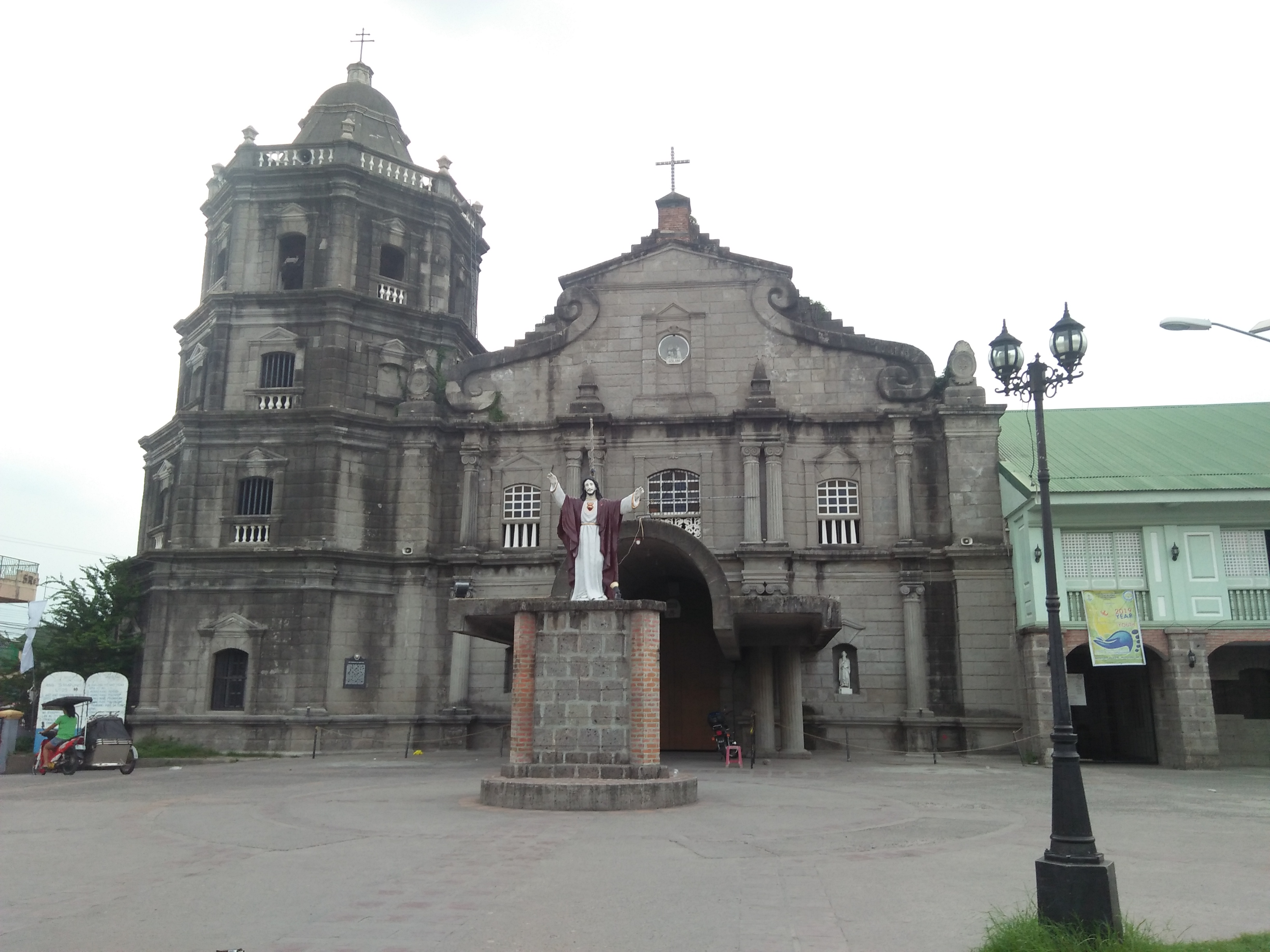
- Church facade in 2019

- Location in Luzon Location in the Philippines
- 15°05′41″N 120°45′57″E
- Location: San Joaquin (Poblacion), Santa Ana, Pampanga
- Country: Philippines
- Denomination: Roman Catholic

History
- Founded: 1598
- Founder: Augustinians
- Dedication: Saint Anne
- Dedicated: 1617

Architecture
- Functional status: Active
- Architectural type: Church building
- Style: Baroque
- Groundbreaking: 1853
- Completed: 1857

Administration
- Province: Ecclesiastical Province of San Fernando
- Archdiocese: Roman Catholic Archdiocese of San Fernando

Clergy
- Archbishop: Most. Rev. Florentino G. Lavarias, D.D.
- Priest(s): Rev. Fr. Jesus B. Layug, Jr. Rev. Fr. Romer O. Tubu

Santa Ana Parish Church (Kapampangan: Pisamban Bale Matua), is a Roman Catholic church located in Barangay San Joaquin (Poblacion), Santa Ana, Pampanga, Philippines. It is dedicated to Saint Anne and is under the ecclesiastical jurisdiction of the Archdiocese of San Fernando. The 19th-century church remains significant religious landmark for the Kapampangan faithful and is especially revered for enshrining an ex ossibus (bone relic) of Saint Anne, contributing to its prominence as a site of devotion and pilgrimage.

== History ==
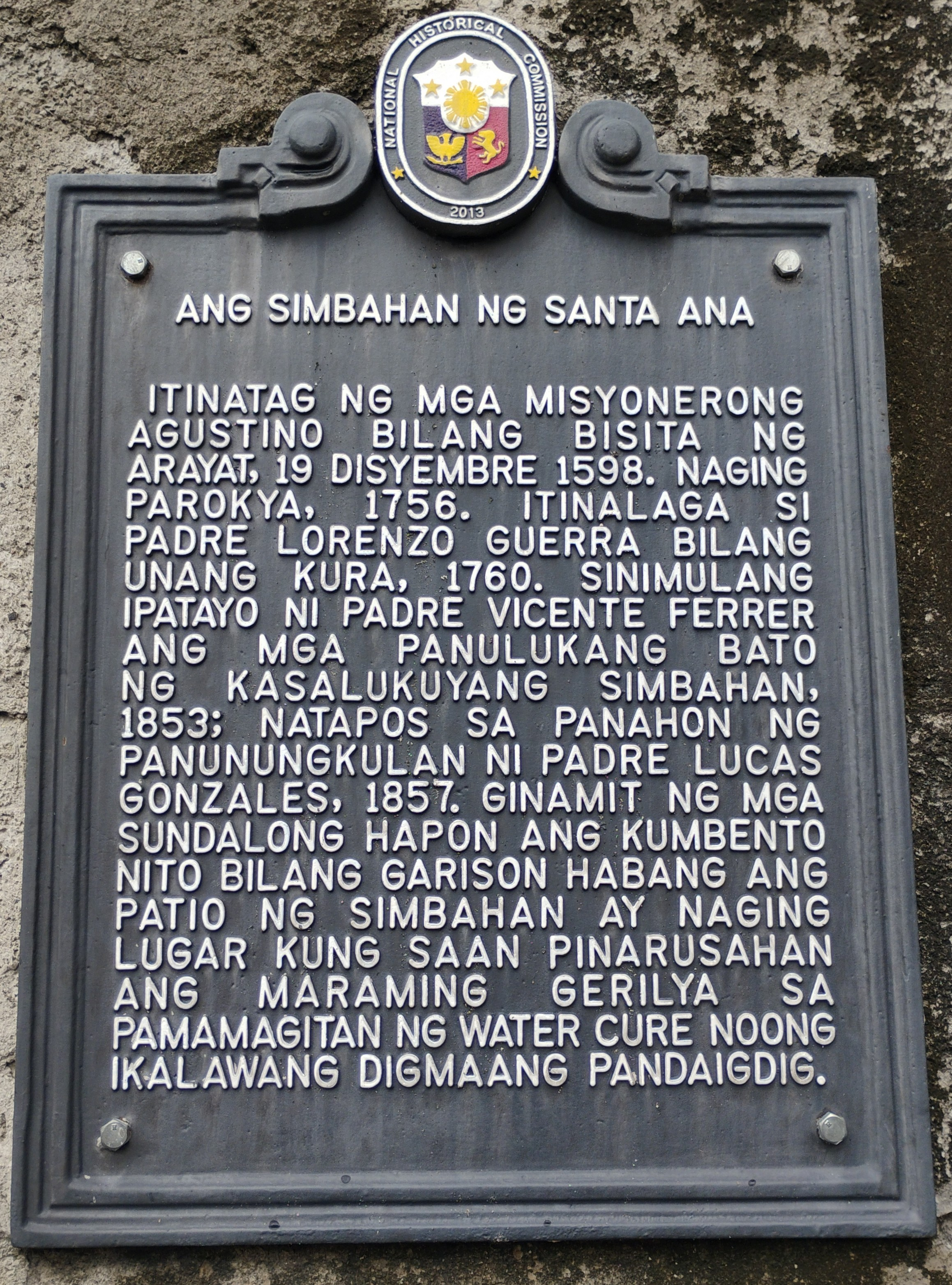
Church NHC historical marker installed in 2013

In December 19, 1598, the church was founded by Augustinian friars as a visita of Arayat. It was during the American era, the town of Pinpin (now Santa Ana, Pampanga) attained full municipal independence. On April 29, 1617, Augustinian missionaries formally placed the town under the patronage of Señora Santa Ana, mother of the Blessed Virgin Mary.

In 1756, the visita had been elevated to parish status, with Fr. Lorenzo Guerra later served as its first priest in 1760. The present stone-and-brick church was begun in 1853 under Fr. Vicente Ferrer and completed in 1857 by Fr. Lucas Gonzalez, who also supervised the construction of its five-tiered belfry.

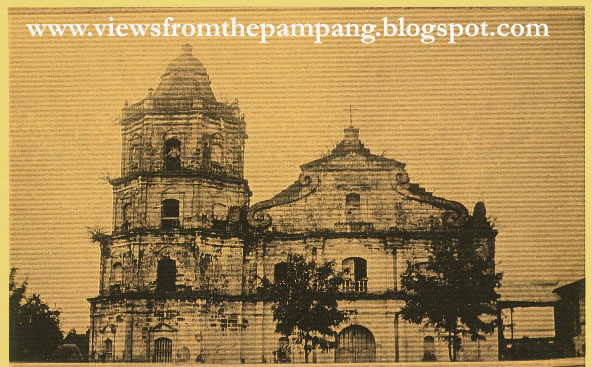
Old photo of Santa Ana Parish

An undated historical document preserved in the archives of Valladolid, Spain, provides a detailed account of the materials and expenditures for the church’s construction, noting that stone was quarried from Meycauayan, Bulacan while timber was sourced from Betis and Porac. The Kapampangan historian Mariano Henson later recorded the dedication of the church’s five bells: Nuestra Señora de la Paz, Nuestra Señora de la Consolación y Correa, San Agustin, Santo Cristo, and Santa Ana. These bells were donated during the 1870s.

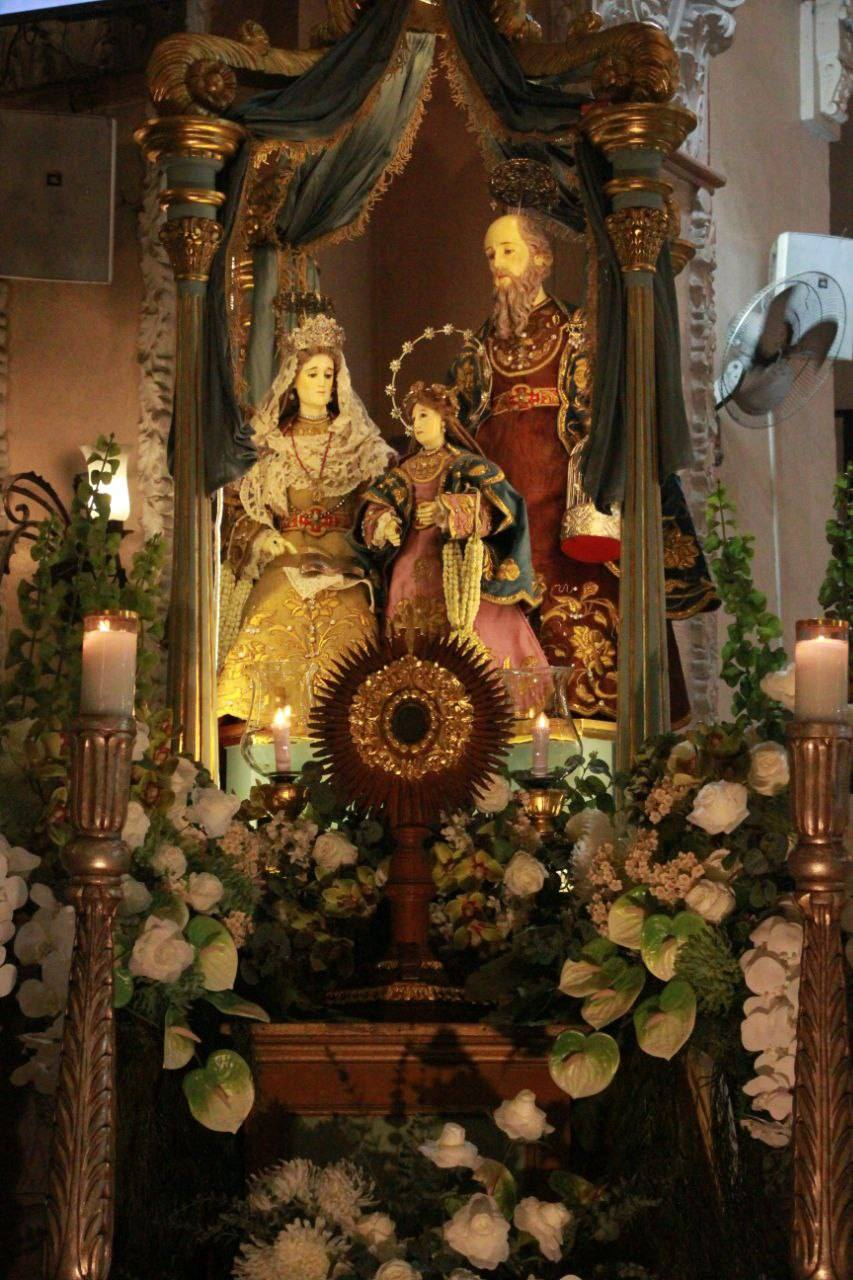
Relic of Saint Anne together with the image of Saint Anne, Saint Joachim, and the Blessed Virgin Mary

In 1866, Fr. Antonio Redondo constructed the adjoining wooden stone convent. Restoration efforts commenced in 1872 under Fr. Francisco Diaz and were continued in 1877 by Fr. Paulino Fernandez. The church interior underwent further modifications in the 1930s, including the installation of a second retablo.

During the Japanese occupation of the Philippines in the Second World War, the convent was requisitioned as a military garrison, while the church grounds were reportedly used as a site of detention and torture (water cure). Following liberation in 1945, a thanksgiving Mass was celebrated in the church patio.

On August 8, 1945, the Holy Cross Academy was founded as the first Catholic school in the town, utilizing the Convent “Gratis et Amore” as its first building. In 1960, the old convent was repurposed as a house of prayer for the Cursillo de Christianidad movement.

The parish has since played a significant role in the religious and cultural history of Pampanga and the wider development of Filipino Christianity. In the wake of the reforms of the Second Vatican Council, particularly the introduction of vernacular liturgy, Fr. Venancio Samson, a native of the town, translated the Latin Bible and Roman Missal into Kapampangan, among the earliest local language translations to receive ecclesiastical approval.

Most Rev. Fr. Paciano Aniceto, a native of the town, was ordained bishop by Pope John Paul II on May 27, 1979, at Saint Peter’s Basilica. He later served as Auxiliary Bishop of the Archdiocese of Tuguegarao and became the first Filipino bishop of the Diocese of Iba, Zambales. In 1989, he was appointed Archbishop of San Fernando, Pampanga, becoming the first Kapampangan to hold the office.

The Santa Ana Parish is notable for housing a sacred relic attributed to Saint Anne. A relic certificate issued in Rome on February 22, 1796, under the authority of Franciscus Xaverius Cristiani, attests to the authenticity of several relics, including the ex ossibus (from the bones) of Saint Anne which was given to the parish.

In 2013, the National Historical Commission of the Philippines installed an official marker recognizing the church as part of the nation’s cultural and historical heritage. During the Extraordinary Jubilee of Mercy and 2025 Jubilee, the Santa Ana Church was one of the Jubilee churches of Pampanga.

== Gallery ==
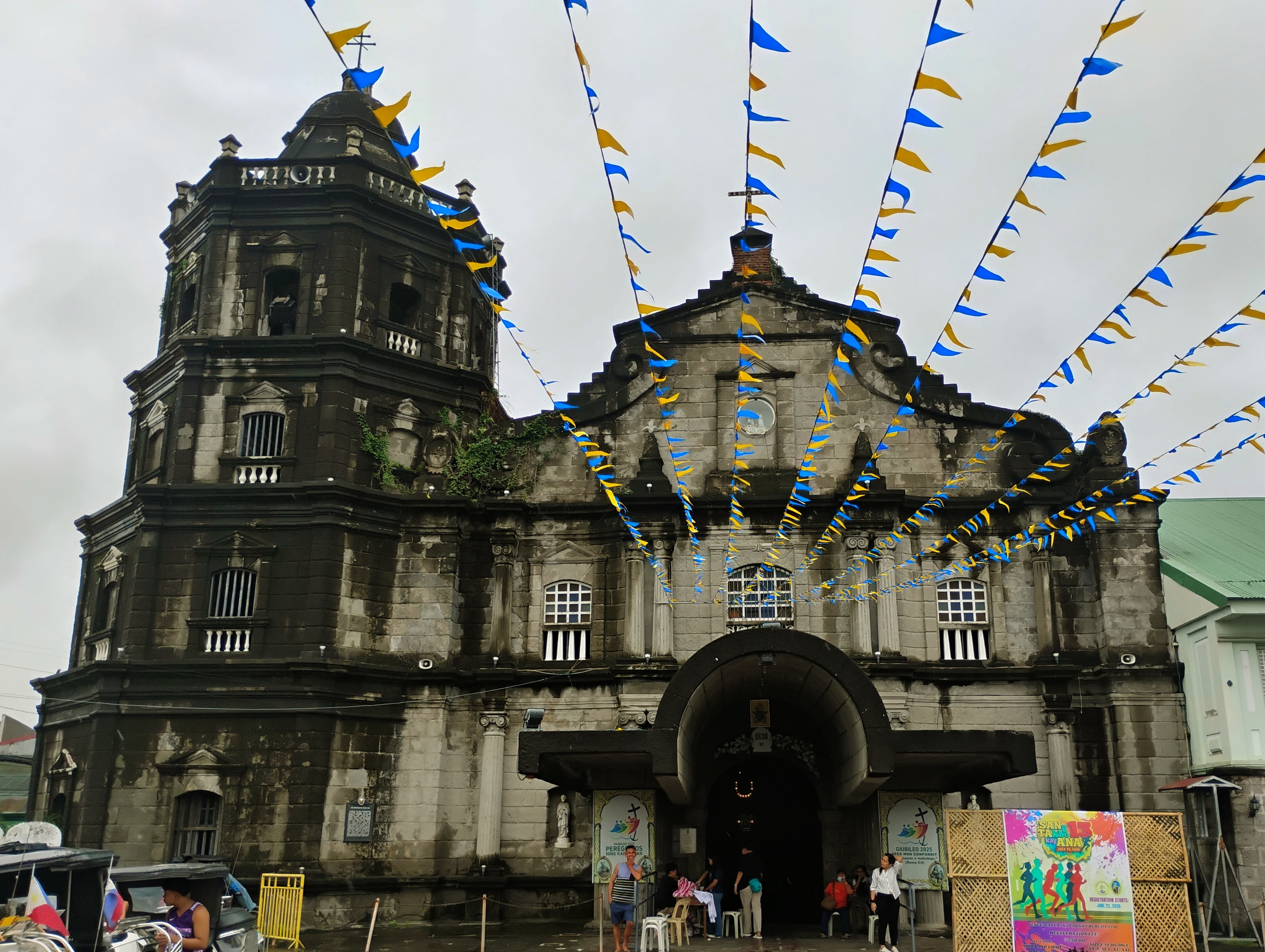
Facade in 2025

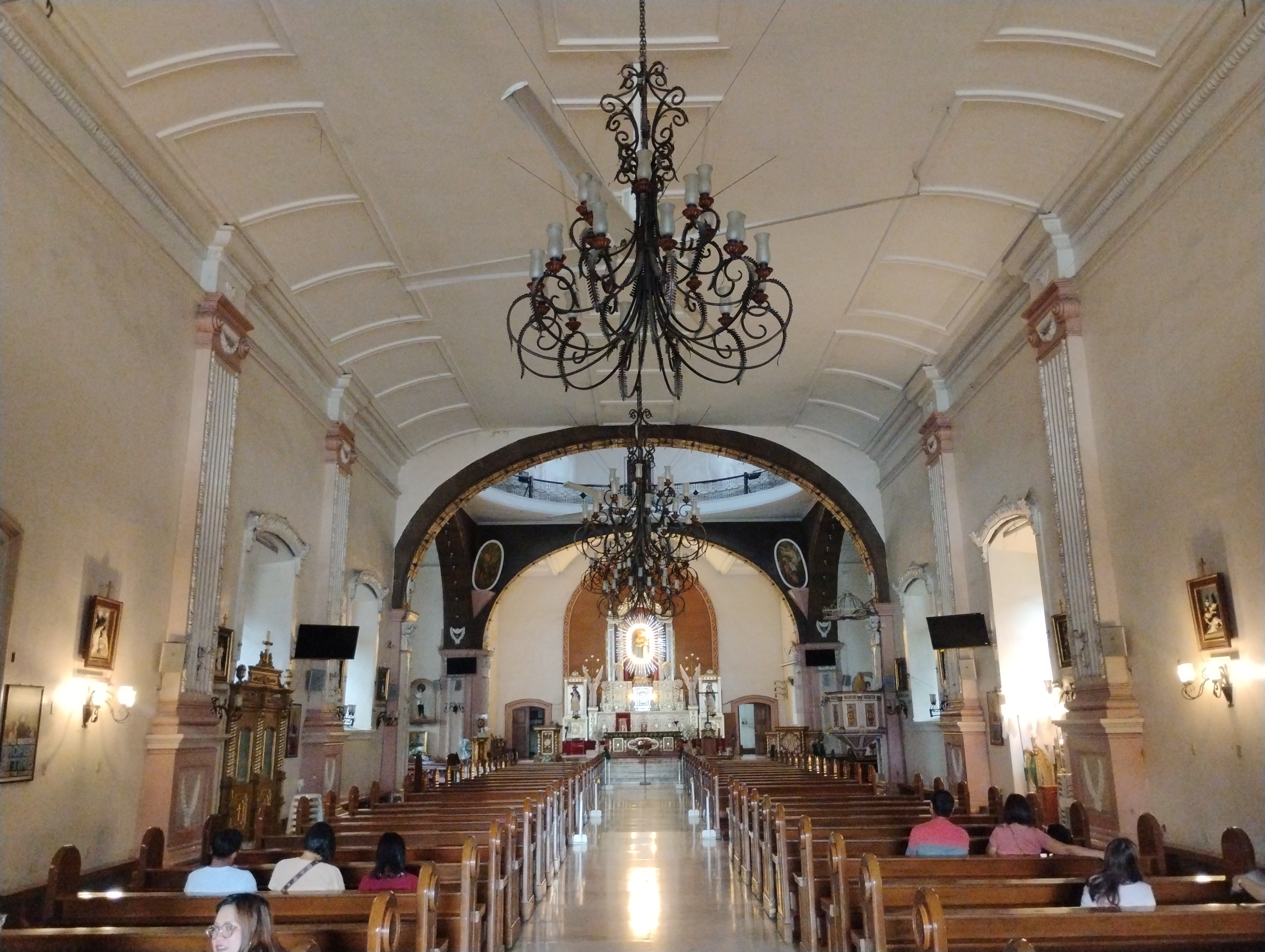
Church nave in 2025

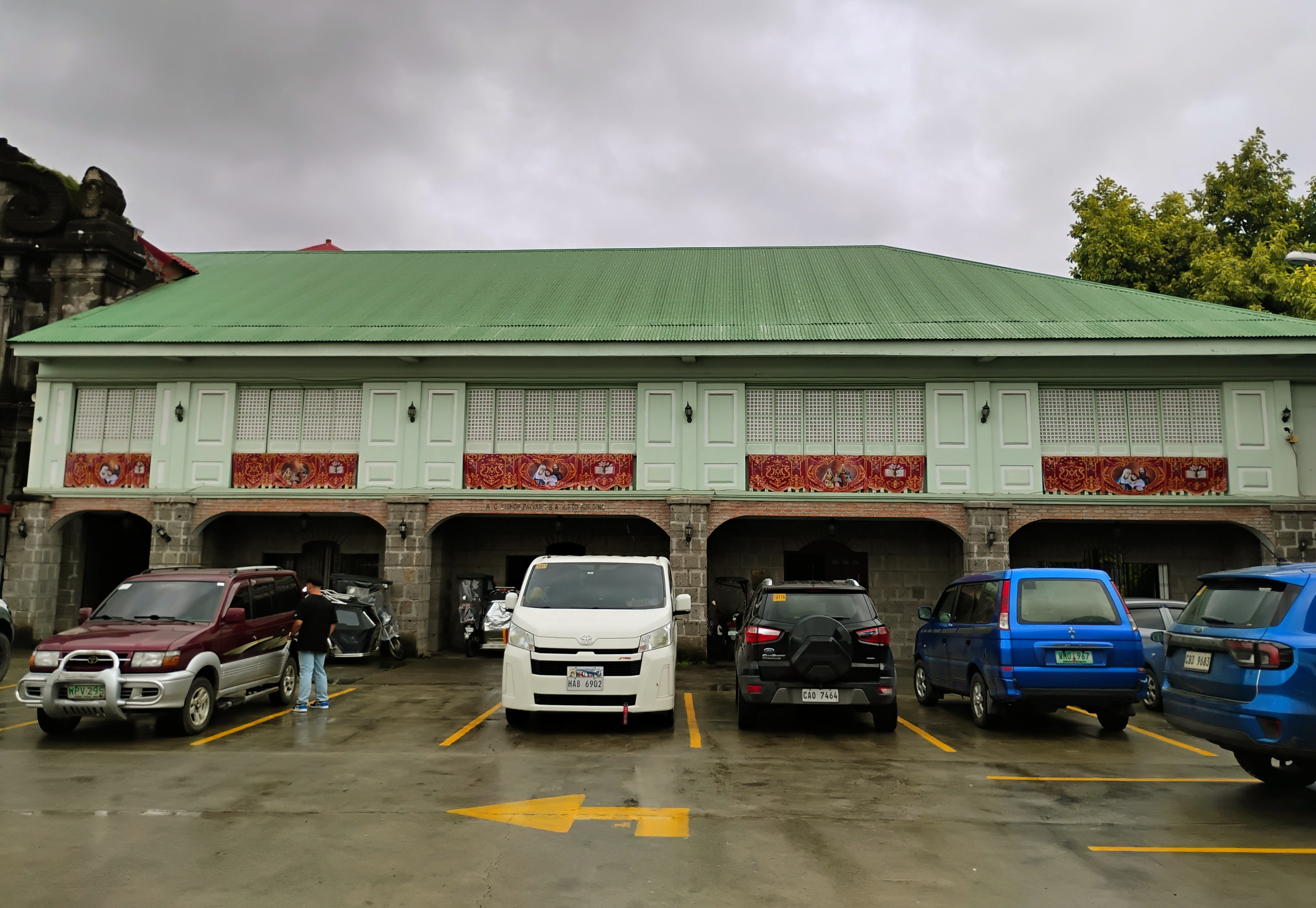
Convent building

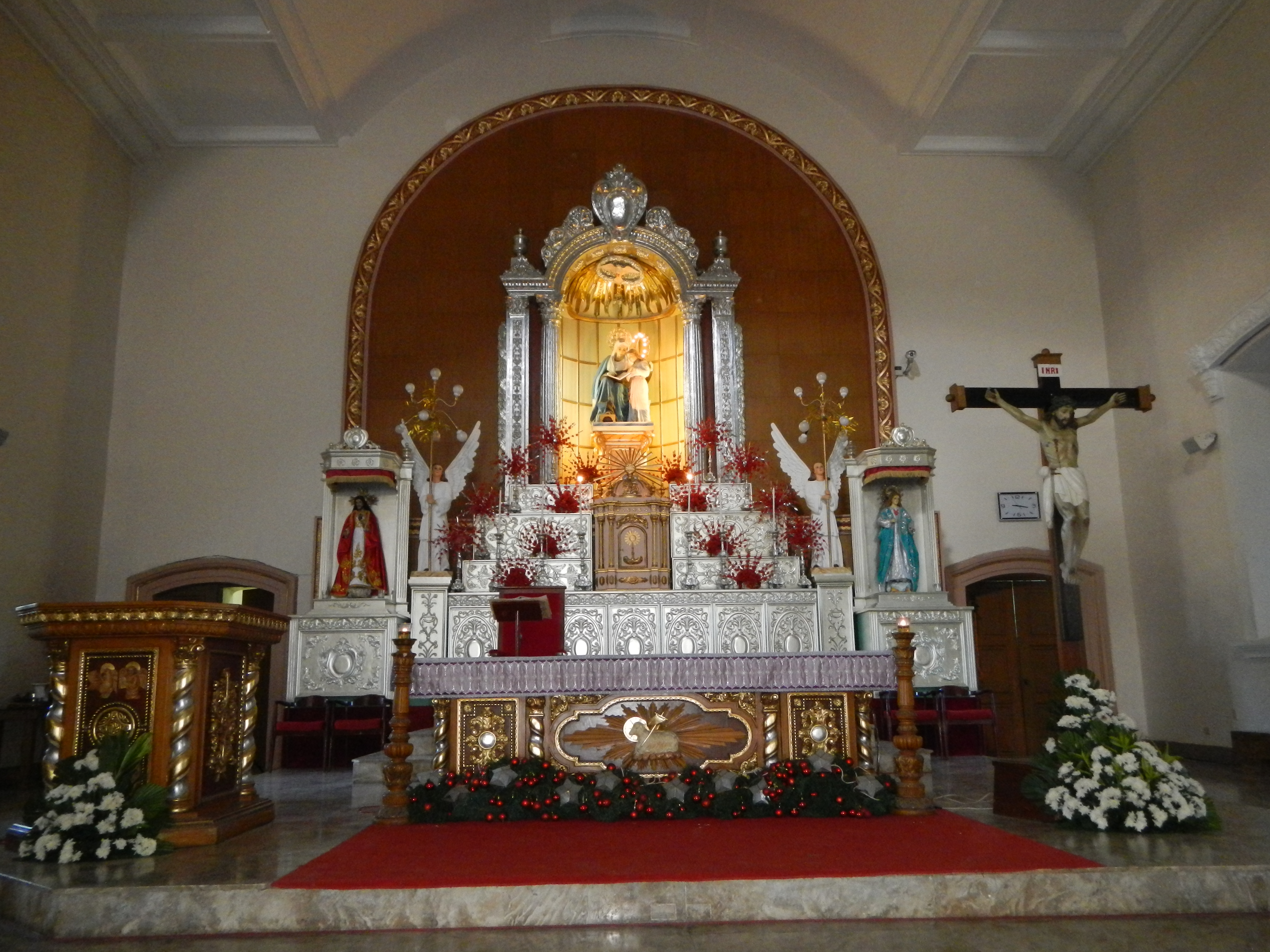
Main altar

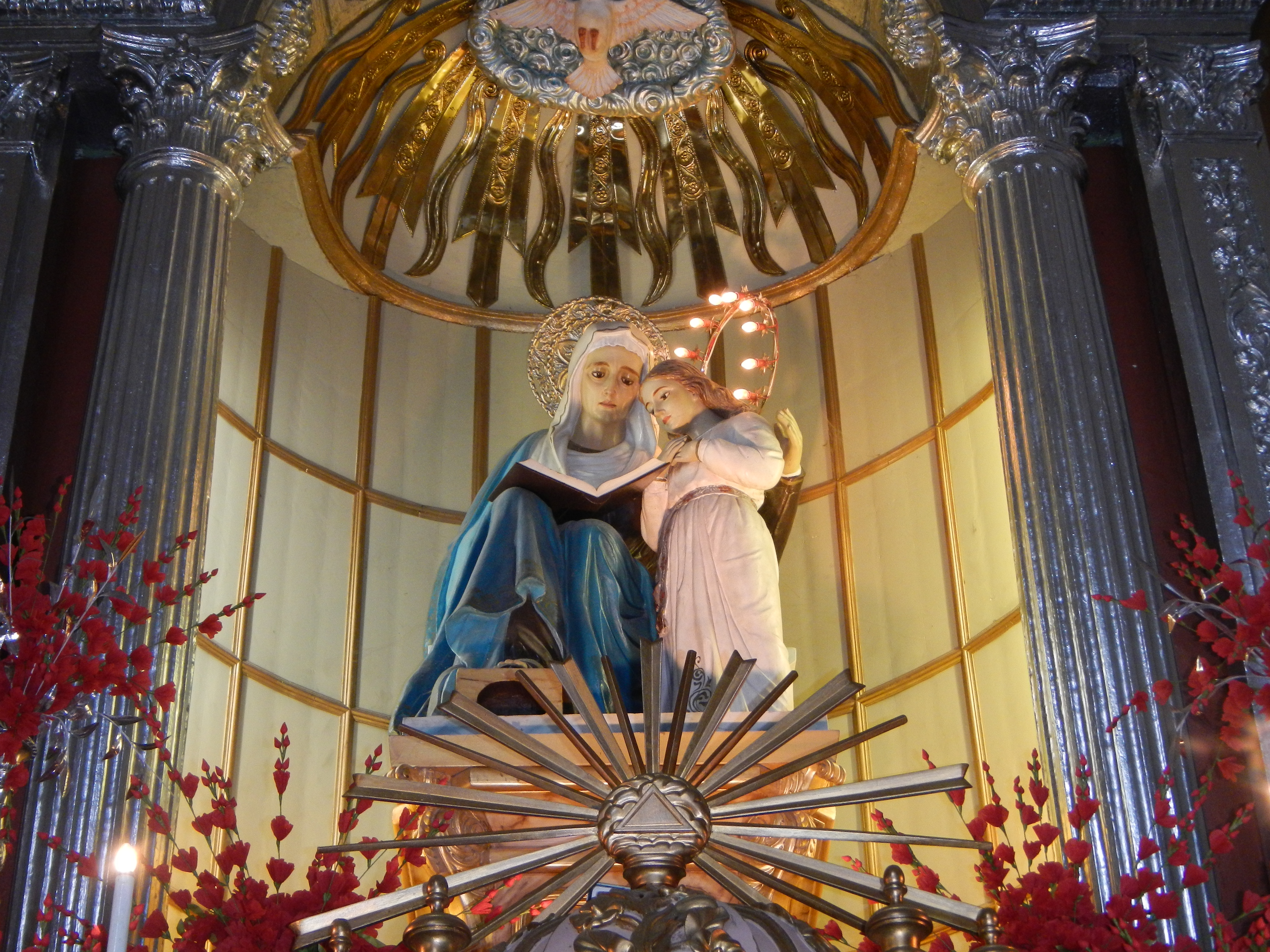
Image of Saint Anne in the main altar

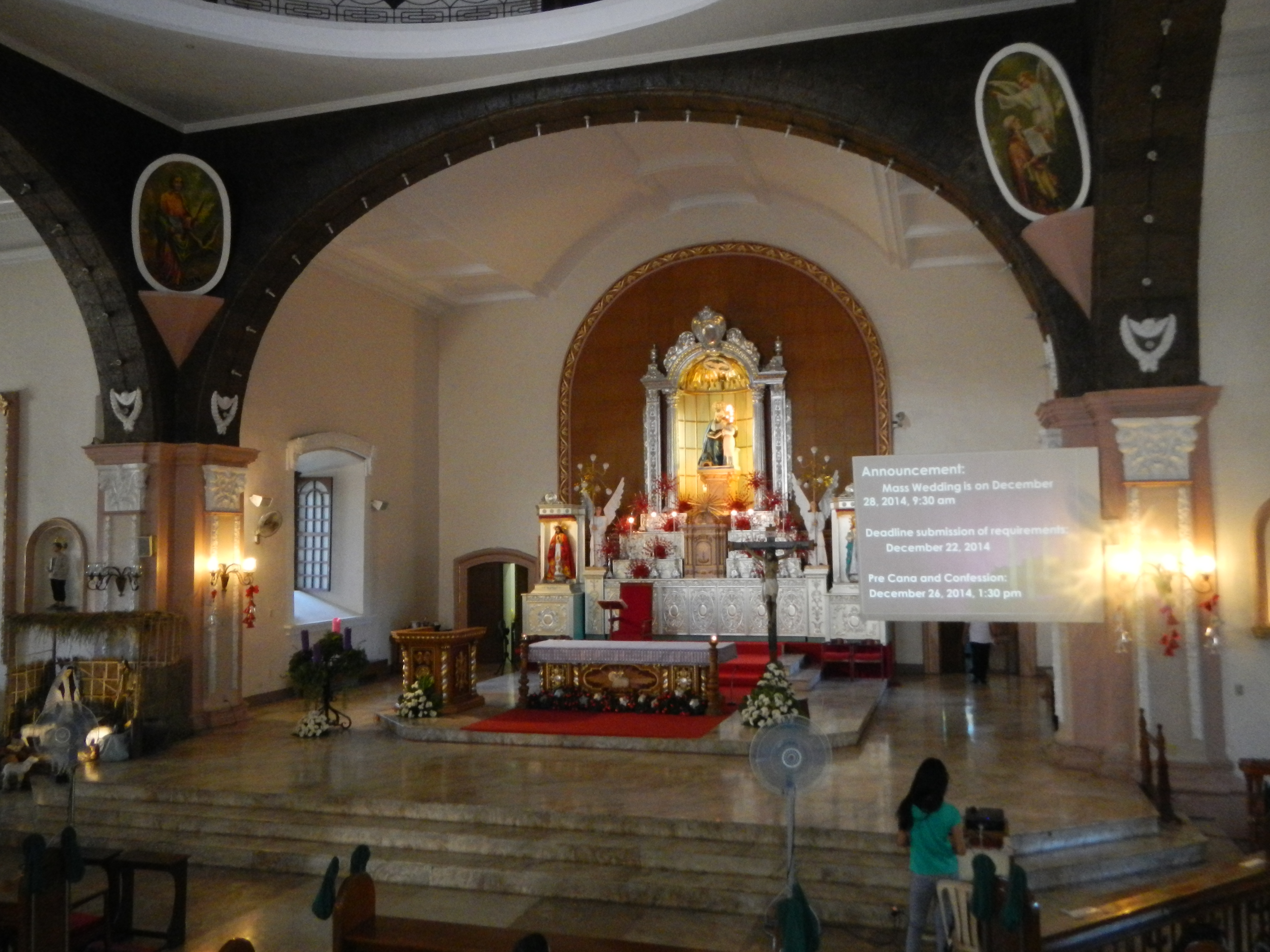
Interior of the altar

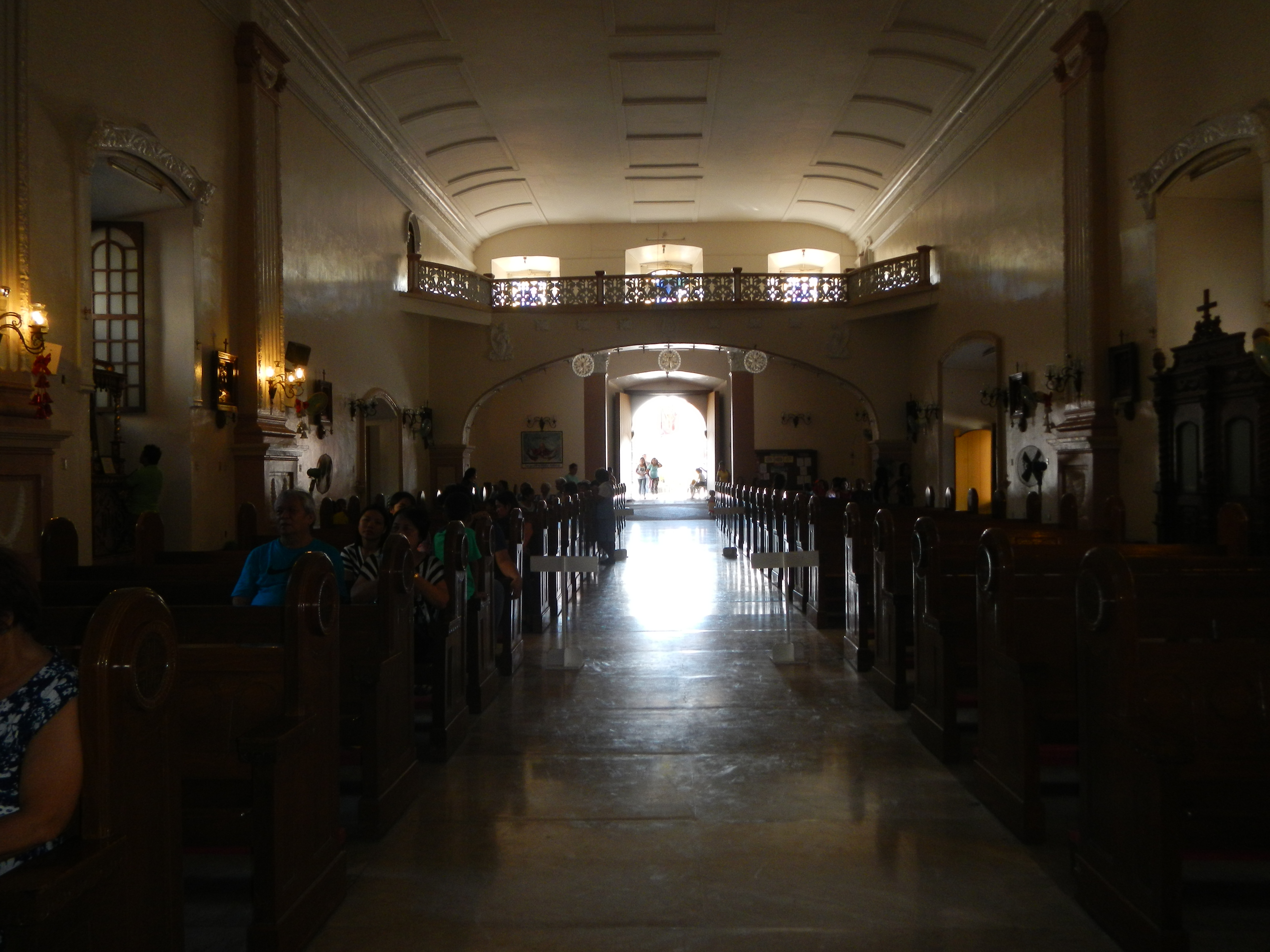
Interior of the nave

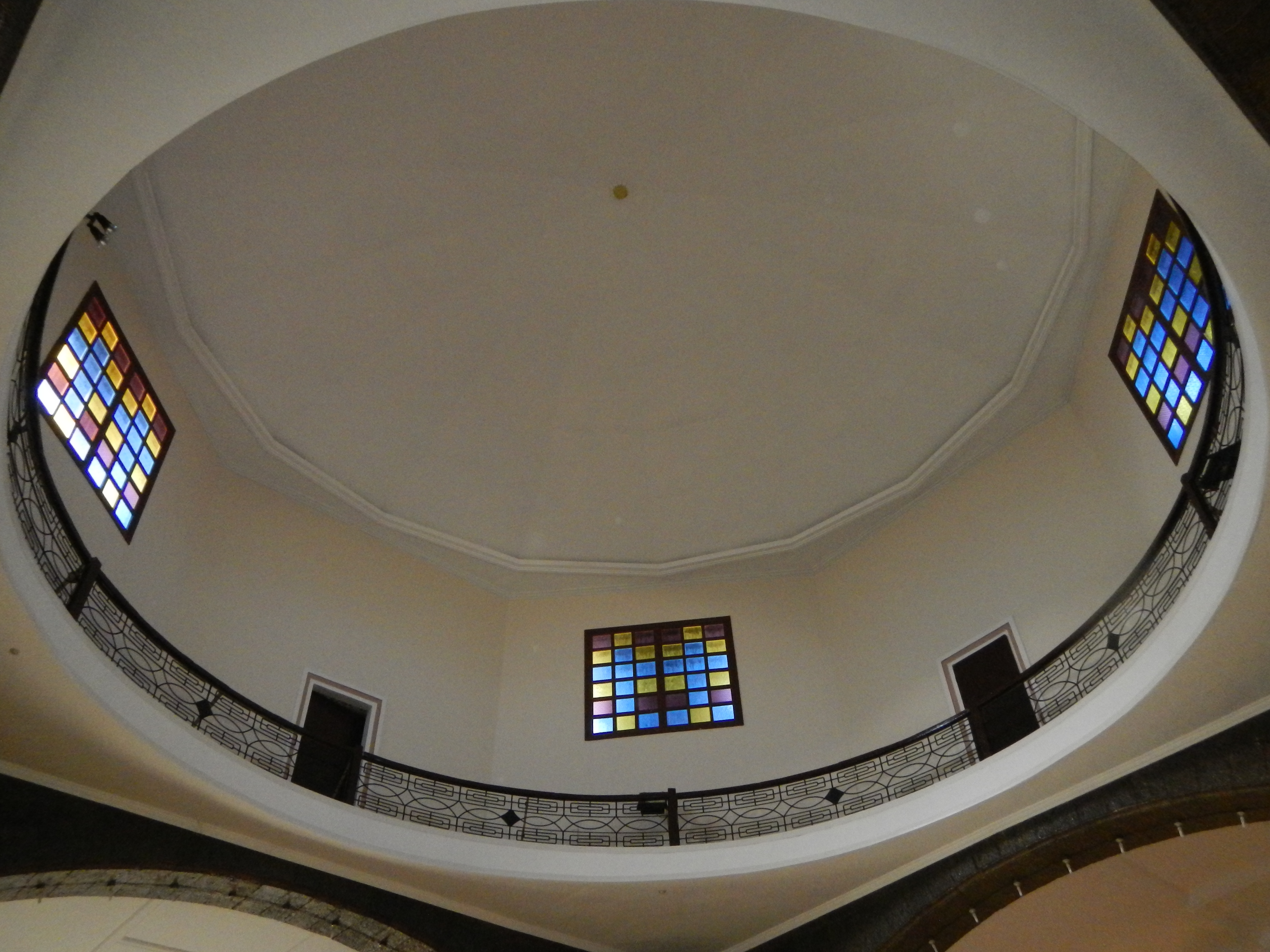
Dome interior

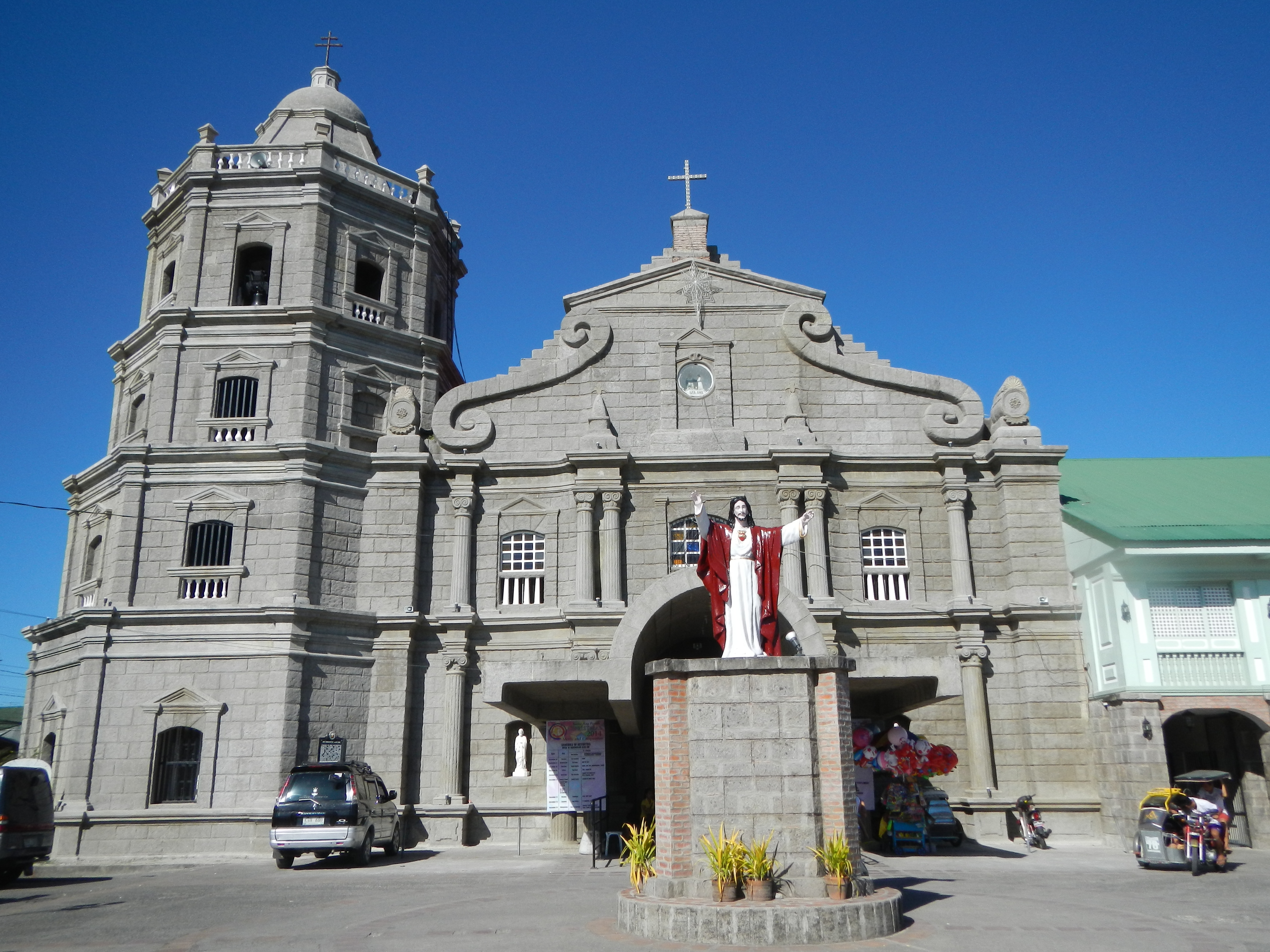
Newly restorated facade in 2014

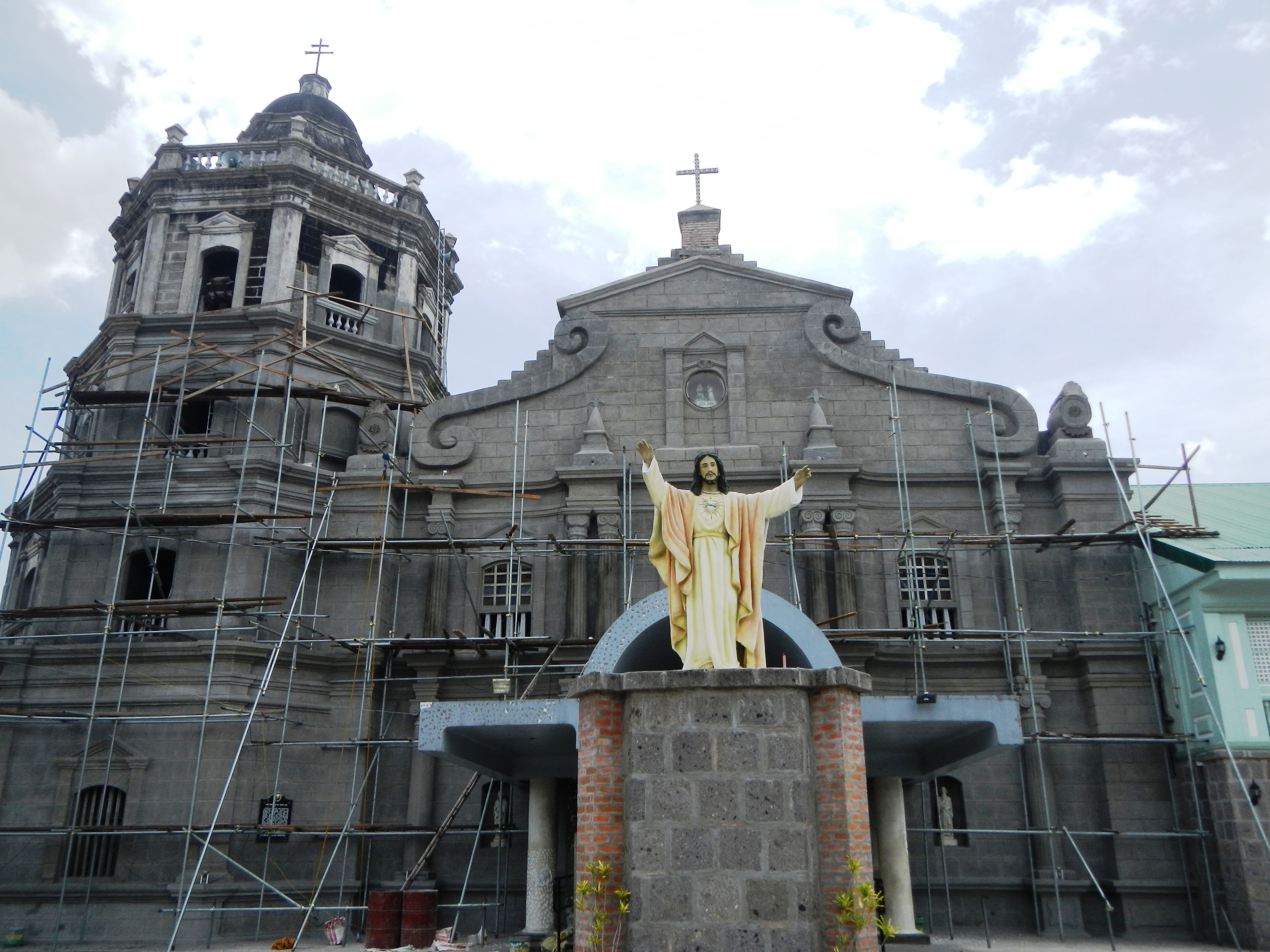
Facade during restoration and renovation

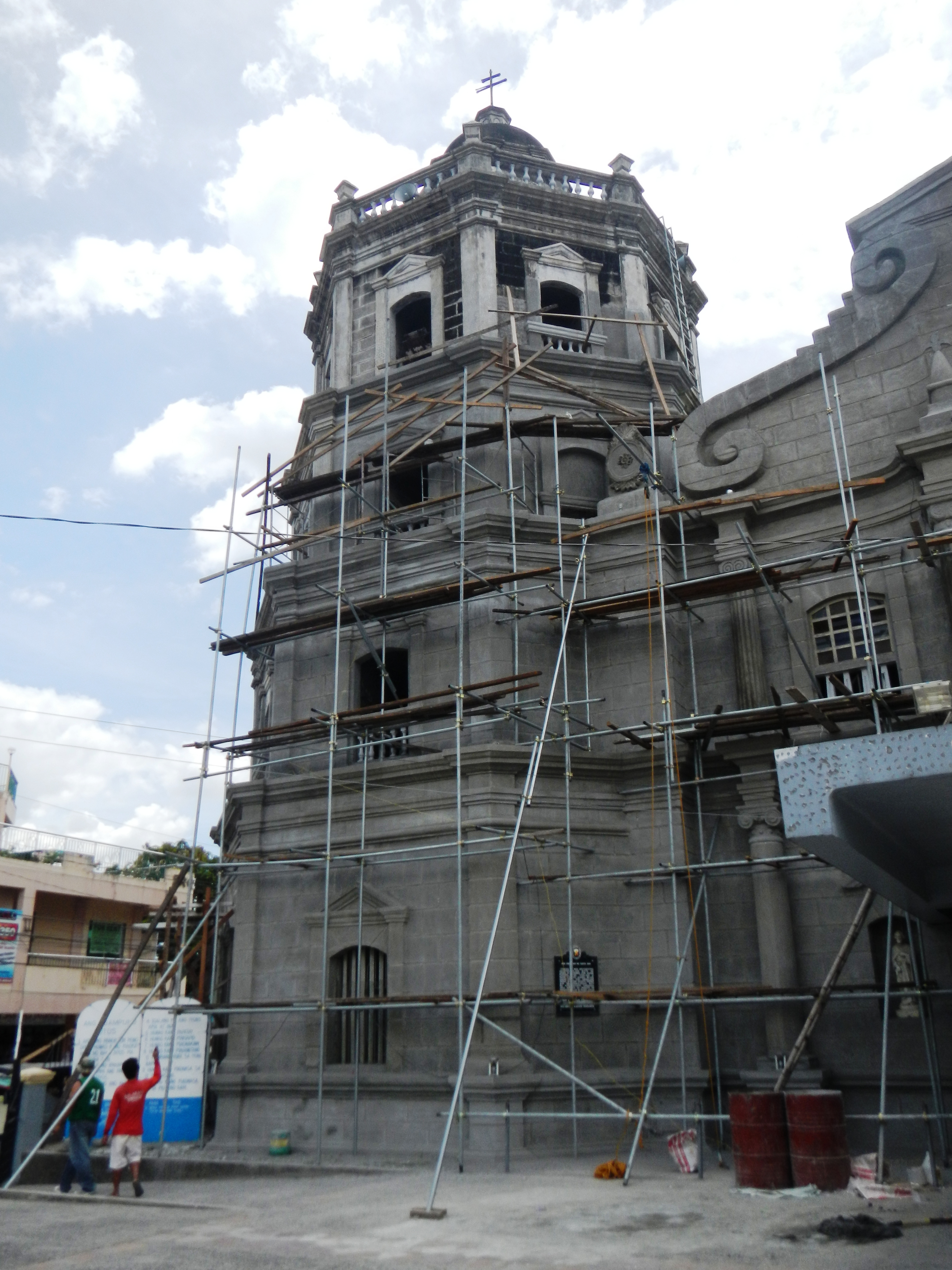
Belfry during renovation and restoration

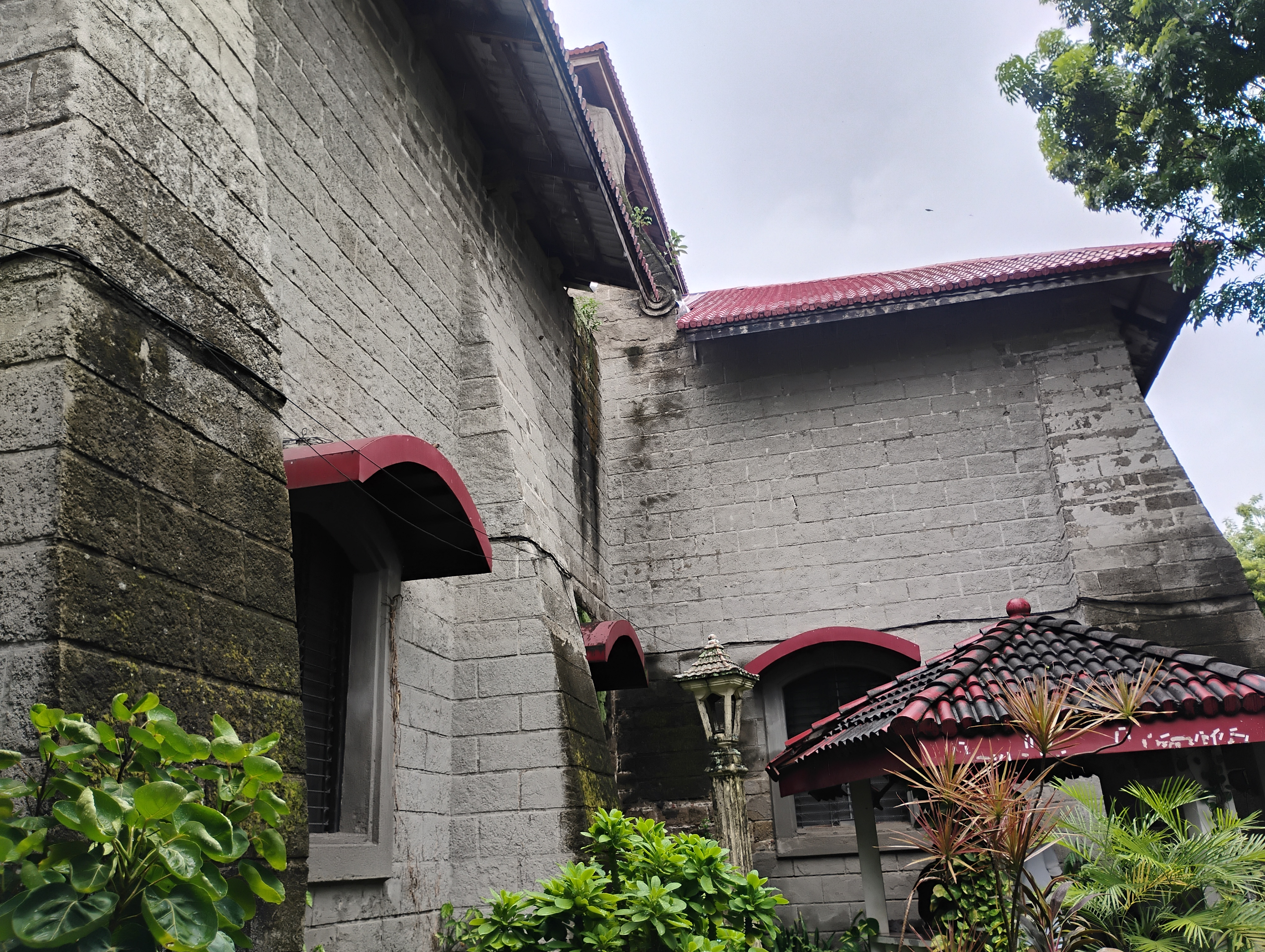
Side exterior

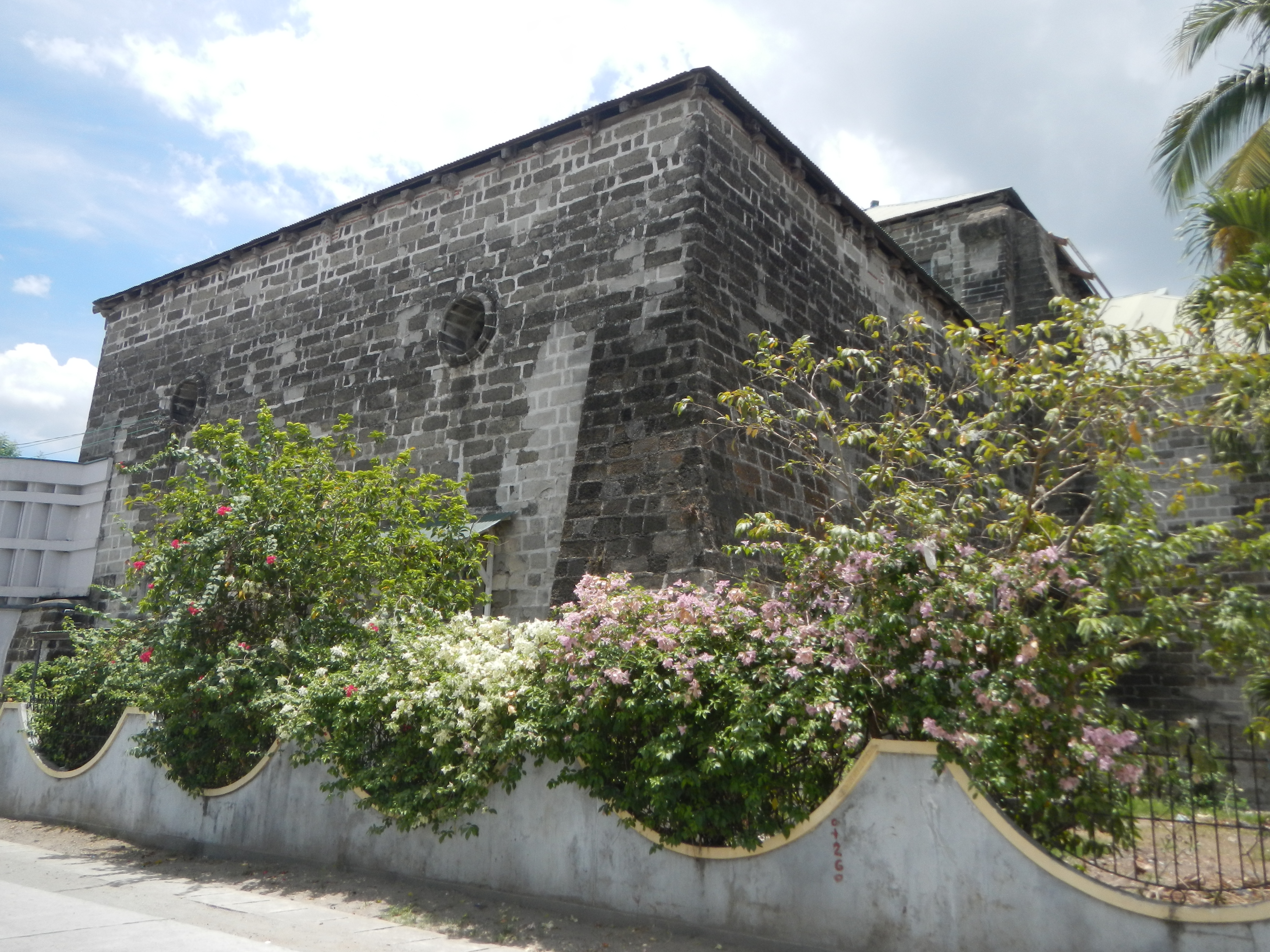
Back exterior

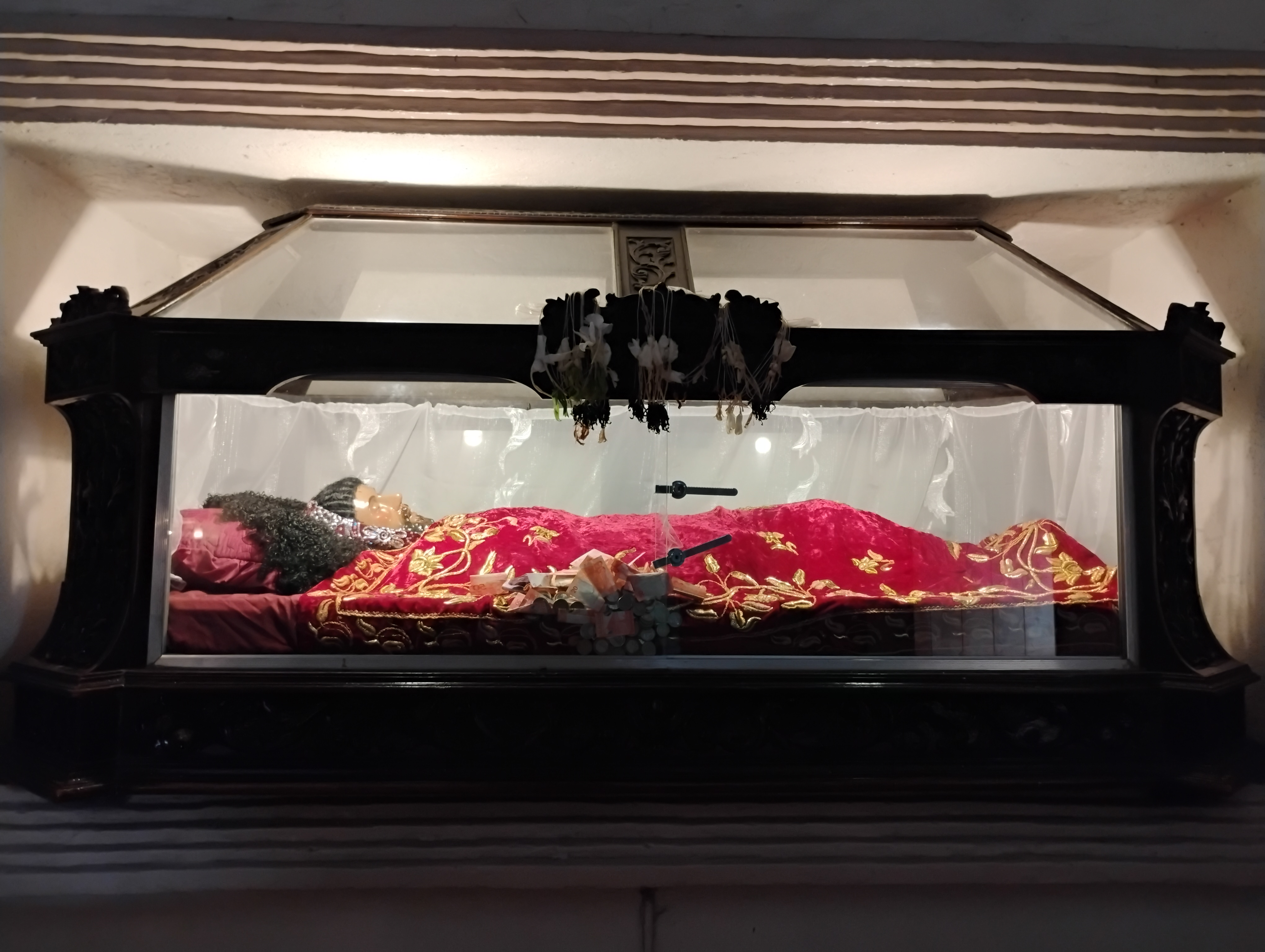
Santo Entierro

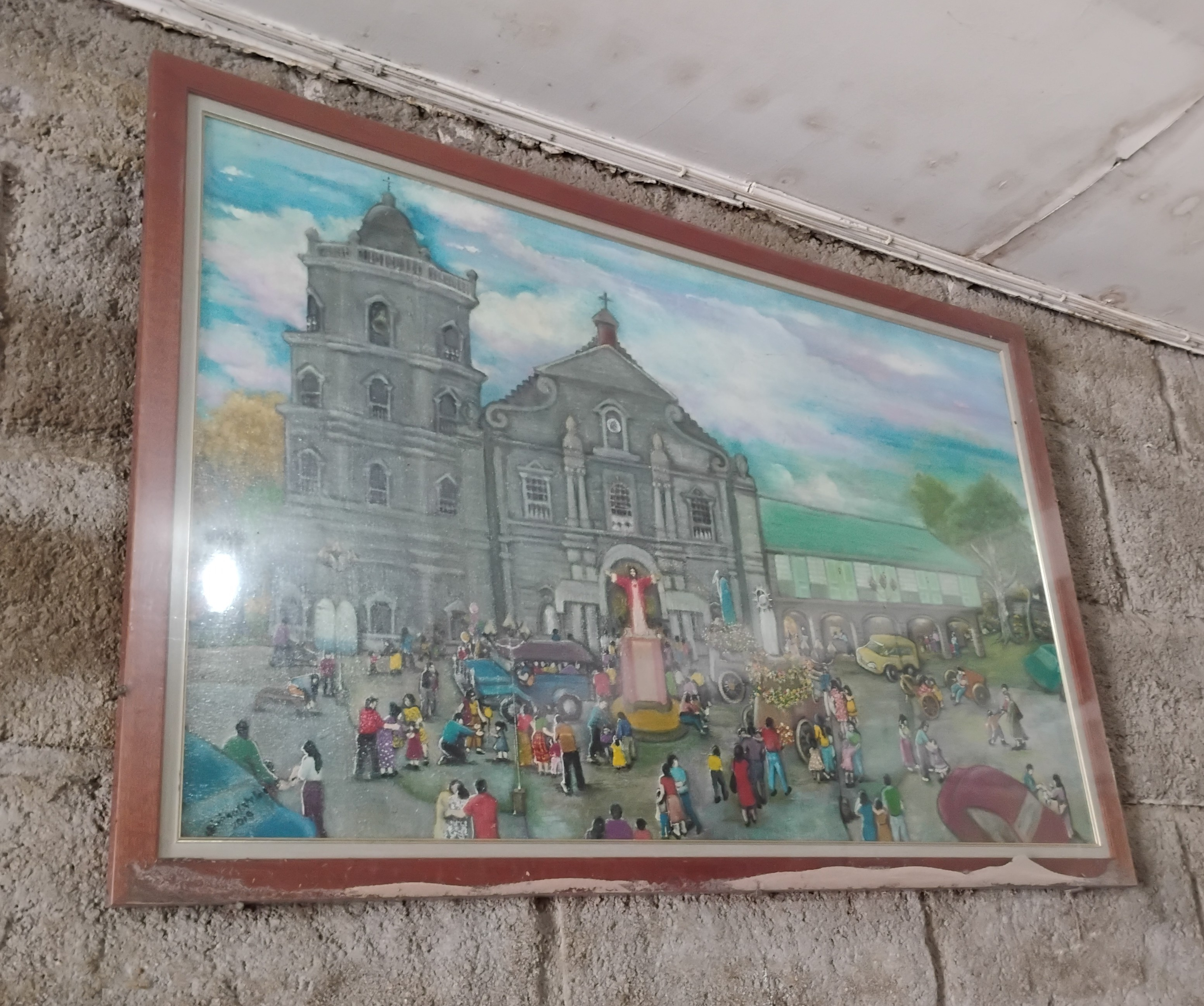
Painting of the church

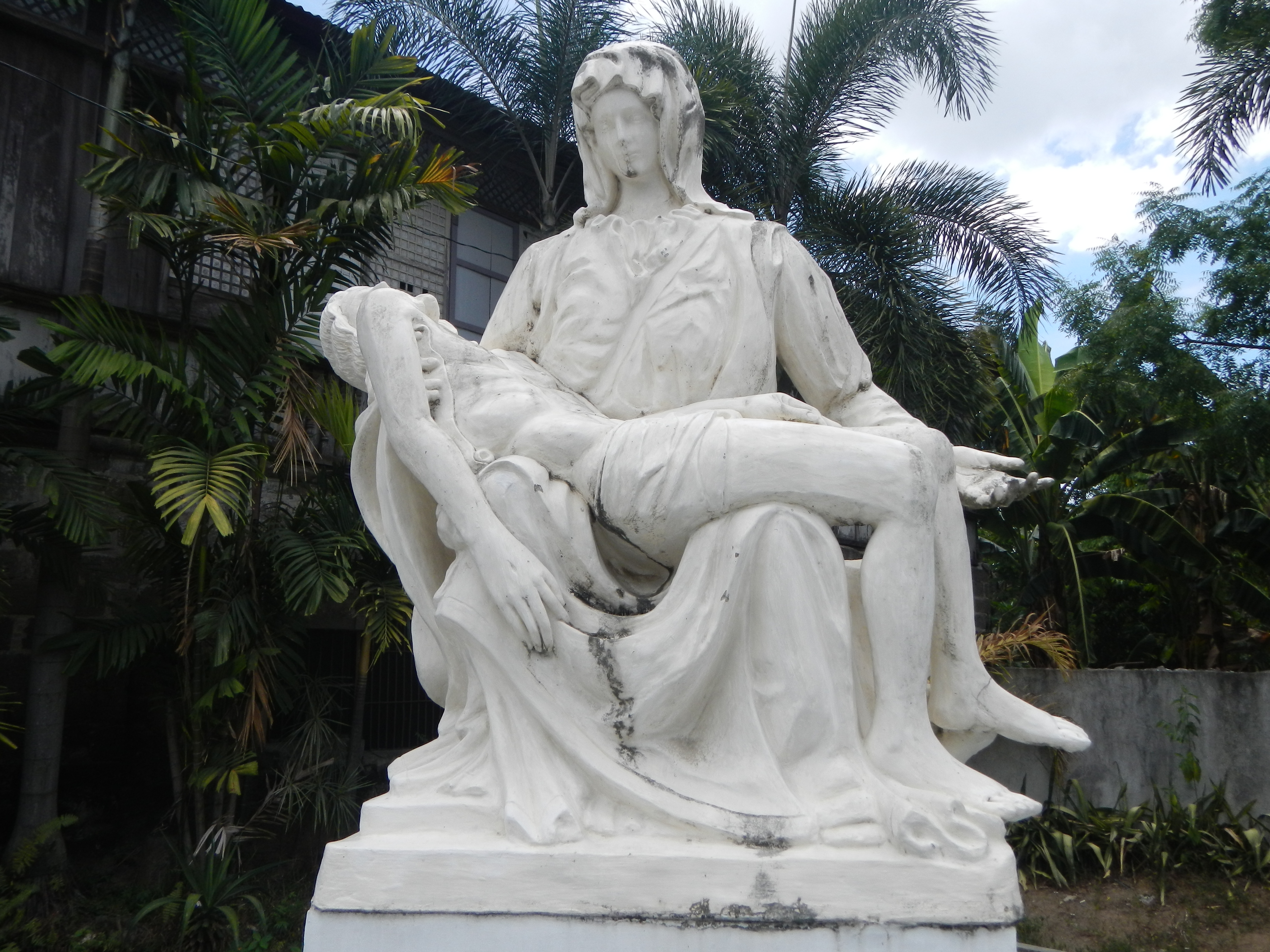
Pieta

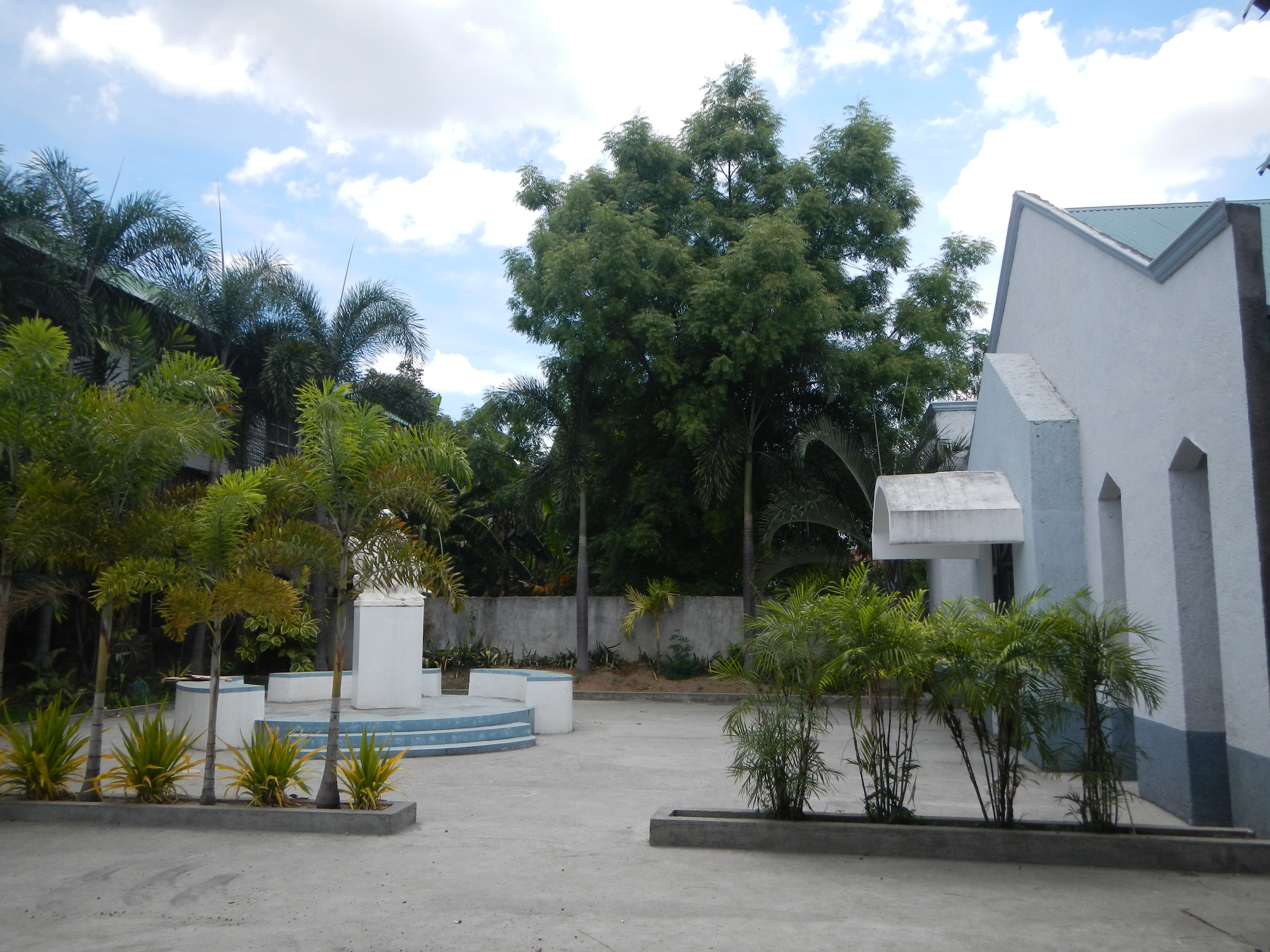
Mortuary chapel
