= Santa Ana, Pampanga =

Municipality in Pampanga, Philippines

Santa Ana
- Municipality
- Municipality of Santa Ana
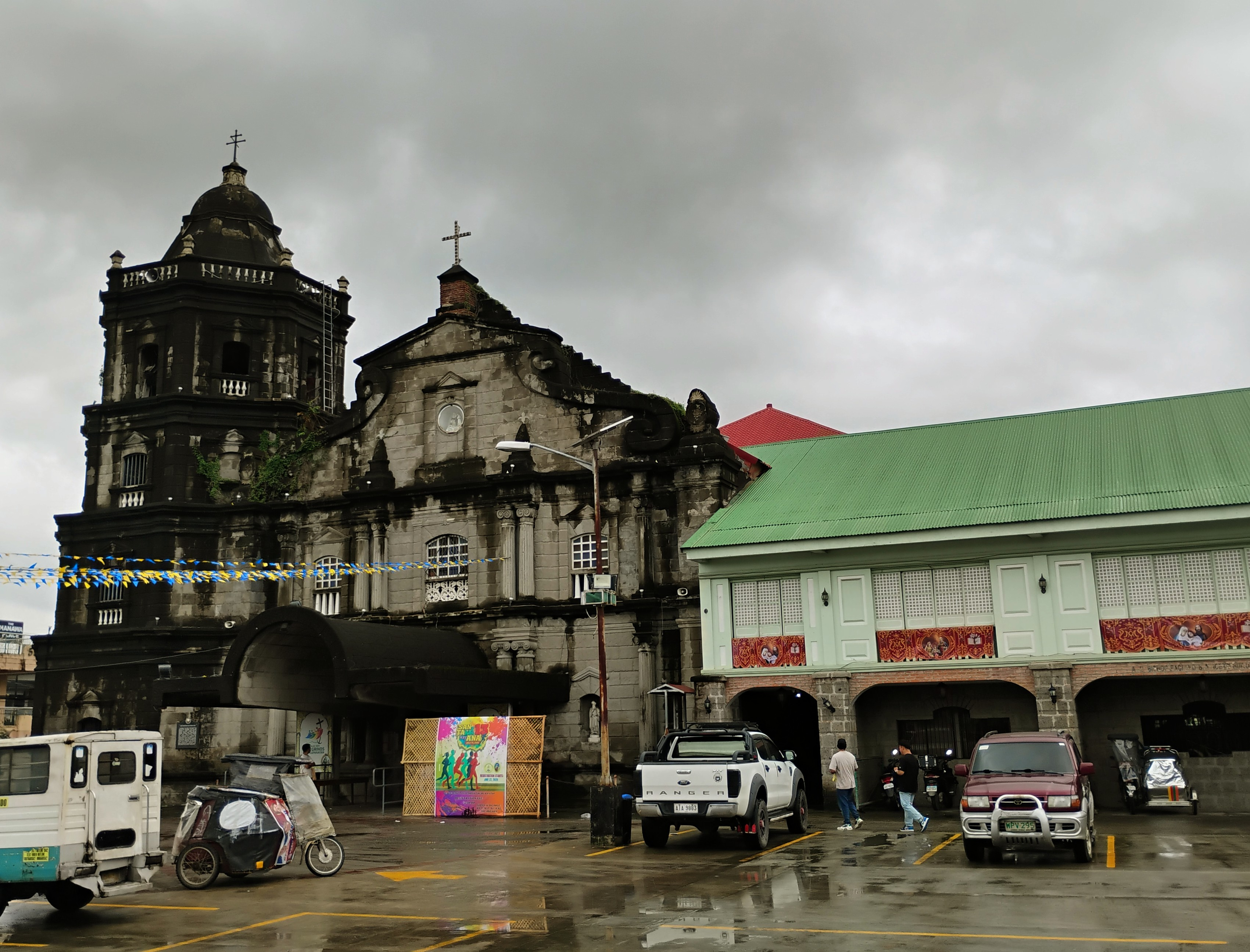
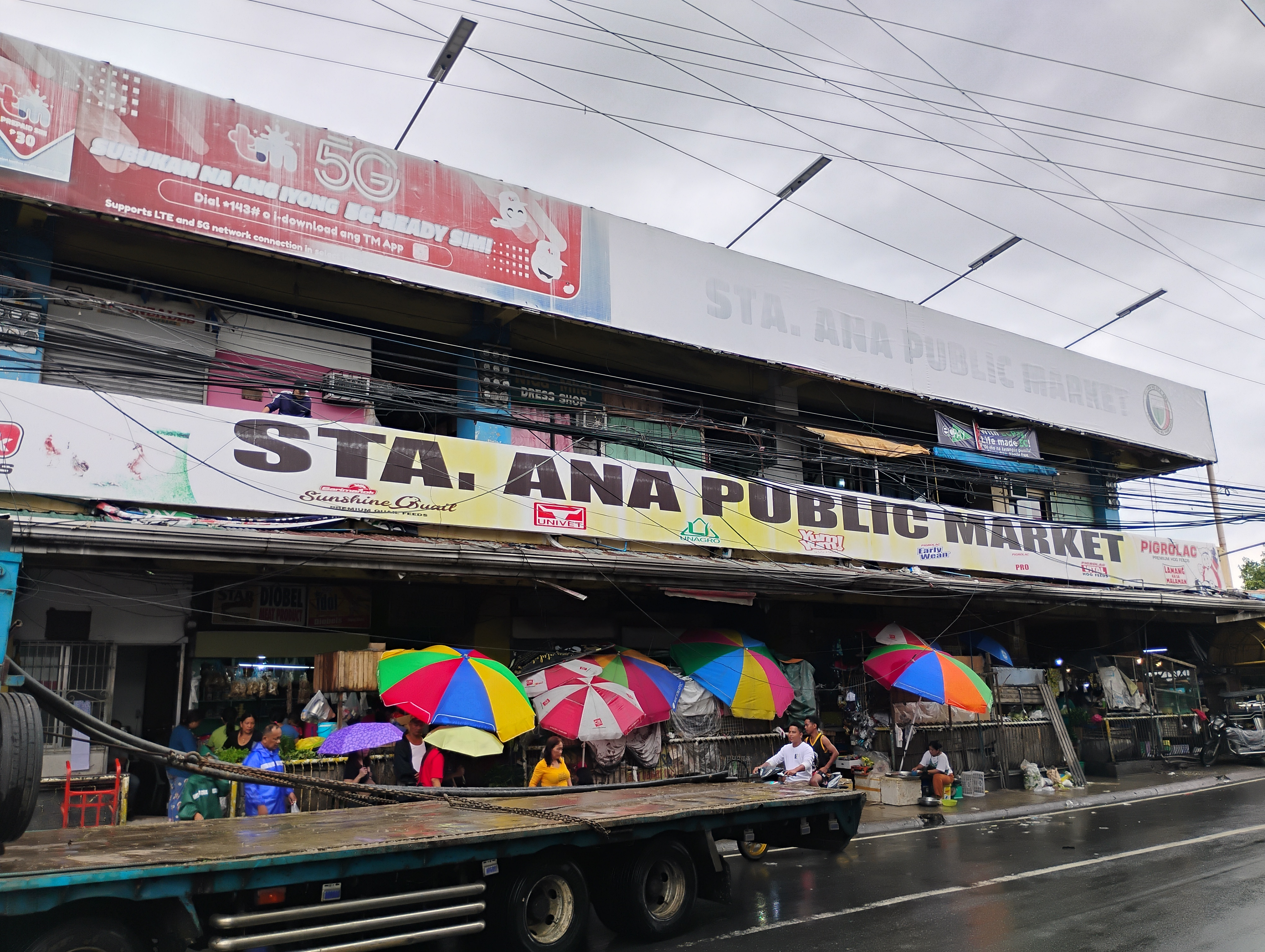
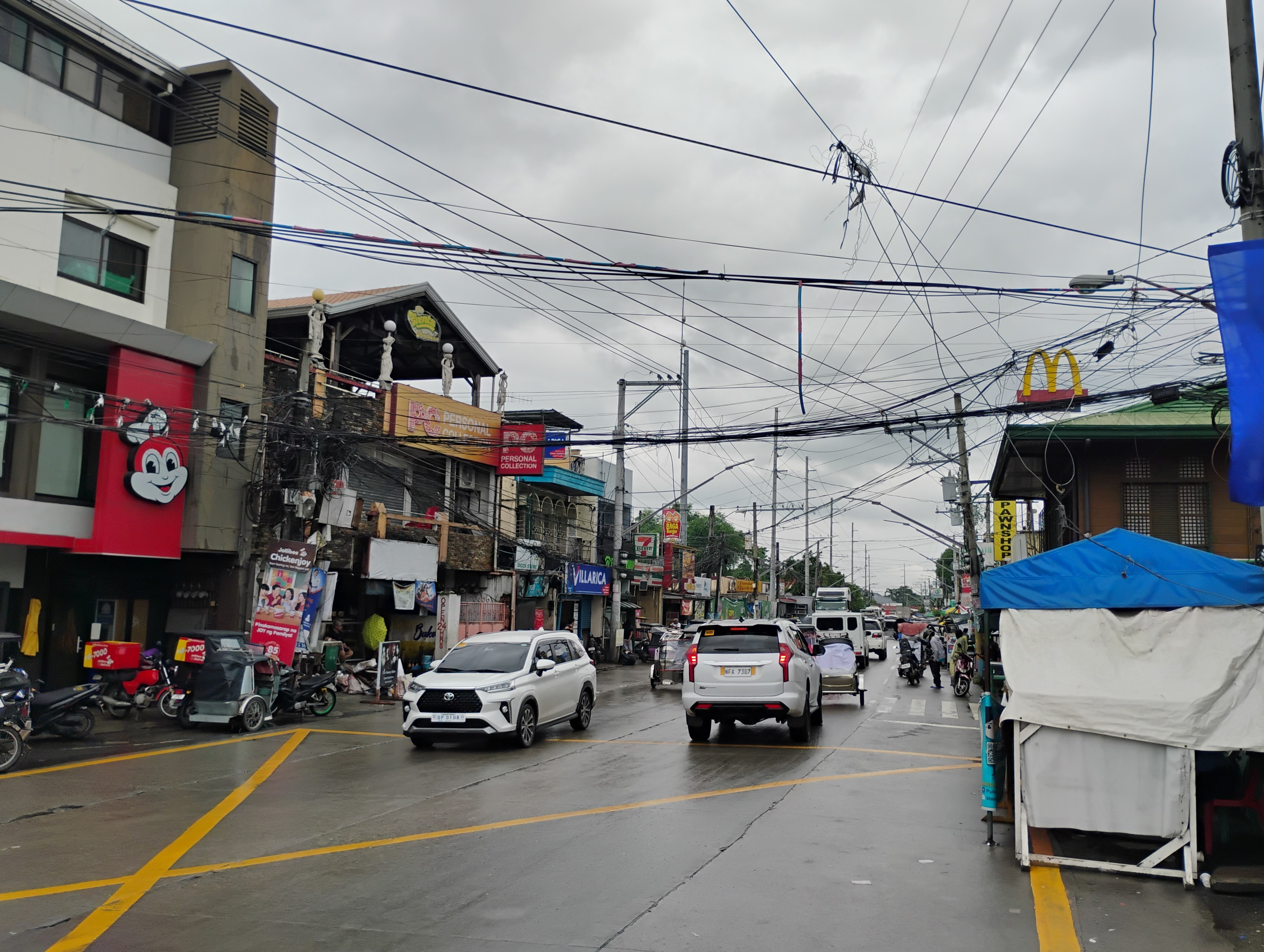
- Santa Ana Church Santa Ana Public Market Jose Abad Santos Avenue in Santa Ana

- Seal
- Nickname: Balen Pimpin
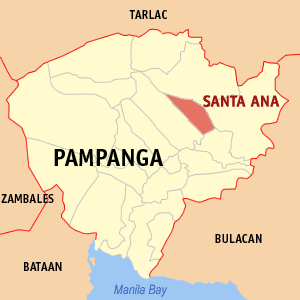
- Map of Pampanga with Santa Ana highlighted
- Interactive map of Santa Ana
- Location within the Philippines
- Coordinates: 15°05′38″N 120°46′05″E
- Country: Philippines
- Region: Central Luzon
- Province: Pampanga
- District: 3rd district
- Founded: Founded 1598 as Pimpin Reinstated January 1, 1913
- Named for: Saint Anne
- Barangays: 14 (see Barangays)

Government
  - Type: Sangguniang Bayan
  - Mayor: Engr. Ferdinand P. Labung
  - Vice Mayor: Rhodora C. Nacpil
  - Representative: Alyssa Michaela M. Gonzales
  - Municipal Council: Members: Rommel Conception; Jerome Ian S. Gaddi; Reinhart Guevarra; Arthur Diaz; Cir Anthony Alfonso; Louis Gio V. Mesina; Myriam "Jingle" M. Lansangan; Vergel T. Mallari
  - Electorate: 36,297 voters (2025)

Area
  - Total: 39.84 km^{2} (15.38 sq mi)
- Elevation: 9.0 m (29.5 ft)
- Highest elevation: 33 m (108 ft)
- Lowest elevation: 1 m (3.3 ft)

Population (2024 census)
  - Total: 63,431
  - Density: 1,592/km^{2} (4,124/sq mi)
  - Households: 13,567

Economy
  - Income class: 1st municipal income class
  - Poverty incidence: 8.34% (2023)
  - Revenue: ₱ 225.9 million (2024)
  - Assets: ₱ 609.1 million (2024)
  - Expenditure: ₱ 196.8 million (2024)
  - Liabilities: ₱ 146.2 million (2024)

Service provider
  - Electricity: Pampanga 1 Electric Cooperative, Inc. (PELCO 1)
  - Water: BCBI Waterworks (Balibago Waterworks)
- Time zone: UTC+8 (PST)
- ZIP code: 2022
- PSGC: 0305419000
- IDD : area code: +63 (0)45
- Native languages: Kapampangan; Tagalog
- Website: https://santaanapampanga.online/

Santa Ana, officially the Municipality of Santa Ana (Kapampangan: Balen ning Santa Ana; Tagalog: Bayan ng Santa Ana), is a first class municipality in the province of Pampanga, Philippines. According to the 2024 census, it has a population of 63,431 people.

== History ==
Santa Ana was founded in 1598 as Pimpin and was restablished as a municipality on January 1, 1913. The town's Kapampangan nickname, Balen Pimpin, meant "laid aside" to refer to its small size, and it was named after Saint Anne by Spanish missionaries. In 1810, several of its barrios were transferred to the neighboring towns of Arayat, Mexico, and San Luis.

=== Before the 1970s ===
Before the 1970s, agriculture was the main livelihood of many families in Santa Ana. Farmers grew rice, sugarcane, fruits, and vegetables, which were traded with nearby municipalities such as Arayat, Mexico, and Candaba. The barangays of San Agustin, Santo Rosario, San Roque, and San Pablo were among the town's farming communities.

Santa Ana is known for its Majigangga, giant puppets that are paraded and danced through the streets around Christmas, a festival that began in the late 1960s.

== Geography ==
Santa Ana is bordered by Arayat and Magalang to the north; Candaba to the east; San Luis to the south; and Mexico to the west.

The town can be accessed by via Jose Abad Santos Avenue, Candaba-Santa Ana Road (Santa Lucia) and Magalang-Arayat-Santa Ana Road (San Pablo).

Santa Ana is 15 kilometres (9.3 mi) from the San Fernando, 81 kilometres (50 mi) from Manila, and 7 kilometres (4.3 mi) from Mexico.

=== Barangays ===
Santa Ana is politically subdivided into 14 barangays, as shown below. Each barangay consists of puroks and some have sitios.

- San Agustin (Sumpung)
- San Bartolome (Patayum)
- San Isidro (Quenabuan)
- San Joaquin (Poblacion, Canukil)
- San Jose (Catmun)
- San Juan (Tinajeru)
- San Nicolas (Sepung Ilug)
- San Pablo (Darabulbul)
- San Pedro (Calumpang)
- San Roque (Tuclung)
- Santa Lucia (Calinan)
- Santa Maria (Balen Bayu)
- Santiago (Barrio Libutad)
- Santo Rosario (Pagbatuan)

=== Climate ===
Climate data for Santa Ana, Pampanga
Month	Jan	Feb	Mar	Apr	May	Jun	Jul	Aug	Sep	Oct	Nov	Dec	Year
Mean daily maximum °C (°F)	28 (82)	29 (84)	31 (88)	33 (91)	32 (90)	31 (88)	30 (86)	29 (84)	29 (84)	30 (86)	30 (86)	28 (82)	30 (86)
Mean daily minimum °C (°F)	20 (68)	20 (68)	21 (70)	23 (73)	24 (75)	24 (75)	24 (75)	24 (75)	24 (75)	23 (73)	22 (72)	21 (70)	23 (72)
Average precipitation mm (inches)	6 (0.2)	4 (0.2)	6 (0.2)	17 (0.7)	82 (3.2)	122 (4.8)	151 (5.9)	123 (4.8)	124 (4.9)	99 (3.9)	37 (1.5)	21 (0.8)	792 (31.1)
Average rainy days	3.3	2.5	3.6	6.6	17.7	22.2	25.2	23.7	23.2	17.9	9.2	5.2	160.3
Source: Meteoblue

== Demographics ==
Population census of Santa Ana

Year	Pop.	±% p.a.
1903	5,532	—
1918	6,528	+1.11%
1939	8,183	+1.08%
1948	10,491	+2.80%
1960	14,121	+2.51%
1970	19,402	+3.22%
1975	22,595	+3.10%
1980	25,361	+2.34%

Year	Pop.	±% p.a.
1990	32,540	+2.52%
1995	37,975	+2.94%
2000	42,990	+2.69%
2007	49,756	+2.04%
2010	52,001	+1.62%
2015	55,178	+1.14%
2020	61,537	+2.32%
2024	63,431	+0.73%

Source: Philippine Statistics Authority

In the 2024 census, the population of Santa Ana was 63,431 people, with a density of 1,600 inhabitants per square kilometre or 4,100 inhabitants per square mile.

== Economy ==
Poverty incidence of Santa Ana (%)

Source: Philippine Statistics Authority

== Government ==
=== Local government ===
The Municipal Government is divided into three branches: executive, legislative and judiciary. The Judicial Branch is administered solely by the Supreme Court of the Philippines. The executive branch is composed of the mayor and the barangay captain for the barangays. The legislative branch is composed of the Sangguniang Bayan (town assembly), Sangguniang Barangay (barangay council), and the Sangguniang Kabataan for the youth sector.

== Education ==
The Santa Ana Schools District Office governs all educational institutions within the municipality. It oversees the management and operations of all private and public, from primary to secondary schools.

=== Primary and elementary schools ===
- Adelle Grace Montesorri School
- Fulgencio Matias Elementary School
- San Juan/San Pedro Elementary School
- San Agustin Elementary School
- Sto Rosario Elementary School
- San Roque Elementary School
- San Pablo Elementary School
- Santiago Elementary School
- San Isidro Elementary School
- San Nicolas Elementary School
- Sta Lucia Elementary School
- Sta Maria Elementary School
- Sta. Ana Elementary School

=== Public secondary schools ===
- San Isidro High School
- Sta. Ana Central High School
- Sta. Ana National High School
- Telesforo and Natividad Alfonso High School

=== Higher educational institutions ===
- Holy Cross College Pampanga
- Saint Mary's Angels College of Pampanga

== Notable personalities ==
- Michael Miranda, is a Filipino professional basketball player currently playing in the Philippine Basketball Association.
- Oca Rodriguez, is a Filipino politician, a former Member of the Philippine House of Representatives from Pampanga's 3rd district.
- Paciano Aniceto, Archbishop-Emeritus of Archdiocese of San Fernando from 1989 to 2014.
- Larry Muyang, is a Filipino professional basketball player currently playing in MPBL.
- Venancio Samson, is a Roman Catholic Priest, Kapampangan lexicologist, translated the Latin Bible and Roman Missal into Kapampangan language, among the earliest local language translations to receive ecclesiastical approval.

== Gallery ==
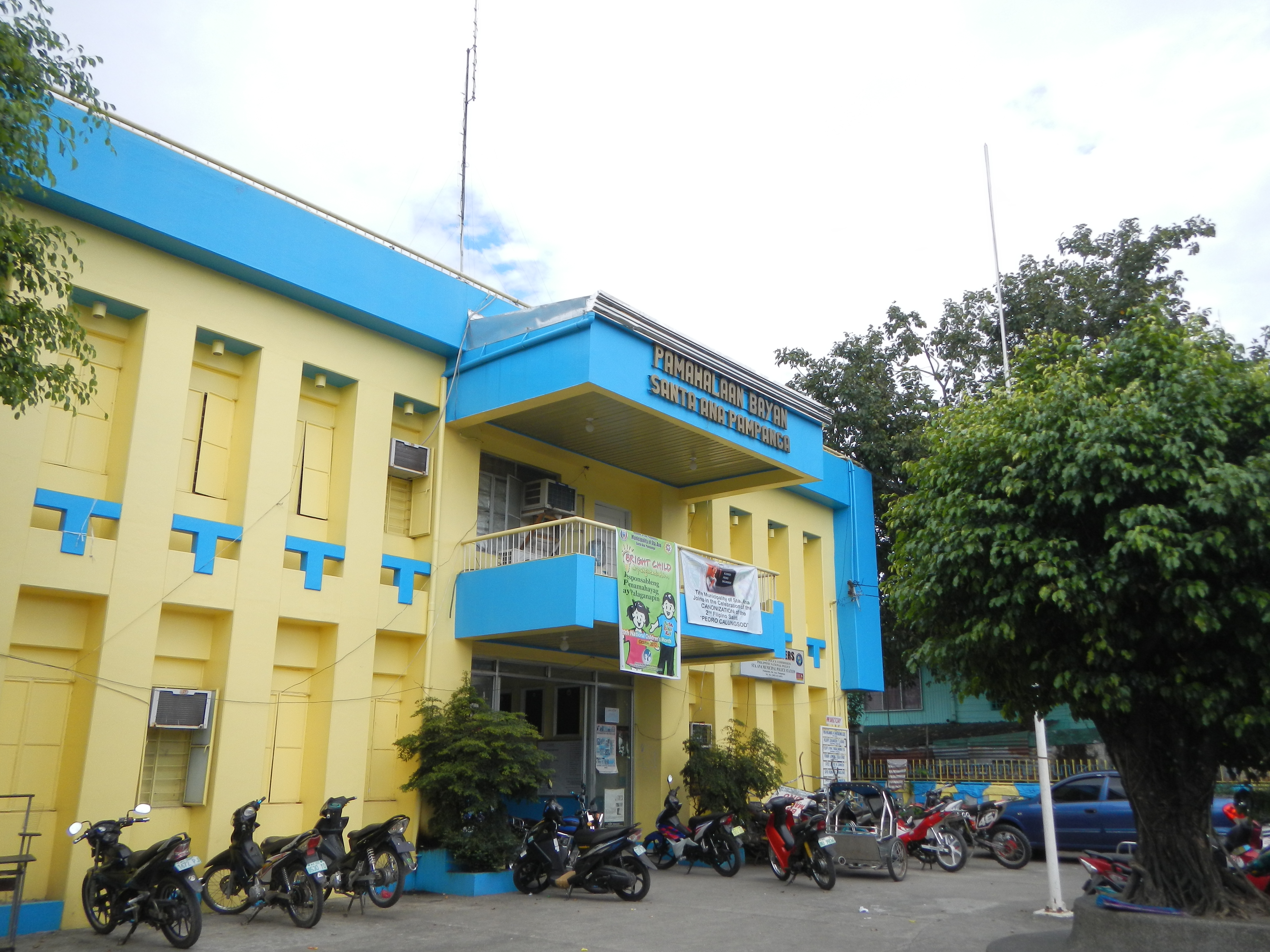
Town hall

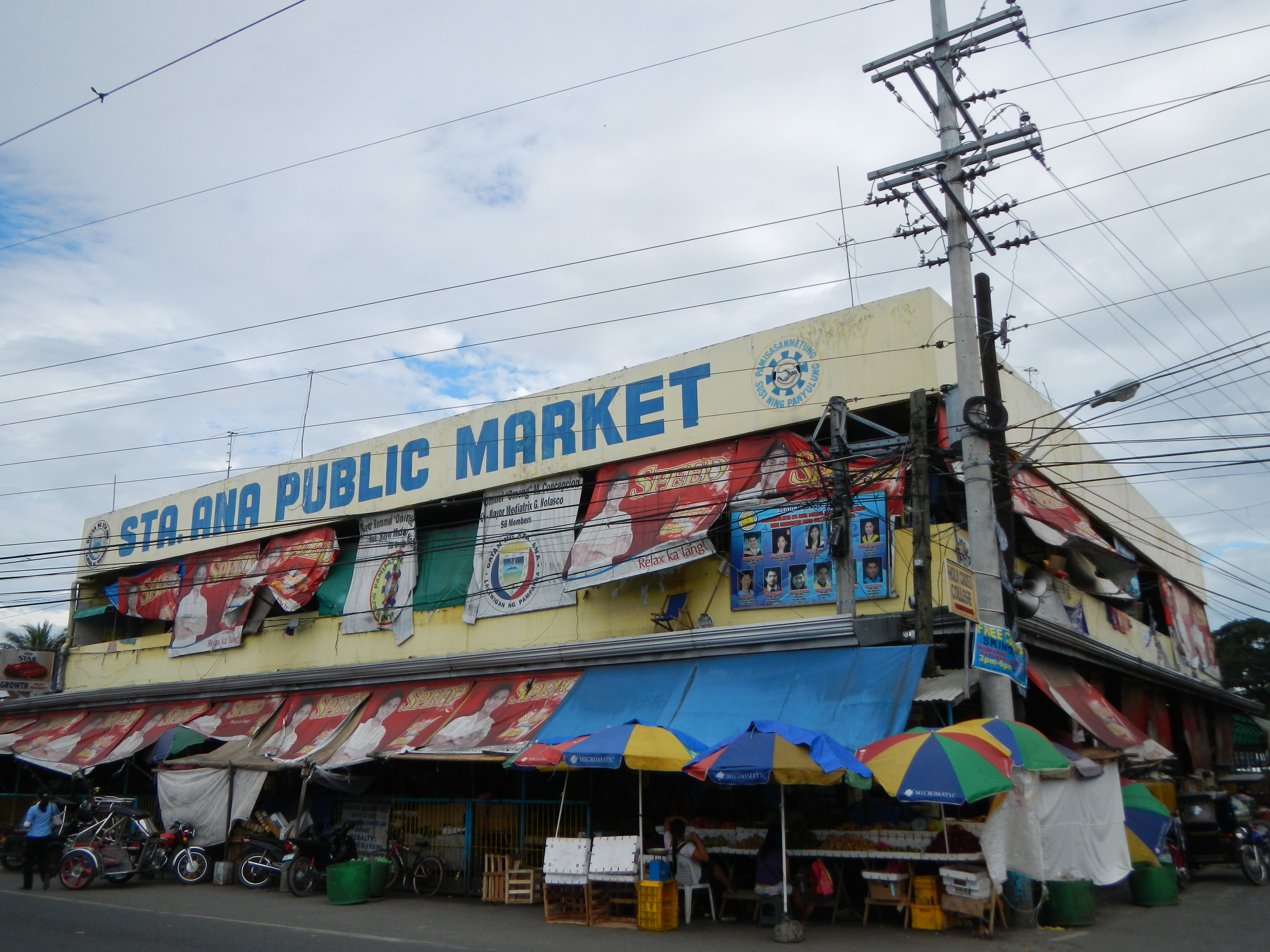
Public market

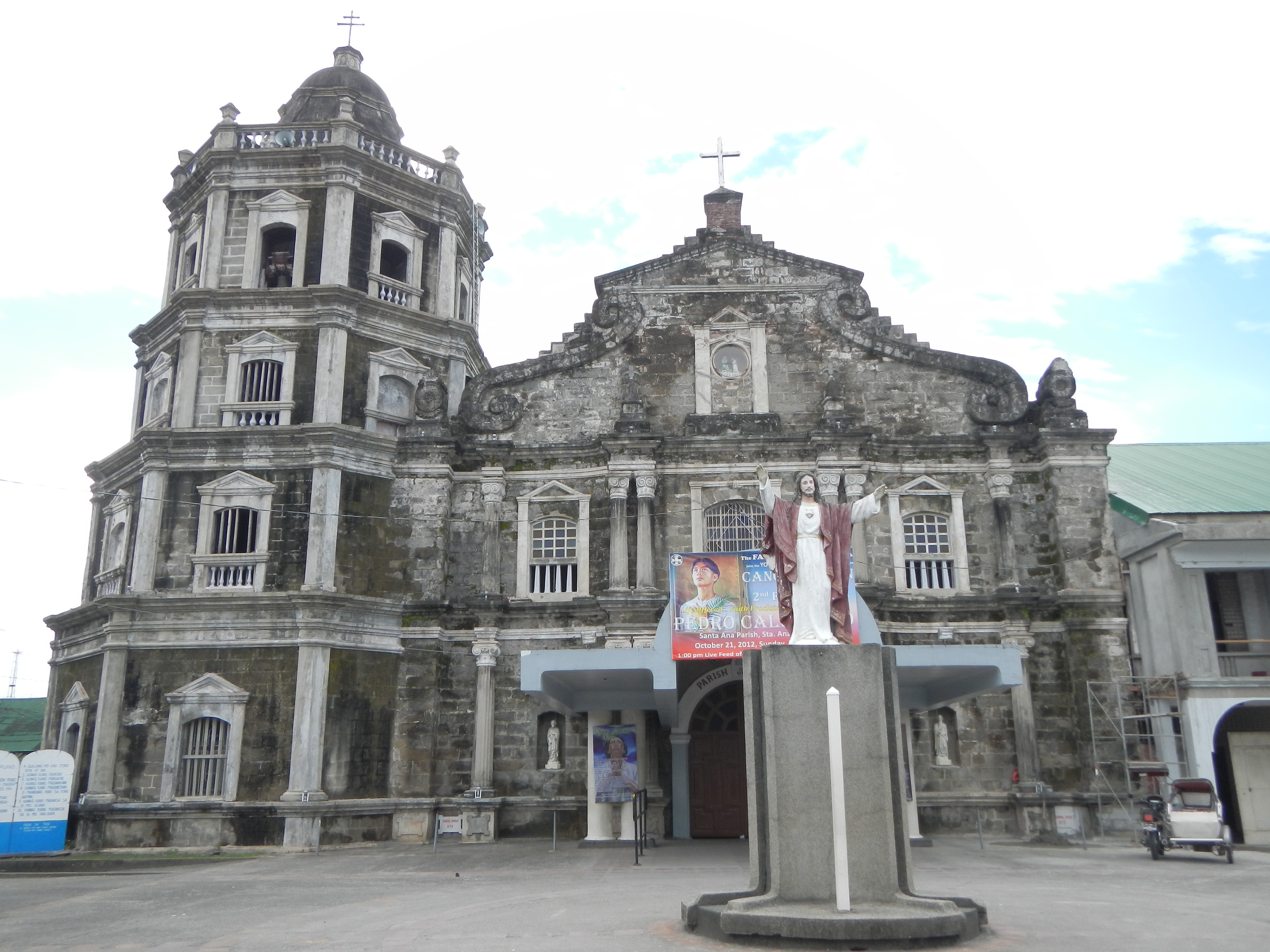
Santa Ana Parish Church (Founded 1756, Built on 1836)

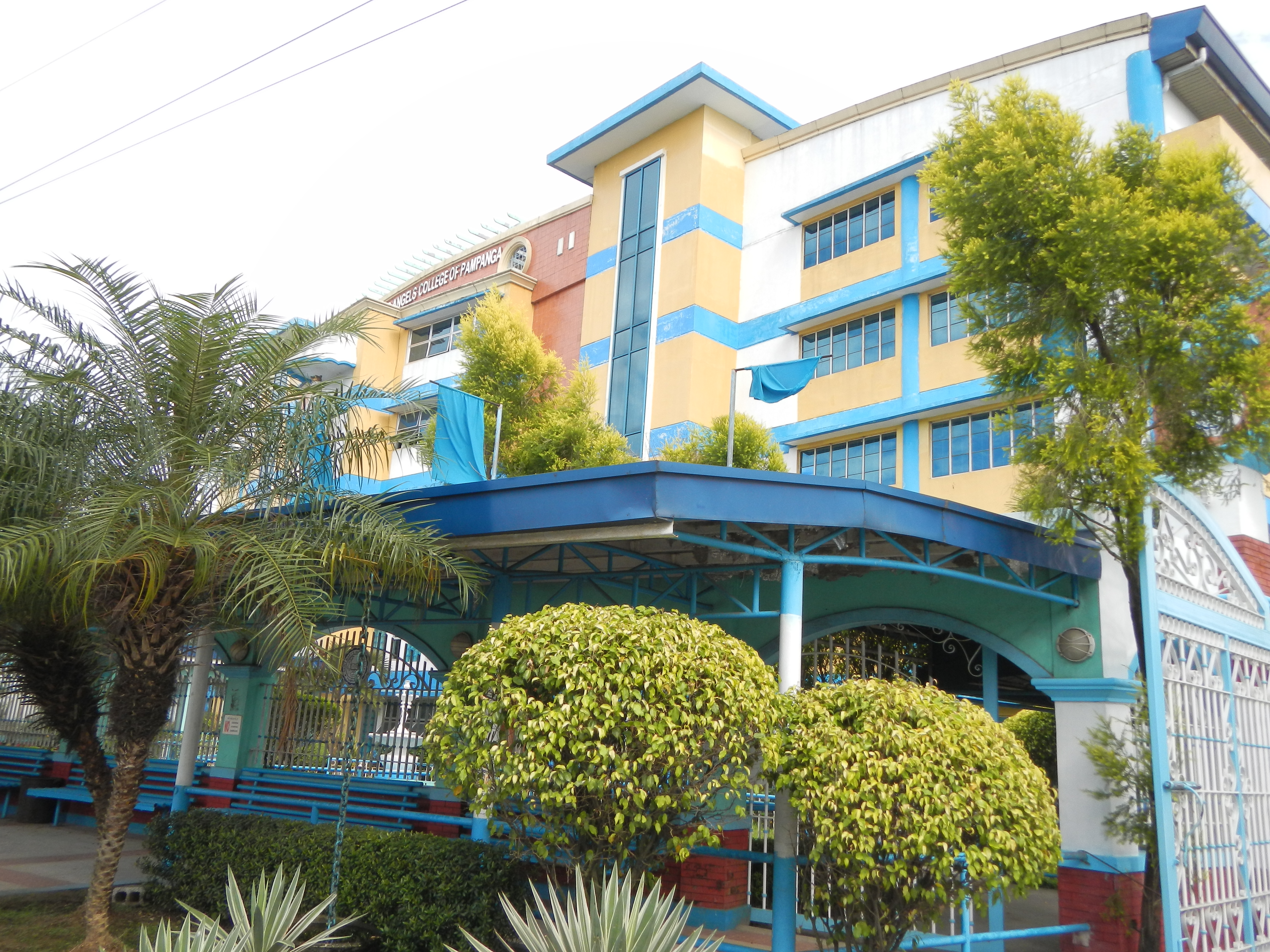
Saint Mary's Angels College of Pampanga

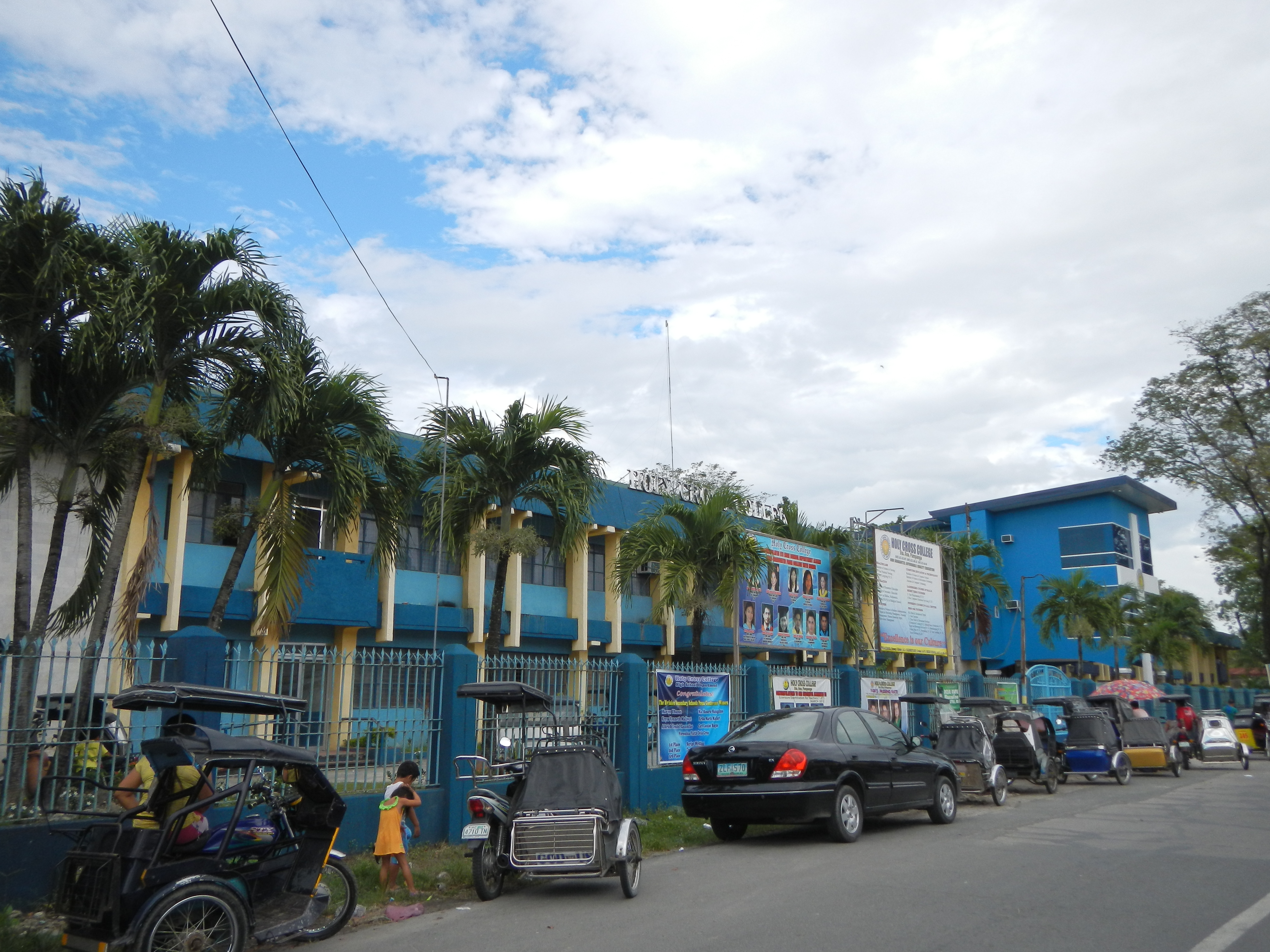
Holy Cross College
