= Betis =

Betis can refer to:

- The Latin name of the Guadalquivir river in Spain
- Real Betis, Spanish football club from Seville
  - Betis Deportivo Balompié, reserve team of Real Betis
- Betis CF, Spanish football club from Valladolid
- A district in the Philippine municipality of Guagua, Pampanga
- Betis Church, a Roman Catholic church in Guagua, Philippines
- The Indonesian and Malay word for calf
