= Paciano Aniceto =

Archbishop Emeritus of the Roman Catholic Archdiocese of San Fernando, Pampanga

The Most Reverend Paciano Aniceto D.D., GCGH
- Metropolitan Archbishop Emeritus of San Fernando
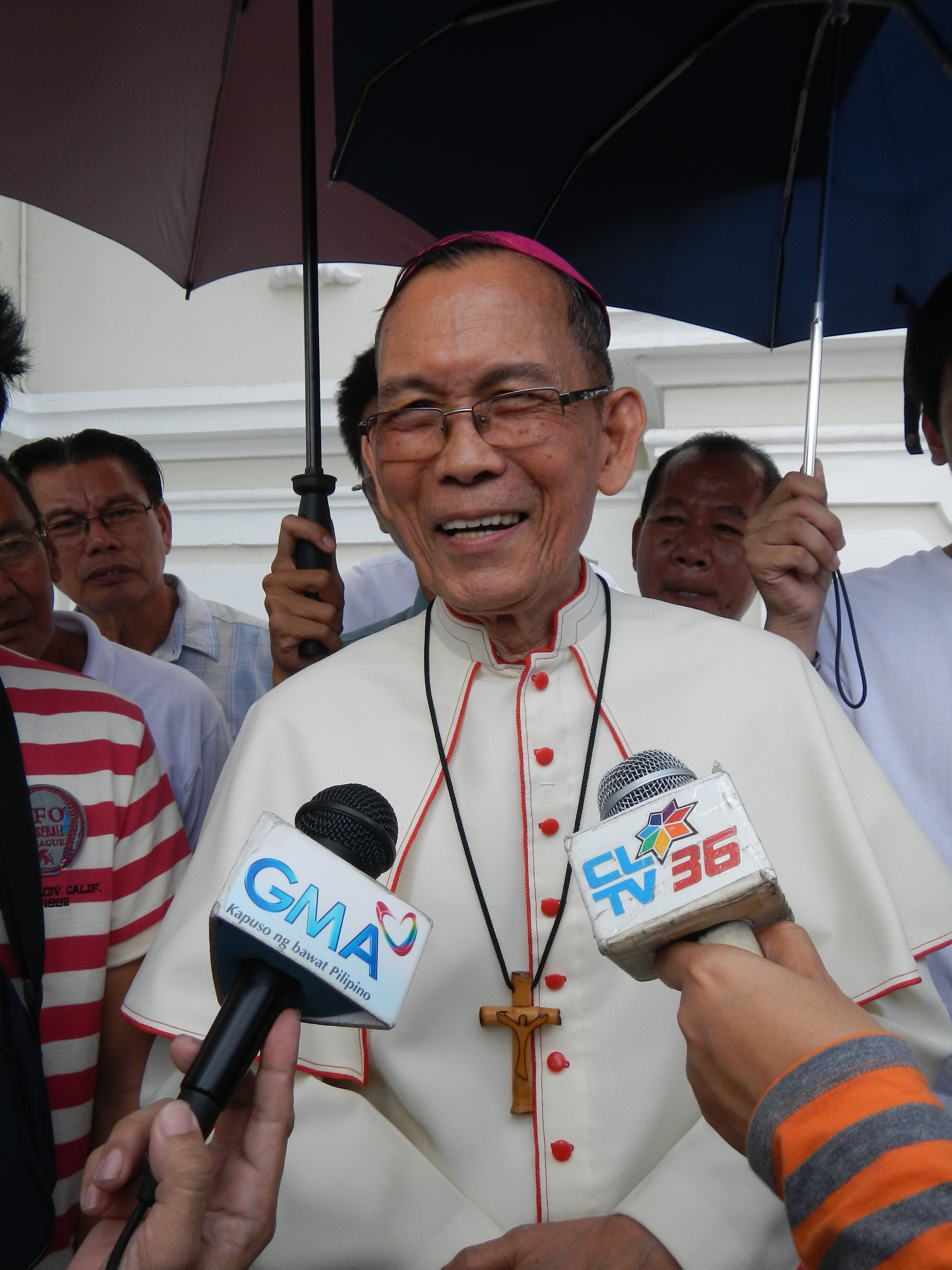
- Aniceto in 2014
- See: San Fernando
- Appointed: January 31, 1989
- Installed: March 14, 1989
- Retired: October 27, 2014
- Predecessor: Oscar Cruz
- Successor: Florentino Lavarias
- Previous posts: Auxiliary Bishop of Tuguegarao (1979–1983); Bishop of Iba (1983–1989)

Orders
- Ordination: December 23, 1962
- Consecration: May 27, 1979 by Pope John Paul II

Personal details
- Born: March 9, 1937 (age 89) Santa Ana, Pampanga, Philippine Commonwealth
- Denomination: Roman Catholic
- Motto: Ministerium tuum imple Fulfill your ministry
- Coat of arms

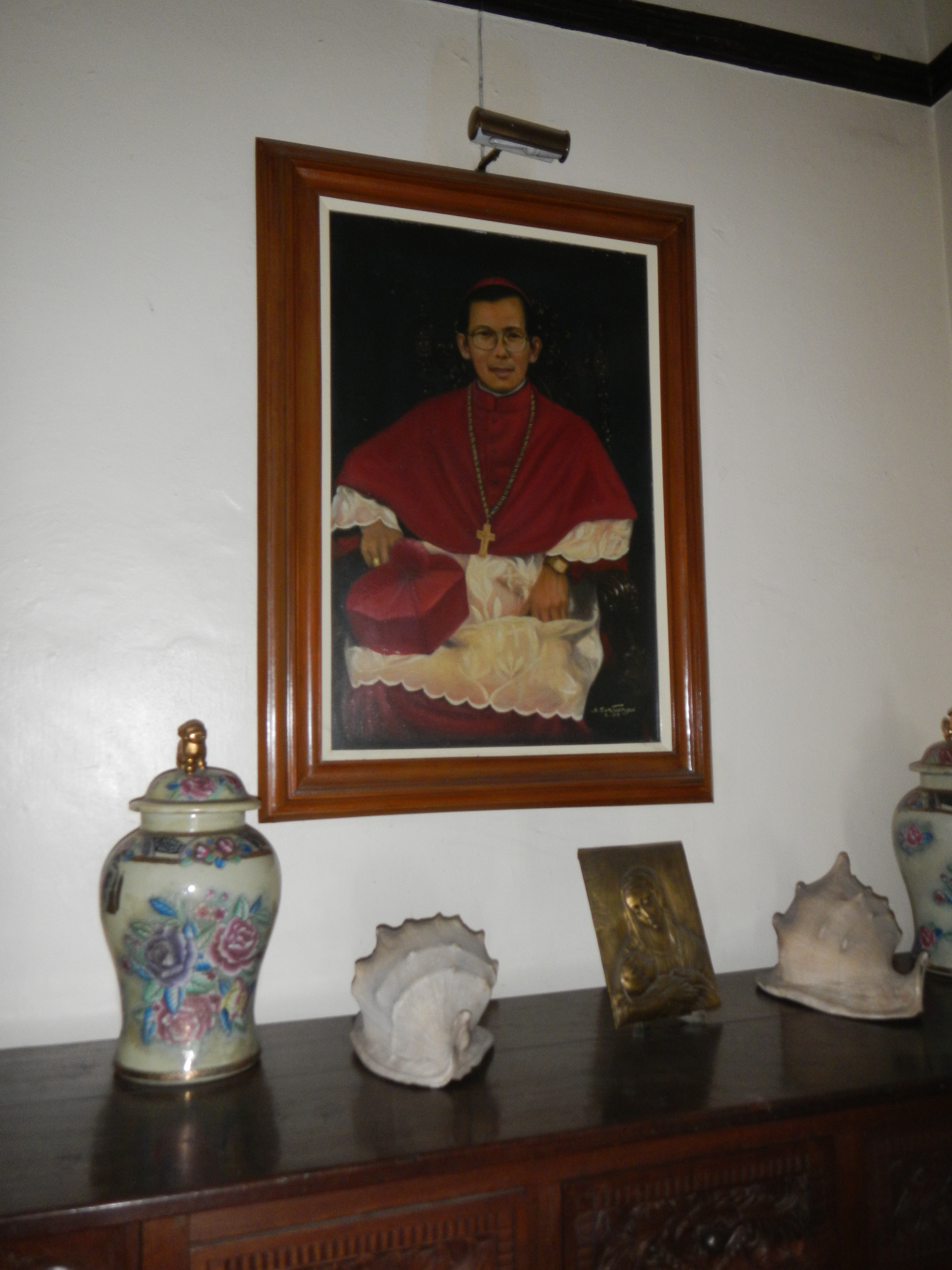
Archbishop Chancery, San Fernando, Pampanga

Paciano Basilio Aniceto GCGH (born March 9, 1937) is a Filipino Catholic prelate who served as the third Archbishop of San Fernando from March 14, 1989 to October 27, 2014.

== Biography ==
Aniceto was born on March 9, 1937, in the old town of Santa Ana, Pampanga. He was ordained a priest on December 23, 1962. He served various parishes under the Diocese of San Fernando (elevated to an Archdiocese on March 17, 1975, by Pope Paul VI.) He was appointed Auxiliary bishop of Tuguegarao City and Titular bishop of Tlos on April 7, 1979. He was consecrated as a Bishop on May 27, 1979. His principal consecrator was Pope John Paul II and his principal co-consecrators were Duraisamy Simon Cardinal Lourdusamy and Eduardo Cardinal Martinez Somalo.

On October 20, 1983, he was appointed Bishop of the Diocese of Iba, Zambales and served as Bishop for 5 years. Then on January 31, 1989, he was appointed to the Metropolitan See of the Archdiocese of San Fernando as Archbishop, succeeding Archbishop Oscar Cruz and was installed on March 14, 1989.

During his 25-year tenure as Metropolitan Archbishop of San Fernando, Aniceto presided on the installation ceremonies of three Bishops of Balanga into office namely Honesto Ongtioco (became bishop upon installation on June 18, 1998), Socrates Villegas (appointed May 3, 2004 and installed July 3, 2004), and Ruperto Santos (appointed April 1, 2010 and installed July 8, 2010).

On October 27, 2014, Aniceto resigned as Archbishop of San Fernando, Pampanga and was succeeded by Iba, Zambales Bishop Florentino Lavarias (appointed July 25, 2014 by Pope Francis).

On June 24, 2024, during the sede vacante apostolic administration of his successor Florentino Lavarias over the Diocese of Balanga in Bataan while awaiting for the installation of Ruperto Santos' successor as Bishop of Balanga and tenure of Fr. Percival Medina as rector and parish priest, Aniceto, as archbishop-emeritus of San Fernando, presided on a concelebrated mass as main celebrant for the feast of St. John Evangelist in Dinalupihan, Bataan together with the priests of the Diocese of Balanga as concelebrants.

Catholic Church titles
Preceded by Henry Charles Bryne, SSCME	Bishop of Iba; October 20, 1983 – January 31, 1989	Succeeded by Deogracias Iñiguez, Jr.
Preceded by Oscar V. Cruz	Archbishop of San Fernando; March 14, 1989 – October 27, 2014	Succeeded by Florentino Lavarias
