= Diocese of Balanga =

Catholic diocese in the Philippines

Diocese of Balanga Dioecesis Balangensis Diyosesis ng Balanga Diócesis de Balanga

Catholic
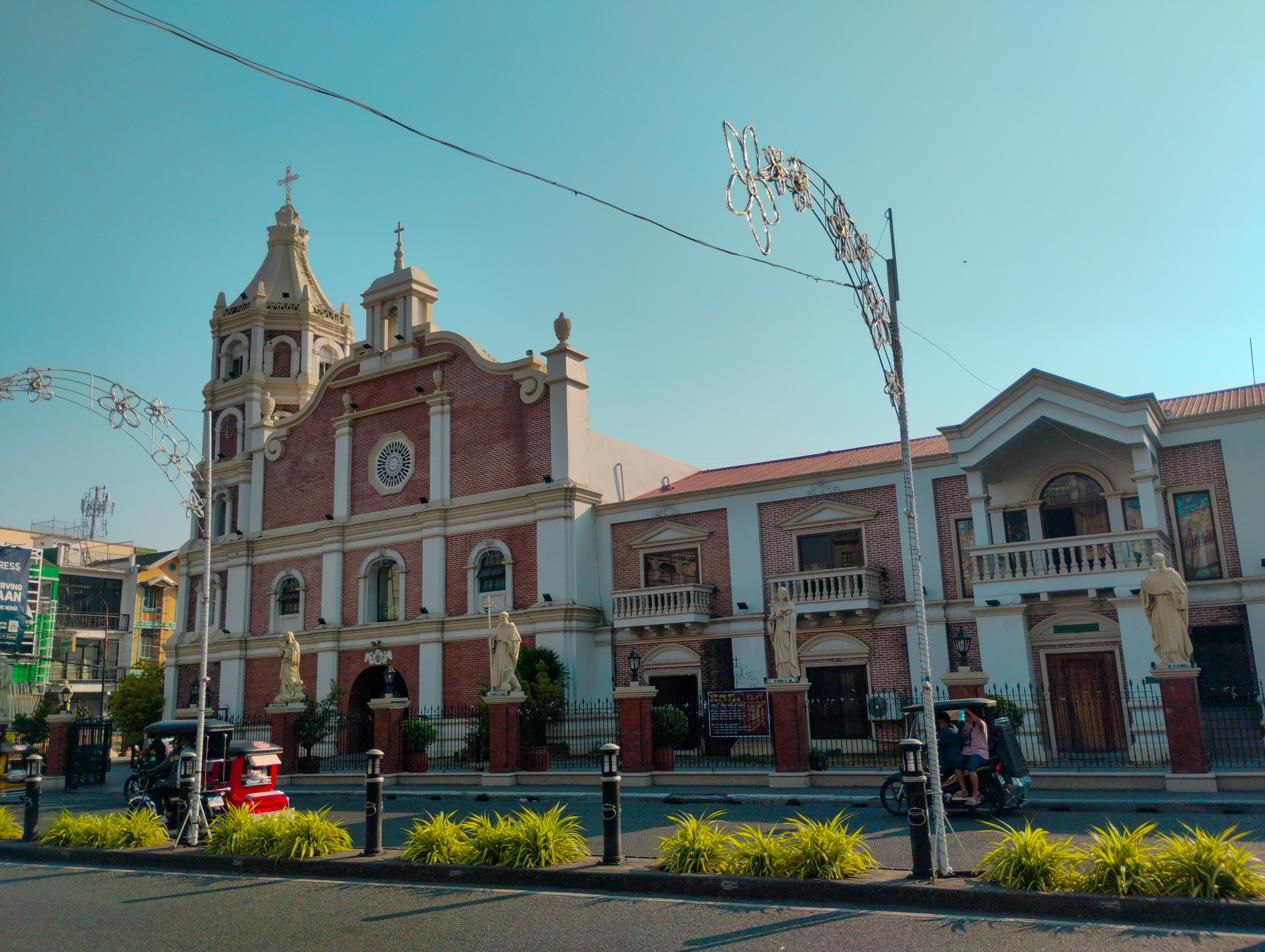
- Balanga Cathedral

- Coat of arms

Location
- Country: Philippines
- Territory: Bataan
- Ecclesiastical province: San Fernando
- Residence: Bishop's Residence, 41 Paterno Street, Poblacion, Balanga, Bataan
- Metropolitan: San Fernando
- Coordinates: 14.6792°N 120.5400°E

Statistics
- Area: 1,373 km^{2} (530 sq mi)
- Population: Total; Catholics: (as of 2023); 891,440; 863,610 (96.9%)
- Parishes: 38
- Schools: 11

Information
- Denomination: Catholic
- Sui iuris church: Latin Church
- Rite: Roman Rite
- Established: March 17, 1975; 51 years ago
- Cathedral: Cathedral-Shrine Parish of St. Joseph
- Patron saint: St. Joseph (Patron of the Diocese and City of Balanga); Our Lady of Orani (Patroness of the Province of Bataan and the Bataeño People)
- Secular priests: 62 (32 diocesan and 30 religious priests)
- Music: Bataan, Bayani, at Banal (2004–present)

Current leadership
- Pope: Leo XIV
- Bishop: Rufino C. Sescon, Jr.
- Metropolitan Archbishop: Florentino G. Lavarias
- Vicar General: Antonio Quintos, Jr.
- Judicial Vicar: Hernando B. Guanzon

Map
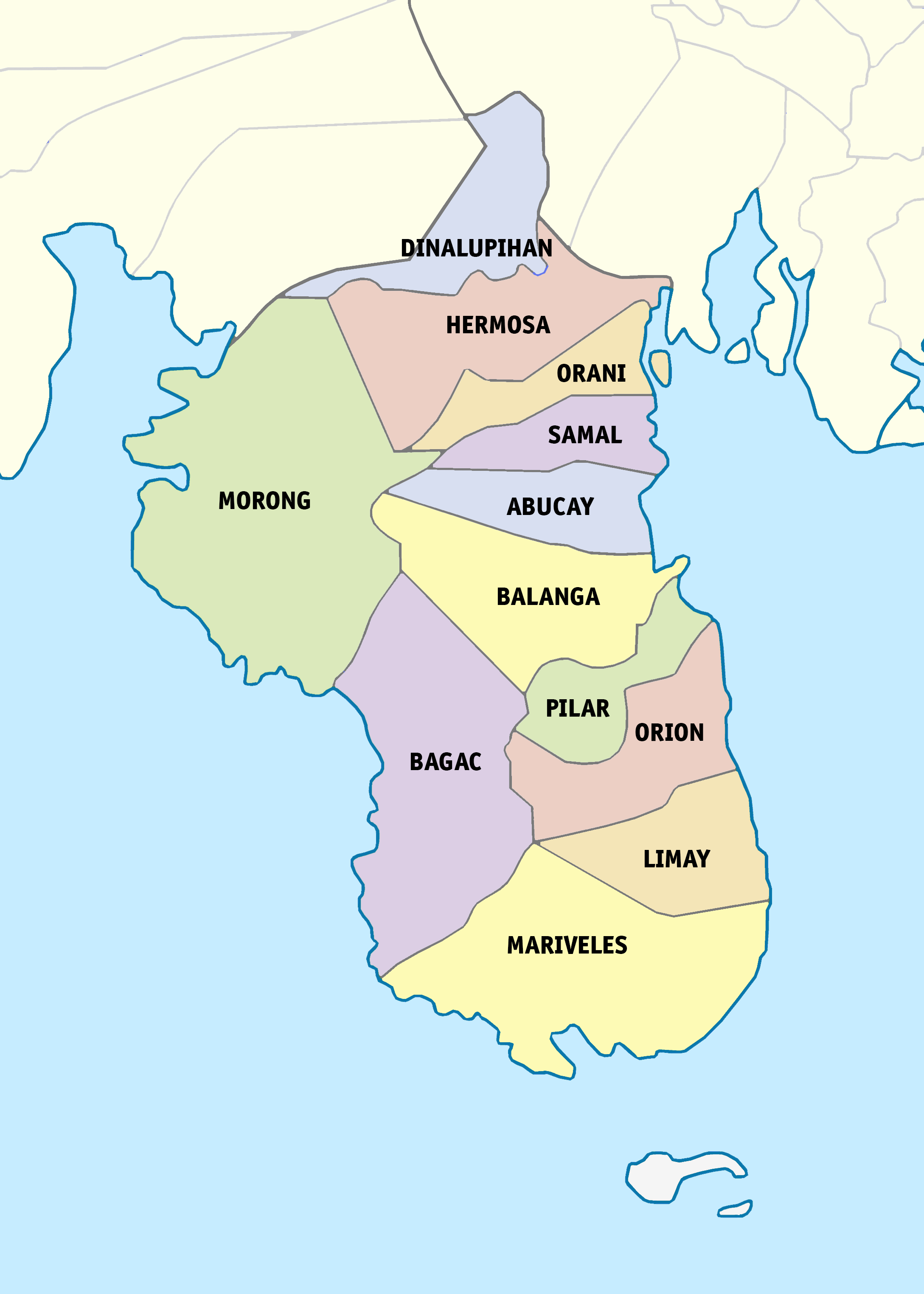

Website
- www.facebook.com/balangadiocese/

The Diocese of Balanga is a Latin Church diocese of the Catholic Church in the Philippines, established on March 17, 1975, by Pope Paul VI. The diocese has jurisdiction over the whole province of Bataan, with 38 parishes, six diocesan shrines, one minor basilica, chaplaincy, quasi-parish, national shrine and chapel, and four vicariates. The Cathedral-Shrine Parish of St. Joseph, Husband of Mary in Aguire Street, serves as the seat of the diocese and office of the bishop of Balanga, while the bishop's residence is at 41 Paterno Street, Poblacion, Balanga. It is part of the Ecclesiastical Province of San Fernando, Pampanga. The titular patron of the diocese is Saint Joseph, whose feast day is celebrated twice on March 19 and the city's fiesta on April 28.

Since March 1, 2025, Rufino Sescon, the former rector of Quiapo Church in Manila, is the fifth and current bishop of the diocese.

== History ==
The Diocese of Balanga was established on March 17, 1975 by Pope Paul VI through the papal bull Quoniam Recte Universum. It comprises the entire civil province of Bataan, the smallest among the provinces of Central Luzon. The province is a peninsula jutting out to sea, with Manila Bay to the east, South China Sea to the west, and the province of Zambales to the north. Only 1 of the 15 priests of the diocese was a native of Bataan when Bishop Celso Guevarra was installed as the diocese's first bishop on November 8, 1975 and separated Bataan from the Archdiocese of San Fernando, Pampanga eight months after its establishment.

Before this, the region was divided into two parts: the Corregimiento of Mariveles and the Province of Pampanga. The towns of Mariveles, Bagac, Morong and Maragondon, Cavite, comprised the Corregimiento of Mariveles that was under the jurisdiction of the Recollect Order. The province of Pampanga included the towns of Orion, Pilar, Balanga, Abucay, Samal, Orani, Llana Hermosa and San Juan de Dinalupihan. The latter group was under the charge of the Dominican Order. Limay, the twelfth town of Bataan, was named only in 1917.

The topography of the province has made most of the inhabitants farmers or fishermen, with a sprinkling of merchants, factory workers and professionals. Recent years, however, have seen the development of manufacturing industries in the province, particularly the Free Zone in Mariveles which has brought an influx of workers from other provinces and improved living conditions of its own workers.

Historically, Bataan is most remembered, along with the island of Corregidor, as the main scene of action in the Philippines during the Second World War. These places are strategic in guarding the entrance to Manila Bay. The surrender of Filipino and American soldiers to overwhelming Japanese forces marked the Fall of Bataan in 1942. A war memorial, Dambana ng Kagitingan, now stands to honor the men who fought and died in that last stand.

During the 23-year tenure of Bishop Celso Guevarra, the diocese has grown from 13 parishes to 25. Together with their parish priests, the lay leaders have renovated and/or totally rebuilt their parish churches and convents. The major diocesan commissions, which have been established, introduced new apostolates in the diocese and in the parishes. It was also under Guevarra's tenure in 1995 that the Diocesan Schools of Bataan Educational Foundation, Inc. (DSOBEFI) was established to integrate Catholic schools in Bataan into the diocese.

Honesto Ongtioco (now bishop-emeritus of Cubao), who succeeded Bishop Celso, guided the young diocese as it celebrated its 25th anniversary and as it responded to the call of Pope John Paul II at the beginning of the third millennium, "Duc in Altum." During the diocese's silver anniversary, the Fr. Mariano G. Sarili Hall was dedicated on December 7, 2000 (23 days before Balanga converted from a municipality to city on December 30), with the hall was named after the first Filipino priest of the diocese and province. His kindness and charity allowed the various branches of the diocesan tree to grow in different directions in pursuit of his plan to convoke a Diocesan Pastoral Assembly. Bishop Ongtioco laid the foundation for the realization of his vision when he was installed to lead the new Diocese of Cubao in Quezon City on August 28, 2003.

On October 22, 2005, under the tenure of Socrates Villegas, the six-year term of each parish and church of the diocese began. Each rector and parish priest will serve the whole term, except if one dies. The bishop of Balanga decided to have a fill-in priest to serve the remaining part of a current term, or if there is no priest designated, the bishop will become a parish administrator of a particular parish where the official position is vacant.

On December 8, 2008, Clinica Diocesano de San Jose, the diocese's clinic, was founded. It is a weekly medical and dental mission for the poor people of Bataan.

At the second half of the third 2017–2023 subsequent six-year term of the diocese from June 5, 2020 to June 4, 2023, Ruperto Santos became the parish administrator of Diocesan Shrine and Parish of St. Nicholas Tolentine in Mariveles, Bataan. This was due to the workers from the Freeport Area of Bataan (FAB) expressing opposition against the parish's programs under its last rector and parish priest Rev. Fr. Gerry Jorge, which forced him to step down. There was no fill-in priest for that term available to be designated, making him the first bishop to hold the position in a particular parish.

On July 22, 2023, Bataan returned temporarily to the jurisdiction of Archdiocese of San Fernando after 47 years and 8 months when Santos became Bishop of Antipolo, covering Rizal Province as well as Marikina City in Metro Manila where Pope Francis appointed Archbishop Florentino Lavarias as sede vacante apostolic administrator or temporary bishop of the diocese which lasted until Rufino Sescon became fifth bishop on March 1, 2025, 16 days before the diocese turned 50 on March 17 of that year.

The diocese celebrated its 50th anniversary from March 17 to November 7, 2025. Its logo was unveiled and first used in 2020 under Ruperto Santos as its preparation. The mass for the diocese's anniversary was presided over by Charles John Brown (apostolic nuncio to the Philippines), Florentino Lavarias, Teodoro Bacani (bishop-emeritus of Novaliches), former bishops Honesto Ongtioco and Socrates Villegas, and current bishop Rufino Sescon. It was ended when Sescon closed the celebration on November 7, one day before the diocese's 50th canonical erection anniversary and separation of Bataan from San Fernando.

== Diocesan coat of arms ==
The miter symbolizes the pastoral authority of a bishop with which he will be exercising the office of his position, represented by the Balanga Cathedral, within the diocese's jurisdiction, which is the entire province of Bataan.

=== 50th anniversary coat of arms ===
The coat of arms for the diocese's 50th anniversary also has a miter which symbolizes the bishop's pastoral authority which will be exercising within the province of Bataan and three-stemmed lilies which is the symbol of Saint Joseph. It was used for 2 years from March 2023 during the last months of Ruperto Santos as fourth Bishop of Balanga until the celebrations closed by his successor Rufino Sescon on November 7, 1975.

The three red crosses symbolizes the Holy Trinity (God the Father, Jesus Christ, and the Holy Spirit), four small crosses inside a circle symbolizing the four former bishops of the diocese (Bishops Celso Guevarra, Honesto Ongtioco, Socrates Villegas, and [Santos), seven red and blue lines signifies the seven sacraments of the Catholic Church, symbols of Dominican and Augustinian orders at the left and right side of the miter indicating that they are the missionaries who went to the province in order to teach the faith, with Dominicans built the churches of Abucay, Samal, Balanga, Orani, Pilar, Hermosa, and Orion, while the Augustinians built the Morong, Bagac, and Mariveles church. The number 50 and the years 1975 and 2025 represents the 50th anniversary of the diocese, with 1975 indicate the diocese's founding and 2025 for its 50th year. At the lower left is the letter "M" symbol (which is also used on the coat of arms of Bishop Ruperto Santos as Bishop of Balanga) symbolizing Virgin Mary serving as the diocese's and province's patroness under the name of Virgen Milagrosa de Orani and showing the devotion of the Bataan people to her. At the right is the map of Bataan from which the diocese has jurisdiction and authority with. At the bottom is a golden banner which has the text "Magtipon (Gather), Maglakbay (Travel), at Maghasik (Sow)" which are the theme for its 50th anniversary. "The daughters of kings, women of honor, are maidens in your courts. And standing beside you, glistening in your pure and golden glory, is the beautiful bride-to-be!" comes from Psalms 45, the word of God which is a guide for the celebration of 50 years of the diocese.

== Schools ==
The Diocese of Balanga has 11 schools as of 2017, with 10 are operated by the diocese's Diocesan Schools of Bataan Educational Foundation, Inc. (DSOBEFI) under its superintendent Fr. Edgardo Sigua and assistant Fr. Alwin B. Bobis since June 2024.

- St. Catherine of Siena Academy, Samal (1960)
- St. John Academy, Dinalupihan (1960)
- Holy Rosary Parochial Institute, Orani (1963)
- St. Michael the Archangel Academy, Orion (1982)
- St. Nicholas Catholic School of Mariveles (1984)
- Our Lady of the Pillar Parochial School, Morong (1992)
- St. Peter of Verona Academy, Hermosa (1998)
- Blessed Regina Protmann Catholic School, Mt. View, Mariveles (2007)
- St. James Catholic School of Morong (2008)
- Virgen Milagrosa Del Rosario College Seminary (2015)
- Colegio Santa Catarina de Alexandria, Bagac (2017)

== Mt. Samat pilgrimage ==
Since the tenure of Socrates Villegas (now archbishop of Lingayen-Dagupan) as the diocese's third bishop in 2004, the annual celebration Mt. Samat pilgrimage, held on November or December of the year, is done consecutively every before the first Sunday of Advent except 2010, the first under Bishop Ruperto Santos as fourth bishop, and 2024 where the former held on December 11 and the pilgrimage was not celebrated due to having no bishop of Balanga yet and available person to preside the celebration on that year for the latter. It is basically the diocese's counterpart to the Holy See's World Youth Day and World Meeting of Families that began by Pope John Paul II who appointed Villegas with the latter implementing the pilgrimage after having a background for being the CEO of the former in 1995 and the latter in 2003 where the youth attend the event for religious purposes locally. Villegas presided over the pilgrimage in 2009 and 2023 even after he already stepped down as bishop of Balanga on November 4, 2009.

It has a theme song titled "Bataan: Bayani at Banal" written by Villegas and music by Ryan Cayabyab which is also the anthem of the diocese since then. It involves pilgrims climbing from the foot of Mount Samat to the shrine where a Mass is held and fireworks display at night.

Bishops and apostolic administrators	Number of pilgrimages attended, years, and dates
Socrates Villegas	7 (2004 (November 27), 2005 (November 26), 2006 (December 2), 2007 (December 1), 2008 (November 30), 2009 (November 28), 2023 (December 2)
Ruperto Santos	13 (2010 (December 11), 2011 (November 26), 2012 (December 1), 2013 (November 30), 2014 (November 29), 2015 (November 28), 2016 (November 26), 2017 (December 2), 2018 (December 1), 2019 (November 30), 2020 (November 29), 2021 (November 28), 2022 (November 27)
Florentino Lavarias	1 (2023 (December 2)
Rufino Sescon	1 (2025 (November 29))

== Diocesan officials and timeline ==
This section shows the overall officials of the diocese. For mainstay bishop-specific information not including temporary ones, see Bishop of Balanga.

For sede vacante diocesan at the next table and apostolic administrators or temporary bishops, end date calculation is included if started at the date of a current bishop stepping down to indicate transition from one bishop to another and between bishops in office for the former and latter, respectively, while those started few days after a bishop steps down do not apply the said calculation.

No.	Name and coat of arms	Period in position	Appointed by	Ordained by	Installed into office by (papal nuncio of the Philippines and archbishop of San Fernando, Pampanga)		Notes
1	Celso Nogoy Guevarra (1923–2002; Capas, Tarlac)	November 8, 1975 – June 18, 1998; 22 years, 7 months and 10 days (8,258 days)	Paul VI	Carmine Rocco (Indianapolis)	Bruno Torpigliani	Emilio A. Cinense (territorial takeover from the archdiocese)	Longest-serving bishop of Balanga. He died on August 13, 2002.
2	Honesto Flores "Ness" Ongtioco (1948– ; San Fernando, Pampanga)	June 18, 1998 – August 28, 2003; 5 years, 2 months and 10 days (1,897 days)	John Paul II	Jaime Sin (Manila)	Gian Vincenzo Moreni	Paciano Aniceto	Became bishop of Cubao from August 28, 2003 to December 3, 2024 and sede vacante apostolic administrator (temporary bishop) of Malolos covering the province of Bulacan and Valenzuela, Metro Manila from May 11, 2018 to August 21, 2019.
After Honesto Ongtioco left Balanga to serve as bishop of Cubao, Msgr. Antonio "Tony" S. Dumaual (died July 21, 2023 and funeral July 31, 2023) became the diocesan administrator during the sede vacante period from August 28, 2003 until Ongtioco's successor Socrates Villegas was installed into office as the diocese's third bishop on July 3, 2004 following his May 3, 2004 appointment to the overall position, serving for 10 months and 7 days (311 days) and oversaw the cathedral's preparations for the installation of Villegas (placing the bishop's new coat of arms at the cathedra) from June to July 2004.
3	Socrates Buenaventura "Soc" Villegas (1960–; Pateros, Rizal (now Metro Manila))	May 3, 2004 – November 4, 2009; 5 years, 6 months and 1 day (2,011 days)	John Paul II	Jaime Sin (Manila)	Antonio Franco	Paciano Aniceto	Took overall position on May 3, 2004 and office on July 3, 2004 as such the first bishop of Balanga to take the position and office separately, youngest to take the overall position upon appointment and office at the installation and leave both, became archbishop of Lingayen-Dagupan on November 4, 2009.
A day after Socrates Villegas became archbishop of Lingayen-Dagupan on November 5, 2009, Msgr. Victor dela Cruz "Vic" Ocampo became the diocesan administrator during sede vacante period from the said date of November 2009 until Villegas's successor Ruperto Santos was installed into office as fourth bishop on July 8, 2010 following his April 1, 2010 (Holy Week, Holy Triduum, and Holy Thursday of 2010) appointment to the overall position, serving for 8 months and 3 days (245 days) and oversaw the preparations for the installation of Santos (placing the bishop's new coat of arms at the cathedra and cathedral floor) from July 5 to 8, 2010.
4	Ruperto Cruz "Stude" Santos (1957–; San Rafael, Bulacan)	April 1, 2010 – July 22, 2023; 13 years, 3 months and 21 days (4,860 days)	Benedict XVI	Jaime Sin (Manila)	Edward Joseph Adams	Paciano Aniceto	First bishop in the Philippines to start episcopate in the 2010s decade upon taking the position on April 1, 2010, took office on July 8, 2010, longest-living serving bishop and second overall since October 2015, served in all years of the Catholic Church involvement over his appointing pope Benedict XVI both as pope and pope-emeritus until funeral on January 5, 2023, became parish administrator of Mariveles Church from June 5, 2020 to June 4, 2023, elevated more churches into higher status than his three predecessors combined, became Bishop of Antipolo on July 22, 2023.
After Santos left Balanga to serve as bishop of Antipolo, Archbishop Florentino Lavarias, archbishop of San Fernando, Pampanga since October 27, 2014, was appointed apostolic administrator during the sede vacante period of the diocese from July 22, 2023 until Santos' successor Rufino Sescon, Jr. became the diocese's fifth bishop upon installation on March 1, 2025 and oversaw the preparations for becoming Sescon as bishop of Balanga from February to March 1, 2025, serving for 1 year, 7 months and 8 days (589 days) and returning Bataan temporarily to the said archdiocese after 47 years during that period. He returned to primary governance of the Archdiocese of San Fernando after Sescon's start as bishop of the diocese in March 2025.
5	Rufino Coronel "Jun" Sescon, Jr. (1972–; Manila)	March 1, 2025 – present 1 year, 8 months and 16 days	Francis	Jaime Sin (Manila)	Charles John Brown	Florentino Lavarias (outgoing apostolic administrator at the time of installation ceremony)	Current bishop.

== Lay people and priests of the diocese who became bishops, and bishops into bishop-emeritus on another diocese after serving as bishop of Balanga ==
- Honesto Ongtioco, first bishop of Cubao (August 28, 2003 – December 3, 2024) and bishop-emeritus of Cubao (since December 3, 2024)
- Teodoro Bacani Jr. (Balanga), first bishop of Novaliches (January 16 – November 25, 2003)
- Oscar V. Cruz (Balanga), fourth archbishop of Lingayen-Dagupan (July 15, 1991 – November 4, 2009)
- Victor C. Ocampo, third bishop of Gumaca (September 3, 2015 – March 16, 2023)

== See also ==
- Catholic Church in the Philippines
- List of Catholic dioceses in the Philippines
