= Orani Church =

Latin Catholic church in Bataan, Philippines

- Minor Basilica and Shrine Parish of Our Lady of the Rosary of Orani
- Minor Basilica and Parish Church of Virgen Milgrosa del Rosario del Pueblo de Orani
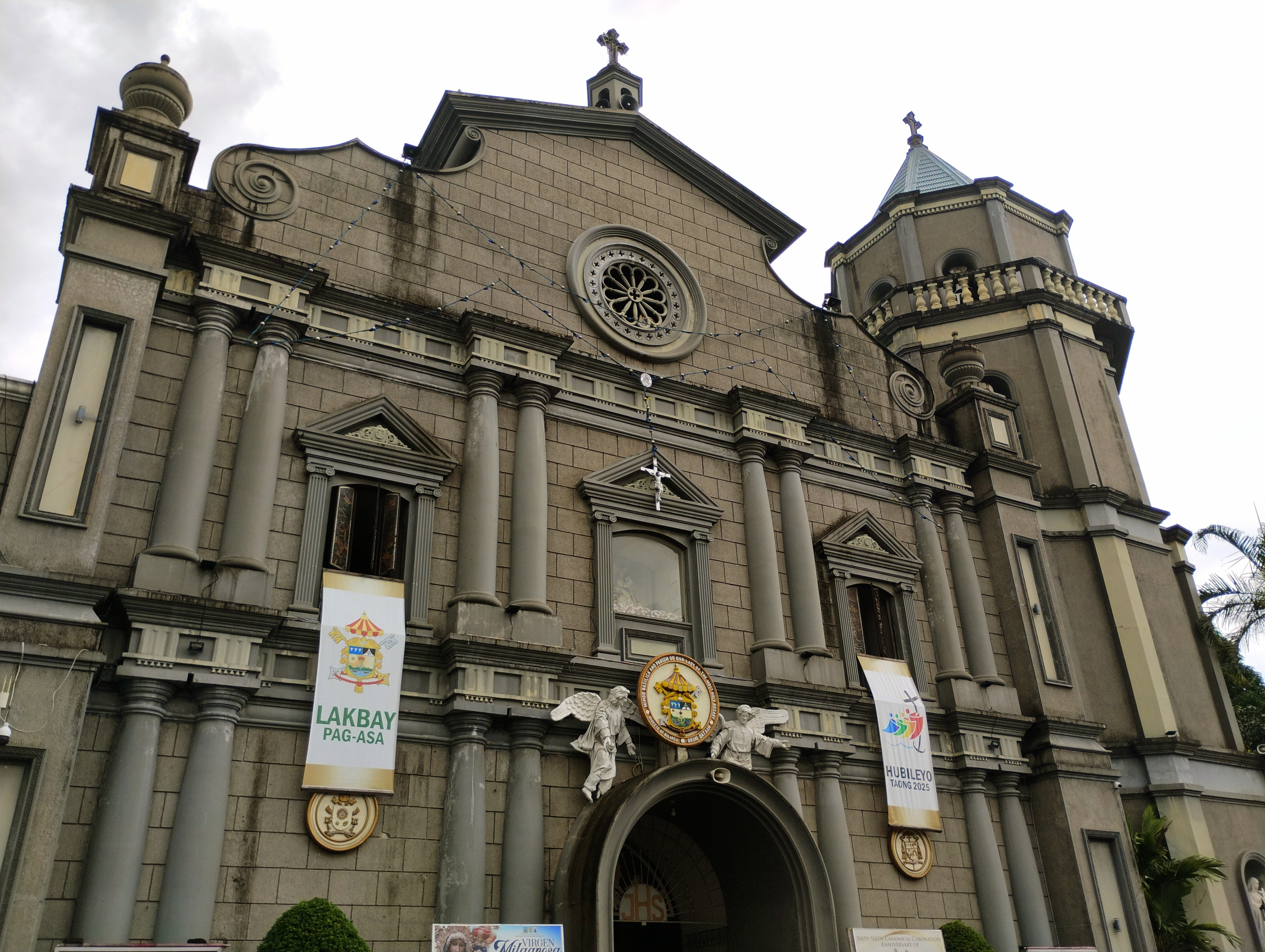
- The church in 2025

- Location in Luzon Location in the Philippines
- 14°48′02″N 120°32′08″E
- Location: Poblacion, Orani, Bataan
- Country: Philippines
- Denomination: Catholic
- Website: Facebook page

History
- Status: Minor basilica
- Dedication: Our Lady of the Rosary
- Consecrated: April 21, 1714

Architecture
- Functional status: Active
- Heritage designation: "Pilgrim Shrine"
- Designated: August 22, 2004
- Architectural type: Church building
- Style: Neoclassical
- Groundbreaking: 1792, 1891
- Completed: 1796, 1938

Administration
- Division: Vicariate of St. Dominic De Guzman
- Province: San Fernando
- Metropolis: San Fernando
- Archdiocese: San Fernando
- Diocese: Balanga
- Parish: Our Lady of the Rosary

Clergy
- Archbishop: Florentino G. Lavarias
- Bishop: Rufino C. Sescon, Jr.
- Vicar: Jhoen Buenaventura
- Priest(s): Antonio "Tony" M. Quintos, Jr.

The Minor Basilica and Shrine Parish of Our Lady of the Rosary of Orani, commonly known as Orani Church, is a Latin Catholic minor basilica built in the Neoclassical style located in the center of Orani, Bataan, in the Philippines. It is under the jurisdiction of the Diocese of Balanga.

== Description ==
The Church of Orani is under the jurisdiction of the Diocese of Balanga; It is part of the Vicariate of Our Lady of the Most Holy Rosary. The titular patron saint is Our Lady of the Most Holy Rosary. The church is named after its patroness, commonly known as "Our Lady of Orani". She is also known as the Virgen Milagrosa, a name given to her by her many devotees in light of a number of miracles attributed to her intercession.

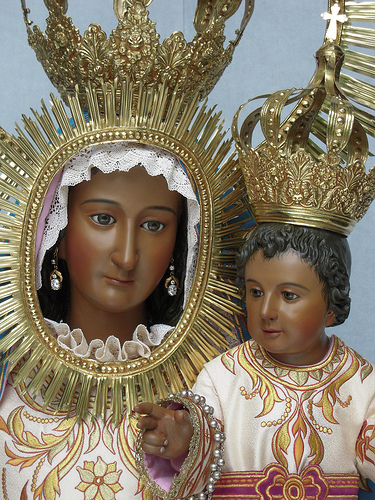
Our Lady of Orani

The title "Our Lady of the Rosary," or "Our Lady of the Most Holy Rosary," is a title of the Blessed Virgin Mary that has traditionally been promoted by the Order of Preachers (more popularly known as the Dominican Order) ever since it was founded by Dominic de Guzman in the 13th century. In 1571 Pope Pius V, a Dominican friar himself, instituted the feast of "Our Lady of Victory" to commemorate the victory of the Catholic naval forces in the Battle of Lepanto. The victory was attributed to the intercession of the Blessed Virgin Mary, as a rosary procession had been offered on that day in St. Peter's Square in Rome for the success of the mission of the Holy League to hold back Ottoman forces from overrunning Western Europe. In 1573, Pope Gregory XIII changed the title of this feast to the "Feast of the Holy Rosary". This feast was extended by Pope Clement XI to the whole of the Latin Rite, inserting it into the General Roman Calendar in 1716. In 1960 under Pope John XXIII it is listed under the title Feast of the Blessed Virgin Mary of the Rosary; and under the 1969 liturgical reforms of Pope Paul VI Our Lady of the Rosary is mentioned as a mandatory memorial. In Orani, the patronal feast day is celebrated on the second Sunday of October.

On April 18, 1959, Nuestra Señora del Rosario was canonically crowned in a solemn ceremony headed by the Archbishop of San Fernando and the Apostolic Nuncio to the Philippines.

Since June 5, 2023, the rector and parish priest of Orani is Antonio "Tony" M. Quintos, Jr. Orani's Catholic population is about 33,957.

== History ==
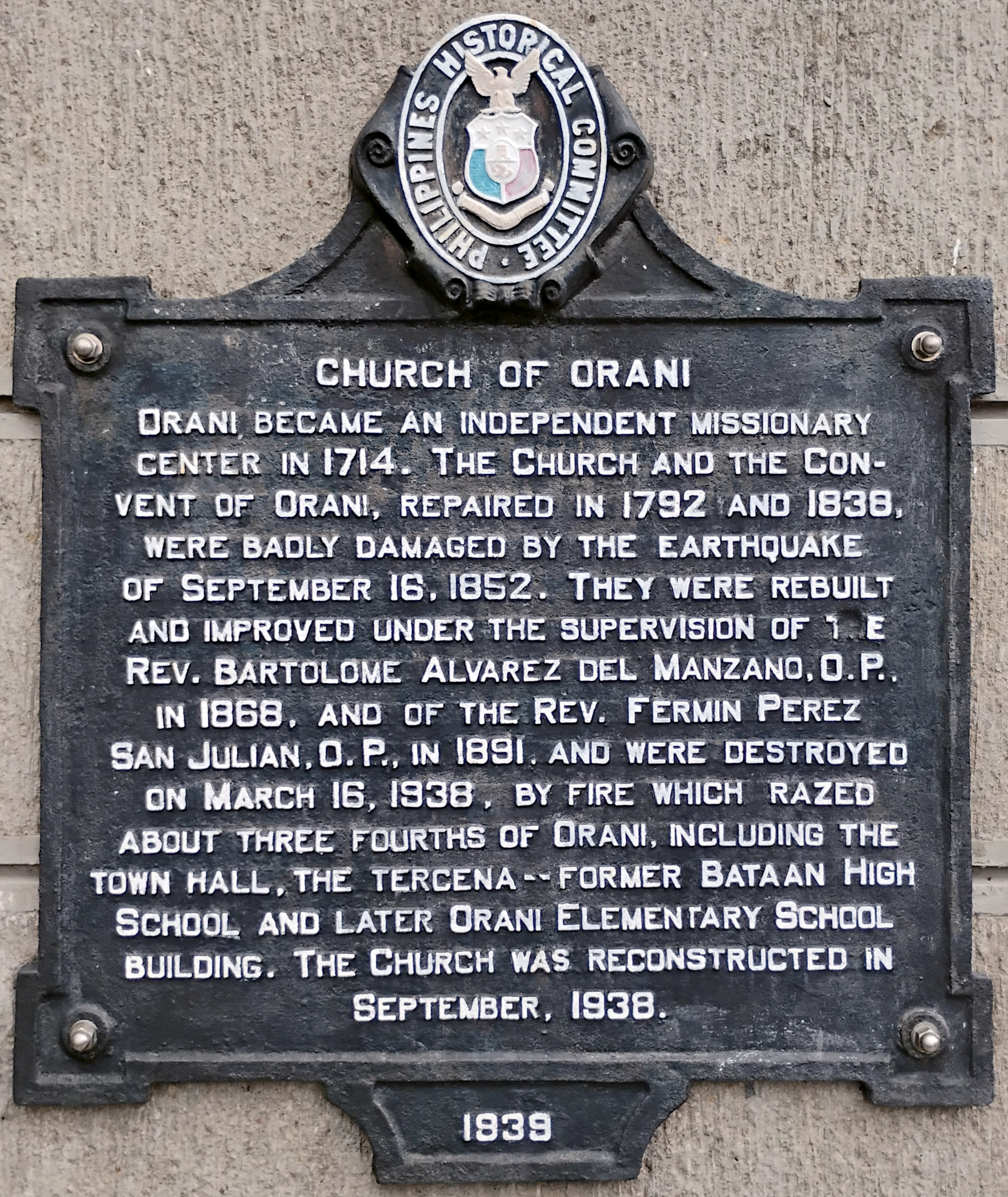
Church PHC historical marker installed in 1939

On April 21, 1714, the "visita" (chapelry) of Orani formally became an independent parish, separating itself from the Parish of Samal. Diego Ortiz was appointed as Orani's first cura párroco. The original structure, made out of nipa leaves and bamboo and constructed on the founding site in the 1600s, was modeled after the primitive types: open on all sides, thatched roofed held by columnar posts of molave wood and equipped with bamboo benches. The chapel was later made bigger and reconstructed with adobe and stone as well as sturdier roofing material. Agustín Manjares y Esquivel renovated the chapel in 1723.

On June 23, 1768, the administration of the Dominican missions in Bataan was transferred to the Secular Clergy. This was due to the refusal of the Dominicans in Bataan to submit their parishes to the inspection and visit of the Archdiocese, then headed by Archbishop Basilio Sancho de Santa Justa y Rufina. In Orani, it was Bernardo de Aragón who turned over the parish to the secular priest Faustino Bautista, who had to sign an inventory of items belonging to the church and the Virgin. In 1806, a small "carillon" (musical instrument housed in the church belfry) was installed. In 1833, the Dominicans returned with the death of Juan de los Reyes with Rafael Castro succeeding as Cura Parroco.

The Dominican friars built and repaired the Orani church and convent in 1792 and 1836, but these were badly damaged by the September 16, 1852, earthquake. From 1868 to 1891, Bartolomé Alvarez del Manzano built and improved the church buildings, which were finished by Fermín Pérez de San Julián. It was also during the terms of these two parish priests that the "visitas" of Balut and Tapulao were built. They were also responsible for the beautification of Orani's Catholic cemetery as well as the construction of a primary school for boys and another, for girls, which were burned down by the Kaptipuneros who also used stones from the cemetery to build a blockade.

During the revolution against Spain, Fermín Pérez de San Julián, was spared from the ire of the Katipuneros by the townspeople, particularly by the people of Tapulao, who kept their spiritual leader from harm. Other parish priests in Bataan were abducted, one was even hanged on a tree by the rebels. Pérez de San Julián together with other priests from Central Luzon, were eventually arrested by the rebels upon the orders of Gen. Emilio Aguinaldo. They were brought to prison camps where they were help captive until June 1899. After the Filipino-American war, Pérez de San Julián went back to Bataan and served as parish priest of Pilar until 1931.

Early in the American colonial period, the priests at Orani organized catechetical instructions for first communicants, youth and adults in order to reinforce the faith of adherents to counter the rise of Protestantism. Assistance in this effort came from the Jesuit seminarians at San Carlos and San Javier Seminaries who would spend their summer break in the town upon the invitation of the parish priest, Pedro Salaverria. He was the administrator of the Hacienda de Dinalupihan of the Archdiocese of Manila. Debates between the Catholics and Protestants were organized in the town plaza.

On March 16, 1938, a fire razed three fourths of Orani, Bataan, including the church, then under the stewardship of Gregorio Florencio, the Presidencia and the Tercena (former Bataan High School and later Orani Elementary School building). The partially damaged image of the Virgen Milagrosa was saved and brought to the Salaverría bahay na bato located beside the church. In September 1938, the Church of Orani was rehabilitated.

On January 6, 1942, Japanese forces bombed Bataan and the church of Orani sustained minimal damages. The religious services were suspended until the liberation of the Philippines because the Japanese used the church as a garrison. According to a report of the mayor during the Japanese Occupation, Raymundo Galicia, the image of the Virgin was left untouched by the Japanese and remained on its altar during the entire Japanese Occupation.

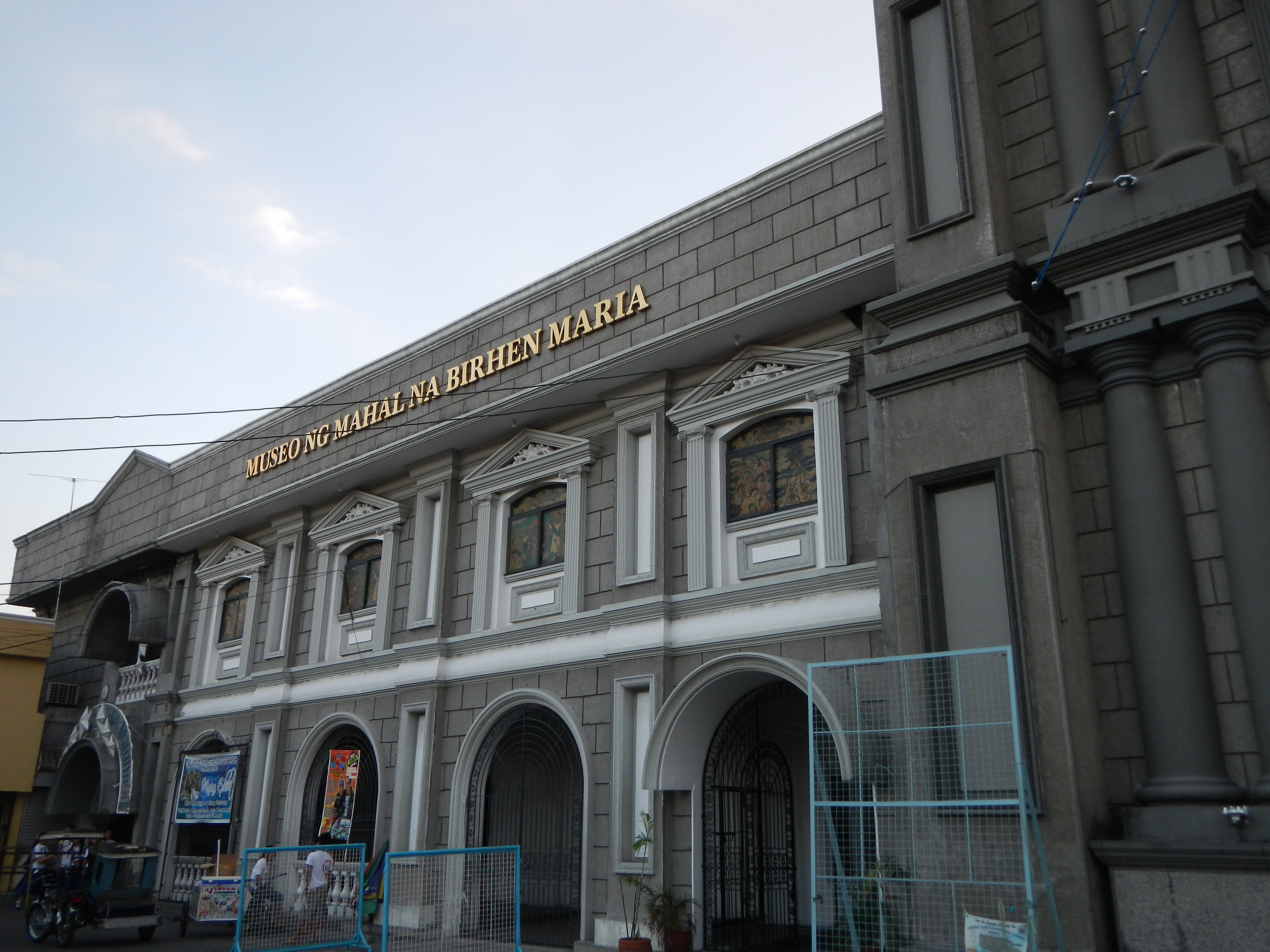
Museo ng Mahal na Birheng Maria

On August 15, 1945, the church was rehabilitated by Elias Calimbas. Later, Simplicio Fernandez and Emilano Santos finished its construction in 1982. The church was renovated from 1987 to October 6, 1991, under Antonio Dumaual and Camilo Pacanza. The new altar was blessed by Bishop Celso N. Guevarra on October 6, 1991. In 2002, the church and convent were repaired and improved.

The "Museo ng Mahal na Birheng Maria", a repository of the Marian relics and artifacts was added to the convent. It is here where the numerous vestments and crowns of the Lady of the Most Holy Rosary are kept.

== Architecture ==
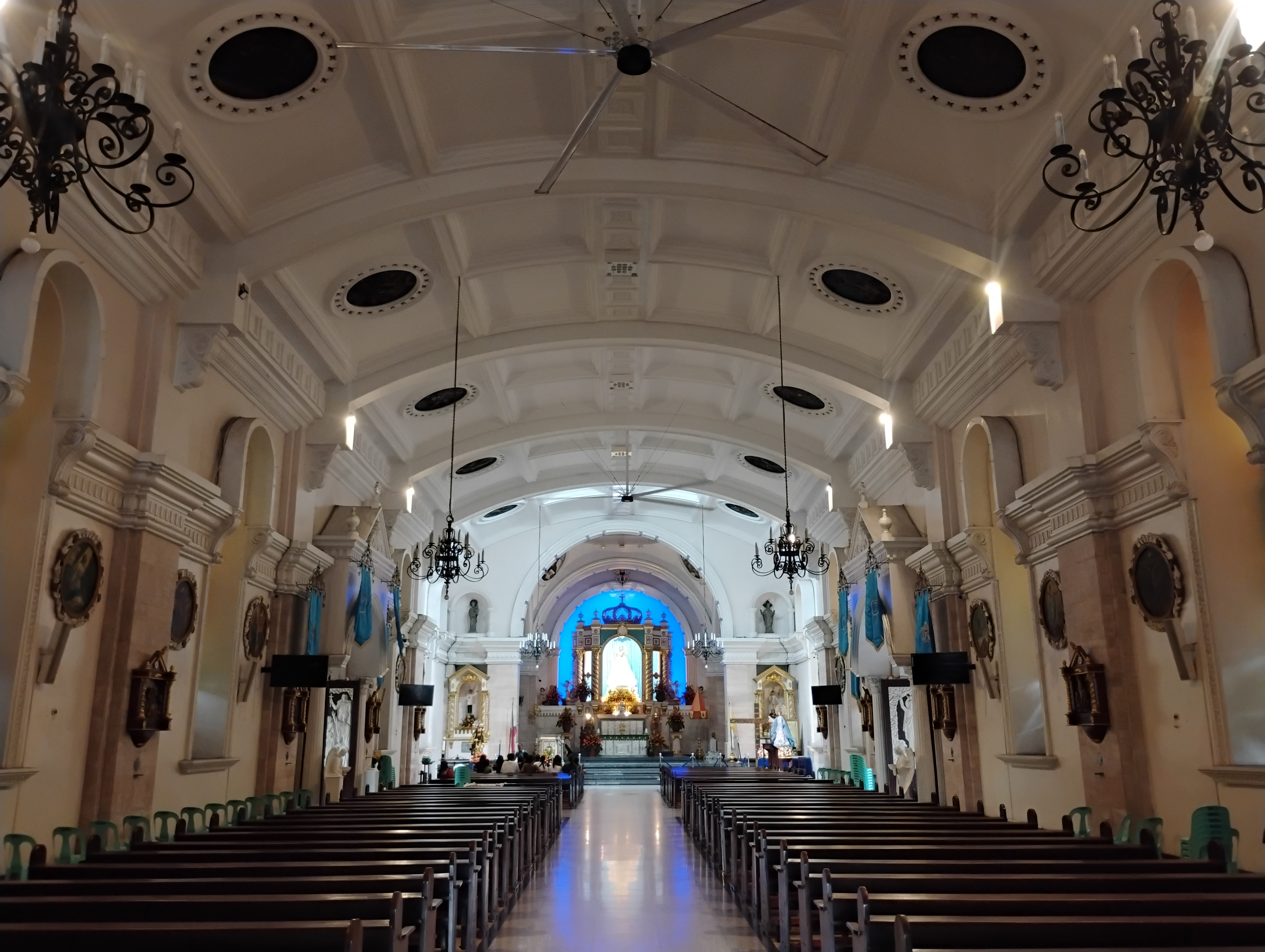
Church interior in 2025

The Orani church is an example of a mixture of old and new architecture. Although the church was drastically restructured and changed in the late 1980s and early 1990s, it still maintains the same lines and design of the old façade albeit with a different finish. The ceiling was heightened, the tile flooring changed to marble and the upper side windows demolished to give way to modern stained glass artwork despite the church's original Baroque and Neoclassic theme. The church has four portals: the Gate of Heaven, the Gate of Saints, the Gate of Angels and the Gate of Paradise. The former Neoclassic altar, which was demolished in the late 1980s, has become the inspiration for the current altar which was built and blessed in 2012 under the administration of Santos Detablan. Brick tile flooring was installed in the church patio.

=== "Ang Batingaw ng Orani (1806)" ===
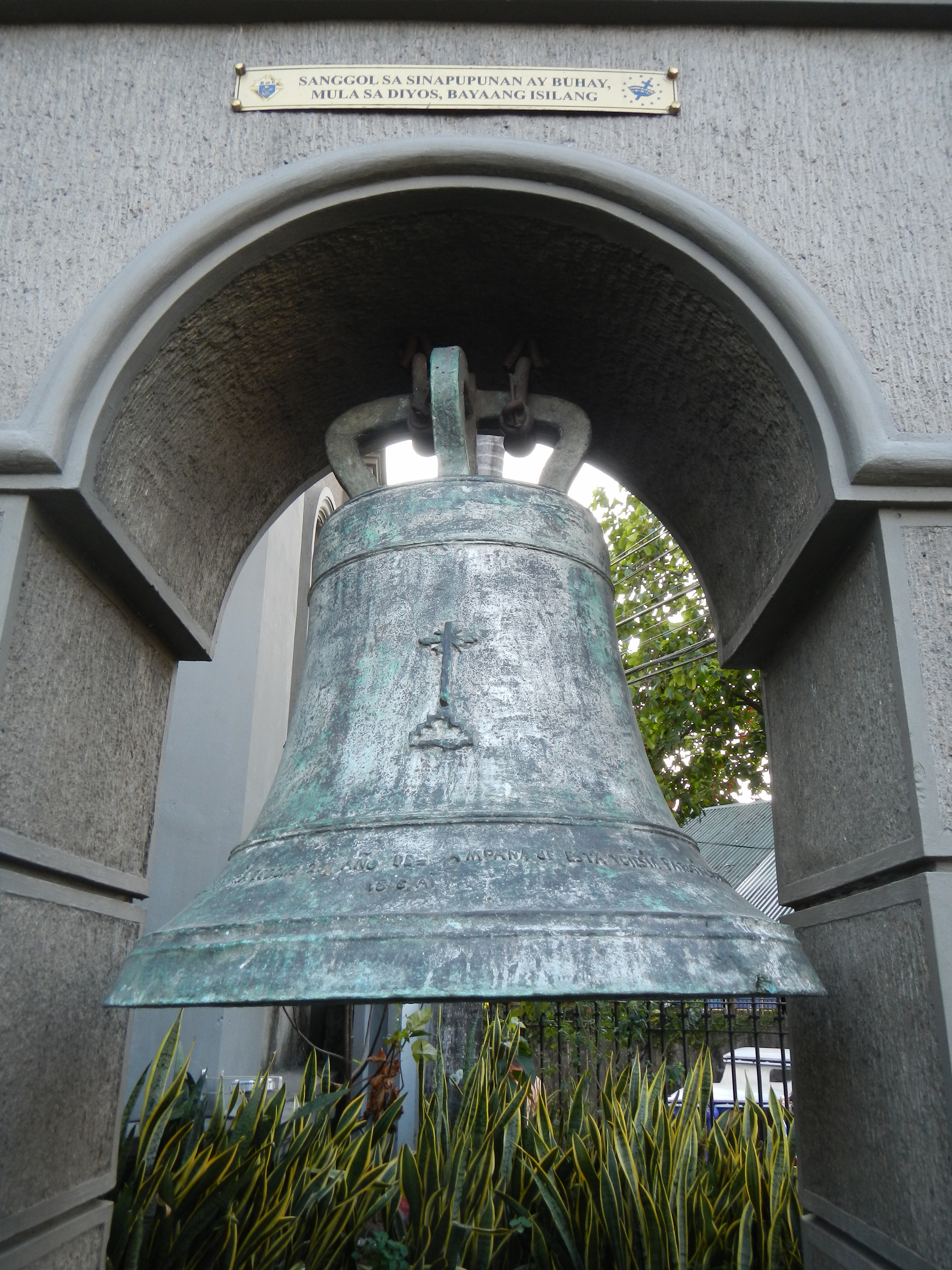
1806 Heritage bell of Orani

The historic bell of the church of the parish of the Nuestra Señora del Rosario was presented to the public and installed in front of the church on June 7, 1998. It is a symbol of the undying, truthful and timeless faith of the people of Orani to the Lord.

Displayed in front of the church, the bell is another historical and religious artifact that symbolizes the birth and lasting legacy of Christianity in the province.

The heritage bells were dedicated and first used during the tenure of parish priests Juan José de Acuña and Esteban de Sta. María in 1806.

== Honors ==
In 1939, the Philippines Historical Committee installed a historical marker at the façade of the Church of Orani, classifying it as a house of worship with level II status.

On April 18, 2009, the 50th Golden Anniversary of the Virgin's canonical coronation was celebrated with the presence of Archbishop of Manila Gaudencio Cardinal Rosales [Source: Parish Priest and Parish Office of Orani, Bataan, retrieved on January 16, 2013].

The Nuestra Señora del Santo Rosario de Orani Church was declared a "Dambana ng Paglalakbay" (Pilgrim Shrine) on August 22, 2004, by then Bishop of Balanga and now Archbishop of Lingayen-Dagupan Socrates Villegas.

On September 25, 2012, the church of Orani also became an affiliate church of the Basilica of St. Mary Major in Rome, with all the rights and privileges conveyed on the latter. This means that the faithful, after fulfilling the standard conditions, can avail themselves of a plenary indulgences when they pray at the Church as if they had visited the Basilica in Rome.

In September 2019, it was declared a minor basilica by Pope Francis and was solemnly declared as such on December 12 in a Mass presided by Archbishop of San Fernando, Pampanga Florentino Lavarias (the future sede vacante Apostolic Administrator of Balanga upon Ruperto Santos stepped down as fourth Bishop of Balanga four years later on July 22, 2023 until Rufino Sescon became the diocese's fifth bishop on March 1, 2025) as main celebrant, with other celebrants are bishops Santos, Victor Ocampo (Gumaca), Enrique Macaraeg (Tarlac), Dennis Villarojo (Bulacan and Valenzuela) and Fidelis Layug (Auxiliary Bishop of Lingayen–Dagupan), first counselor at the Apostolic Nunciature to the Philippines Monsignor Julian Kabore, rector and parish priest Fr. Abraham SP. Pantig, and other priests of the Diocese of Balanga. At the ceremony is where the basilica logo and Santos' coat of arms as then-diocese's bishop were placed along the church's floor near the altar, umbraculum having coats of arms of the Philippines, the diocese and its said bishop by the time of declaration and Philippine and Vatican City/Holy See flags, and of Pope Francis outside aside from the elements mentioned before added to the church.

== Rectors and Parish Priests ==
=== Archdiocese of Manila era (February 6, 1579 – December 11, 1948) ===
- Rev. Fr. Bartolome Alvarez del Manzano
- Rev. Fr. Fermin Perez San Julian

=== Diocese of Balanga era (November 8, 1975 – present) ===
- Rev. Msgr. Emilliano Santos
- Rev. Msgr. Antonio S. Dumaual
- Rev. Fr. Camilo Pacanza
- Rev. Msgr. Victor Ocampo (August 4, 2002 – October 22, 2005)

==== During the 6-years term of the diocese (October 22, 2005 – present) ====
- 2005–2011: Rev. Msgr. Victor Ocampo (October 22, 2005 – 2007)
- 2011–2017: Rev. Fr. Santos S. Detablan (June 5, 2011 – June 5, 2017)
- 2017–2023: Rev. Fr. Abraham SP. Pantig (June 5, 2017 – June 5, 2023)
- 2023–present: Rev. Fr. Antonio "Tony" M. Quintos Jr. (June 5, 2023 – present)

== Gallery ==
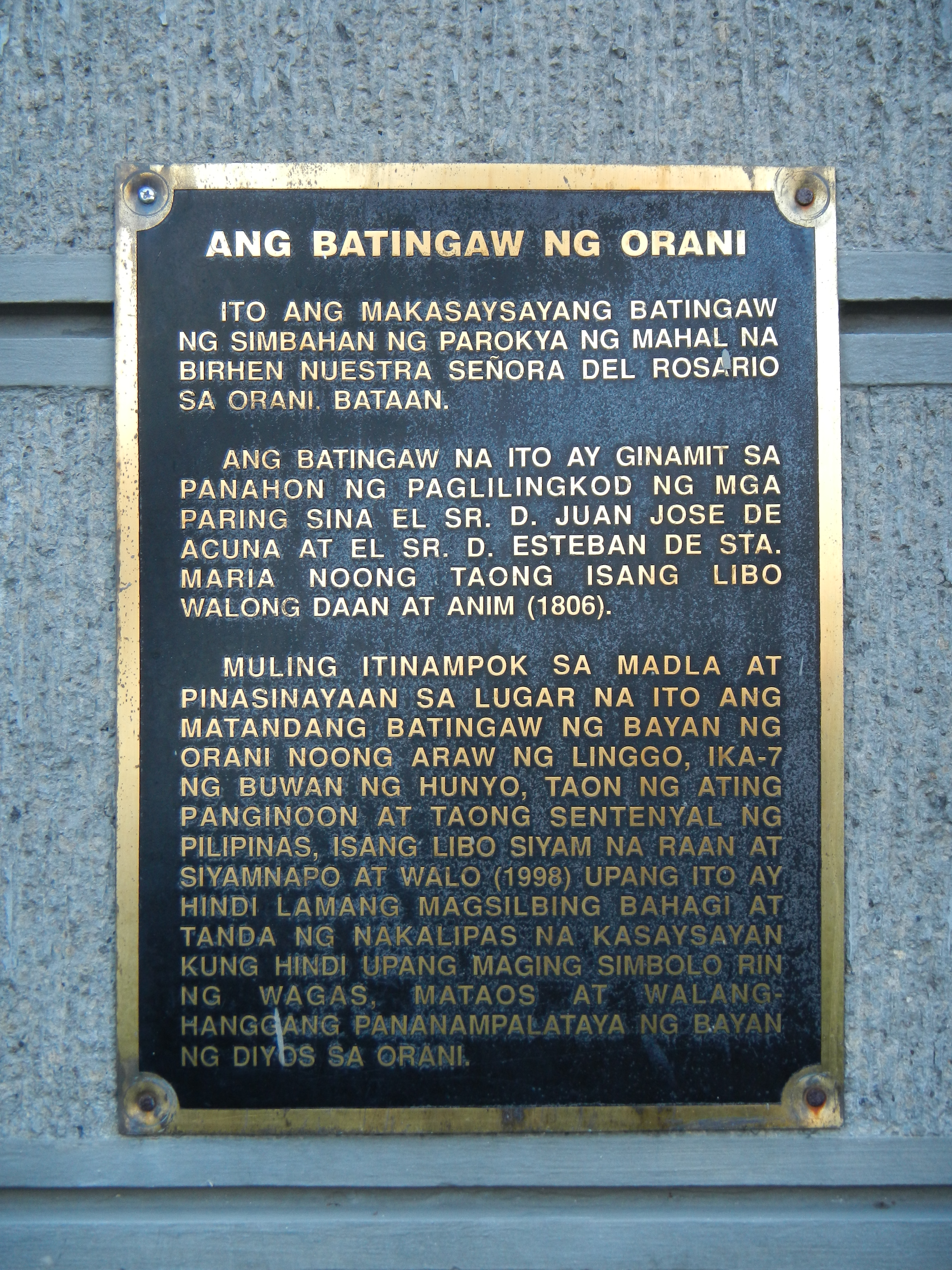
The Bells marker

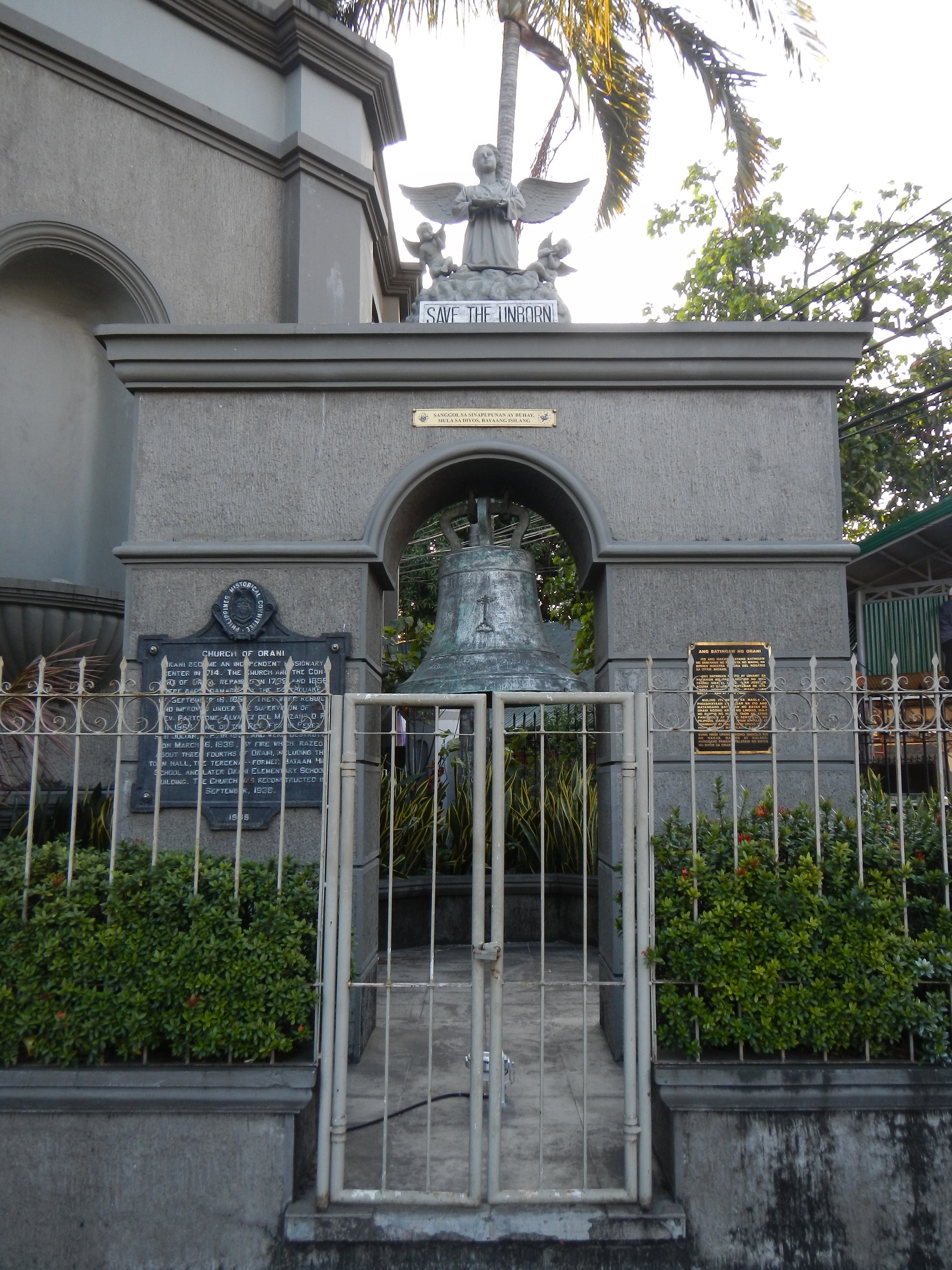
The fenced bell

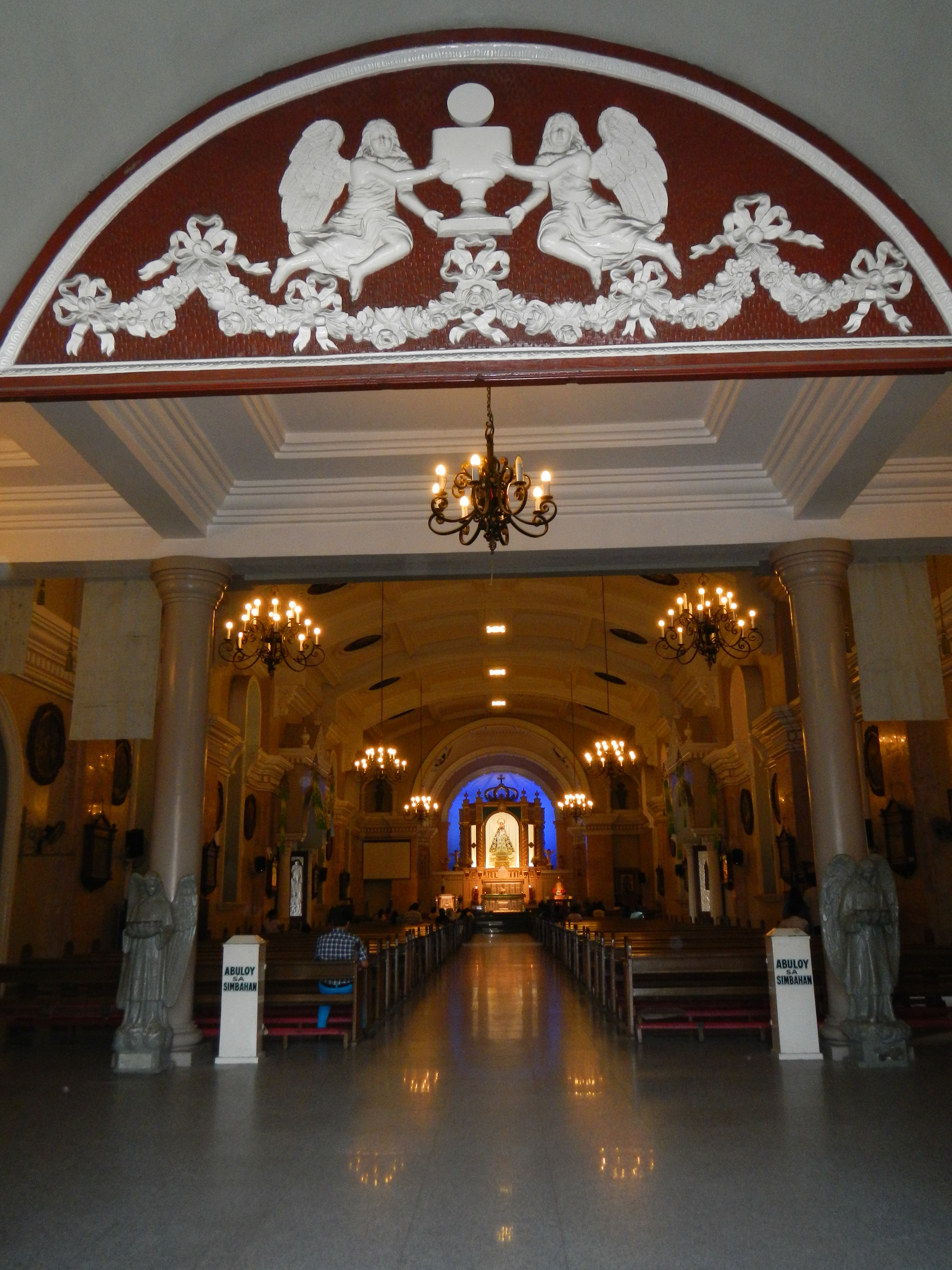
Entrance, main door

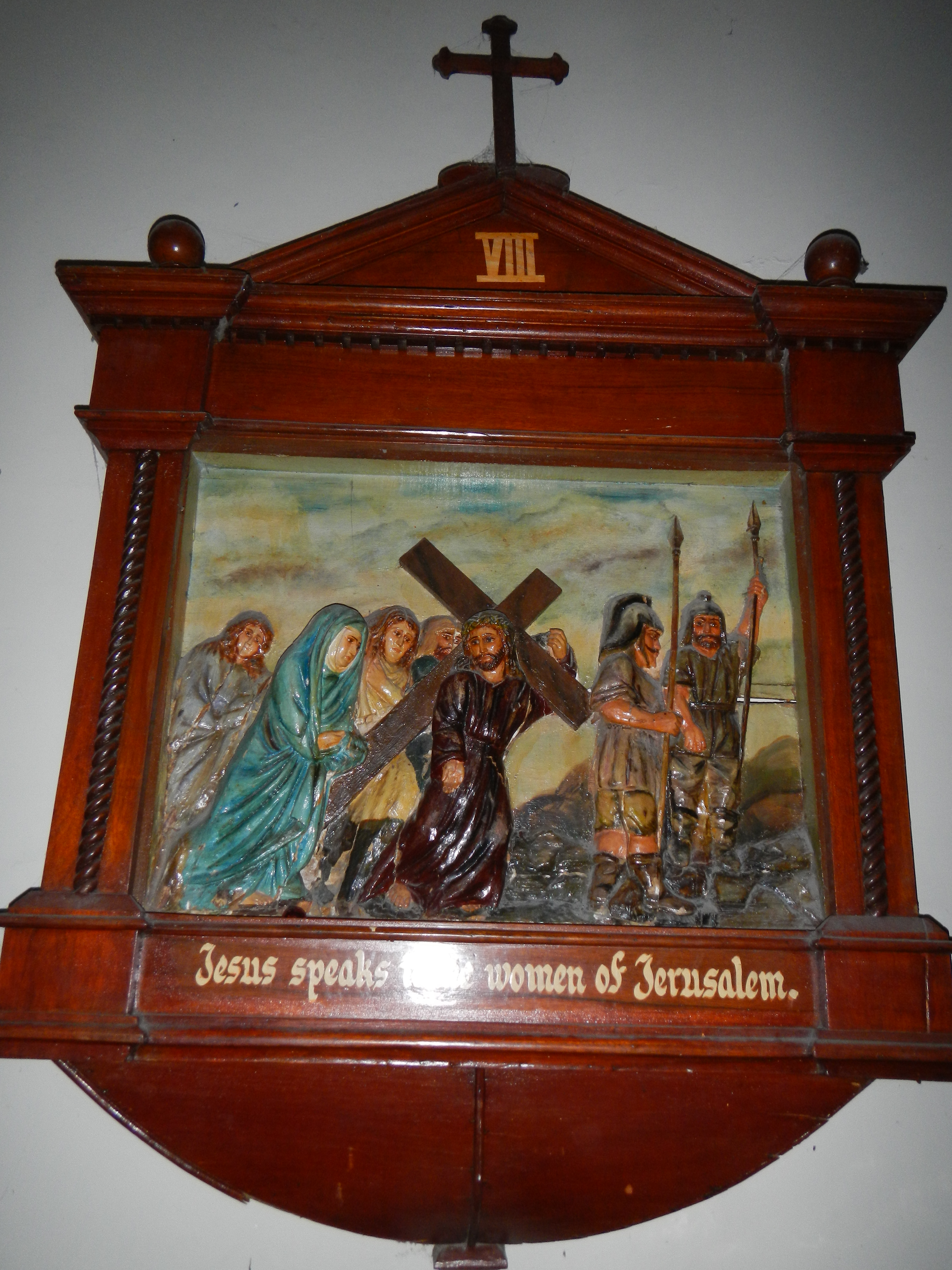
Station of the Cross

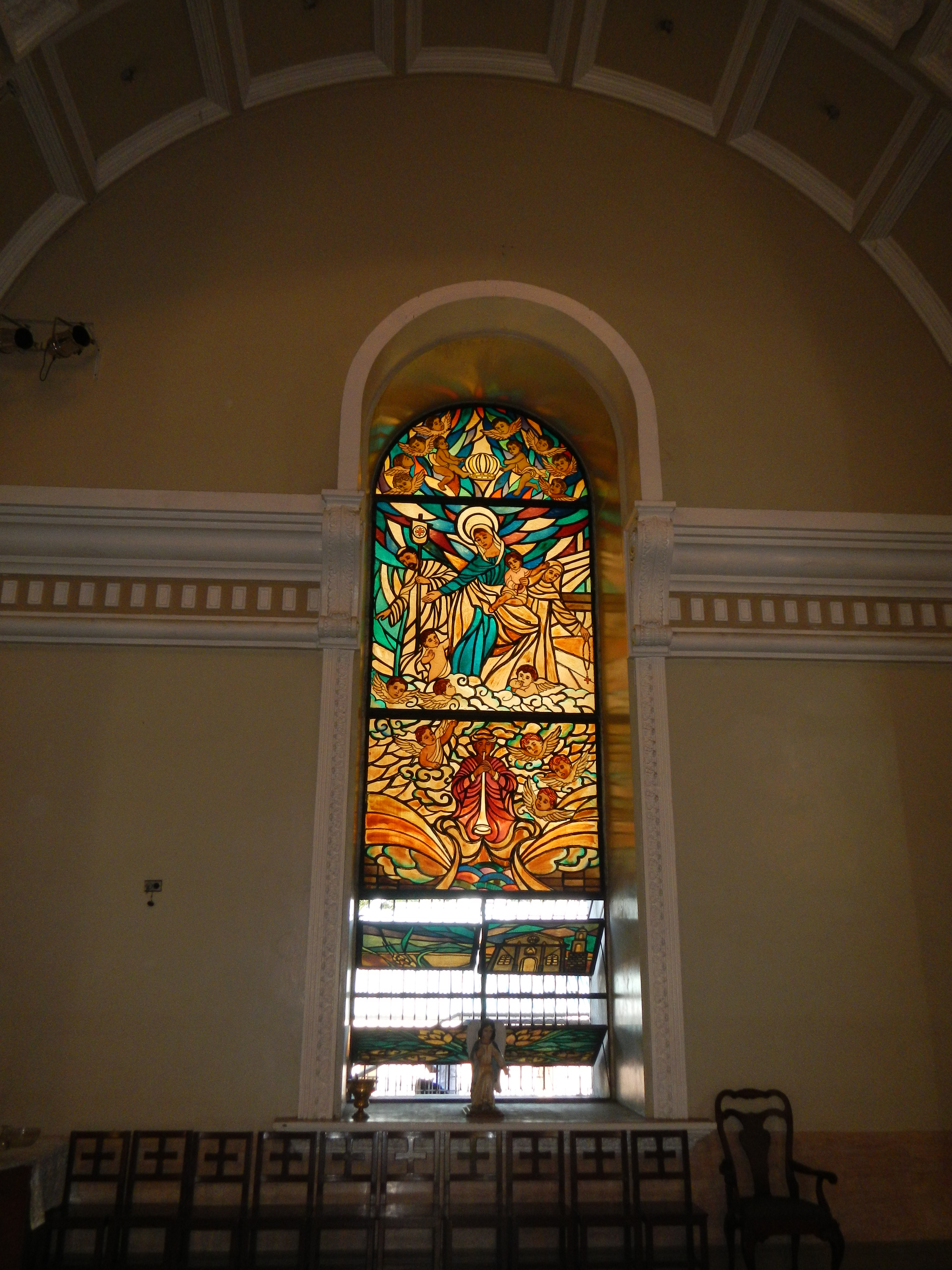
Stained glass window

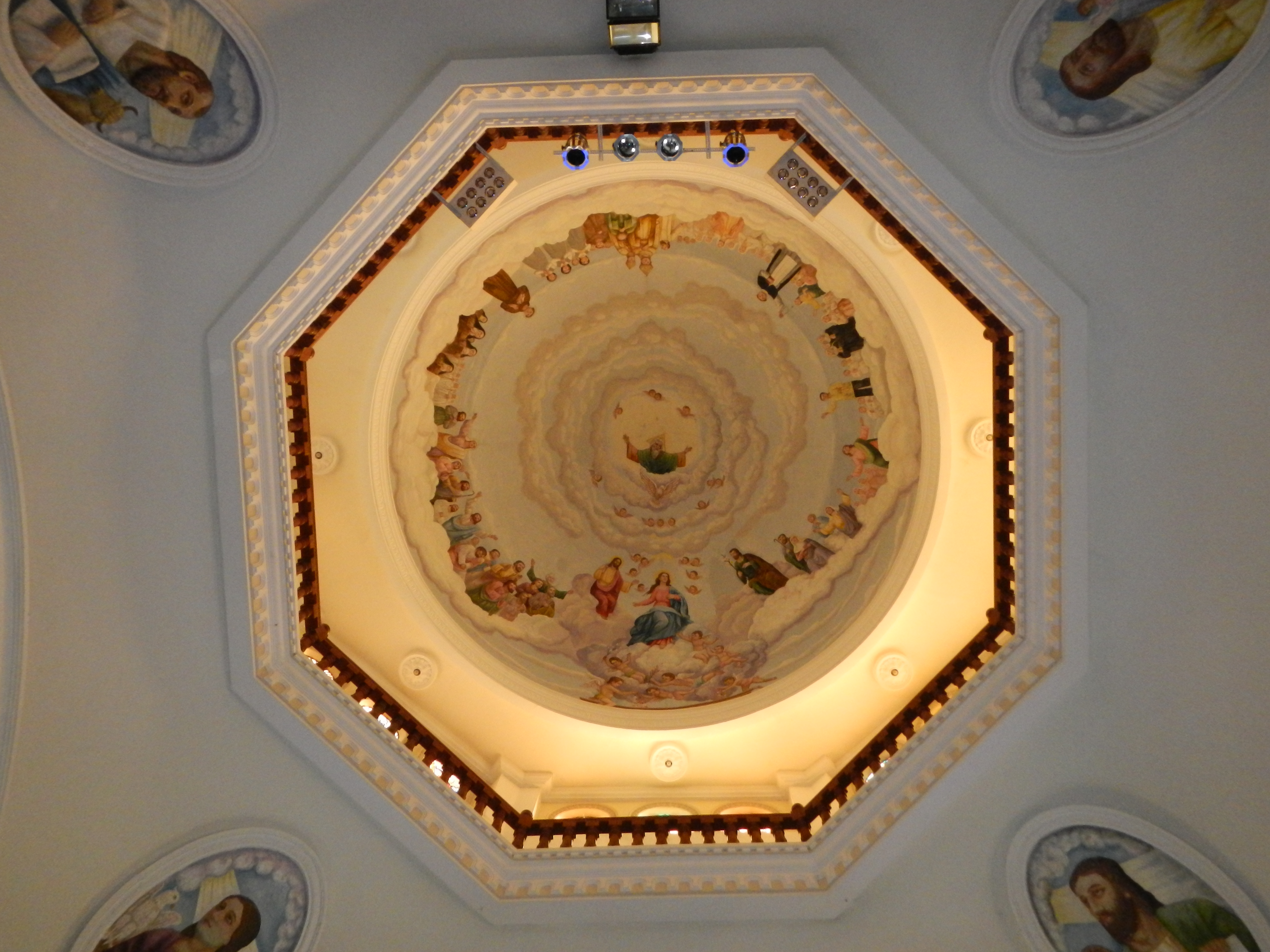
Dome

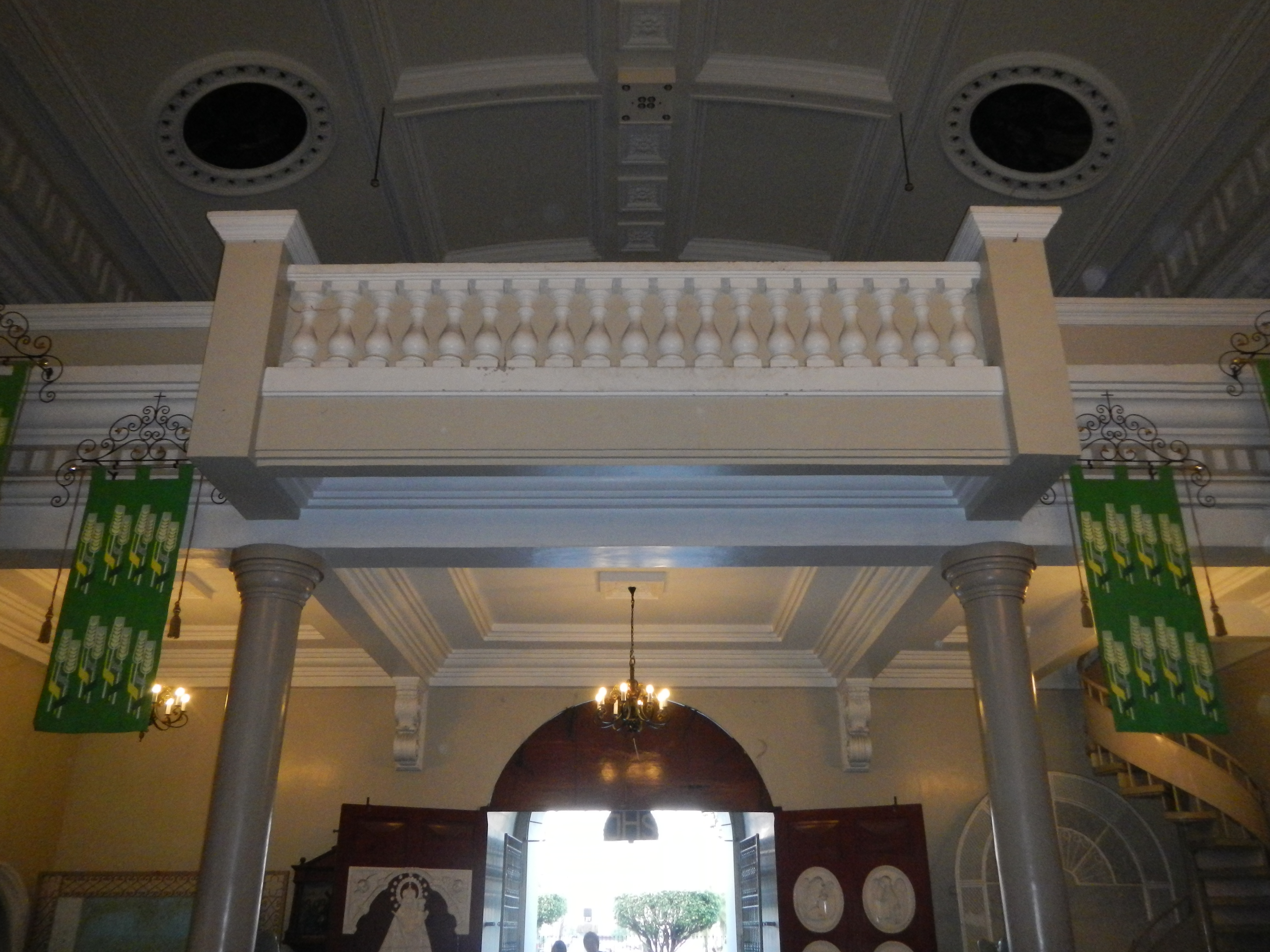
Choir loft

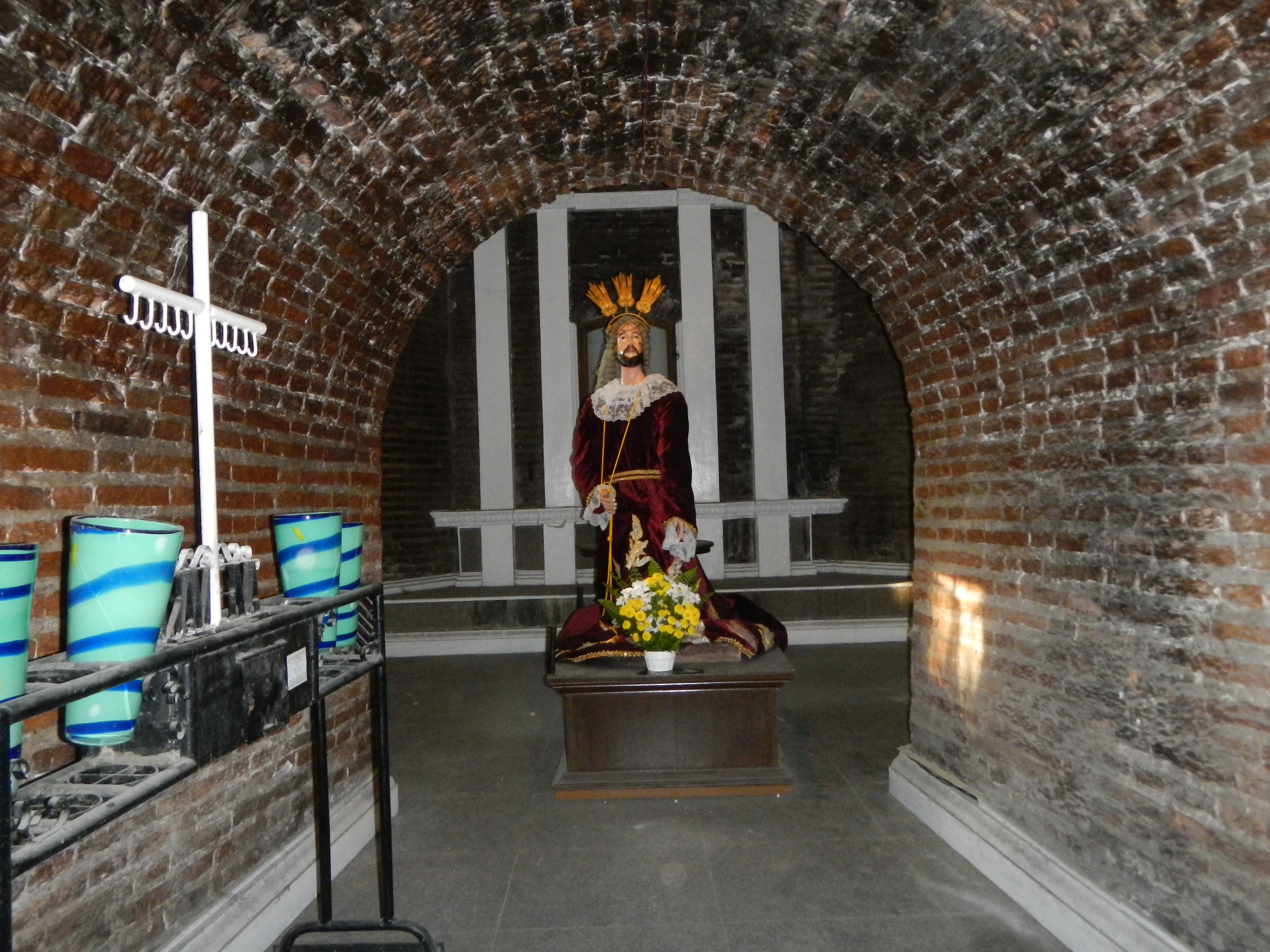
"Santong Gapos"

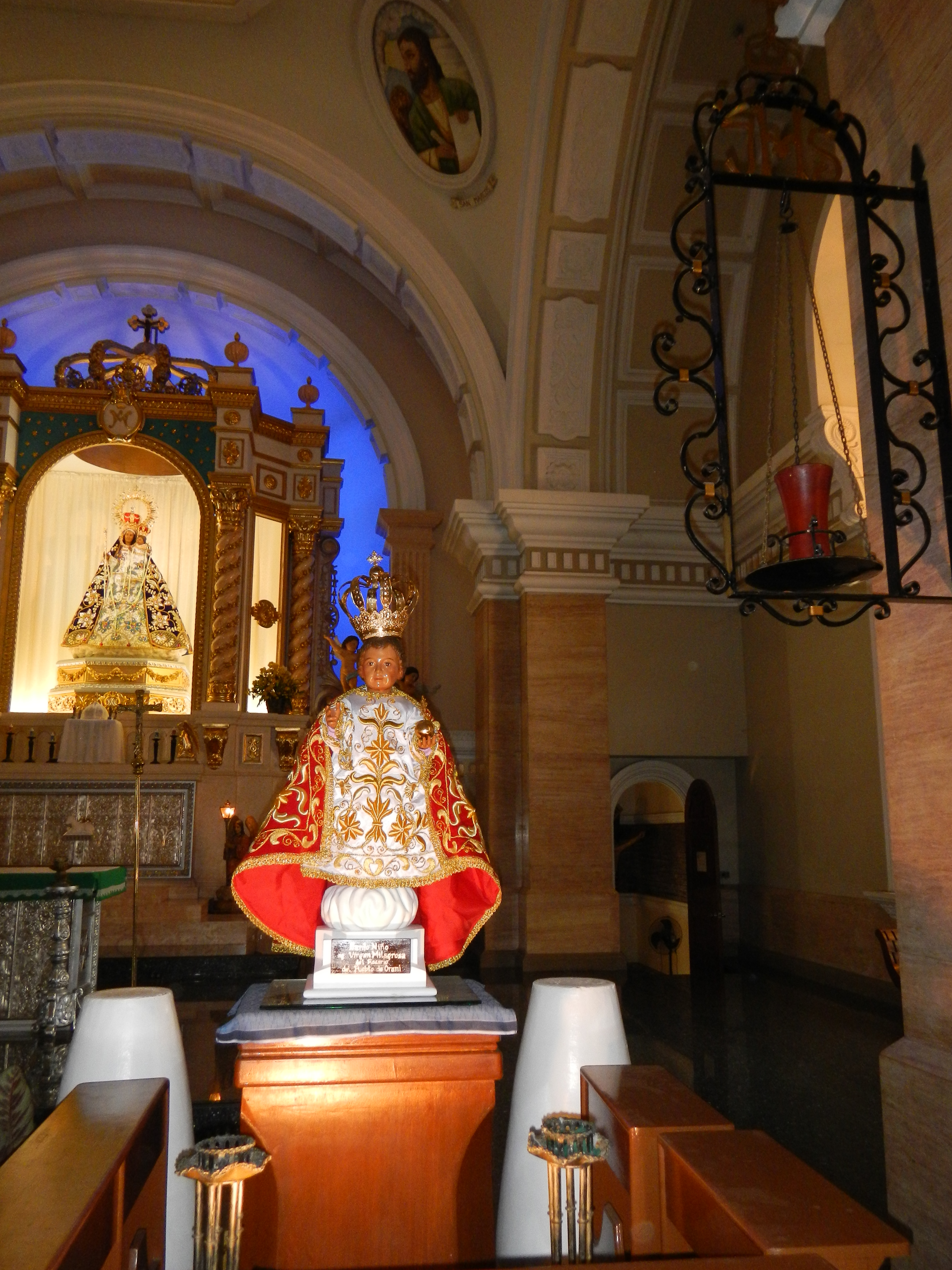
Santo Nino

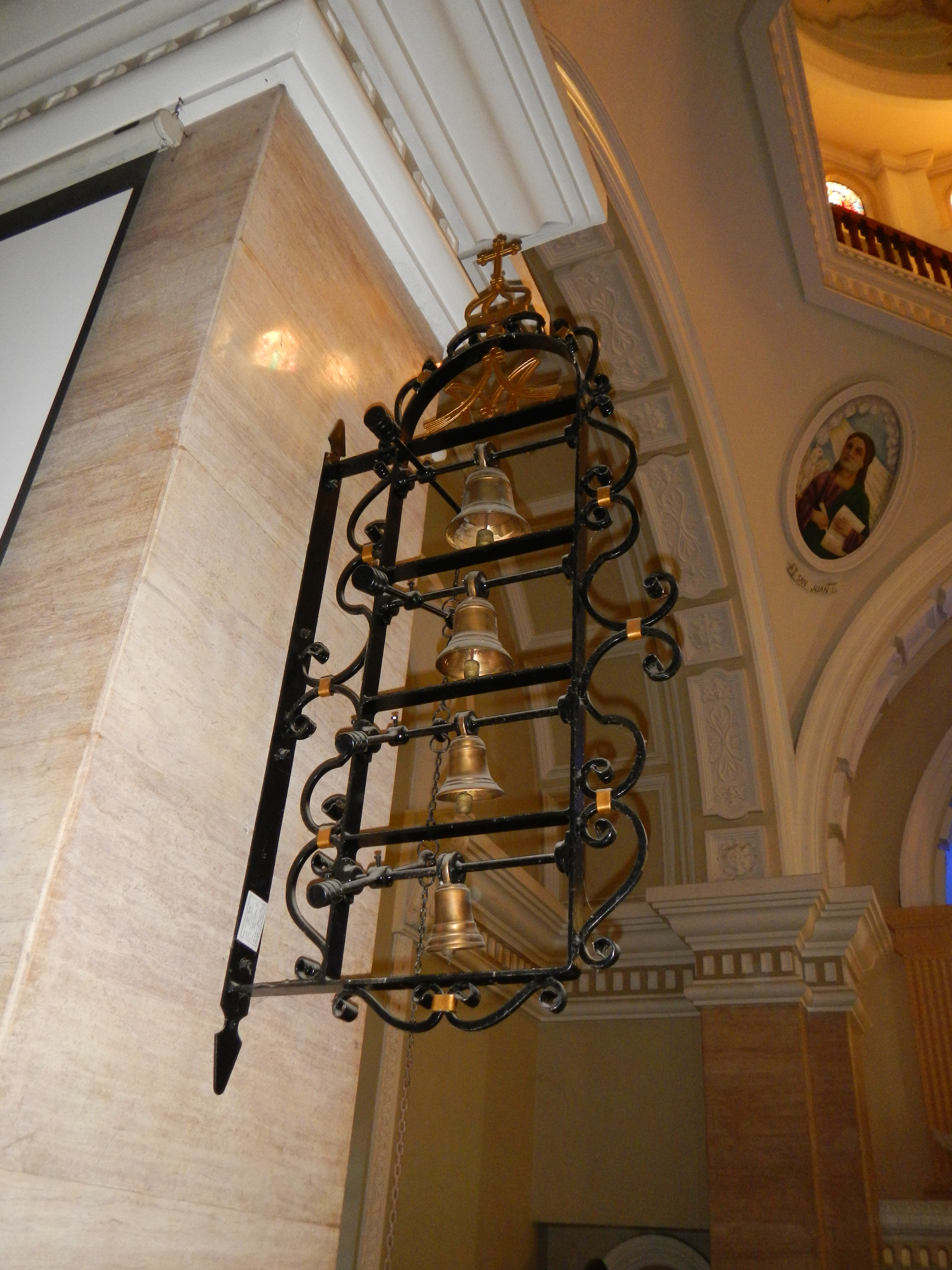
Holy Mass bells

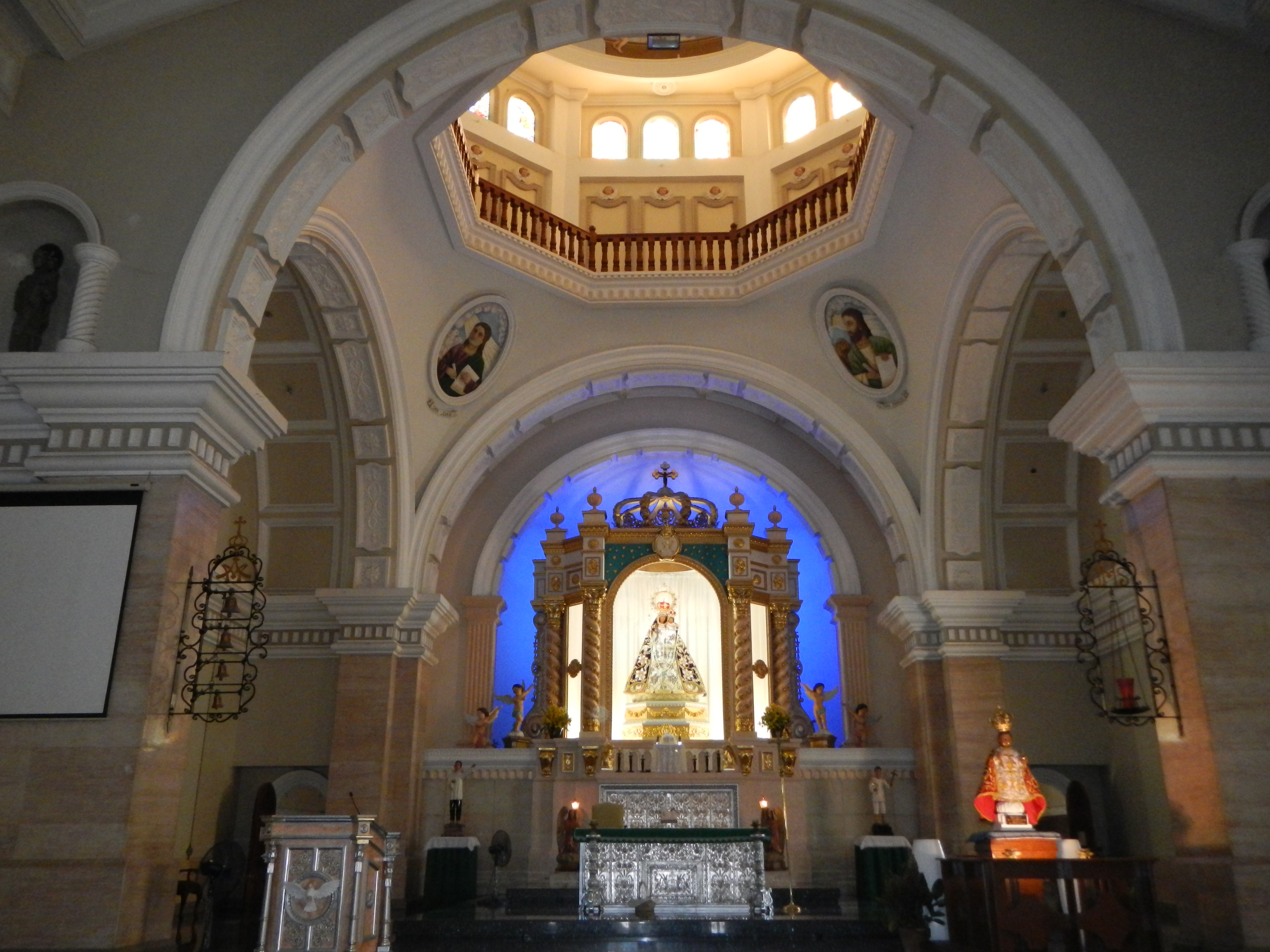
Sanctuary

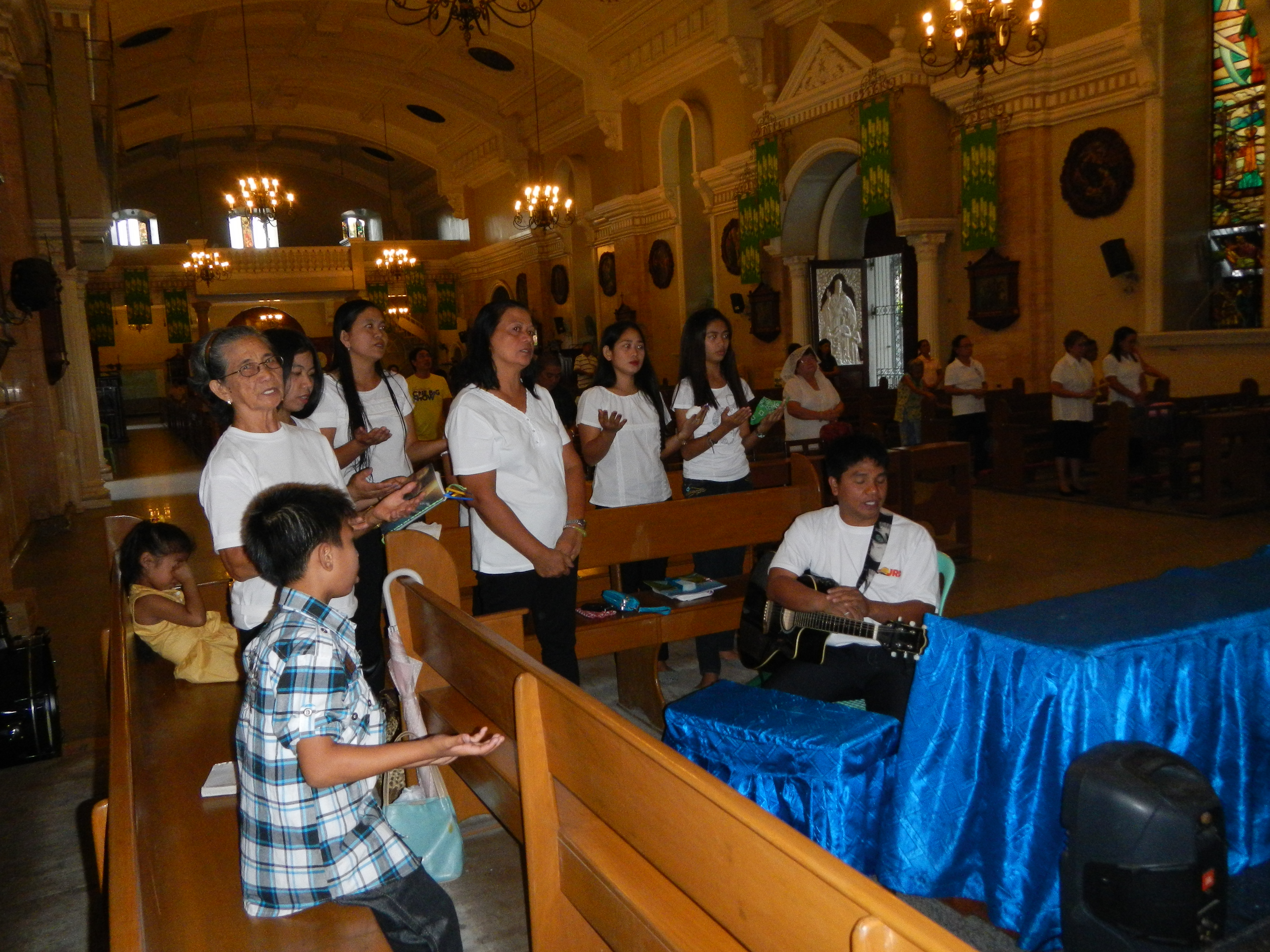
Orani Parish choir

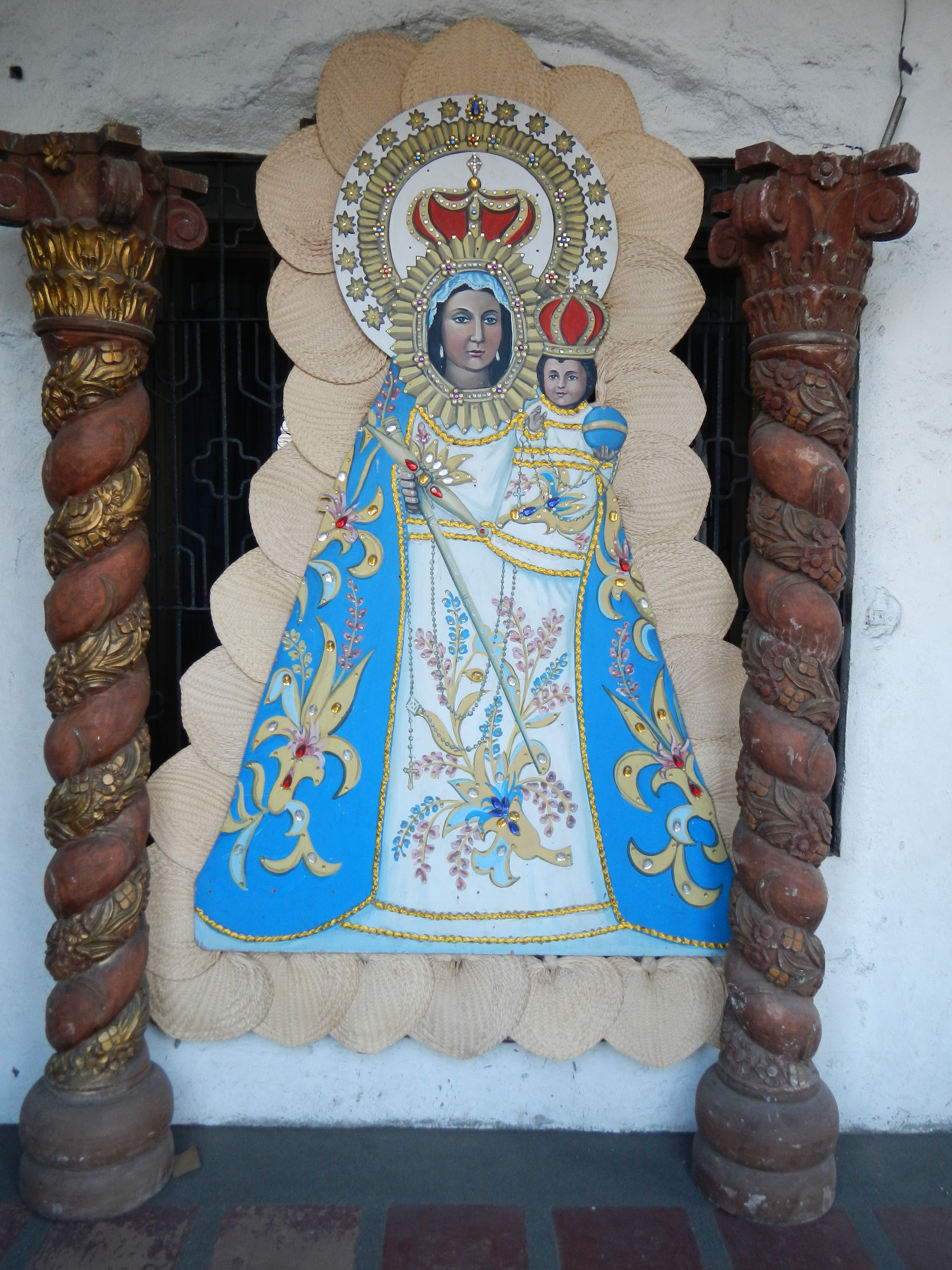
Our Lady of the Holy Rosary, Parish Office entrance

== See also ==
- Catholic Church in the Philippines
- Diocese of Balanga
- Balanga Cathedral
- Our Lady of Orani
