= Our Lady of Orani =

Marian apparition in the Philippines

Our Lady of the Rosary of Orani Nuestra Señora Virgen Milagrosa del Santísimo Rosario el Pueblo de Orani Birhen ng Santo Rosaryo ng Orani
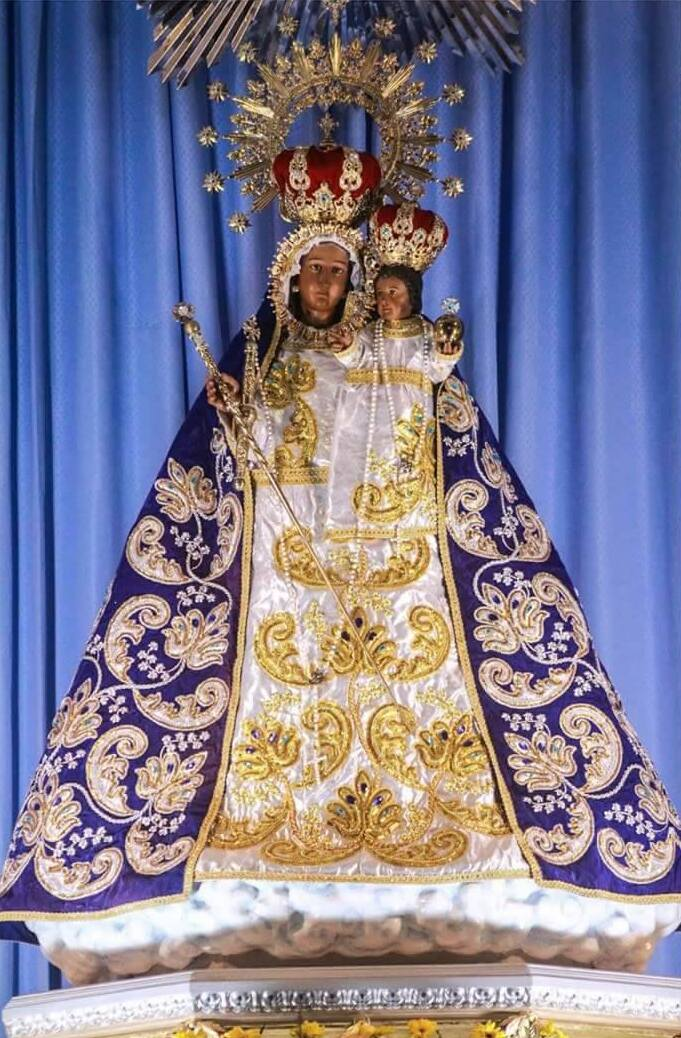
- The image as enshrined
- Location: Orani, Bataan; Philippines
- Date: 1718
- Witness: the people of Samal and Orani
- Type: Marian apparition
- Approval: Pope Pius XII
- Shrine: Orani Church, Orani, Bataan; Philippines

The Our Lady of the Rosary of Orani, or simply Our Lady of Orani, refers to the image enshrined at the Minor Basilica and Shrine Parish of Our Lady of the Rosary of Orani. Her feast day is October 13.

== History ==
The Spanish Dominican friars arrived in the province of Bataan (then known as the Partido de Bataan and considered part of Pampanga) in 1587 and founded the parish of Abucay on June 10, 1588, placing it under the patronage of Domingo de Guzman, the founder of the Order of Preachers or the Dominican Order. The Dominican frailes brought with them the miraculous image of Nuestra Señora del Rosario, a custom followed by the Dominican Order in all of their new missions in keeping with their calling to promote the devotion to the Holy Rosary.

As to the origin of the image of the Virgen Milagrosa, there are some theories which claim that the statue originated from Spain (on board the galleons that transported soldiers and the frailes from Spain to the New World). Nevertheless, considering the length and difficulty of the voyage from the Mother Country to the Philippines, as well as the precious space on board the galleons, bringing an image so large would simply have been impractical. Another theory states that it came from Mexico, just like the image of Nuestra Senora dela Paz y Bien Viaje, whose presence during the Dominicans missionaries' first voyage to the Philippines in 1587 was recorded by the frailes. The fact that the Orani image was not mentioned at all is highly indicative that it was not on the same journey. Claims that it came on a later journey, however, would clash with accounts by the Dominicans that it was brought to Bataan in 1587. Still, others claim that it was made in the Philippines, sometime between July 1587 and June 1588, just in time for the formal establishment of the Parish of Abucay. An analysis of the technique and rendition of the image's features may indicate a Philippine provenance. Elements such as the suksok (a carved and stylistic rendition of the mantle, tucked into the waist at the back) confirms this theory, aside from the features on the Virgin's face. Furthermore, at that time, there were already many able artisans (mostly Chinese) in Manila and its environs who could carve religious images after being taught by the religious orders that arrived first in the Philippines. The abundance of talented sculptors was noted by the Dominican Bishop of Manila (the first in the country), Domingo de Salazar, when he wrote King Philip II of Spain in 1590. Most of these artisans were Sangleys (Chinese) living in the Parián, an enclave of Manila also administered by the Dominicans.

On December 11, 1965, an article written by Oscar R. Landicho was published in the Chronicle magazine claiming that the Virgen Milagrosa was made by a "Greek" slave named Pere Morey in 1360. According to the article, Pere Morey was the father of Pere Oller and Pere Johan. To set the record straight, Pere Morey was not from Greece but was a subject of the Kingdom of Aragón (which would later become the Kingdom of Spain after its unification with the Kingdom of Castille in the 15th century). Morey was active in the island of Mallorca (then part of the Kingdom of Aragón) as a master mason (stonecutter) as well as an architect, and worked in the construction of various churches. Second, he was not related to Pere Oller and Pere Johan who were Gothic-style sculptors in the region of Catalunya. The writer may have been misled by the common name Pere (Pedro) which was not a surname or a family name but rather a first name. Pere Morey himself lived during the Gothic period of architecture and sculpture in Europe so to attribute to him a Baroque image like the Virgen Milagrosa of Orani would be something hard, if not impossible, to explain. Even in the remotest chance that the Virgen Milagrosa of Orani was made in 1360, it would be highly improbable that its devotees would have allowed the Dominican missionaries to take away to a distant land an image that would already have been more than 200 years old at that time (in the 1580s). Pere Morey is not to be confused with Pere Morey Servera, an award-winning Catalan writer born in 1941 and who is still active to this day.

Orani prospered as a town and its population subsequently increased. Alongside this development, the devotion to the Virgin of the Rosary grew so fast that at that time, she was already being called "la Virgen Milagrosa" or the Miraculous Virgin, due to her numerous miracles which drew thousands of pilgrims from nearby provinces such as Bulacan, Pampanga and Zamabales. This exponential growth eventually led to the establishment of Orani as an independent parish or Vicaría on April 21, 1714.

In recognition of the widespread devotion to the Virgen Milagrosa of Orani, Pope Pius XII approved on October 7, 1958, the canonical coronation of the image. The actual coronation would take place on April 18, 1959, in a solemn ceremony led by the Archbishop of San Fernando, Emilio Cinense, and the Papal Nuncio to the Philippines, Salvatore Sino.

=== Duplicate image ===
In 1965, six years after the canonical coronation of the Virgen Milagrosa, Joaquin Mayoralgo, a native of Orani, approached the then parish priest, Emiliano Santos, claiming that he had the "original" image of the Virgen (i.e., the one that was brought by the Spaniards to Bataan) in his possession. When asked by Santos how the image came into his possession, Mayoralgo claimed that he bought the image in an antique shop in Manila that had allegedly acquired it from an American G.I. who, in turn, supposedly found it floating in a river in Cavite in the 1940s. According to the claim, the G.I. was returning to the United States, so he decided to get money to finance his trip by selling the image to the antique shop. Mayoralgo wanted Santos to exchange the image he bought from the antique shop for the canonically crowned Image enshrined in the parish church, which he wanted to bring home. Santos refused to surrender the image in the church to Mayoralgo, defending its antiquity and authenticity, but in order to appease Mayoralgo, allowed him to use this 1965 image as the official replica of the one enshrined at church. Mayoralgo decided to crown his image in 1965 (using the 1959 coronation regalia) and have a chapel built in the barrio of Silahis to enshrine his image, which he continued to claim as the original. He also had a novena (without the required Nihil Obstat and Imprimatur) printed and distributed, wherein he expressed the same claims. To date, the diocese has not and does not recognize his claims while maintaining the authenticity of the canonically crowned image in the parish church. The diocese, however, allows the veneration of the image of Silahis in its chapel as an expression of the people's piety towards the Virgin.

== Description ==
The life-sized image measuring one "estadio" or 1.68 m, the image of the Virgen Milagrosa is a traditional Baroque rendition of the Mother and Child, in particular, that of Our Lady of the Rosary. The statue is made out of wood, fully sculpted in the round, including the clothes, although she is dressed in real vestments donated by her devotees, following a tradition of vesting images of saints in Spain and the New World that continues to this day. The Virgin carries the Child Jesus with her left arm and, instead of the usual rosary in the right arm, she holds a cane or walking stick (bastón) as well as a scepter, while a rosary hangs around her neck. The Christ Child holds a globe in His left hand while extending His right arm in a blessing. Rosaries hang from the necks of both Mother and Child following the way the Spanish Dominican missionaries wore the rosary and following a custom of the faithful in Spain and her colonies at the time, in order to gain special indulgences. She is garbed with a blue mantle that extends from her back and is tucked in her waist and wears a white robe that was originally red but was repainted at a later date. A white veil covers her head in the manner of Jewish women at the time of Jesus.

Considering its large size, the image could be considered rare for that time. Some historians opine that it was intentionally made big to commemorate an important event or milestone, such as the founding of the Dominican mission in Bataan, the first outside Manila for the Dominicans. The size could also indicate that the image was meant to be enshrined at a church altar, hence its dimensions.

== Miracles ==
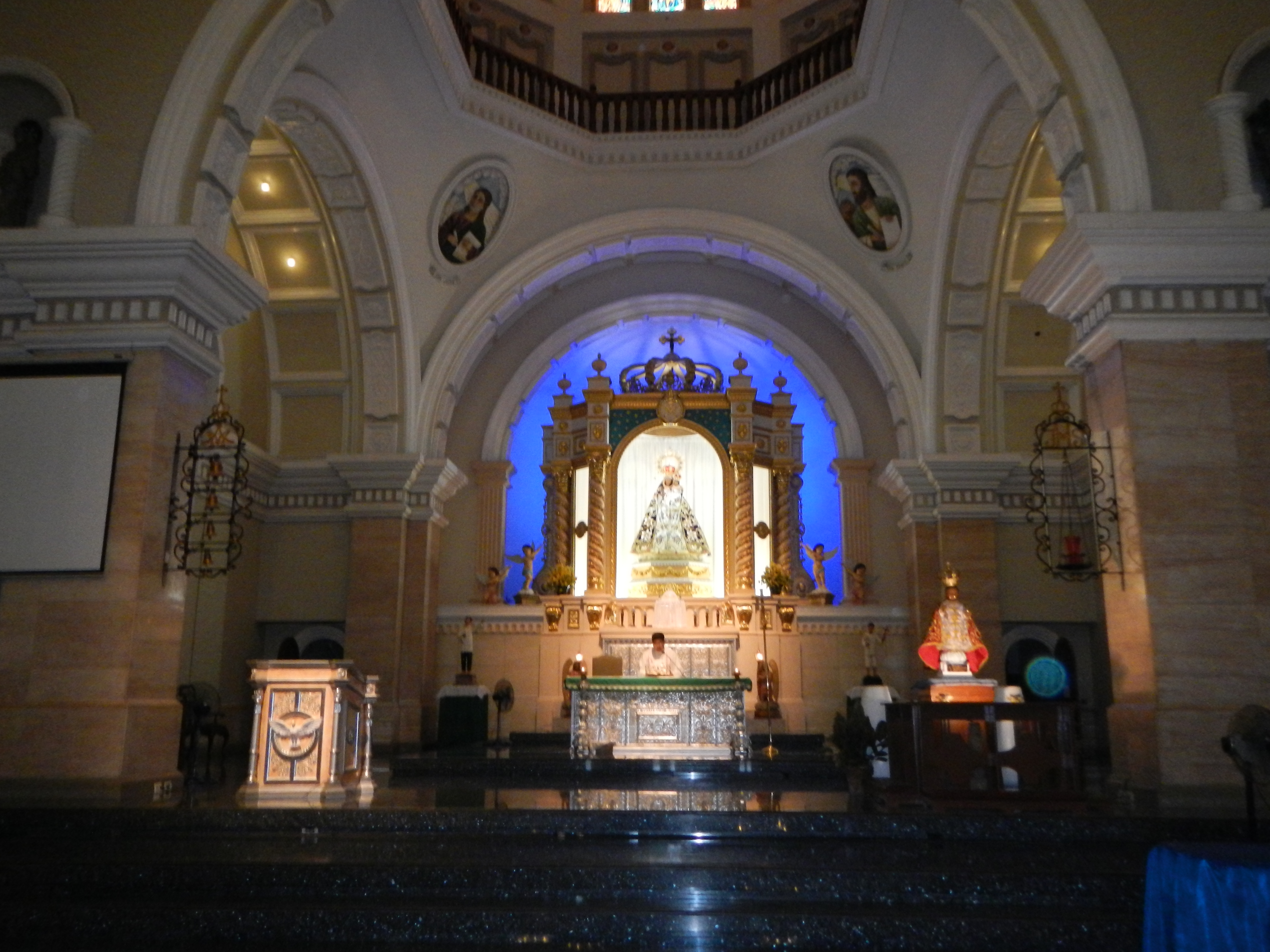
Holy Mass (Orani Church sanctuary, a blue orb is photographed beside the Santo Niño)

In 1596, the Dominican friars established the "visita" of Samal, under the parish of Abucay and transferred the image thereto. According to oral tradition, shortly after Samal was established as a Parish on April 20, 1644, the statue disappeared from its altar and was later found under a camachile tree near a creek, some five kilometers north of Samal. The people of Samal tried to return the image to their church but the same phenomenon occurred three times: the image returned to the same camachile tree where it had been found. The people interpreted this strange occurrence as a sign of God's will that the image should remain in Orani, so a small "visita" was built on that very spot.

In the Battles of La Naval de Manila from 1646 to 1647 against the Protestant Netherlands (that vied with Catholic Spain for colonial supremacy in the Orient), the Dutch invaders took Corregidor and plundered the coast of Bataan but Kapamgpangan and Orani natives under the protection of the Virgin of Orani defeated the Dutch forces who reached their shores. The Dutch marauders who succeeded in plundering Abucay, were also struck by a plague, and were forced to return to Batavia (modern-day Indonesia).

Even in the early years of the Dominicans in Bataan, the new converts already looked up to her as their "protector and guide" and "implored her with love and a lively faith in all their tribulations in life." Many miracles were wrought through her intercession and were fortunately recorded by the Dominicans as a proof of her fame as a "miracle-worker." One account speaks of the mysterious retreat of aggressive aetas who had sought to destroy the town, which was then a village of Samal. Pertinent investigations later showed that a heavenly Matron with a "stern countenance" appeared to the assaulting tribesmen and drove them off. The consensus was that this lady was the Virgin.

There is also the story of a locust plague in 1718 that, for some odd reason, spared only the province of Bataan. Despite the parish priest’s plea for the people to take measures against the plague, the only thing that the townspeople did was to pray at the Virgin’s shrine and their prayers were not in vain. A strong wind blew away the swarm of insects into the sea.

Also famous is the case of a judge from Manila, D. Gregorio de la Villa, who, being gravely ill, sought the Virgin’s help to cure the malady that left him almost totally paralyzed. Even before finishing the novena to the Virgen Milagrosa, he was already up and about and in the pink of health. Just as renowned is the case of a young boy from Bagbag (present-day Novaliches) who died. During his wake, his bereaved mother pleaded to the Virgen Milagrosa del Rosario and sought her maternal compassion. To the surprise of those present, the dead boy stood up and walked to his mother. In gratitude, both mother and child made a pilgrimage to Orani where they relayed what had happened to them to the parish priest, who confirmed the authenticity of the miracle.

Also healed after praying the novena to the Virgen Milagrosa was a leper from Catanggalan (present-day Obando, Bulacan) whose healing over the nine days of the novena was witnessed by the parish priest and by the faithful of Orani. The same Dominicans who recorded these miracles were wise to point out that as a result of these miracles, the devotion to the Virgin of Orani had enjoyed a "growing progression" and that "several volumes would be necessary to narrate the favors and that God has given though her."

In return, the grateful people of Orani would bring herbs and flowers to adorn her altar as well as oil to fuel her lamp. The flowers and herbs and even the oil were later deemed miraculous by the people, just like the waters that sprung from the Virgin’s fountain, which was erected by the townspeople near the port, in her honor. The rich citizens of Orani and Samal, as well as some officials from as far away as Binondo, would donate jewels to her, as recorded in a 1750 inventory of her trousseau. On the other hand, the simple peasants of Orani would dance the "Jota de Orani" at the entrance of the church, as a token of gratitude for bountiful harvests. The shrine would also become the "most beautiful church in the province" and its reconstruction after the many fires and earthquakes that destroyed the building in the 19th and 20th century never lacked funds thanks to the piety and generosity of the people of Bataan and its neighboring provinces.

This piety and generosity were proven during the great fire of March 16, 1938, which destroyed three-fourths of Orani. During the fire, the image was partially damaged but was not totally burned. It was later repaired in the bahay kastila owned by the Salaverria family (the matriarch, Filomena Pascual de Salaverria, was the image's camarera) located just beside the church. The Blessed Sacrament also escaped the conflagration and was found miraculously intact after the fire. The church, despite the hardships the people of Orani endured, was rebuilt in a short time thanks to the people's devotion to their patroness.

During World War II, according to the accounts of Luling Casimiro, one of the seamstresses of the image, a Japanese soldier arrogantly aimed his gun at the statue, but scampered away in fright after the magazine of his gun melted and bent right before his very eyes.

When most of Luzon's seawaters were hit by red tide in the 1990s, Orani's fishermen prayed to the Virgen Milagrosa for help, and Orani's fishing waters were mysteriously spared. To the surprise of the image's caretakers, the hemline of the Virgen's dress was found wet and muddied as though she had gone out to the coast to banish away the red tide.

After the 1991 eruption of Mount Pinatubo, citizens of Porac, Pampanga, came to Orani during the town fiesta to give thanks, claiming that the Rosario of Orani had appeared to them in their dreams telling them to flee to higher grounds to escape the onslaught of lahar. At about the time the lahar had flowed, caretakers of the image found that the Virgen's saya was wet and soiled with lahar as if the Virgin had travelled to Pampanga to come to the aid of her devotees.

== Veneration ==
On April 18, 1984, Cardinal Jaime Sin led the celebrations for the 25th anniversary of the canonical coronation. The 50th or golden anniversary of the canonical coronation was also celebrated with the presence of Cardinal Gaudencio Rosales in 2009.

The feast of the Virgen Milagrosa de Orani is celebrated by hundreds of thousands of devotees from all parts of Luzon, who flock to her shrine annually on the first Saturday in October. At the shrine, the pilgrims pray the rosary, hear Mass, receive Holy Communion and kiss the mantle of the Virgin at the back of the church. The town fiesta of Orani is considered by many as the most lively and joyous in Bataan, and even the whole of Central Luzon, due to the huge number of pilgrims who travel starting on the first day of the novena until the feast day itself. Throughout the town, marching bands can be seen and heard, while stalls selling different products – from food to toys and clothing – line the plaza, the church area as well as main thoroughfares. On the feast day itself, Masses are celebrated every hour from 3:00 a.m. till 9:00 p.m. and all of these Masses are always brimming with people.

Busloads of pilgrims from all over the country also visit her shrine throughout the year, usually on weekends. The second Saturday of every month has been declared as the official pilgrimage day to the shrine. Devotees who fulfill the conditions of confession, communion and prayer for the pope's intentions may gain a plenary indulgence on August 5, on the major feast days of the Virgin Mary or on a day of their choice once a year. This is in virtue of the shrine's inscription as Spiritual Affiliate of the Archbasilica of St. Mary Major in Rome in September 2012.

Then-bishop of Balanga Ruperto C. Santos said, "The caring presence of our Virgen Milagrosa, Our Lady of the Holy Rosary enhances comfort, gives consolation, and is truly an assurance of safety. She brings us to Jesus, and Jesus to us."

== See also ==
- Balanga Cathedral
- Roman Catholic Diocese of Balanga
- Canonically crowned Marian images in the Philippines
- Orani Church
