= Minalin =

Municipality in Pampanga, Philippines

- Municipality
- Municipality of Minalin
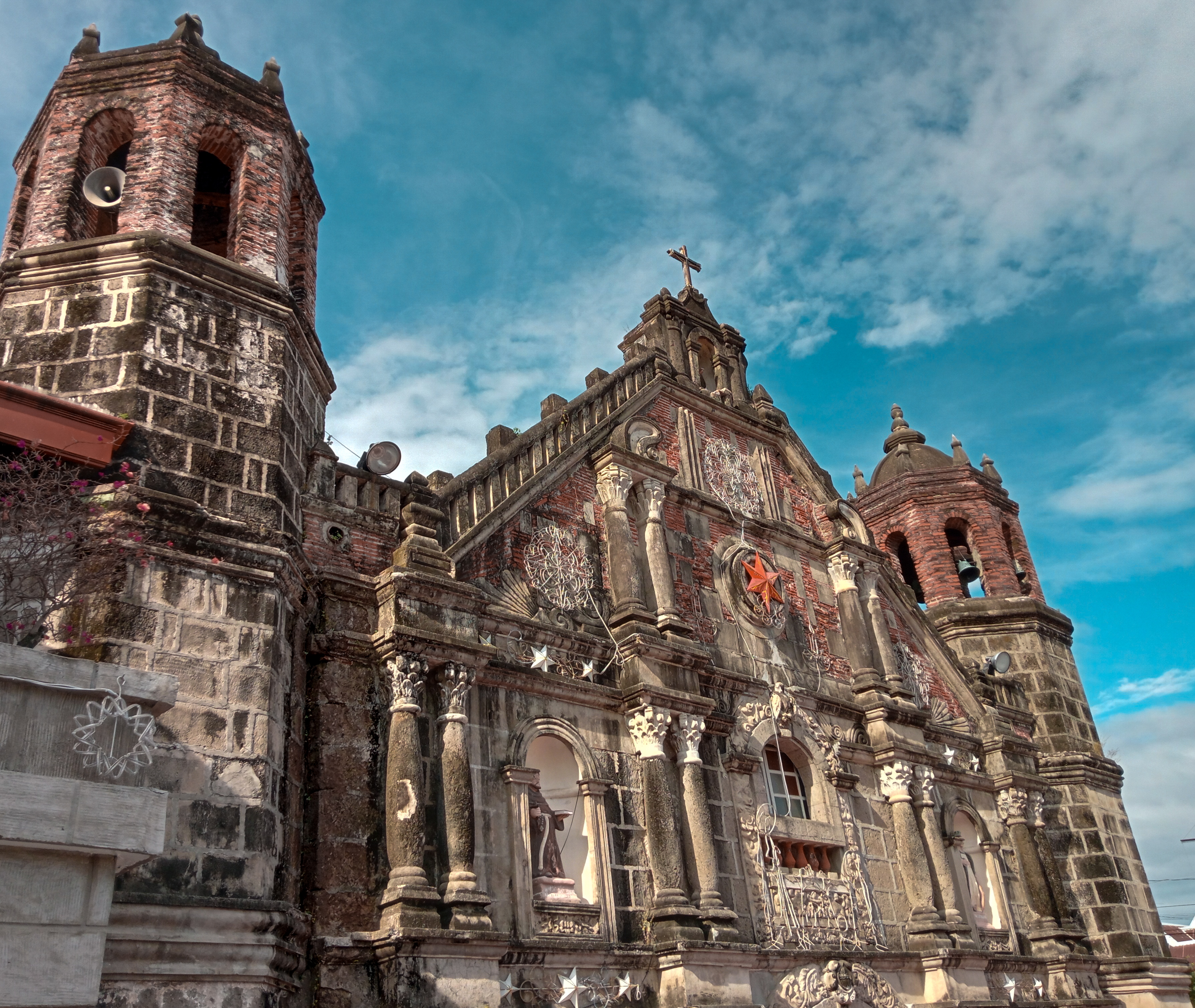
- Sta. Monica Parish Church

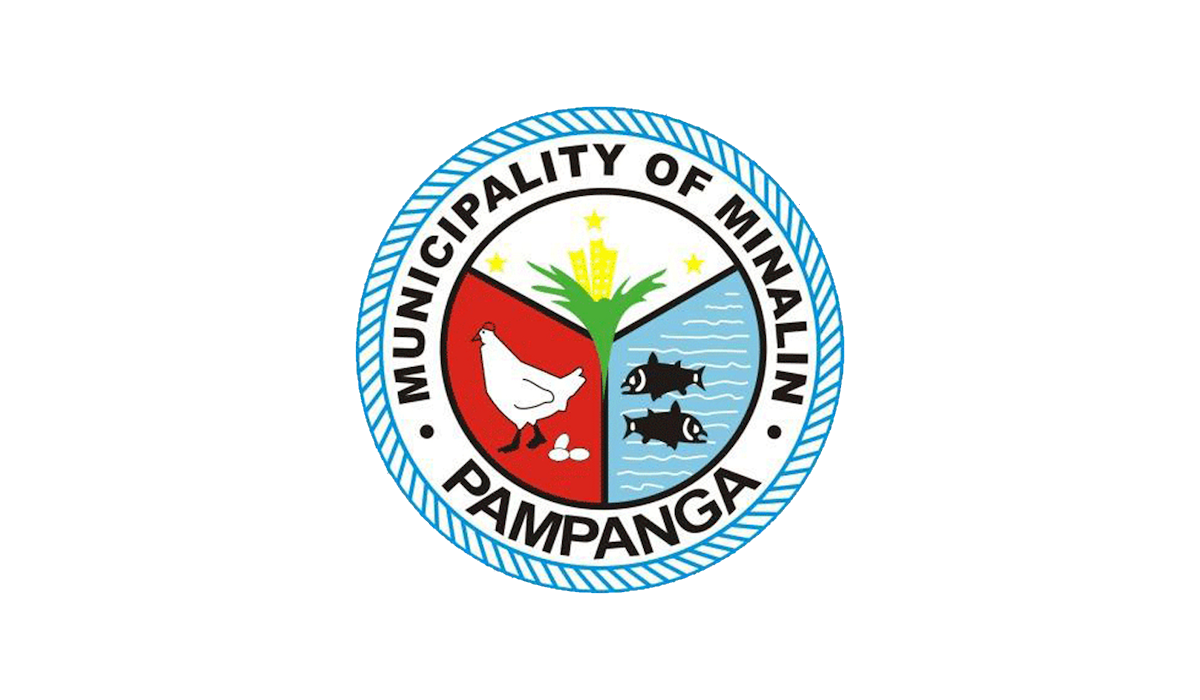
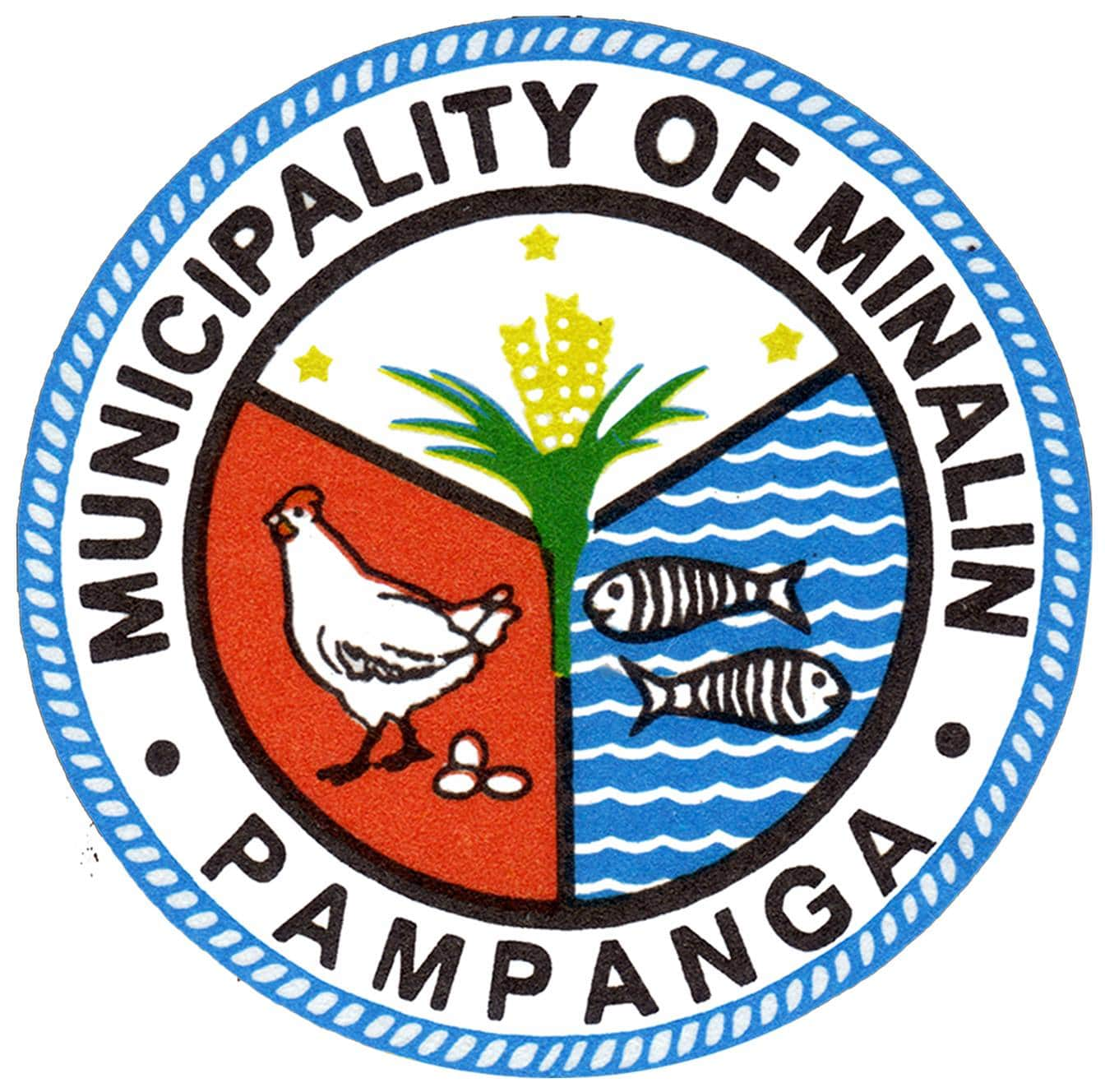
- Flag Seal
- Nickname: Egg basket of Central Luzon
- Motto: "Minaleño First/Panyulung Minalin"
- Anthem: Himno ning Minalin (Minalin Hymn)
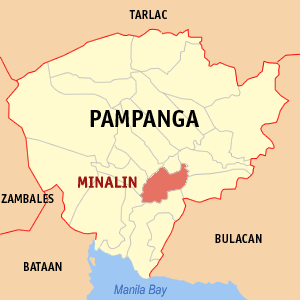
- Map of Pampanga with Minalin highlighted
- Interactive map of Minalin
- Location within the Philippines
- Coordinates: 14°58′N 120°41′E
- Country: Philippines
- Region: Central Luzon
- Province: Pampanga
- District: 4th district
- Founded: August 27, 1614
- Barangays: 15 (see Barangays)

Government
  - Type: Sangguniang Bayan
  - Mayor: Noel Philip S. Naguit
  - Vice Mayor: Rondon M. Mercado
  - Representative: Anna York P. Bondoc
  - Municipal Council: Members: Richelle P. Naguit; Danilo S. Sunga; Christian S. Lagman; Querolico D. Daag; Francisco G. Flores Jr.; Edgar S. Sitchon; Enrico P. Suba; John Nikki P. Sotto
  - Electorate: 32,206 voters (2025)

Area
  - Total: 48.27 km^{2} (18.64 sq mi)
- Elevation: 6.0 m (19.7 ft)
- Highest elevation: 57 m (187 ft)
- Lowest elevation: −4 m (−13 ft)

Population (2024 census)
  - Total: 50,126
  - Density: 1,038/km^{2} (2,690/sq mi)
  - Households: 11,180

Economy
  - Income class: 2nd municipal income class
  - Poverty incidence: 7.94% (2023)
  - Revenue: ₱ 219.8 million (2024)
  - Assets: ₱ 329.2 million (2024)
  - Expenditure: ₱ 211.5 million (2024)
  - Liabilities: ₱ 100.8 million (2024)

Service provider
  - Electricity: Pampanga 3 Electric Cooperative (PELCO 3)
- Time zone: UTC+8 (PST)
- ZIP code: 2019
- PSGC: 0305414000
- IDD : area code: +63 (0)45
- Native languages: Kapampangan; Tagalog
- Website: www.minalin.gov.ph

Minalin, officially the Municipality of Minalin (Kapampangan: Balen ning Minalin; Filipino: Bayan ng Minalin), is a municipality in the province of Pampanga, Philippines. According to the 2024 census, it has a population of 50,126 people.

The name of the municipality came from the word "Minalis" or "Minalis la ding dutung". It was coined when, during the construction of the Sta. Maria Tabungao Church, a flood came and wiped out all the materials or dutung meaning woods and carried them to Santa Monica Parish Church.

The town is known for its 400-year-old church, the Santa Monica Parish Church, with its unique design that incorporates pre-colonial architectural motif alongside its European Catholic iconography. Minalin is also known for its "Aguman Sanduk" New Year's Celebration, where in which the town's straight men dress up as beauty queens and ride through town on festive floats. The town is also referred to as the "Egg Basket of Central Luzon" because of its large-scale production of eggs and chickens, prompting the town to put up the Philippines' first egg festival in 2008.

== Etymology ==
Pansomun (grandson of Prince Balagtas, the ruler of the Kapampangan empire and Luzon), in his will, claimed to be a cousin of Rajah Soliman and Lakandula, the chieftains of Manila and Tondo in 1571 (conquest by Spain). Pansomun, as Christian convert Fernando Malang Balagtas signed in 1589 a will on the Kapampangan territory. Pansomun/Balagtas stated that he was born in Tabungao (Santa Maria, the old location of Minalin).

The legend of Minalin's name came from "minalis la ding dutung, minalis ya ing pisamban" (the lumber moved, and so must the church). Lumber stocks at Santa Maria for the church construction were carried by floods to a hilly Burol. Capitan Diego Tolentino wrote "minalis", thus, the name Minalin evolved.

A Malayan settlement of Kahn Bulaun, Prince Balagtas' descendant, also found in the place, beautiful women. The Spaniards called the sitio, "mina linda de las mujerers" (a mine of beautiful women), which could also be the source of the town's name. Subsequently, Chinese traders abbreviated the words to "Minalin".

Minalin's name might have originated also from "minalis" ("to move to"). "Mina" means mine, a word written on a rock left at the sitio in 1700 by a Spaniard José Espeleta, and "Lin", the founder's name.

Gobernadorcillo (Mayor) Diego Tolentino wrote Minalin in lieu of Minalis and the Calendario Manual y Guia de Forasteros, 1839 to 1841, spelled Minalin, thus Minalin.

In 1860, Minalin was a producer of rice, corn, sugar cane, cacao, indigo (añil) and fruits, including dye, nipa wine, vinegar and mats (petates).

== Geography ==
Originally known as Minalis, it has a land area of about 48.27 km^{2} (18.64 sq mi), and it is located south-west of the capital city of San Fernando.

=== Barangays ===
Minalin is politically subdivided into 15 barangays, as shown below. Each barangay consists of puroks and some have sitios.

BuDaMaSa

- Bulac
- Dawe
- Maniango
- Saplad

Cabalenan

- San Francisco de Asisi (San Francisco Uno)
- San Francisco Javier (San Francisco Dos)
- Santa Catalina
- San Nicolas (Poblacion)
- Santo Rosario
- San Pedro (Including part of Culcul)
- Santa Rita

DoMaLouIs

- Santo Domingo
- Santa Maria
- Lourdes
- San Isidro

=== Climate ===
Climate data for Minalin, Pampanga
Month	Jan	Feb	Mar	Apr	May	Jun	Jul	Aug	Sep	Oct	Nov	Dec	Year
Mean daily maximum °C (°F)	30 (86)	31 (88)	33 (91)	34 (93)	33 (91)	31 (88)	29 (84)	29 (84)	29 (84)	30 (86)	31 (88)	30 (86)	31 (87)
Mean daily minimum °C (°F)	19 (66)	20 (68)	21 (70)	23 (73)	25 (77)	25 (77)	25 (77)	25 (77)	24 (75)	23 (73)	22 (72)	20 (68)	23 (73)
Average precipitation mm (inches)	8 (0.3)	9 (0.4)	15 (0.6)	34 (1.3)	138 (5.4)	203 (8.0)	242 (9.5)	233 (9.2)	201 (7.9)	126 (5.0)	50 (2.0)	21 (0.8)	1,280 (50.4)
Average rainy days	3.7	4.1	6.5	11.2	21.2	24.9	27.7	26.5	25.5	21.8	12.6	5.6	191.3
Source: Meteoblue

== Demographics ==
Population census of Minalin

Year	Pop.	±% p.a.
1903	6,282	—
1918	7,219	+0.93%
1939	9,805	+1.47%
1948	9,856	+0.06%
1960	16,223	+4.24%
1970	21,896	+3.04%
1975	25,428	+3.04%
1980	27,414	+1.51%

Year	Pop.	±% p.a.
1990	34,795	+2.41%
1995	35,670	+0.47%
2000	35,150	−0.31%
2007	40,084	+1.83%
2010	44,001	+3.45%
2015	47,713	+1.55%
2020	48,380	+0.29%
2024	50,126	+0.85%

Source: Philippine Statistics Authority

In the 2024 census, the population of Minalin was 50,126 people, with a density of 1,000 inhabitants per square kilometre or 2,600 inhabitants per square mile.

== Economy ==
Poverty incidence of Minalin (%)

Source: Philippine Statistics Authority

Minalin is one of the fastest growing economy in Pampanga despite its propensity to develop flooding.

Merchandising, farming and fishing are the usual source of living of Minalenos. The town is known as the "Egg Basket of Central Luzon" because of its large scale production of eggs and chickens. Tilapia, shrimp, crabs are also major products of the town.

== Government ==
=== Local government ===
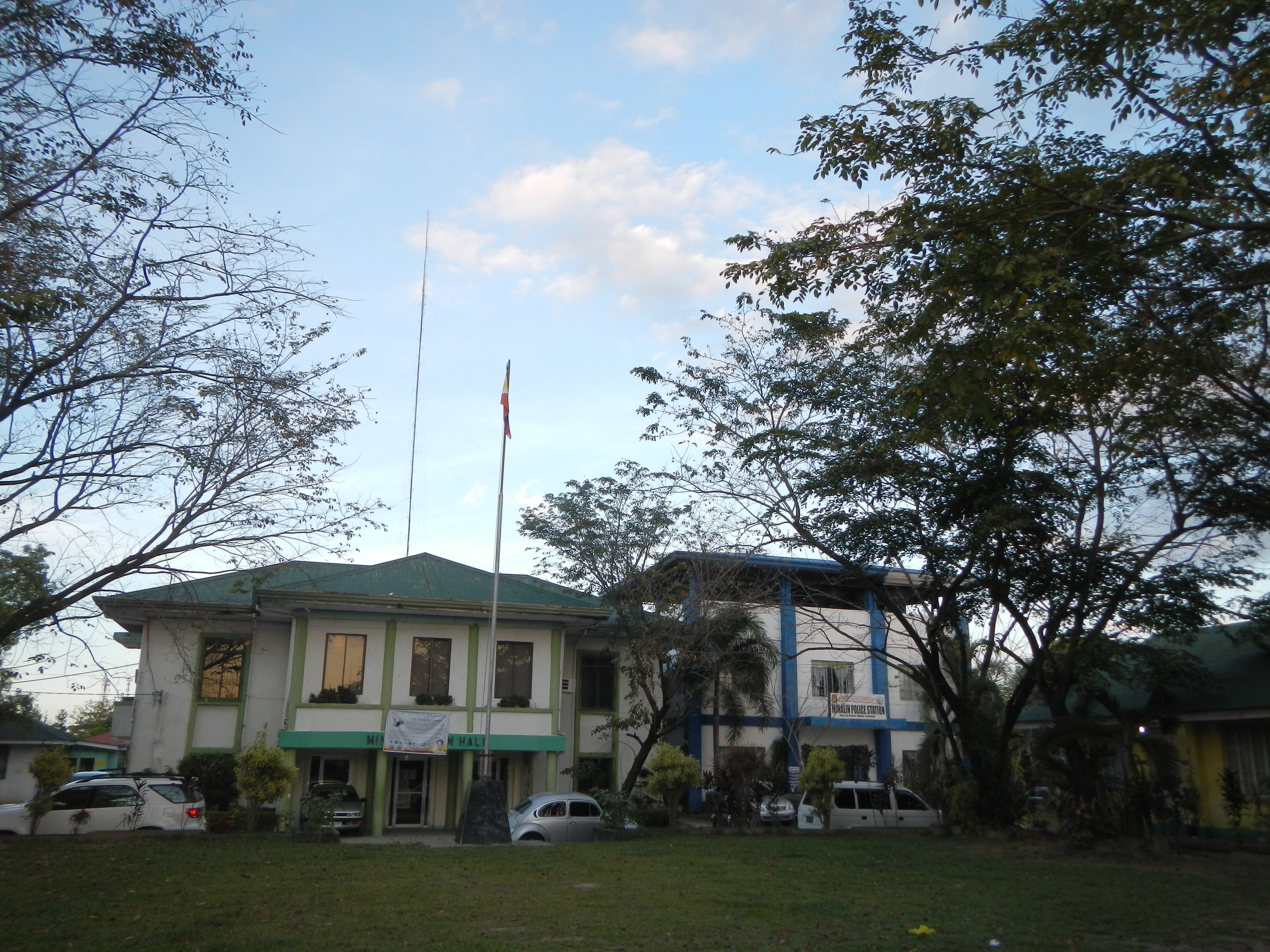
Town hall (seat of Government, Pamahalaang Bayan)

The municipal government is divided into three branches: executive, legislative and judiciary. The judicial branch is administered solely by the Supreme Court of the Philippines. The legislative branch is composed of the Sangguniang Bayan (town assembly), Sangguniang Barangay (barangay council), and the Sangguniang Kabataan for the youth sector.

The mayor and vice mayor are elected to three-year terms. The mayor is the executive head and leads the town's departments in executing the ordinances and improving public services. The vice mayor heads a legislative council (Sangguniang Bayan) consisting of councilors from the barangays or barrios.

=== Elected officials ===
Municipal Officials (2025-2028):

- Mayor: Noel Philip Naguit
- Vice Mayor: Rondon Mercardo
- Councilors:
  - June Flores
  - Francis Bautista
  - Fernando Tongol
  - Genie Magat
  - Princess Fatima Mercado
  - Querolico Daag
  - John Nikki Sotto
  - Megatix Atienza

== Tourism ==
Tourist attractions of the town include its "Aguman Sandoc" New Year's Celebration and the 400-year old Santa Monica Parish Church in Barangay San Nicolas.

=== "Aguman Sanduk" Festival (Minalin New Year's Celebration) ===
One major tourist attraction in Minalin is its "Aguman Sanduk" New Year's Celebration in which the straight men of the town dress as beauty queens and ride through town on festive floats - displaying not only humor but also the camaraderie and charity of each member of the community.

The celebration has also been referred to as the "Belles of Minalin" but Minalin natives prefer to continue calling the event "Aguman Sanduk", which translates literally as "Association of the Ladle".The event is differentiated from gay pride parades because the event is specifically intended for heterosexual males, and is intended simply to be an act of fun, rather than a statement about gender.

This is an avenue where men from all walks of life cross-dress and dare to step out of their statuses. Whether you are a known public figure, a farmer, or a professional, it is with utmost pride that a man from Minalin will dare step out of his status to give joy (pikatulan) to his people. With the continuous celebration of the festival, it is a living proof of how Minaleños value camaraderie (pamakiabe). It is the dare that keeps the community's bond and strengthen the ties of Minaleños.

This annual display of beautiful dresses and expertise in women's make up signifies that this town follows the dynamic changes in women's fashion not only in the Philippines but also in Europe, Asia and in other countries.

=== Egg Festival ===
On June 4, 2008, Minalin celebrated its fame for producing over a million chicken eggs per day by holding the country's first "First Egg Festival." An exhibit of Minalin's egg produce was put up, and a taste test of 10,000 boiled eggs was held. Also, 70 poultry raisers donated 100,000 eggs to Typhoon Cosme's victims in the nearby provinces of Pangasinan and Zambales.

Mayor Edgar Flores and President Gloria Macapagal Arroyo graced the exhibit of their egg produce, and a taste test of 10,000 boiled eggs. Also, 70 poultry raisers donated 80,000 eggs to Pangasinan's "Cosme" typhoon victims, and 20,000 shall go to Zambales.

=== La Purisima Concepcion Festival ===
On 2008, the Sta Maria Barangay Youth Ministry of Barangay Sta Maria spearheaded the said festival. It is in honor of the Image of La Purisima Concepcion which was according to the book, Piaquitan qng Milabas ning Sta Maria, in the year 1609, an image was found placed inside a dried gourd skin (Tabungao in Spanish) floating in front of the chapel they were building.

=== Sunset Park ===
A 3,896 sq.m. Minalin Sunset Park in Santa Rita was inaugurated on July 14, 2018. It is like an esplanade or boardwalk built along ‘Tabun Road’ now Sunset Boulevard, next to a river adjacent to the Minalin Tail Dike.

== Education ==
The Minalin Schools District Office governs all educational institutions within the municipality. It oversees the management and operations of all private and public, from primary to secondary schools.

=== Primary and elementary schools ===
- Bulac Elementary School
- Dawe Elementary School
- Lourdes Elementary School
- Maniango Elementary School
- Minalin Elementary School
- Mother Mary Eugenie Center of Studies and School
- San Francisco Elementary School
- San Isidro Elementary School
- San Pedro Elementary School
- Saplad Elementary School
- Sta. Maria Elementary School
- Sta. Monica de Minalin Montessori School
- Sta. Rita Elementary School
- Sto. Domingo Elementary School

=== Secondary schools ===
- Anita G. Flores National High School
- Bulac High School
- Sta. Maria National High School
- Sto. Rosario National High School

== Notable personalities ==
- Eddie Panlilio, former priest and politician, former governor of Pampanga

== Gallery ==
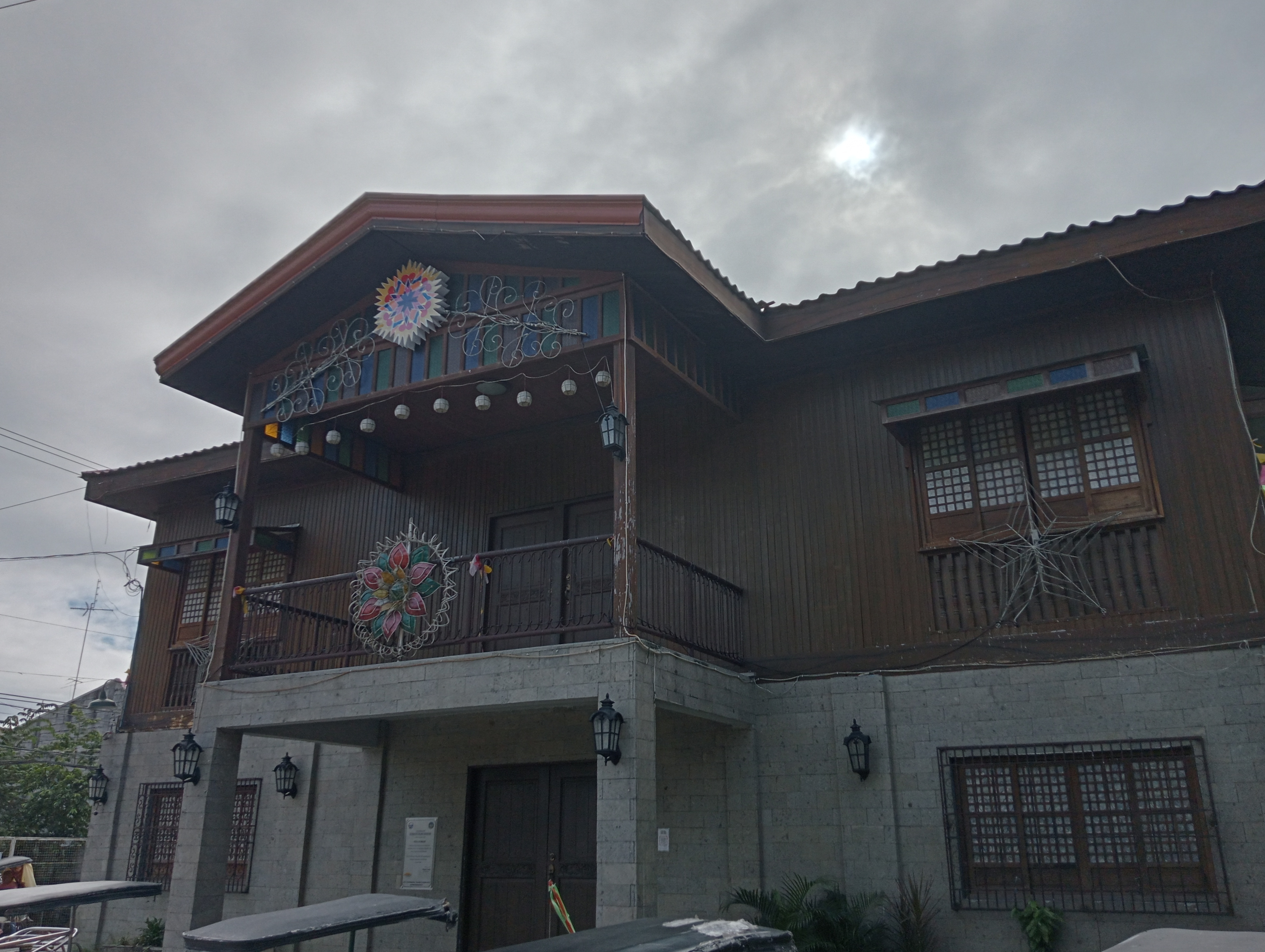
Old Municipal Hall Museum

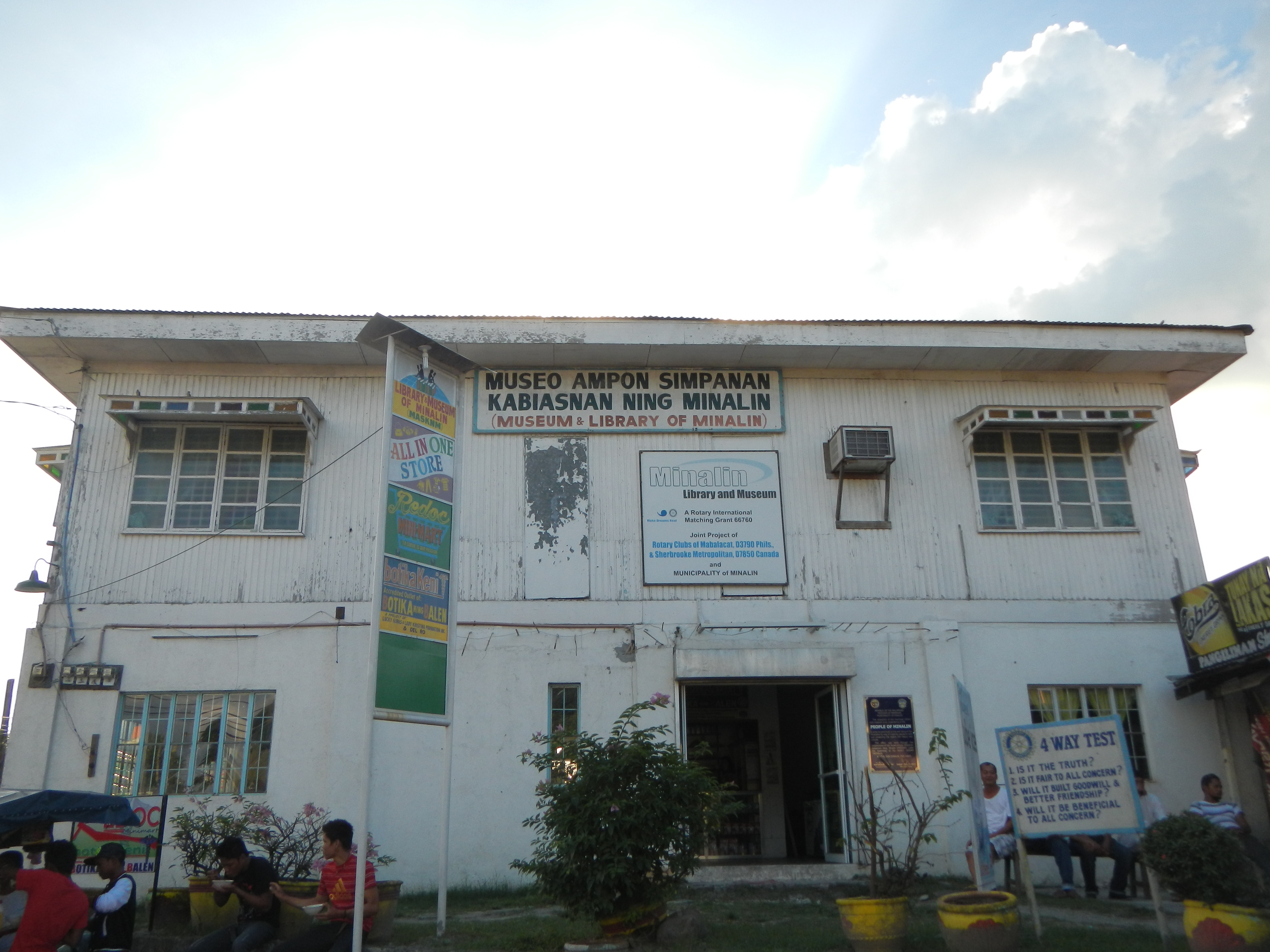
Museum-Library of Minalin

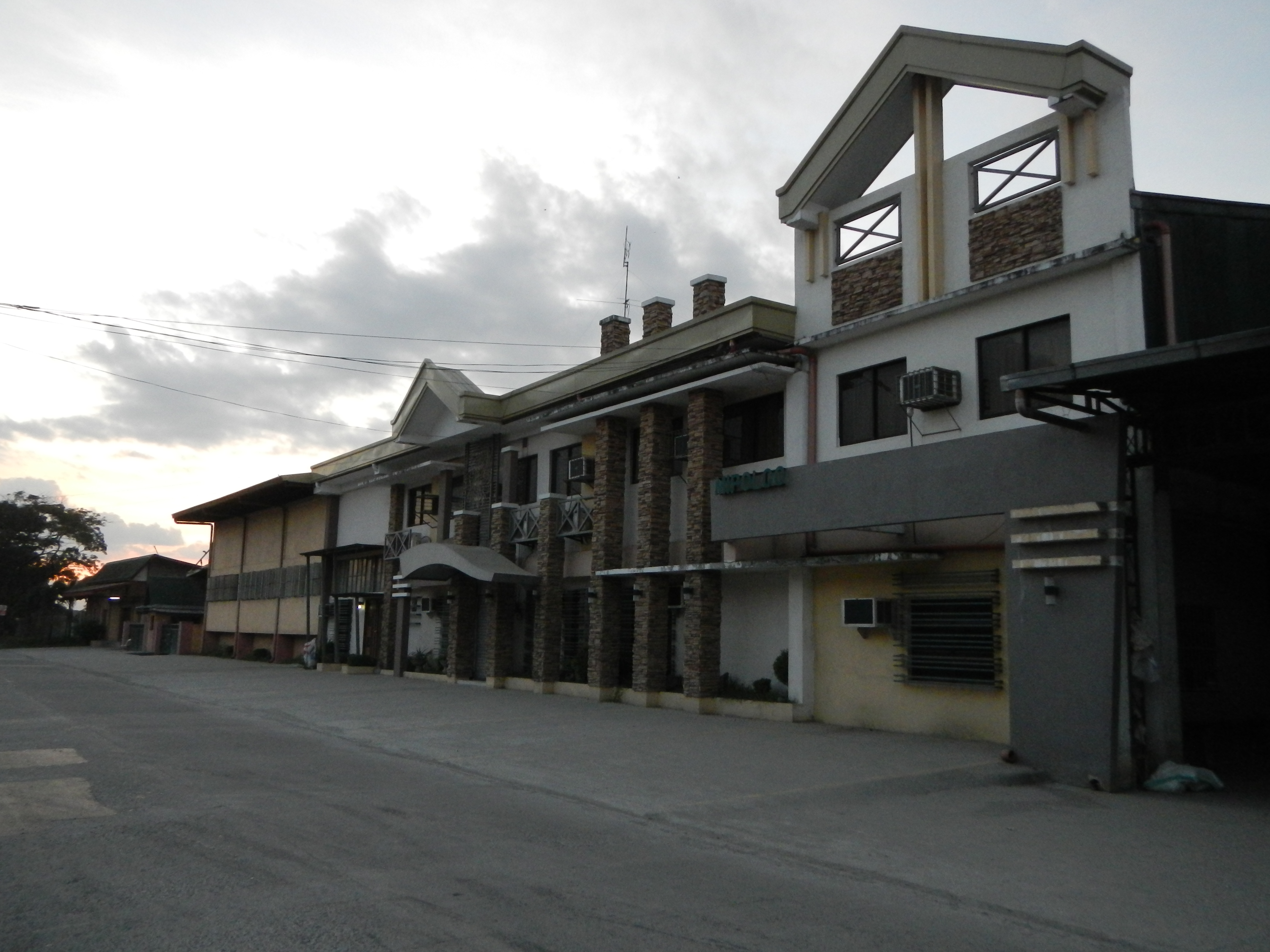
Minalin Poultry & Livestock Cooperative (MIPOLCO)

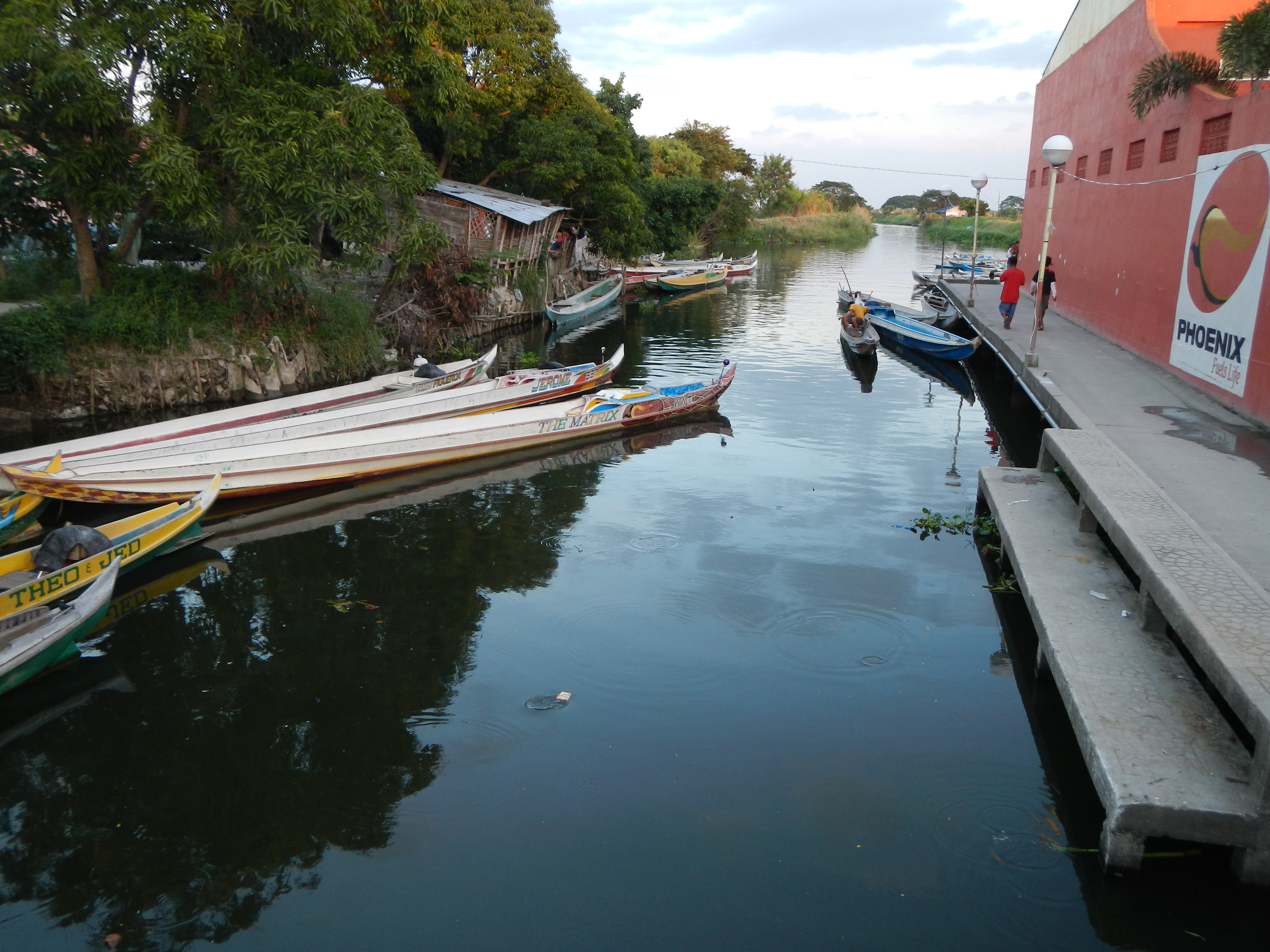
Bancas by the bridge serving the residents of the barrios

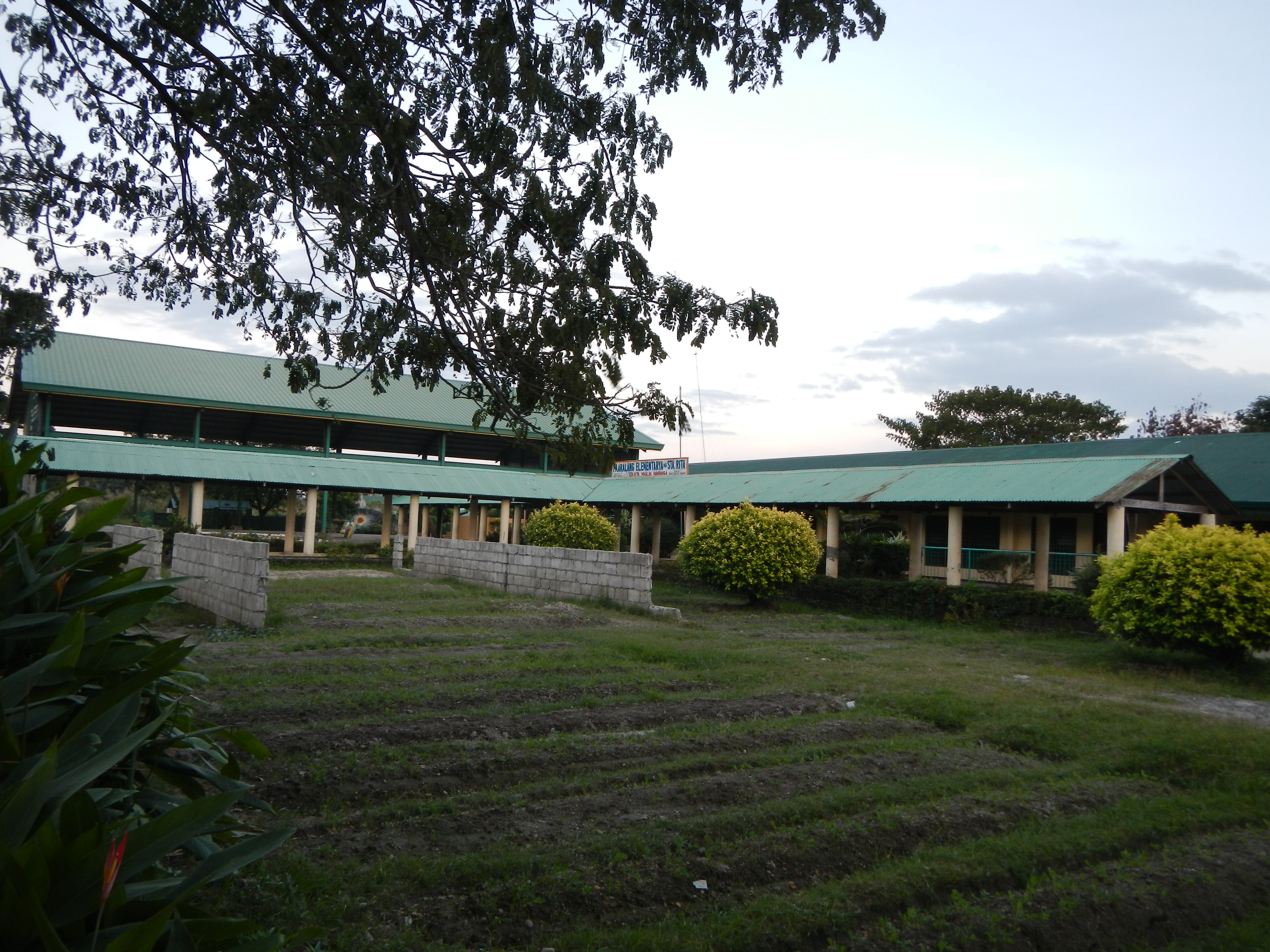
Santa Rita Elementary School

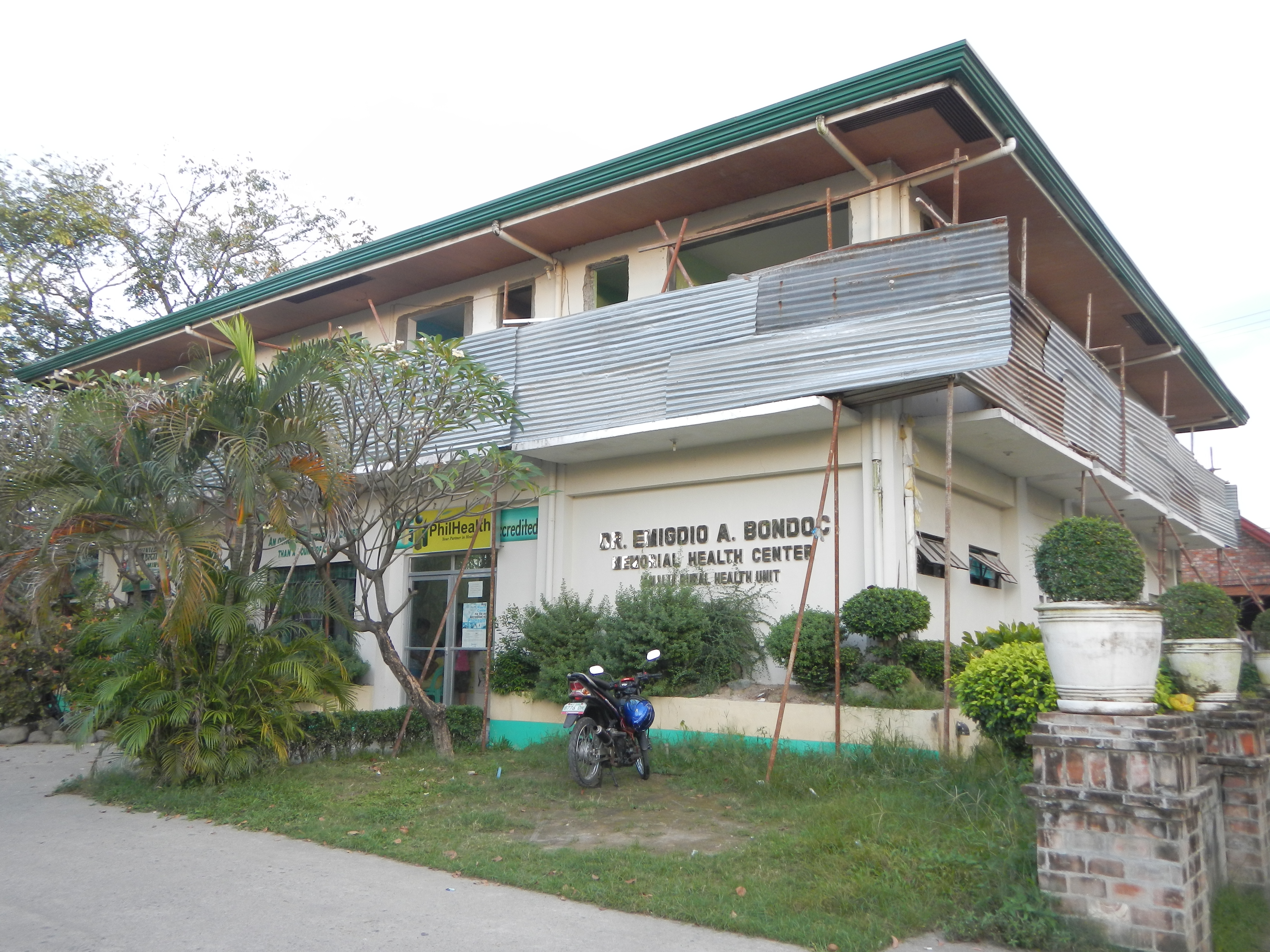
Dr. Emigdio A. Bondoc Memorial Health Center (beside the Town hall)

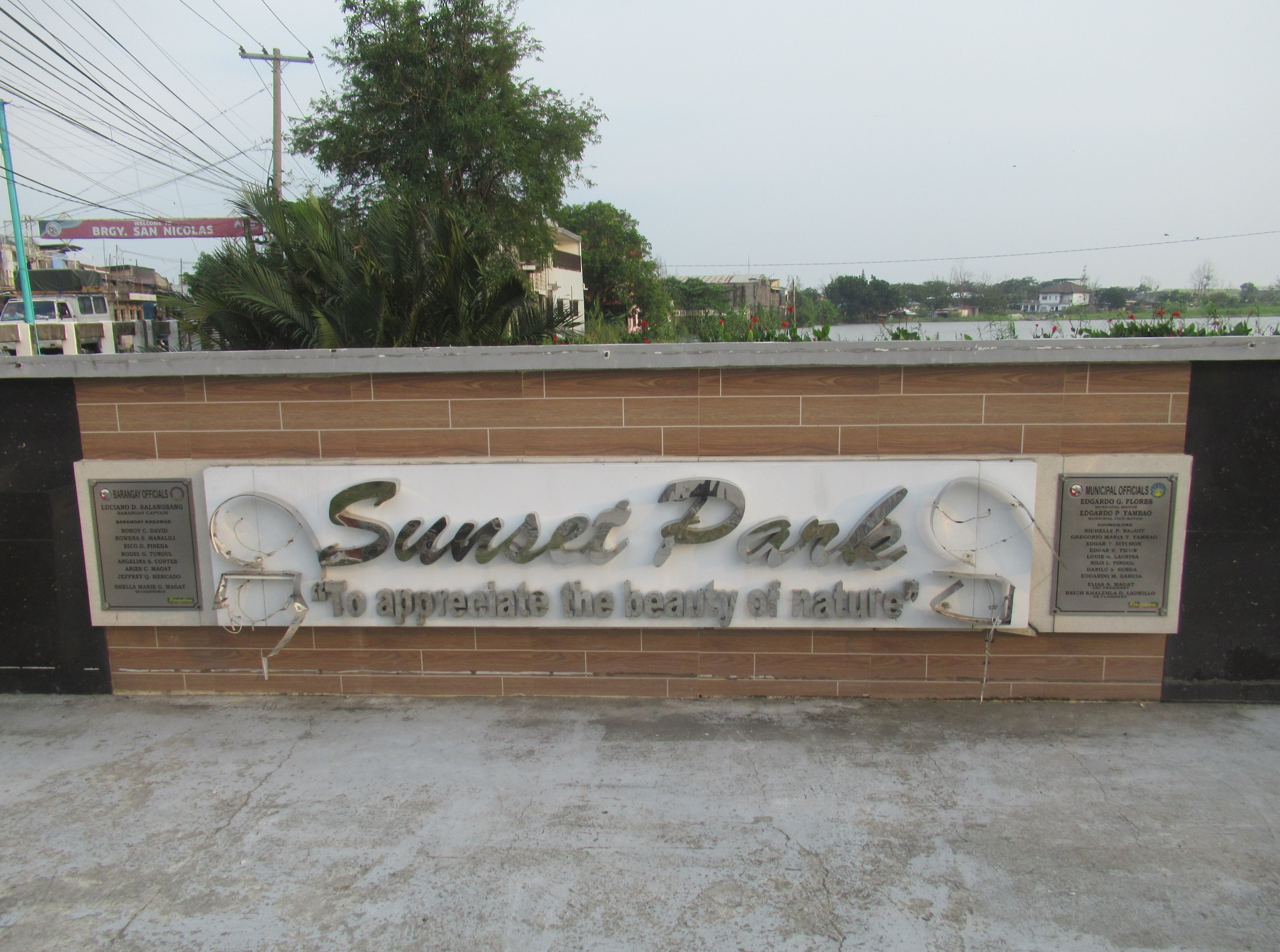
Sunset Park
