= Santa Monica Parish Church (Minalin) =

Roman Catholic church in Pampanga, Philippines

Minalin Church
- Santa Monica Parish Church; Iglesia Parroquial de Santa Mónica (Spanish)
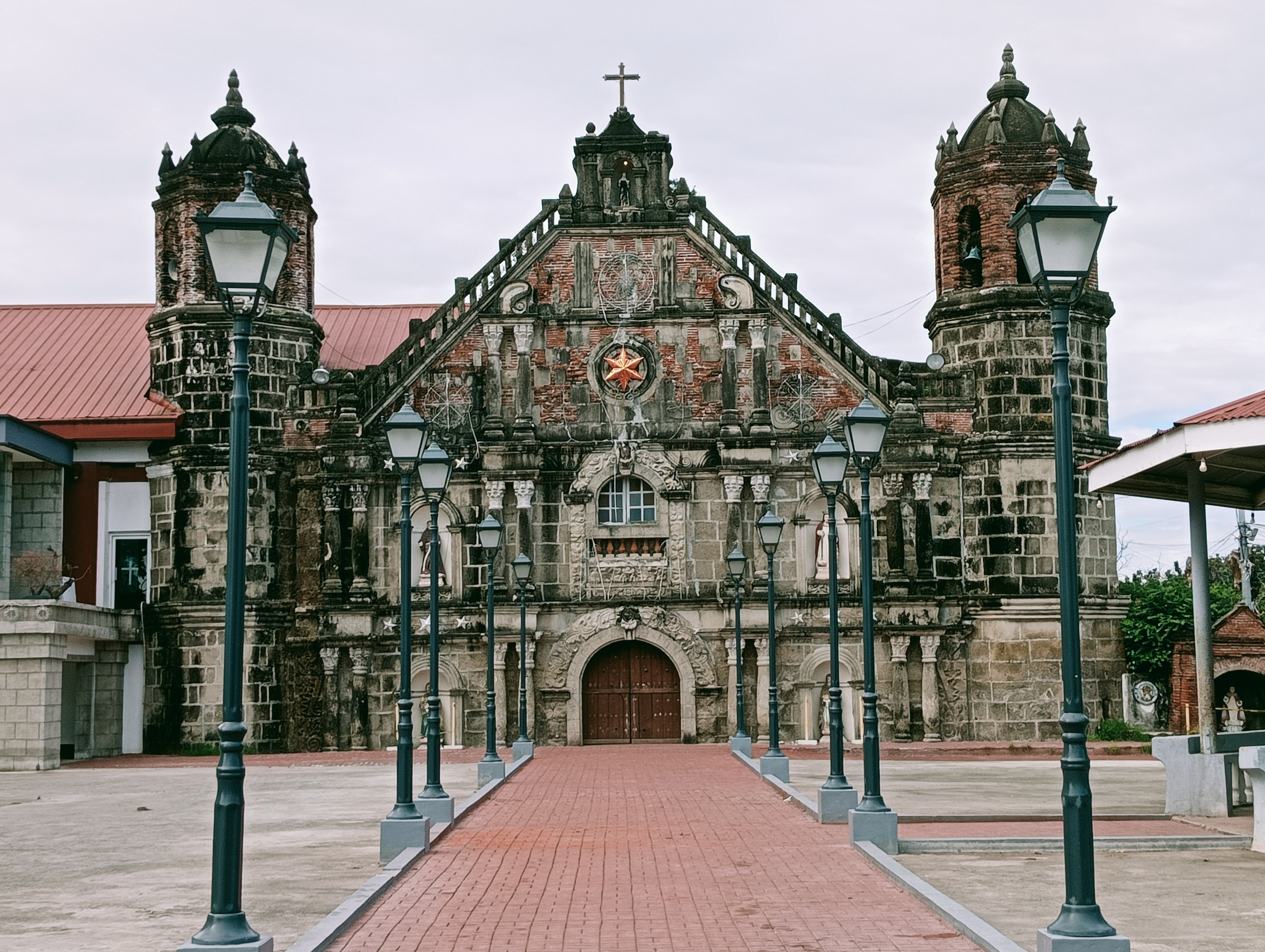
- Church facade in 2023

- Location in Luzon Location in the Philippines
- 14°58′06″N 120°41′01″E
- Location: San Nicolas, Minalin, Pampanga
- Country: Philippines
- Denomination: Roman Catholic

History
- Status: Parish church
- Dedication: Saint Monica of Hippo
- Consecrated: 1834, 2011

Architecture
- Functional status: Active
- Heritage designation: National Cultural Treasure
- Designated: August 27, 2011
- Architect: Fr. Manuel Franco Tubil
- Architectural type: Church building
- Style: Baroque
- Groundbreaking: 1764
- Completed: 1834

Specifications
- Length: 52 metres (171 ft)
- Width: 13 metres (43 ft)
- Height: 11 metres (36 ft)
- Materials: Sand, gravel, cement, mortar, steel and bricks

Administration
- Archdiocese: San Fernando

Clergy
- Archbishop: Florentino Lavarias
- Priest: Rev. Fr. Pedro G. Valencia

Santa Monica Parish Church, commonly known as Minalin Church, is a Baroque Roman Catholic church, located in poblacion area of San Nicolas in Minalin, Pampanga, Philippines. The church, built during the Spanish era, was declared a National Cultural Treasure by the National Commission for Culture and the Arts and the National Museum of the Philippines on August 27, 2011, one of 37 churches in the country bestowed that honor.

The parish church is part of the ecclesiastical province of the Roman Catholic Archdiocese of San Fernando, under the Vicariate of Christ The King. The church is under the patronage of Saint Monica of Hippo, with a feast day celebrated annually every second Sunday of May. The current parish priest is Rev. Fr. Pedro G. Valencia succeeding Rev. Fr. Lyndon Valenton.

== History ==
Founded in 1614, Minalin parish started as a visita (sub-parish) of Macabebe, Pampanga. Fr. Miguel de Saldaña was assigned in 1618 as its own parish priest. On October 31, 1624, the Minalin parish became an independent vicariate under its prior, Fr. Martín Vargas. Minalin was given the two visitas of Pangasinan and Tubungao (Santa Maria) in 1633. The act was reconfirmed in 1639. The convent of Minalin was under the Augustinians as of May 5, 1670, was added to Bacolor on May 9, 1650, and to Betis on October 21, 1678. Don Lorenzo Malaca was the first native secular assigned to Minalin in 1771, succeeded by Don Manuel Francisco Tubil.

The original location of the church was in Barangay Santa Maria. However, lumber stocks for the church construction were carried by floods from Santa Maria to a hilly place called Burol, which eventually became the location of the present church. The legend of the town's name came from "minalis la ding dutung, minalis ya ing pisamban" (the lumber moved, and so must the church). Capitan Diego Tolentino wrote the location as "minalis", which evolved into "Minalin".

There are no records as to who built the church, although it has been attributed to the work of Augustinian Fr. Manuel Franco Tubil in 1764. One documented source cites the church's completion by the Augustinians in 1834. Another account shows that construction by Augustinian friars was started sometime in the 1600s and completed in 1764. Mayor Cristino Lagman on July 30, 1911, stated that the church was completed in 1764 under Bachiller Calixto Gregorio.

Fr. José Seguí, the Archbishop of Manila, visited Pampanga in 1831 and met the secular parish priest of Minalin, Don Quintín Cándido Paríon. Dr. Mauricio Miranda was the parish priest in 1834 when the great flood occurred devastating the town. Despite the church's elevated location, the flood waters of 1834 reached its main altar.

The Church was reconstructed at various stages: in 1854, 1877 (repaired by Fr. Isidro Bernardo), 1885 (by P. Galo de la Fuente) and in 1895 (by Vicente Ruiz). Fr. José Torres' petition to rebuild the church and parochial house, was granted about July 5, 1866. The last Augustinian friar was Fr. Faustino Diez and the church was turned over to Alcalde (Mayor) Pedro Diaz and to the first native priest P. Macario Panlilio. Another account states that the last Augustinian priest to serve Minalin was Fr. Jose Sales.

In 1937, the Most Rev. Michael J. O'Doherty, Archbishop of Manila, approved the request of Rev. Fr. Prudencio David, parish priest of Minalin, for re-plastering of the walls and repainting of the church interiors. Parish priest Fr. Daniel Castrillo, a Spanish Augustinian was assigned in August 1942.

=== 2011 inauguration and declaration ===
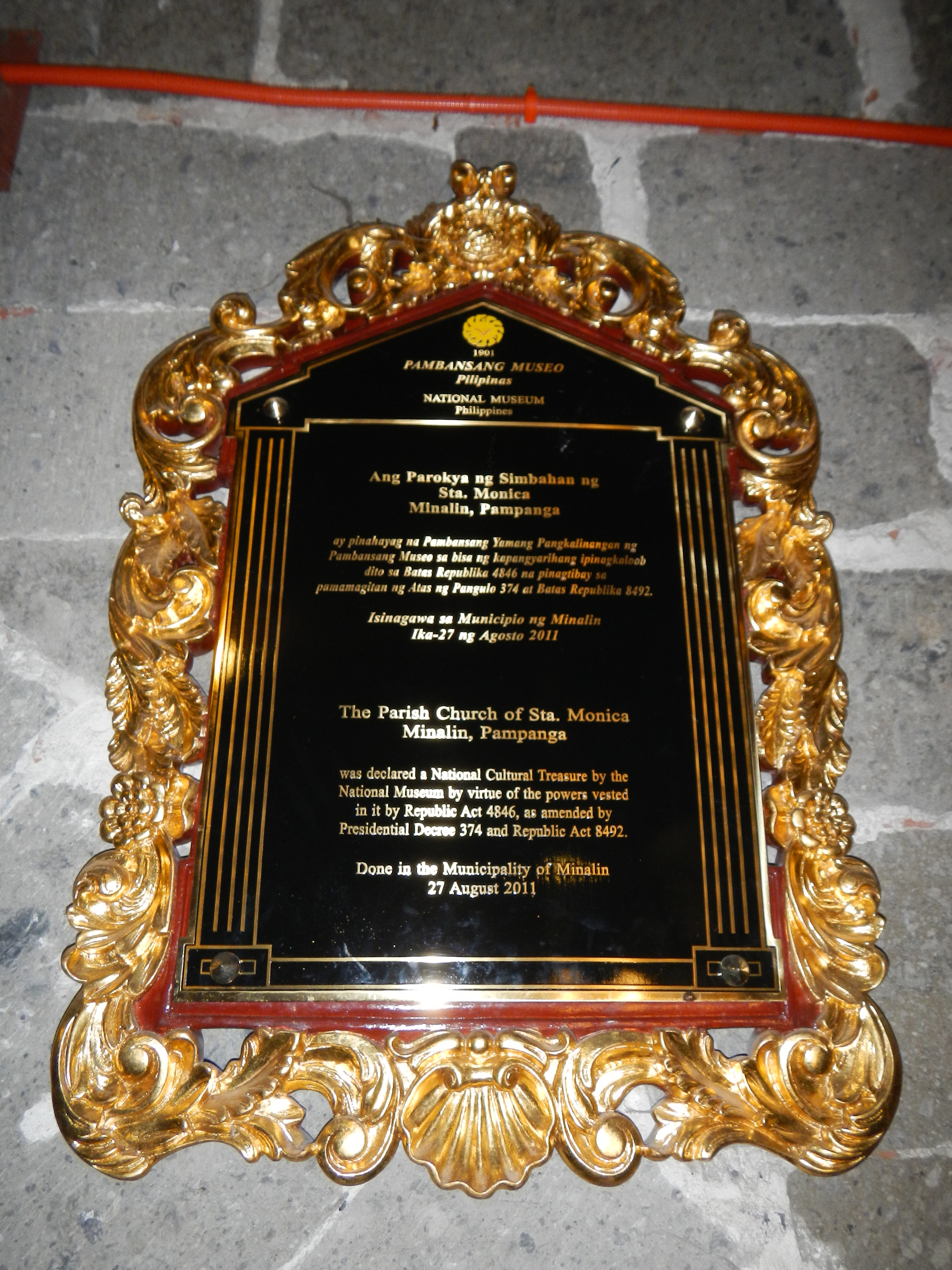
The National Cultural Treasure historical marker

The Philippine National Commission for Culture and the Arts (NCCA) called for the conservation and protection of Spanish-era churches because of heritage and culture, declaring them as National Cultural Treasures (NCT). Priority status was bestowed not just due to their historical value, but also based on the geographic representation of various regions across the nation. The Santa Monica Church was declared such by the National Museum of the Philippines on August 27, 2011.

Ahead of the 400th founding anniversary of Minalin Parish ("Aldo ning Minalin") in 2014, the National Museum of the Philippines per Director Jeremy Barns inscribed the Santa Monica Church of Minalin as a National Cultural Treasure (NCT) for three reasons: First, its façade that resembles a giant "retablo" and was influenced by Christian, Buddhist, Hinduist and animistic cultures; second, the four capilla posas (prayer nooks or corner chapels) that are still duly preserved or intact at the four corners of its front patio and can only be found at the Santa Monica Church; and lastly, the old painting of the Our Lady of Consolation giving the cords to Saint Monica and her son Saint Augustine in the main altar. The church was the second NCT in Pampanga, after the Betis Church (Saint James Parish Church) in Betis, Guagua, Pampanga.

Archbishop Paciano Aniceto, D.D., and Minalin parish priest Fr. Greg Vega both celebrated the historic Mass with Interior and Local Government Secretary Jesse Robredo and Minalin Mayor Arturo "Katoy" Naguit as guests.

== Description ==
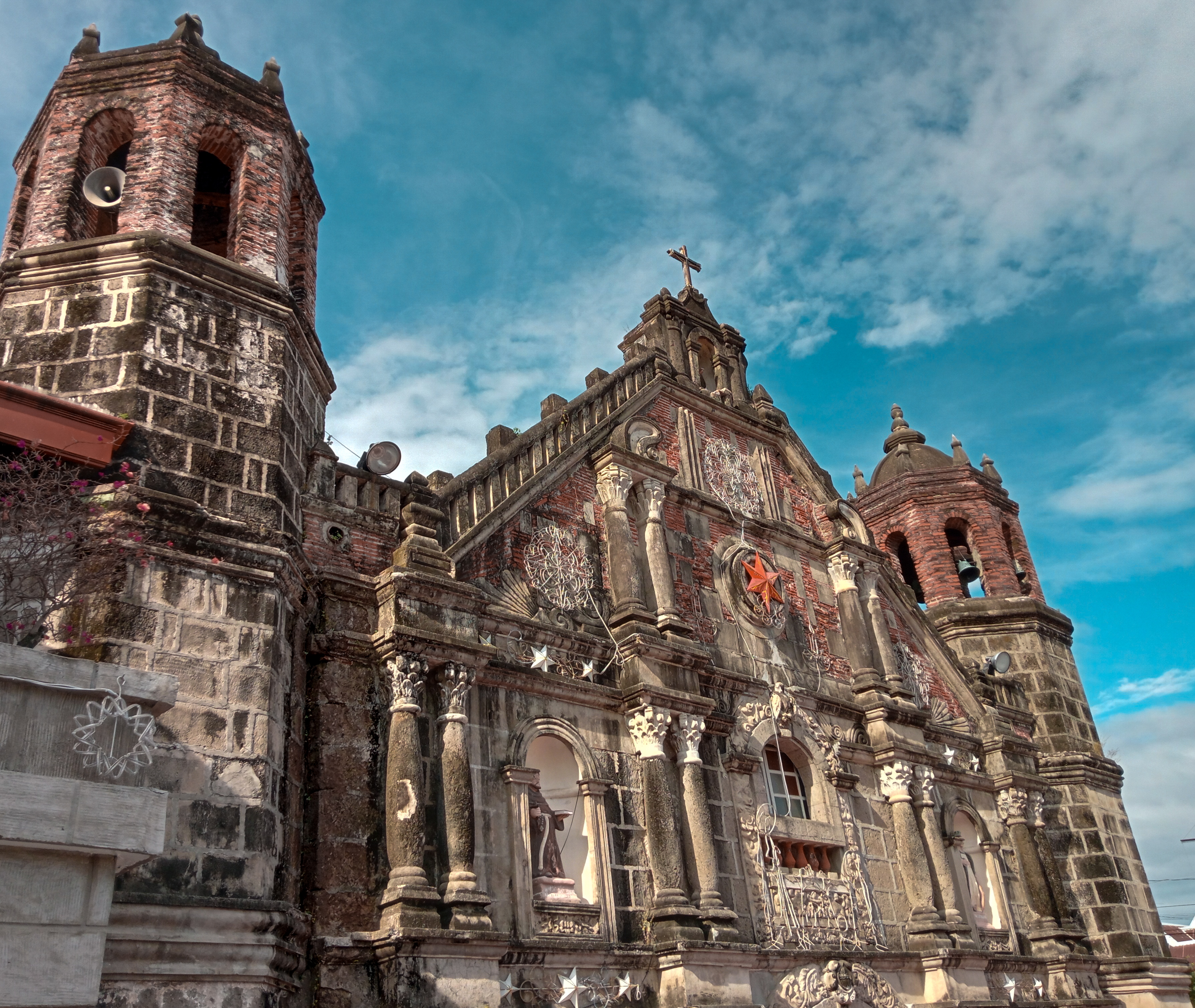
Retablo-like facade in 2023

The four-century old Minalin Parish in Barangay San Nicolas is one of the first 20 missions put up by the Augustinians when they came to the Philippines. The church's design includes motifs reflective of pre-Hispanic culture. The spires decorating the bell towers depict a Moorish architecture, hinting of the old Islamic faith of early Minalin residents; none of the other 20 mission churches have similar motifs. The incipient baroque is of moderate decorative traits. There are several examples of this style in the churches built in the 18th century or before, such as those of Betis, Lipa, San Vicente, Candon, Magsingal and Sarrat.

The church and convent is probably a center of religious orders – foremost Augustinians, Franciscans, Jesuits and Dominicans. They heavily influenced the life and culture of the natives as evidenced by the images of Saint Augustine, Saint Francis of Assisi, Saint Dominic and Saint Francis Xavier in the reredos according to Minalin Parish Priest, Fr. Vega.

The Santa Monica Church measures 52 metres (171 ft) long, 13 metres (43 ft) wide and 11 metres (36 ft) high. Twin towers flank the façade of the church. It has a transept and some reredos. The peeled palitada (outer layer) reveals the original red brick walls, giving the church its unique old-rose touches.

The most notable and striking architectural feature of the church is its retablo-like façade, the lavishly floral decorations of the main entrance and the windows above it. The floral décor is evocative of early folk altars. An array of coupled Corinthian columns artistically crowd the center of the facade and act as support for the triangular pediment that is topped by a roof lantern or cupola. During the Spanish era, a lighted beacon was placed on top of the apex of the pediment to guide fishermen as they made their way from the river to the town. The structure is further complemented with a short row of balusters. The semi-circular niches hold painted stone statues of various Augustinian saints, designed to blend with the rose windows.

There is a dramatic contrast between volumes and projecting fenestrations, rose windows and semi-circular statue niches. The vertical movement is accentuated by the twin hexagonal four-story bell towers flanking the facade.

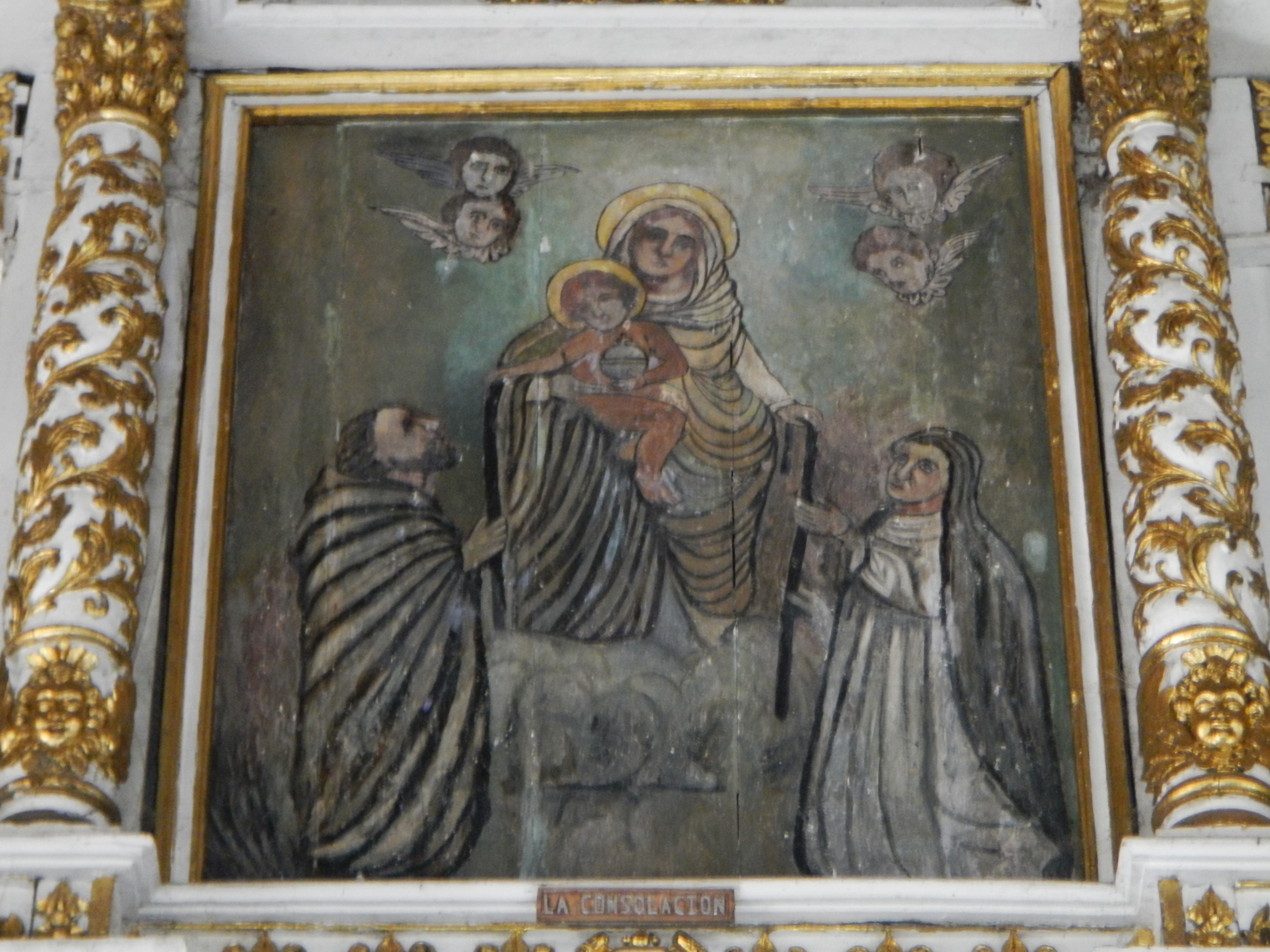
The painting of Our Lady of Consolation at the apex of the reredos.

The two hexagonal towers are solidly built. The four bells dated between 1850 and 1877 are dedicated to Saint Augustine and Saint Monica. The church-convent complex is enclosed by a low stone atrium with four capillas posas, a rarity in the Philippines.

The ballast of the Minalin Church depicts Kapampangan mythological figures. Seals above the three side entrances symbolize St. Augustine and his work The City of God. The right belfry contains one of the two centuries old bells remaining in Minalin and the two smaller rotary bells.

=== Minalin Mural (1619) ===
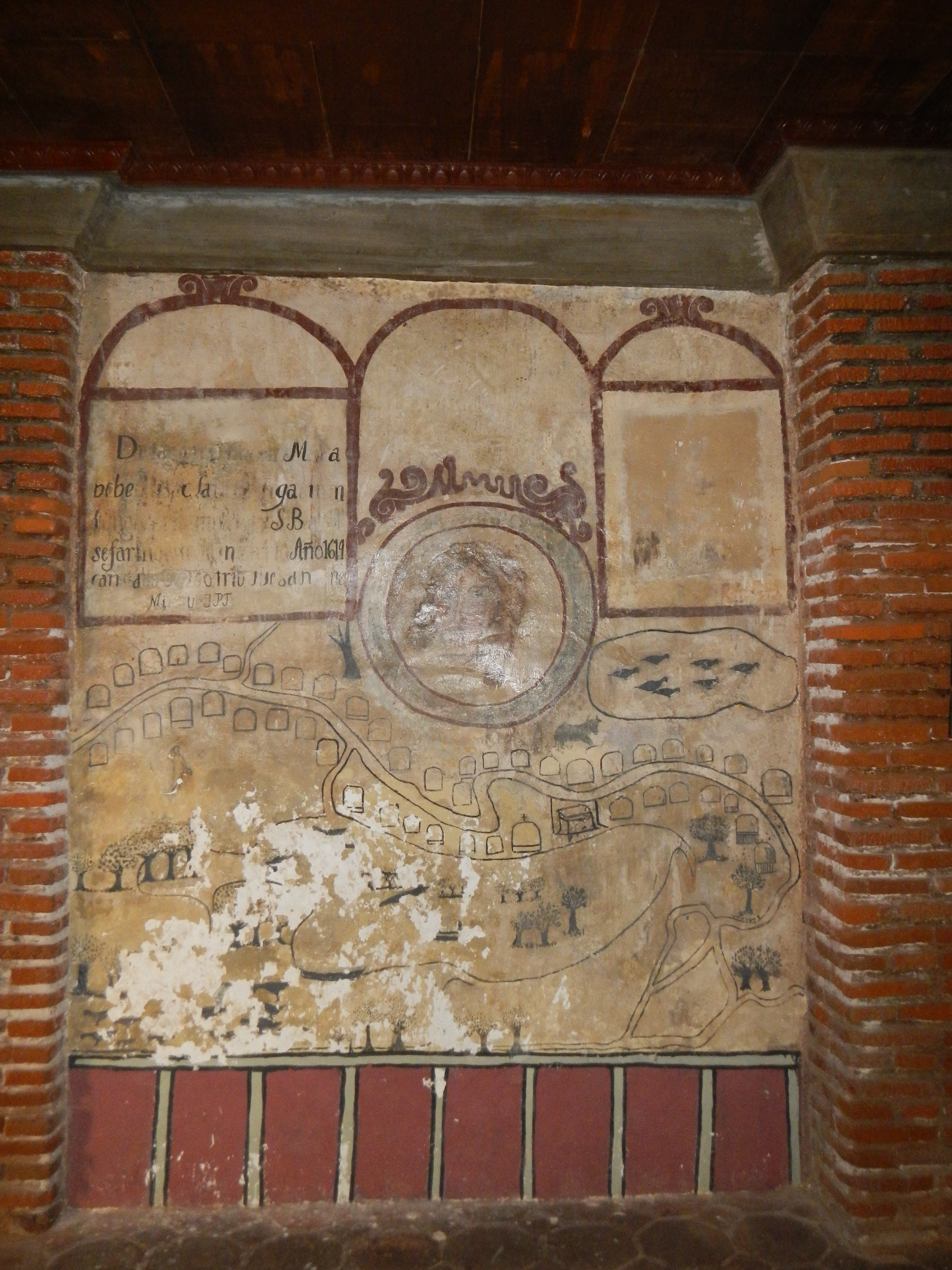
The 1619 mural detailing Minalin, Pampanga during that period

The upper floor of the church convent contains native drawings of mysterious origins. The ancient mural painting (1619) is a primitive-looking map with details of trees, ducks, crows, a boat, a hunter and a crocodile. The year 1619 was a founding date of the town of Minalin. Of the 20 original Augustinian missions, Minalin is the only one that bears corbels showing pre-Hispanic culture.

The church has elaborately decorated classical-style stone corbels and beams in the convent and high up in the church's ceiling, with carvings depicting pre-Hispanic pagan deities like naga (serpent), dapu (crocodile), galura (eagle) and bulig (mudfish). The trees, ducks, crows, a boat and a hunter are very much imposing.

The "Minalin Mural" is 89 inches (2,300 mm) wide and 113 inches (2,900 mm) tall showing the flora and fauna of Minalin during the early 1600s. It is a tale of "prehistoric landscape of riverine communities", marshes and swamps with birds, agricultural land with damulag (carabao) and a farmer at the background. The map depicts the town as the seat of the Kapampangan region, according to a will by Francisco Malang Balagtas or Pansomun.

The ancient painting is made of argamasa – a type of cement used during the period which is made of lime mortar, fine river sand, and egg whites. The mural bears the date "1619", and is believed to have been made within five years of that date.

The Moorish architecture is evidenced by the motifs: carved ornamental heads of bulig (mudfish), naga (dragon) and dapu (crocodile) – sacramental figures of the old Kapampangan religious belief system. Comparable to the Muslim Mindanao torogan, the spires of the bell towers depict a Moorish architecture, showing the Islamic faith of early Minalin residents.

When the ceiling was renovated in 1939, the mural paintings on it were removed. Msgr. Pablo Díaz did the restoration of the church in 1982 while Fr. Rolando López renovated the convent in 1998.

In November 2012, residents who evacuated to the convent because of floods destroyed the lower left portion of the ancient mural. Mayor Arturo Naguit restored and preserved the convent mural with the assistance of engineers from Mapúa Institute of Technology.

=== Four capillas posas ===
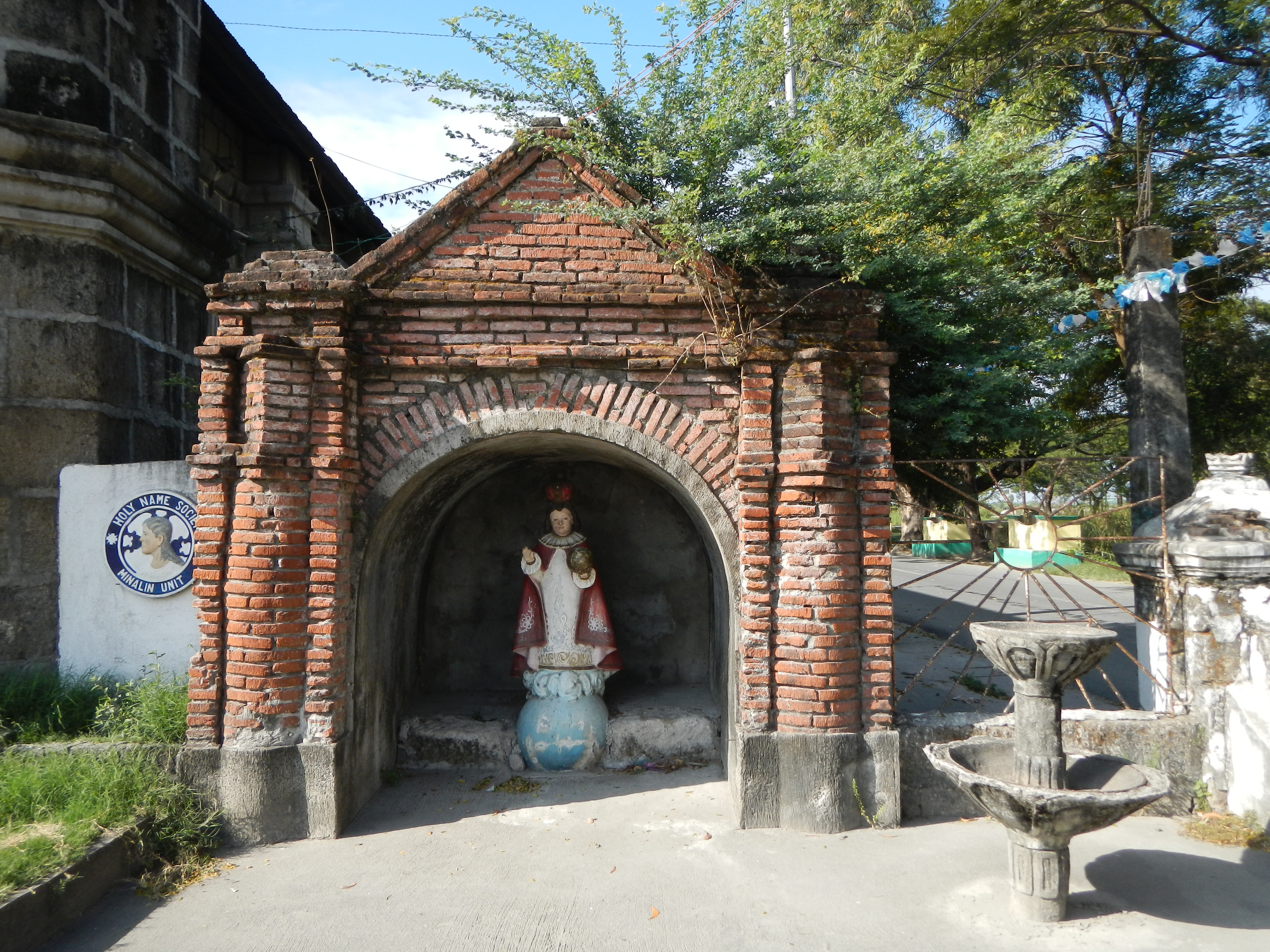
Santo Nino, the 4th of the capillas posas

The many side and back minor altars of Santa Monica Church characterize it as one of the best examples of Baroque architecture in the Philippines. The four capillas posas are concrete arched structures used as "oratory stations" for the Blessed Sacrament during Christ the King, Corpus Christi and other events.

The capilla posa distinguishes Santa Monica Church as the only church in the Philippine that has these features fully preserved today. During the Hispanization of Minalin, these altars were used by Filipinos (termed by the Spaniards as Indios) as the church interior was reserved for "peninsulares" (full-blooded Filipino-Spaniards).

=== Our Lady of Consolation painting ===
At the apex of the main altar is one of the churches highly valued possession, the old painting of Our Lady of Consolation. The devotion to Our Lady of Consolation began when St. Monica in a vision received a black leather belt from the Blessed Virgin, who assured the holy widow that she would take under her special protection all those who wore it in her honor. In return, Monica gave it to her son, Augustine, who later changed his ways and eventually became one of the saints in the Roman Catholic Church.

The 18th-century painting of Our Lady of Consolation at the top level of the reredos of the main altar of Sta. Monica Parish Church, depicts the Blessed Virgin Mary holding Jesus her child. She is wearing a cord which is a representation of a belt that she supposedly gave to St. Monica, mother of St. Augustine. According to Rev. Fr. Pedro Galende, director of the San Agustin Museum, the belt is a "symbol of chastity" that represents Mary's Immaculate Conception delivery of Jesus into the world.

The feast of Our Lady of Consolation is celebrated every September 4. The Clausura Procession is held every last Saturday of the month after the mid-morning Mass. The image is passed on from one shoulder to another shoulder by devotees as the procession goes around the convent in the tradition of the early monastic period.

=== Pierced heart of Sta. Monica ===
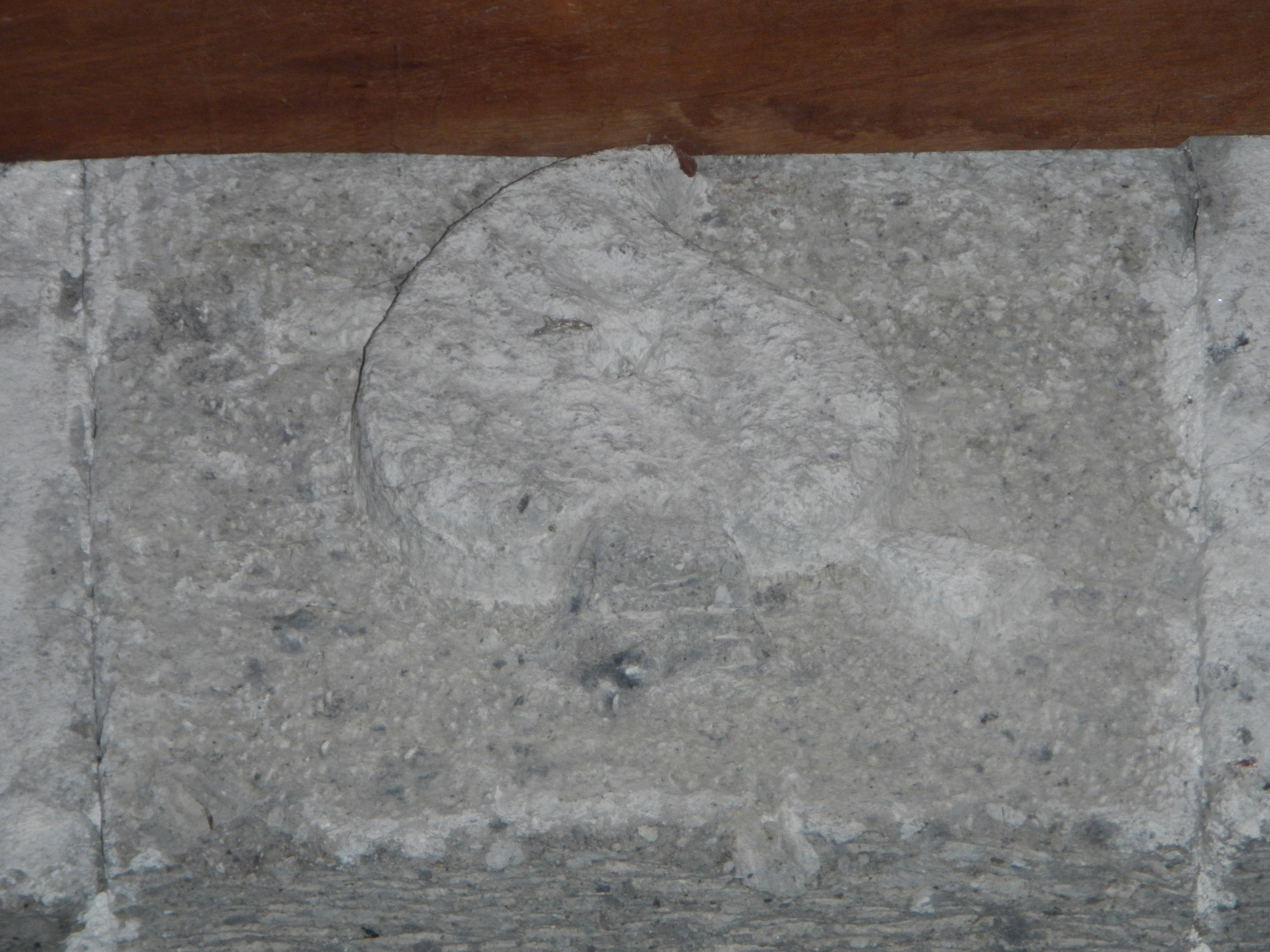
Pierced heart of St. Monica (under the choir loft)

On August 26, 2011, parish Priest Fr. Vega announced the discovery of the heart, an unusual bas relief or sculpture carved from an adobe beam supporting the choir loft at the church entry, being hidden for centuries inside the old wooden ceiling.

Inverted and pierced with arrow, it is unlike other parts of the church, particularly above entry doors. Churches also had centuries-old bas reliefs all depicting emblems of St. Augustine (his book City of God, his miter, and a church). Her heart is supposed to symbolize sufferings because of Augustine's previous sinfulness.

The church architecture evolved during the construction by Augustinian friars in the 1600s and completed in 1764, demonstrating a confluence of various cultural influences. Lotus flowers with Buddhist motif are carved in one door, while wooden trusses supporting the roof are shaped at the edge like a crocodile reflecting local pre-Hispanic folk beliefs.

== Media ==
- The church was used as one of the shooting locations for the 2009-2013 ABS-CBN's religious-themed teleserye May Bukas Pa.
- The church was also used as one of the shooting locations for the 2022-2023 GMA Network's historical fantasy portal-themed teleserye Maria Clara at Ibarra and 2024 action war teleserye Pulang Araw.

== Gallery ==
Outside Minalin Church

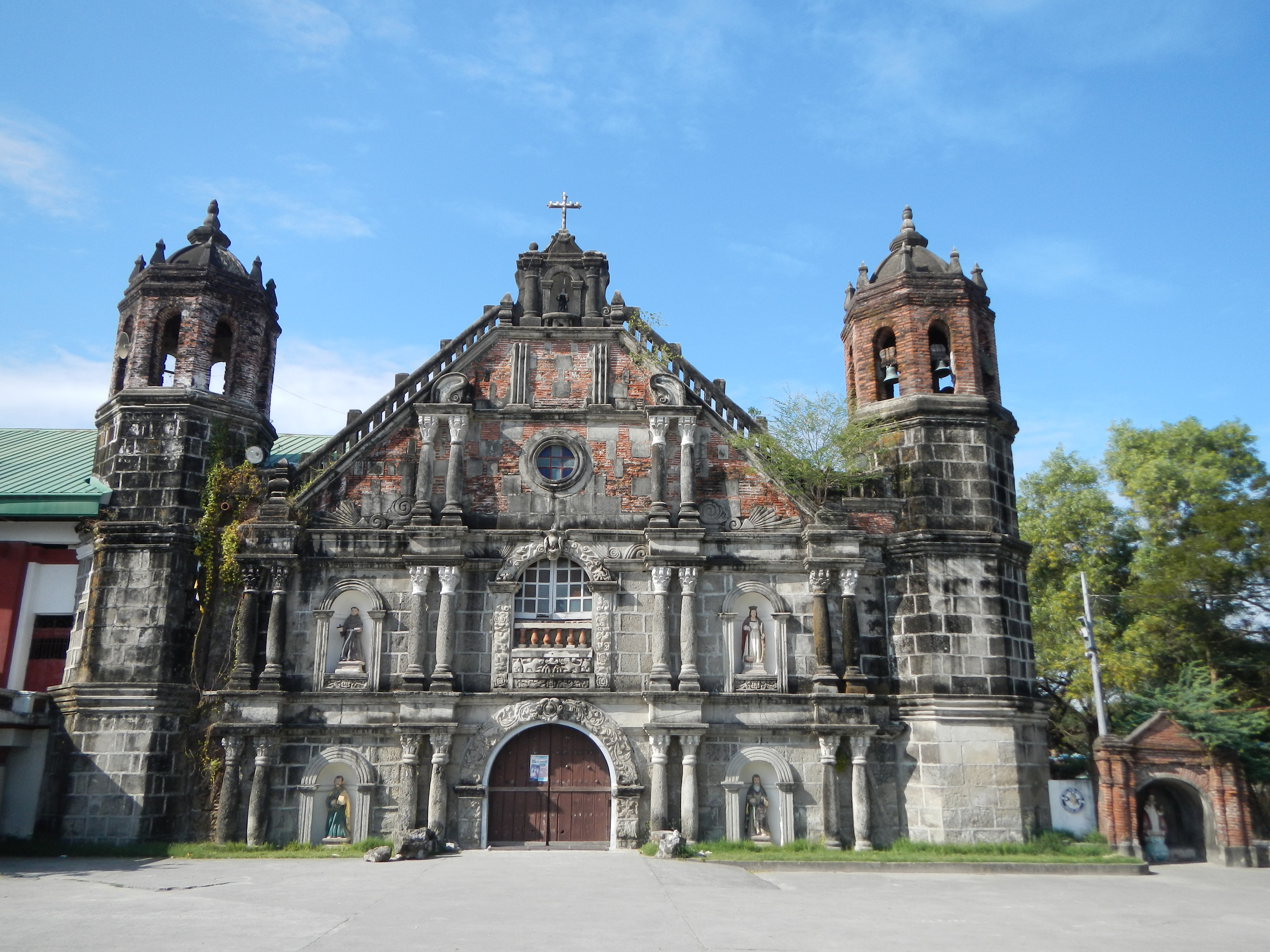
The retablo-like façade of Santa Monica Parish Church in 2013

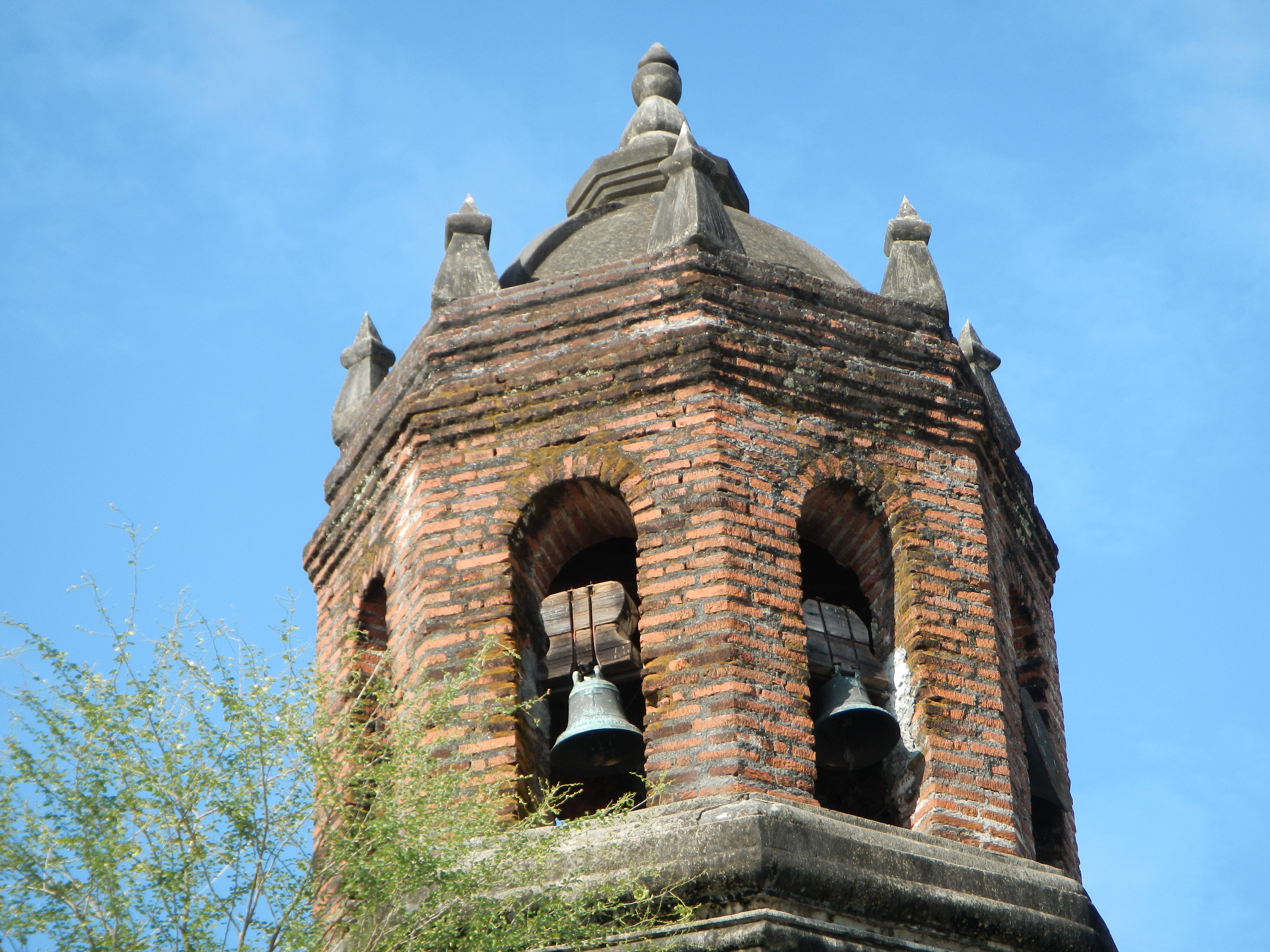
Bell tower

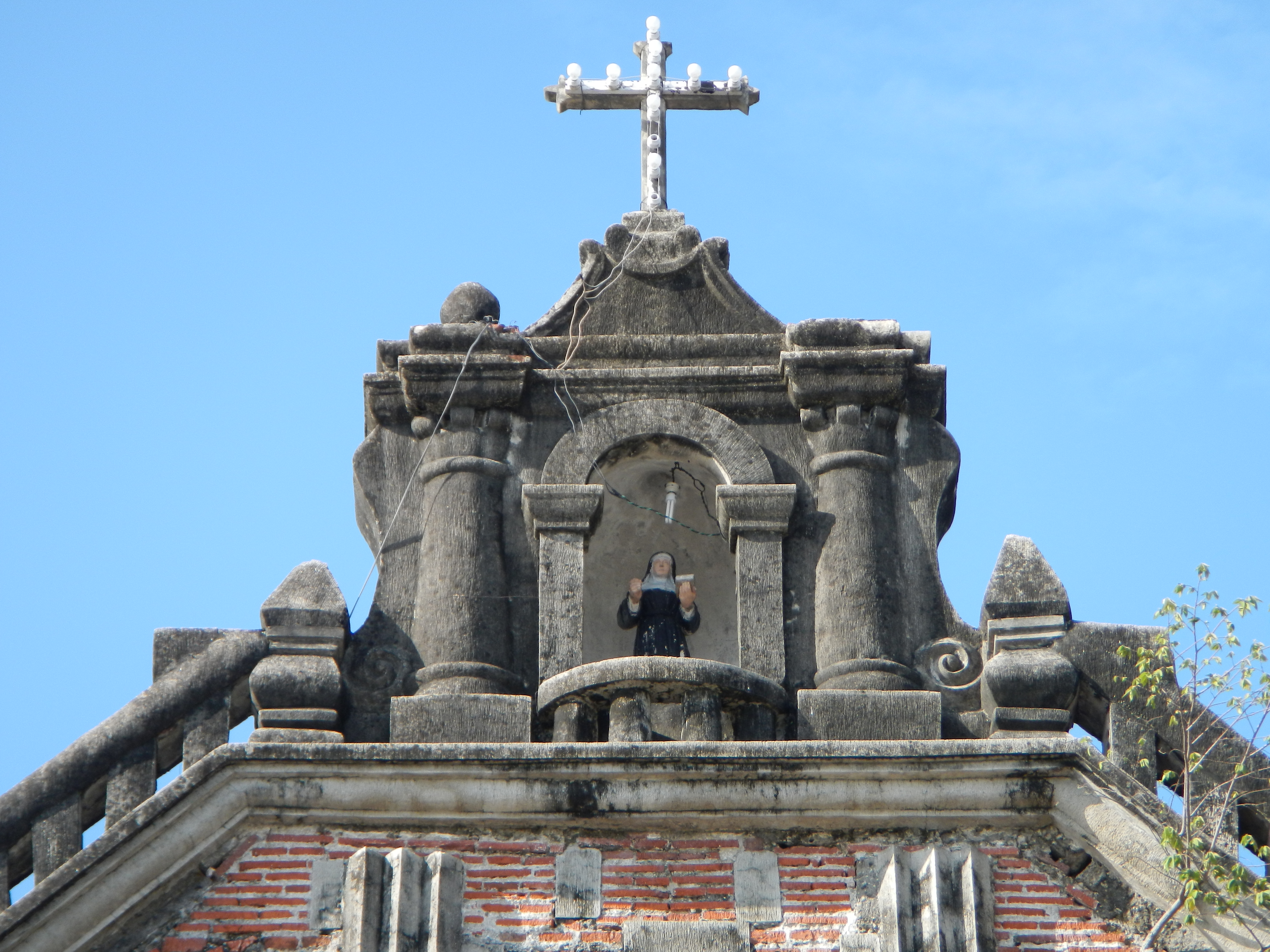
The cupola or roof lantern of the facade with the Cross

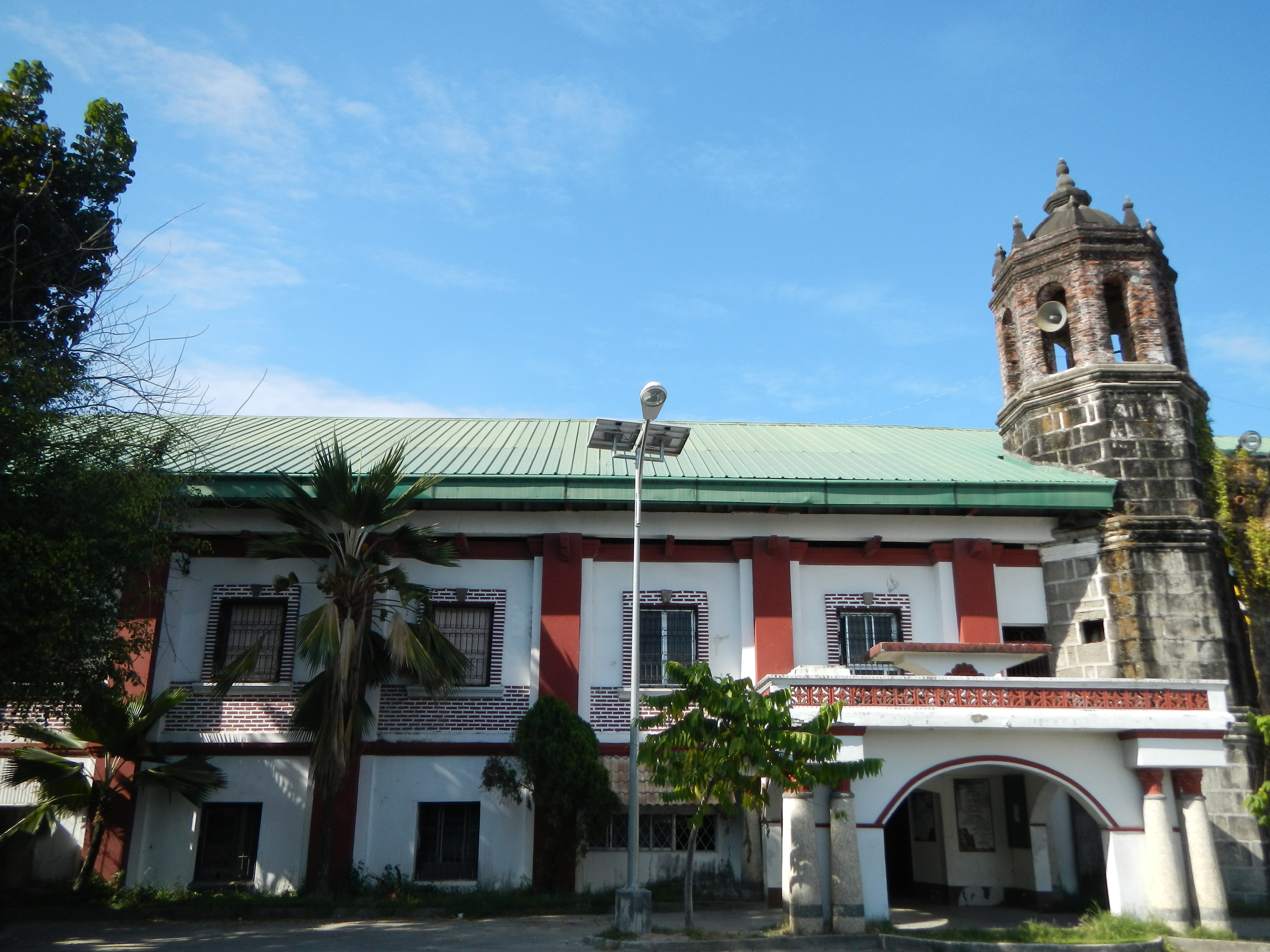
Left belfry and Convent, Parish Rectory-Office

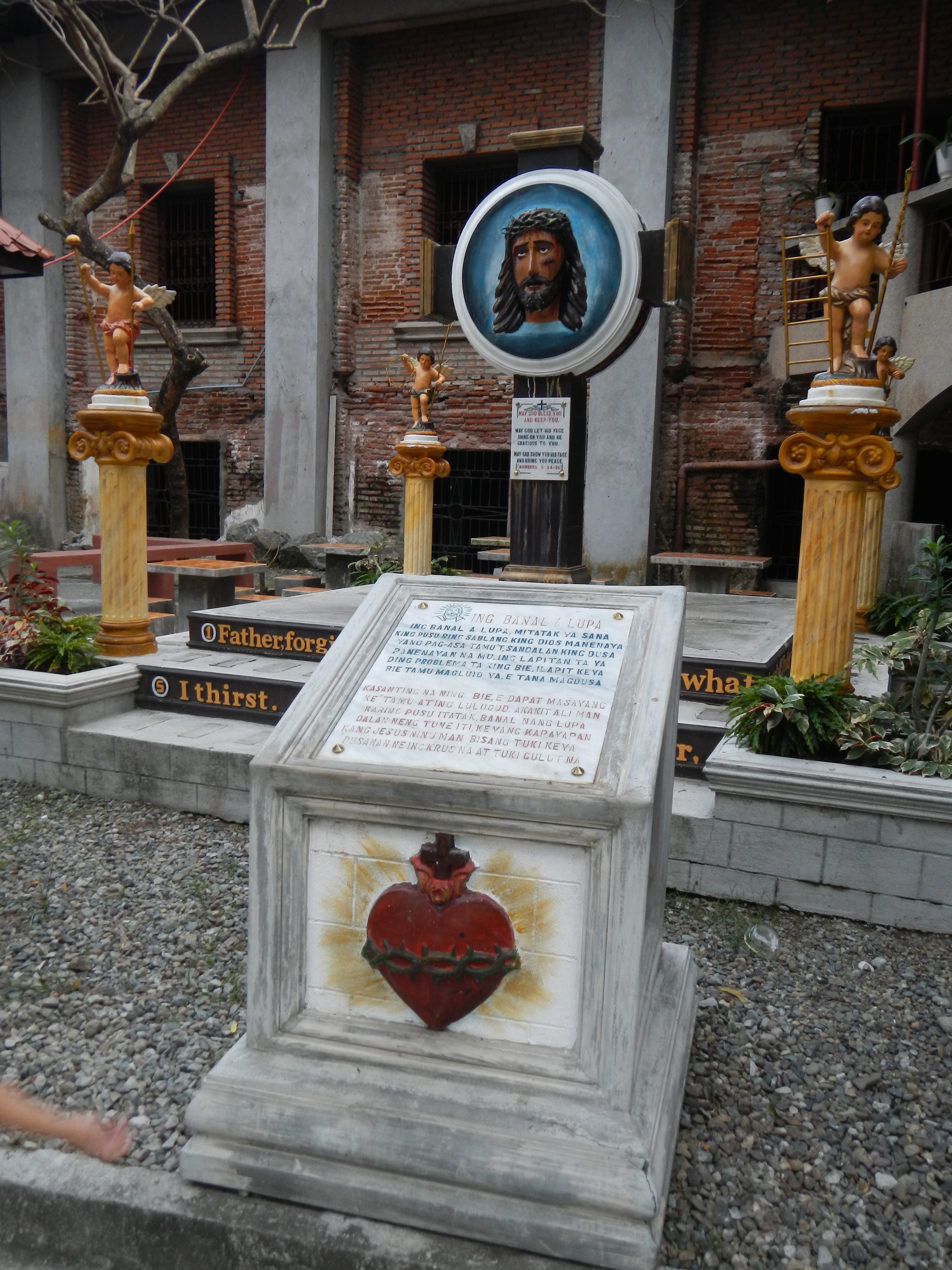
Altar of The Unborn
Minalin Church interior

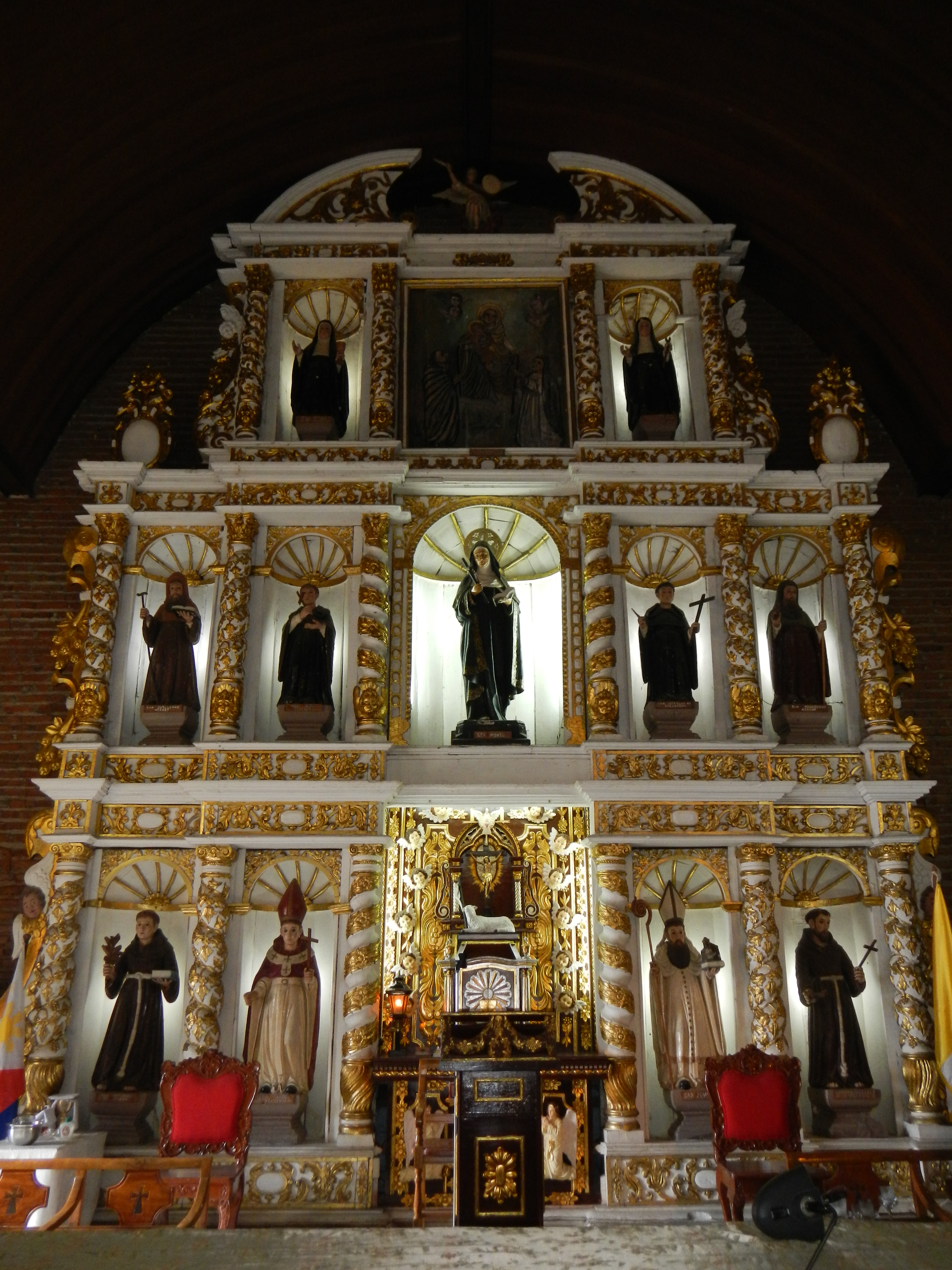
Reredos of the Saint Monica Church

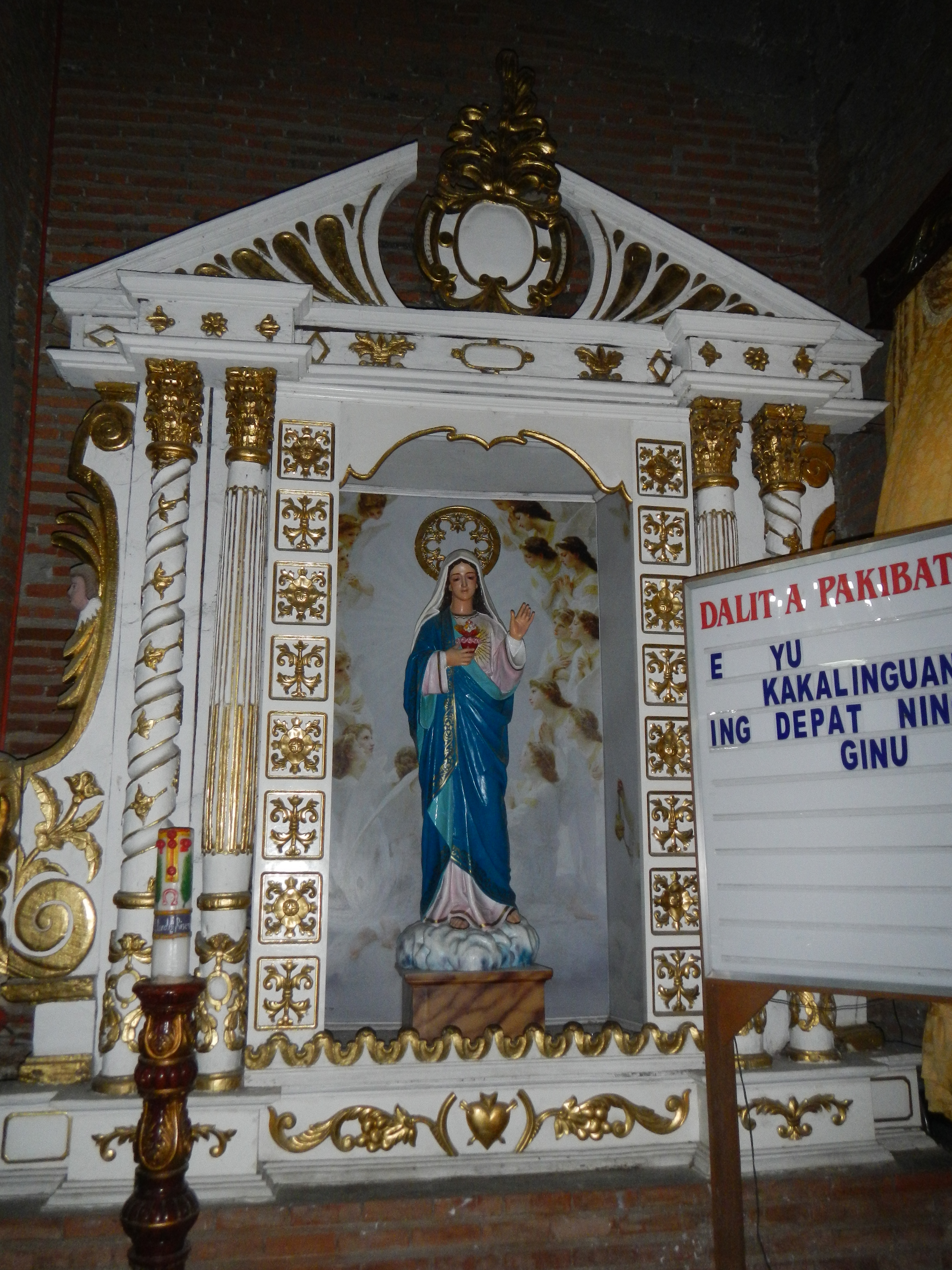
Altar of the Immaculate Heart of Mary

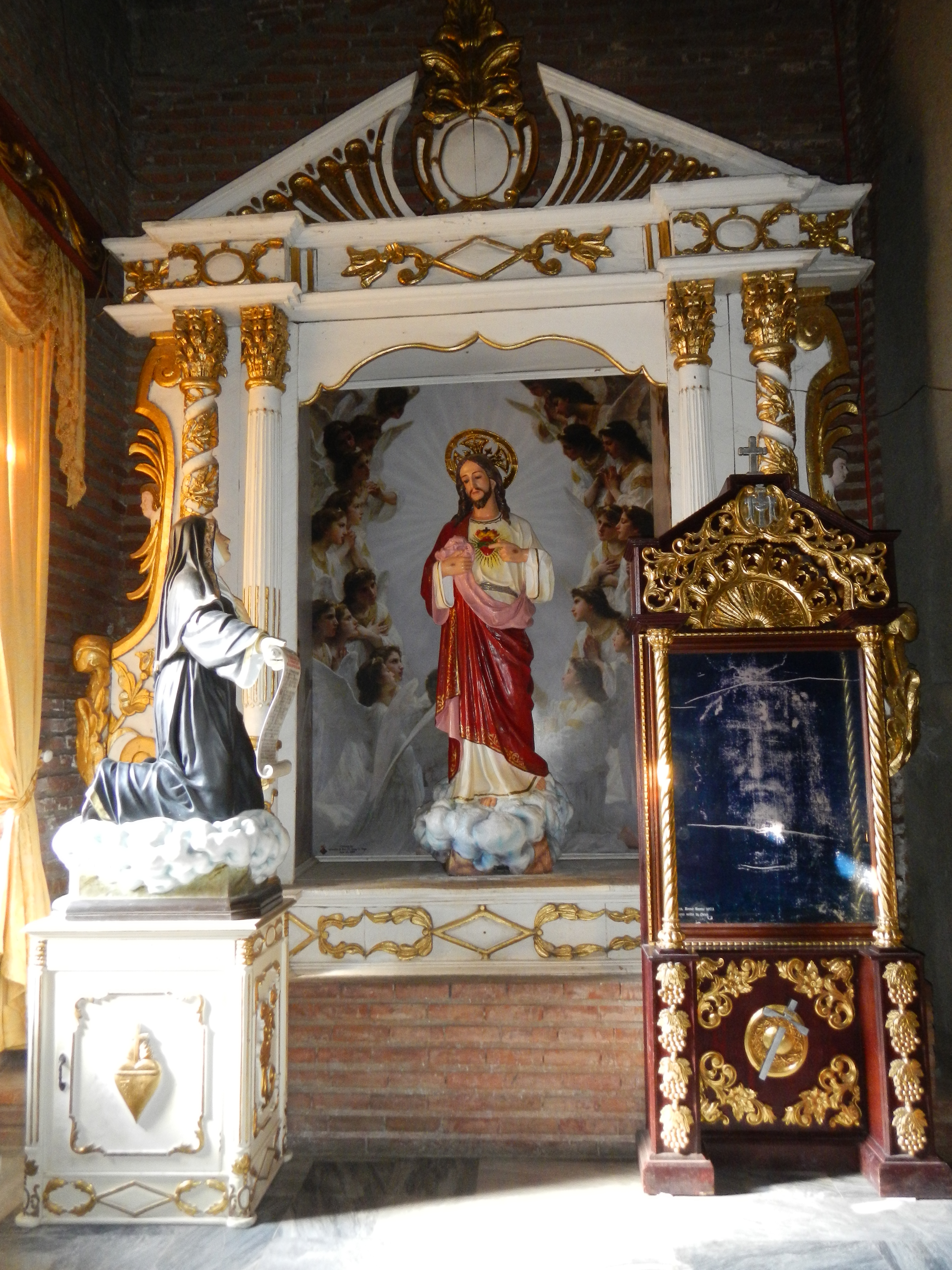
Altar of the Sacred Heart of Jesus

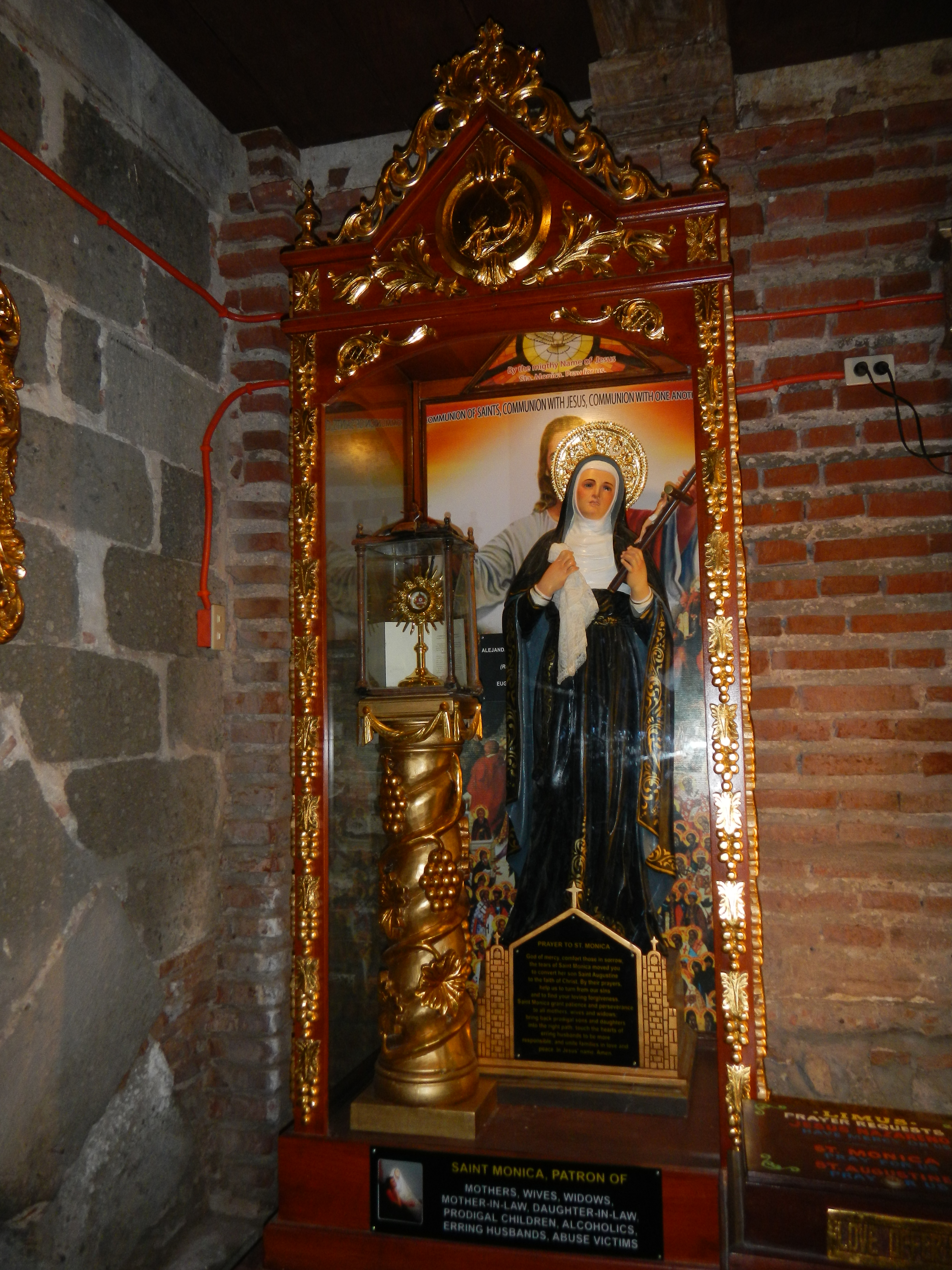
The statue and relic of Saint Monica

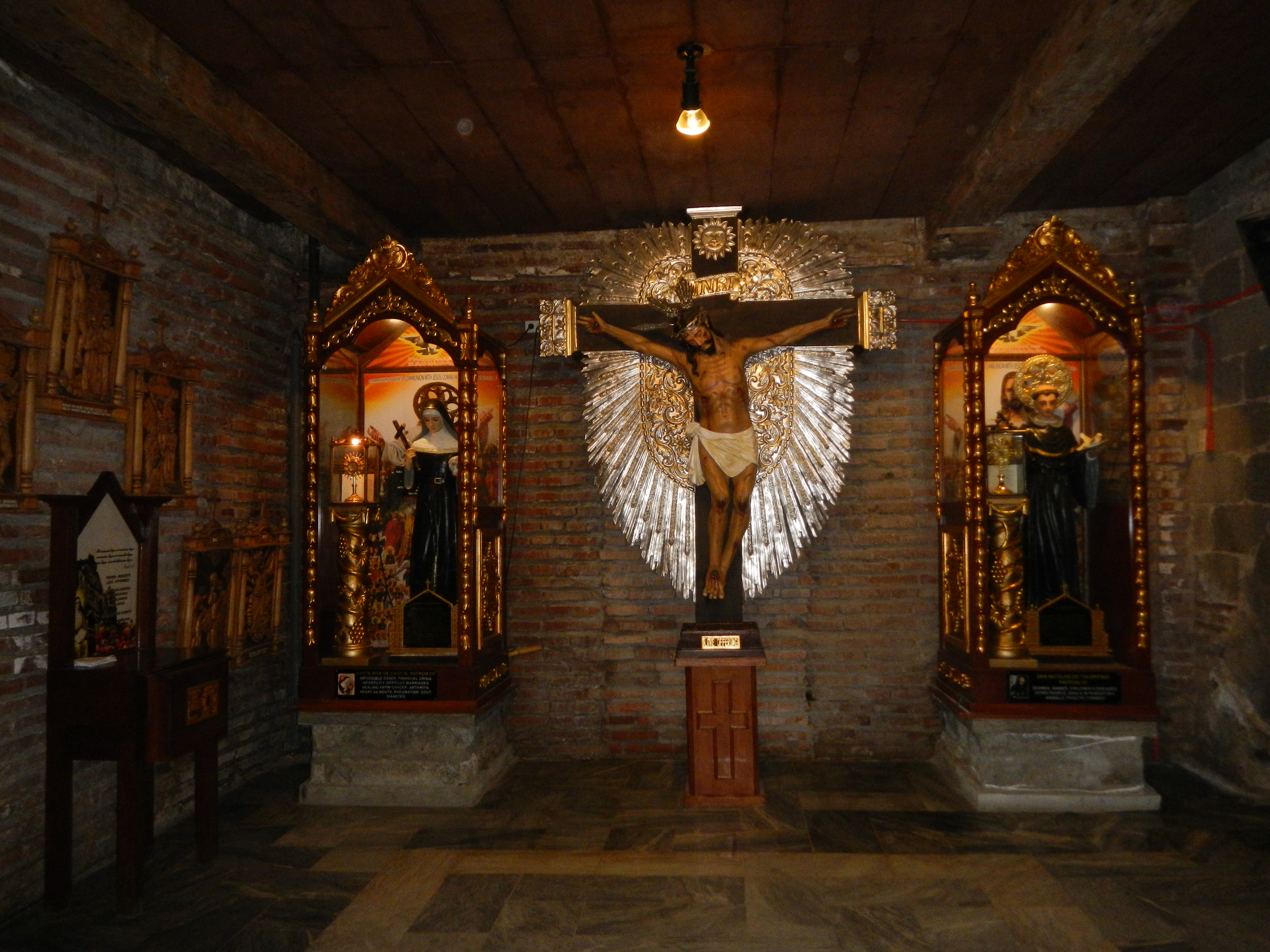
Altar of crucified Christ
Church Museum

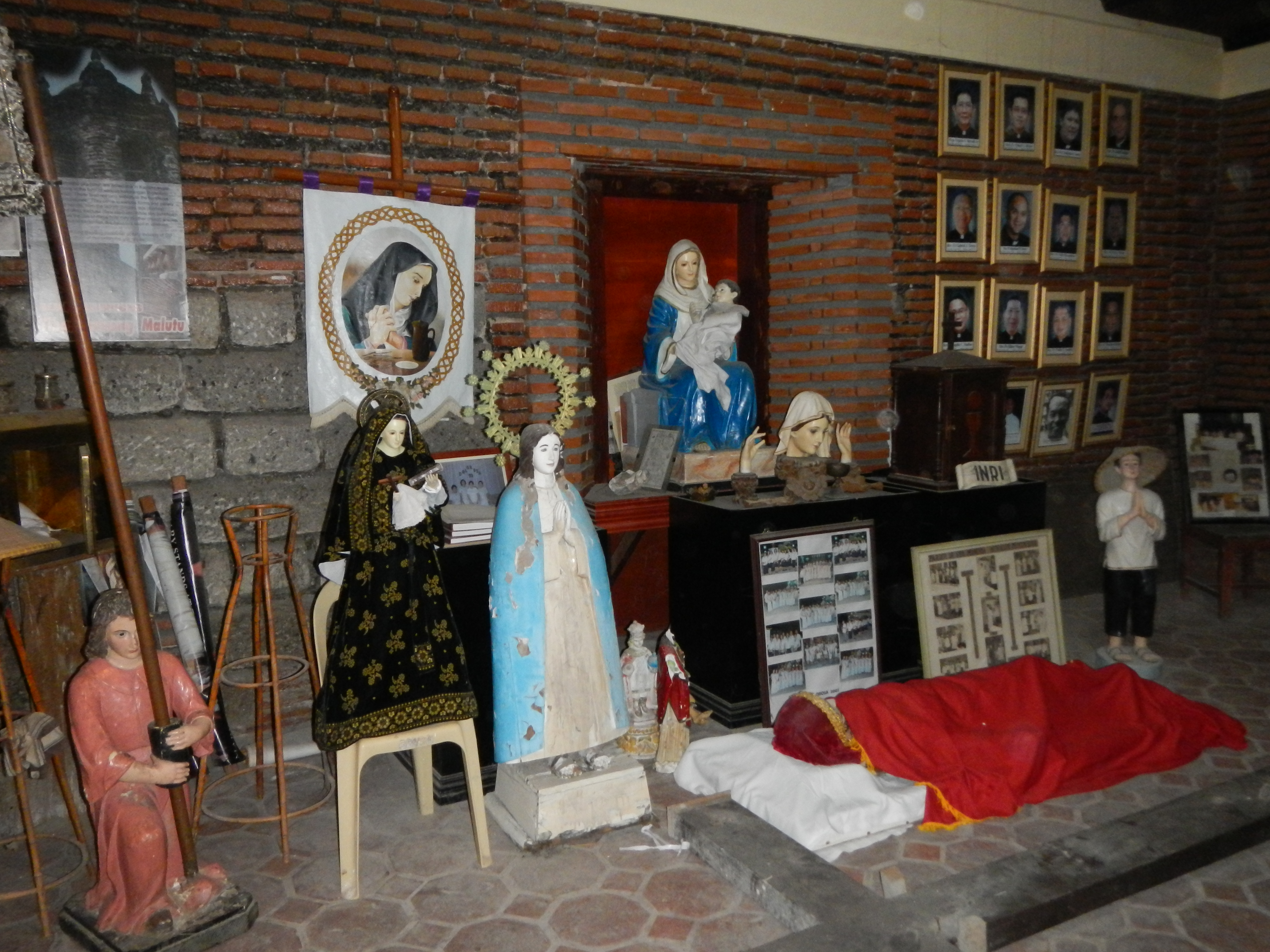
Images of saints at the museum

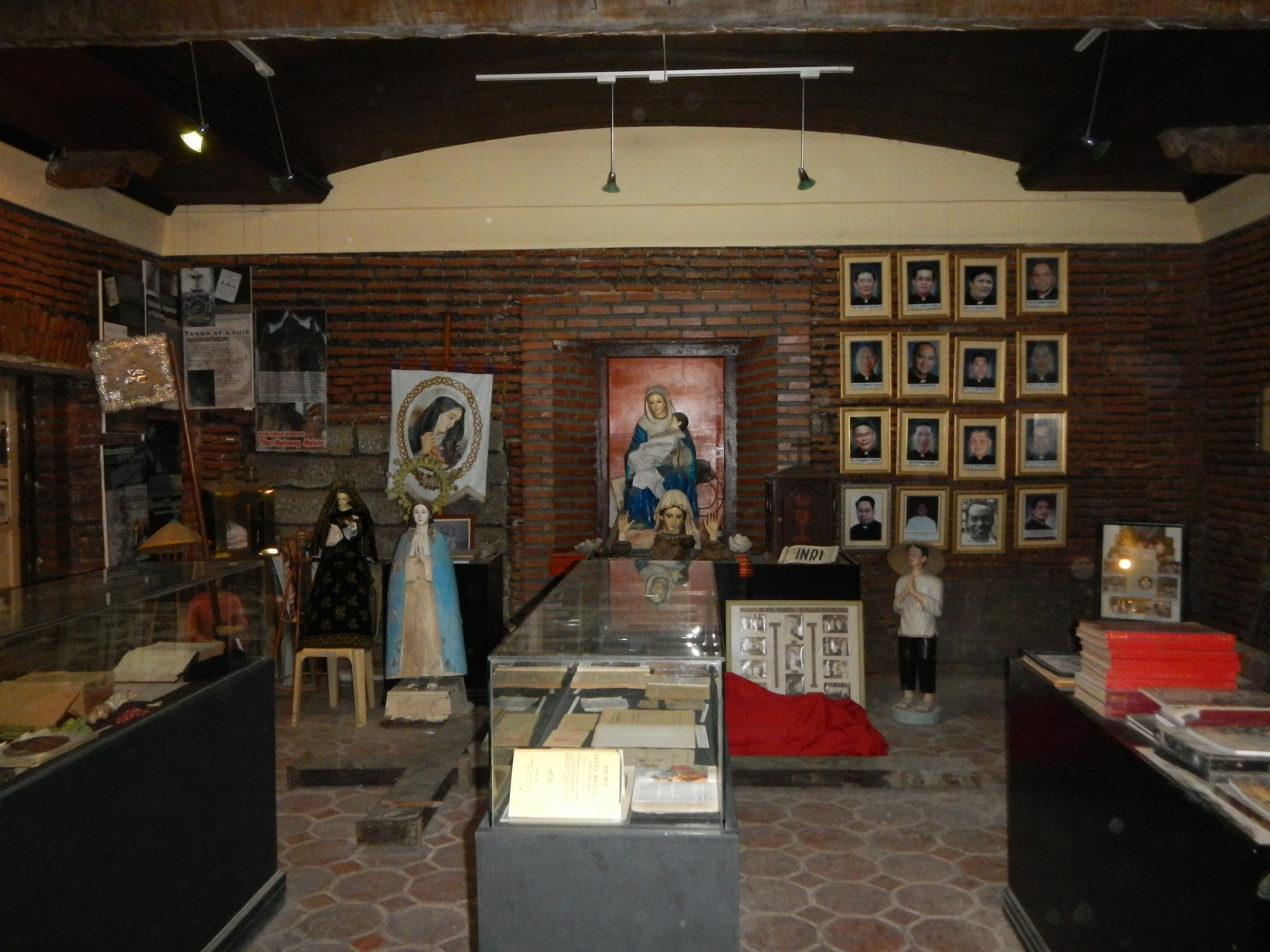
Documents and memorabilia

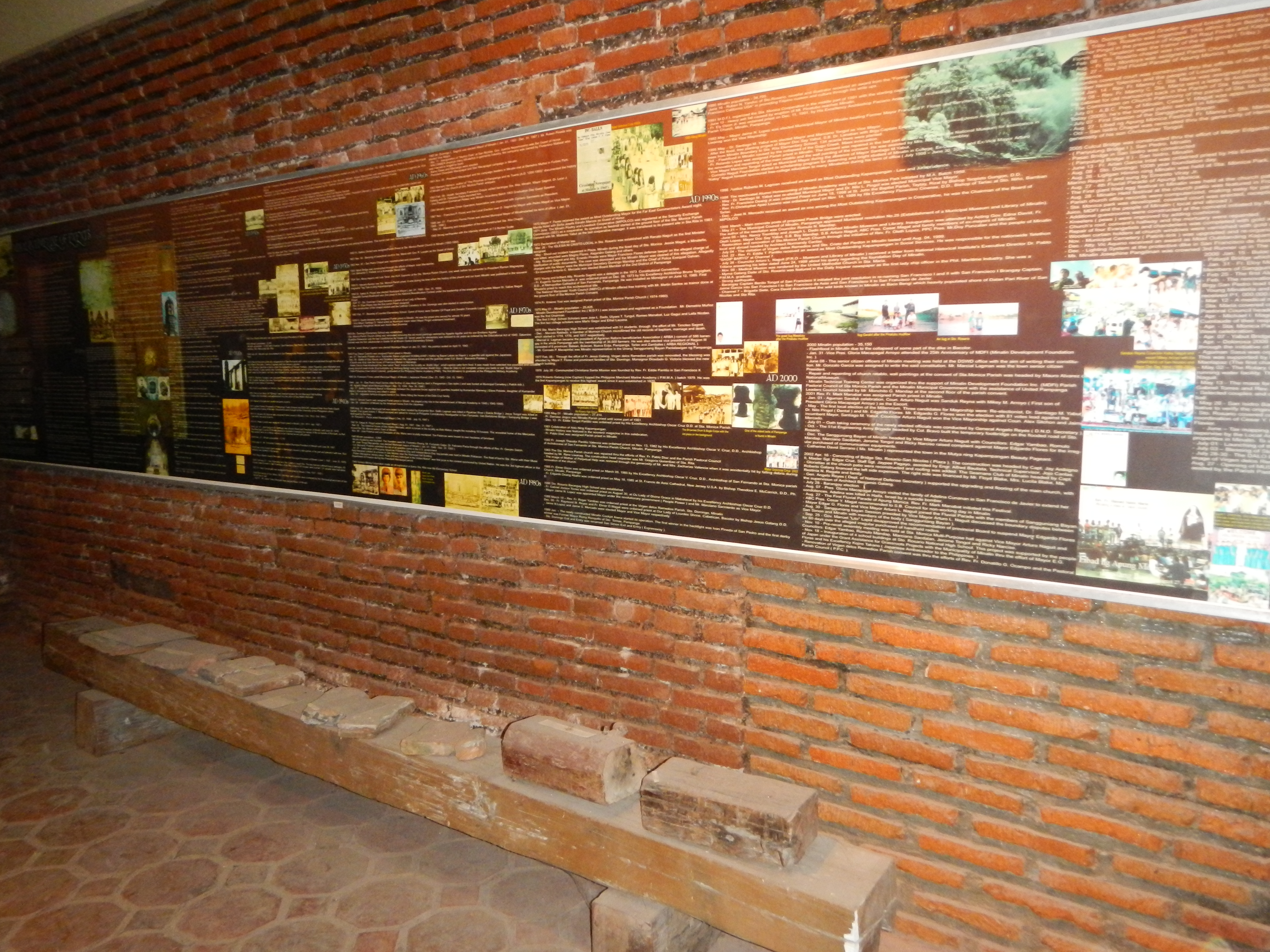
The relics of the past, history

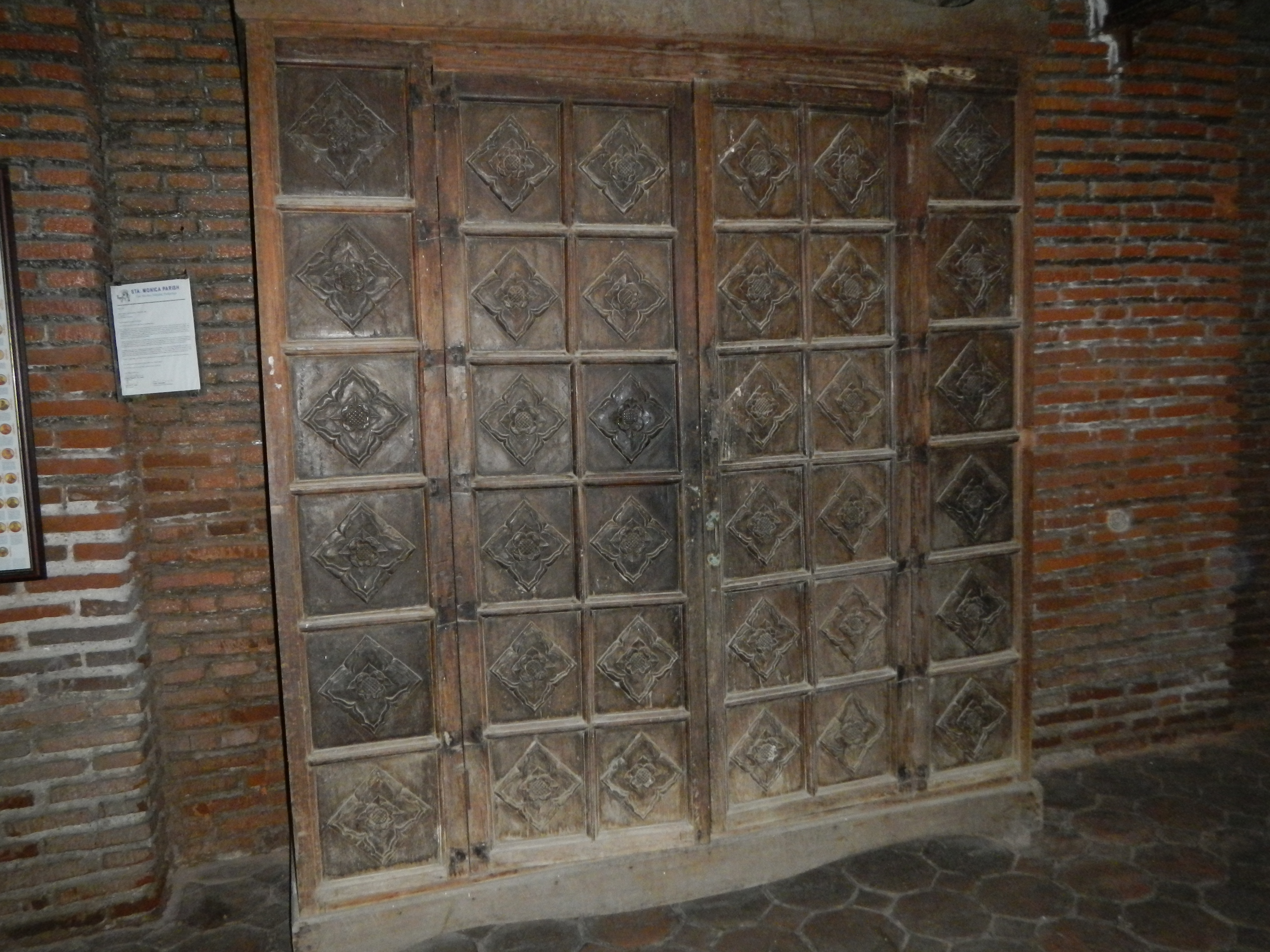
Ancient cabinet, museum exterior

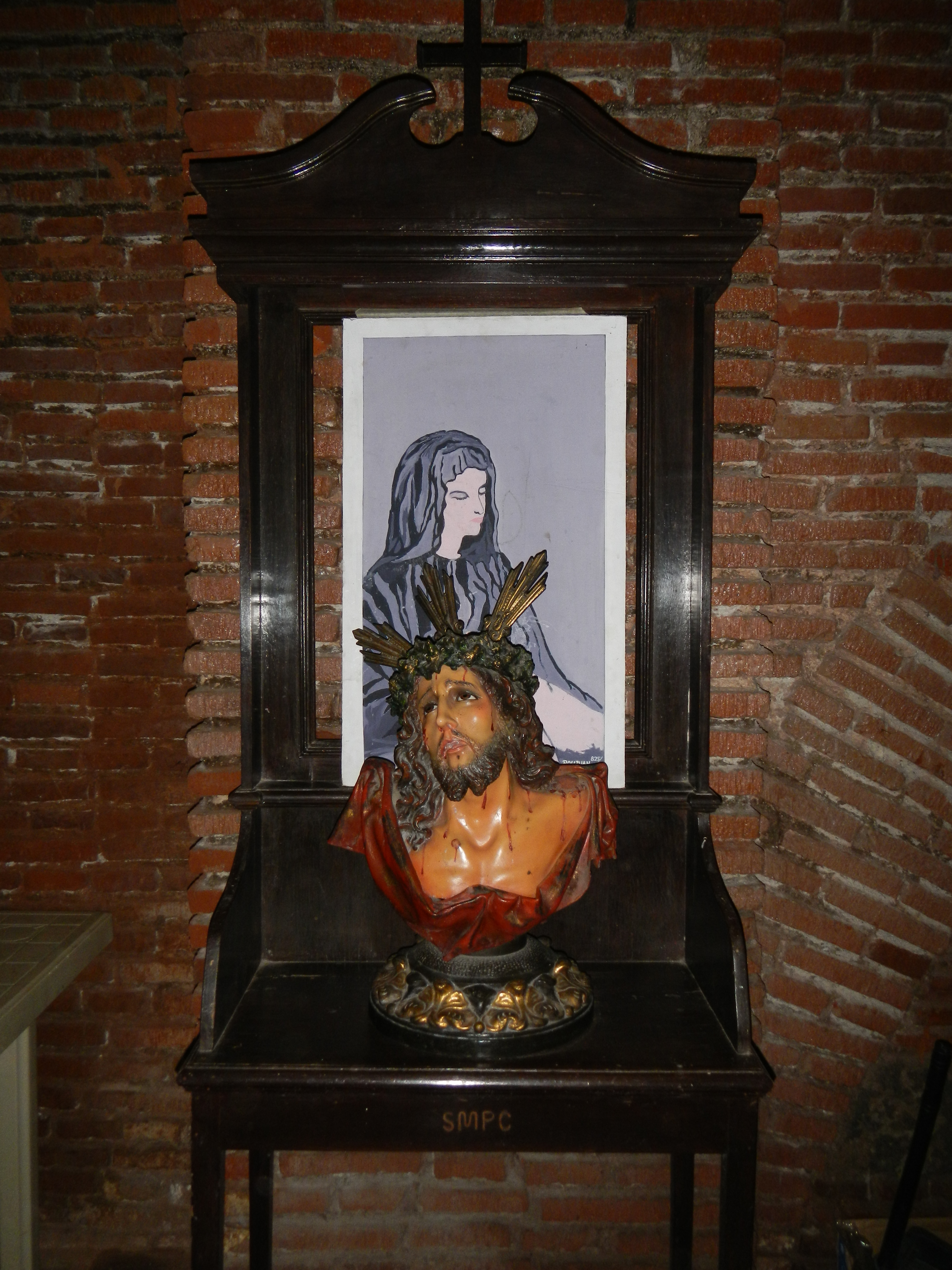
Mater Dolorosa and bust of Jesus with the crown of thorns
