= Nuestra Señora de la Merced Parish =

Roman Catholic church in Pampanga, Philippines

Nuestra Señora de la Merced Parish Church
- Parokya ng Nuestra Señora de la Merced (Filipino)
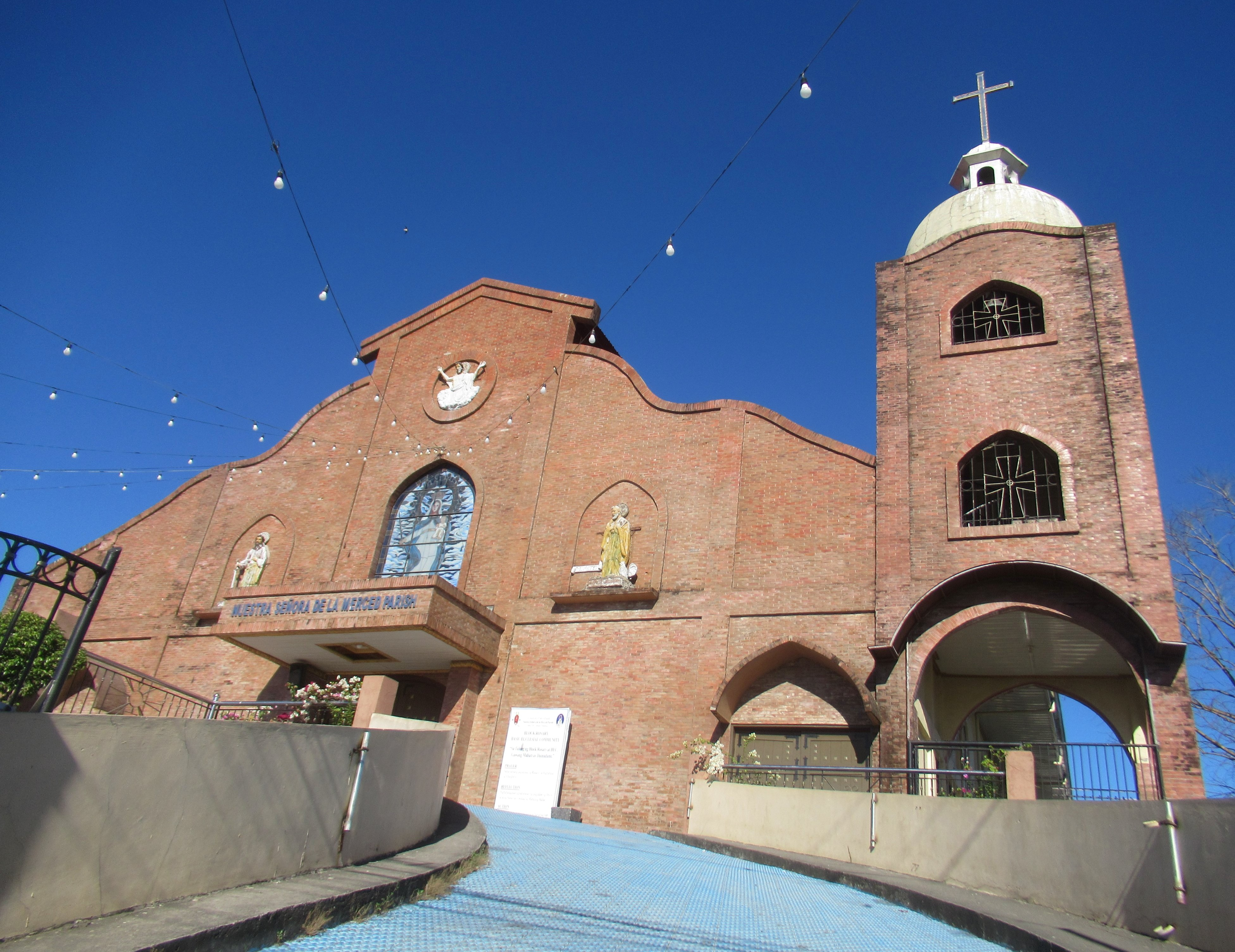
- Church facade in 2024

- Location in Luzon Location in the Philippines
- 15°01′50″N 120°52′56″E
- Location: Bahay Pare, Candaba, Pampanga
- Country: Philippines
- Denomination: Roman Catholic

History
- Status: Parish church
- Founded: April 26, 1937
- Dedicated: April 28, 2018

Architecture
- Functional status: Active
- Architectural type: Church building

Administration
- Archdiocese: San Fernando

Clergy
- Archbishop: Florentino Lavarias
- Priest(s): Rev. Fr. John Paul P. Cabrera, V.F.

Nuestra Señora de la Merced Parish Church is a Roman Catholic church located in Bahay Pare, Candaba, Pampanga in the Philippines. The parish church is under the Archdiocese of San Fernando, Pampanga and is the home of the Nuestra Señora de la Merced de Pampanga, Emperatriz na Marilag sa Katagalugan ng Pampanga, which is the oldest and original image of the title. Devotees flock to the parish to ask Mary to intercede for their spiritual, mental, and physical health, for their families and studies, and for the increase of vocations to the priesthood and consecrated life. The parish covers most of the barangays of the Tagalog region under the patronage of Nuestra Señora dela Merced. The image is well known for her Dalit as She visits different places. The parish also holds first class relics of Mercedarian Saints, St. Peter Nolasco, St. Raymond of Penyafort, St. Serapion of Algiers, St. Raymond Nonnatus and St. Pedro Armengol.

== History ==
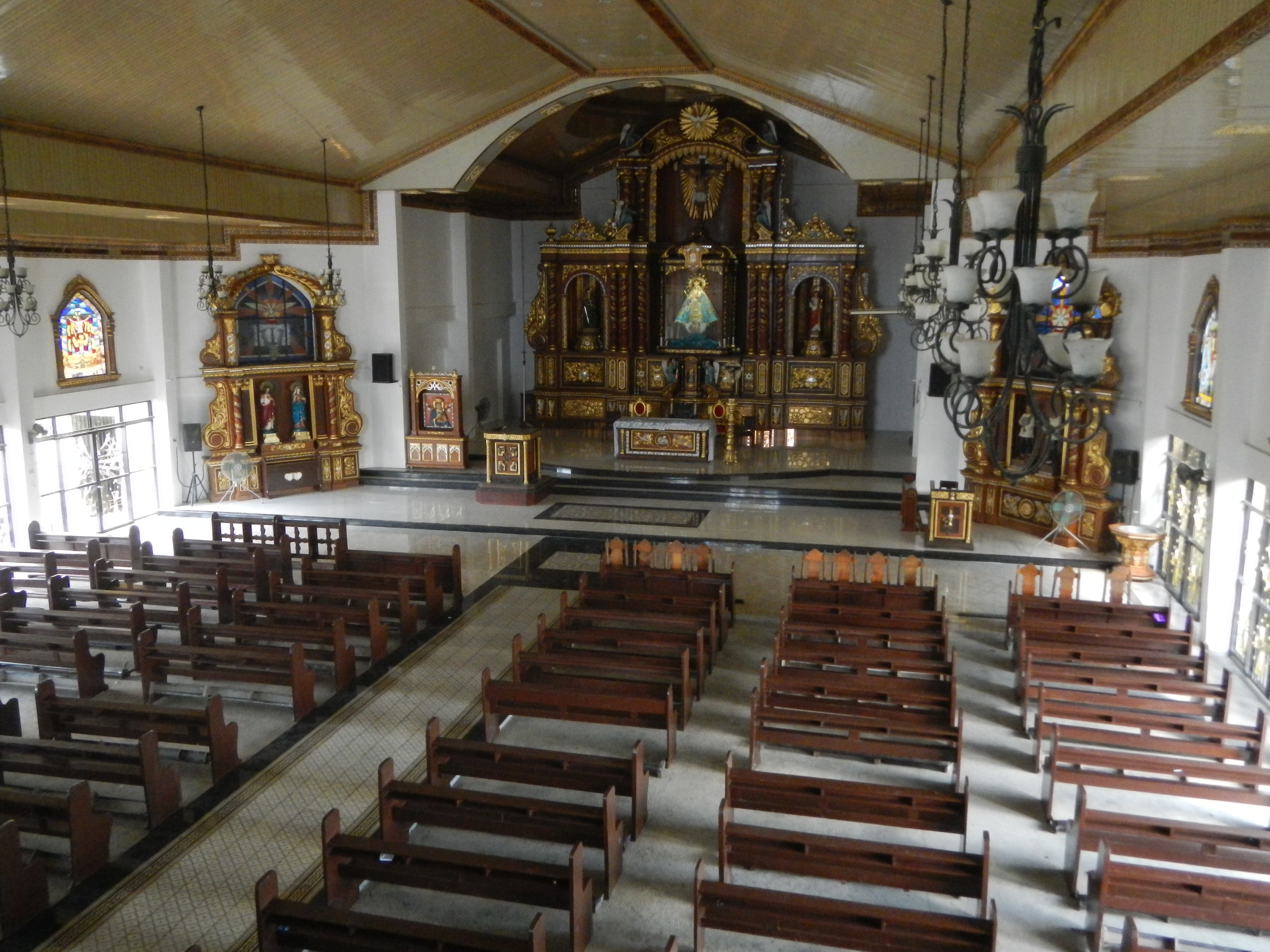
Church interior in 2016

During the Spanish times in Candaba, Pampanga, a story was told about three women in the nearby towns of Plaridel and Baliwag asking for help for the construction of their "house". When a carpenter from Plaridel visited the chapel in Bahay Pare, Candaba, he saw at the altar three statues who looked like the women who visited their town. They were Catherine of Alexandria, Nuestra Senora de la Merced and Saint Lucy.

After the Philippine Revolution, the chapel was subjected to Saint Augustine Parish Church (Baliwag). The chapel was established as a parish on April 26, 1937 when the Archbishop of Manila, Michael J. O'Doherty approved the petition of Rev. Fr. Ruperto T. del Rosario, the parish priest of Baliwag.

== Nuestra Señora de la Merced de Pampanga ==
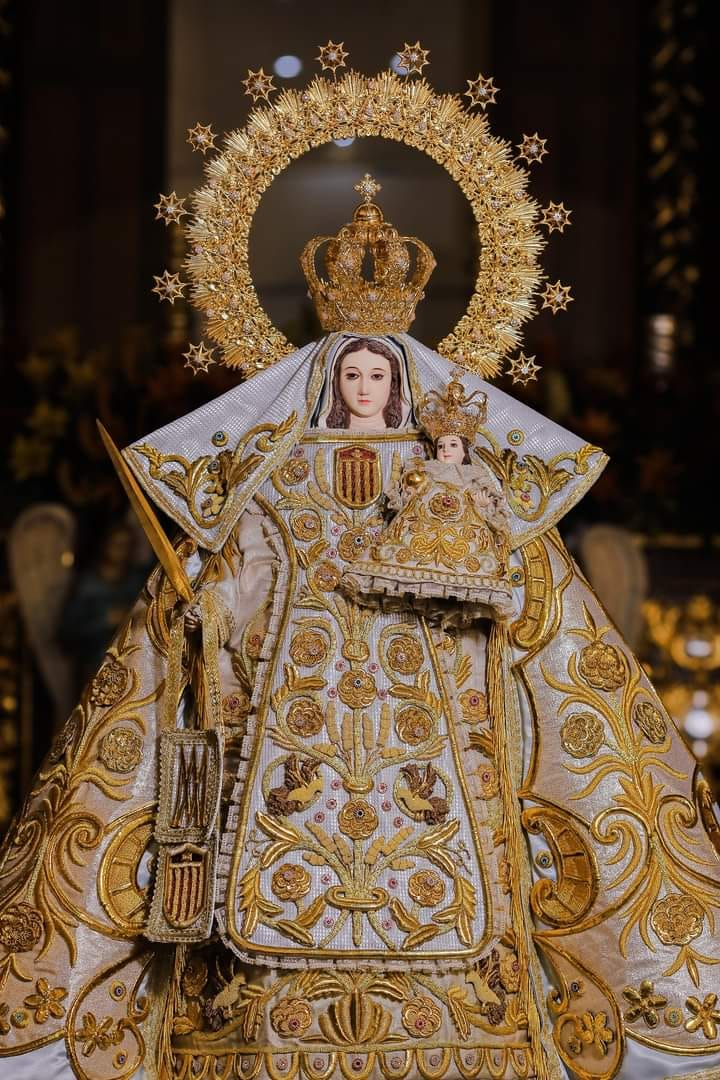
Nuestra Señora de la Merced de Pampanga

Our Lady of Mercy of Pampanga (Spanish: Nuestra Señora de la Merced de Pampanga; Filipino: Mahal na Birhen ng Awa ng Pampanga), also known as the "Emperatriz na Marilag sa Katagalugan ng Pampanga" (English: Majestic Empress of the Tagalog Region of Pampanga) is an image of the Virgin Mary in her title of Our Lady of Mercy venerated in her parish in Bahay Pare, Candaba, Pampanga, Philippines.

It is the oldest and original image of the title in the Philippines. She is also known as "Apung de la Merced" and "Nuestra". Her feast day is celebrated every September 24, the title's liturgical feast in the General Roman Calendar.

== 800th Anniversary of the Apparition of Our Lady of Mercy ==
Dozens from Pampanga's Tagalog villages in Candaba as well as devotees from Tarlac and Manila joined this year’s jubilee celebration in honor of the 800th year founding anniversary of the Mercedarian Order under the patronage of the Blessed Virgin Mary under the title Nuestra Señora dela Merced.

Dozens of devotees joined the solemn mass last August 2 at the Virgen dela Merced Parish in Bahay Pare. The devotees later showed their deep devotion to the blessed virgin by accompanying the venerated images of the Holy Mother from Tarlac, Manila and Samar through the processional routes of the parish.

The Marian Shrine was solemnly dedicated on April 28, 2018, by Florentino Lavarias, with former Parish Priest, Fr. Stephen B. Susi and incumbent Fr. Pedrito M. Sitchon.

== Gallery ==
Church interior

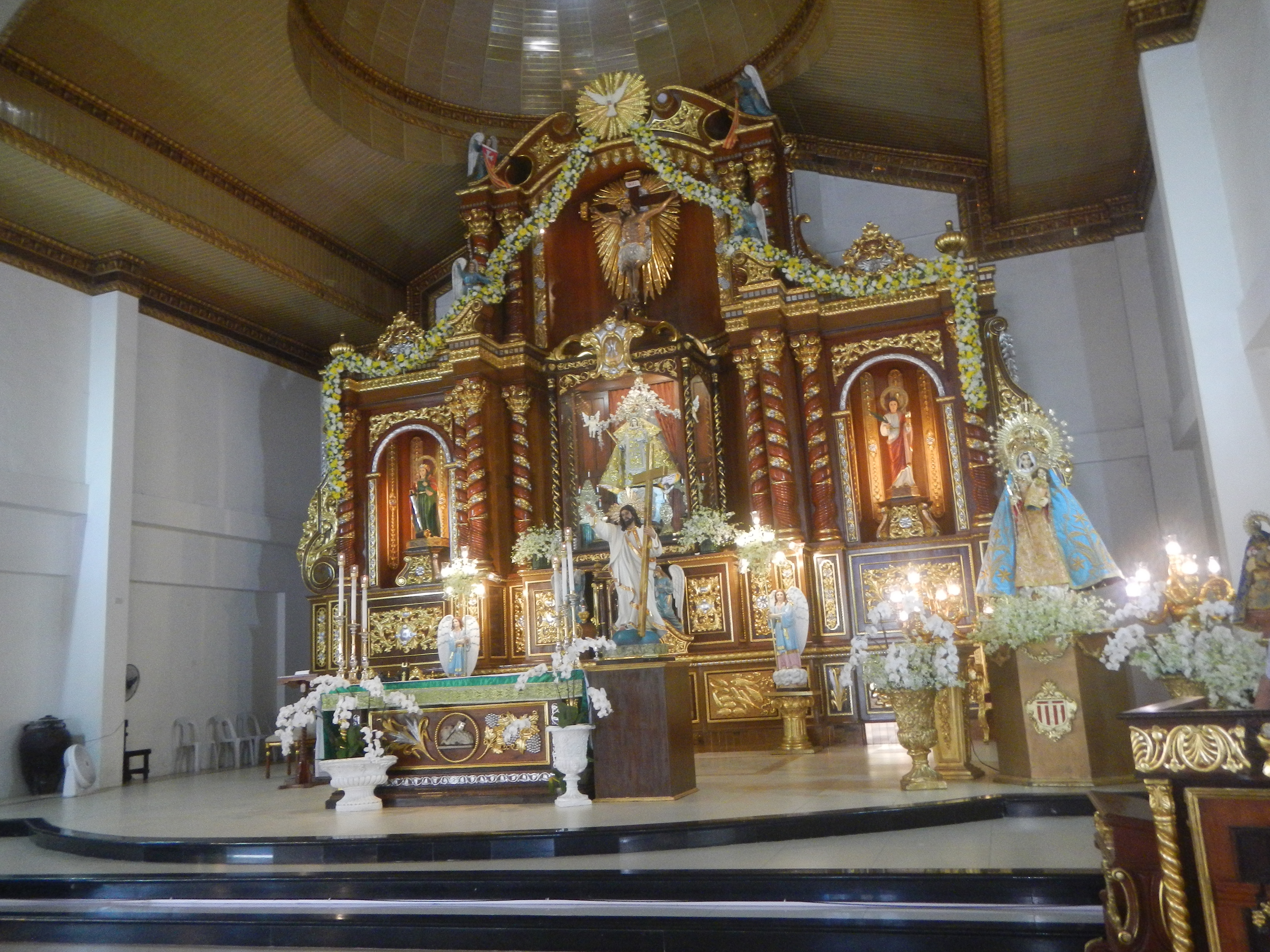
Main retablo

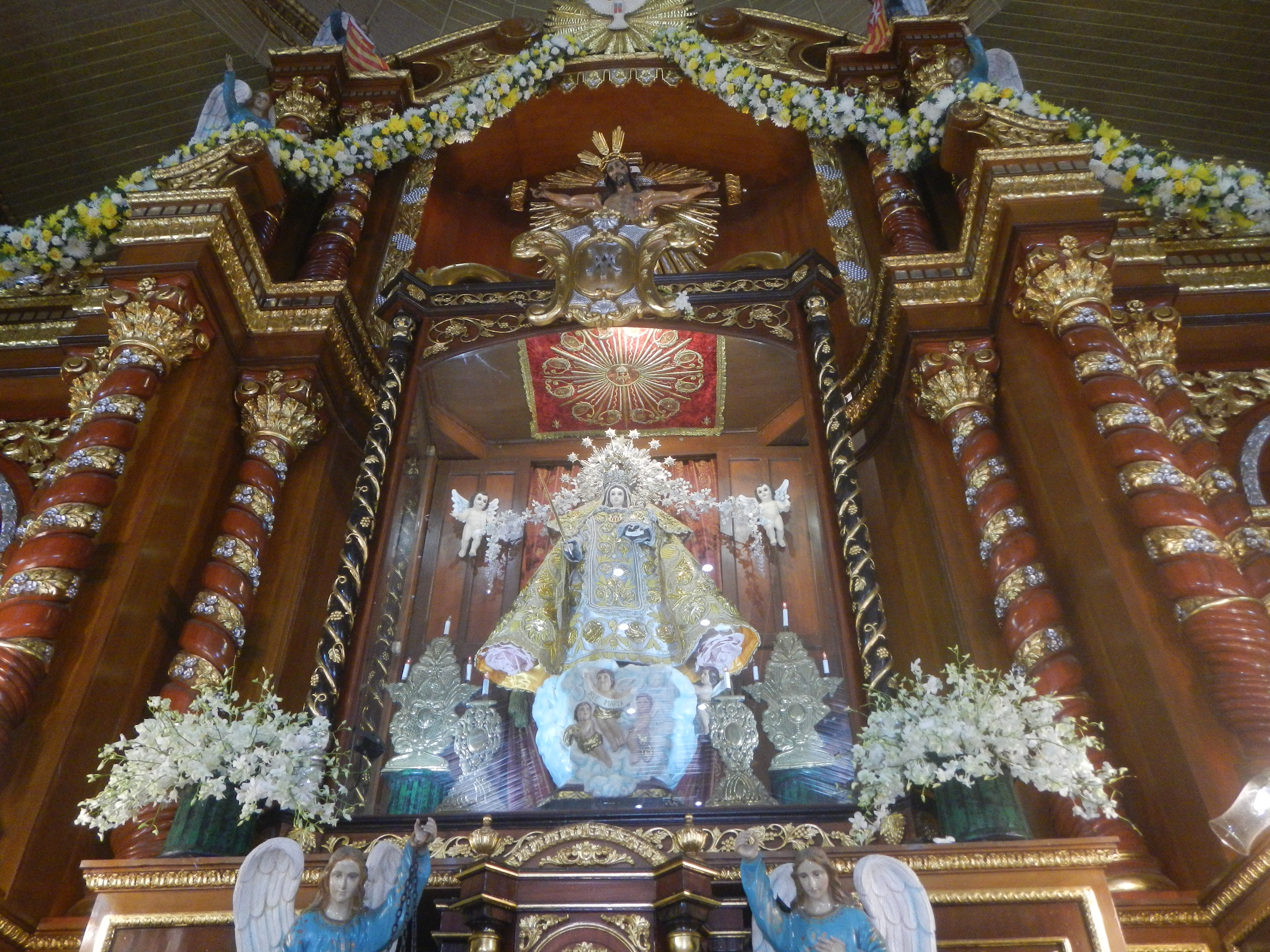
Original image of Nuestra Señora de la Merced de Pampanga

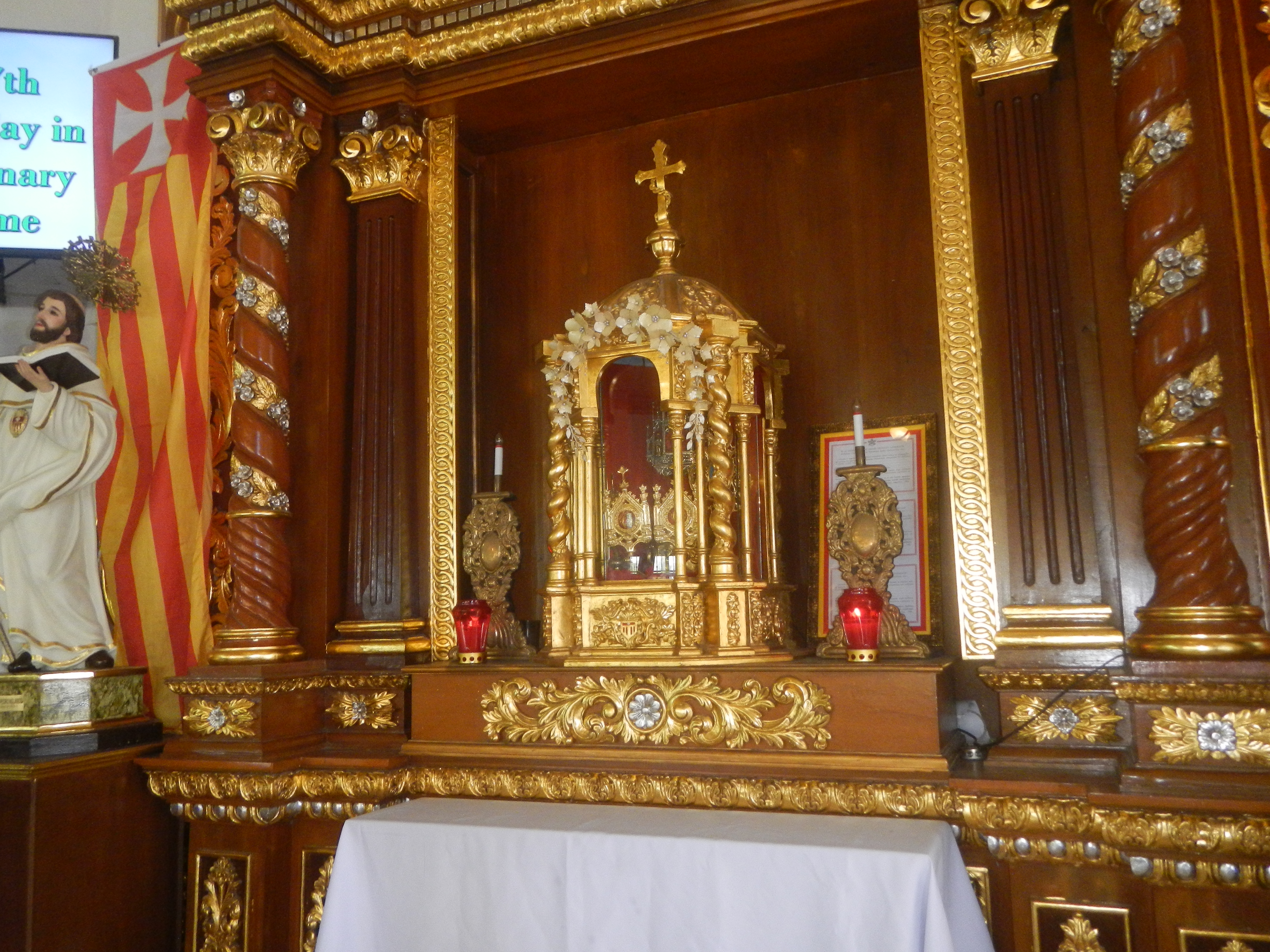
First class relics of Mercedarian Saints

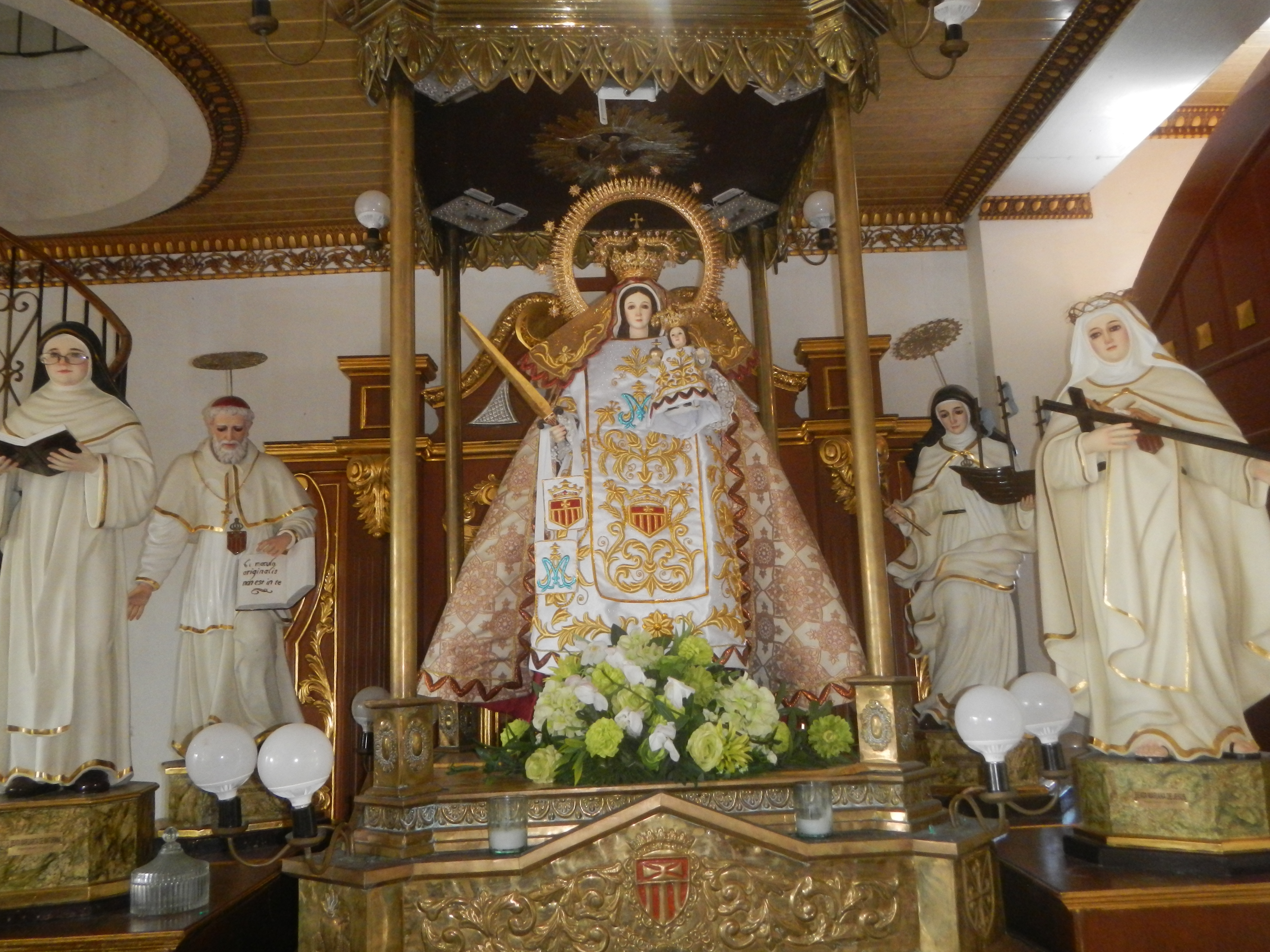
Official replica of Nuestra Señora de la Merced with Mercedarian Blesseds and Saints

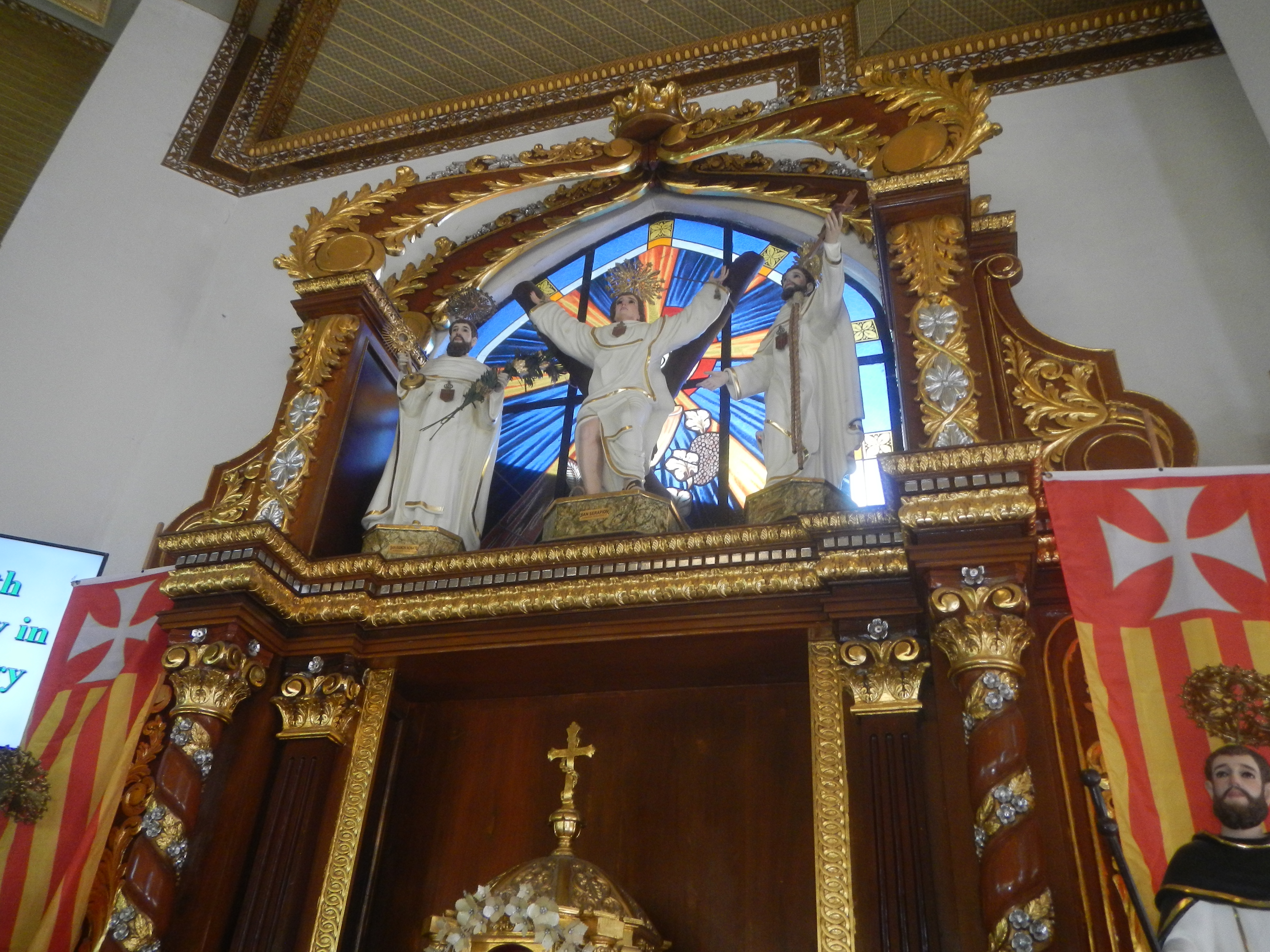
Side retablo with Mercedarian Saints

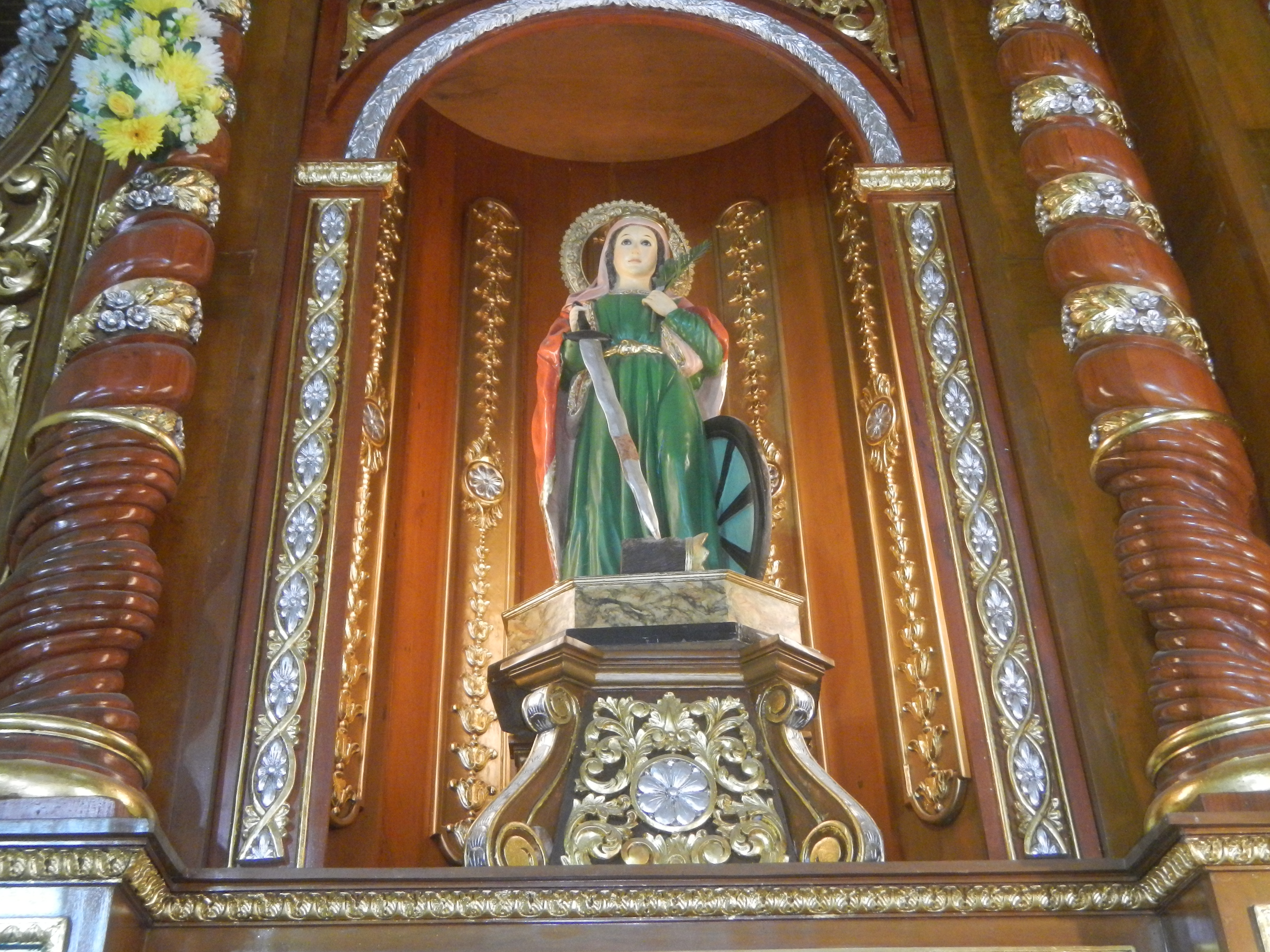
Santa Catalina de Alejandria

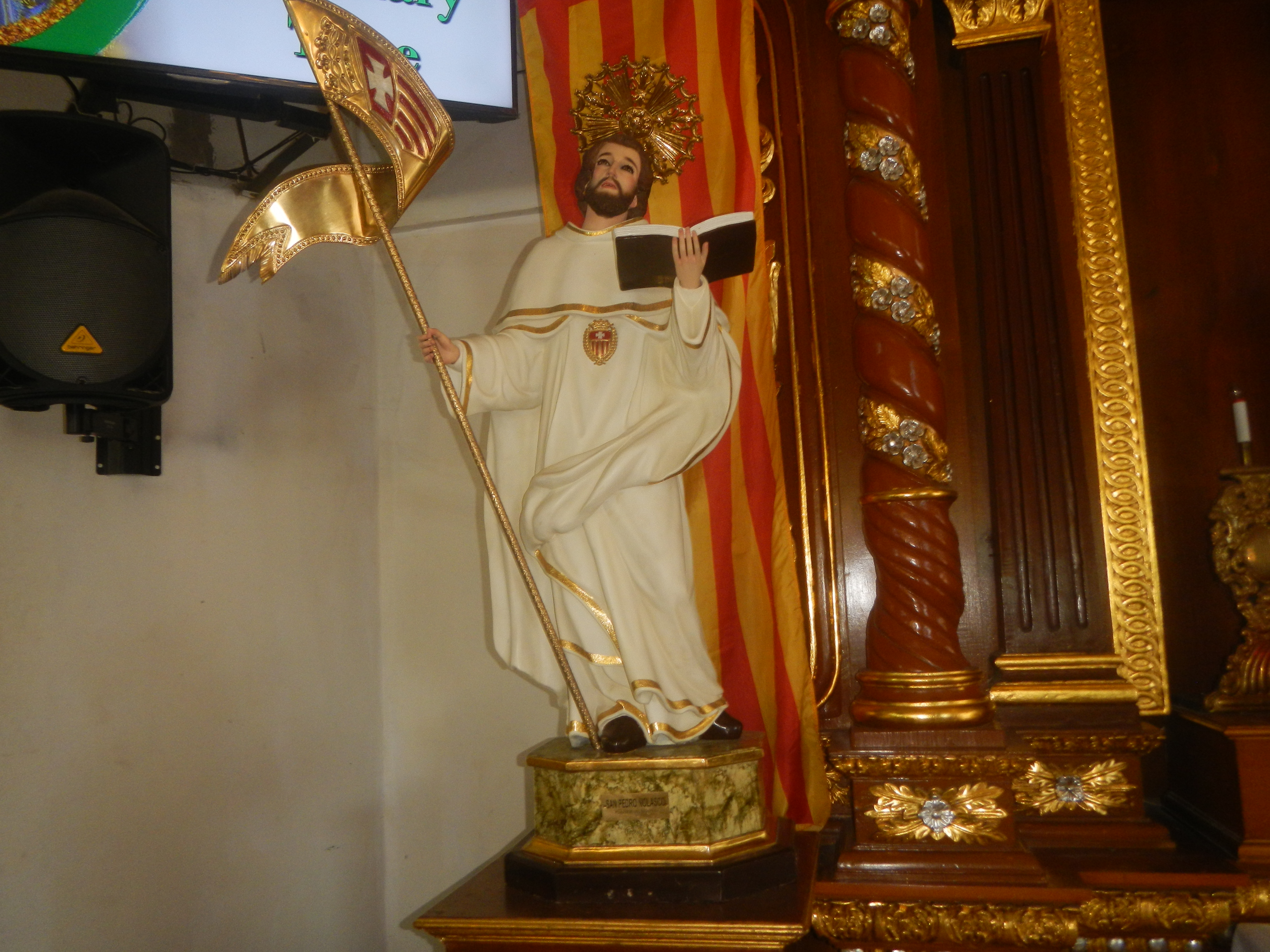
San Pedro Nolasco

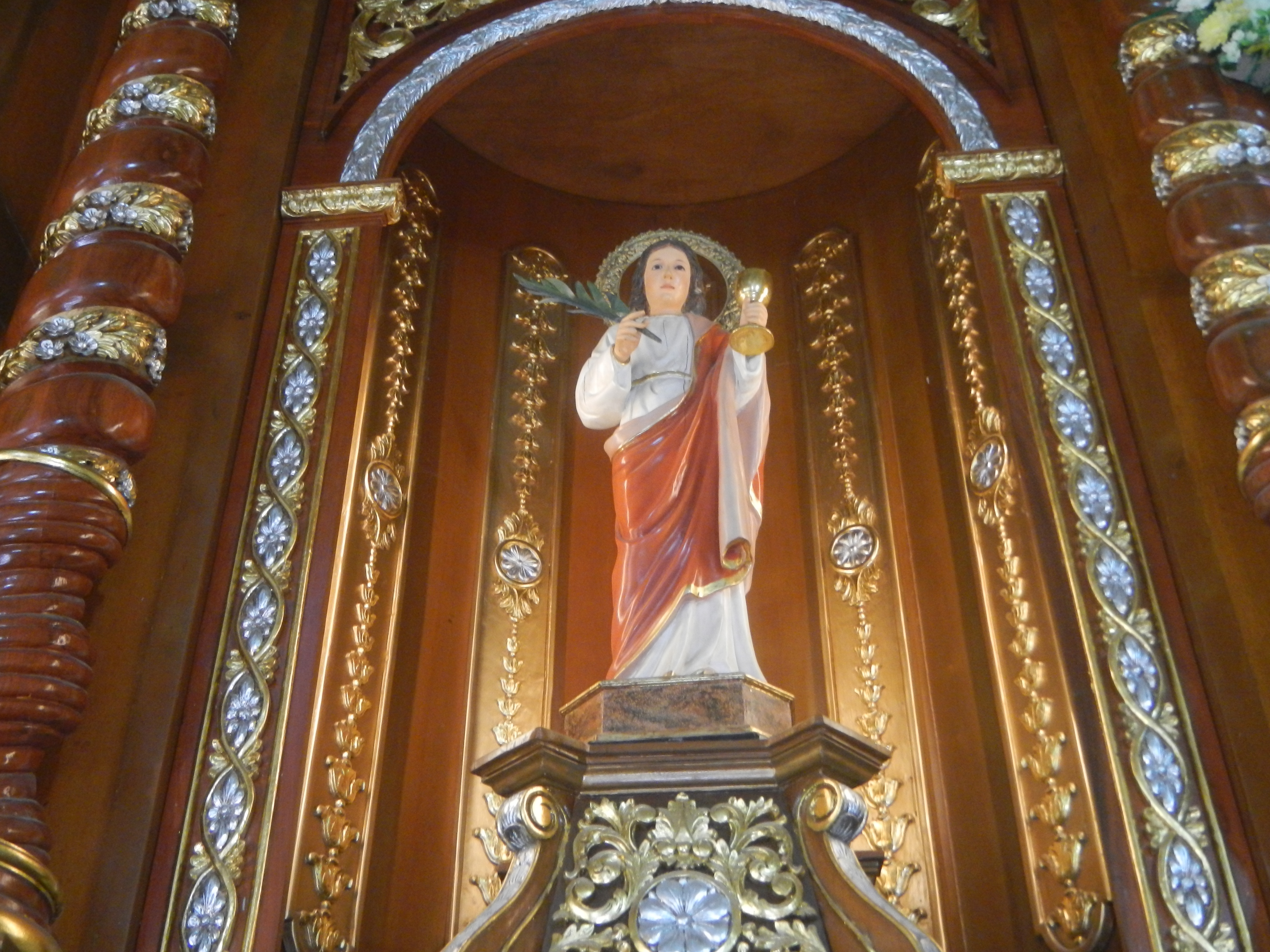
Santa Lucia

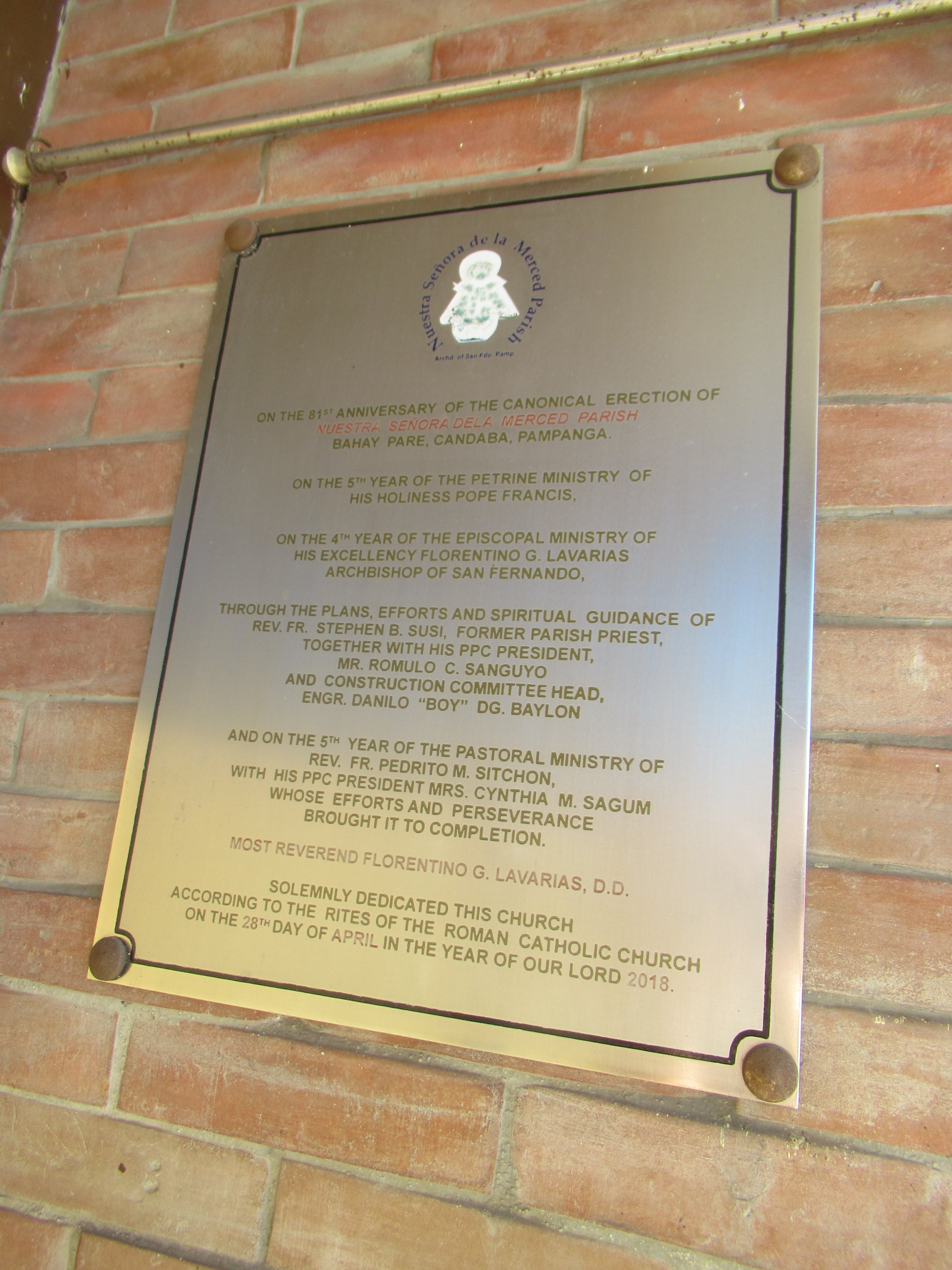
Historical markers of 2018 Solemnly Dedicated

== See also ==
- San Andres Apostol Church (Candaba)
