= San Andres Apostol Church (Candaba) =

Roman Catholic church in Pampanga, Philippines

Candaba Church
- San Andres Apostol Parish Church
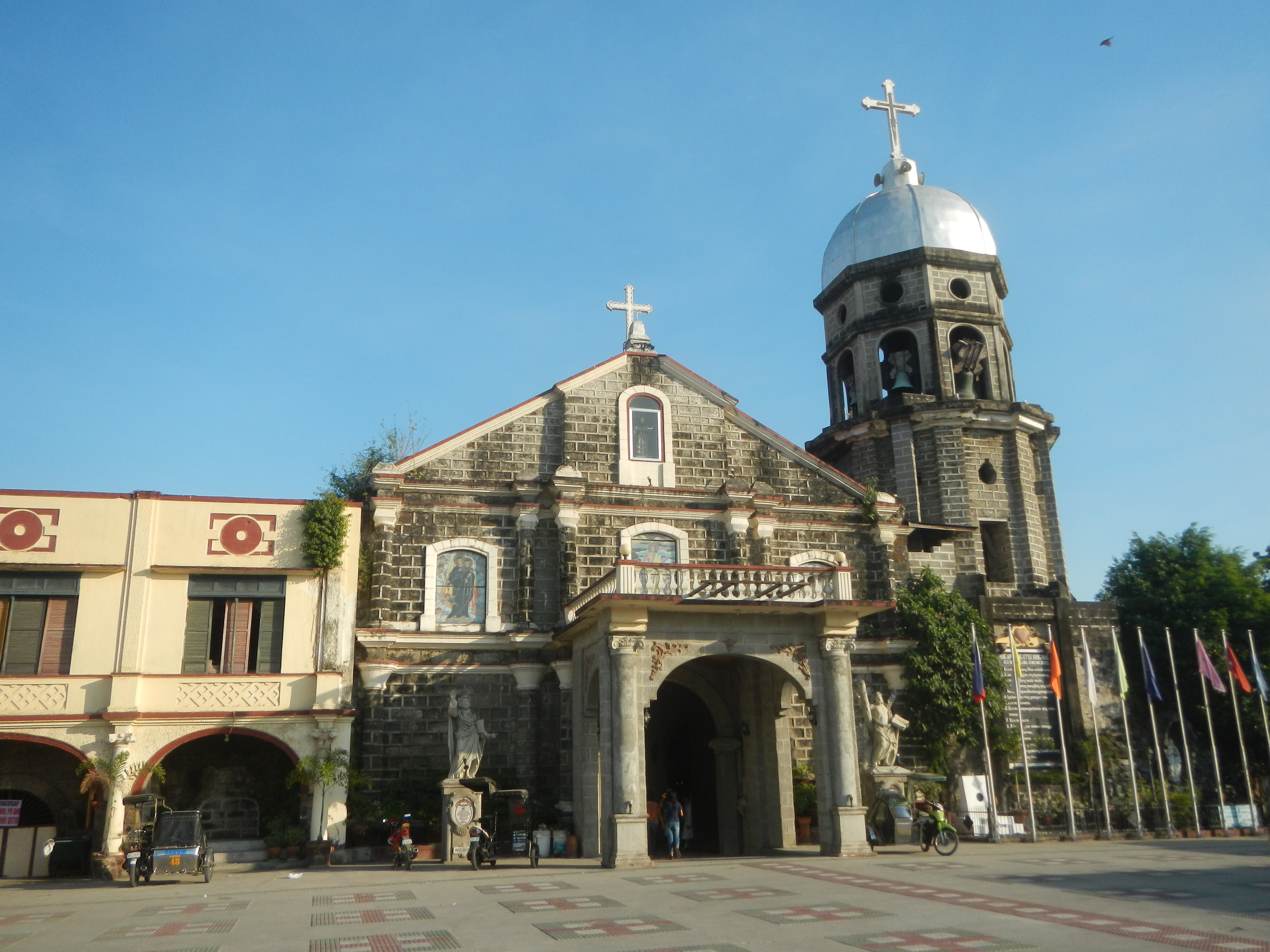
- Church facade in 2017

- Location in Luzon Location in the Philippines
- 15°05′31″N 120°49′40″E
- Location: Rizal St., Pescadores, Candaba, Pampanga
- Country: Philippines
- Denomination: Roman Catholic

History
- Founded: 1575

Architecture
- Functional status: Active
- Architect: Fr. Jose dela Cruz
- Architectural type: Church building
- Style: Baroque, Barn-style Baroque
- Completed: 1669

Specifications
- Length: 60 metres (200 ft)
- Width: 13 metres (43 ft)
- Height: 13 metres (43 ft)
- Materials: Stone, Sand, Gravel, Cement, Steel and Bricks

Administration
- Province: Ecclesiastical Province of San Fernando
- Archdiocese: Roman Catholic Archdiocese of San Fernando

Clergy
- Archbishop: Most. Rev. Florentino G. Lavarias, D.D.
- Priest(s): Rev. Fr. Francis F. Dizon, V.G.

San Andres Apostol Parish Church, commonly known as Candaba Church, is a 17th-century, Baroque church located at Barangay Pescadores, Candaba, Pampanga, Philippines. The parish church, dedicated to Saint Andrew the Apostle, is under the Roman Catholic Archdiocese of San Fernando.

== History ==
The convent of Candaba was established on May 3, 1575, and was annexed to the convent of Calumpit with Father Francisco de Ortega as priest. Candaba became the missionary center of the Augustinian Friars in preaching the Catholic faith to the rancherias of Arayat and Santa Ana with the permission Bishop Domingo de Salazar of Manila. Its convent once housed the school Estudio de Gramatica before a decision was made to transfer it to the convent of Lubao. The convent also became the refuge of philosophy students from the San Agustin Monastery in Manila during the British Occupation of 1762.

It is believed that by 1591, Candaba already had parochial structures built of light materials. Father Jose dela Cruz, described as a dynamic church builder, is believed to have commissioned the construction of a stone church from 1665 to 1669. Records do not tell of any significant damage to the stone church, leading to the conclusion that much of the structure has survived up until present times. Some accounts also show that a certain Father Felipe Guevara built a grímpola and a belfry as early as 1875. Father Esteban Ibeas in the year 1878 made several renovations to the church including the massive dome. Father Antonio Bravo erected the tower in 1881, with four Hilario Sunico bells installed from 1881 to 1890. The convent was enlarged by Father Vicente Ferrer in 1854 and was consequently renovated by Father Ibeas in 1878 and Father Isidro Bernardo in 1892.

== Architecture ==
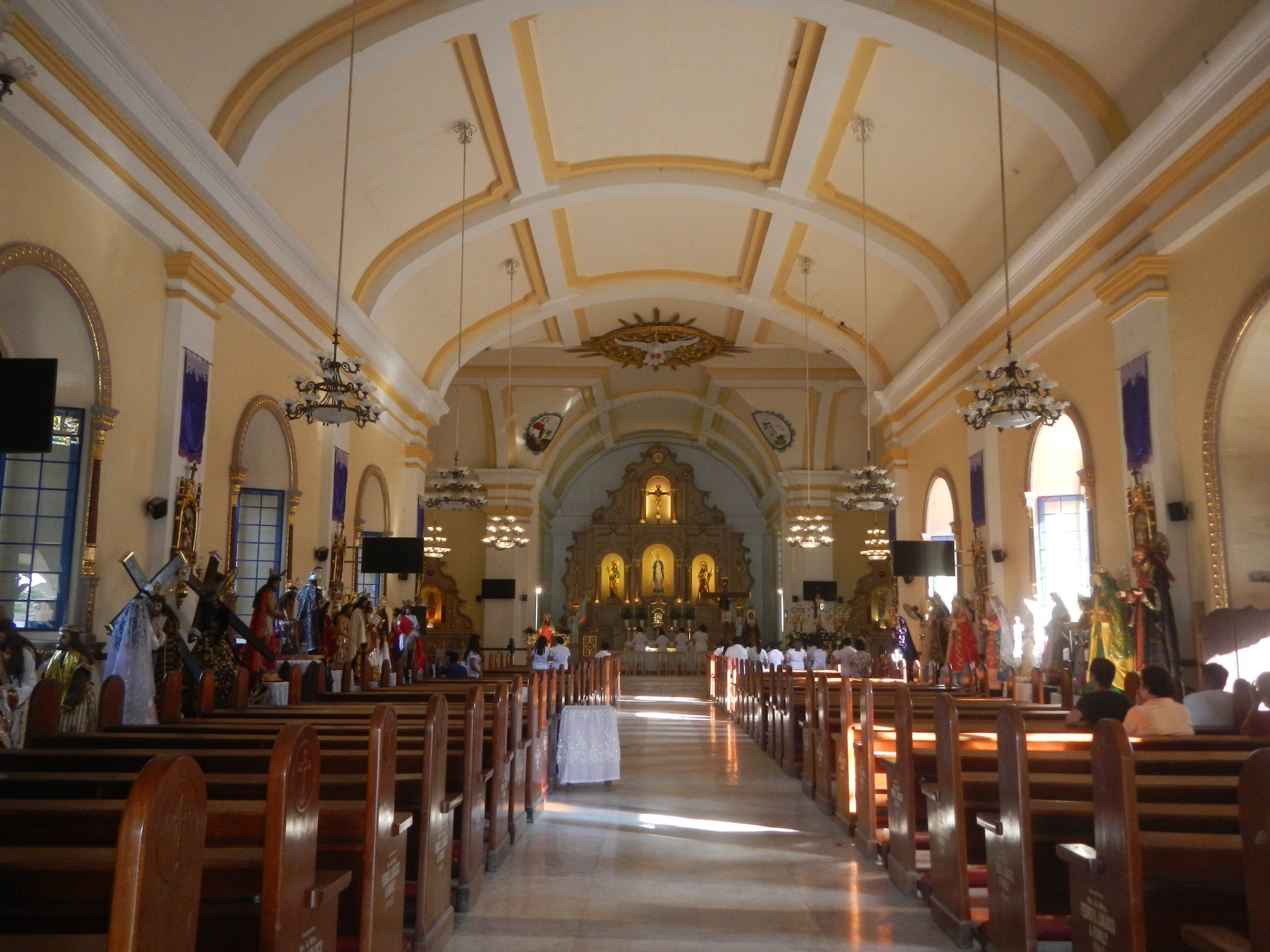
Church interior in 2017

The church measures 60 metres (200 ft) long, 13 metres (43 ft) wide and 13 metres (43 ft) high. The facade and bell tower is dominated by series of vertical lines and recesses. Devoid of other detailed ornamentation, only the column capitals, finial caps, cornices and a saint's niche located at the center of the protruding pediment break the simplicity of the façade's layout. A concrete porte-cochere mars the view of the entire front. To the left of the church rises the three-storey bell tower topped by a silver cross. To the opposite direction is the arcaded convent with predominant semicircular arches on the first level and geometric patterns of the second level. It is reminiscent of the Art Deco style. The massive dome attributed to Father Ibeas no longer exists.

== Gallery ==
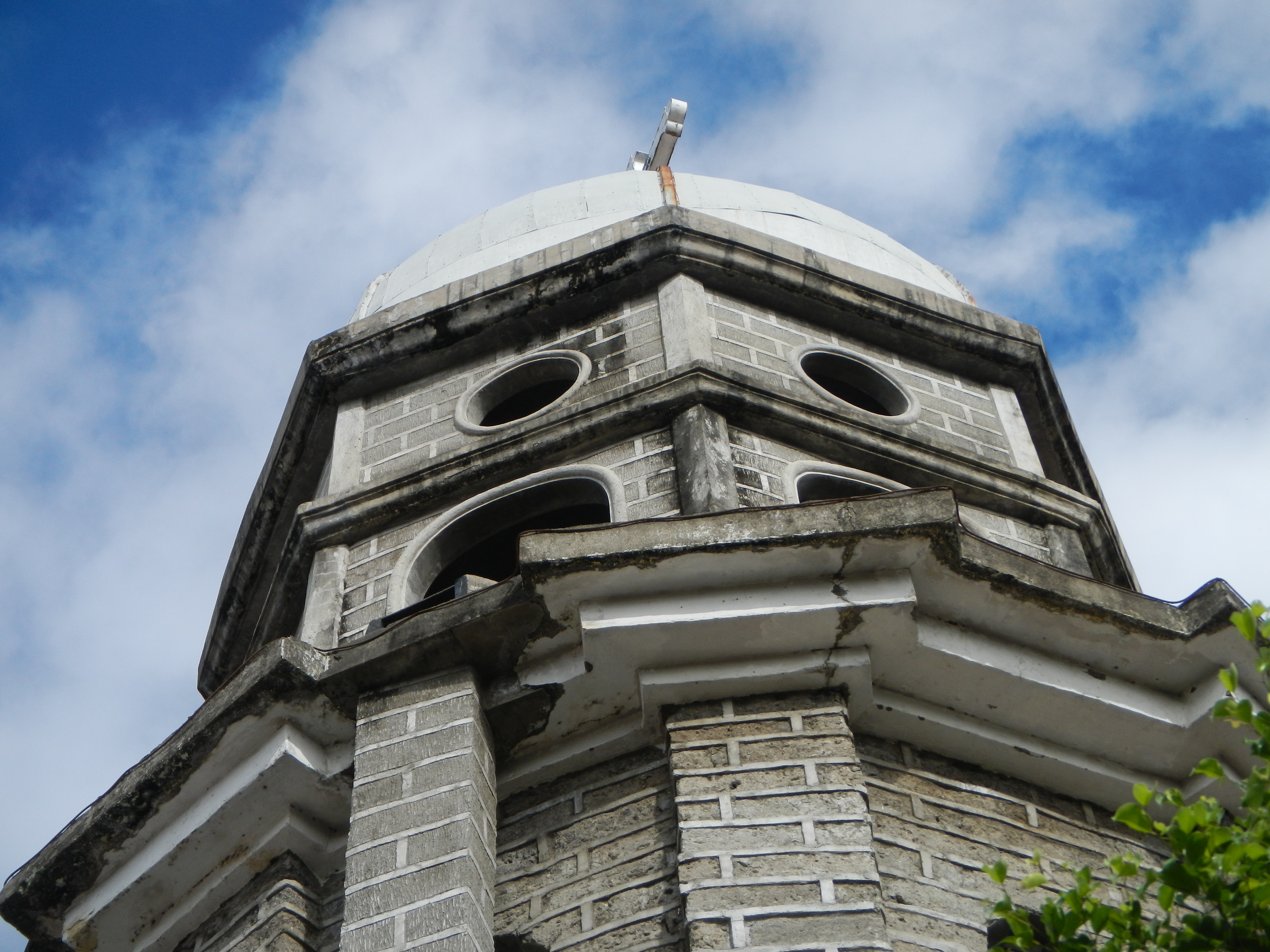
Detail of bell tower

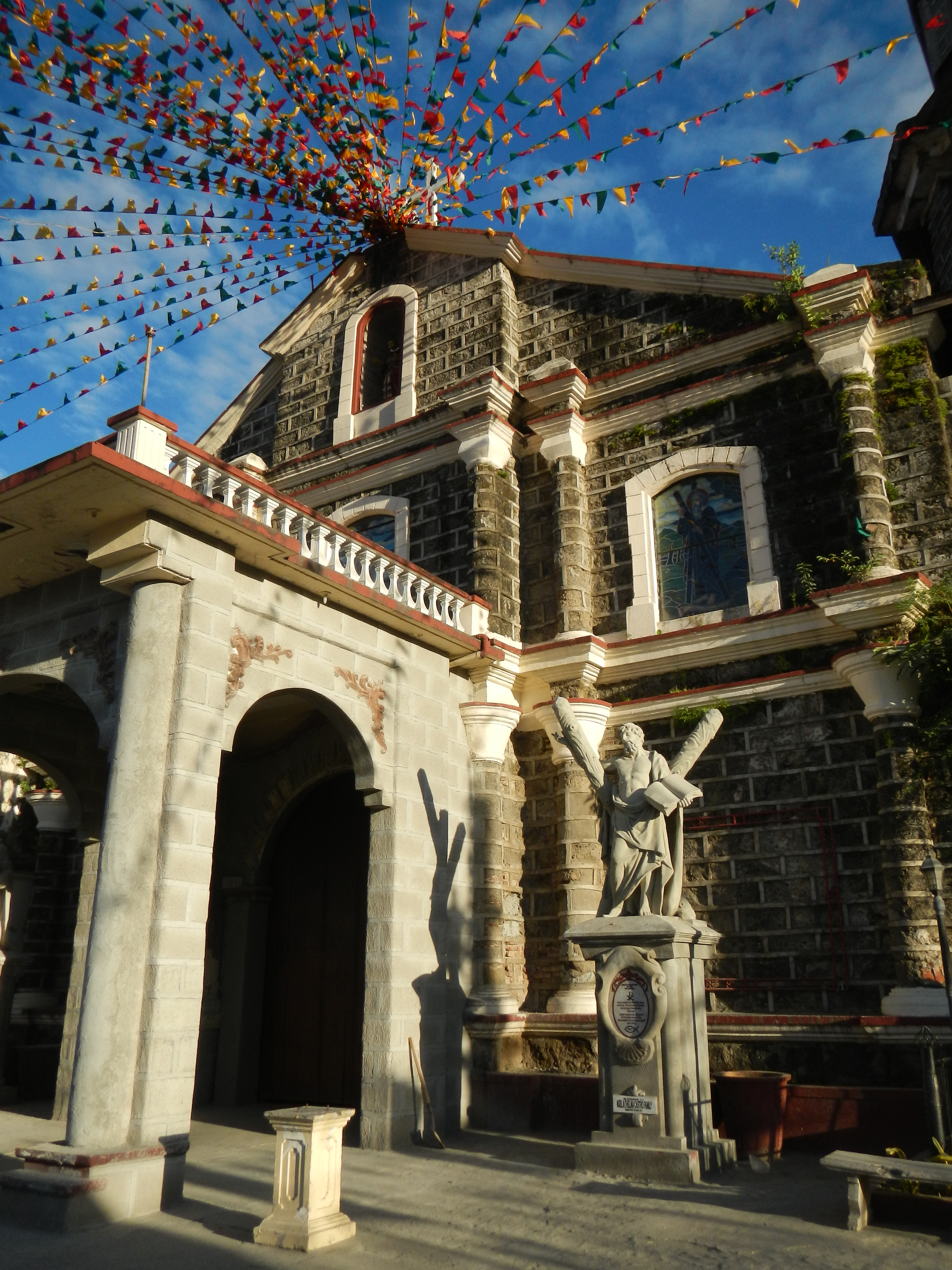
Close-up view of façade

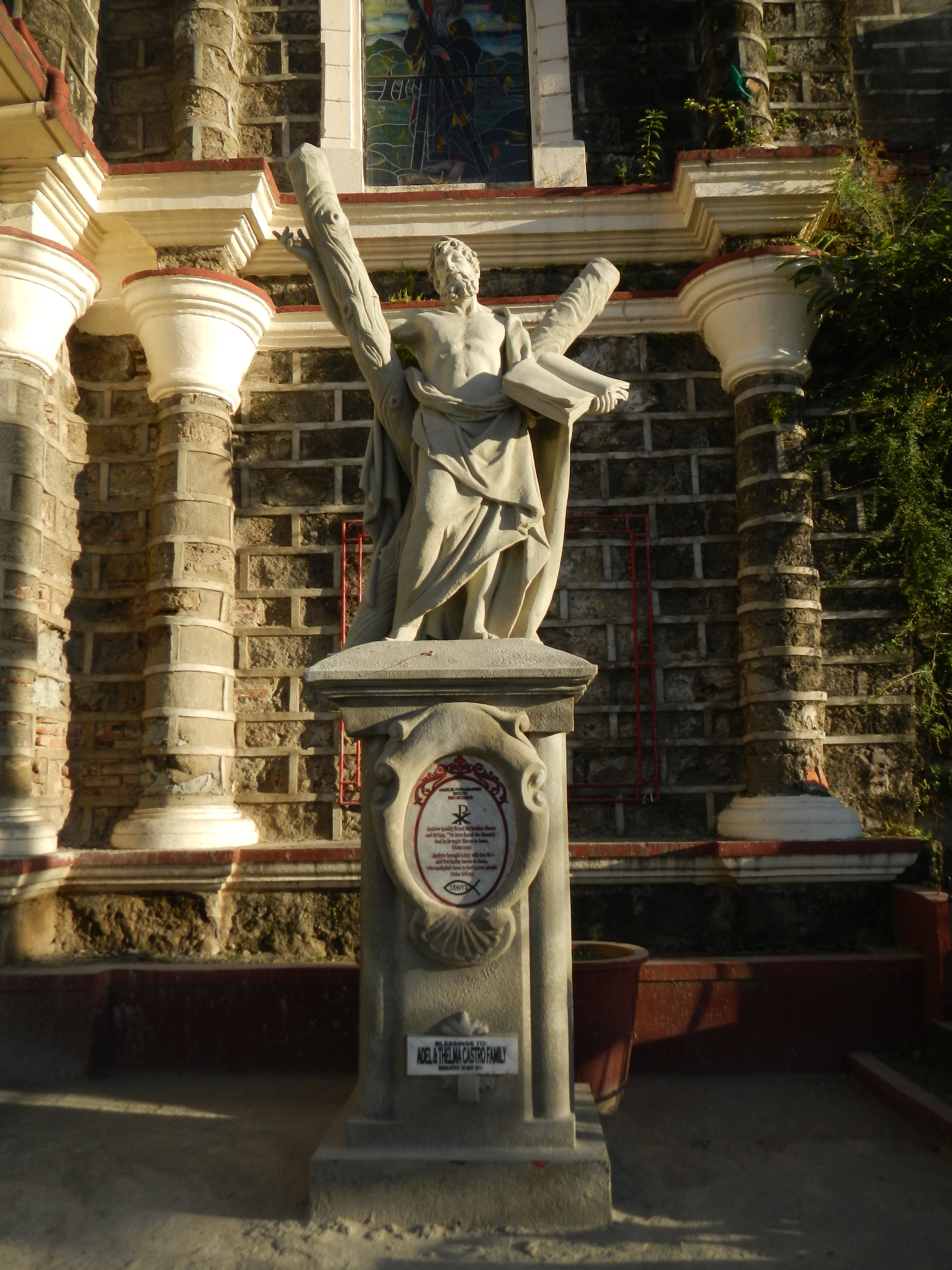
Statue of patron saint

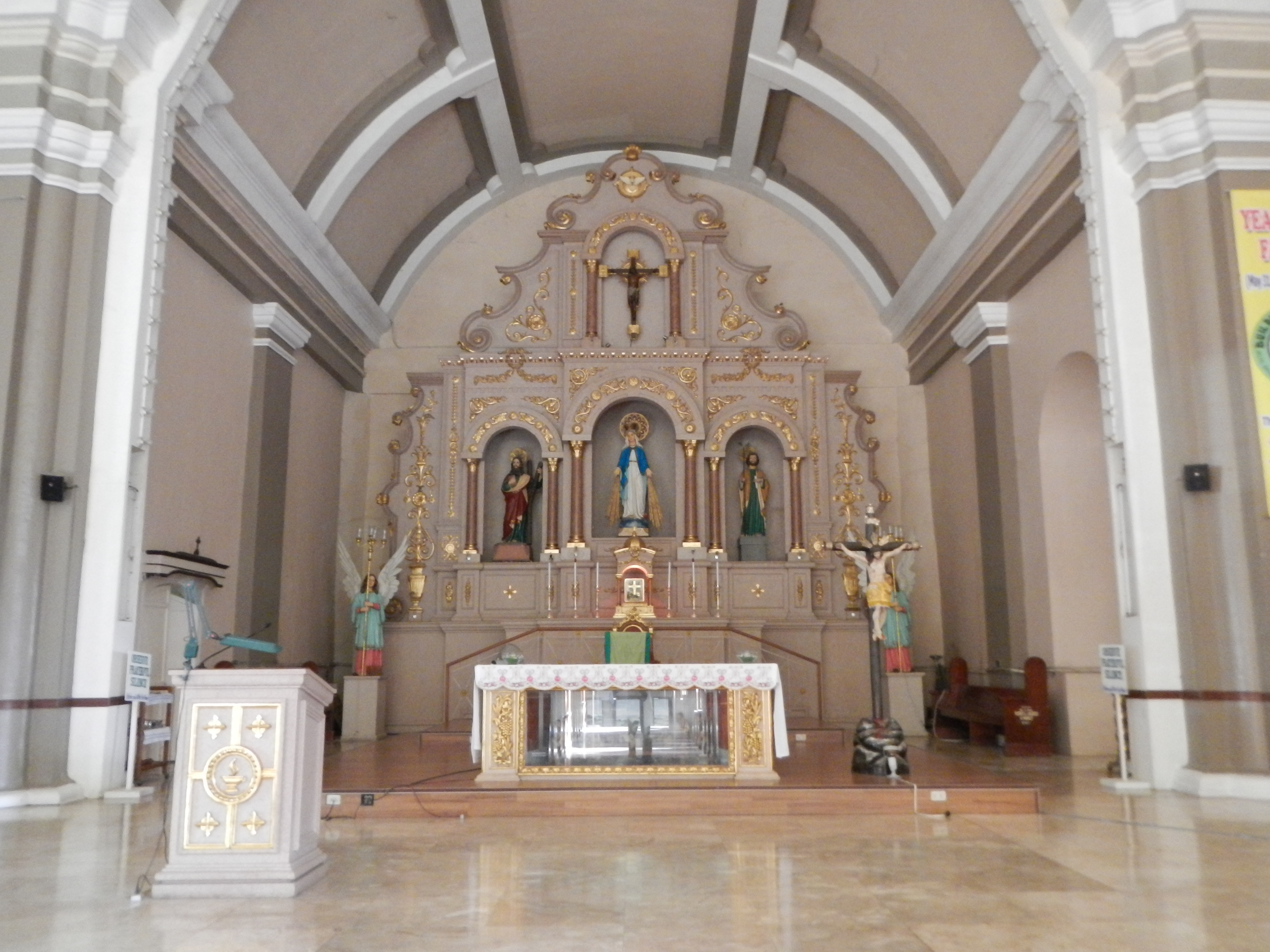
Main altarpiece

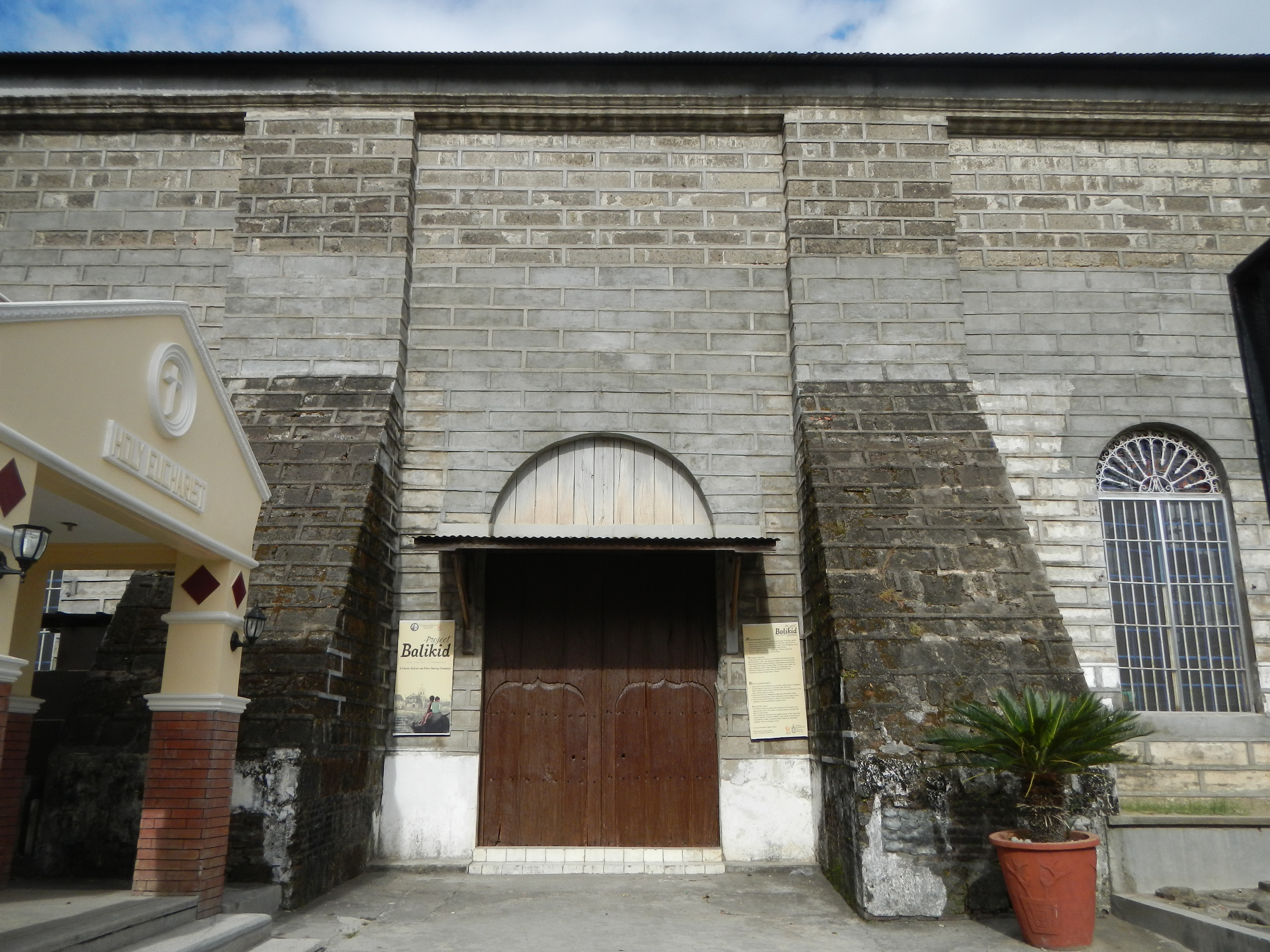
Side portal and buttresses

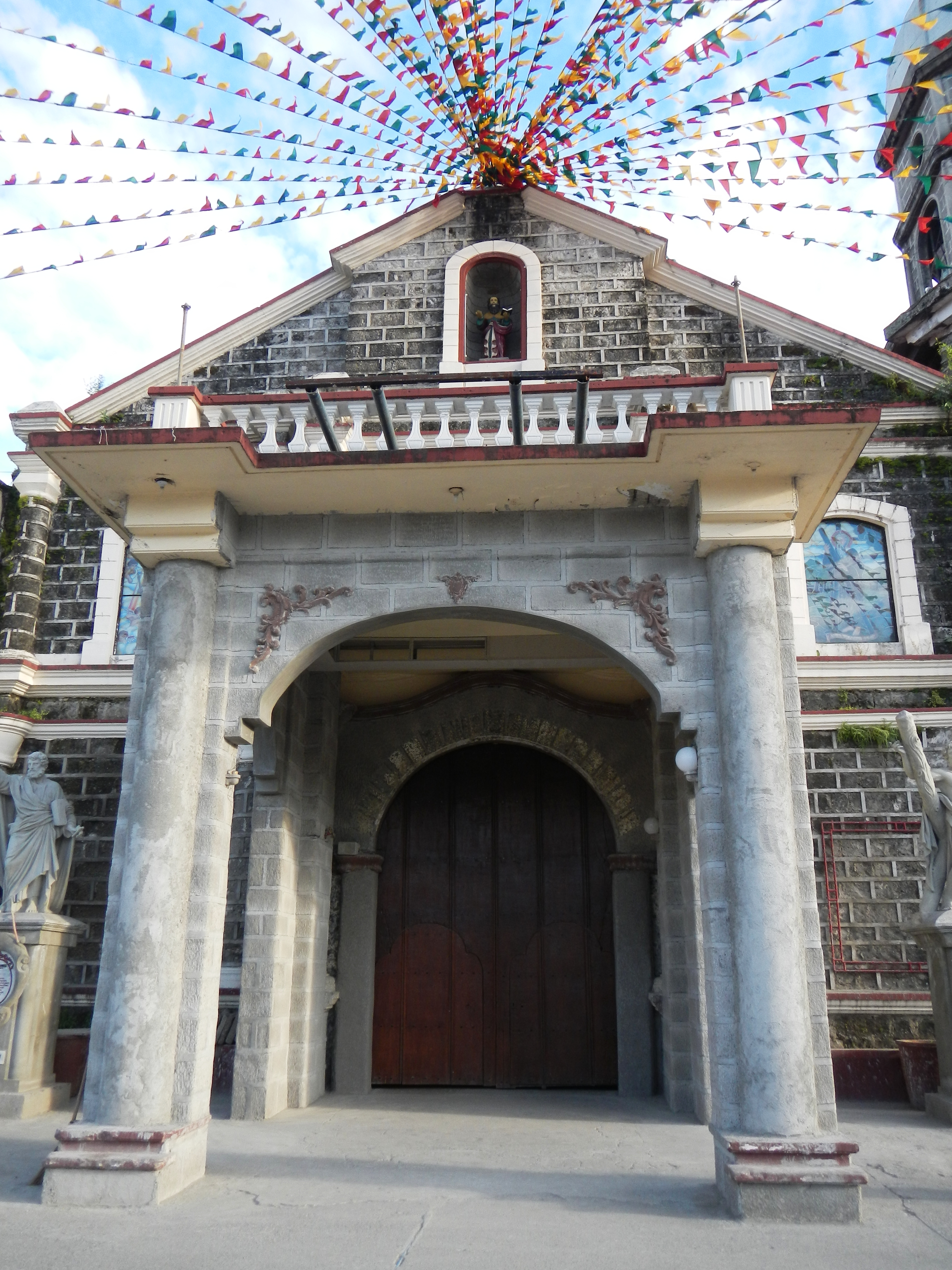
porte-cochere

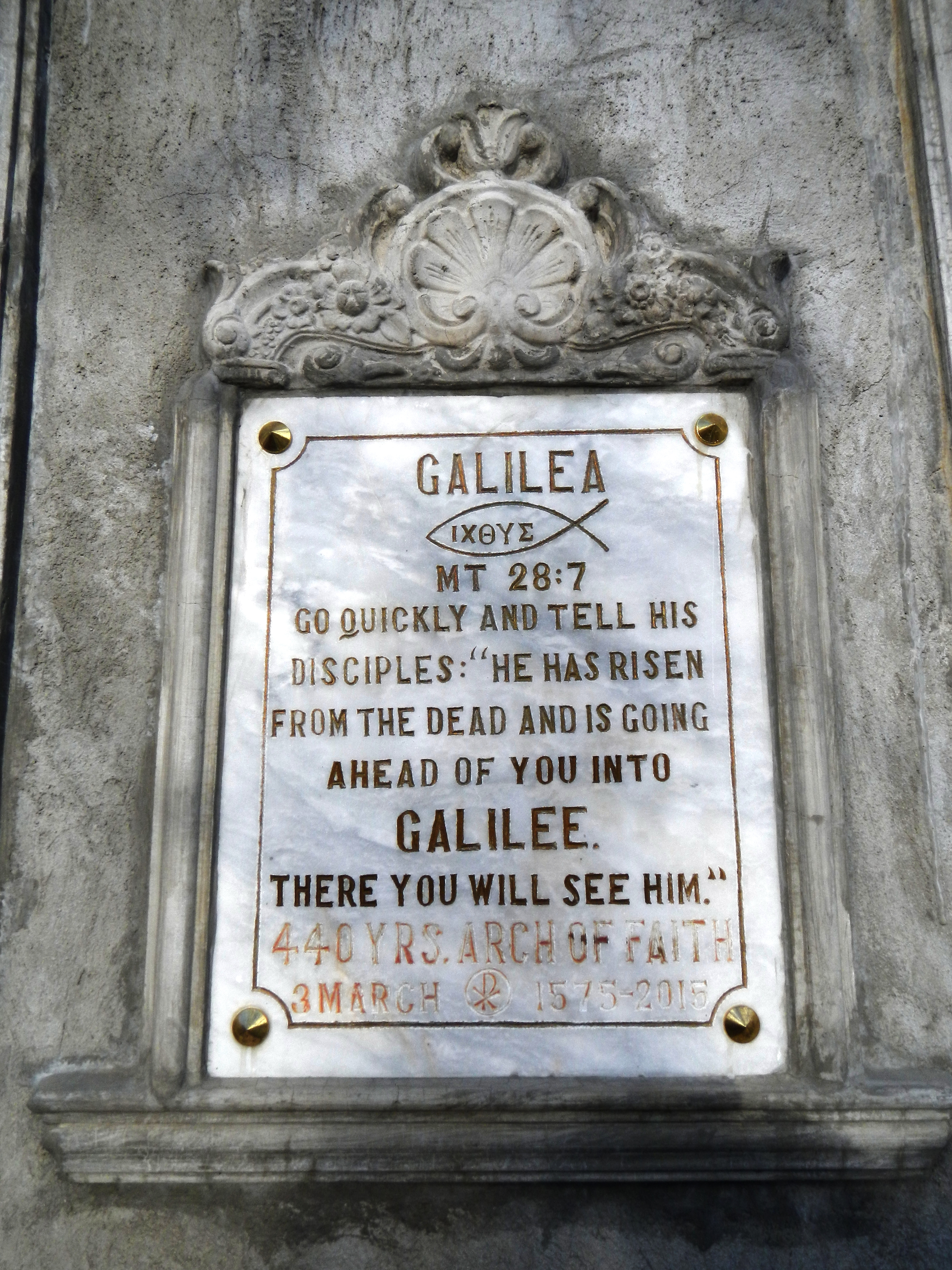
Marker

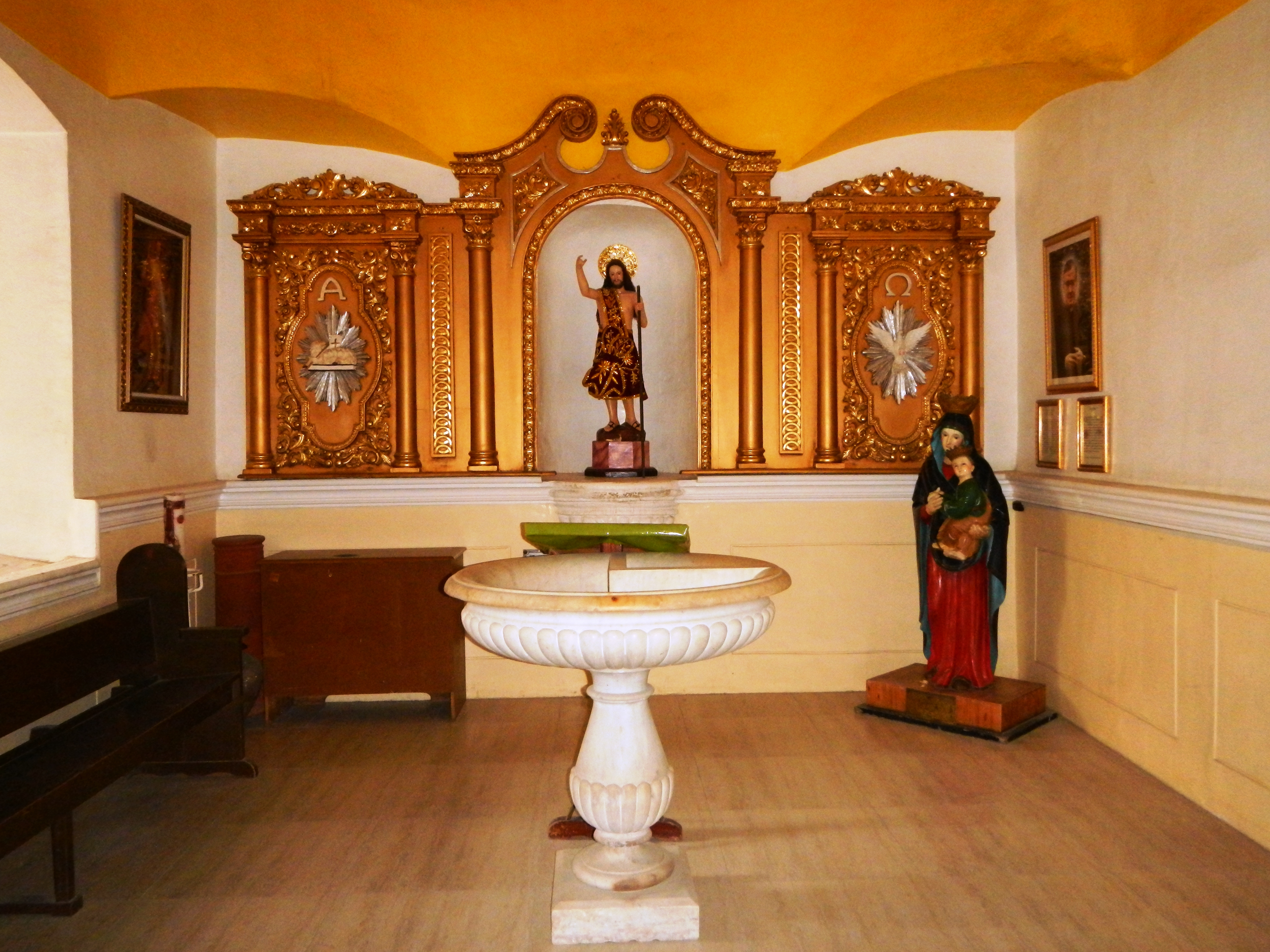
Baptistery

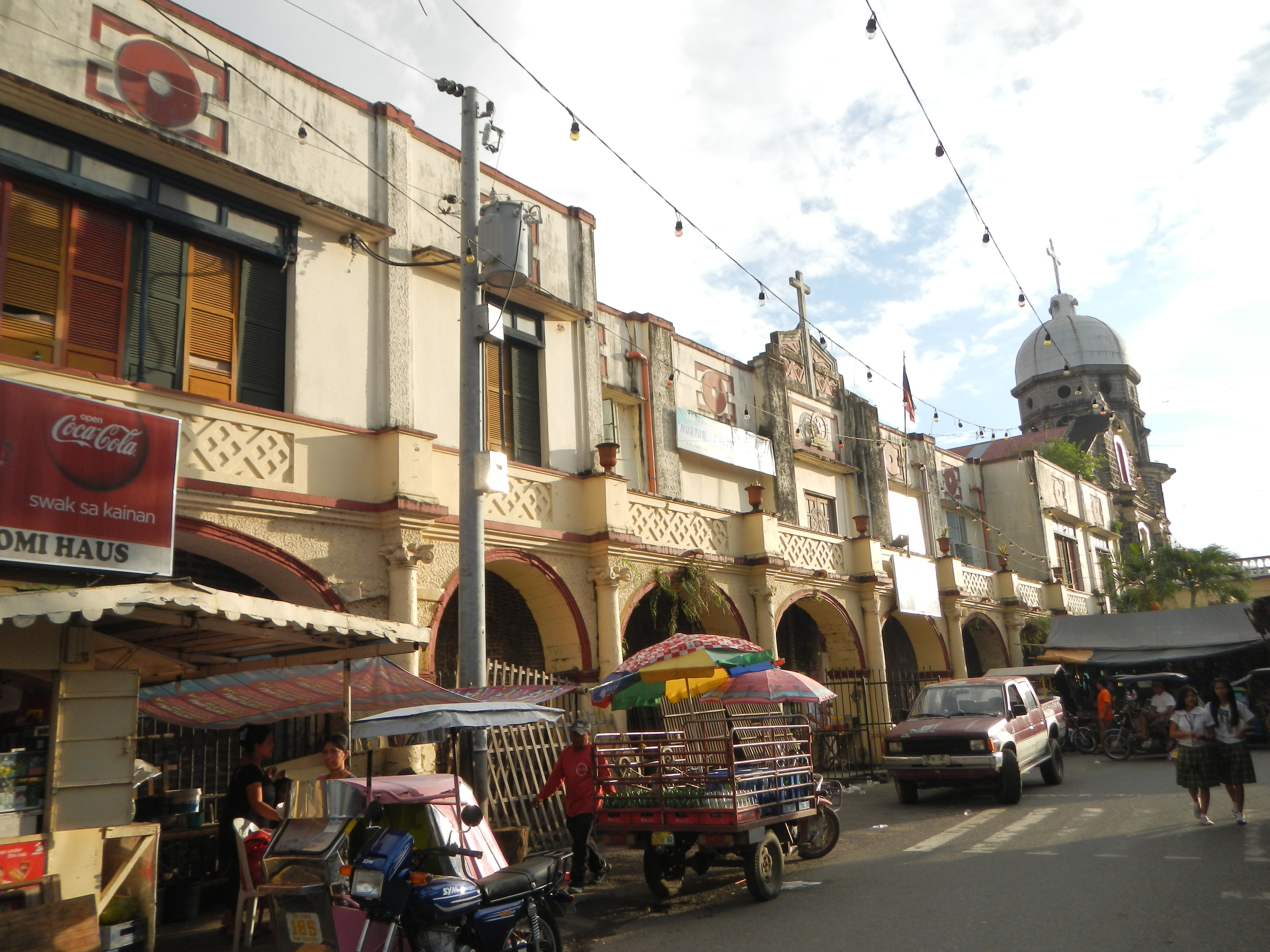
Convent turned into a school

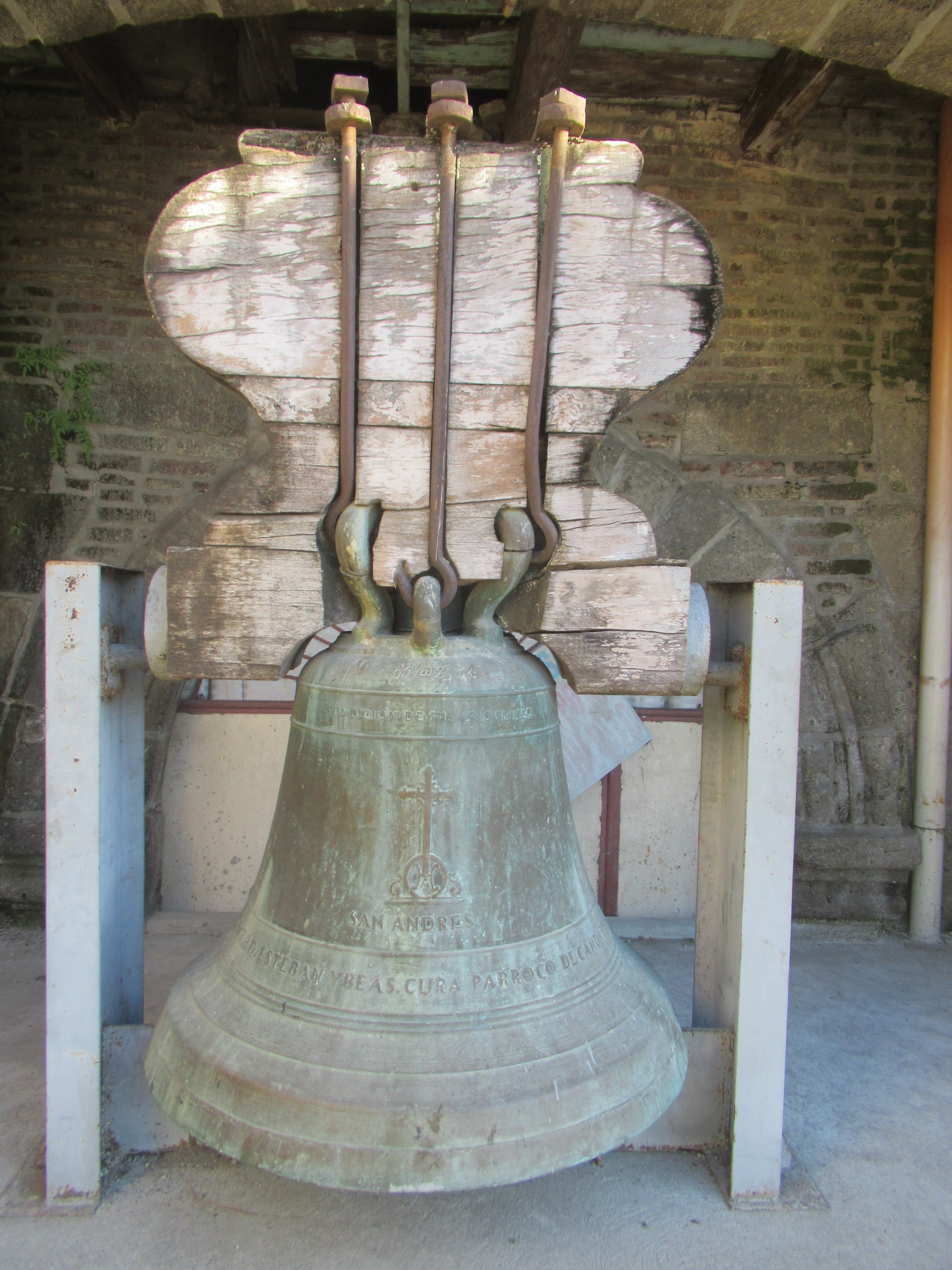
1879 church bells

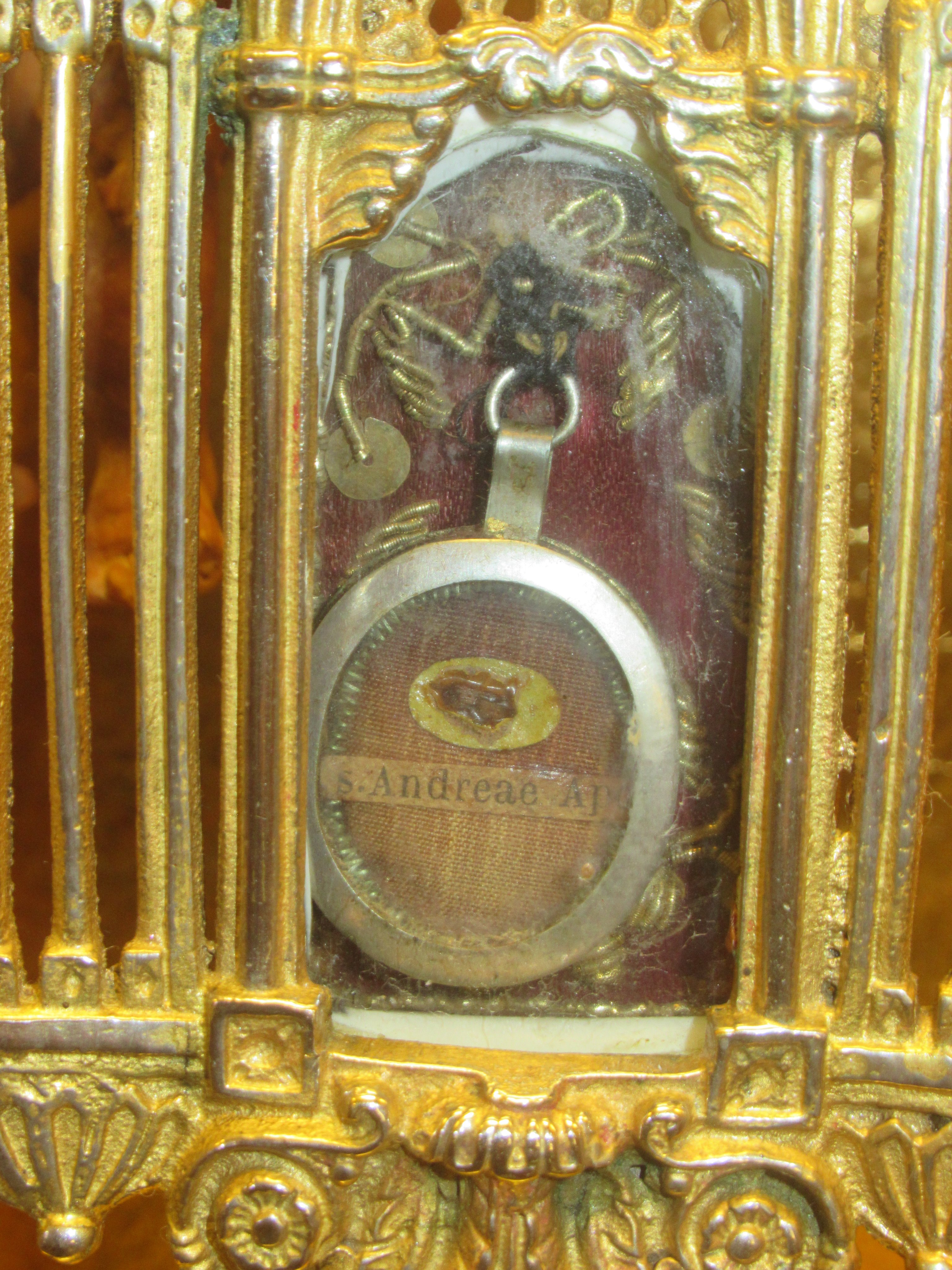
Andrew the Apostle's first class reliquary

== See also ==
- Nuestra Señora de la Merced Parish
