= Candaba =

Municipality in Pampanga, Philippines

- Municipality
- Municipality of Candaba
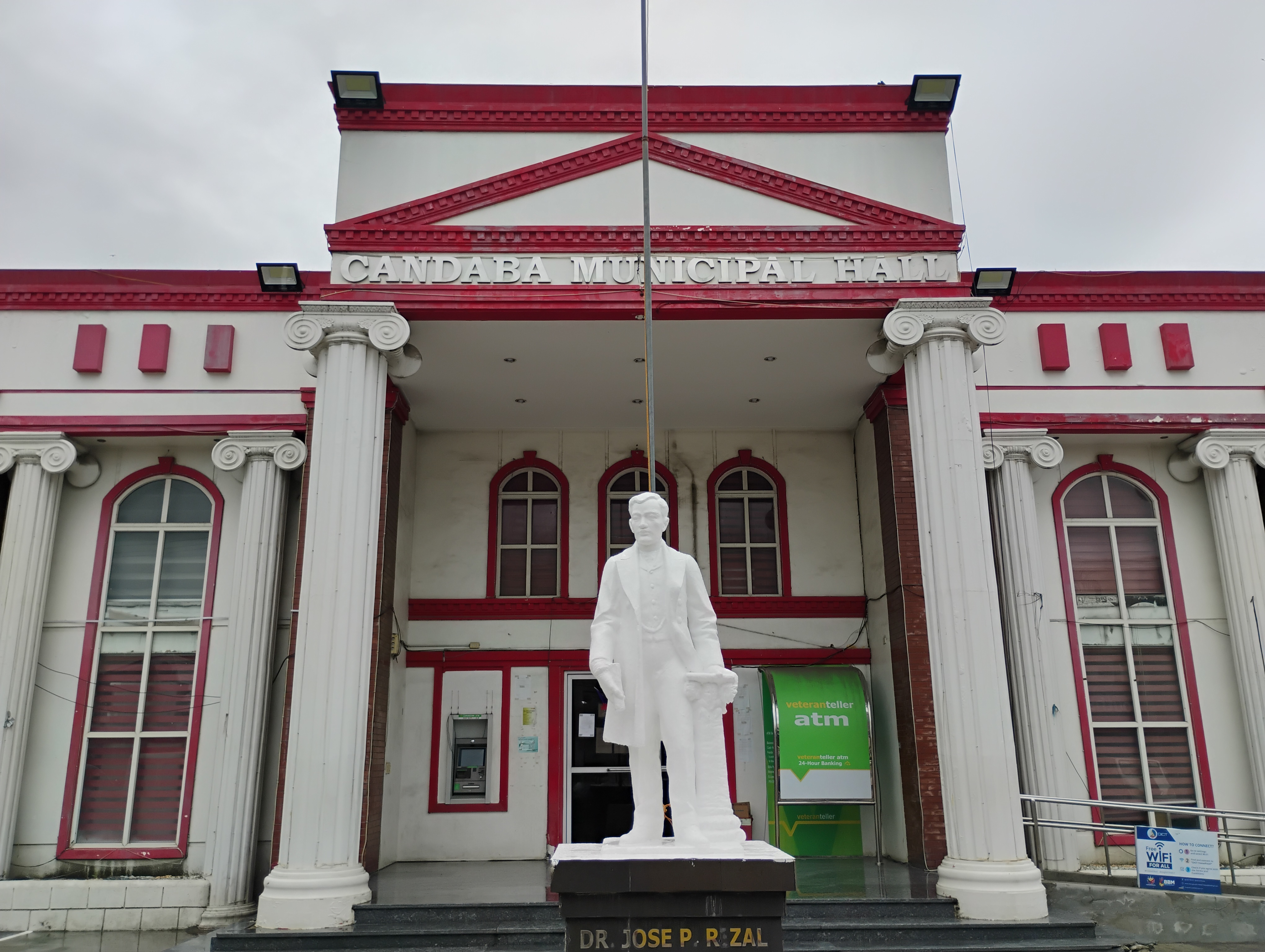
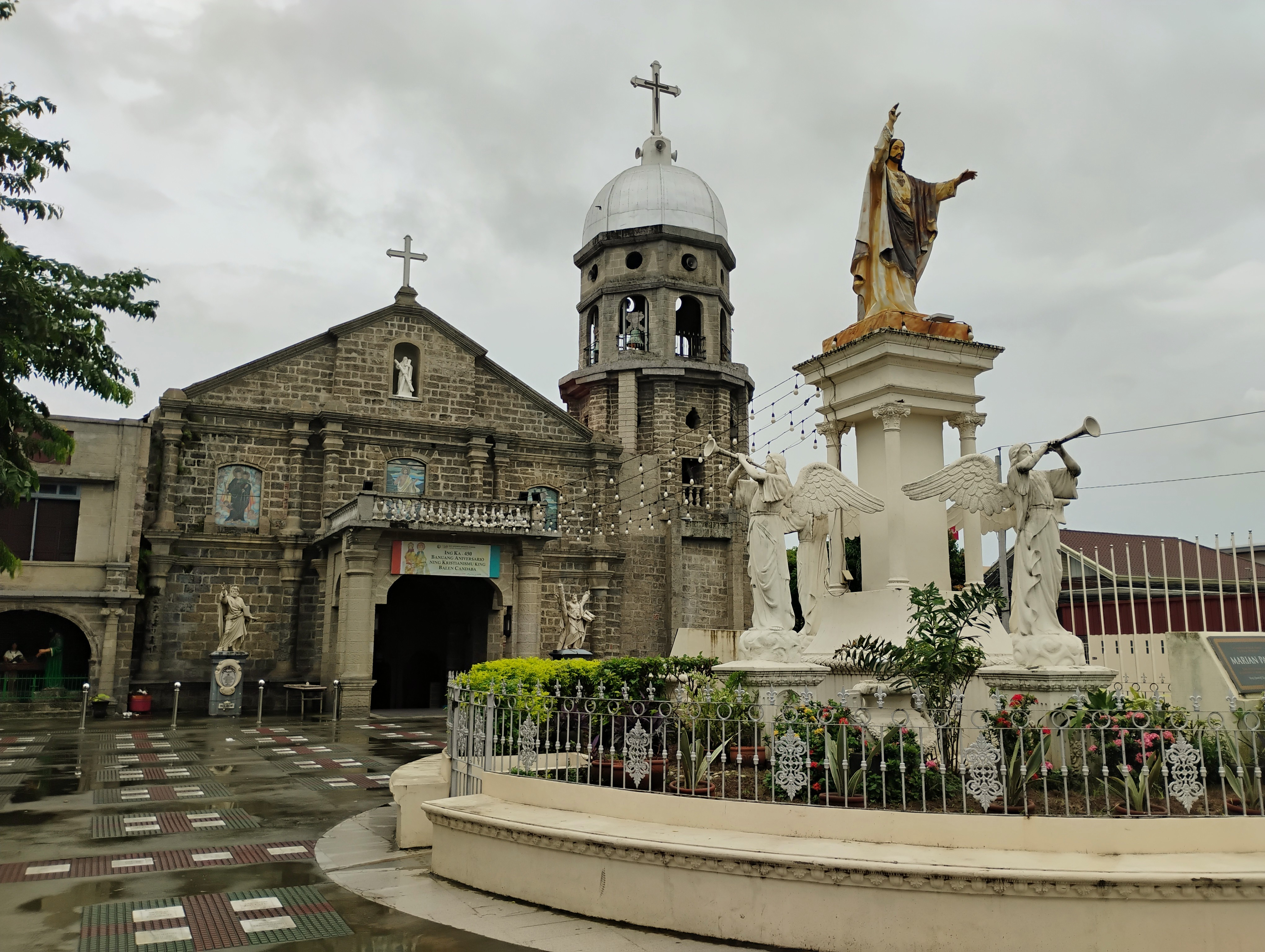
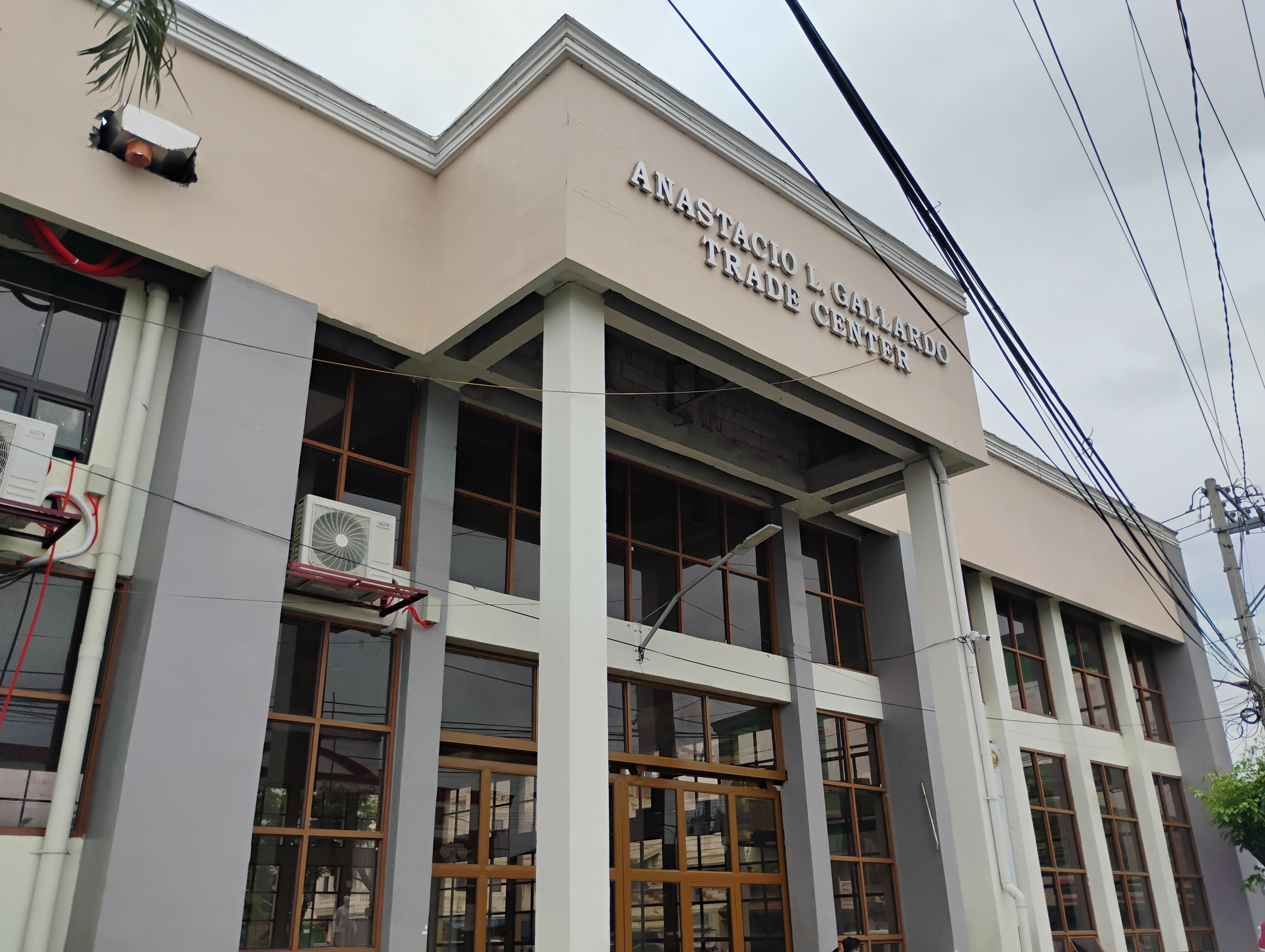
- Candaba Municipal Hall Saint Andrew Parish Church Anastacio L. Gallardo Trade Center

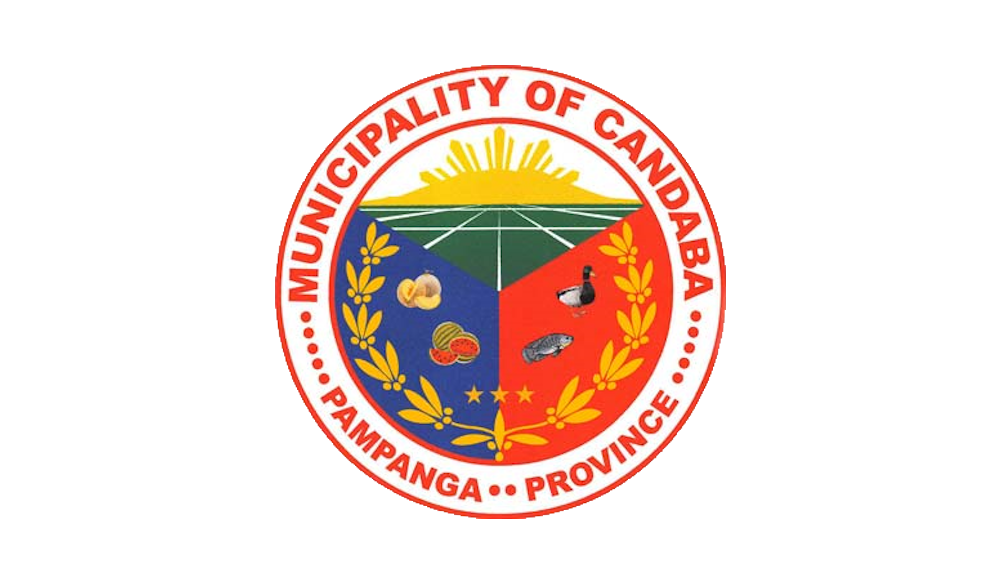
- Flag

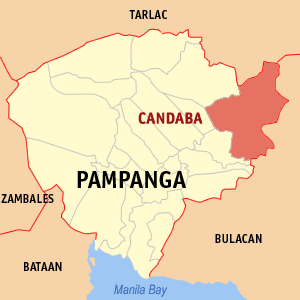
- Map of Pampanga with Candaba highlighted
- Interactive map of Candaba
- Location within the Philippines
- Coordinates: 15°05′36″N 120°49′42″E
- Country: Philippines
- Region: Central Luzon
- Province: Pampanga
- District: 4th district
- Barangays: 33 (see Barangays)

Government
  - Type: Sangguniang Bayan
  - Mayor: Rene E. Maglanque (Suspended)
  - Vice Mayor: Thelma C. Macapagal
  - Representative: Anna York P. Bondoc
  - Municipal Council: Members: Donato K. Bondoc III; Joy Marie M. Sagum; Quenie A. Culala; Camille d.C. Bulaon; Elmer G. Gonzales; Lycca N. Basa; Abino M. Carpio; Erlinda P. Salac
  - Electorate: 81,766 voters (2025)

Area
  - Total: 176.40 km^{2} (68.11 sq mi)
- Elevation: 28 m (92 ft)
- Highest elevation: 1,024 m (3,360 ft)
- Lowest elevation: 2 m (6.6 ft)

Population (2024 census)
  - Total: 124,019
  - Density: 703.06/km^{2} (1,820.9/sq mi)
  - Households: 27,052

Economy
  - Income class: 1st municipal income class
  - Poverty incidence: 10.92% (2023)
  - Revenue: ₱ 395.3 million (2024)
  - Assets: ₱ 524 million (2024)
  - Expenditure: ₱ 355.5 million (2024)
  - Liabilities: ₱ 124.1 million (2024)

Service provider
  - Electricity: Manila Electric Company (Meralco)
- Time zone: UTC+8 (PST)
- ZIP code: 2013
- PSGC: 0305405000
- IDD : area code: +63 (0)45
- Native languages: Kapampangan; Tagalog
- Website: www.candaba.gov.ph

Candaba, officially the Municipality of Candaba (Kapampangan: Balen ning Candaba; Tagalog: Bayan ng Candaba; formerly Candawe), is a municipality in the province of Pampanga, Philippines. According to the 2024 census, it has a population of 124,019 people.

== History ==
It is said that during the late pre colonial times, Candaba was once called "Candawa", and in Candaba sits one of the oldest recorded barrios in the province, Mandasig. Regional historians note that according to the genealogical testament, this settlement was specifically founded and populated by Dayang Mandik alongside her husband and first cousin, Malangsik. The name Mandasig itself is traditionally believed to be an etymological contraction or evolution of "Mandik" and "Malangsik."

In mid-1966, during a meeting at Camp Olivas with President Ferdinand Marcos, Mayor Anastacio L. Gallardo volunteered to become president of the Anti-Huk Mayor's League of Pampanga, which aimed to combat communist rebels from the Hukbalahap, with him stating, "Mr. President, I am willing to lead the anti-Huk movement. Give us guns and we will fight them. We can solve the problem here even if my colleagues here are playing footsie with the Huks." On July 18, 1966, Mayor Gallardo was on his way to another meeting with President Marcos when he and his five escorts were assassinated by Hukbalahap rebels in Barrio Santa Lucia, Santa Ana, Pampanga.

== Geography ==
Paddy field landscape at Brgy. Pulong Gubat

Candaba is located at the lowest point in the Central Luzon Region. The neighboring municipality of San Miguel (San Miguel de Mayumo) in Bulacan province used to be part of Candaba until San Miguel became a municipality itself (included is the area of Doña Remedios Trinidad bordering San Miguel and General Tinio).

Candaba is bounded by the following: Municipality of Arayat, Pampanga, and Municipality of Cabiao, Nueva Ecija, to the north; Municipality of San Miguel, Bulacan, and Municipality of San Ildefonso, Bulacan, to the east; Municipality of Baliuag, Bulacan, to the south; Municipality of San Luis, Pampanga, and Municipality of Santa Ana, Pampanga, to the west.

Candaba is also divided to 3 regions, the Tagalog Region comprising the southern part of Candaba which was a boundary between it and Baliuag and San Ildefonso, next is the Poblacion Region to the west which boundaries with Sta Ana, and next is the Kapampangan Region to the east which boundaries San Miguel.

=== Barangays ===
Candaba is politically subdivided into 33 barangays, as shown below. Each barangay consists of puroks and some have sitios.

- Bahay Pare
- Bambang
- Barangca
- Barit
- Buas (Poblacion)
- Cuayang Bugtong
- Dalayap
- Dulong Ilog
- Gulap
- Lanang
- Lourdes
- Magumbali
- Mandasig
- Mandili
- Mangga
- Mapaniqui
- Paligui
- Pangclara
- Pansinao
- Paralaya (Poblacion)
- Pasig
- Pescadores (Poblacion)
- Pulong Gubat
- Pulong Palazan
- Salapungan
- San Agustin (Poblacion)
- Santo Rosario
- Tagulod
- Talang
- Tenejero
- Vizal San Pablo
- Vizal Santo Cristo
- Vizal Santo Niño

=== Climate ===
Climate data for Candaba, Pampanga
Month	Jan	Feb	Mar	Apr	May	Jun	Jul	Aug	Sep	Oct	Nov	Dec	Year
Mean daily maximum °C (°F)	28 (82)	29 (84)	31 (88)	33 (91)	32 (90)	31 (88)	30 (86)	29 (84)	29 (84)	30 (86)	30 (86)	28 (82)	30 (86)
Mean daily minimum °C (°F)	20 (68)	20 (68)	21 (70)	23 (73)	24 (75)	24 (75)	24 (75)	24 (75)	24 (75)	23 (73)	22 (72)	21 (70)	23 (72)
Average precipitation mm (inches)	6 (0.2)	4 (0.2)	6 (0.2)	17 (0.7)	82 (3.2)	122 (4.8)	151 (5.9)	123 (4.8)	124 (4.9)	99 (3.9)	37 (1.5)	21 (0.8)	792 (31.1)
Average rainy days	3.3	2.5	3.6	6.6	17.7	22.2	25.2	23.7	23.2	17.9	9.2	5.2	160.3
Source: Meteoblue (Use with caution: this is modeled/calculated data, not measured locally.)

Like rest of the area in Central Luzon, there are two seasons in the area, the wet season and dry season. The wet season occurs during the months of May to October, and the dry season the rest of the year.

== Demographics ==
Population census of Candaba

Year	Pop.	±% p.a.
1903	11,783	—
1918	14,434	+1.36%
1939	19,956	+1.55%
1948	16,036	−2.40%
1960	28,811	+5.00%
1970	41,512	+3.72%
1975	48,458	+3.15%
1980	52,945	+1.79%

Year	Pop.	±% p.a.
1990	68,145	+2.56%
1995	77,546	+2.45%
2000	86,066	+2.26%
2007	96,589	+1.60%
2010	102,399	+2.15%
2015	111,586	+1.65%
2020	119,497	+1.45%
2024	124,019	+0.90%

Source: Philippine Statistics Authority

In the 2024 census, the population of Candaba was 124,019 people, with a density of 700 inhabitants per square kilometre or 1,800 inhabitants per square mile.

=== Religion ===
Roman Catholic 55%, Members Church of God International 2.5%, Iglesia ni Cristo 5%, Evangelicals 35%, others (includes Islam, Buddhism and other religions) 1.5%. The San Andres Apostol Parish serves as one of the Roman Catholic parish churches inside the municipality. Founded way back 1575, this parish is the oldest parish of the town that houses the town's patron, San Andres Apostol otherwise known as Apung Dalis, who celebrates his feast day during the 30th of November, every year.

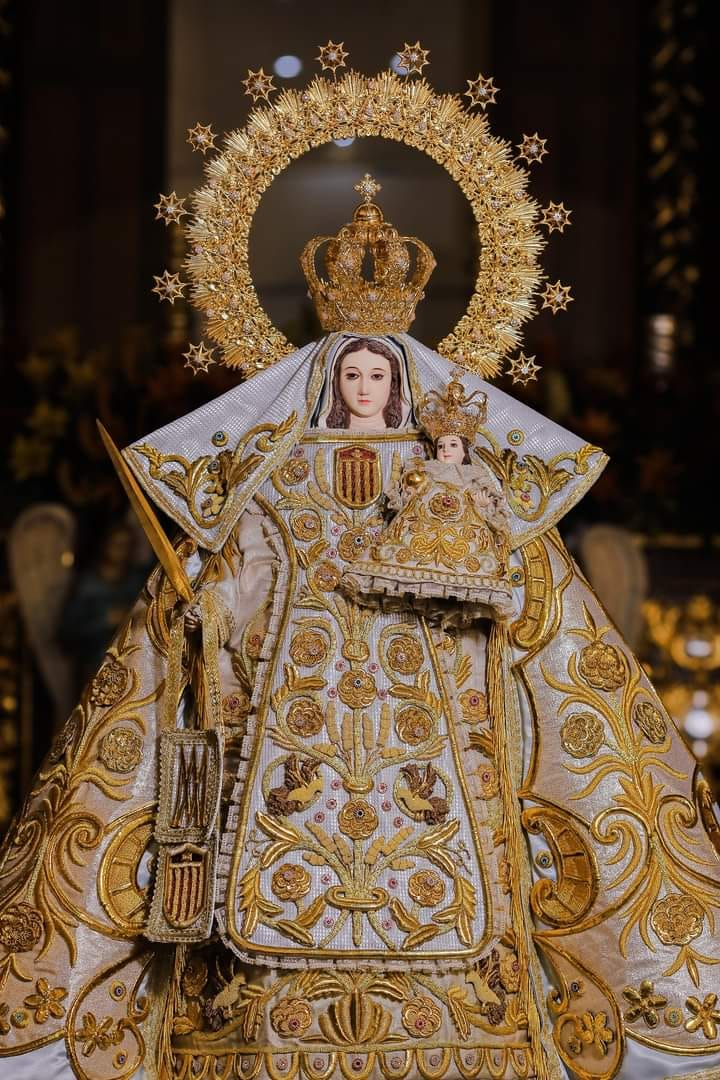
Nuestra Señora de la Merced de Pampanga

The second oldest parish is the Nuestra Señora de la Merced Parish (F-1937) in Bahay Pare, Candaba, Pampanga where the miraculous and oldest image of Our Lady of Mercy in the Philippines is enshrined. Devotees flock to the parish to ask Mary to intercede for their spiritual, mental, and physical health, for their families and studies, and for the increase of vocations to the priesthood and consecrated life. The image is well known for her Dalit as She visits different places. Her feast day is every September 24.

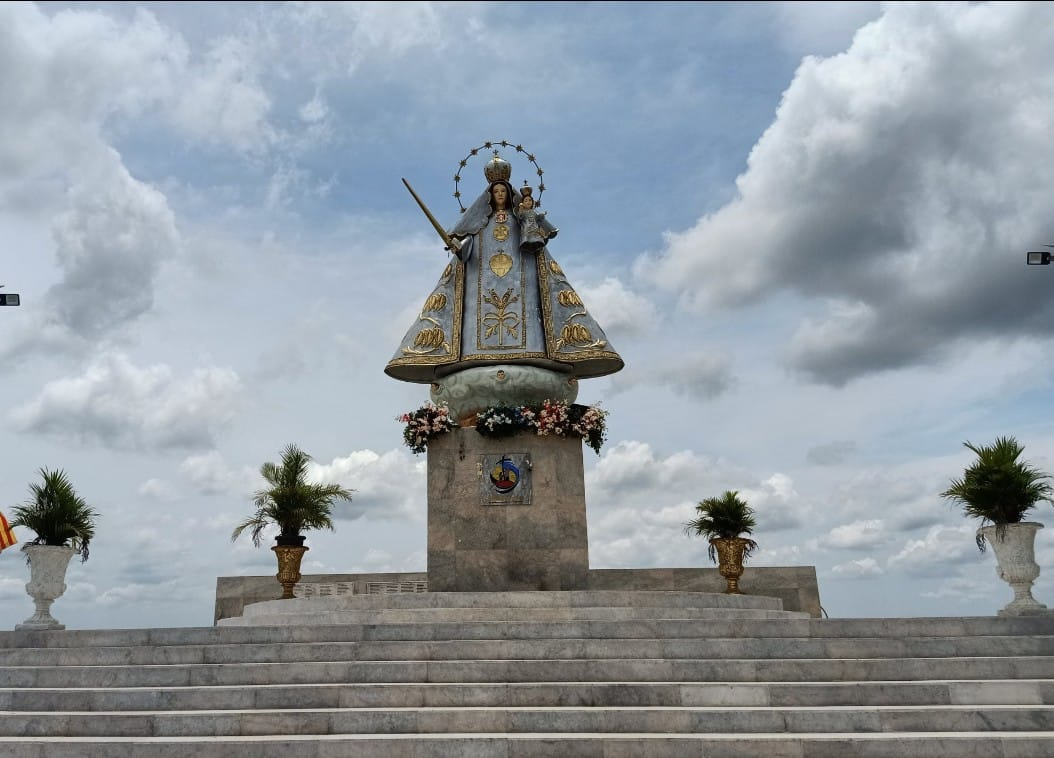
Nuestra sa Pinac

On August 22, 2021, "Nuestra sa Pinac" or "Nuestra Señora de la Merced sa Pinac", a statue of Our Lady of Mercy along the Candaba-Baliuag Road was blessed by the Most Rev. Florentino G. Lavarias, D.D, Archbishop of San Fernando with Most. Rev. Paciano Aniceto during the Memorial of the Queenship of Mary. It has become a local tourist spot.

The other parishes in the town are Virgen de Lourdes Parish (F-1983) in Talang, Señor Salvador Parish (F-1985) in Salapungan, and Lord's Baptism Parish (F-1996) in Pasig. The parishes are under the jurisdiction of the Roman Catholic Archdiocese of San Fernando, Pampanga.

One of the popular religious site in Candaba is in the barangay "Pulong Gubat". It pulls many pilgrims who believe that Nuestro Señor de la Paciencia will cure their illness or grant their wishes.

== Economy ==
Poverty incidence of Candaba (%)

Source: Philippine Statistics Authority

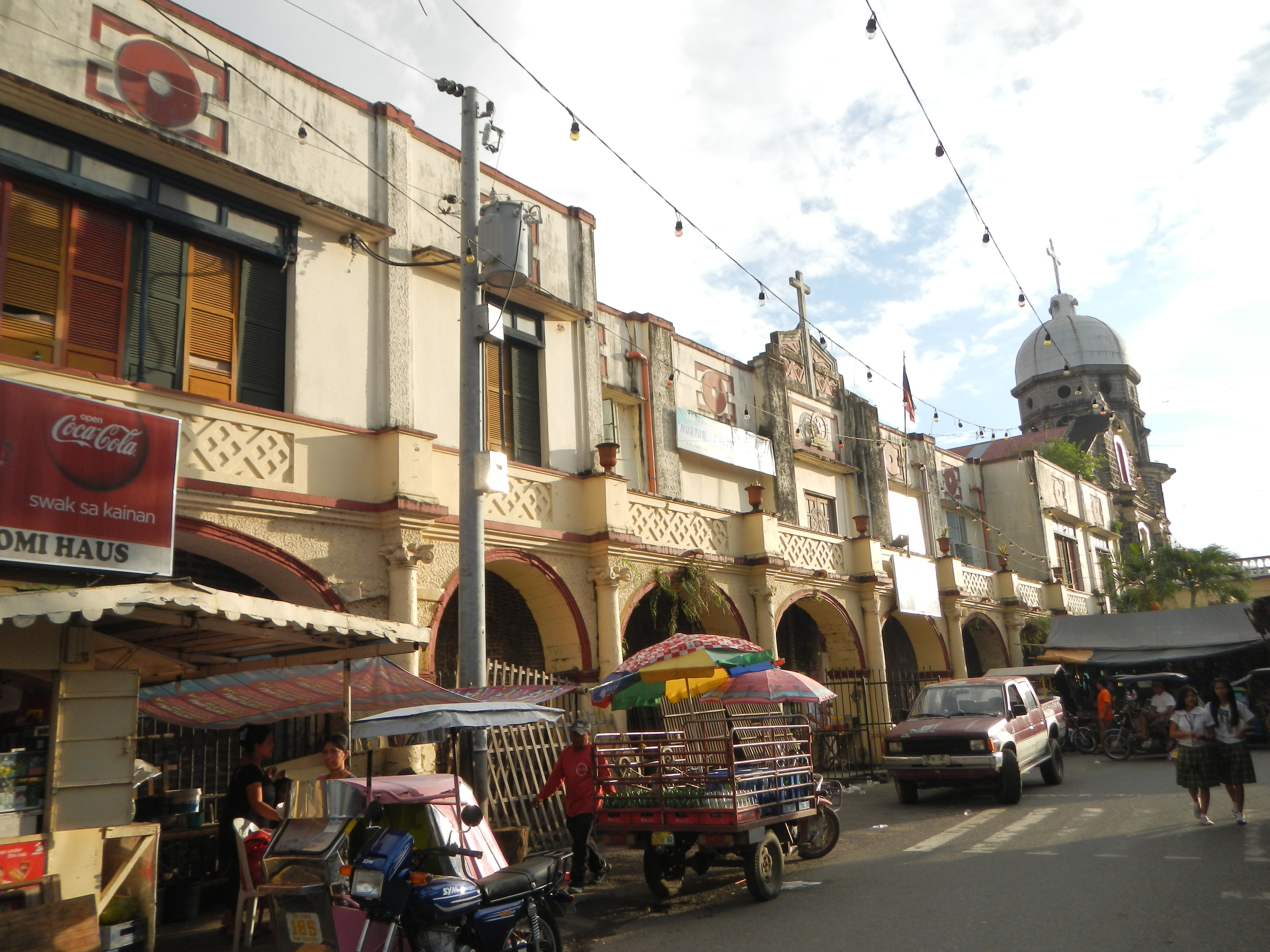
Candaba market

The Candaba Swamp (Pinac, Pinak) absorbs most of the flood waters that flow from the western slopes of the Sierra Madre Mountain Range. During the rainy season, the Pampanga River overflows and the swamp is submerged. But it is relatively dry during the dry Season, hence making the land suitable for a variety agricultural production.

Candaba is noted for its production of melons that are sold worldwide. The swamps are communal fishing grounds encompassing some 430 km^{2} of highly arable farmlands. Candaba swamps are very fertile due to its sustained deposits of humus and decaying plant residues. Migrant wild ducks and various wildlife bird from Siberia, New Zealand, Mongolia and other parts of Asia use Candaba as their yearly sanctuary.

== Infrastructure ==
Drainage System

The Candaba-San Miguel road is known for being flooded when a typhoon hits Candaba. The drainage system or rip-rap, which is a part of Mayor Jerry Pelayo's road cementing project, was built on both sides of every cemented roads made so the rainwater from other parts of Pampanga will just flow on it and not on the road.

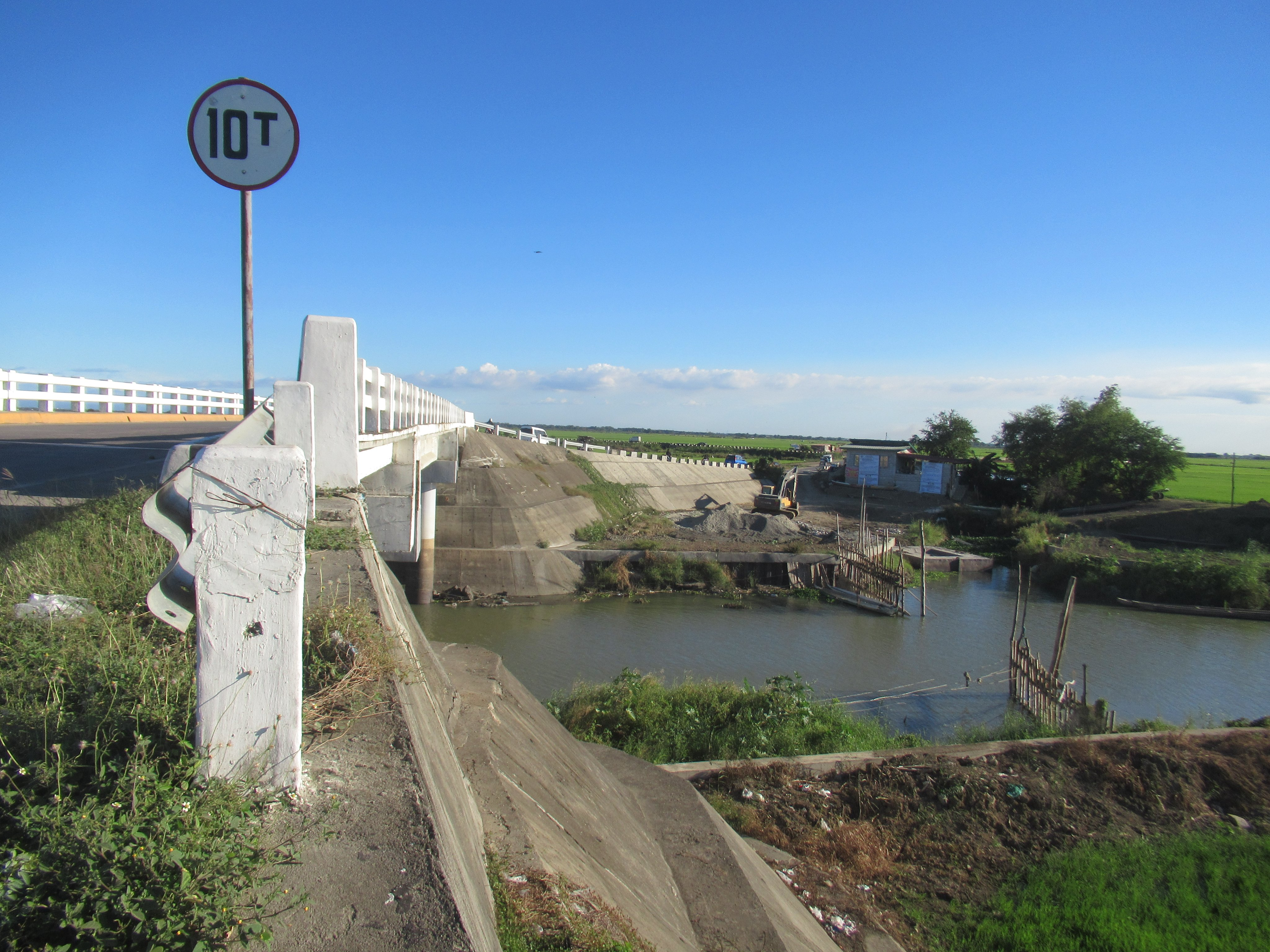
Malisik River-New San Agustin Bridge in 2024

=== Transportation ===
Public transport is mainly done by means of jeepneys and tricycles. Jeepneys have their routes as an itinerary route for various places. Candaba-San Miguel road or pinak was fully cemented by 2014.

=== Telecommunication facilities ===
Candaba's telecommunication facilities, telephone and internet services are provided by the Converge ICT Solutions, Globe Telecom, Philippine Long Distance Telephone Company (PLDT), Datelcom, Evangelista Telephone Company, and the Pampanga Telecom Company.

=== Water and power utilities ===
Waterworks

Candaba will soon have modern waterworks, following the start of a 24 million Peso water supply development project of the Candaba Water District (CWD) with the financial and technical assistance of the Local Water Utilities Administration (LWUA). Other means to get drinking water are water wells.

Electric power

The municipality receives it electric power in from the Pampanga 1 Electric Cooperative (PELCO 1) and from Manila Electric Company (Meralco).

PSGC	Barangay	Electric Utility	Acronym
35405001	Bahay Pare	Manila Electric Company	Meralco
35405002	Bambang	Pampanga 1 Electric Cooperative	PELCO 1
35405003	Barangca	Manila Electric Company	Meralco
35405004	Barit	Pampanga 1 Electric Cooperative	PELCO 1
35405005	Buas (Poblacion)	Pampanga 1 Electric Cooperative	PELCO 1
35405008	Cuayang Bugtong	Pampanga 1 Electric Cooperative/Manila Electric Company	PELCO 1/MERALCO
35405009	Dalayap	Pampanga 1 Electric Cooperative	PELCO 1
35405010	Dulong Ilog	Manila Electric Company	Meralco
35405011	Gulap	Pampanga 1 Electric Cooperative	PELCO 1
35405012	Lanang	Pampanga 1 Electric Cooperative	PELCO 1
35405013	Lourdes	Pampanga 1 Electric Cooperative/Manila Electric Company	PELCO 1/MERALCO
35405014	Magumbali	Manila Electric Company	Meralco
35405015	Mandasig	Pampanga 1 Electric Cooperative	PELCO 1
35405016	Mandili	Manila Electric Company	Meralco
35405017	Mangga	Pampanga 1 Electric Cooperative	PELCO 1
35405018	Mapaniqui	Manila Electric Company	Meralco
35405020	Paligui	Manila Electric Company	Meralco
35405021	Pangclara	Manila Electric Company	Meralco
35405022	Pansinao	Pampanga 1 Electric Cooperative	PELCO 1
35405023	Paralaya (Poblacion)	Pampanga 1 Electric Cooperative	PELCO 1
35405024	Pasig	Pampanga 1 Electric Cooperative	PELCO 1
35405025	Pescadores (Poblacion)	Pampanga 1 Electric Cooperative	PELCO 1
35405026	Pulong Gubat	Manila Electric Company	Meralco
35405027	Pulong Palazan	Manila Electric Company	Meralco
35405028	Salapungan	Manila Electric Company	Meralco
35405029	San Agustin (Poblacion)	Pampanga 1 Electric Cooperative	PELCO 1
35405031	Santo Rosario	Pampanga 1 Electric Cooperative	PELCO 1
35405032	Tagulod	Nueva Ecija 1 Electric Cooperative	NEECO 1
35405033	Talang	Pampanga 1 Electric Cooperative	PELCO 1
35405034	Tenejero	Pampanga 1 Electric Cooperative	PELCO 1
35405035	Vizal San Pablo	Manila Electric Company	Meralco
35405036	Vizal Santo Cristo	Manila Electric Company	Meralco
35405037	Vizal Santo Niño	Manila Electric Company	Meralco

== Government ==
Former seal of the municipality

The following are the duly elected officials of this town for the term 2022-2025:

Position	Name
Mayor	Rene E. Maglanque (PDP–Laban)
Vice Mayor	Restituto Sibug (PDP–Laban)
Councilors	Nelson Alonzo (PDP–Laban) Amy Rose Baylon (Independent) Joey Buco (Independent) Dan Gallarado (Independent) Carol Foz (Independent) Jun Gatus (Independent) Ate Thelma Macapagal (KAMBILAN) Siso Maglanque (PDP–Laban) Doña Salac (PDP–Laban) Maine Santiago (PDP–Laban)
ABC President	Pedy Balingit
SK Federation President	Luis Angelo Sagum

== Bird sanctuary ==
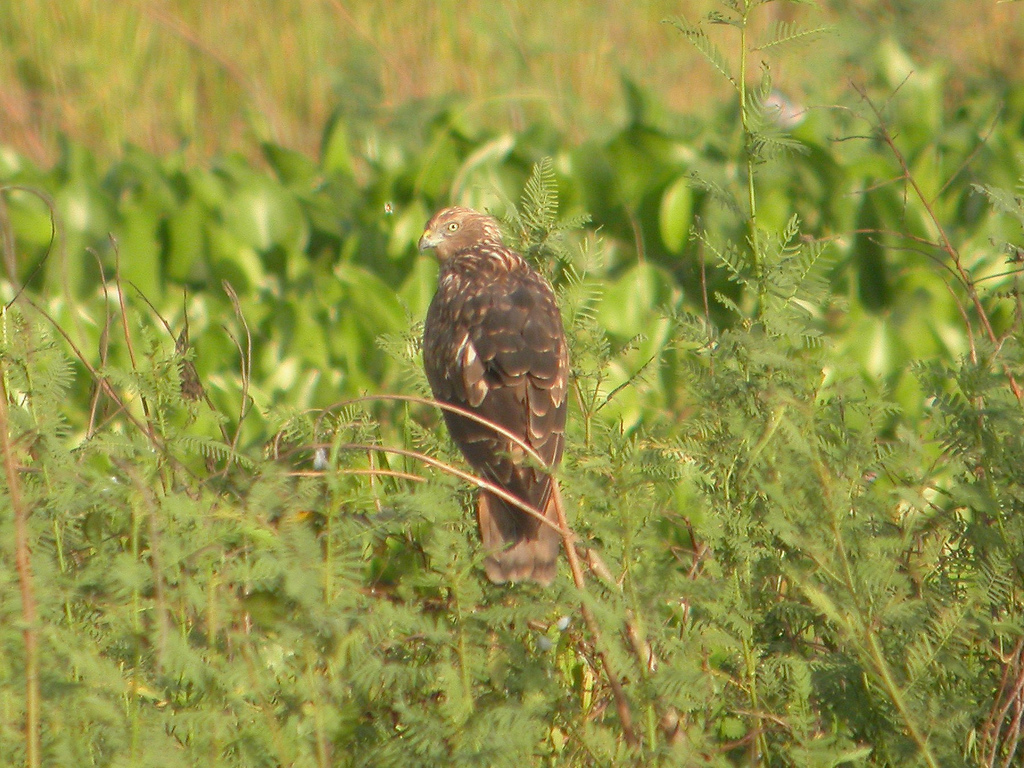
Eastern marsh harrier (Circus spilonotus), Candaba Marsh

In January 2008, a Philippine record of 17,000 birds (in the 24-hour count) visited the 32,000-hectare Candaba Swamp, sanctuary for migratory birds. There are 80 species of migratory birds were sighted at the 100-hectare fishpond of Mayor Jerry Pelayo in Barangay Doña Simang and in Barangay Paralaya. The rare birds spotted were: the Shrenck's bittern, great bittern, gadwall, coot, Philippine mallard or ducks, and Eurasian spoonbill (Platalea leucorodia). Robert S. Kennedy's book A Guide to the Birds of the Philippines lists endemic and migratory birds which visit the Philippines. Pelayo organized the Ibon-Ebon Festival (“birds and eggs”) on February 1–2. The WBCP recorded three rare species in Candaba swamp: the purple swamphen (Porphyrio porphyrio), Chinese pond heron (Ardeola bacchus) and the black-crowned night heron (Nycticorax nycticorax).

== Education ==
There are two schools district offices which govern all educational institutions within the municipality. They oversee the management and operations of all private and public, from primary to secondary schools. They are Candaba East Schools District Office, and Candaba West Schools District Office.

Candaba Elementary School

=== Primary and elementary schools ===
- Bahay Pare Elementary School
- Bambang Elementary School
- Barit Elementary School
- Candaba Ecumenical Learning Center
- Candaba Elementary School
- Dalayap Elementary School
- Divine Querubin Learning Academy
- Dulong Ilog Elementary School
- Eastern Candaba Christian School
- Gulap Elementary School
- Janielle Leigh Academy
- Lanang Elementary School
- Mandasig Elementary School
- Mangga Elementary School
- Paligue Elementary School
- Pangclara Elementary School
- Pansinao Elementary School
- Paralaya Elementary School
- Pasig Elementary School
- Pulong Gubat Elementary School
- Pulong Palazan Elementary School
- San Agustin Elementary School
- St. Peter Paul Academy of Vizal
- Sto. Rosario Elementary School
- Talang Elementary School
- Tenejero Elementary School
- Vizal San Pablo I Elementary School
- Vizal San Pablo II Elementary School
- Vizal Sto. Cristo Elementary School
- Vizal Sto. Niño Elementary School

Talang National High School

=== Secondary schools ===
- Bahay Pare National High School
- Lanang High School
- Mangga High School
- Mapaniqui National High School
- Paralaya High School
- Pasig National High School
- Pulong Gubat High School
- Salapungan National High School
- Salapungan National High School (Mandili Annex)
- Tagulod High School
- Talang National High School

=== Higher education institution ===
- Pampanga State University - Candaba Campus

== Notable personalities ==
- Cesar "Kuya Cesar" Nucum - Iconic radio personality known for his slow-paced, gentle delivery and his popular advice programs on DZMM, such as "Dear Kuya Cesar" and "Ikaw sa Likod ng mga Awit". A native of Barangay Pansinao, Candaba.
- Eddie del Mar - a FAMAS-winning Filipino actor, director, and producer who was born in Candaba, Pampanga. He became famous for his portrayals of national heroes, most notably for his role as José Rizal in the film Ang Buhay at Pag-ibig ni Dr. Jose Rizal and as Andres Bonifacio in Andres Bonifacio (Ang Supremo).
- Rafael Yabut - former Undersecretary and Acting Secretary of the Department of Public Works and Highways (DPWH).

== Bibliography ==
- Gatbonton, Manuel, Ing Candawe, excerpts, 1933.
- Henson, Mariano A., Pampanga and Its Towns (AD 1300-1965), Angeles: 1965.
- Licuanan, Virginia Benitez and Jose Llavador Mira, The Philippines Under Spain: A Compilation and Translation of Original Documents, Quezon City: 1993.
- Pangilinan, Michael Raymon M. (Siuala ding Meangubie), Five Thousand Years of Antiquity: A Timeline of Candaba History, Kapampangan Magazine, ed. by Elmer G. Cato, ISSN 1656-5592, Year 2004, Issue XV, pp. 11–12.
- Pangilinan, Michael Raymon M. (Siuala ding Meangubie), Candaba: Timelessly Mystical, Kapampangan Magazine, ed. by Elmer G. Cato, ISSN 1656-5592, Year 2004, Issue XV, pp. 16–17.
- San Agustin, Gaspar de, Conquistas de las Islas Filipinas; 1565–1615, 1st Bilingual Edition, Intramuros: 1998.
- The Historical Data Papers, Candaba, Bureau of Public Schools, 1953
- The Contemporary Chinese Dictionary (Chinese-English Edition), Foreign Language Teaching and Research Press, Beijing 2002.
