= Saint Vincent's Academy of Apalit Pampanga =

Private school in Pampanga, Philippines

Saint Vincent's Academy of Apalit, Pampanga, Inc.

Location
- Apalit, Pampanga; Philippines
- Coordinates: 14°57′06″N 120°45′49″E

Information
- Established: 1985
- School code: 300417; 401105 (BEIS School ID)

Saint Vincent's Academy of Apalit, Pampanga, Inc. is a non-sectarian private K-12 school in Apalit, Pampanga, Philippines. It was founded in 1985 through the efforts of the late Ms. Magdalene E. Lugue, and was formerly known as Saint Vincent's Child Study Center.

== Location ==
St. Vincent's Academy of Apalit is located in a semi-urban area surrounded by fruit-bearing trees that provide shade to pupils. It is attended in the border of San Vicente and San Juan (Poblacion). From the east, it is half a kilometer away from the municipal hall and puericulture center, and the Apalit Public Market lies to the west. The school is accessible via the Apalit Municipal road from the MacArthur Highway and the Apalit Poblacion. The institution is well known locally in Apalit and its surrounding municipalities in the provinces of Pampanga and Bulacan.

== History ==
The school was founded in 1985 by Ms. Magdalene E. Lugue, and was formerly known as Saint Vincent's Child Study Center. The school started with 18 pupils in pre-elementary education under the advisorship of Mrs. Melania Mendoza-Quiroz. In 2001, the elementary course struggled to house the growing population until more classrooms were put up.

The high school department was realized by the late administrator Mrs. Aurora Lugue-Sarmiento, the younger sister of the founder. Mr. Eduardo V. Lugue, one of the faculty members, was promoted as the principal of the high school department.

== Activities ==
The school has a high school basketball team. It is registered with the Fund for Assistance to Private Education.
