= San Simon Church =

Roman Catholic church in Pampanga, Philippines

San Simon Parish Church
- Nuestra Señora del Pilar Parish Church
- Our Lady of the Pillar Parish Church
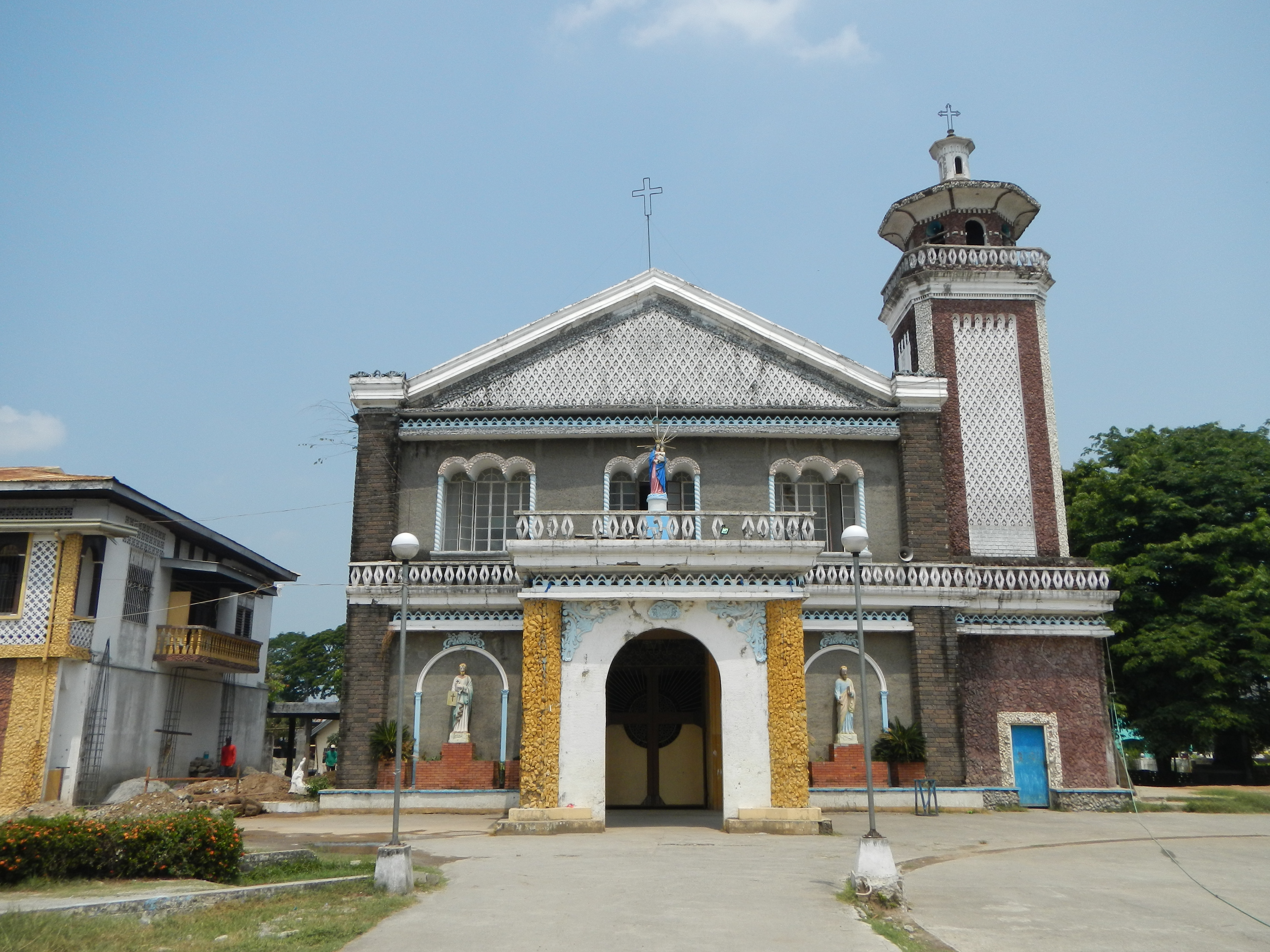
- Church facade in 2014

- Location in Luzon Location in the Philippines
- 14°59′53″N 120°46′45″E
- Location: San Juan, San Simon, Pampanga
- Country: Philippines
- Denomination: Roman Catholic

Architecture
- Functional status: Active
- Architect: Fr. Benito Ubierna
- Architectural type: Church building
- Style: Baroque, Barn-style Baroque
- Completed: 1870

Specifications
- Length: 55 metres (180 ft)
- Width: 13 metres (43 ft)
- Height: 11 metres (36 ft)
- Materials: Stone, Sand, Gravel, Cement, Steel

Administration
- Archdiocese: San Fernando

The Nuestra Señora del Pilar Parish Church, commonly known as San Simon Church, is a 19th-century Baroque Roman Catholic church located at Barangay San Juan, San Simon, Pampanga, Philippines. The parish church, under the protection of its patron saints, the Virgin of the Pillar and Saint Peter, is under the Archdiocese of San Fernando.

== History and architecture ==
The convent of San Simon was established by the Augustinians on April 20, 1771, and was placed under the patronage of Apostle Simon Peter. The town was formerly named after its secondary patron, Our Lady of the Pillar, and was purportedly named after its founder Mariano del Pilar de los Reyes. It was later renamed San Simon by Governor-General Simón de Anda y Salazar who named the town from his namesake upon the recommendation of his close allies, the Augustinian Friars. Governor-General Anda moved the capital of the colony to Pampanga a few years before the founding of the town due to the 1762 British Invasion. Not much historical records are available regarding the construction of the current church other than that a stone edifice was constructed by Father Benito Ubierna in 1870. A certain Father Bernabe built the convent in 1889. Both structures were burned down by Filipino revolutionaries on May 5, 1898.

Much of the stone walls of the church are intact while the façade and bell tower has been remodeled. The façade features a triangular pediment, three triple-arched windows on its second level and a concrete porte-cochere. To its left stands the rectangular belfry topped with a pagoda-like canopy.

== Gallery ==
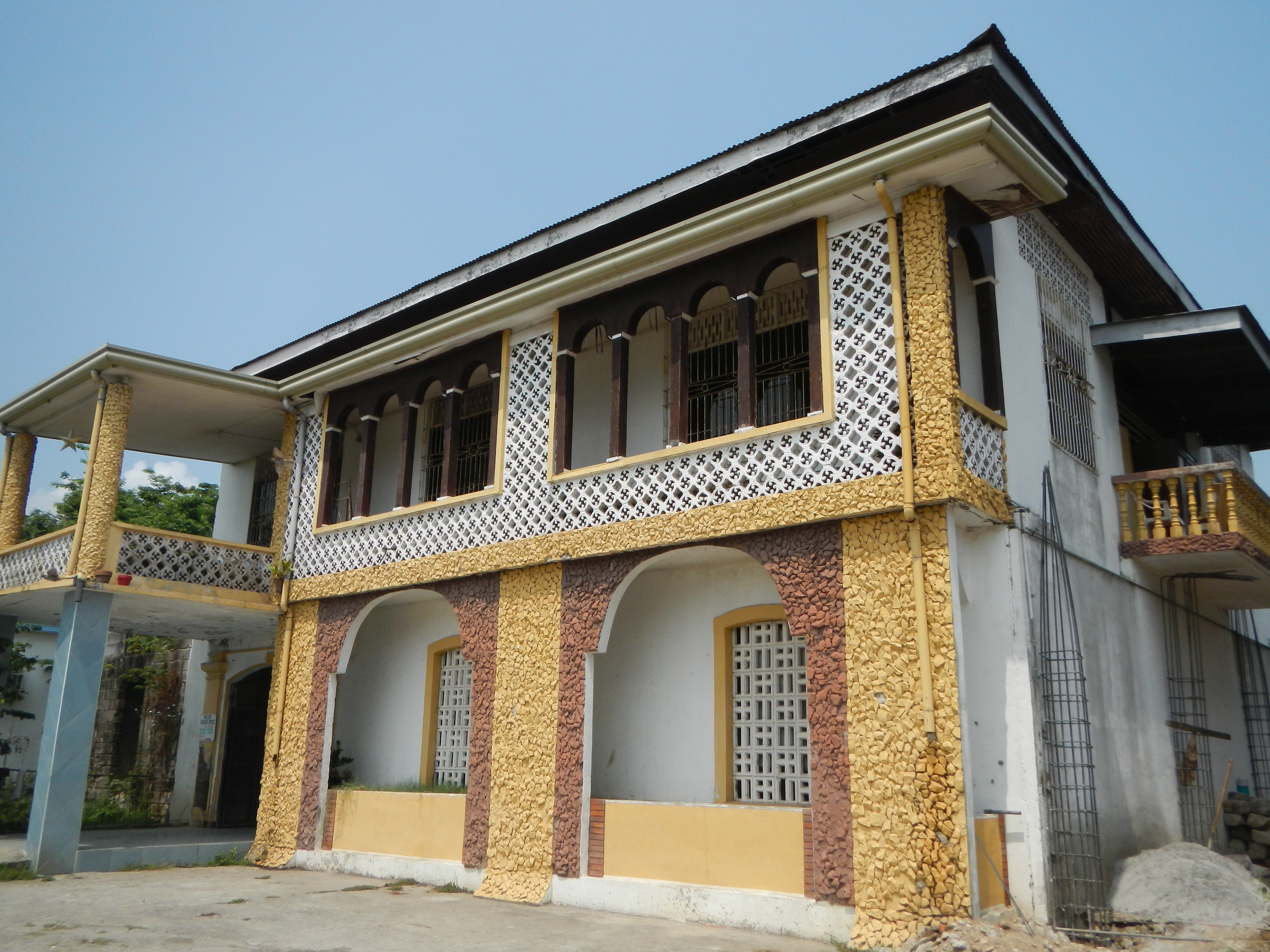
Convent

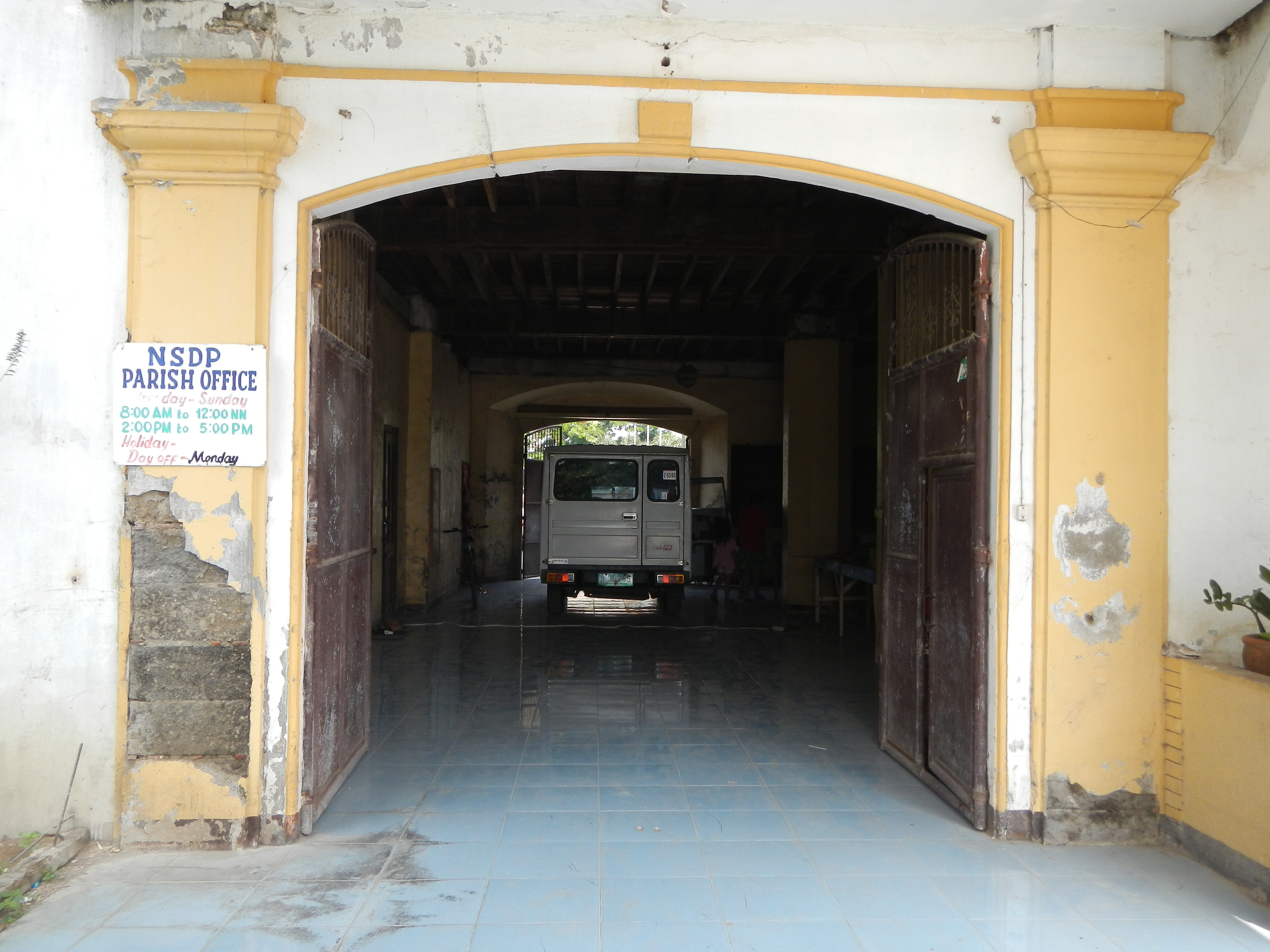
Convent entrance

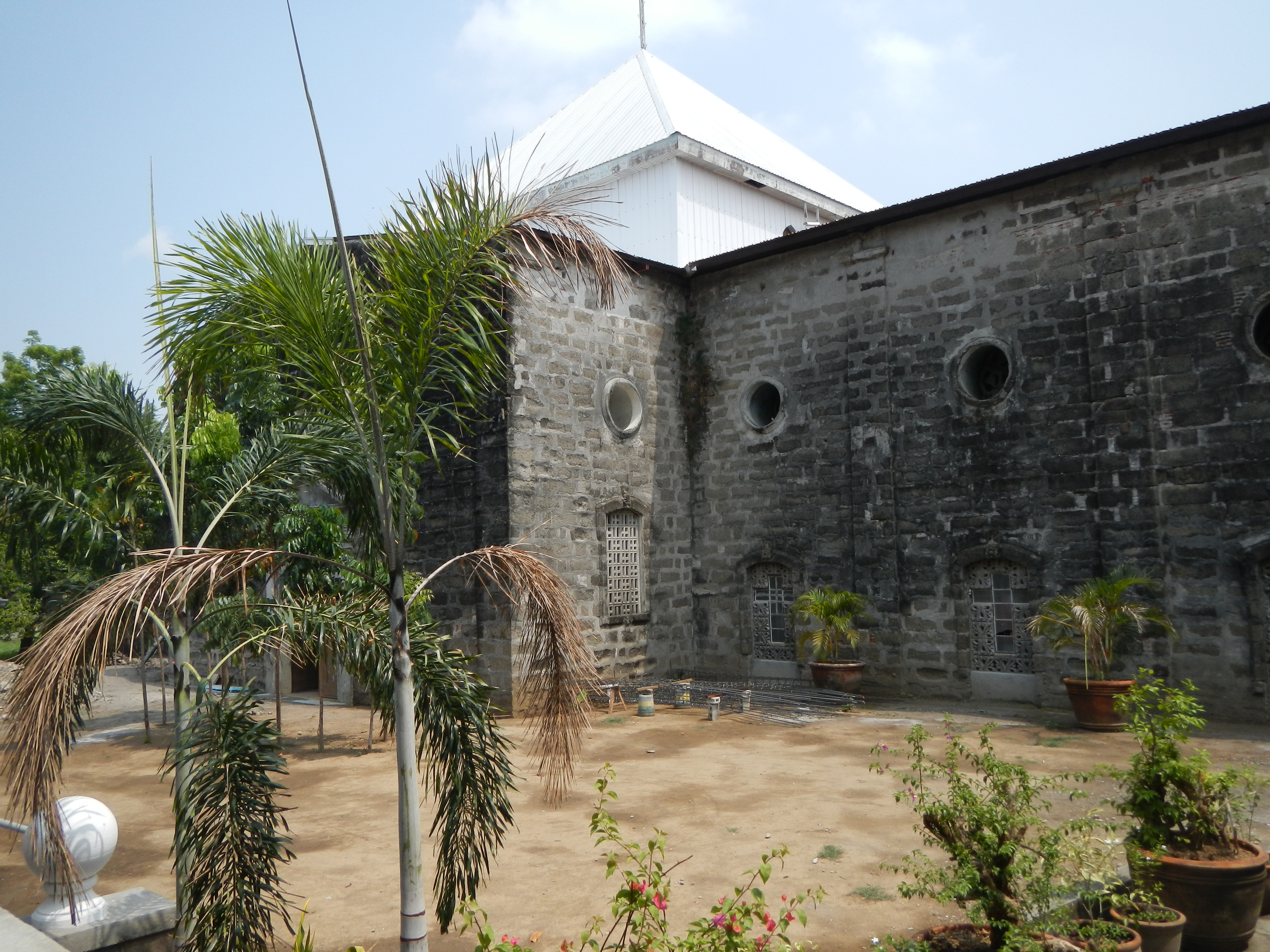
Side walls with pyramidal dome

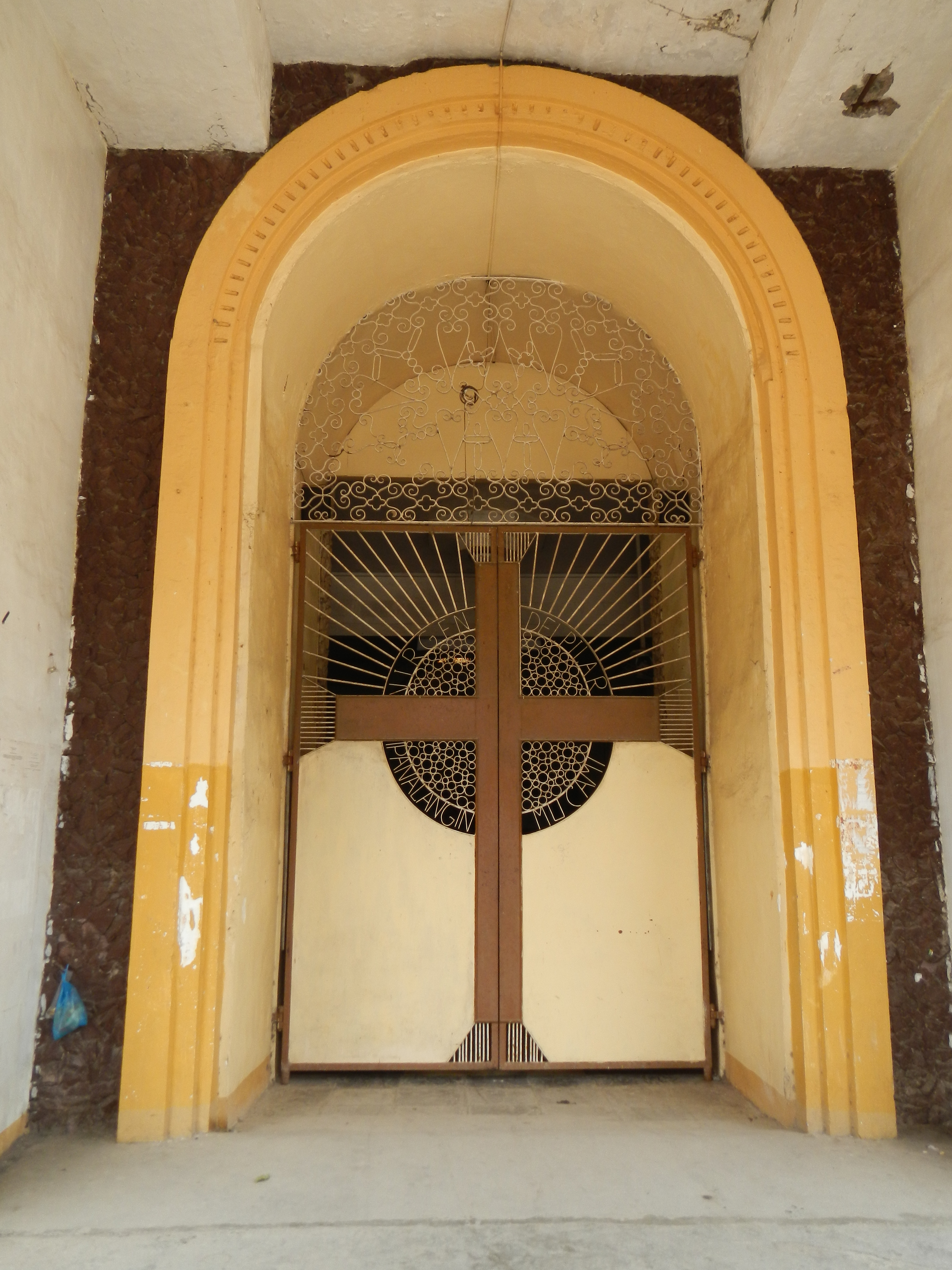
Main portal with steel doors

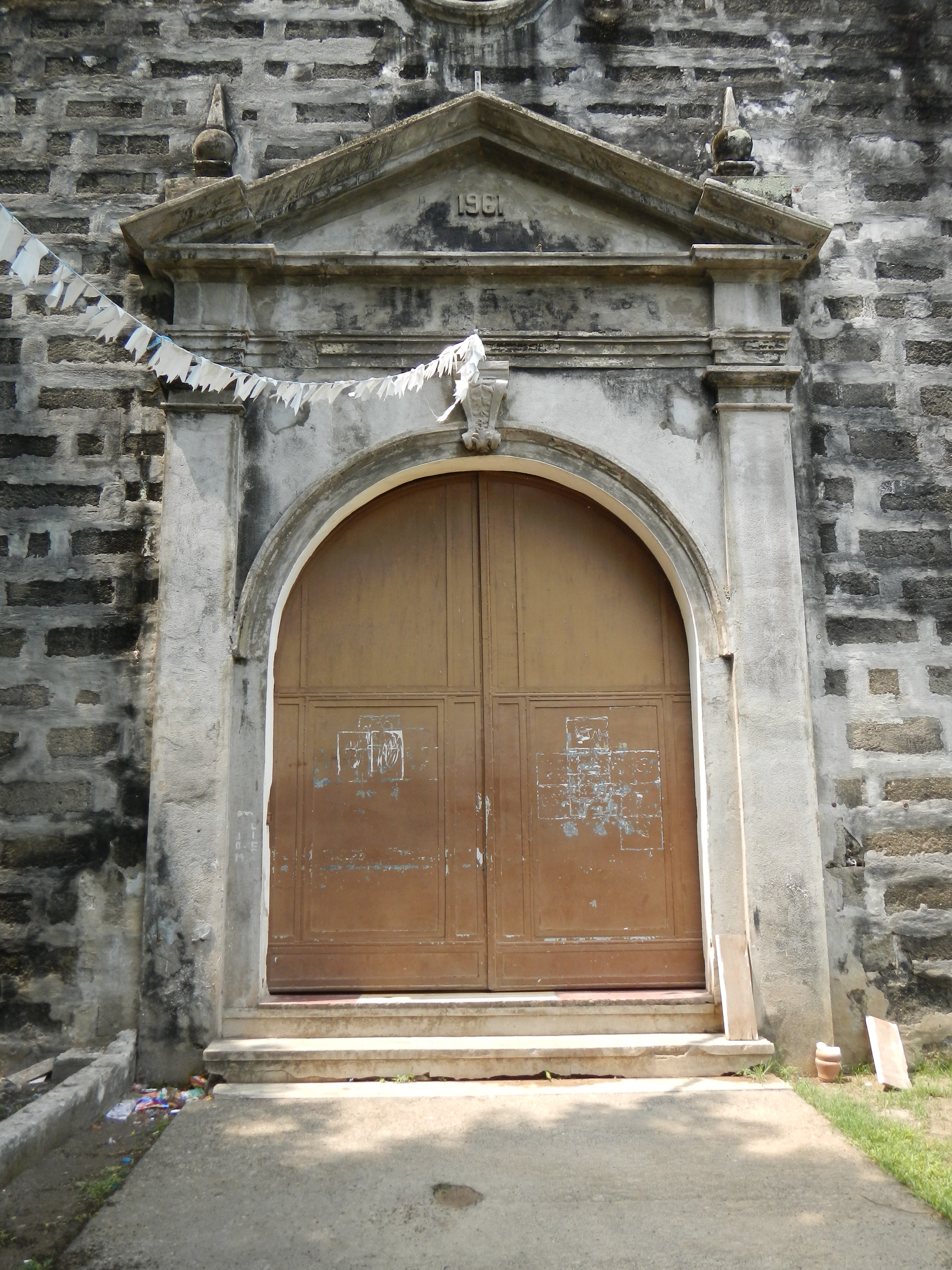
Side portal decorated with a triangular pediment

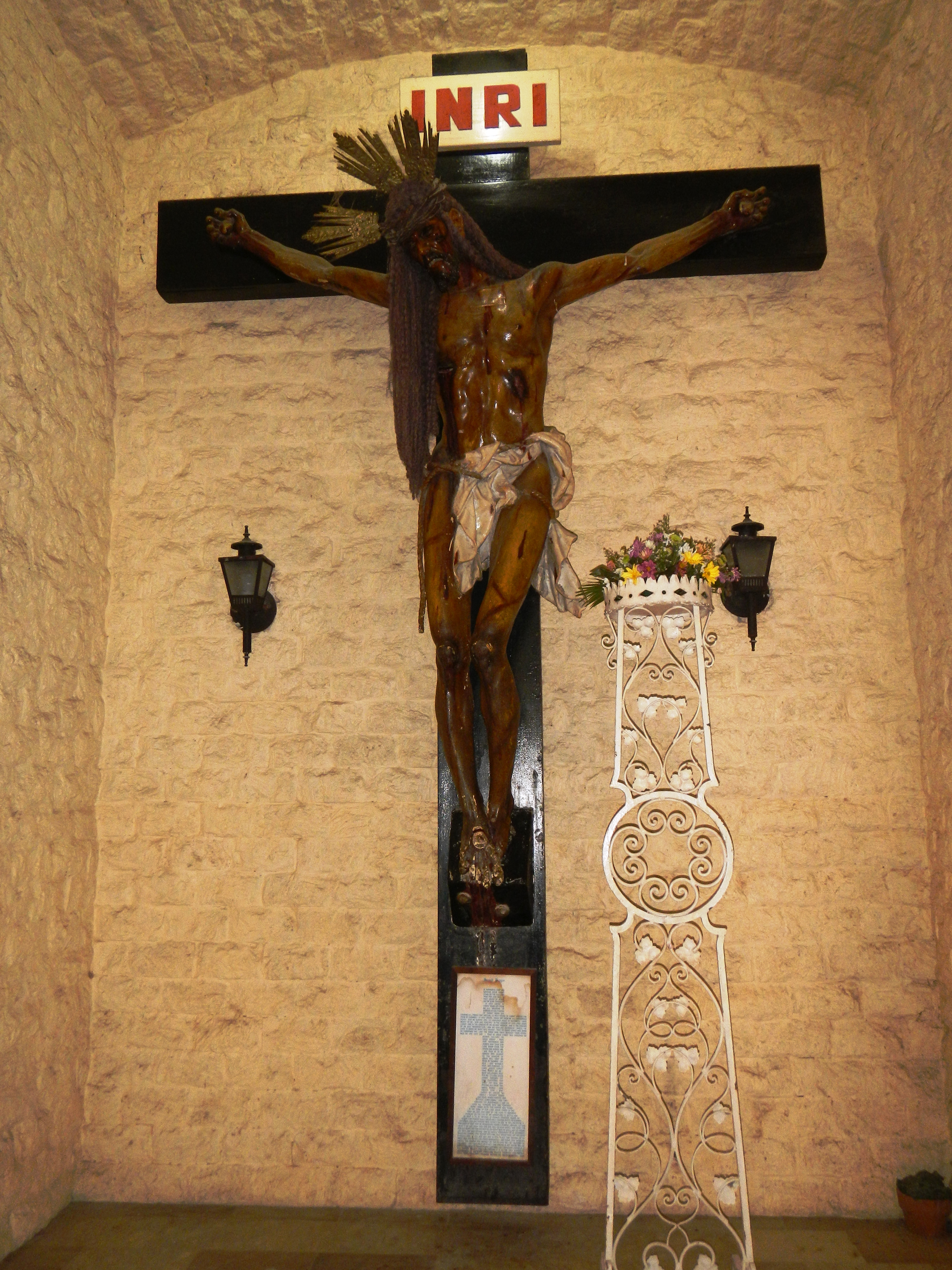
Crucifix

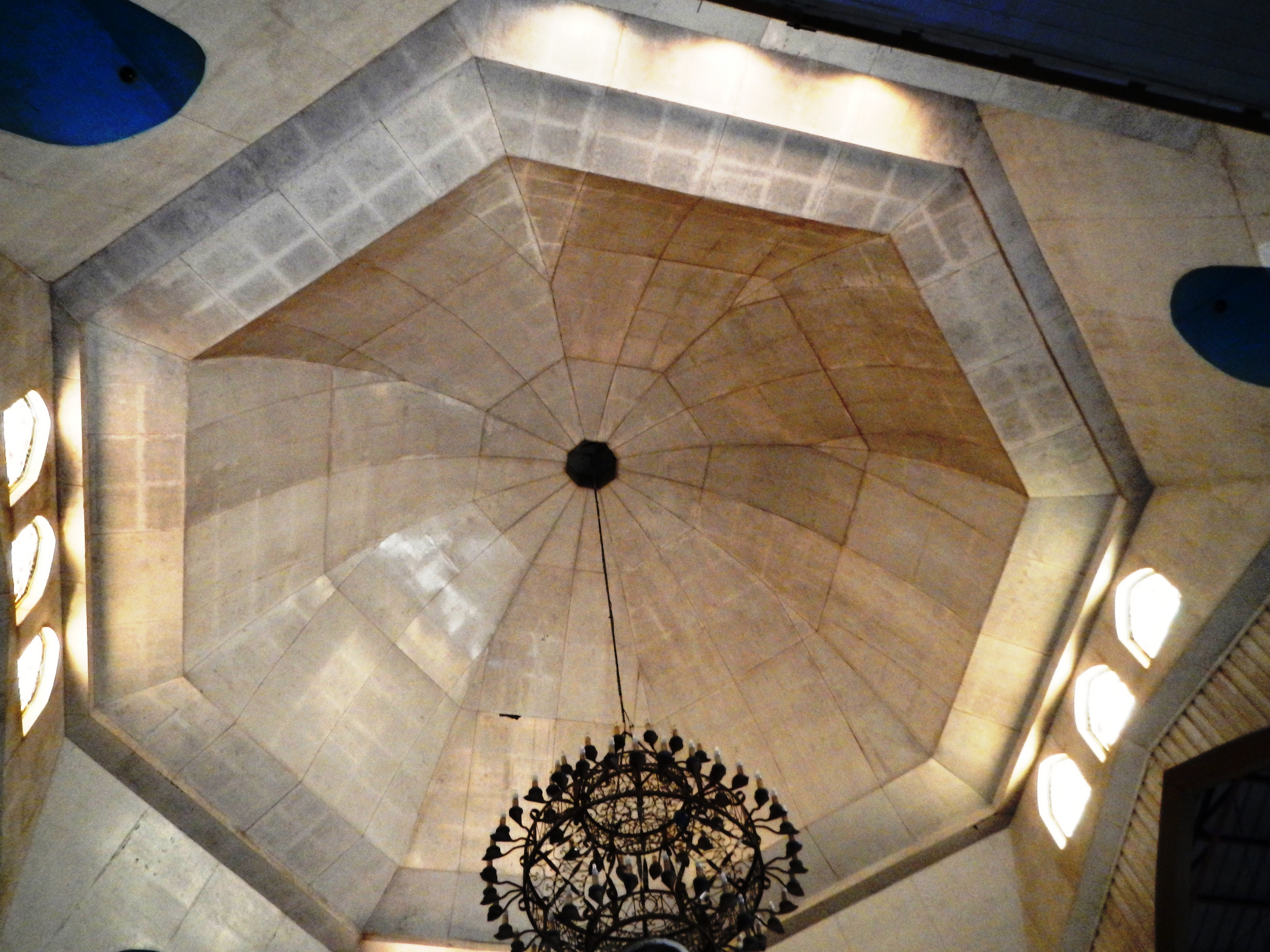
Dome interior

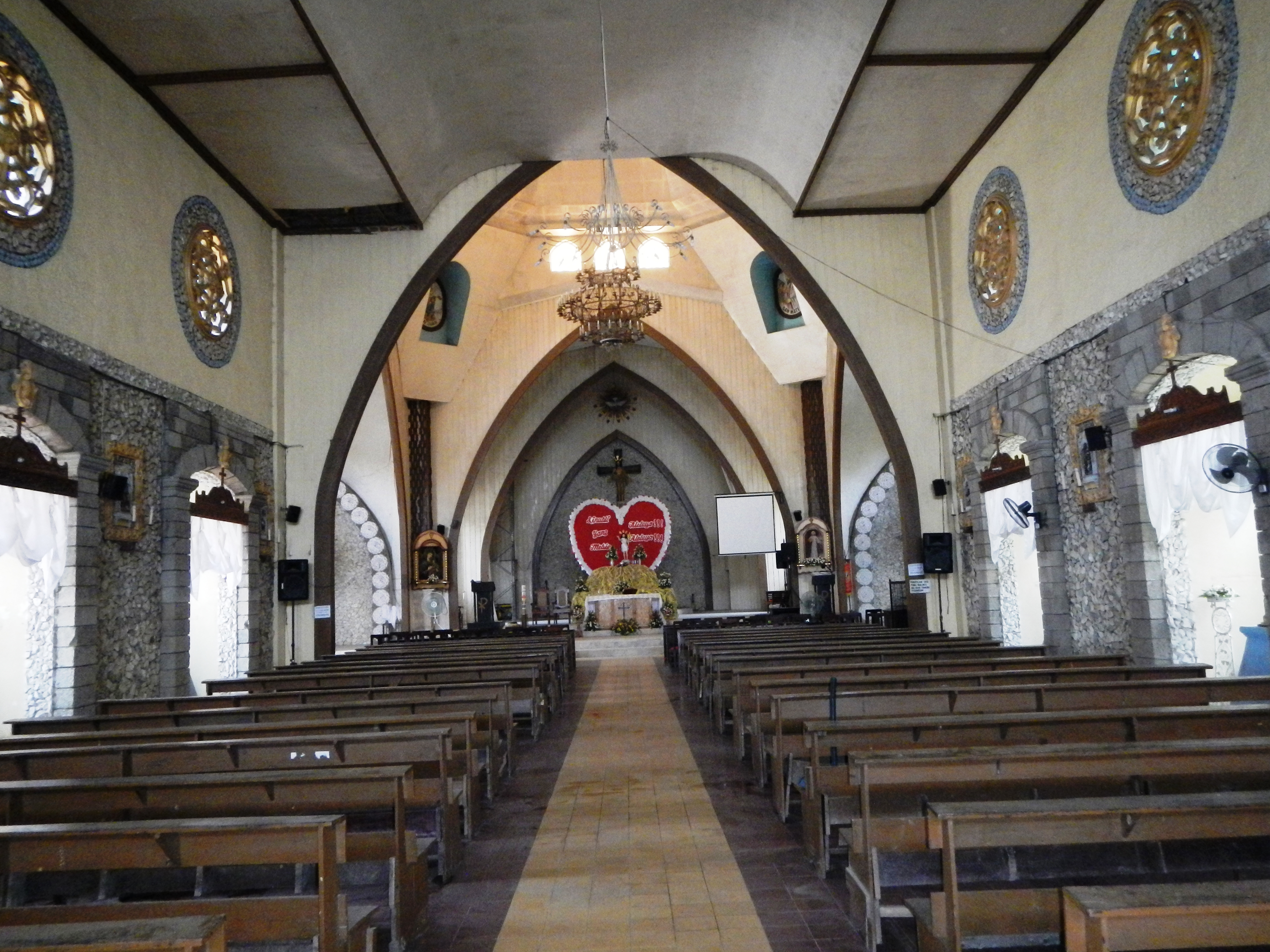
Church nave in 2014

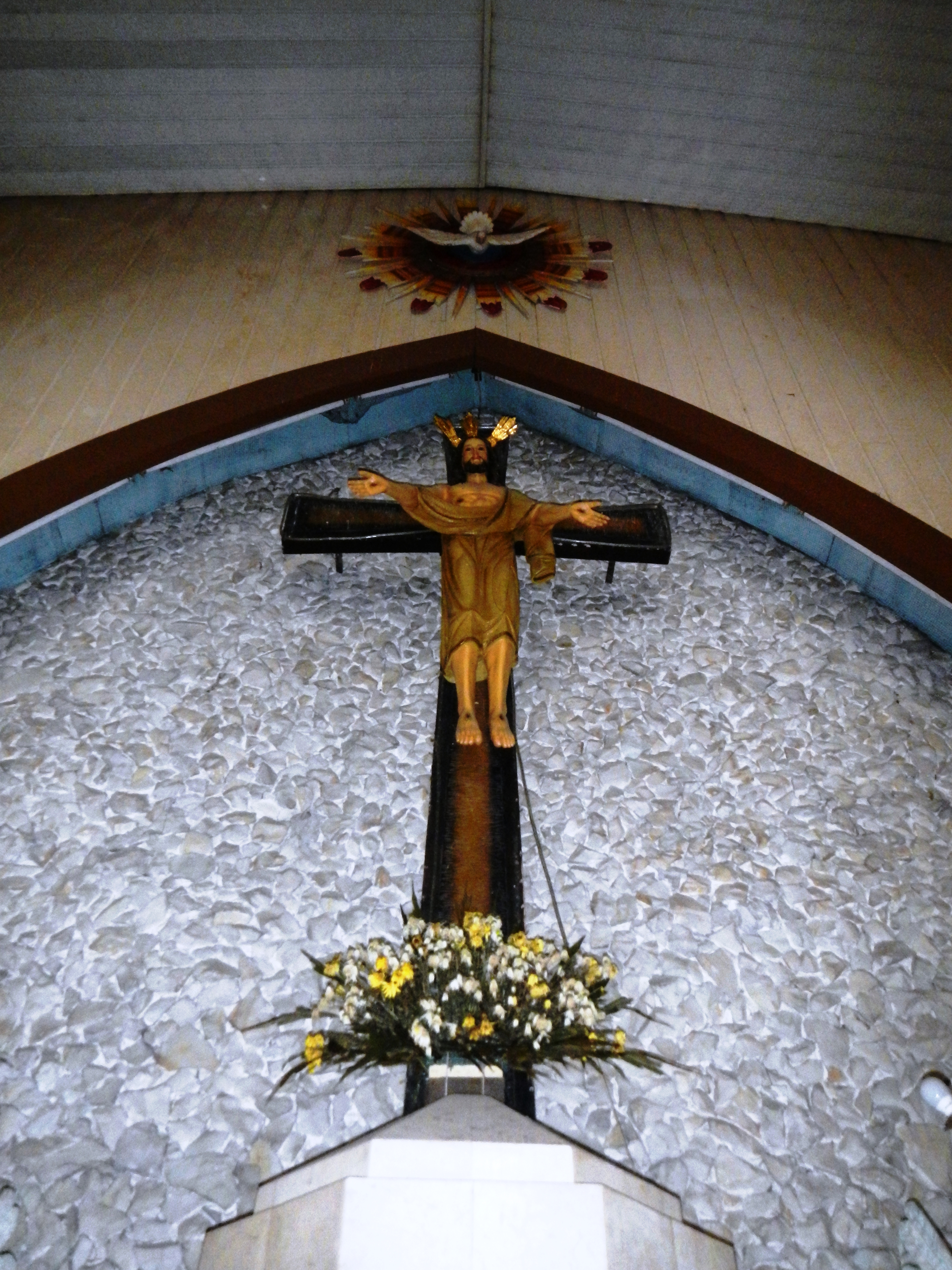
Main altarpiece

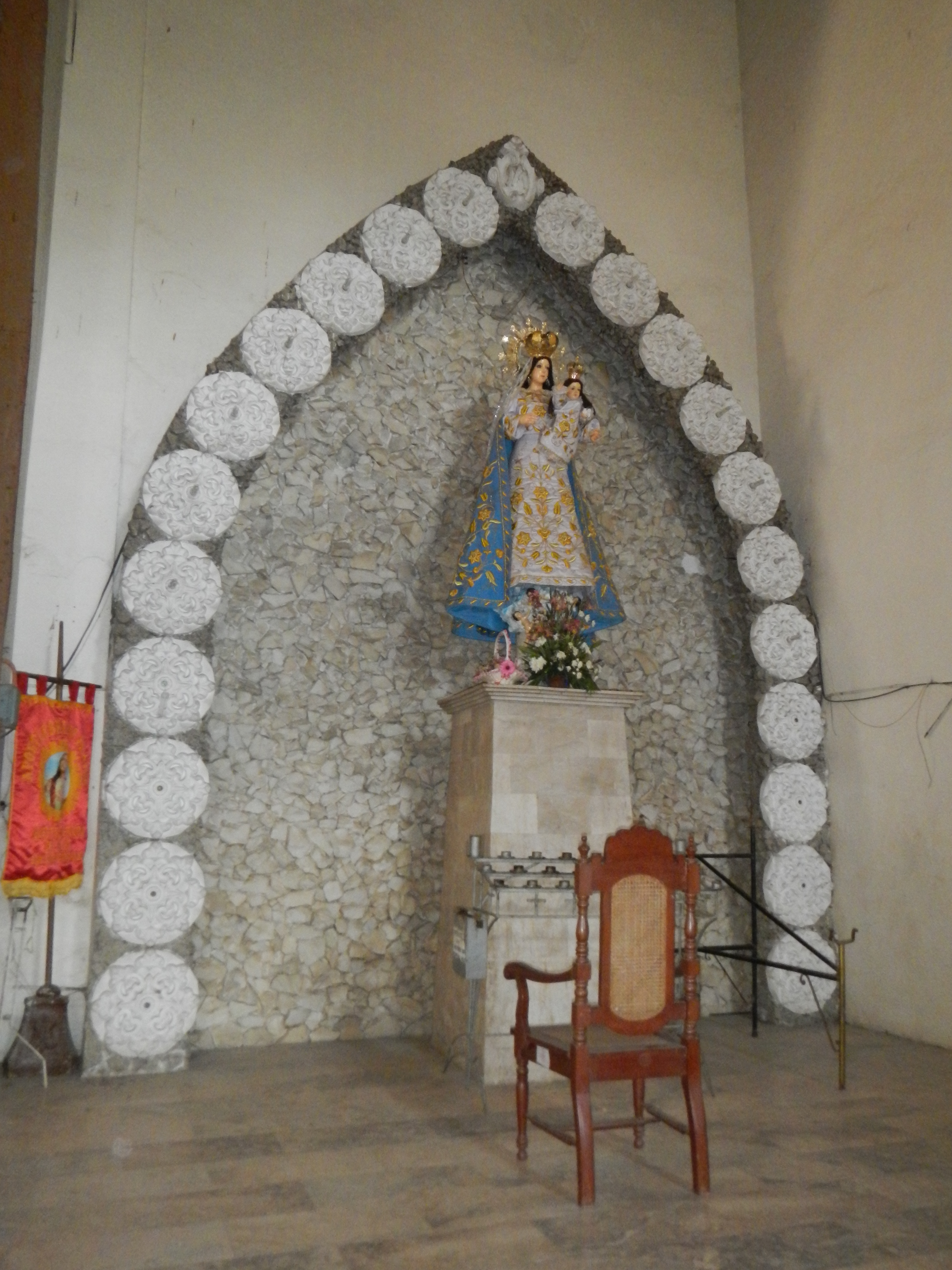
Side altarpiece with image of the patron saint
