= Santo Rosario Sapang Palay College =

Roman Catholic college in Bulacan, Philippines

Coordinates: 14°52′01″N 121°03′52″E

Sto. Rosario Sapang Palay College, Inc. (SRSPC) is a Catholic educational institution in San Jose del Monte City, Bulacan, Philippines. It is operated by the Diocese of Malolos. It offers the Bachelor of Arts and Bachelor of Science degrees. It also offers preschool through high school education.

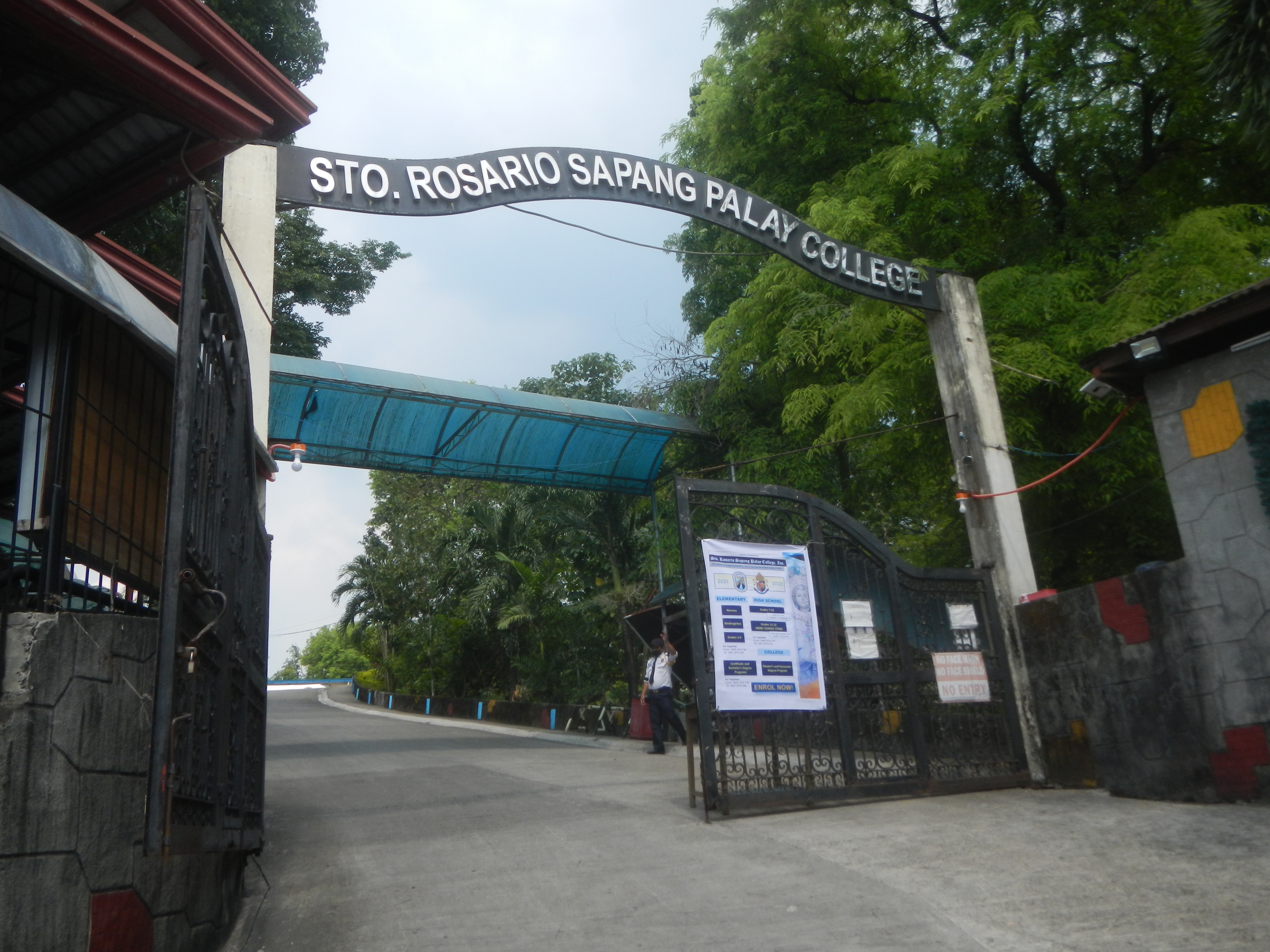
Facade, 2021

== High School Department Strands for Senior High School ==
Academic Track	Technical-Vocational Track (Tech-Voc Track)
Science, Technology, Engineering, and Mathematics Strand (STEM)	Computer Hardware Servicing
Humanities and Social Sciences Strand (HUMSS)	Food and Beverages Services
Accountancy, Business and Management Strand (ABM)	Computer Programming

== History ==
Sto. Rosario Sapang Palay College is a Catholic Diocesan Institution of the Diocese of Malolos, a member of the Malolos Diocesan Association (MADICSA) and Catholic Education of the Philippines (CEAP).

SRSPC was formerly known as Assumption Sapang Palay College, Inc., which is closely linked with the Sapang Palay Resettlement and Sto. Rosario Parish of Sapang Palay.

Date	Event
1965	The Carmelite Fathers (OCD) of Mt. Carmel Quezon City through an Irish Catholic Missionary Fr. Edward Alban Kelly, OCD acceded to the request of the people to establish a Catholic School to barrio Bagong Buhay. He began searching for funds and for the site of the school.
March 25, 1966	The school received donations from the students of Assumption San Lorenzo in Makati through Mother Ezperanza, for the construction of the first six classrooms. The school was named Assumption Sapang Palay as an expression of gratitude to the donor; however, it is independent from Assumption San Lorenzo in Makati.
1966–1981	The sisters of the Religious of the Virgin Mary (RVM) assisted in the administration of the school.
January 11, 1995	Edward Alban Kelly, the chairman of the Board of Trustees of Assumption Sapang Palay College, Inc. donated the school to the Diocese of Malolos through Bishop Cirilo R. Almario, Jr. D.D.
February 8, 1995	The school was officially turned over the Diocese of Malolos. It became the Parochial School of the Parish of Sto. Rosario, Sapang Palay, San Jose del Monte City, Bulacan. Rev. Fr. Josefino Victor S. Sebastian was appointed as the first Diocesan School Rector by Bishop Cirilo R. Almario, D.D. He was assisted by the parochial vicars, Rev. Fr. Gil Cajurao and Rev. Fr. Alejandro Enriquez, as the vice rectors. The Dominican Sisters of St. Joseph helped in administration of the school for three consecutive years.
March 1995	Assumption Sapang Palay College was changed into Sto. Rosario Sapang Palay College.
1995	The Elementary grades I - IV and Secondary Courses received the Government Recognition. CHED granted Government Recognition to the following programs: Bachelor of Science in Accountancy (BSA); Bachelor of Science in Office Administration (BSOA); Two-Year Secretarial Course; Two-Year Associate in Computer Science Course (ACS); One-Year General Clerical Course
1996	The Commission on Higher Education (CHED) granted Recognition to three programs in the college: Bachelor of Science in Elementary Education, and Bachelor of Arts (Liberal Arts). One-Year General Clerical Courses was closed.
1998	The Religious Catechist of Mary (RCM) took over the Dominican Sisters. They assisted on the administration of the School.
February 5, 2001	Rev. Fr. Virgilio Wilfredo M. Cruz was appointed as the Rector/Dean and Rev. Fr. Romeo Sasi as the Vice Rector by Most Reverend Rolando J. Tria Tirona, OCD, D.D., Bishop of Malolos.
2002	The Government though the Commission on Higher Education (CHED) granted Recognition to Bachelor of Science in Computer Science (BSCS).
2003	The Commission on Higher Education (CHED) recognition was granted to the Bachelor of Business Administration (BSBA) courses, major in Management Accounting and Marketing.
November 9, 2003	The Department of Education (DepED) and Fund for Assistance to Private Education (FAFE) inspected SRSPC and its areas of operation.
January 5, 2004	Rev. Fr. Virgilio C. Ramos was installed as the rector/dean by Most Rev. Jose F. Oliveros, D.D., Bishop of Malolos with Rev. Fr. Rolando Espiritu as the Vice Rector.
2006–2008	The following instructional facilities were renovated and improved such as Science Laboratory, Library Physical Setup, Home Economics Room, and Computer Laboratory. Speech Laboratory was built. Pre School classrooms were air-conditioned.
June 10, 2009	Rev. Fr. Teodoro F. Bulawit was welcomed to the SRSPC family.
June 30, 2009	Rev. Fr. Bulawit was appointed as rector/dean and Rev. Fr. Ulysses Reyes as the vice rector by the Most Rev. Jose F. Oliveros, D.D., Bishop of Malolos.
August 22, 2009	Rev Fr. Bulawit was installed as the rector/dean by Most Rev. Jose F. Oliveros, D.D., with Rev. Fr. Ulysses Reyes as the vice rector.
