= San Simon, Pampanga =

Municipality in Pampanga, Philippines

San Simon
- Municipality
- Municipality of San Simon
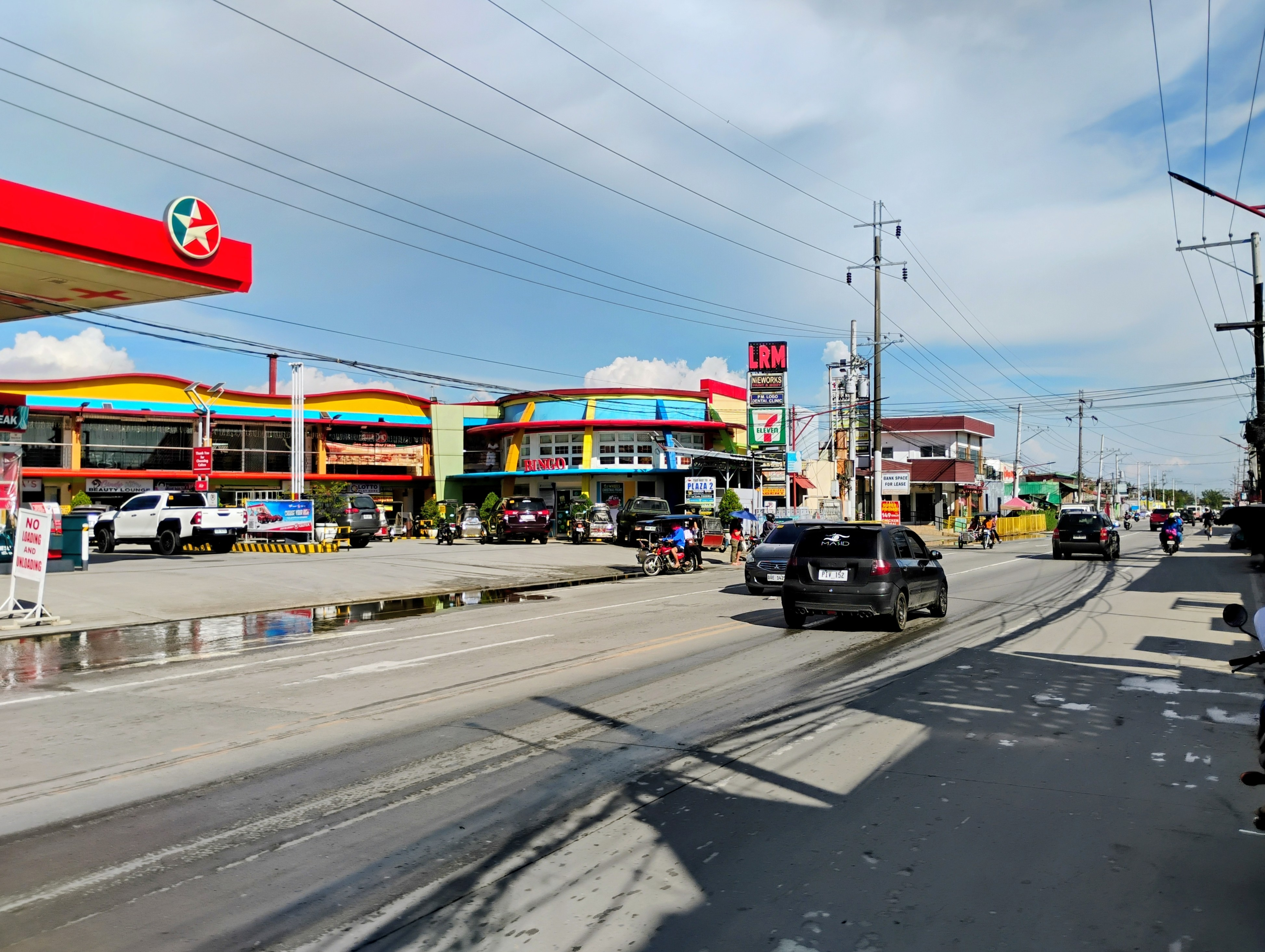
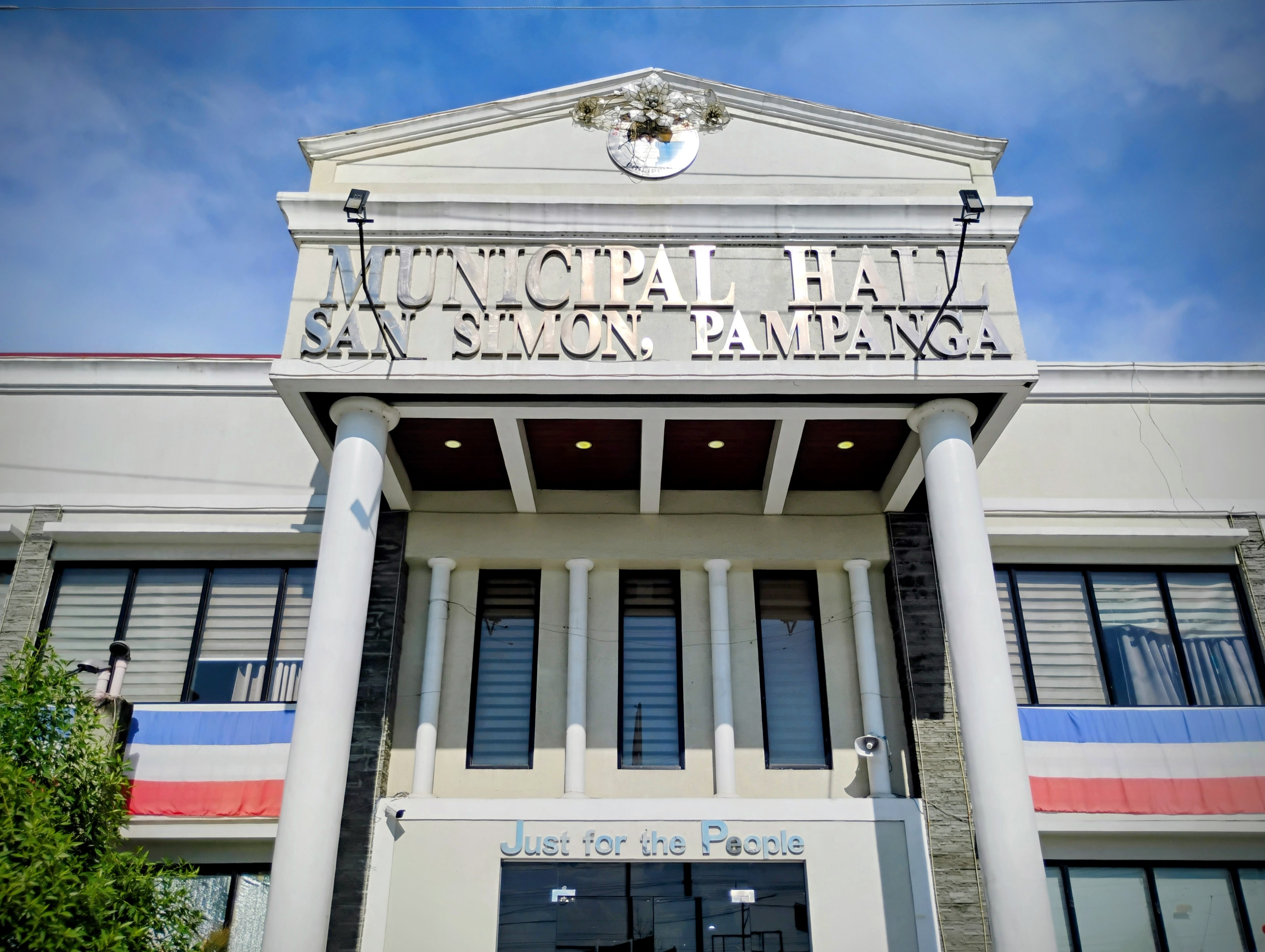
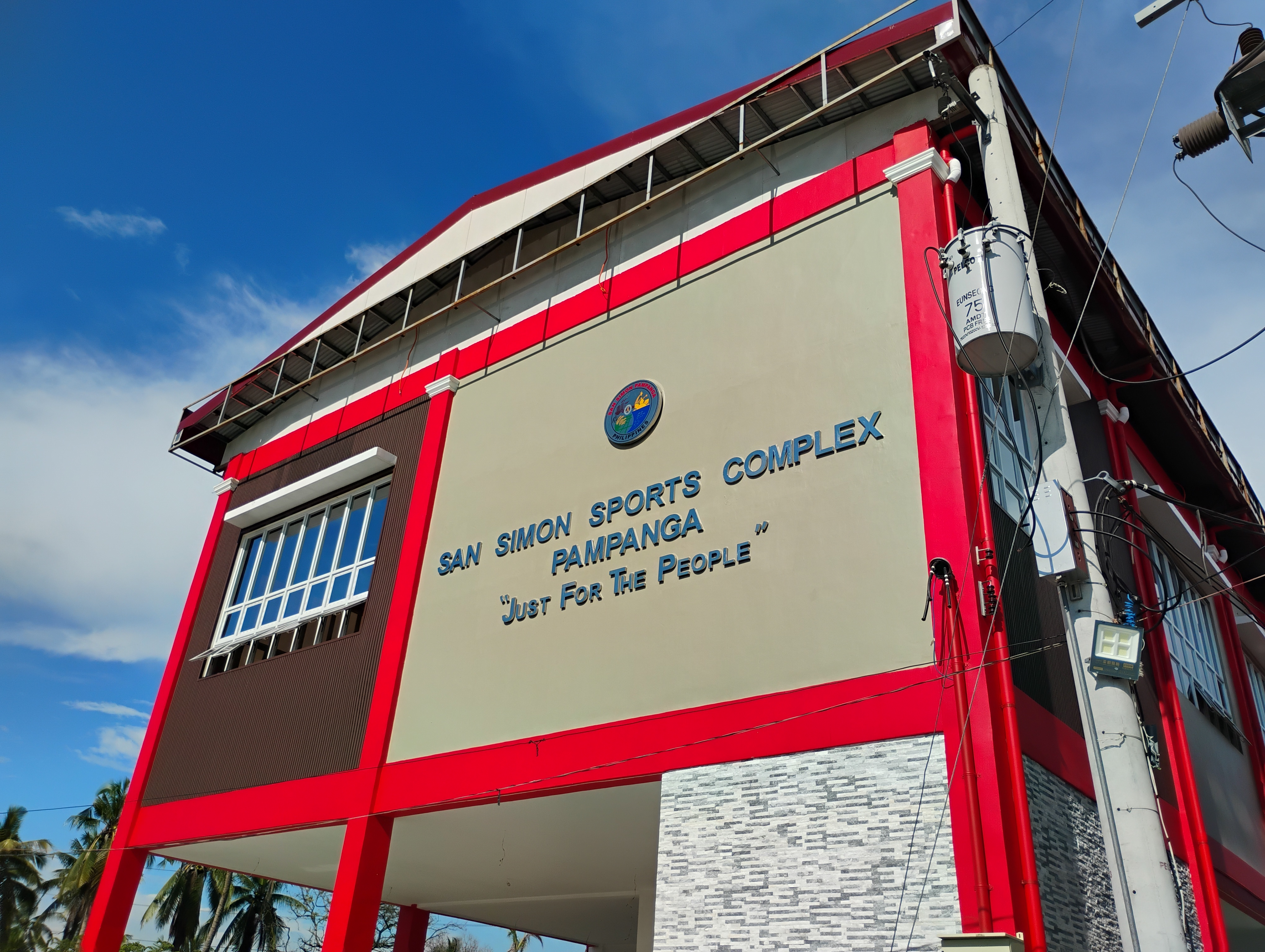
- Downtown Area San Simon Municipal Hall San Simon Sports Complex

- Seal

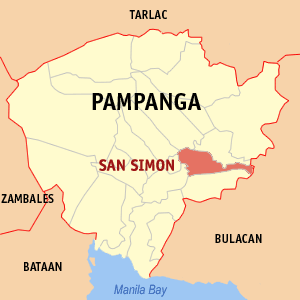
- Map of Pampanga with San Simon highlighted
- Interactive map of San Simon
- Location within the Philippines
- Coordinates: 14°59′53″N 120°46′48″E
- Country: Philippines
- Region: Central Luzon
- Province: Pampanga
- District: 4th district
- Founded: November 15, 1771
- Named for: Simón de Anda y Salazar Saint Peter
- Barangays: 14 (see Barangays)

Government
  - Type: Sangguniang Bayan
  - Mayor: Anne Canlas (acting)
  - Vice Mayor: Keko Almario
  - Representative: Anna York P. Bondoc
  - Municipal Council: Members: Ryan V. Viray; Irene B. David; Randell P. Bondoc; Rodolfo J. Bravo; Jerry N. Quiambao; David M. Dungo; Irene B. Dagdag; Rogelio E. Salvador Jr.
  - Electorate: 45,430 voters (2025)

Area
  - Total: 57.37 km^{2} (22.15 sq mi)
- Elevation: 7.0 m (23.0 ft)
- Highest elevation: 23 m (75 ft)
- Lowest elevation: 0 m (0 ft)

Population (2024 census)
  - Total: 65,760
  - Density: 1,146/km^{2} (2,969/sq mi)
  - Households: 13,635

Economy
  - Income class: 1st municipal income class
  - Poverty incidence: 8.38% (2023)
  - Revenue: ₱ 380.4 million (2024)
  - Assets: ₱ 739.9 million (2024)
  - Expenditure: ₱ 291.9 million (2024)
  - Liabilities: ₱ 134 million (2024)

Service provider
  - Electricity: Pampanga 3 Electric Cooperative (PELCO 3)
- Time zone: UTC+8 (PST)
- ZIP code: 2015
- PSGC: 0305418000
- IDD : area code: +63 (0)45
- Native languages: Kapampangan; Tagalog

San Simon, officially the Municipality of San Simon (Kapampangan: Balen ning San Simon; Tagalog: Bayan ng San Simon), is a municipality in the province of Pampanga, Philippines. According to the 2024 census, it has a population of 65,760 people.

== History ==
In 1770, Don Mariano del Pilar de los Reyes founded a farming village named 'Barrio Del Pilar', which later became the town of San Simon. The village was located between the towns of San Luis in the north and Apalit in the south. As the population of the village kept on growing, the village leaders of that time petitioned to consolidate the village and portions of the towns of San Luis and Apalit, to form an independent pueblo (town).

On November 15, 1771, Don Simón de Anda y Salazar, the governor general of the Philippines at that time, approved the official creation of the town. The town was named after the Spanish governor general who approved its creation and of the Apostle Simon Peter, the patron saint of Apalit.

In 1898, the retreating forces of General Antonio Luna, on their way to Nueva Ecija, burned the town's parish church. The church was only rebuilt after almost a century in 1979.

From 1904 to 1907, San Simon was merged with San Luis. In 1920, the geographical boundaries of the towns of Apalit, San Luis, and San Simon were officially established.

By 1835, San Simon had eight barrios (barangay). But in the late 1940s, the population grew and the number of barrios were increased to fourteen, which has been maintained until the present times.

== Geography ==
San Simon is accessible via the North Luzon Expressway via the San Simon current exit. It is 8 kilometres (5.0 mi) from San Fernando, 58 kilometres (36 mi) from Manila, and 19 kilometres (12 mi) from Baliwag.

=== Barangays ===
San Simon is politically subdivided into 14 barangays, as shown below. Each barangay consists of puroks and some have sitios.

- Concepcion
- De La Paz
- San Juan (Poblacion)
- San Agustin
- San Isidro
- San Jose
- San Miguel
- San Nicolas
- San Pablo Libutad
- San Pablo Proper
- San Pedro
- Santa Cruz
- Santa Monica
- Santo Niño

=== Climate ===
Climate data for San Simon, Pampanga
Month	Jan	Feb	Mar	Apr	May	Jun	Jul	Aug	Sep	Oct	Nov	Dec	Year
Mean daily maximum °C (°F)	28 (82)	29 (84)	31 (88)	33 (91)	32 (90)	31 (88)	30 (86)	29 (84)	29 (84)	30 (86)	30 (86)	28 (82)	30 (86)
Mean daily minimum °C (°F)	20 (68)	20 (68)	21 (70)	23 (73)	24 (75)	24 (75)	24 (75)	24 (75)	24 (75)	23 (73)	22 (72)	21 (70)	23 (72)
Average precipitation mm (inches)	6 (0.2)	4 (0.2)	6 (0.2)	17 (0.7)	82 (3.2)	122 (4.8)	151 (5.9)	123 (4.8)	124 (4.9)	99 (3.9)	37 (1.5)	21 (0.8)	792 (31.1)
Average rainy days	3.3	2.5	3.6	6.6	17.7	22.2	25.2	23.7	23.2	17.9	9.2	5.2	160.3
Source: Meteoblue

== Demographics ==
Population census of San Simon

Year	Pop.	±% p.a.
1903	6,764	—
1918	6,992	+0.22%
1939	8,940	+1.18%
1948	9,607	+0.80%
1960	13,549	+2.91%
1970	19,147	+3.51%
1975	21,553	+2.40%
1980	23,518	+1.76%

Year	Pop.	±% p.a.
1990	30,678	+2.69%
1995	35,474	+2.76%
2000	41,253	+3.29%
2007	48,050	+2.13%
2010	48,353	+0.23%
2015	53,198	+1.84%
2020	59,182	+2.27%
2024	65,760	+2.56%

Source: Philippine Statistics Authority

In the 2024 census, the population of San Simon was 65,760 people, with a density of 1,100 inhabitants per square kilometre or 2,800 inhabitants per square mile.

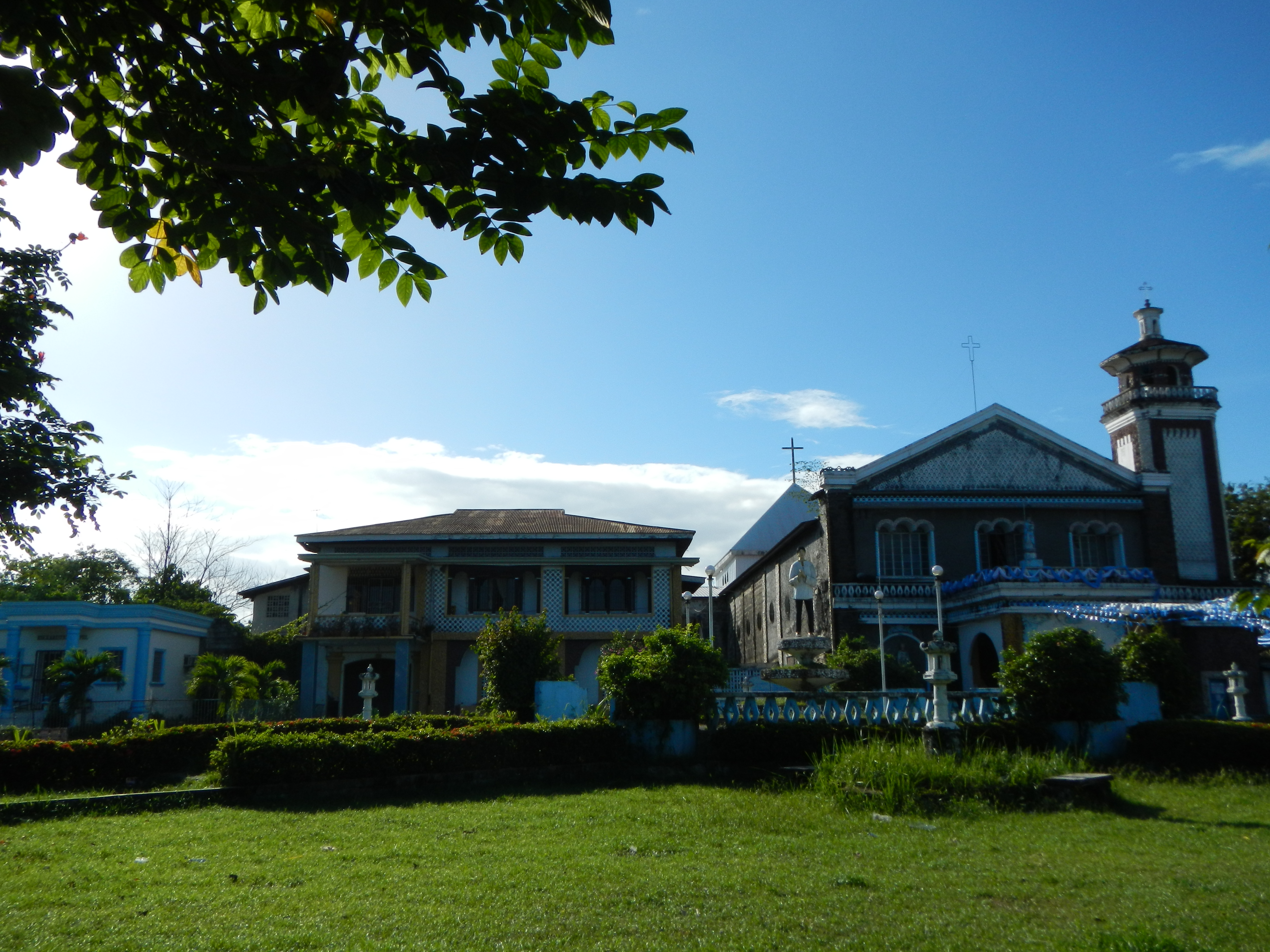
1771 Virgen del Pilar Parish Church and convent

=== Religion ===
The Roman Catholic Archdiocese of San Fernando has jurisdiction over the 1771 Virgen del Pilar Parish Church.

Like most Kapampangan people, residents of San Simon retain their Kapampangan language and traditional culture and arts brought about by their Malay ancestors and enriched by Chinese, Spanish, American, Japanese and other ethnic and foreign cultures. Religious affiliations are:

- Catholic 80%
- Members Church of God International 10%
- Iglesia ni Cristo 7%
- others 3%

== Economy ==
Poverty incidence of San Simon (%)

Source: Philippine Statistics Authority

The principal industries in San Simon are farming, fishing and poultry and swine industries. There are two public markets in San Simon, one in the old poblacion area and another one located in the industrial zone area.

== Government ==
=== Local government ===
San Simon is governed by a mayor and vice mayor who are elected to three-year terms. The mayor is the executive head and leads the town's departments in executing the ordinances and improving public services. The vice mayor heads a legislative council (Sangguniang Bayan) consisting of councilors from the barangays of barrios.

=== List of local chief executives ===
Available records at the Municipal Hall list the following town executives from 1898 until present:

Year	Name	Title
1898	Juan Agulo	Kapitan del Pueblo
1899	Solomon Ibanez	Kapitan del Pueblo
1900	Diego de los Santos	Kapitan del Pueblo
1901	Macario Santos	Kapitan del Pueblo
1902	Basilio de los Santos	Kapitan del Pueblo
1903	Manuel Ibanez	Kapitan del Pueblo
1904	Mariano Pangan	Kapitan del Pueblo
1905	Mariano Vergara	Kapitan del Pueblo
1906–1908	Sisenando Pineda	Presidente Municipal (merged with San Luis)
1908–1910	Pablo Cruz	Presidente Municipal (merged with San Luis)
1910–1912	Teodoro Punsalan	Presidente Municipal
1913–1915	Macario Perez	Presidente Municipal
1916–1918	Urbano Guevara	Presidente Municipal
1919–1924	Servillano Ibanez	Presidente Municipal
1925–1927	Ramon Tuano	Presidente Municipal
1935–1936	Catalino Ibanez	Appointed Mayor
1937–1938	Domingo Pineda	Appointed Mayor
1938–1939	Patrocinio Yabut	Acting Mayor
1939–1941	Patrocinio Yabut	Elected Mayor
1941–1942	Agustin Sese	Acting Mayor
1942–1944	Ramon Ibanez	Appointed Mayor by Japanese
1945–1946	Felipe Almario	Appointed Mayor
1946	Eusebio Francisco	Appointed Mayor
1947–1949	Fernando Galang	Appointed Mayor
1949–1952	Jose S. Yabut Sr.	Elected Mayor
1953–1956	Gregorio M. Santillan Sr.	Elected Mayor
1957–1960	Jose S. Yabut Sr.	Elected Mayor
1960	Felicisimo Pamandanan	Officer-In-Charge
1961–1968	Cornelio S. Sanga	Elected Mayor
1969–1975	Lamberto Punsalan	Elected Mayor
1976–1979	Ruben Dagdag	Assumed the post being Vice Mayor at the time. (Mayor Punsalan was killed)
1980–1986	Jose Yabut Jr.	Elected Mayor
1986–1988	Gaudencio Pineda	Appointed Mayor
1988–1998	Manuel S .Bondoc	Elected Mayor
1998–2001	Azor L. Sitchon	Elected Mayor
2001–2010	Rodrigo Miranda Canlas	Elected Mayor
2010–2019	Leonora Capule Wong	Elected Mayor
2019–2025	Abundio Punsalan Jr.	Elected Mayor
2025-present	Anne Canlas	Acting Mayor

== Education ==
The San Simon Schools District Office governs all educational institutions within the municipality. It oversees the management and operations of all private and public, from primary to secondary schools.

=== Primary and elementary schools ===
- Dela Paz Elementary School
- San Agustin Elementary School
- San Isidro Elementary School
- San Jose Elementary School
- San Juan Elementary School
- San Miguel Elementary School
- San Nicolas Elementary School
- San Pablo Elementary School
- San Pedro Elementary School
- San Simon Elementary School
- Sta. Cruz Elementary School
- Sta. Monica Elementary School
- Sto. Nino Elementary School
- The Covenant United Methodist Church Child Development Center
- The United Methodist Church Ecumenical Kiddie Mission School

=== Secondary schools ===
- Assumpta Technical High School
- Concepcion Integrated School
- Dela Paz Libutad High School
- Pampanga Central High School
- San Pedro National High School
- San Simon High School
- Sta. Monica High School

=== Higher educational institution ===
- Next Generation Technological College
- St. Augustine Institute of Pampanga

== Telecommunications ==
The town is served by PLDT, PilTel, DatelCom, Smart, Globe, Dito and with new copper line Converge ICT.

== Gallery ==
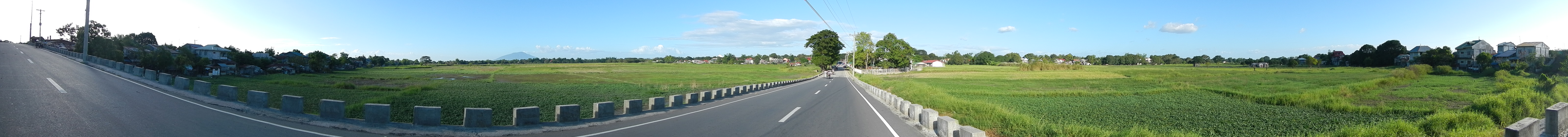
Panorama of the rice fields and roads
