= Apalit =

Municipality in Pampanga, Philippines

- Municipality
- Municipality of Apalit
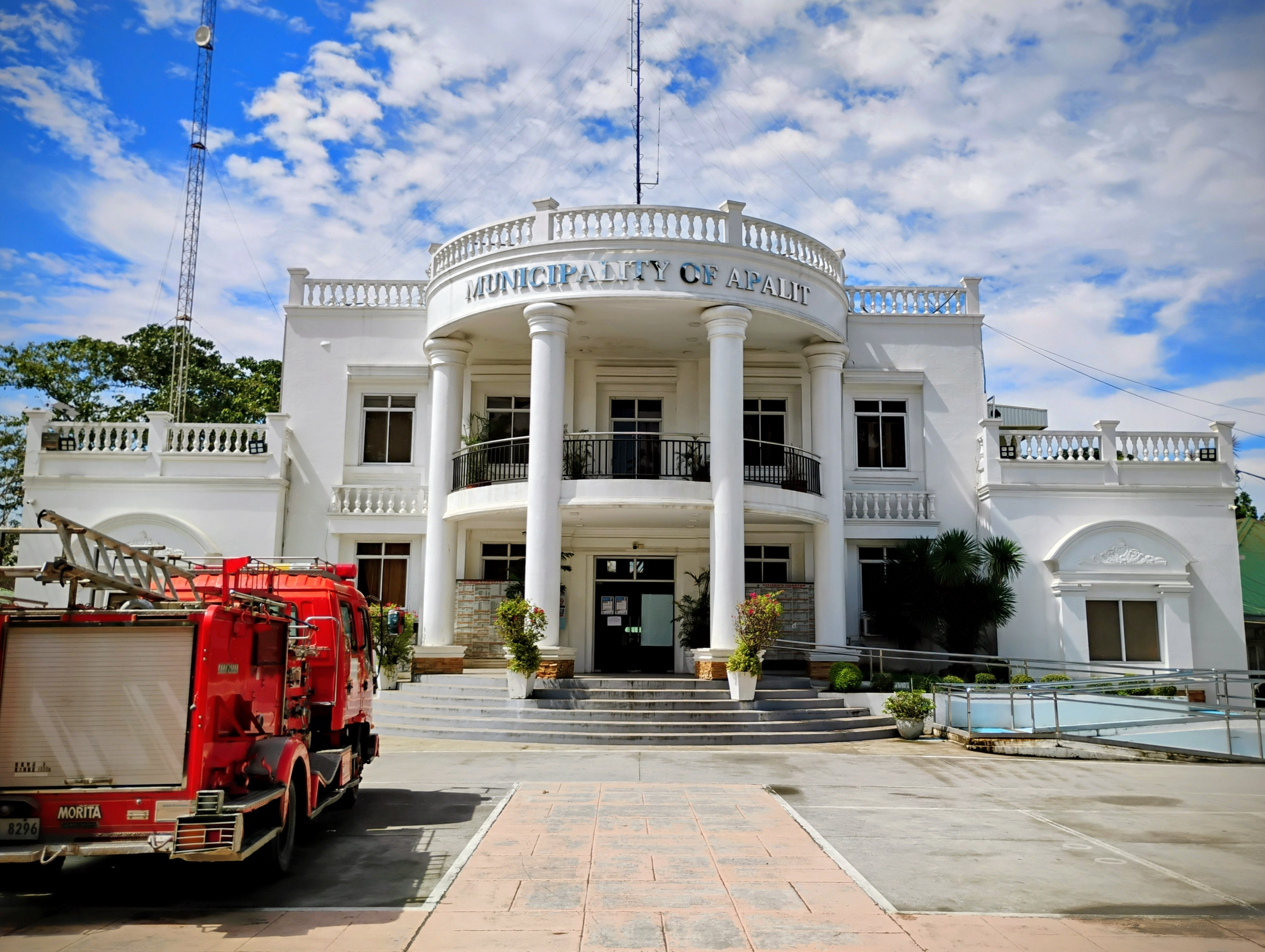
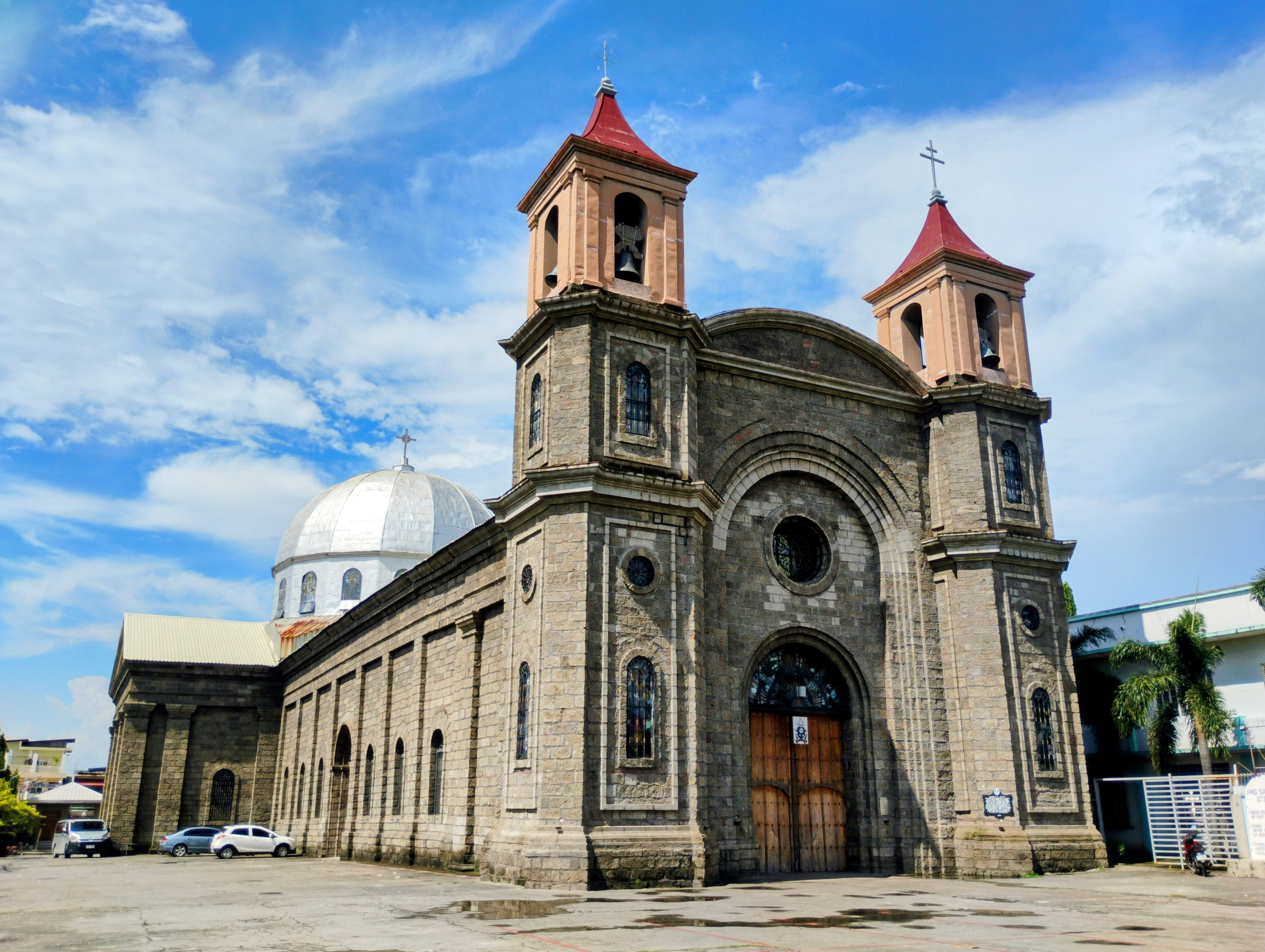
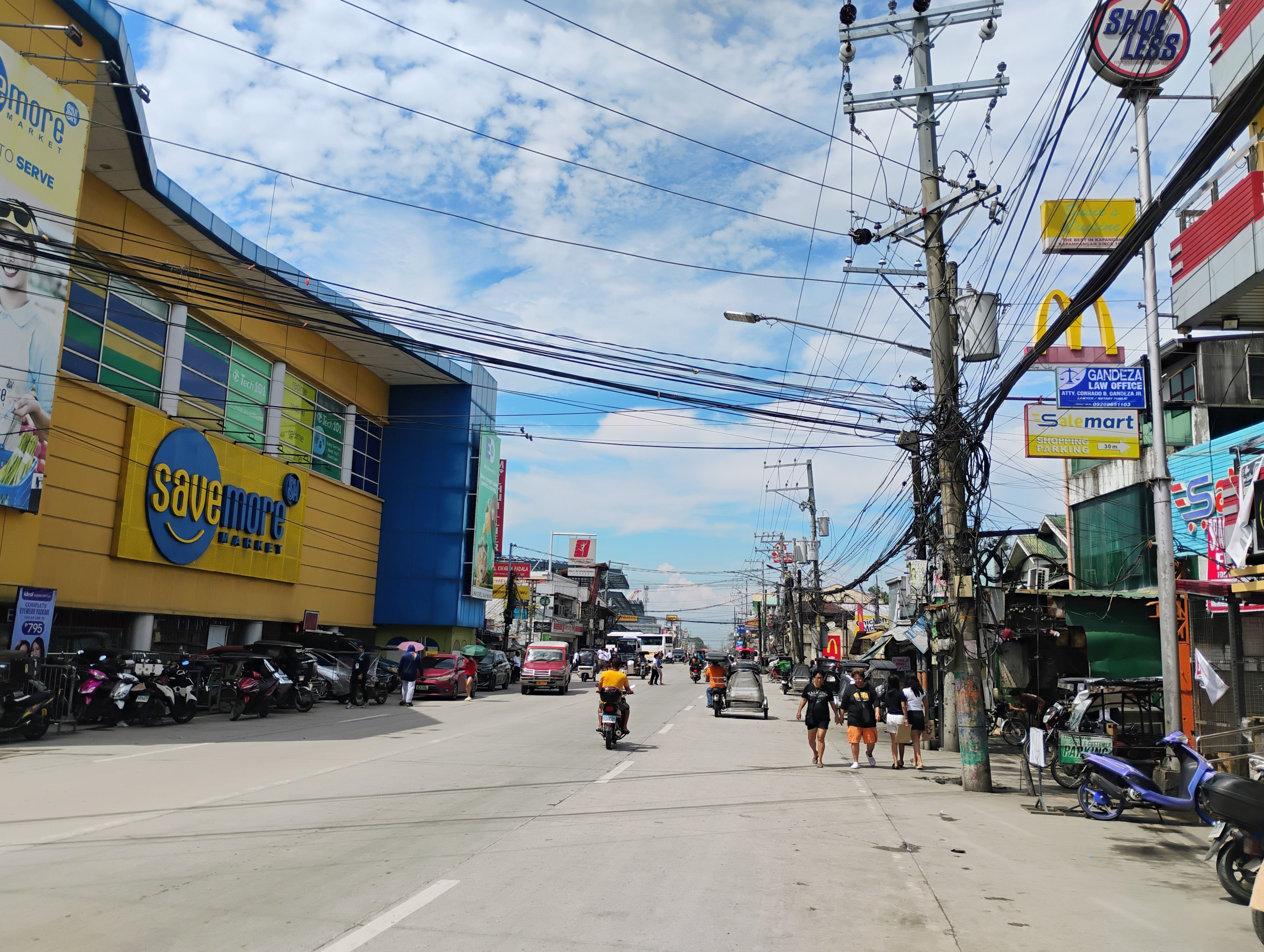
- Apalit Municipal Hall San Pedro Apostol Parish Church MacArthur Highway along Apalit

- Seal
- Mottoes: Pampanga's Gateway to Manila; The Blacksmith Capital of Pampanga
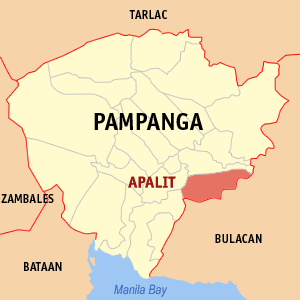
- Map of Pampanga with Apalit highlighted
- Interactive map of Apalit
- Location within the Philippines
- Coordinates: 14°56′58″N 120°45′31″E
- Country: Philippines
- Region: Central Luzon
- Province: Pampanga
- District: 4th district
- Barangays: 12 (see Barangays)

Government
  - Type: Sangguniang Bayan
  - Mayor: Oscar D. Tetangco Jr.
  - Vice Mayor: Pedro C. Nucom
  - Representative: Anna York P. Bondoc
  - Municipal Council: Members: Allen M. Dungo; Maria Victoria M. Mendoza; Mary Cris G. Manlapaz; Archie H. Manlapaz; Jesus G. Torres; Marilou O. Nabong; Pablo E. Nabong; Luis Melito S. Vargas
  - Electorate: 65,650 voters (2025)

Area
  - Total: 61.47 km^{2} (23.73 sq mi)
- Elevation: 7.0 m (23.0 ft)
- Highest elevation: 35 m (115 ft)
- Lowest elevation: −2 m (−6.6 ft)

Population (2024 census)
  - Total: 121,057
  - Density: 1,969/km^{2} (5,101/sq mi)
  - Households: 27,391

Economy
  - Income class: 1st municipal income class
  - Poverty incidence: 8.09% (2023)
  - Revenue: ₱ 469.1 million (2024)
  - Assets: ₱ 564.1 million (2024)
  - Expenditure: ₱ 451.5 million (2024)
  - Liabilities: ₱ 192.2 million (2024)

Service provider
  - Electricity: Pampanga 3 Electric Cooperative (PELCO 2)
- Time zone: UTC+8 (PST)
- ZIP code: 2016
- PSGC: 0305402000
- IDD : area code: +63 (0)45
- Native languages: Kapampangan; Tagalog

Apalit, officially the Municipality of Apalit (Kapampangan: Balen ning Apalit; Tagalog: Bayan ng Apalit), is a municipality in the province of Pampanga, Philippines. According to the 2024 census, it has a population of 121,057 people.

The town is famous for its Apung Iru Fluvial Procession, which is listed as one of the most significant water-based intangible cultural heritage of the Philippines where the festival takes place every June 28–30; and for its blacksmithing.

== Etymology ==
The town got its name after a big sturdy tree with the scientific name Pterocarpus indicus also known as Narra and sandalwood which are class of woods from trees in the Santalum genus, known by Kapampangan as Apalit.

== History ==
Apalit received official recognition as a separate town in 1582, while Gonzalo Ronquillo de Penalosa was the country's governor-general at the time. Apalit's town was mostly made up of four encomiendas: Apali (Pale), La Castilla, Cabambangan, and Capalangan. San Juan Nepomuceno was the new name given to the enconmienda "La Castilla" once it had been transformed into a town proper (Poblacion).

After severing ties with the Parish of Calumpit, The Apalit Parish of Saint Peter was established in 1597.

Capitan del Pueblo Don Pedro Armayan-Espiritu y Macam created the customary fluvial parade of Saint Peter on June 28, 1844, commonly known as "Libad ng Apung Iru," which is still observed today in Apalit during its town festival.

It is thought that the son of a specific Gatbonton named Pangpalung, who was once known as Macapagal, built Barrio Capalangan, which takes its name from the Kapampangan word "Palang" meaning machete or bolo, which the barangay takes pride of.

This Barrio was the home of Panday Pira, the first well-known Filipino maker of cannons, and got its name from the Kapampangan word "Palang," which means Bolo or Machete. It is said to have been founded by the son of a particular Gatbonton named Pangpalung, who in his youth also went by the name "Macapagal." After the Spanish conquest of Manila, he worked under Adelantado and Governor General Miguel Lopez de Legaspi, producing "Lantakas" cannons for Rajah Soliman's army.

During the reign of Capitan del Pueblo Don Joaquin Arnedo de la Cruz y Tanjutco and his heiress wife, Dona Maria de la Paz Sioco y Carlos, viuda de Tanjutco, Puerto Sulipan was once regarded as a haven for big businesses, politics, and "high society" in the Philippines from the 1850s until the 1910s.

== Geography ==
Apalit is surrounded by Macabebe, Masantol, Minalin and San Simon in Pampanga, and Calumpit, Pulilan, and Baliuag in Bulacan.

It is 55 kilometres (34 mi) from Manila, 11 kilometres (6.8 mi) from the provincial capital, San Fernando, and 28 kilometres (17 mi) from Angeles.

=== Barangays ===
Apalit is politically subdivided into 12 barangays, as shown below. Each barangay consists of puroks and some have sitios.

- Balucuc (Nuestra Señora de la Divina Pastora)
- Calantipe (Santo Niño)
- Cansinala (Nuestra Señora del Rosario)
- Capalangan (Holy Cross)
- Colgante (Holy Family)
- Paligui (Chair of St. Peter / Apung Iru)
- Sampaloc (San Roque)
- San Juan (San Juan Nepomuceno) (Poblacion)
- San Vicente (San Vicente Ferrer) (Business District)
- Sucad (Santa Lucia)
- Sulipan (Christ the Eternal High Priest)
- Tabuyuc (Santo Rosario)

=== Climate ===
Climate data for Apalit, Pampanga
Month	Jan	Feb	Mar	Apr	May	Jun	Jul	Aug	Sep	Oct	Nov	Dec	Year
Mean daily maximum °C (°F)	28 (82)	29 (84)	31 (88)	33 (91)	32 (90)	31 (88)	30 (86)	29 (84)	29 (84)	30 (86)	30 (86)	28 (82)	30 (86)
Mean daily minimum °C (°F)	20 (68)	20 (68)	21 (70)	23 (73)	24 (75)	24 (75)	24 (75)	24 (75)	24 (75)	23 (73)	22 (72)	21 (70)	23 (72)
Average precipitation mm (inches)	6 (0.2)	4 (0.2)	6 (0.2)	17 (0.7)	82 (3.2)	122 (4.8)	151 (5.9)	123 (4.8)	124 (4.9)	99 (3.9)	37 (1.5)	21 (0.8)	792 (31.1)
Average rainy days	3.3	2.5	3.6	6.6	17.7	22.2	25.2	23.7	23.2	17.9	9.2	5.2	160.3
Source: Meteoblue (Use with caution: this is modeled/calculated data, not measured locally.)

== Demographics ==
Population census of Apalit
Year	Pop.	±% p.a.
1903	12,206	—
1918	11,880	−0.18%
1939	14,330	+0.90%
1948	14,576	+0.19%
1960	25,408	+4.74%
1970	36,138	+3.58%
1975	41,283	+2.71%
1980	48,253	+3.17%
1990	62,373	+2.60%
1995	65,720	+0.98%
2000	78,295	+3.82%
2007	97,296	+3.04%
2010	101,537	+1.56%
2015	107,965	+1.18%
2020	117,160	+1.74%
2024	121,057	+0.79%
Source: Philippine Statistics Authority

In the 2024 census, the population of Apalit was 121,057 people, with a density of 2,000 inhabitants per square kilometre or 5,200 inhabitants per square mile.

=== Religion ===
Most inhabitants of Apalit are Christian, with a majority professing Catholicism, due to Spanish colonialism and imperialism from the 15th to 19th centuries. Other prominent Christian groups include Members Church of God International, Iglesia ni Cristo, and Muslims.

==== Catholicism ====
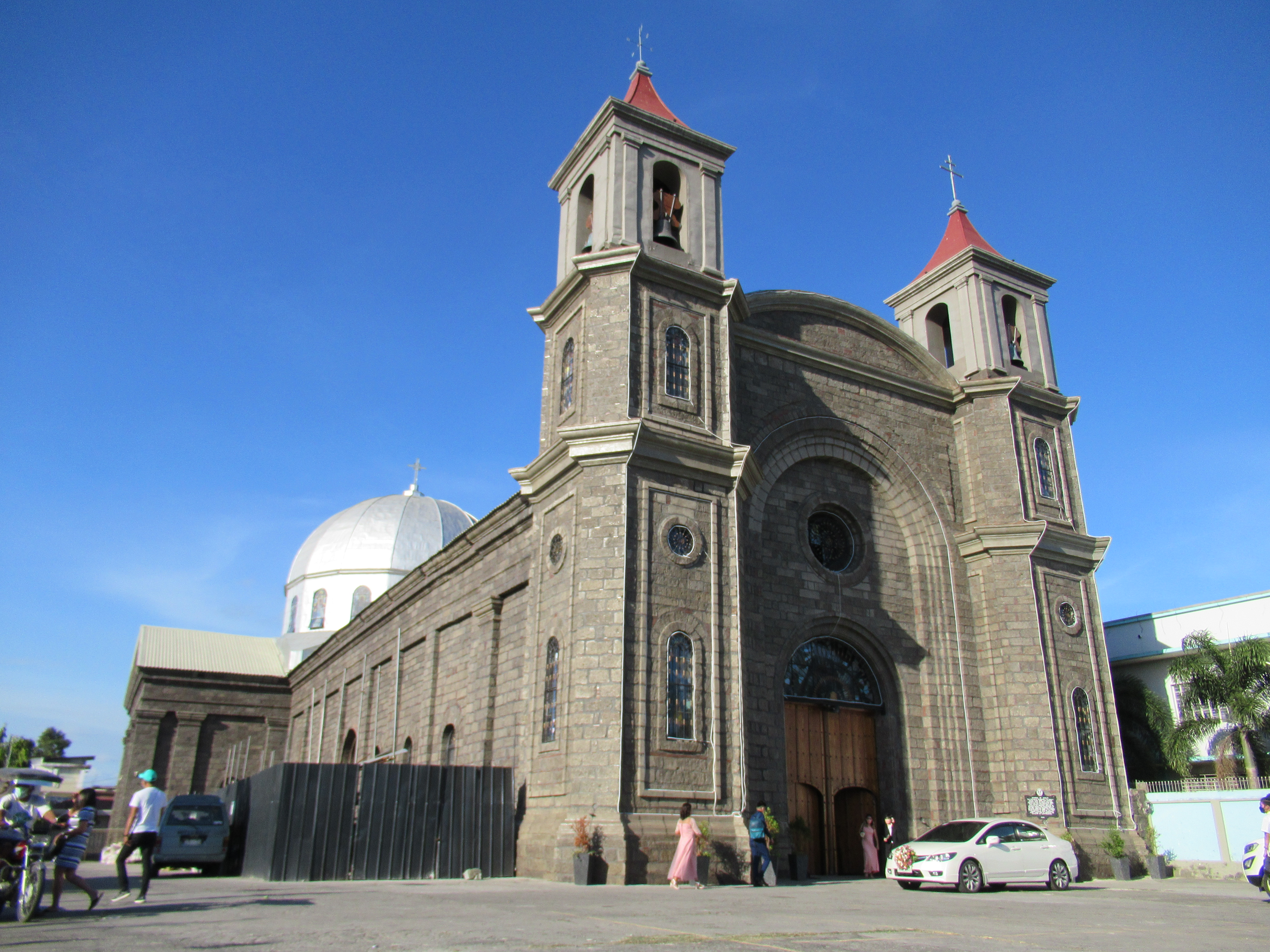
1590 San Pedro Apostol Parish, San Juan, Roman Catholic Archdiocese of San Fernando.

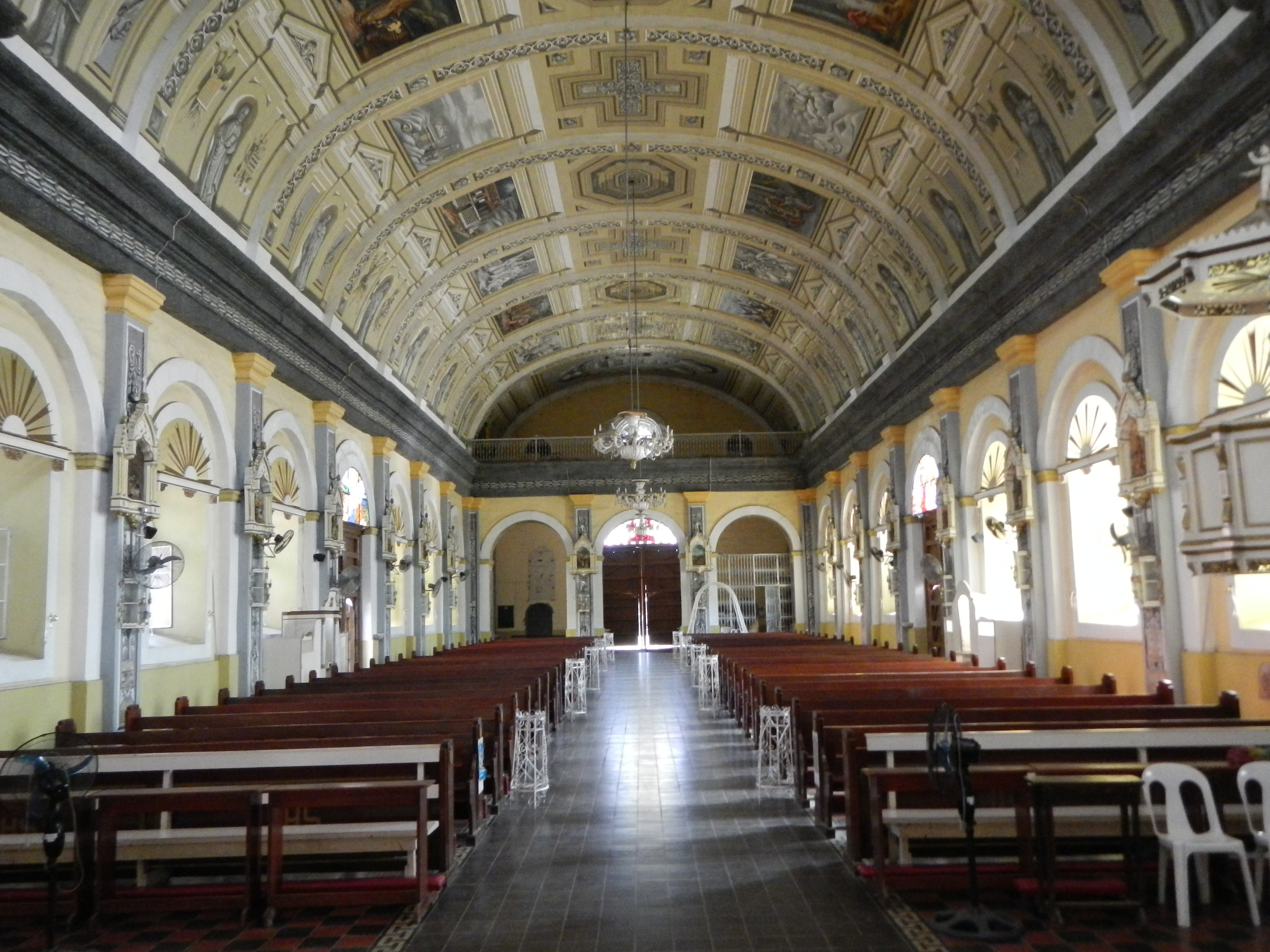
Interior

Apalit was first established as one of the visitas (mission chapel) under the administration of Convento de Calumpit. In 1597, the Augustinian chapter accepted Apalit as House of Order under the advocacy of San Pedro Apostol where Fray Pedro de Vergara OSA as its first parish priest In conjunction with the annual town fiesta, the Libad was established by the Capitan del Pueblo, Don Pedro Armayan-Espíritu y Macam, on June 28, 1844.Libad fluvial procession also reaching Calumpit even today to signify the old relationship of Apalit to its mother town Calumpit where San Juan Bautista is the patron of the Town.

The first church and convento was constructed under the tenure of Fray Juan Cabello as parish priest from 1641 to 1645. Fray Simón de Alarcia built another church made of concrete and tile in 1854–1860, but it was destroyed by a strong earthquake in 1863. The present neo-classical church was built under Fray Antonio Redondo, who was assigned to Apalit from 1873 to 1886.

Father Gallende wrote in La Iglesia de Apalit:

"Father Antonio Redondo, parish priest of Apalit from 1873 to 1886 laid the foundations of a new one in January 1876, following the plans of Don Ramón Hermosa, assistant officer to the minister of public works. The foreman was a certain Mariano Santos, a native of Guagua. After seven years of work, the church was finally completed in 1883. It was "the pride of Pampanga, an indelible tribute to Fr. Redondo and the people of Apalit.'"

It was officially inaugurated with solemn ceremonies held successively during the town fiesta from 28 to 30 June of the same year. The chronicler remarks that when there was no more sand or bricks, Fr. Redondo would ask the fiscal (sacristan) to go around town pealing the bells. Preceded by the town bands, he would lead the way towards the riverside with an azafate (a basket or hamper) on his head. Unquestioning, the whole town would follow him, and in less than two hours, the masons would have enough sand for two months. "The whole town of Apalit helped either with monetary donations, personal service, or with their good wishes." The church measures 59 meters long and 14 meters wide. The painting was done by a native of Apalit, an industrious pupil of Alberoni. The church possesses the qualities of good construction: "solidity, capacity, light and artistic beauty."

The towers were completed under the guidance of Rev Toríbio Fanjul in 1896. In 1989, a major church renovation was initiated by Monsignor Rústico G. Cuevas.

===== Feast of Saint Peter =====
The Libad, a fluvial procession in honour of the town's patron saint Peter the Apostle (known locally Apung Iru), is annually from 28 to 30 June. The event, where a centuries-old ivory image of the apostle is paraded along the Pampanga River, is one of the more famous religious processions in Pampanga.

===== History of the Image of Apung Iru =====
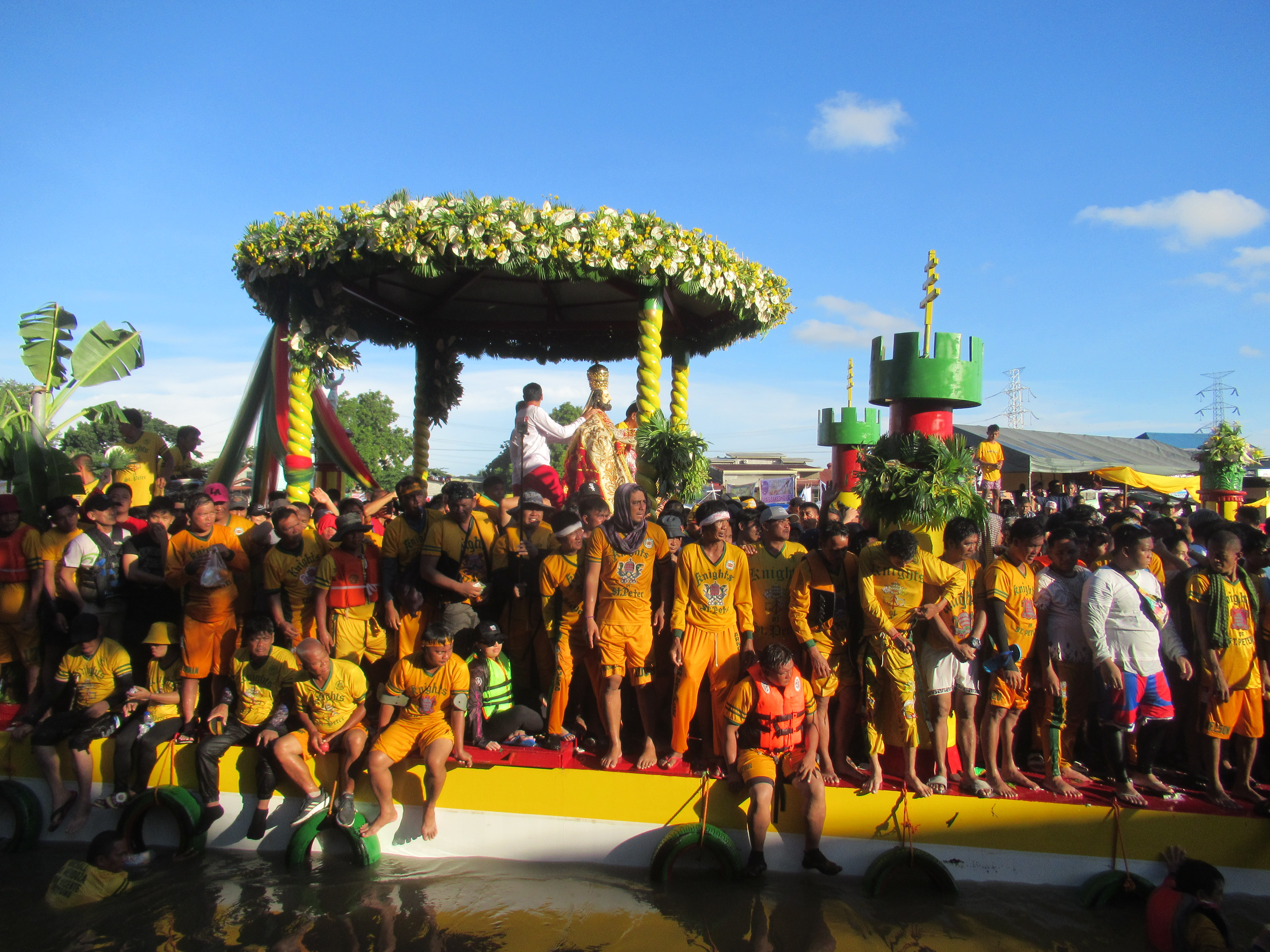
178th year "Libad" (Apung Iru Festival - 426th Apalit Town Fiesta) with seated 1700s image of "Apung Iru"

The life-sized, seated image of "Apung Iru" is an heirloom of the Armayan-Espíritu y Macam clan of Sitio Alauli, San Vicente, Apalit. The image, with its ivory face and hands, dates from the last quarter of the 1700s. Family tradition has it that Don Pedro Armayan-Espíritu y Macam (d. 1904)–or his parents Don Calixto Armayan-Espíritu and Doña María Macam, acquired the image from an aunt, Doña Máxima Santos–in exchange for a considerable parcel of agricultural land in Apalit. During the Spanish colonial era, Spanish friars shrewdly assigned the ownership of the town's patron saint to wealthy families, so that the former could be spared the expenses of its upkeep and annual fiesta. The first Libad was held in 1844.

Custody of the image of Apung Iru has passed to the direct descendants of Don Pedro Armayan-Espíritu y Macam, who married three times: first to Doña Dorotea Arnedo; then Máxima Santa Rita; and finally Ysabel Dungo y Nocom. Don Pedro originally bequeathed the image to his favourite, his youngest daughter Doña Ysidora "Orang" Espíritu y Dungo (later Mrs. Jesús Justo González), but she did not want the responsibility of being the image's camarera (custodian). She passed it on to her elder, spinster sister Doña Aurea "Ondeng" Espíritu y Dungo. After Doña Aurea's early death, Don Pedro's eldest daughter Doña María "Maruja" Espíritu y Dungo (later Mrs. Macario Arnedo) became the image's camarera. In 1928, Doña María translated the image of Apung Iru from the Armayan-Espíritu ancestral home in Sitio Alauli in Barangay San Vicente to her house in Barrio Capalangan, where it has remained since.

Doña María died in 1934, and her second daughter Doña Ysabel "Tabing" Arnedo y Espíritu (later Mrs .Fernando Dueñas Reyes) became the image's "camarera" until her own death in 1970. Doña María's third daughter, Doña Rosario Lucia "Charing" Arnedo y Espíritu (later Mrs. Augusto Diosdado Sioco González) became camarera until her death in May 1977. The youngest daughter, Doña Elisa Juana "Ising" Arnedo y Espíritu (later Mrs Fortunato Kabiling Sazon) became the next camarera until her death in May 1987. Doña Elisa's eldest daughter, Dr. Erlinda Crispina "Linda" Arnedo Sazon (later Mrs. Enrique Espíritu Badenhop) succeeded her mother as camarera from until her own death in February 2008. Augusto Marcelino "Toto" Reyes González III, Doña Rosario's grandson from her eldest son, Augusto Beda, is the current camarero of Apung Iru, following a stipulation that Doña Rosario and Doña Ysidora made to the family in 1970.

In 1975, Doña Ysidora, Doña Rosario, and the latter's son Brother Andrew Benjamin González, F.S.C., established Saint Peter's Mission, Inc. with the stipulation that Apung Iru and his feast be maintained by the generations to come.

=== Prominent Families of Apalit ===
Apalit is home to several prominent families whose wealth and influence date back to the 1800s and 1900s. These families have played significant roles in the town's history, culture, and development. The following are some of the notable families from Apalit:

- Familia Arnedo
  - The Arnedo family is one of the most prominent and influential families in Apalit. Their lineage can be traced back to the Spanish colonial period. They were known for their vast agricultural lands and involvement in local politics. Pedro "Don Perico" Arnedo, one of the most notable members, served as a governor of Pampanga in the early 20th century. The Arnedo family's wealth and status have made them a central figure in Apalit's social and economic landscape.
- Familia Santos
  - The Santos family is another old-money family from Apalit, known for their extensive landholdings and contributions to local commerce. They were prominent in the agricultural sector, particularly in rice and sugarcane farming, which were the primary industries in Pampanga during the 19th and early 20th centuries. Members of the Santos family have also been active in local politics and civic activities, further cementing their influence in the community.
- Familia Espiritu
  - The Espiritu family, known for their significant land ownership and business ventures, have been influential in Apalit for generations. They were among the pioneering families who invested in various enterprises, including milling and trading. The family's social standing and economic contributions have played a crucial role in the development of Apalit over the years.
- Familia Ocampo
  - The Ocampo family is recognized for their historical significance and long-standing presence in Apalit. They were key players in the agricultural industry, owning vast tracts of farmland. Over the years, the Ocampo family diversified their interests into other businesses, maintaining their wealth and influence in the region. Their legacy includes contributions to local culture and education.
- Familia David
  - The David family, with roots tracing back to the Spanish era, has been a prominent name in Apalit. Known for their involvement in agriculture and local governance, they have held various influential positions over the decades. The family's wealth was primarily derived from their extensive agricultural properties and entrepreneurial activities. Members of the David family have also been known for their philanthropic efforts, supporting community projects and educational initiatives.
- Familia Guanzon
  - The Guanzon family is another notable old-money family from Apalit. They were significant landowners and were involved in various commercial activities, including trading and milling. The family's economic contributions and social status have made them an integral part of Apalit's history. Over time, the Guanzon family has remained influential in local affairs and business.
- Familia Macapagal
  - The Macapagal family, which has its roots in Apalit, is one of the most distinguished families in the Philippines. They rose to national prominence with Diosdado Macapagal, who served as the President of the Philippines from 1961 to 1965. The family's origins in Apalit are marked by their involvement in agriculture and local leadership. Their legacy includes not only political achievements but also contributions to the social and economic fabric of Apalit.

== Economy ==
Poverty incidence of Apalit (%)

Source: Philippine Statistics Authority

== Government ==
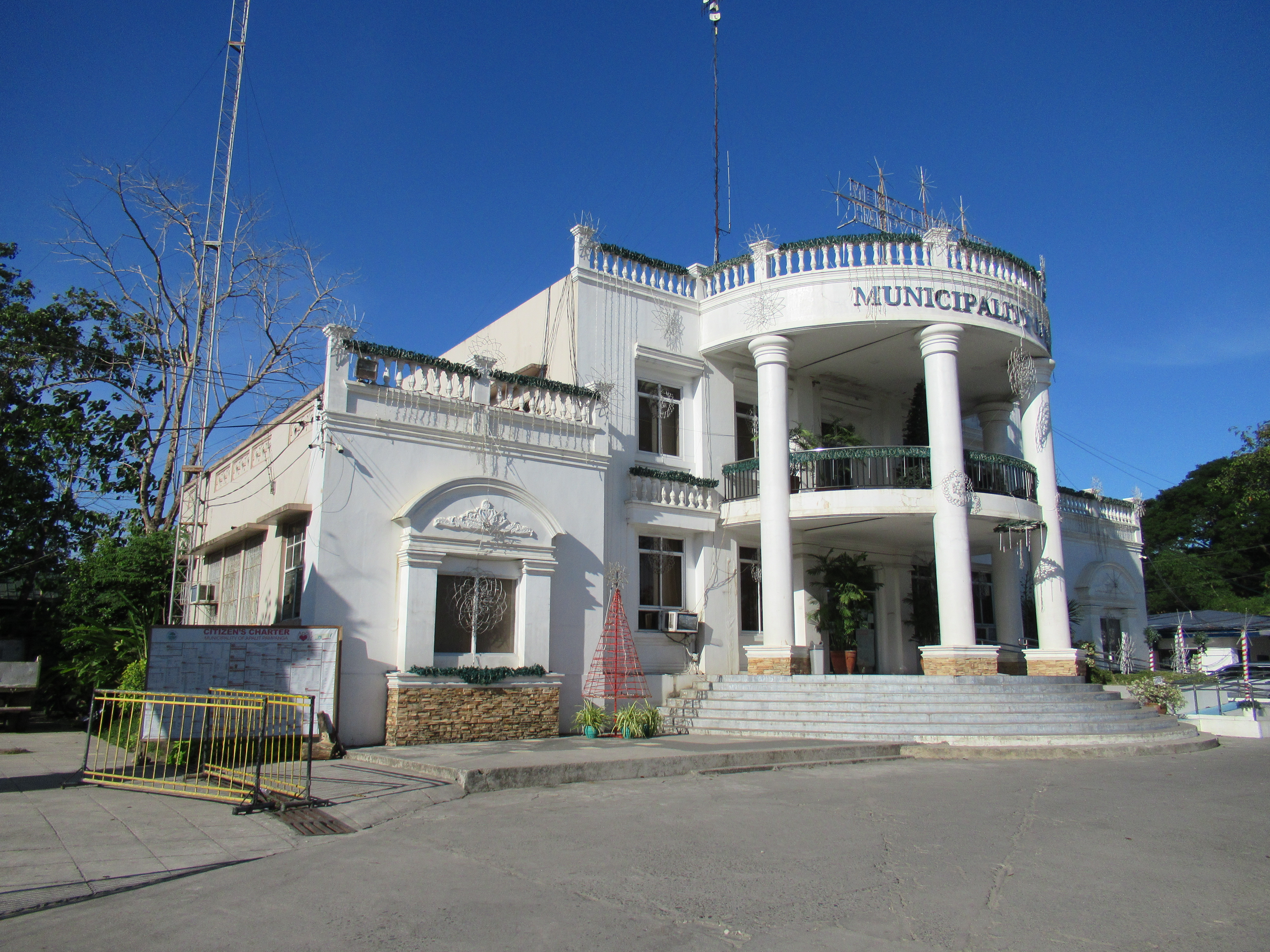
Facade of Town Hall

Like other towns in the Philippines, Apalit is governed by a mayor and vice mayor who are elected to three-year terms. The mayor is the executive head and leads the town's departments in executing the ordinances and improving public services. The vice mayor heads the legislative council (Sangguniang Bayan) consisting of councilors from the Barangays or Barrios. Of the eight councilors, only one won independently, while the rest came from KMBLN.

=== Elected officials ===
Municipal council (2022-2025):

- Mayor: Oscar "Jun" Dizon Tetangco Jr.
- Vice Mayor: Pedro C. Nucom
- Councilors:
  - Hon. Andrew Hipolito Manlapaz
  - Hon. Maria Victoria "Mavic" Mendoza
  - Hon. Marilou "Malou" Nabong
  - Hon. Jedalyn "Jed" Dalusung
  - Hon. Pablo "Pol" Enriquez Nabong
  - Hon. Elias "Doc" Mendoza
  - Hon. Kenneth Tiglao Nunag
  - Hon. Edmon "Tuks" Simon

=== List of local chief executives ===
Year	Name
1713	Juan Cudia
1714	Francisco Canda
1715	José Samonte
1716	Lucas Catu
1717	Baltazar Catu
1718	Santiago Vergara
1719	Esteban Ramos
1720	Nicolas Tupay
1721	Lucas Pungsalang
1722	Jacinto Tria
1723	Juan Capulong
1724	Diego Mercado
1725	Pedro Pungsalang
1726	Francisco Simbulan
1727	Juan Mancani
1728	Juan Patio
1729	Miguel Binuya
1730	Cristobal Maggalas
1731	Agustín de la Cruz
1732	Juan Cudia
1733	Lucas Catu
1734	Agustín de la Cruz
1735	Juan Cudia
1736	Pedro Cortez
1737	Gregorio Nocum
1738	Diosdado Pungsalang
1739	Pedro Cortez
1740	José Arceo
1741	Bernabe Nocum
1742	Diosdado Pungsalang
1743	Pedro Pangan
1744	Lorenzo Mananquil
1745	Agustin Torres
1746	Adriano Lumba
1747	Marcos Cudia
1748	Dionisio Pangan
1749	Pedro Catu
1750	Alfonso Patiang
1751	Agustín Gamboa
1752	Marcos Cabrera
1753	José Payabyab
1754	Pedro Yumul
1755	Nicolas Tolentino
1756	Nicolas Pungsalang
1757	Lorenzo Mananquil
1758	Gerónimo Padilla
1759	Tibúrcio Padilla
1760	Pablo Binuya
1761	Juan Bautista de Tabora
1762	Nicolas Ventura
1763	José Umali Centeno
1764	Bonifacio Pungsalang
1765	Pedro Arceo
1766	José Mariano
1767	Felipe Zaplala
1768	Agustín Soliman
1769	José Binuya
1770	Marcos Mananquil
1771	Nicolas Ventura
1772	Simón de Torres
1773	Agustín Gutierrez
1774	Felipe Cuyugan
1775	Pablo Dungca
1776	Francisco Pangan
1777	Estanislao Pagpayo
1778	Matias Bolus

Year	Name
1779	Blashite Balagtas
1780	Fausto Binuya
1781	Leonardo Mamangun
1782	Gregorio Alejo
1783	Lucas Pungsalang
1784	Pedro Joaquin
1785	Pablo Binuya
1786	Bernabe de la Cruz
1787	Pedro Cabrera
1788	Domingo Dungca
1789	Alejo Pangan
1790	Martín Carlos Padilla
1791	Juan Manlapaz
1792	Francisco Binuya
1793	Pablo Zaplala
1794	Diego Mercado
1795	Francisco Binuya
1796	Tomás Lacandula
1797	Nicolas Bautista
1798	Alejandro Gutierrez
1799	Fernando Gutierrez
1800	Feliciano Mananquil
1801	Juan Arcilla
1802	Vicente Cabrera
1803	Pablo Torres
1804	Vicente Atienza
1805	Vicente Ponca
1806	Agustín Cabrera
1807	Juan Serrano
1808	Domingo Ponce
1809	Pablo Mercada
1810	Marcelo Nabal
1811	Victorio Sarmiento
1812	Pantaleón Atienza
1813	Jacinto Pangan
1814	Pedro Mercado
1815	Marcelo Nabal
1816	Mariano Pangan
1817	Anastacio Pablo Yabut
1818	Isidro Ponce
1819	Pablo Mercado
1820	Fulgencio de la Cruz
1821	Manuel Lumba
1822	Pantaleón Tenensa
1823	Felipe García Timbol
1824	Pedro Bonduc
1825	Felix Marcelo García
1826	Juan Serrano
1827	Ambrosio Pungsalang
1828	Feliciano Pangan
1829	José Sioco
1830	Juan de la Cruz
1831	Guillermo Yambao
1832	Manuel Ponce
1833	José Macapagal
1834	Juan Macalino
1835	Vicente Yumul
1836	Luis Dungca
1837	Miguel Cuyugan
1838	Pedro Cabrera
1839	Florentino de la Cruz
1840	Paulo Carlos
1841	Pedro Mamangun
1842	Pedro Balboa Enriquez
1843	Ceferino López
1844	Geronimo Yumul

Year	Name
1845	Mariano Cabrera
1846	Francisco Dungca
1847	José Esteban Yamson
1848	Cayetano Pascual
1849	Francisco Mercado
1850	Florentino Yumul
1851	Tiburcio ?
1852	Nicasio Vergara
1853	Lauriano Vergara
1854	Cayetano Dalusung
1855	Mariano Enriquez
1856	Manuel de la Cruz
1857–1858	José Sioco
1859	Joaquín de la Cruz
1860	Bernardino Dalusung
1861	Juan Arnedo Cruz
1862	Ignacio Balboa
1863–1864	Crisanto Mercado
1865–1866	Alberto Dalusung
1867–1868	Pedro Espíritu
1869–1870	Antonio García
1871–1872	José Medina
1873–1874	León Timbol
1875	Vicente Enriquez
1876–1878	Braulio Pangan
1879–1880	Francisco Vergara
1881–1882	Paulino Dalusung
1883–1884	Balbino Mercado
1885–1886	Pedro Espiritu
1887–1888	Eleuterio Pascual
1889–1890	Cayetano Dalusung
1891–1892	Francisco Pascual
1893–1894	Domingo Carlos
1895	Eleuterio Pascual
1896	Luis Espiritu
1897	Casimiro Medina
1898	Cayetano Dalusung
1899	Casimiro Medina
1900–1901	Macario Arnedo
1902–1907	Cayetano Arnedo
1908–1912	Tiburcio Mercado
1913–1916	Cayetano Arnedo
1917–1923	Vicente Cacnio
1924–1928	Ricardo Dalusung
1924	Ricardo Dalusung
1929–1930	Pablo Pungsalang
1931	Román Balagtas
1932–1934	Dionisio David
1935–1937	Cornelio Sigua
1938–1942	Patricio Tanjutco
1943	Sotero García
1944	Miguel Catacutan
1945	Patricio Tanjutco
1946	Manuel Reyes
1947	Emilio Pascual
1948–1951	Cornelio Sigua
1952–1954	Moises Catacutan
1955–1963	Alfonso Lugue
1964–1971	Honorio Mercado
1972–1980	Oscar Tetangco
1980–1986	Romeo V. Pamintuan
1986–1998	Oscar Tetangco
1998–2007	Tirso G. Lacanilao
2007–2016	Oscar Tetangco Jr.
2016–2019	Pedro C. Nucom
2019–Present	Oscar Tetangco Jr.

== Roads and bridges ==
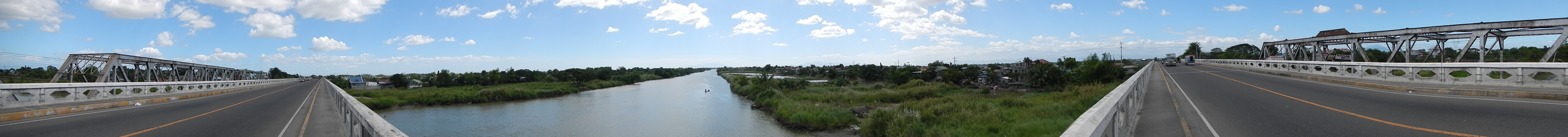
Panorama of the river and roads
- MacArthur Highway - The major road going to Apalit.
- Sulipan Bridge
- Candaba Viaduct - part of the North Luzon Expressway (NLEX), the bridge connects the provinces of Pampanga and Bulacan. Its Apalit and Pampanga portion spans from Dr. Joaquin Gonzalez Avenue to a power line wire located between lattice tower 267 and steel pole 268 of relocated San Simon–Pulilan section of Hermosa–Duhat–Balintawak Transmission Line of National Grid Corporation of the Philippines (NGCP) at an area with palm trees farther from the viaduct.
- Apalit Bypass Road
- Apalit-Macabebe-Masantol Road - going to the towns of Macabebe and Masantol
- Dr. Joaquin Gonzalez Avenue - going to municipal hall, Barangay Sucad, and St. Peter's Parish
- Macabebe-Calumpit-Apalit Road
- Sulipan-Capalangan-Tabuyuc-Cansinala Road
- Tabuyuc-Balucuc Farm to Market Road
- Arnedo Dike Road
- Sampaloc Road
- Paligui Road

== Transportation ==
The modes of transportation within Apalit, like in most urban areas in the country, is facilitated primarily by inexpensive tricycles, jeepneys, and buses. In addition, motorized boats (bancas) are used to transport goods and bring people to lower-lying areas in case of floods in other barangays.

=== Buses ===
Provincial buses, such as Victory Liner and First North Luzon Transit, pass through the MacArthur Highway and transport passengers to various key destinations. These buses connect Apalit to different parts of Bulacan, Metro Manila, and northern provinces.

=== Jeepneys ===
Various jeepney routes connect Apalit to neighboring towns in Pampanga, including Macabebe, Masantol, San Simon, Minalin, and the City of San Fernando. They also provide routes to towns in Bulacan, such as Calumpit, Malolos City, and Balagtas.

=== Tricycles ===
Tricycles are commonly used for short-distance travel within the municipality. They provide a convenient means of transportation for residents moving around local neighborhoods and barangays.

=== Van Taxis ===
Known as "FX" and "L300", van taxis operate from their terminals, offering transportation to key locations going to the province of Bulacan (Calumpit, Malolos City, and the Guiguinto Tabang Toll Plaza), going to the Metro Manila (including Monumento in Caloocan, Cubao in Quezon City, Divisoria in Manila, and Pasay), and going to other parts of the province such as Lubao, Floridablanca, Guagua, and the City of San Fernando, all the way to Olongapo City in Zambales.

== Healthcare ==
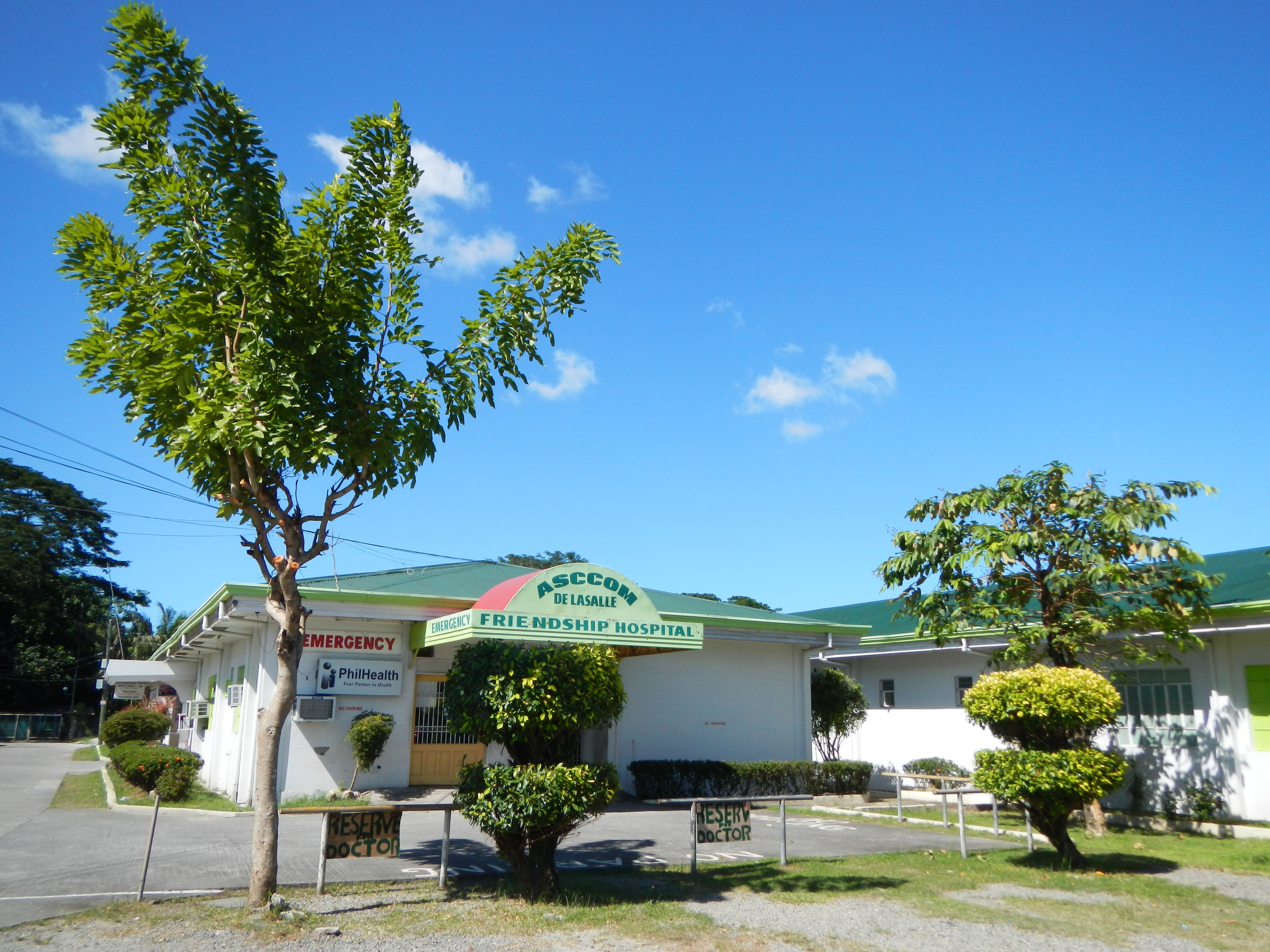
ASCCOM De La Salle Friendship Hospital

- ADD Infirmary
- Alphamed Diagnostic Laboratory
- Apalit Doctors Hospital
- ASCCOM-DLSUMC Friendship Hospital
- E.D. Lim Medical Center
- La Verdad Diagnostic Center
- Pampanga Premier Medical Center
- Perez Medical Friendly Clinic
- Medsafe Diagnostic Laboratories
- Merian Diagnostic Laboratory

== Telecommunications ==
Landline telephone systems are being provided by Datelcom and PLDT. Mobile telephony services are provided by Smart Communications, Globe Telecom and Dito Telecommunity. Internet services are provided through DSL and Cable broadband coverage is provided by PLDT, and Globe Broadband; and Wireless broadband is provided by (Smart Bro) Smart Communications. Cable Television are provided by DatelSat.

== Education ==
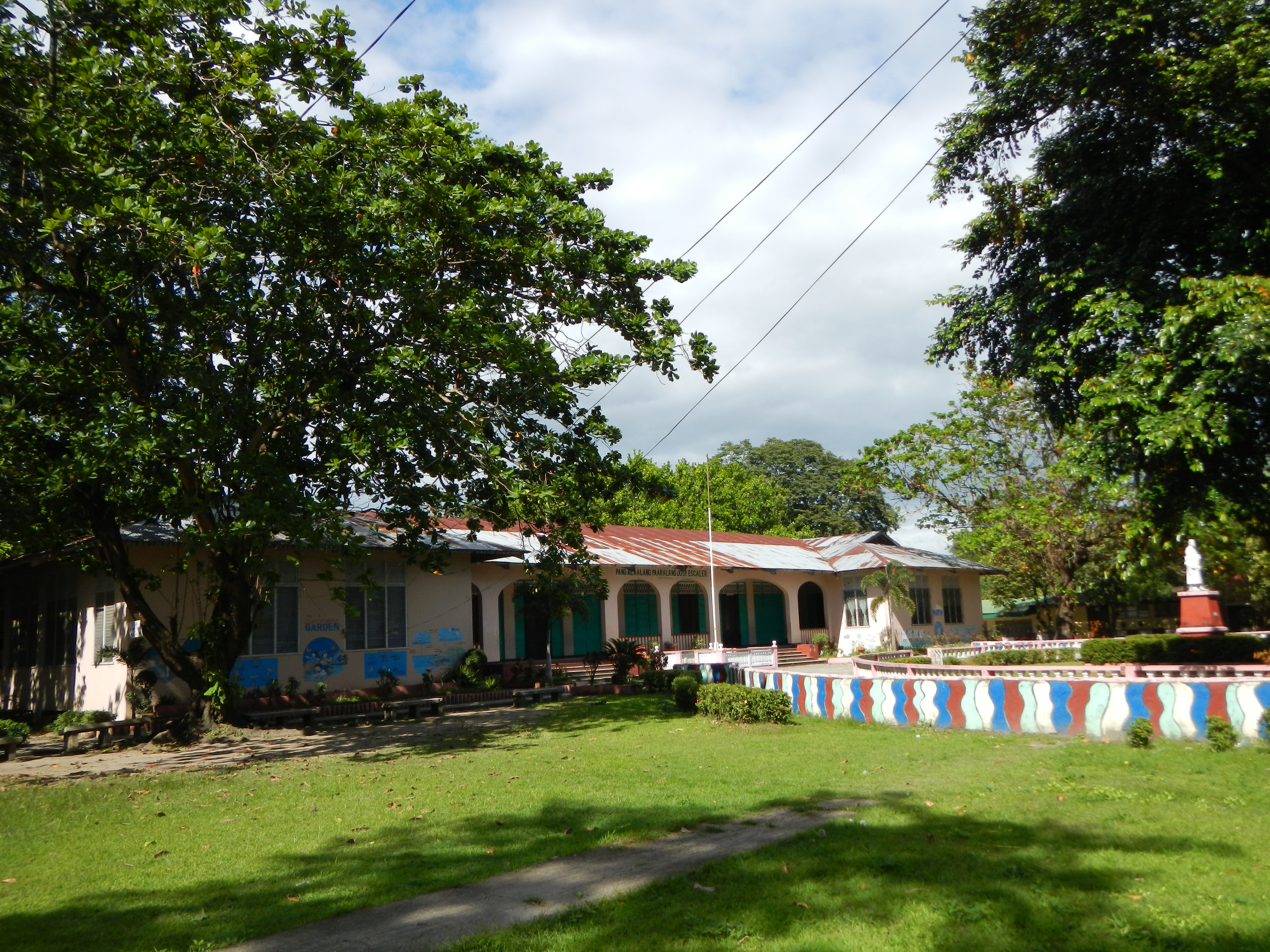
Paaralang Bayan Jose Escaler

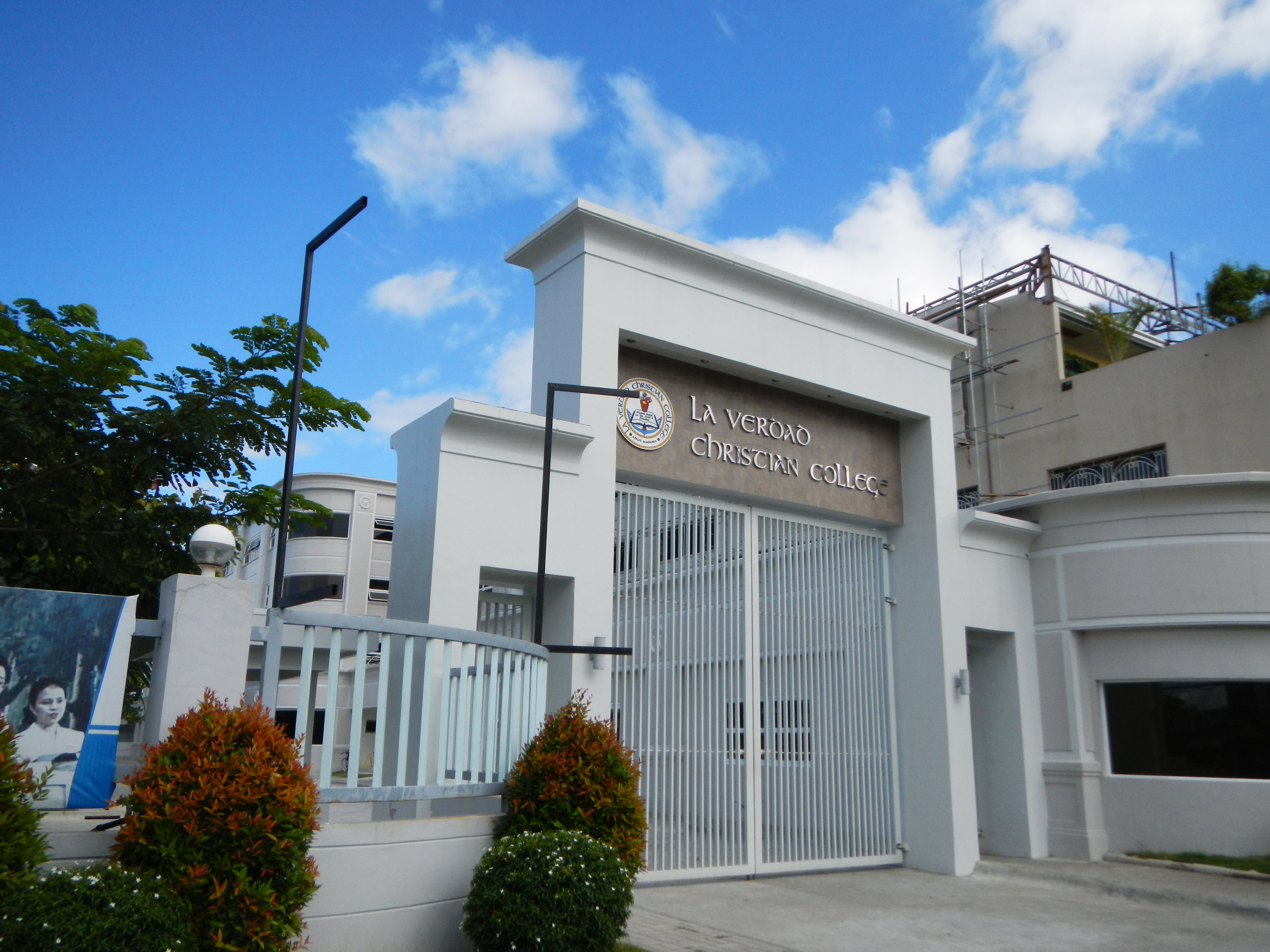
La Verdad Christian College

The Apalit Schools District Office governs all educational institutions within the municipality. It oversees the management and operations of all private and public, from primary to secondary schools.

=== Primary and elementary schools ===
- Alauli Elementary School
- Vision Academy Apalit
- Apalit Christian Ecumenical School
- Arayat Holy Child Educational Foundation
- Balucuc Elementary School
- Banag Elementary School
- Cansinala Elementary School
- Creative Haven Learning School
- Dominican School of Apalit
- Fausto Gonzales Sioco Memorial School
- Galang Memoorial Elementary School
- Holy Child Academy
- Jose Escaler Memorial Elementary School
- La Verdad Christian School (Elementary)
- Macario Arnedo Elementary School
- Maranatha Christian Academy
- Paligui Elementary School
- Sampaga Elementary School
- Sampaloc Elementary School
- San Vicente Elementary School
- St. James School
- St. Vincent's Academy
- Sto. Rosario Elementary School
- Sucad Elementary School
- Sulipan Elementary School

=== Secondary schools ===
- Apalit High School
- Balucuc High School
- Bro. Andrew Gonzalez Technological High School
- Calantipe High School
- Cansinala National High School
- La Verdad Christian School (High School)
- Sampaga High School
- Senior High School in Apalit
- Sto. Rosario National High School
- Sucad National High School

=== Higher educational institutions ===
- Asian Caregiving and Technology Education Centers
- AMA Computer Learning Center College
- Asian College of Science and Technology
- ATEC Technological College
- Pampanga State University - Apalit Campus
- Eastwoods International Institute of Science and Technology
- Gonzales Memorial College
- La Verdad Christian College

== Persona non-grata ==
- Daniel Razon through Municipal Resolution No. 28, series of 2008
