= Puyat =

Puyat is a surname. Notable people with the surname include:

- Bernadette Romulo-Puyat (born 1971), Filipino government official
- Gil Puyat (1907–1981), Filipino statesman and businessman
- Gonzalo Puyat II (1933–2013), Filipino sport administrator and politician
- Anna York Bondoc (born 1967), Filipino pulmonologist and politician
- Juan Pablo Bondoc (born 1969), Filipino politician
