= Rene Maglanque =

Filipino politician (born 1966)

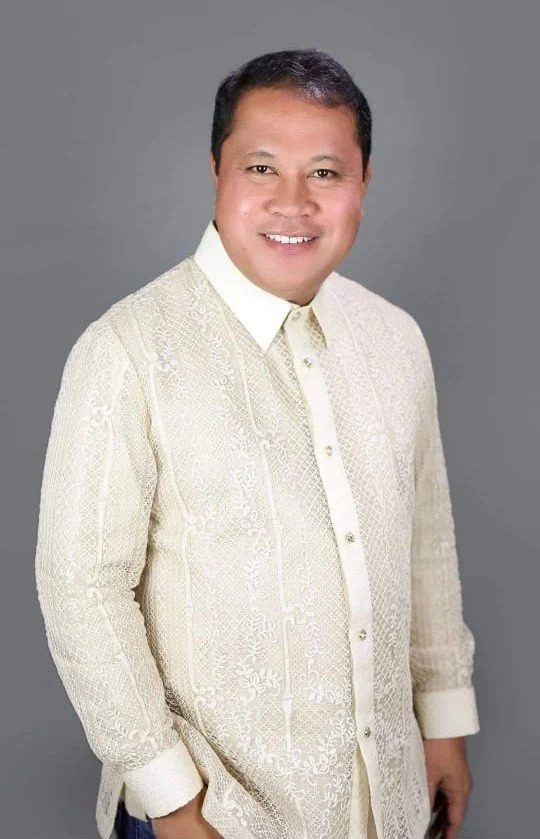
- Official portrait, 2022

Mayor of Candaba
- Incumbent
- Assumed office June 30, 2019
- Vice Mayor: Michael Sagum
- Preceded by: Danilo Baylon
- In office June 30, 2013 – June 30, 2016
- Vice mayor: Normalita Evangelista
- Preceded by: Jerry Pelayo
- Succeeded by: Danilo Baylon

Personal details
- Born: Rene Estacio Maglanque; February 11, 1966 (age 60) Candaba, Pampanga, Philippines
- Party: NPC (2007–2012; 2024–present); KAMBILAN (local party; 2021–present)
- Other political affiliations: Aksyon (2021–2024); PDP–Laban (2018–2021); Liberal (2015–2018); Independent (2012–2015)
- Spouse: Annabelle Alarcon
- Children: 3
- Parent(s): Fidencio Cunanan Maglanque; Felicisima Turla Estacio
- Profession: Politician

Rene Estacio Maglanque (born February 11, 1966) is a Filipino politician who currently served as mayor of Candaba since 2019, having previously held this post from 2013 until 2016.

On July 17, 2020, Maglanque tested positive for COVID-19. His vice mayor Michael Sagum became acting vice mayor of the municipality after he diagnosed with the disease, according to him.

== Political career ==
=== House of Representatives bids ===
In 2007, Maglanque ran as representative for 4th district of Pampanga but he lost to Anna York Bondoc.

In 2010, Maglanque ran again as representative for 4th district of Pampanga but he lost again to Anna York Bondoc.

=== Mayor of Candaba ===
In 2013 elections, Maglanque was elected and became a mayor of Candaba.

In 2016 elections, Maglanque lost to Danilo Baylon for re-election as mayor of Candaba.

In 2019 elections, Maglanque returned as mayor of Candaba after he beat Danilo Baylon over 1,146 votes.

== Controversy ==
=== Flood control anomalies ===
Senator Panfilo Lacson revealed that Macy Monique Maglanque, former president of Globalcrete Builders, was linked to ₱2.195 billion worth of flood control projects in Bulacan (2018–2024). Her father, Mayor Rene Maglanque, signed some of these contracts in 2024, even though he should have divested.

Maglanque is also president of MBB Global Properties Corporation, developer of the ₱1 billion Wyndham Garden Hotel in Clark, Pampanga. The company’s officers include Sunshine M. Bernardo (corporate secretary) and Fatima Gay B. (Bonoan) Dela Cruz (treasurer). Lacson noted that these individuals are children of Mayor Maglanque, DPWH Undersecretary Roberto Bernardo, and former DPWH Secretary Manuel Bonoan. The initials “MBB” in the company’s name stand for Maglanque, Bernardo, and Bonoan.

Lacson added that this may explain why Bonoan often defended DPWH projects, claiming isolated ghost projects in Bulacan, possibly to prevent the Globalcrete issue from being investigated further.

== Electoral history ==
Electoral history of Rene Maglanque
Year	Office	Party		Votes received				Result
Year	Office	Local	National	Total	%	P.	Swing	Result
2007	Representative (Pampanga–4th)	—N/a	NPC	47,238	—N/a	2nd	—N/a	Lost
2010	Representative (Pampanga–4th)	—N/a	NPC	85,816	38.95%	2nd	—N/a	Lost
2013	Mayor of Candaba	—N/a	Independent	13,247	28.45%	1st	—N/a	Won
2016	Mayor of Candaba	—N/a	Liberal	23,036	—N/a	2nd	—N/a	Lost
2019	Mayor of Candaba	—N/a	PDP–Laban	28,306	—N/a	1st	—N/a	Won
2022	Mayor of Candaba	KAMBILAN	Aksyon	39,194	—N/a	1st	—N/a	Won
2025	Mayor of Candaba	KAMBILAN	NPC	40,267	—N/a	1st	—N/a	Won
