= 2010 Philippine House of Representatives elections in Central Luzon =

Philippine House of Representatives elections in Central Luzon, 2010
- May 10, 2010

21 seats of Central Luzon in the House of Representatives
	First party	Second party	Third party
Party	Lakas–Kampi	Liberal	NPC
Seats won	14	2	2
Popular vote	1,990,304	686,391	500,752
Percentage	51.41%	17.73%	12.94%
	Fourth party	Fifth party	Sixth party
Party	Nacionalista	LM	LDP
Seats won	1	1	1
Popular vote	206,164	76,928	60,440
Percentage	5.33%	1.99%	1.56%
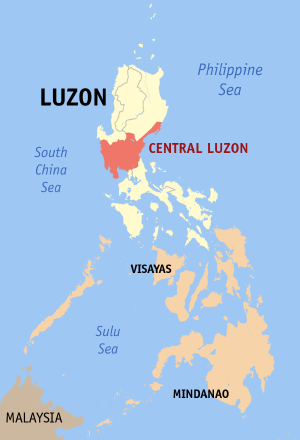
- Location of Central Luzon within the country.

Elections were held in Central Luzon for seats in the House of Representatives of the Philippines on May 10, 2010.

The candidate with the most votes won that district's seat for the 15th Congress of the Philippines.

== Summary ==
Party	Popular vote	%	Seats won
Lakas–Kampi	1,990,304	51.41%	14
Liberal	686,391	17.73%	2
NPC	500,752	12.94%	2
Nacionalista	206,164	5.33%	1
LM	76,928	1.99%	1
PDSP	71,284	1.84%	0
LDP	60,440	1.56%	1
PMP	59,714	1.54%	0
Bagumbayan	56,412	1.46%	0
PDP–Laban	14,807	0.38%	0
PGRP	12,053	0.31%	0
Bangon Pilipinas	7,150	0.18%	0
Independent	109,176	2.82%	0
Valid votes	3,871,129	93.03%	21
Invalid votes*	289,968	6.97%	
Turnout*	4,161,097	73.31%	
Registered voters	5,675,830	100.00%	

*Total invalid votes and turnout not available for 1st district of Bulacan.

== Aurora ==
Sonny Angara is the incumbent.

Candidate	Party	Votes	%
Sonny Angara (incumbent)	Laban ng Demokratikong Pilipino	60,440	80.63
Teofilo Manalo	Independent	14,521	19.37
Total		74,961	100.00
Valid votes		74,961	87.42
Invalid/blank votes		10,785	12.58
Total votes		85,746	100.00
Laban ng Demokratikong Pilipino hold			
Source: Commission on Elections

== Bataan ==
=== 1st District ===
Herminia Roman is the incumbent. At first, a minor issue erupted as to who would be the official candidate of Lakas-Kampi-CMD in the district: Roman or the governor's daughter, Maria Angela "Gila" Garcia. Based on the certificate of nomination submitted by both parties, it turned out that Governor Garcia, the provincial Lakas-Kampi chairman, nominated his daughter, while the coalition's central committee named Roman. In an en banc decision however, the Comelec later ruled that Roman is the official Lakas-Kampi-CMD candidate, making Garcia the independent one.

The result of the election is under protest in the House of Representatives Electoral Tribunal.

Candidate	Party	Votes	%
Herminia Roman (incumbent)	Lakas–Kampi–CMD	80,400	51.27
Maria Angela Garcia	Independent	76,428	48.73
Total		156,828	100.00
Valid votes		156,828	96.16
Invalid/blank votes		6,266	3.84
Total votes		163,094	100.00
Lakas–Kampi–CMD hold			
Source: Commission on Elections

=== 2nd District ===
Albert Garcia is the incumbent.

Candidate	Party	Votes	%
Albert Garcia (incumbent)	Lakas–Kampi–CMD	121,106	62.95
Maria Aurora Gonzales	Partido Demokratiko Sosyalista ng Pilipinas	71,284	37.05
Total		192,390	100.00
Valid votes		192,390	95.36
Invalid/blank votes		9,367	4.64
Total votes		201,757	100.00
Lakas–Kampi–CMD hold			
Source: Commission on Elections

== Bulacan ==
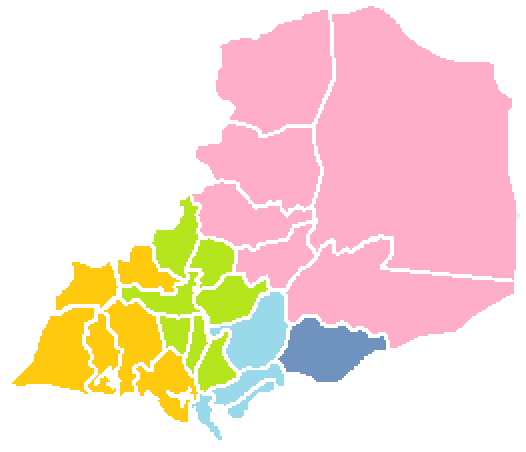
Legislative districts of Bulacan, including San Jose del Monte.

Malolos was given its own congressional seat from Bulacan's 1st district by virtue of Republic Act 9591. However, the Supreme Court ruled it unconstitutional, saying it violated Article VI Section 5 (3) of the Constitution and Section 3 of the Ordinance attached to constitution; Malolos was ruled not to have exceeded the 250,000 population for a separate legislative district.

In Bulacan, members of the same families will run against each other. Former governor Josie dela Cruz established the Del Pilar party (named after Gregorio del Pilar) as the local affiliate of the Liberal Party.

=== 1st District ===
Victoria Sy-Alvarado is the incumbent. She will face Roberto Pagdanganan.

Malolos was supposed to have its own representation in the House of Representatives, but was ruled unconstitutional by the Supreme Court for the city did not have enough population to be given separate representation. However, the decision was done after ballots were printed for Malolos and the First District. As such, the election for representative of Bulacan's 1st district would be invalid, "because the election will result in failure to elect since, in actuality, there are no candidates for the First Legislative District (with Malolos City) of Bulacan."

The date an election for representative of Bulacan's 1st district including Malolos will be decided later by the commission. The Commission scheduled the special election, along with other special elections in Basilan and Lanao del Sur, which were delayed when teachers, who were the election supervisors, refused to sit as such due to violence, on September 25. However, the Commission postponed the elections for these areas to October 2. However, due to the approval of contracts for Smartmatic-TIM, the supplier of the counting machines a few weeks prior to the special elections, the Commission decided to postpone the special elections to November 13.

On May 10, with the ballots already printed with only Pagdanganan and Sy-Alvarado contesting the seat, voters had the option of "voting" but their votes would not be counted.

Candidate	Party	Votes	%
Victoria Sy-Alvarado (incumbent)	Lakas–Kampi–CMD	118,486	71.38
Roberto Pagdanganan	Nacionalista Party	47,515	28.62
Total		166,001	100.00
Valid votes		166,001	87.19
Invalid/blank votes		24,380	12.81
Total votes		190,381	100.00
Election deferred. Special election held on November 13, 2010.			
Source: Commission on Elections

==== Special election ====
The COMELEC ruled that candidates that contested the Bulacan-1st and Malolos will contest the seat. Aniag and Domingo withdrew prior to the election, while independents Cruz and Valencia did not campaign.

Candidate	Party	Votes	%
Victoria Sy-Alvarado (incumbent)	Lakas–Kampi–CMD	95,625	68.77
Roberto Pagdanganan	Nacionalista Party	41,658	29.96
Danny Domingo (withdrew)	Liberal Party	1,032	0.74
Francisco Aniag (withdrew)	Pwersa ng Masang Pilipino	400	0.29
Tomas Valencia	Independent	271	0.19
Francisco Cruz	Independent	63	0.05
Total		139,049	100.00
Registered voters/turnout			40.73
Lakas–Kampi–CMD hold			
Source: The Philippine Star

=== 2nd District ===
Pedro Pancho is the incumbent. He will face 2007 challenger and former three-term Guiguinto, Bulacan mayor Ambrosio "Boy" Cruz Jr.

Candidate	Party	Votes	%
Pedro Pancho (incumbent)	Lakas–Kampi–CMD	145,133	53.99
Ambrosio Cruz Jr.	Liberal Party	118,489	44.07
Jaime Villafuerte	Independent	5,215	1.94
Total		268,837	100.00
Valid votes		268,837	96.06
Invalid/blank votes		11,017	3.94
Total votes		279,854	100.00
Lakas–Kampi–CMD hold			
Source: Commission on Elections

=== 3rd District ===
Incumbent Lorna Silverio is in her third consecutive term already and is ineligible for reelection. She will run for mayor of San Rafael and her husband, Ricardo Silverio, Sr. will run for her seat. His opponents are his son, Ricardo Silverio, Jr. and then incumbent governor of Bulacan, Joselito Mendoza.

The result of the election is under protest in the House of Representatives Electoral Tribunal.

Candidate	Party	Votes	%
Jonjon Mendoza	Liberal Party	121,576	55.07
Ricardo Silverio	Lakas–Kampi–CMD	92,951	42.10
Ricky Silverio	Pwersa ng Masang Pilipino	6,241	2.83
Total		220,768	100.00
Valid votes		220,768	95.14
Invalid/blank votes		11,270	4.86
Total votes		232,038	100.00
Liberal Party gain from Lakas–Kampi–CMD			
Source: Commission on Elections

=== 4th District ===
Reylina Nicholas (Lakas-Kampi-CMD) is in her third consecutive term already and is ineligible for reelection.

Candidate	Party	Votes	%
Linabelle Villarica	Liberal Party	178,643	81.01
Salvador Pleyto	Lakas–Kampi–CMD	27,072	12.28
Jovel Lopez	PDP–Laban	14,807	6.71
Total		220,522	100.00
Valid votes		220,522	90.06
Invalid/blank votes		24,337	9.94
Total votes		244,859	100.00
Liberal Party gain from Lakas–Kampi–CMD			
Source: Commission on Elections

=== Malolos ===
With the issue on Malolos' separate congressional district from Bulacan's 1st district resolved with finality, an election will be scheduled to elect the representative for Bulacan's 1st district, including Malolos."

With the ballots already printed with only the four candidates contesting the now voided seat, voters had the option of "voting" but their votes would not be counted.

Candidate	Party	Votes	%
Danny Domingo	Liberal Party	34,408	60.70
Francisco Aniag	Pwersa ng Masang Pilipino	18,488	32.61
Francisco Cruz	Independent	2,278	4.02
Tomas Valencia	Independent	1,512	2.67
Total		56,686	100.00
Valid votes		56,686	68.90
Invalid/blank votes		25,584	31.10
Total votes		82,270	100.00
Election invalidated. Special election held on November 13, 2010, under Bulacan's 1st district.			
Source: Commission on Elections

=== San Jose del Monte ===
San Jose del Monte is a component city of Bulacan. Arthur Robes is the incumbent.

Candidate	Party	Votes	%
Arthur Robes (incumbent)	Lakas–Kampi–CMD	98,888	82.11
Oscar Robes	Aksyon Demokratiko	19,554	16.24
Jesus Gonzales	Independent	1,255	1.04
Rene Avellanosa	Independent	732	0.61
Total		120,429	100.00
Valid votes		120,429	92.90
Invalid/blank votes		9,201	7.10
Total votes		129,630	100.00
Lakas–Kampi–CMD hold			
Source: Commission on Elections

== Nueva Ecija ==
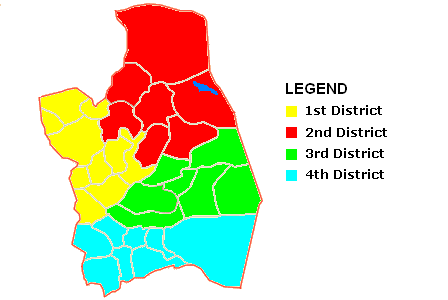
Legislative districts of Nueva Ecija.

Politics in Nueva Ecija will center on two political clans: the Josons and the Umalis. The Josons had ruled Nueva Ecija since after World War II, with anti-Japanese guerrilla leader Eduardo Joson serving from 1959 to 1992; Aurelio Umali ended the Josons' supremacy when he defeated four-time governor Tomas Joson III in 2007 via landslide. The Josons are the ones being shortlisted by local party Bagong Lakas ng Nueva Ecija (BALANE) for the provincial governorship, with first district representative Eduardo Nonato N. Joson, Eduardo's nephew vice governor Edward Thomas and Tomas III. Eduardo claimed that Umali's 2007 victory was a fluke. Umali's governance was seen as "worse than the Josons" and several local officials identified with Lakas Kampi CMD said they are willing to cross party lines to support the Eduardo.

Umali first defeated a Joson when we wrestled the third district from now vice governor Edward Thomas in 2004. In 2007, Umali's wife Czarina also won at the third district as their representative. Umali created the local party Unang Sigaw, Partido ng Pagbabago as an answer to the Joson's BALANE.

Joson's BALANE is affiliated with the Nationalist People's Coalition (NPC), while Umali's Unang Sigaw is affiliated with Lakas Kampi CMD.

=== 1st District ===
Incumbent Eduardo Nonato N. Joson (independent) won't run to concentrate on bringing the Bagong Lakas ng Nueva Ecija party to power in the province. His sister Josefina is running as NPC's candidate.

Candidate	Party	Votes	%
Josefina Joson	Nationalist People's Coalition	107,202	53.37
Renato Diaz	Lakas–Kampi–CMD	84,750	42.19
Richard Maliwat	Liberal Party	6,388	3.18
Yolanda de Jesus	Philippine Green Republican Party	1,534	0.76
Vitaliano Ugalde	Independent	998	0.50
Total		200,872	100.00
Valid votes		200,872	88.10
Invalid/blank votes		27,133	11.90
Total votes		228,005	100.00
Nationalist People's Coalition gain from Independent			
Source: Commission on Elections

=== 2nd District ===
Joseph Gilbert Violago is the incumbent.

Candidate	Party	Votes	%
Joseph Gilbert Violago (incumbent)	Lakas–Kampi–CMD	144,507	77.94
Leopoldo Tomas	Nationalist People's Coalition	39,238	21.16
Clarita Mariano	Philippine Green Republican Party	1,655	0.89
Total		185,400	100.00
Valid votes		185,400	91.47
Invalid/blank votes		17,293	8.53
Total votes		202,693	100.00
Lakas–Kampi–CMD hold			
Source: Commission on Elections

=== 3rd District ===
Wife of incumbent governor Aurelio Umali, Czarina Umali, is the incumbent. Her main opponent will be Eduardo Joson IV.

Candidate	Party	Votes	%
Czarina Umali (incumbent)	Lakas–Kampi–CMD	135,374	62.05
Eduardo Joson IV	Nationalist People's Coalition	81,855	37.52
Josefina Salva Cruz	Philippine Green Republican Party	946	0.43
Total		218,175	100.00
Valid votes		218,175	93.55
Invalid/blank votes		15,038	6.45
Total votes		233,213	100.00
Lakas–Kampi–CMD hold			
Source: Commission on Elections

=== 4th District ===
Rodolfo Antonio is the incumbent.

Candidate	Party	Votes	%
Rodolfo Antonino (incumbent)	Lakas–Kampi–CMD	138,691	60.76
Antonio Prospero Esquivel	Pwersa ng Masang Pilipino	53,073	23.25
Julita Villareal	Nacionalista Party	29,996	13.14
Joseph Lorenzo	Liberal Party	6,510	2.85
Total		228,270	100.00
Valid votes		228,270	93.98
Invalid/blank votes		14,610	6.02
Total votes		242,880	100.00
Lakas–Kampi–CMD hold			
Source: Commission on Elections

== Pampanga ==
=== 1st District ===
Incumbent Carmelo Lazatin (Lakas Kampi CMD) will go up against Angeles City councillor Ares Yabut (NPC) and businessman Luisito Bacani from the same city (independent).

Candidate	Party	Votes	%
Carmelo Lazatin Sr. (incumbent)	Lakas–Kampi–CMD	156,619	79.34
Ares Yabut	Nationalist People's Coalition	37,121	18.80
Luisito Bacani	Independent	3,670	1.86
Total		197,410	100.00
Valid votes		197,410	88.79
Invalid/blank votes		24,924	11.21
Total votes		222,334	100.00
Lakas–Kampi–CMD hold			
Source: Commission on Elections

=== 2nd District ===
The son of President Gloria Macapagal Arroyo, Mikey Arroyo is the incumbent for two consecutive terms already. However, speculation was rife that President Arroyo herself will run in the district. The president is a registered voter of Lubao, the hometown of her father, president Diosdado Macapagal.

As early as late June 2009, several residents in the district had expressed optimism of having the president as their representative in Congress. The two most often cited reasons are her being a "kabalen" or Kapampangan descent, and being a generous benefactor to the district. The president had visited the district 13 times from February 24 to late June. In November, all six mayors in the second district expressed clamor for her to run; University of the Philippines Diliman professor Randy David had said he would run against the president, but later backpedaled if the president will not step down from the presidency when she files her certificate of candidacy by Nov. 30. In late November, the Pampanga Mayors League (PML) announced via Resolution 77, which was signed by 20 town mayors in a special session, urged the President to "heed the clamor from her constituency to run as second district representative in... Pampanga."

Pampanga gubernatorial candidate and provincial board member Lilia Pineda, a known Arroyo ally, disclosed to the Philippine Star in an interview published November 28, 2009, that Arroyo will file her certificate of candidacy on November 30. Representative Arroyo, on the other hand, has apparently given way to his mother's own congressional bid, Pineda said; meanwhile, professor David has backed out of the race. On November 30, 2009, after much speculation, President Arroyo announced on the Philippine Broadcasting Service her congressional bid for the second district of Pampanga. The president filed her certificate of candidacy on December 1, and her son Mikey retired from politics to give way for her mother to run. Only the Liberal Party is fielding a candidate against the president, with the Nacionalista Party and the United Opposition not fielding anyone. Meanwhile, Feliciano Serrano, an electronics engineer graduate of the University of Santo Tomas from Porac, also filed his own certificate of candidacy as an independent. Serrano will "campaign via text messages and the internet. The Liberal Party did find a candidate in Adonis Simpao, a civic society leader from Guagua. Simpao, a graduate of Don Honorio Ventura College of Arts and Trade in Bacolor, had no plans of running, but then governor Eddie Panlilio persuaded him on the eve of the last day of filing of certificates of candidacies. The last candidate is independent Filipinas Rosario Dayrit Sampang of Porac.

Representative Risa Hontiveros-Baraquel of the AKBAYAN party-list, who is running as one of the senatorial candidates of the Liberal Party, revealed that the president poured in 459 million pesos on infrastructure projects solely for the district. The president's political spokesperson Romulo Macalintal called Hontiveros' revelation "speculative" and baseless, pointing out that the president also had implemented infrastructure projects in places other than Pampanga. Hontiveros maintained that the president's spending in Pampanga was improper.

The Commission on Elections (COMELEC)'s Second Division junked for "lack of merit" Baraquel's disqualification case against the president on January 28, 2010; it has also junked an earlier disqualification case on January 20. This clears the president's congressional campaign at Pampanga's second district. Baraquel elevated the case to the Supreme Court.

Lakas Kampi CMD leaders had said that they will field the president as Speaker of the Philippine House of Representatives; the ruling party has more than 100 incumbents running in the House elections, and several running unopposed or by token opposition, Lakas-Kampi predicts an overwhelming number of their candidates will win their respective races, and that the president will have an easy time of being elected as speaker.

Representative Arroyo himself has been courted by several party-list organizations to be their nominee in the party-list election. An Arroyo is a party-list representative: Maria Lourdes Tuason Arroyo-Lesaca of Kasangga.

Candidate	Party	Votes	%
Gloria Macapagal Arroyo	Lakas–Kampi–CMD	169,109	84.23
Adonis Simpao	Liberal Party	20,922	10.42
Filipinas Rosario Sampang	Independent	7,150	3.56
Feliciano Serrano	Independent	3,586	1.79
Total		200,767	100.00
Valid votes		200,767	91.43
Invalid/blank votes		18,825	8.57
Total votes		219,592	100.00
Lakas–Kampi–CMD hold			
Source: Commission on Elections

=== 3rd District ===
Aurelio Gonzales Jr. is the incumbent.

The result of the election is under protest in the House of Representatives Electoral Tribunal.

Candidate	Party	Votes	%
Aurelio Gonzales Jr. (incumbent)	Lakas–Kampi–CMD	195,651	87.84
Jose Quiwa III	Liberal Party	24,640	11.06
Amado Santos	Independent	2,437	1.09
Total		222,728	100.00
Valid votes		222,728	93.25
Invalid/blank votes		16,134	6.75
Total votes		238,862	100.00
Lakas–Kampi–CMD hold			
Source: Commission on Elections

=== 4th District ===
Anna York Bondoc is the incumbent. She will face perennial challenger and former Undersecretary Rene Maglanque, who enjoys the support of both the Liberal Party and the Nationalist People's Coalition.

Candidate	Party	Votes	%
Anna York Bondoc (incumbent)	Nacionalista Party	134,510	61.05
Rene Maglanque	Nationalist People's Coalition	85,816	38.95
Total		220,326	100.00
Valid votes		220,326	94.16
Invalid/blank votes		13,673	5.84
Total votes		233,999	100.00
Nacionalista Party hold			
Source: Commission on Elections

== Tarlac ==
=== 1st District ===
Incumbent Monica Prieto-Teodoro (Lakas-Kampi-CMD), wife of presidential candidate Gilberto Teodoro decided to quit politics to support her husband's bid for presidency. Representative Teodoro succeeded her husband as representative from the 1st district, and defeated cousin China Cojuangco in 2007. Lakas Kampi CMD did not name a candidate in this district.

Candidate	Party	Votes	%
Henry Cojuangco	Nationalist People's Coalition	149,520	94.97
Efren Dancel Inocencio	Philippine Green Republican Party	7,918	5.03
Total		157,438	100.00
Valid votes		157,438	85.50
Invalid/blank votes		26,694	14.50
Total votes		184,132	100.00
Nationalist People's Coalition gain from Lakas–Kampi–CMD			
Source: Commission on Elections

=== 2nd District ===
Incumbent Jose Villa Agustin Yap (Lakas Kampi CMD), who was supposed to run again for re-election, died on March 2, 2010. His daughter, Susan Yap-Sulit, will run for the election. The name of Jose Yap will remain in the ballot and will go to Susan Yap.

Candidate	Party	Votes	%
Susan Yap	Lakas–Kampi–CMD	124,190	63.78
Genaro Mendoza	Liberal Party	70,522	36.22
Total		194,712	100.00
Valid votes		194,712	95.52
Invalid/blank votes		9,139	4.48
Total votes		203,851	100.00
Lakas–Kampi–CMD hold			
Source: Commission on Elections

=== 3rd District ===
Jeci Lapus is the incumbent.

Candidate	Party	Votes	%
Jeci Lapus (incumbent)	Lakas–Kampi–CMD	82,093	55.43
Reynaldo Catacutan	Liberal Party	65,997	44.57
Total		148,090	100.00
Valid votes		148,090	96.11
Invalid/blank votes		5,997	3.89
Total votes		154,087	100.00
Lakas–Kampi–CMD hold			
Source: Commission on Elections

== Zambales ==
=== 1st District ===
Mitos Magsaysay is the incumbent.

Candidate	Party	Votes	%
Mitos Magsaysay (incumbent)	Lakas–Kampi–CMD	89,754	61.41
Anne Marie Gordon	Bagumbayan–VNP	56,412	38.59
Total		146,166	100.00
Valid votes		146,166	96.35
Invalid/blank votes		5,540	3.65
Total votes		151,706	100.00
Lakas–Kampi–CMD hold			
Source: Commission on Elections

=== 2nd District ===
Antonio M. Diaz is the incumbent, although he switched parties from Lakas-Kampi-CMD to Lapiang Manggagawa.

Candidate	Party	Votes	%
Antonio Diaz (incumbent)	Lapiang Manggagawa	76,928	49.00
Cheryl Deloso-Montalla	Liberal Party	71,672	45.65
Alfred Mendoza	Lakas–Kampi–CMD	8,391	5.34
Total		156,991	100.00
Valid votes		156,991	92.50
Invalid/blank votes		12,725	7.50
Total votes		169,716	100.00
Lapiang Manggagawa hold			
Source: Commission on Elections
