= San Miguel Arcangel Church =

San Miguel Arcangel Church may refer to any of various churches that are dedicated to Saint Michael the archangel:

- San Miguel Arcángel Church (Cabo Rojo), Puerto Rico
- San Miguel Arcangel Parish Church (Argao), Cebu, Philippines
- San Miguel Arcangel Church (Marilao), Bulacan, Philippines
- San Miguel Arcangel Church (Masantol), Pampanga, Philippines
- San Miguel Arcangel Church (Orion), Bataan, Philippines
- San Miguel Arcangel Church (San Miguel, Bulacan), Philippines
