= Masantol =

Municipality in Pampanga, Philippines

- Municipality
- Municipality of Masantol
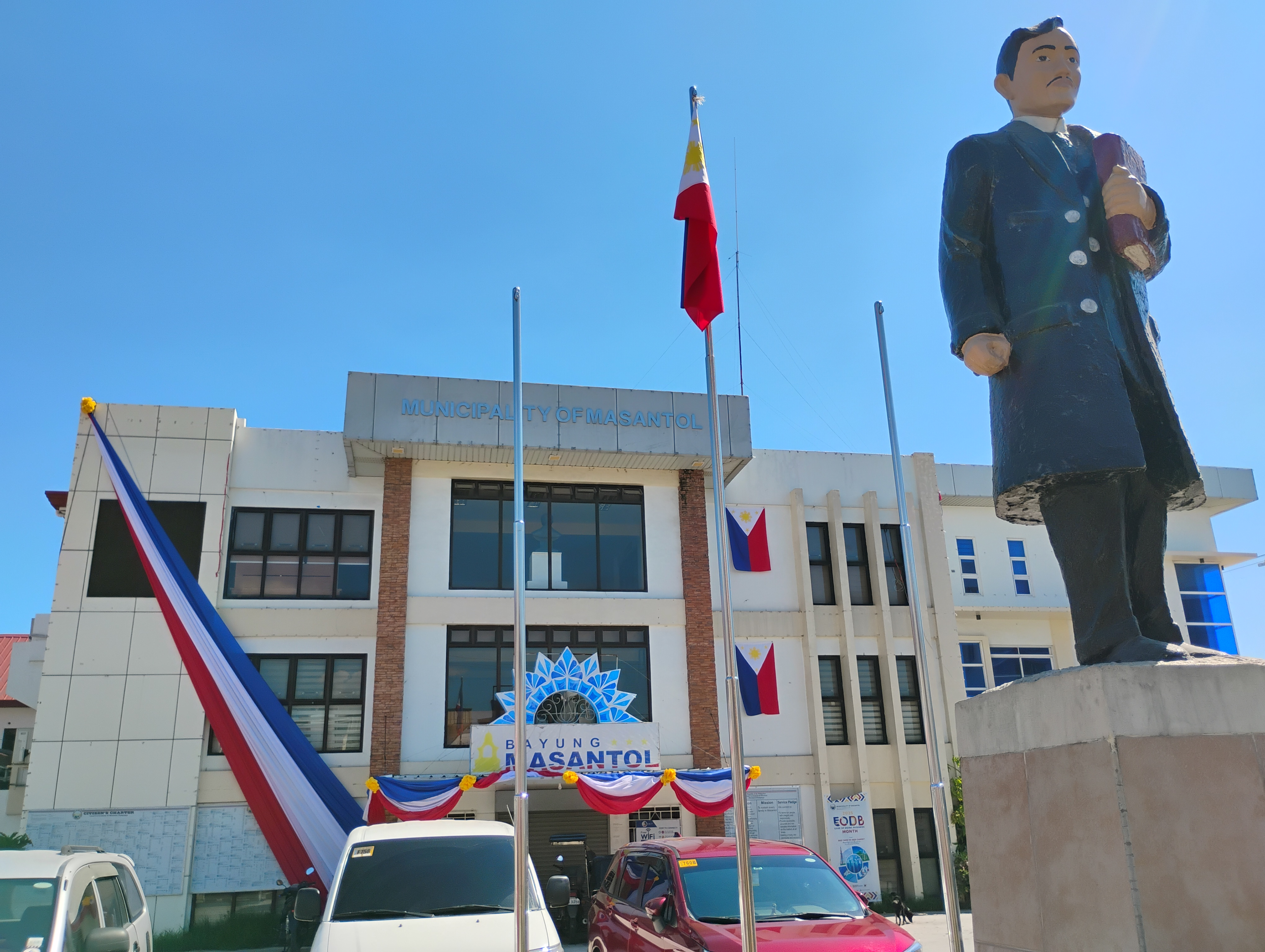
- Masantol Municipal Hall

- Seal
- Etymology: Santol
- Motto: Kayabe Kabang Bie
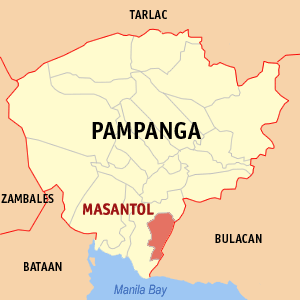
- Map of Pampanga with Masantol highlighted
- Interactive map of Masantol
- Location within the Philippines
- Coordinates: 14°54′N 120°43′E
- Country: Philippines
- Region: Central Luzon
- Province: Pampanga
- District: 4th district
- Founded: 1878
- Reinstated: 1907
- Barangays: 26 (see Barangays)

Government
  - Type: Sangguniang Bayan
  - Mayor: Danilo Guintu
  - Vice Mayor: Lucia Liezle Guintu
  - Representative: Anna York P. Bondoc-Sagum
  - Municipal Council: Members: Bernardo S. Guevarra; Ruperto O. Viray; Epifanio M. Lacap Jr.; Jennifer N. Macalino; Lucia Liezle Y. Guintu; Marcelo I. Lacap Jr.; Reynoso d.G Sunga; Carlito S. Viray
  - Electorate: 42,091 voters (2025)

Area
  - Total: 48.25 km^{2} (18.63 sq mi)
- Elevation: 5.0 m (16.4 ft)
- Highest elevation: 35 m (115 ft)
- Lowest elevation: −5 m (−16 ft)

Population (2024 census)
  - Total: 57,207
  - Density: 1,186/km^{2} (3,071/sq mi)
  - Households: 13,465

Economy
  - Income class: 1st municipal income class
  - Poverty incidence: 12.71% (2023)
  - Revenue: ₱ 223 million (2024)
  - Assets: ₱ 302.8 million (2024)
  - Expenditure: ₱ 207.7 million (2024)
  - Liabilities: ₱ 64.79 million (2024)

Service provider
  - Electricity: Pampanga 3 Electric Cooperative (PELCO 3)
- Time zone: UTC+8 (PST)
- ZIP code: 2017
- PSGC: 0305412000
- IDD : area code: +63 (0)45
- Native languages: Kapampangan; Tagalog; English
- Website: www.pampanga.gov.ph/index.php/the-government/154-capitol/districts/district-iv/masantol/336-municipality-of-masantol.html?tmpl=component&print=1

Masantol, officially the Municipality of Masantol (Kapampangan: Balen ning Masantol; Tagalog: Bayan ng Masantol), is a municipality in the province of Pampanga, Philippines. According to the 2024 census, it has a population of 57,207 people.

== Etymology ==
The municipality is named after the santol trees that used to grow abundantly in the area. Another theory suggests that the town was where santol fruits were heavily bartered (Kapampangans being fond of 'sinigang' dish).

Still another legend of how the town got its name goes like this: 'A Spanish missionary came to the town for the first time. Upon reaching a roadside corner store, he parked his horse-driven vehicle and inquired from the storekeeper the name of the place. A middle-aged woman vendor, believing that the Spanish priest was asking for the name of the fruits she was selling, readily responded in broken Spanish language, Padre, todos dulce Masantol. The priest took from his pocket a pencil and a small diary and wrote down the word mas santol, referring to the name of the place he has visited. At the time, the locality abounded with santol trees, and santol fruits were in season when the priest visited the place.

== History ==
=== Battle of Bangkusay Channel ===
Tarik Sulayman also known as Bambalito or Bankau, or for some historians, the 'unnamed ruler of Macabebe', was the indigenous leader of Macabebe from the Masantol area, who refused to ally with the Spaniards and therefore mounted an attack against the Spanish forces of Miguel López de Legazpi during the Battle of Bangkusay Channel on June 3, 1571. The joint forces of Macabebe, Calumpit, Hagonoy and Maynila under Rajah Sulayman III were defeated by the joint forces of the Spanish Armada and Tagalog mercenaries, with Tarik Sulayman himself killed in battle. Consequently, this victory enabled the Spaniards to establish themselves throughout Luzon.

=== San Miguel de Masantol ===
Originally named San Miguel de Masantol and a part of the town of Macabebe, three of the town's leading patriarchs - Manuel Fajardo, Gregorio Bautista, and Juan Lacap - filed a motion on June 26, 1877, to separate the barrios of Bebe, Bulacus, Caingin and Nigui from Macabebe thereby creating a new Spanish pueblo called San Miguel. This new pueblo was approved by Spanish Governor General Domingo Moriones y Murillo and was inaugurated on May 1, 1878. On November 30, 1893, the Catholic Parish of San Miguel was formally acknowledged through a Royal Decree. For a while it came to be known San Miguel Masantol, until popular usage reverted it to the original name.

=== Independent municipality ===
On July 26, 1904, Masantol once more became part of Macabebe. However, in 1907, Masantol was again reinstated as a separate independent municipality and this lasted up to the present.

=== Contemporary ===
On January 7, 2008, one person drowned, another went missing and 40 others were injured due to electric shocks, when a live cable hit the floating pagoda boat in the fluvial festival of Virgen La Purisima Concepcion at Barangay Alauli.

== Geography ==
Masantol is almost surrounded by the municipality of Macabebe (For it was once a former part of the town). It is known to be the southernmost town in the province of Pampanga. It is bounded to the north by the municipality of Macabebe; to the east by the municipalities of Calumpit and Hagonoy in Bulacan; to the west by Macabebe; and to the south by some parts of Macabebe and Manila Bay.

Masantol is 18 kilometres (11 mi) from San Fernando and 62 kilometres (39 mi) from Manila.

=== Climate ===
Climate data for Masantol, Pampanga
Month	Jan	Feb	Mar	Apr	May	Jun	Jul	Aug	Sep	Oct	Nov	Dec	Year
Mean daily maximum °C (°F)	28 (82)	29 (84)	31 (88)	33 (91)	32 (90)	31 (88)	30 (86)	29 (84)	29 (84)	30 (86)	30 (86)	28 (82)	30 (86)
Mean daily minimum °C (°F)	20 (68)	20 (68)	21 (70)	23 (73)	24 (75)	24 (75)	24 (75)	24 (75)	24 (75)	23 (73)	22 (72)	21 (70)	23 (72)
Average precipitation mm (inches)	6 (0.2)	4 (0.2)	6 (0.2)	17 (0.7)	82 (3.2)	122 (4.8)	151 (5.9)	123 (4.8)	124 (4.9)	99 (3.9)	37 (1.5)	21 (0.8)	792 (31.1)
Average rainy days	3.3	2.5	3.6	6.6	17.7	22.2	25.2	23.7	23.2	17.9	9.2	5.2	160.3
Source: Meteoblue

=== Barangays ===
Masantol is politically subdivided into 26 barangays, as shown below. Each barangay consists of puroks and some have sitios.

- Alauli
- Bagang
- Balibago
- Bebe Anac
- Bebe Matua
- Bulacus
- San Agustin (Caingin)
- Santa Monica (Caingin)
- Cambasi
- Malauli
- Nigui
- Palimpe
- Puti
- Sagrada (Tibagin)
- San Isidro Anac
- San Isidro Matua (Poblacion)
- San Nicolas (Poblacion)
- San Pedro
- Santa Cruz
- Santa Lucia Matua
- Santa Lucia Paguiaba
- Santa Lucia Wakas
- Santa Lucia Anac (Poblacion)
- Sapang Kawayan
- Sua
- Santo Niño

==== Sitios ====
- Bebe Arabia
- Sagrada 2

== Demographics ==
Population census of Masantol

Year	Pop.	±% p.a.
1903	7,076	—
1918	9,636	+2.08%
1939	14,095	+1.83%
1948	15,770	+1.26%
1960	24,159	+3.62%
1970	30,538	+2.37%
1975	32,658	+1.36%
1980	35,350	+1.60%

Year	Pop.	±% p.a.
1990	41,964	+1.73%
1995	45,326	+1.45%
2000	48,120	+1.29%
2007	50,984	+0.80%
2010	52,407	+1.01%
2015	57,063	+1.63%
2020	57,990	+0.34%
2024	57,207	−0.33%

Source: Philippine Statistics Authority

In the 2024 census, the population of Masantol was 57,207 people, with a density of 1,200 inhabitants per square kilometre or 3,100 inhabitants per square mile.

=== Religion ===
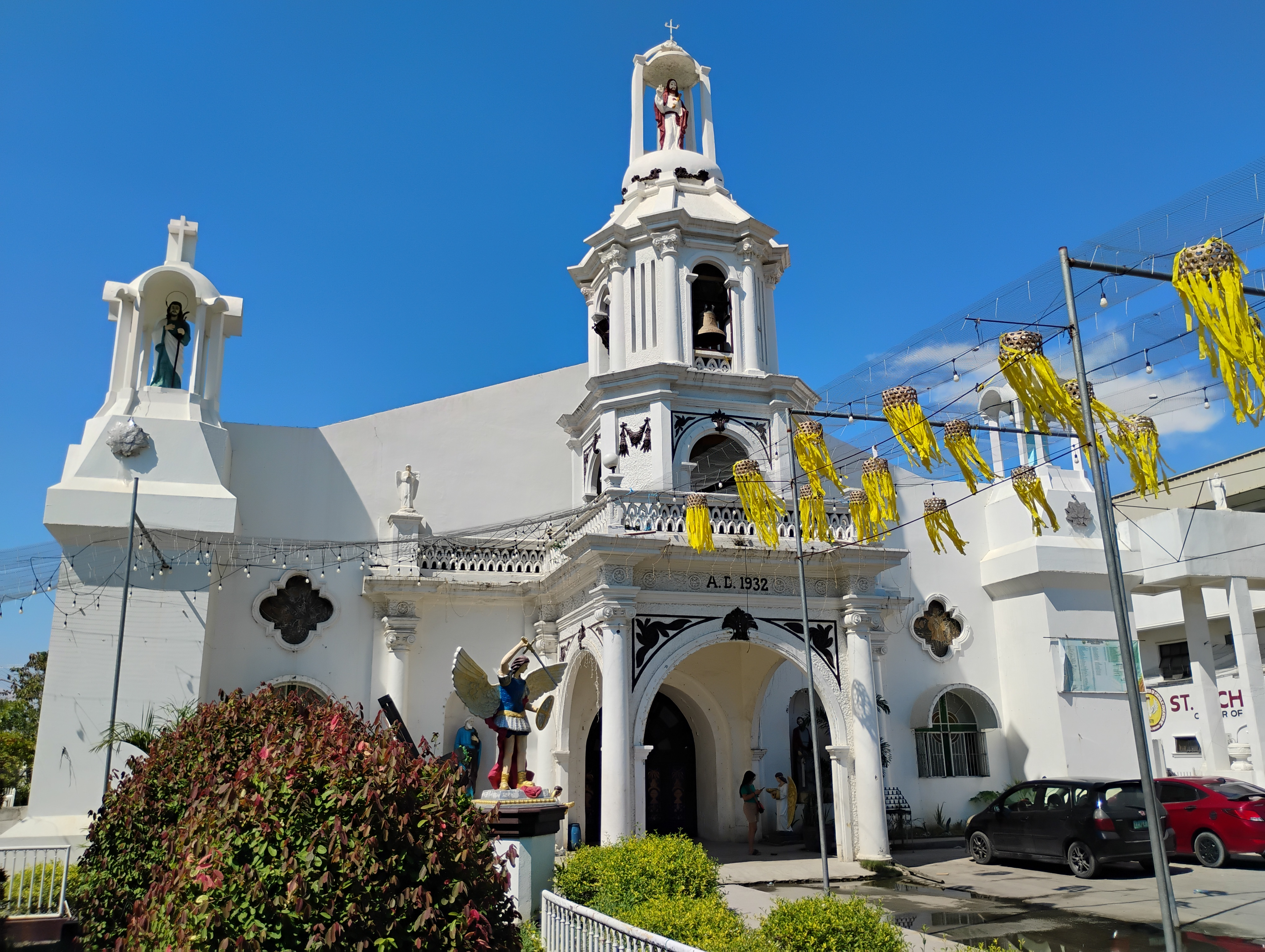
Saint Michael the Archangel Parish Church

The majority of the population are members of the Roman Catholic Church where each village or barangay has its own fiesta. The main Roman Catholic parish church of the town is the San Miguel Parish Church in Barangay San Nicolas which was established in the late 20th century. 80% of the population identified with the Roman Catholic Church and it is followed by the Iglesia Ni Cristo, Islam, and other beliefs.

== Economy ==
Poverty incidence of Masantol (%)

Source: Philippine Statistics Authority

== Festivals ==
- Batalla San Miguel Arkangel (Apung Igue) - May 8, All Masantolenos
- Battalla Santo Niño - every last Sunday of January. - Barangay Santo Nino
- Batalla Santa Monica - May 4. - Barangay Santa Monica Caingin
- Batalla San Roque de Montpelier (Apung Duque) - August 15,16,17 Sitio Bebe Arabia, Barangay Bebe Anac
- Batalla San Roque (Apung Duque) - 3rd or 4th Sunday of April - Sitio Bebe Arabia, Barangay Bebe Anac, Barangay Bebe Matua
- Batalla San Roque de Montpelier (Apung Duque) - August 15,16,17 Barangay Bebe Matua
- Fiesta de San Nicolas (Apung Culas) - May 12 and September 10 - Barangay San Nicolas
- Feast of The HOLY ROSARY - every 2nd Saturday of October in BULACUS MASANTOL
- Batalla de Santa Lucia (Apung Lucia) - December 13 of the year. - Barangay Santa Lucia Wakas, Matua, Anac
- Batalla de San Agustin (Apung Gustin)- August 28 Barangay San Agustin Caingin
- Limbun at Libad or Labas Larawan (Celebration of the Saints) in each barrio/barangay celebrating their patron saint for ones a week in January.
- Nuestra Señora Dela Paz Y Buenviaje Festival- Baranggay Sapang Kawayan

== Education ==
There are two schools district offices which govern all educational institutions within the municipality. They oversee the management and operations of all private and public, from primary to secondary schools. These are the Masantol North Schools District Office, and Masantol South Schools District Office.

=== Primary and elementary schools ===
- Alauli Elementary School
- Bagang Elementary School
- Bagang Elementary School
- Balibago Elementary School
- Balibago Elementary School
- Bebe Anac Elementary School
- Bebe Matua Elementary School
- Caingin Elementary School
- Masantol Elementary School
- Nigui Elementary School
- Palimpe Elementary School
- Puti Elementary School
- Sagrada Elementary School
- San Isidro (Talba) Elementary School
- San Nicolas Elementary School
- San Pedro Elementary School
- Santa Cruz (Annex) Elementary School
- Santa Cruz Main Elementary School
- Santa Lucia Elementary school
- St. Michael The Archangel Archdiocesan Parochial School Exclusive Catholic School
- Sua Elementary School

=== Secondary schools ===
- Holy Child of Mary Academy
- Malauli High School
- Masantol High School
- Tarik Suliman High School
- Tomas Garcia Guintu Senior High School
- Pampanga Institute
- San Miguel Academy

=== Technical school ===
- TESDA Vocational Training Center

=== Higher educational institution ===
- Pampanga Institute

== Gallery ==
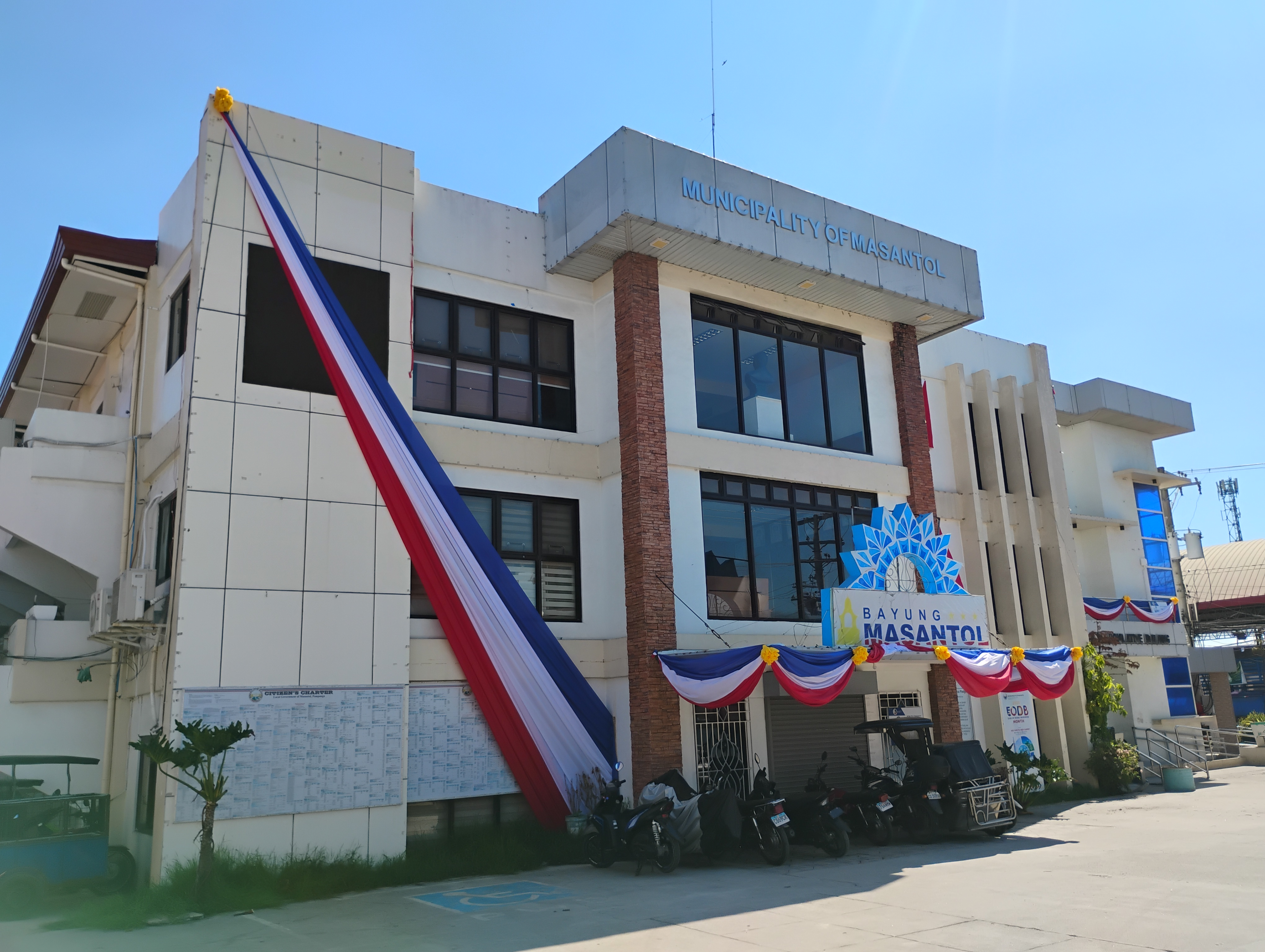
Municipal Hall

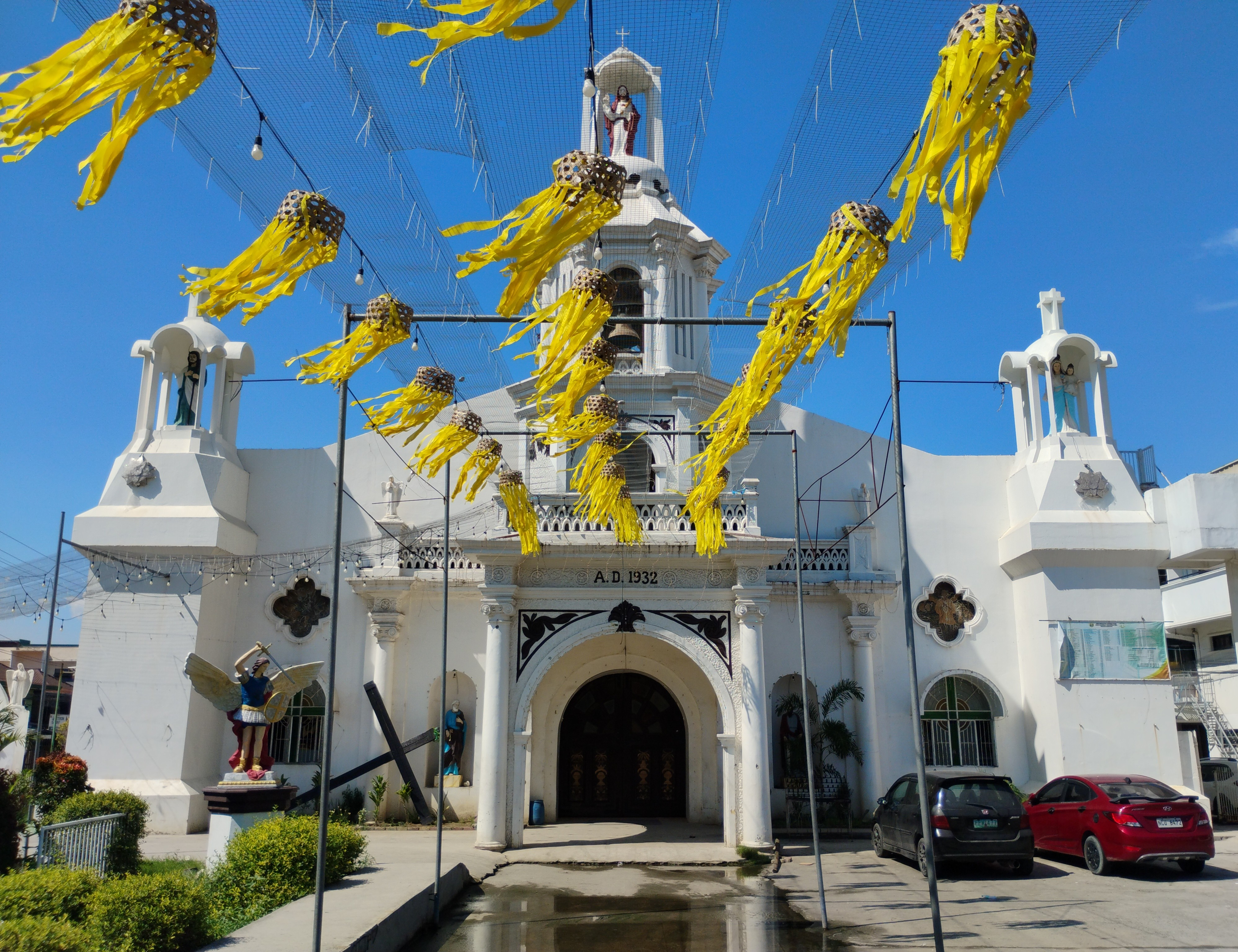
Saint Michael the Archangel Parish Church

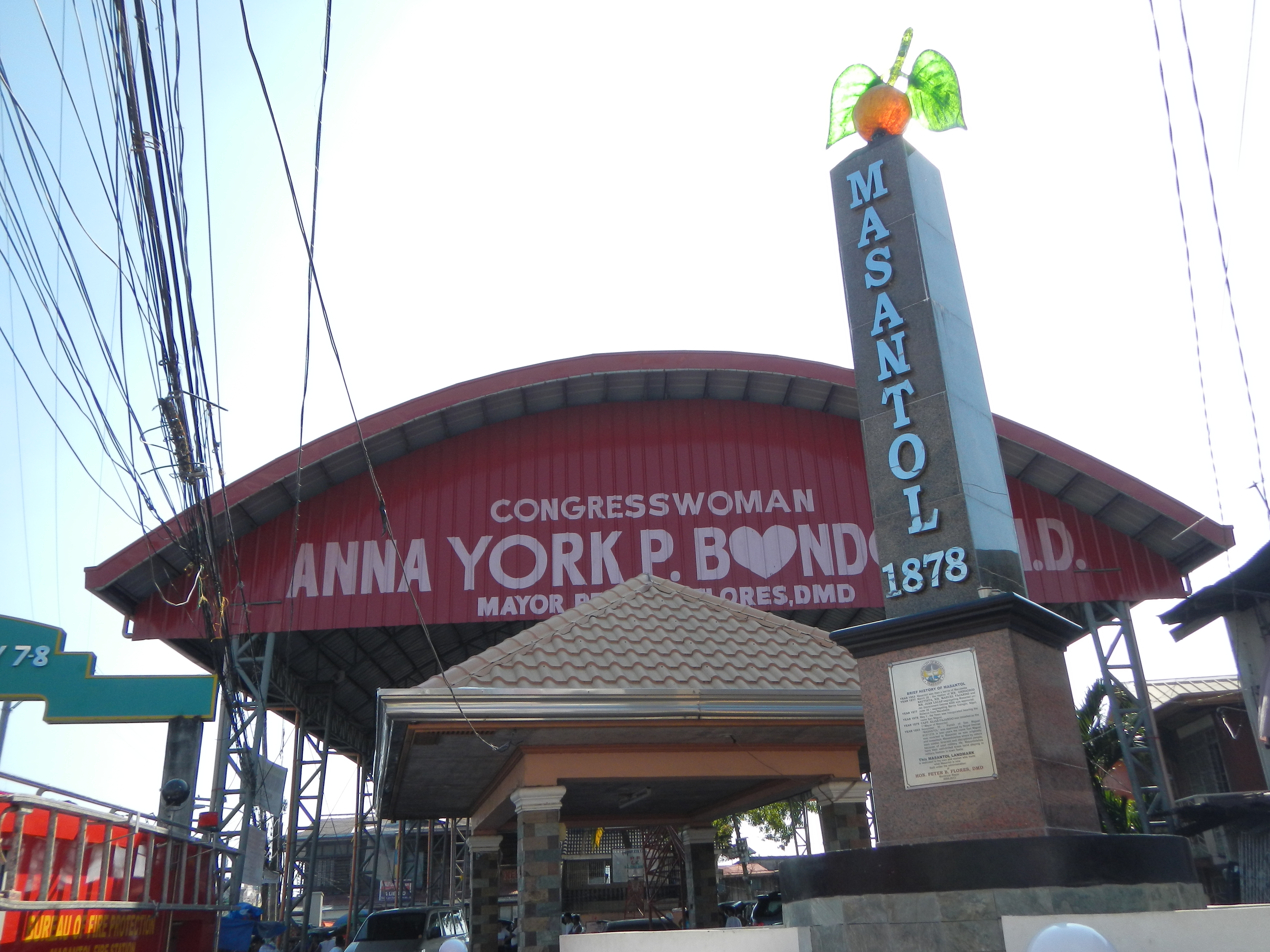
Covered court and 1878 Masantol Monument

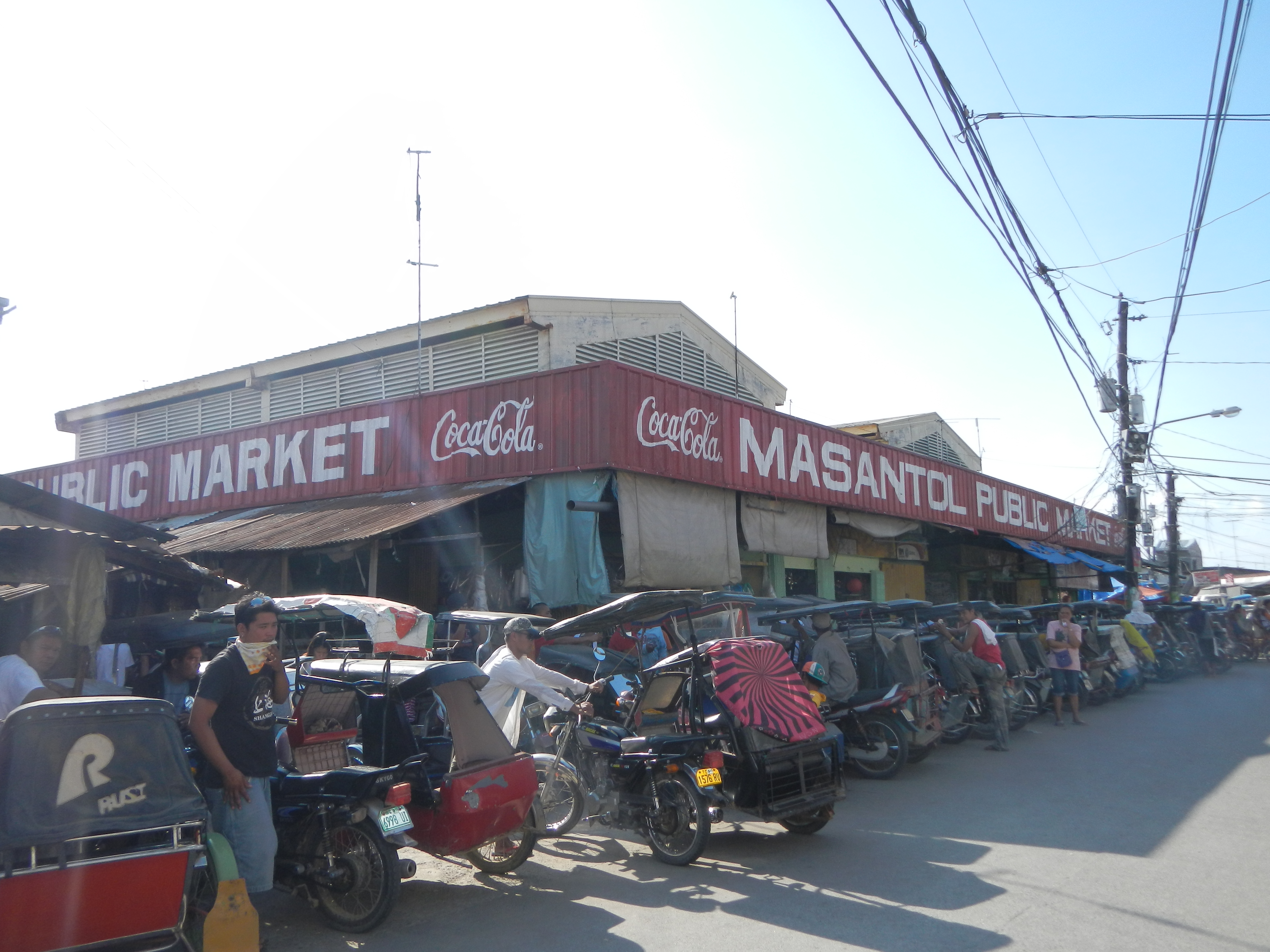
Public Market

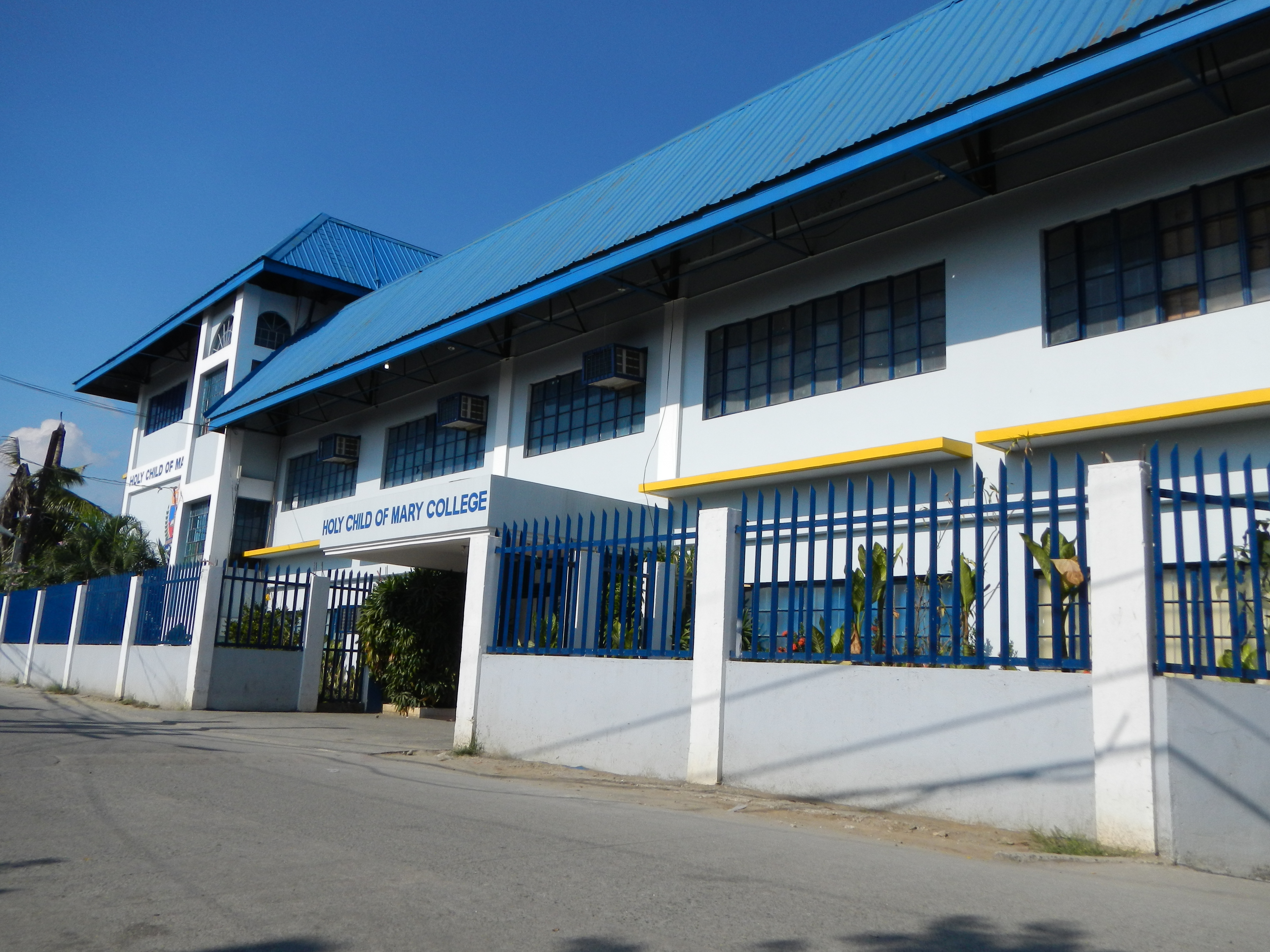
Holy Child of Mary College

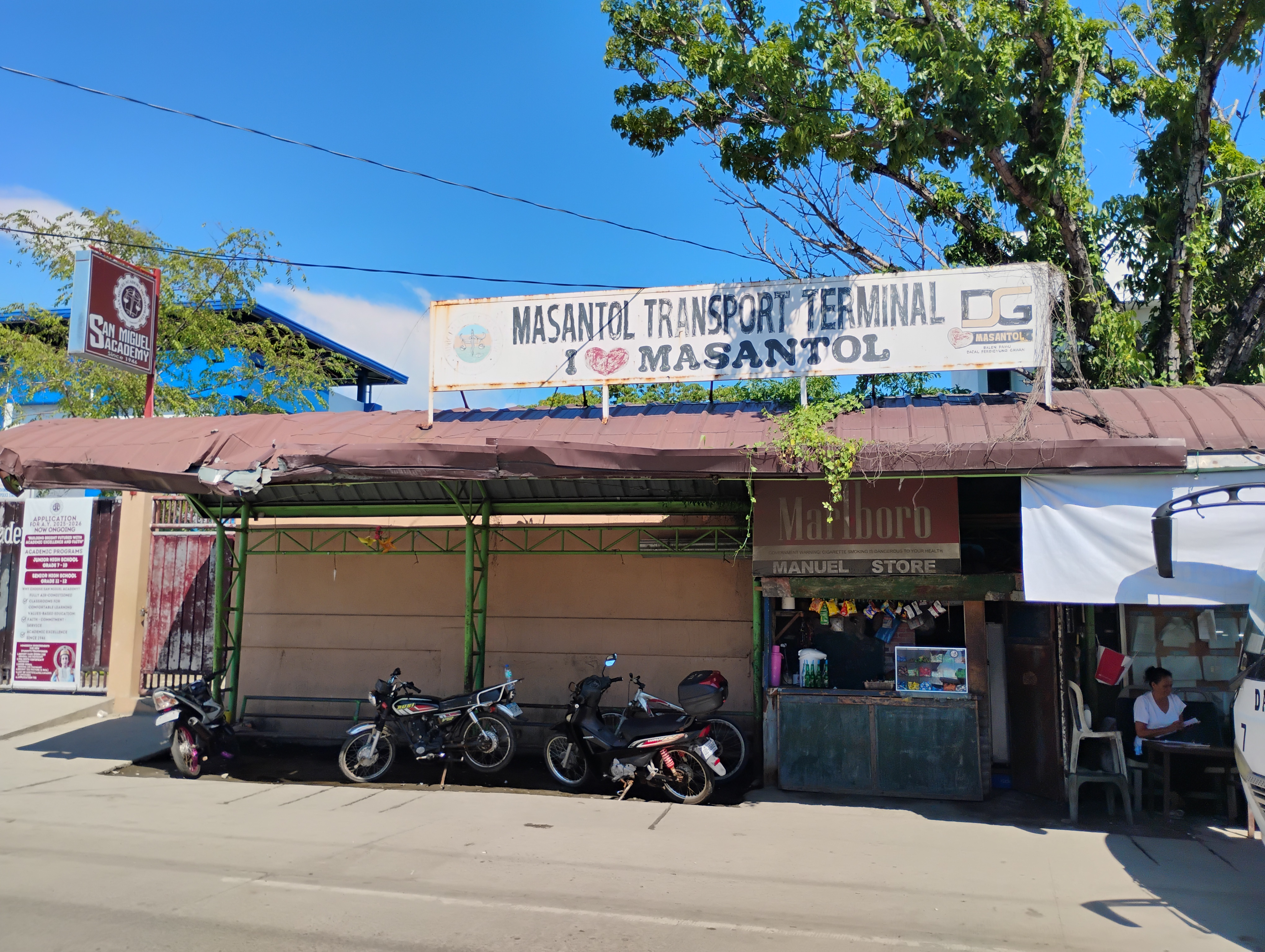
Transport Terminal
