= Pampanga's 4th congressional district =

Legislative district of the Philippines

- Constituency for the House of Representatives of the Philippines
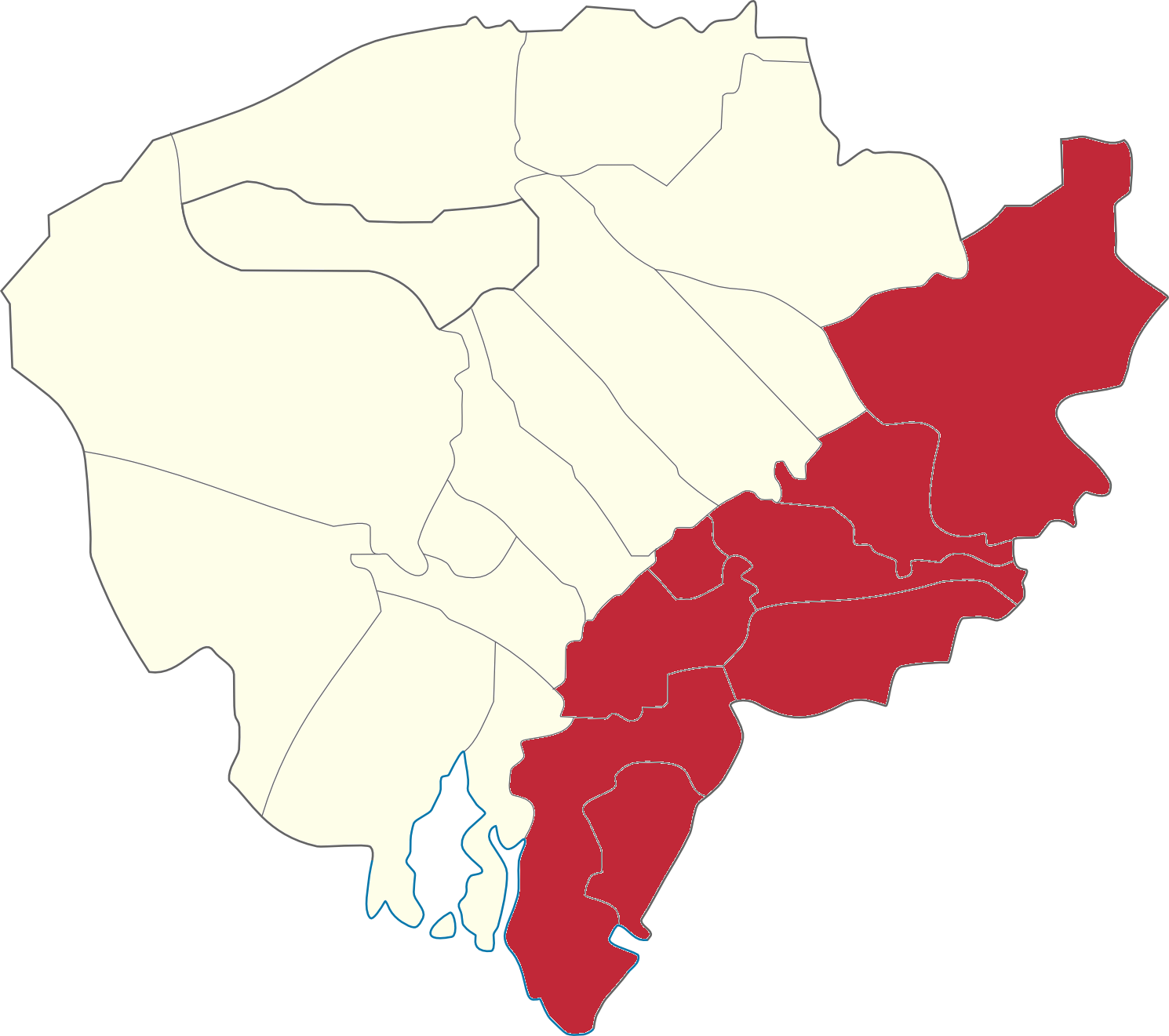
- Boundary of Pampanga's 4th congressional district in Pampanga

- Location of Pampanga within the Philippines
- Province: Pampanga
- Region: Central Luzon
- Population: 678,935 (2025)
- Electorate: 499,765 (2025)
- Major settlements: 8 LGUs: Municipalities; Apalit; Candaba; Macabebe; Masantol; Minalin; San Luis; San Simon; Santo Tomas
- Area: 575.05 km^{2} (222.03 sq mi)

Current constituency
- Created: 1987
- Representative: Anna York Bondoc
- Political party: NUP; KAMBILAN
- Congressional bloc: Majority

Pampanga's 4th Congressional District is one of the four congressional districts of the Philippines in the province of Pampanga. It has been represented in the House of Representatives since 1987. It consists of municipalities in southern and eastern Pampanga, namely: Apalit, Candaba, Macabebe, Masantol, Minalin, San Luis, San Simon and Santo Tomas. It is currently represented in the 20th Congress by Anna York Bondoc of the National Unity Party and Kambilan.

== Representation history ==
#	Image	Member	Term of office		Congress	Party	Electoral history	Constituent LGUs
#	Image	Member	Start	End	Congress	Party	Electoral history	Constituent LGUs
=== Pampanga's 4th district for the House of Representatives of the Philippines ===
District created February 2, 1987.
1		Marciano M. Pineda	June 30, 1987	January 28, 1992	8th	LnB	Elected in 1987. Removed from office after an electoral protest.	1987–present Apalit, Candaba, Macabebe, Masantol, Minalin, San Luis, San Simon, Santo Tomas
1		Marciano M. Pineda	June 30, 1987	January 28, 1992	8th	PDP–Laban	Elected in 1987. Removed from office after an electoral protest.	1987–present Apalit, Candaba, Macabebe, Masantol, Minalin, San Luis, San Simon, Santo Tomas
2		Emigdio A. Bondoc	January 28, 1992	November 24, 1997	8th	Nacionalista	Declared winner of 1987 elections.	1987–present Apalit, Candaba, Macabebe, Masantol, Minalin, San Luis, San Simon, Santo Tomas
2		Emigdio A. Bondoc	January 28, 1992	November 24, 1997	9th	Nacionalista	Re-elected in 1992.	1987–present Apalit, Candaba, Macabebe, Masantol, Minalin, San Luis, San Simon, Santo Tomas
2		Emigdio A. Bondoc	January 28, 1992	November 24, 1997	10th	Lakas	Re-elected in 1995. Died.	1987–present Apalit, Candaba, Macabebe, Masantol, Minalin, San Luis, San Simon, Santo Tomas
-		vacant	November 24, 1997	June 30, 1998	10th	—	No special election to fill vacancy.	1987–present Apalit, Candaba, Macabebe, Masantol, Minalin, San Luis, San Simon, Santo Tomas
3		Juan Pablo Bondoc	June 30, 1998	June 30, 2004	11th	Lakas	Elected in 1998.	1987–present Apalit, Candaba, Macabebe, Masantol, Minalin, San Luis, San Simon, Santo Tomas
3		Juan Pablo Bondoc	June 30, 1998	June 30, 2004	12th	NPC	Re-elected in 2001.	1987–present Apalit, Candaba, Macabebe, Masantol, Minalin, San Luis, San Simon, Santo Tomas
4		Anna York Bondoc	June 30, 2004	June 30, 2013	13th	Nacionalista	Elected in 2004.	1987–present Apalit, Candaba, Macabebe, Masantol, Minalin, San Luis, San Simon, Santo Tomas
4		Anna York Bondoc	June 30, 2004	June 30, 2013	14th	Nacionalista	Re-elected in 2007.	1987–present Apalit, Candaba, Macabebe, Masantol, Minalin, San Luis, San Simon, Santo Tomas
4		Anna York Bondoc	June 30, 2004	June 30, 2013	15th	Nacionalista	Re-elected in 2010.	1987–present Apalit, Candaba, Macabebe, Masantol, Minalin, San Luis, San Simon, Santo Tomas
(3)		Juan Pablo Bondoc	June 30, 2013	June 30, 2022	16th	Nacionalista	Elected in 2013.	1987–present Apalit, Candaba, Macabebe, Masantol, Minalin, San Luis, San Simon, Santo Tomas
(3)		Juan Pablo Bondoc	June 30, 2013	June 30, 2022	17th	PDP–Laban (KAMBILAN)	Re-elected in 2016.	1987–present Apalit, Candaba, Macabebe, Masantol, Minalin, San Luis, San Simon, Santo Tomas
(3)		Juan Pablo Bondoc	June 30, 2013	June 30, 2022	18th	PDP–Laban (KAMBILAN)	Re-elected in 2019.	1987–present Apalit, Candaba, Macabebe, Masantol, Minalin, San Luis, San Simon, Santo Tomas
(4)		Anna York Bondoc	June 30, 2022	Incumbent	19th	Nacionalista (KAMBILAN)	Elected in 2022.	1987–present Apalit, Candaba, Macabebe, Masantol, Minalin, San Luis, San Simon, Santo Tomas
(4)		Anna York Bondoc	June 30, 2022	Incumbent	20th	NUP (KAMBILAN)	Re-elected in 2025.	1987–present Apalit, Candaba, Macabebe, Masantol, Minalin, San Luis, San Simon, Santo Tomas

== Election results ==
=== 2025 ===
2025 Philippine House of Representatives elections
Candidate	Party	Votes	%
Anna York Bondoc (incumbent)	Nacionalista Party	203,602	65.32
Jorge Antonio Bustos	Independent	105,944	33.99
Edgar Puno	Independent	2,156	0.69
Total		311,702	100.00
Valid votes		311,702	94.48
Invalid/blank votes		18,207	5.52
Total votes		329,909	100.00
Registered voters/turnout		386,049	85.46
Source: Commission on Elections

=== 2022 ===
2022 Philippine House of Representatives elections
Party	Candidate	Votes	%
Nacionalista	Anna York Bondoc	258,625	96.24
Independent	Regino Mallari	10,095	3.76
Total votes		268,720	100
Nacionalista gain from PDP–Laban			

=== 2019 ===
2019 Philippine House of Representatives elections
Party	Candidate	Votes	%
PDP–Laban	Juan Pablo "Rimpy" Bondoc (incumbent)	173,460	
Independent	Ric Yabut	75,055	
Independent	Regino Mallari	1,670	
Total votes			100
PDP–Laban hold			

=== 2016 ===
2016 Philippine House of Representatives elections
Party	Candidate	Votes	%
Nacionalista	Juan Pablo Bondoc (incumbent)	148,641	
NPC	Oscar Jun Tetangco	85,643	
Invalid or blank votes		19,933	
Total votes		254,217	
Nacionalista hold			

=== 2013 ===
2013 Philippine House of Representatives elections
Party	Candidate	Votes	%
Nacionalista	Juan Pablo Bondoc	105,610	50.84
NPC	Jerry Pelayo	83,585	40.23
Independent	Ramon Sediego	830	0.40
Margin of victory		22,025	10.60%
Invalid or blank votes		17,724	8.53
Total votes		207,749	100.00
Nacionalista hold			

=== 2010 ===
2010 Philippine House of Representatives elections
Candidate	Party	Votes	%
Anna York Bondoc (incumbent)	Nacionalista Party	134,510	61.05
Rene Maglanque	Nationalist People's Coalition	85,816	38.95
Total		220,326	100.00
Valid votes		220,326	94.16
Invalid/blank votes		13,673	5.84
Total votes		233,999	100.00
Nacionalista Party hold			
Source: Commission on Elections

=== 2007 ===
2007 Philippine House of Representatives elections
Party	Candidate	Votes	%
Nacionalista	Anna York Bondoc (incumbent)	122,496	
NPC	Rene Maglanque	47,238	
Independent	Jay Sonza	951	
PMP	Reynaldo Taruc	102	
Margin of victory			
Invalid or blank votes			
Total votes			
Nacionalista hold			

=== 1998 ===
1998 Philippine House of Representatives elections
Candidate	Party	Votes	%
Juan Pablo Bondoc	Lakas–NUCD–UMDP	97,204	58.96
Marciano Pineda	Laban ng Makabayang Masang Pilipino	60,509	36.70
Edgardo Puno	Lakas–NUCD–UMDP	7,051	4.28
Jose Teofilo Mercado	Independent	53	0.03
Macario Viray	Independent	43	0.03
Total		164,860	100.00
Source: Commission on Elections

=== 1995 ===
1995 Philippine House of Representatives elections
Candidate	Party	Votes	%
Emigdio Bondoc (incumbent)	Lakas–NUCD–UMDP	68,789	57.87
Ma. Cristina Tetangco	Independent	49,686	41.80
Alfonso Sagcal	Independent	395	0.33
Total		118,870	100.00
Source: Commission on Elections

=== 1992 ===
1992 Philippine House of Representatives elections
Candidate	Party	Votes	%
Emigdio Bondoc (incumbent)	Nacionalista Party	47,811	51.95
Marciano Pineda	Lakas–NUCD	21,084	22.91
Cicero Punzalan	Nationalist People's Coalition	11,399	12.38
Ernesto Pineda	Koalisyong Pambansa	5,387	5.85
Reynaldo Sagum	People's Reform Party	3,757	4.08
Antonio Salvador	People's Reform Party	2,573	2.80
Manuel Quito	Independent	30	0.03
Total		92,041	100.00
Source: Commission on Elections

== See also ==
- Legislative districts of Pampanga
