= Juan Pablo Bondoc =

Filipino politician

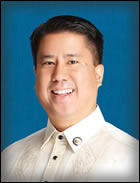
- Official portrait, 2013

Deputy Speaker of the House of Representatives of the Philippines
- In office December 7, 2020 – June 30, 2022
- House Speaker: Lord Allan Velasco

Member of the House of Representatives from the Pampanga's 4th District
- In office June 30, 2013 – June 30, 2022
- Preceded by: Anna York Bondoc
- Succeeded by: Anna York Bondoc
- In office June 30, 1998 – June 30, 2004
- Preceded by: Vacant (last hold by Emigdio Bondoc in 1992)
- Succeeded by: Anna York Bondoc

Personal details
- Born: Juan Pablo Puyat Bondoc; April 9, 1969 (age 57)
- Party: PDP (2017–present); KAMBILAN (local party; 2018–present)
- Other political affiliations: Nacionalista (2009–2017); NPC (2001–2009); Lakas (1998–2001)
- Spouse: Paula Locsin
- Relations: Anna York Bondoc (sister); Gil Puyat (granduncle)
- Children: 3
- Parent(s): Emigdio A. Bondoc (father); Margarita Puyat (mother)
- Education: University of the Philippines Diliman (BS); Harvard University (MPA)

Juan Pablo "Rimpy" Puyat Bondoc (born April 9, 1969) is a Filipino politician who served as a deputy speaker and member in the House of Representatives of the Philippines representing the 4th district of Pampanga. He was also a deputy majority leader of the House of Representatives.

== Education ==
Bondoc attended Xavier School for his primary and secondary education, and the University of the Philippines Diliman for Business Administration and Harvard University for his Masters in Public Administration.

== Political career ==
Bondoc is a member of the Partido Demokratiko Pilipino-Lakas ng Bayan Party of President Rodrigo Duterte.

He entered politics in 1998, when he was elected as representative of the 4th district of Pampanga after the death of his father.

== Personal life ==
Bondoc is a member of Upsilon Sigma Phi.

House of Representatives of the Philippines
Preceded by Anna York Bondoc	Member of the House of Representatives from Pampanga's 4th district 2013–2022	Succeeded by Anna York Bondoc
Preceded by Emigdio A. Bondoc	Member of the House of Representatives from Pampanga's 4th district 1998–2004	Succeeded by Anna York Bondoc
