= Saint Michael the Archangel Parish Church (Masantol) =

Roman Catholic church in Pampanga, Philippines

Masantol Church
- Saint Michael the Archangel Parish Church
- Parokya ni San Miguel Arcangel (Filipino); Parroquia de San Miguel Arcángel (Spanish)
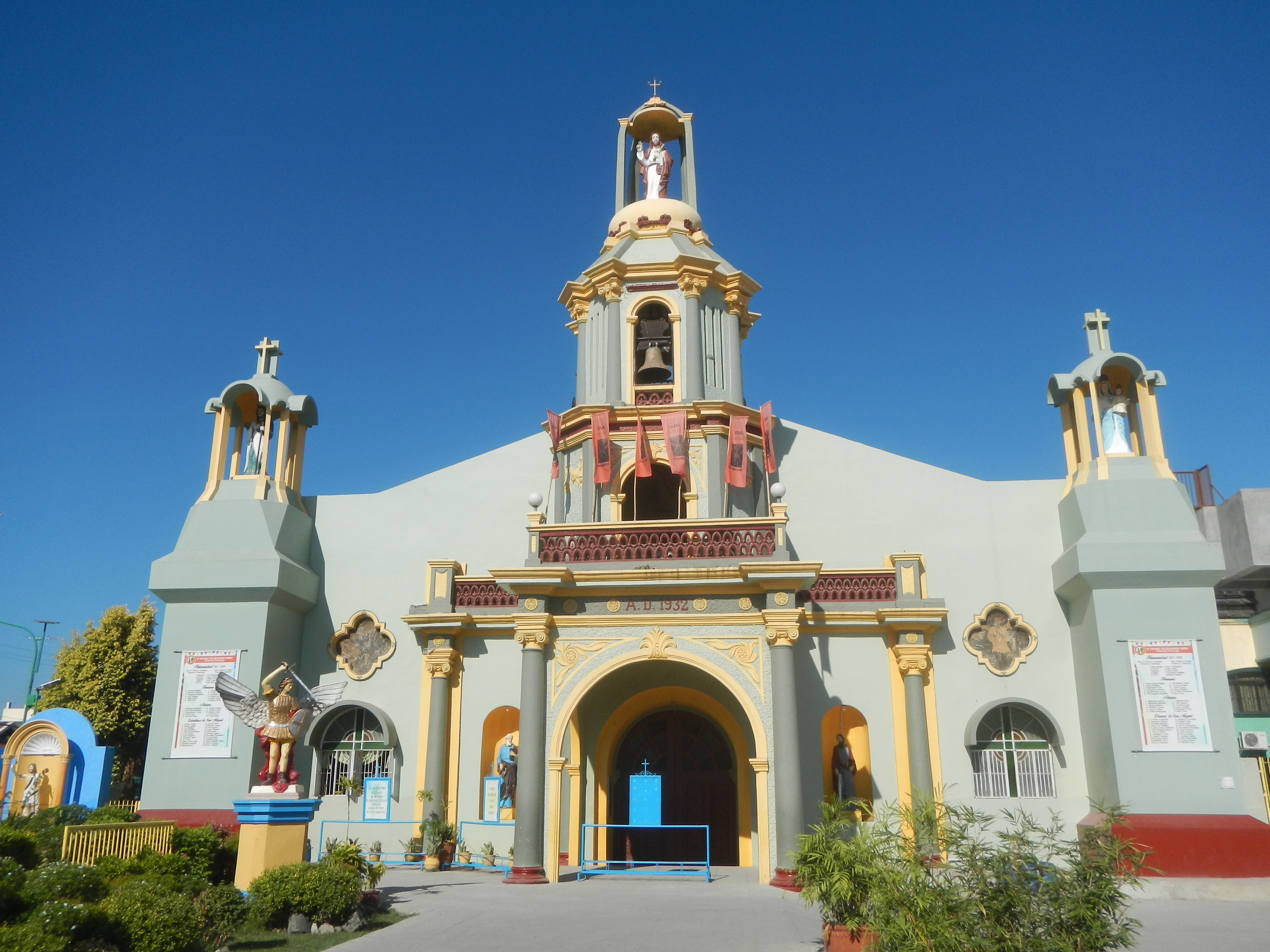
- Church facade in 2018

- Location in Luzon Location in the Philippines
- 14°53′36″N 120°42′21″E
- Location: San Nicolas, Masantol, Pampanga
- Country: Philippines
- Denomination: Roman Catholic

History
- Status: Parish church
- Founded: 1894
- Dedication: Michael the Archangel

Architecture
- Functional status: Active
- Architectural type: Church building
- Style: Baroque, Renaissance
- Completed: 1923

Specifications
- Materials: Cement, Steel

Administration
- Province: Ecclesiastical Province of San Fernando
- Archdiocese: San Fernando

Saint Michael the Archangel Parish Church, commonly known as Masantol Church, is an early 20th-century Renaissance-style Roman Catholic church located at Barangay San Nicolas, Masantol, Pampanga, Philippines. The parish church, under the patronage of Saint Michael the Archangel, is under the Archdiocese of San Fernando.

== History ==
The parish of Masantol was the last parish founded by the Augustinian Friars in Pampanga. With the move for secession of barrios Bebe, Caingin, Nuigin and Bulacus from the town of Macabebe to form Masantol in 1877 and its official inauguration in 1878, the parishioners of Masantol soon felt the need to separate from Macabebe's parish of Saint Nicholas. The parishioners’ demand for a separate parish began in 1884, shortly after the lobbying of its prominent citizens for the establishment of a new, independent town. Later, on January 13, 1894, the parish of San Miguel de Masantol was erected. The parish priests of Macabebe started the parochial structures for Masantol. The construction that started during the last years of the 19th-century was completed in 1901, under the term of Archbishop Bernardino Nozaleda, with Father Jose Mariano as first parish priest. A parish house was erected in 1927 during the time of Father Teodoro Tantengco. During the stay of Monsignor Bartolome Zabala in 1932, the entire church complex, including the patio, was renovated. In the 1980s, the church was repaired using steel and cement.

== Architecture ==
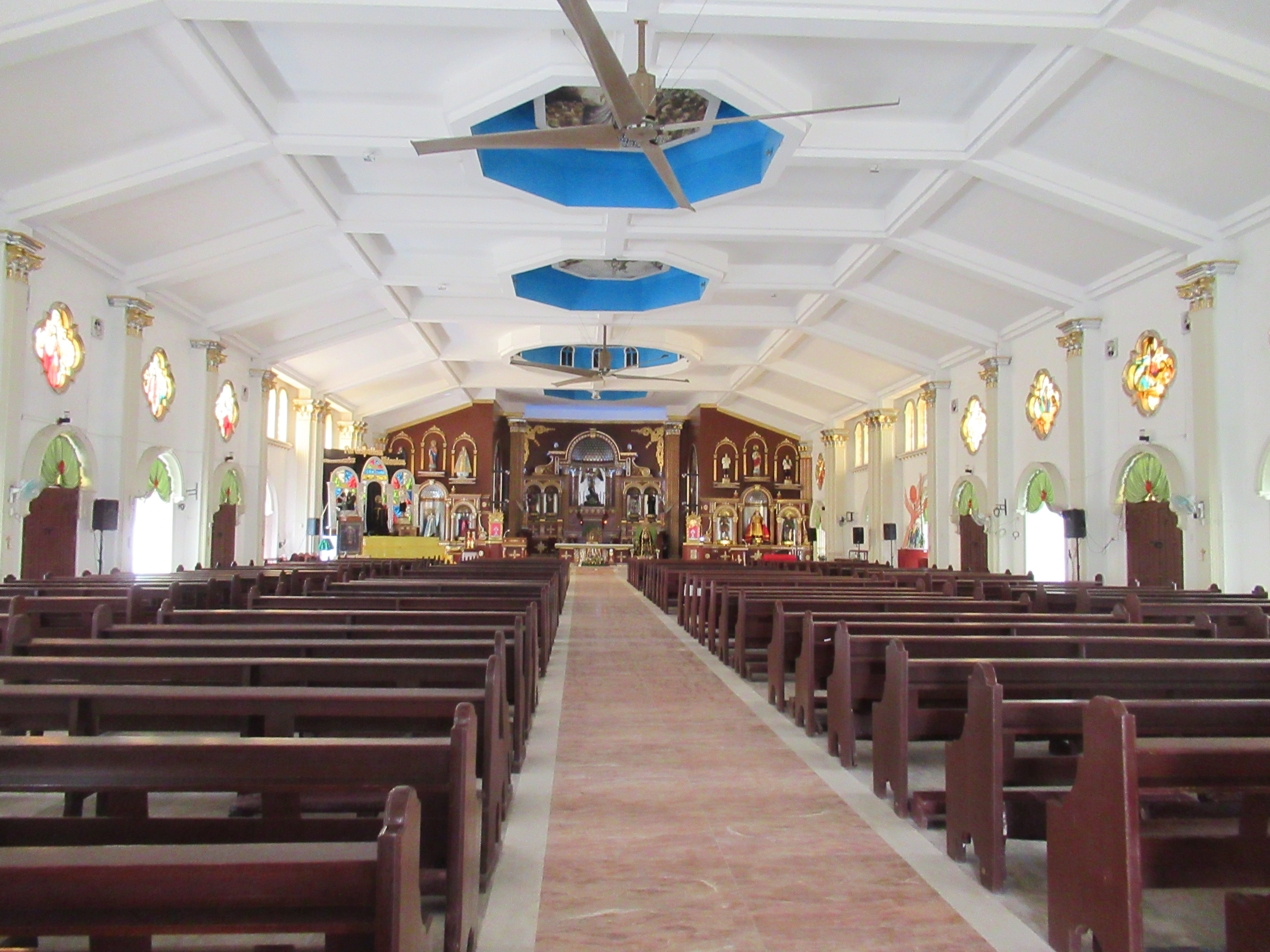
Church interior in 2022

The façade of the church is generally described as that of Renaissance-style, sporting different architectural features not commonly found incorporated in one structure. The central focus when viewing the façade is the central bell tower with its base supported by semicircular arches, Doric columns supporting the first and third levels, scroll-like ornamentations, and balustraded second level. The façade expands horizontally, with bare walls punctured by rose windows and semicircular arch windows, and ends with huge rectangular buttresses topped with religious images cased inside urnas or canopied niches. The year 1923 is inscribed in the façade, referring to the repairs made during the time of Monsignor Zabala.
