= Anna York Bondoc =

Filipino pulmonologist and politician

Anna York Bondoc-Sagum
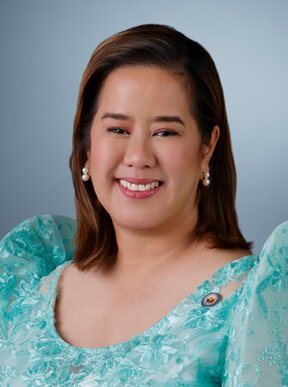
- Official portrait, 2025

Member of the House of Representatives from the Pampanga's 4th District
- Incumbent
- Assumed office June 30, 2022
- Preceded by: Juan Pablo Bondoc
- In office June 30, 2004 – June 30, 2013
- Preceded by: Juan Pablo Bondoc
- Succeeded by: Juan Pablo Bondoc

Personal details
- Born: Anna York Cristina Puyat Bondoc; May 11, 1967 (age 59) Quezon City, Philippines
- Party: NUP (2026–present); KAMBILAN (local party; 2021–present)
- Other political affiliations: Nacionalista (2004–2026)
- Spouse: Jayson Sagum
- Relations: Juan Pablo Bondoc (brother); Gil Puyat (granduncle)
- Children: Benjamin Sagum
- Parents: Emigdio A. Bondoc (father); Margarita Puyat (mother)
- Education: University of the Philippines Manila (BS, MD)

Anna York Cristina Puyat Bondoc-Sagum (born May 11, 1967) is a Filipino pulmonologist and politician currently serving as a member of the House of Representatives of the Philippines representing Pampanga's 4th congressional district since June 30, 2022. She previously held the position from 2004 to 2013.

== Political career ==
In 2005, Bondoc was vice chairperson of the House Committee on Health, and in 2011, was vice chairperson of the House Committee on Appropriations.

In June 2012, Bondoc sponsored an amendment to the Expanded Breastfeeding Promotion Act of 2009. The proposed amendment revises the provisions rendering a time for breastfeeding babies during work hours. Breastfeeding mothers would no longer be paid for time spent breastfeeding, as they are under the current Milk Code, provided the breaks do not exceed 40 minutes during an eight-hour work period.

== Personal life ==
Bondoc is the daughter of former congressman Emigdio Bondoc, who along with her brother Juan Pablo, also represented the 4th district of Pampanga. She is married to Jayson Salas Sagum, a doctor and mayor of San Luis, Pampanga, since 2006.

House of Representatives of the Philippines
Preceded by Juan Pablo Bondoc	Member of the House of Representatives from Pampanga's 4th district 2022–present	Incumbent
Preceded by Juan Pablo Bondoc	Member of the House of Representatives from Pampanga's 4th district 2004–2013	Succeeded by Juan Pablo Bondoc
