= 2013 Pampanga local elections =

Philippine local election

2013 Pampanga gubernatorial election
- May 13, 2013
- Gubernatorial election
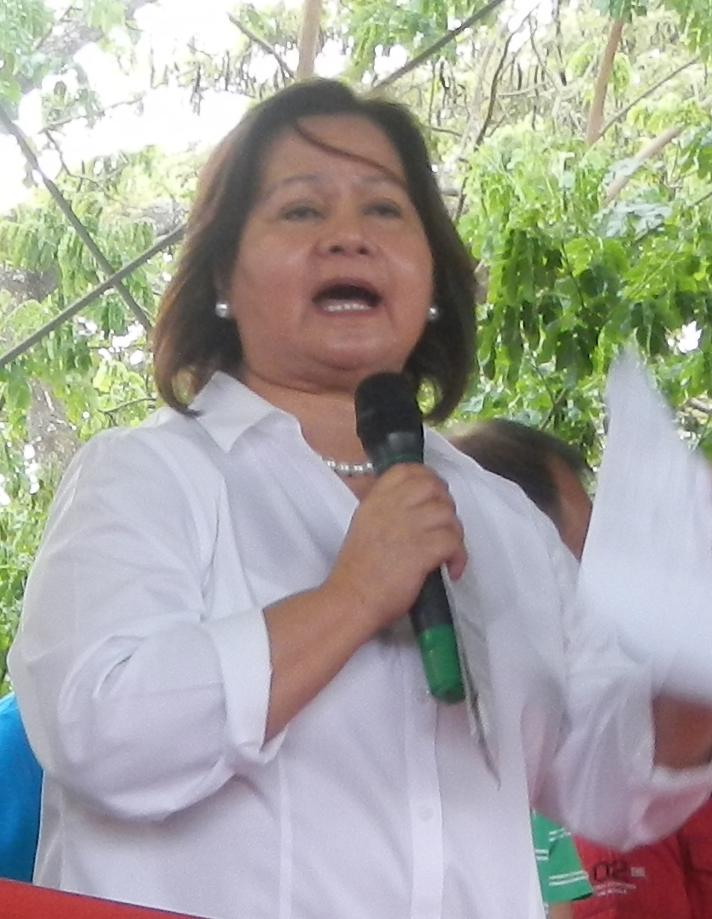

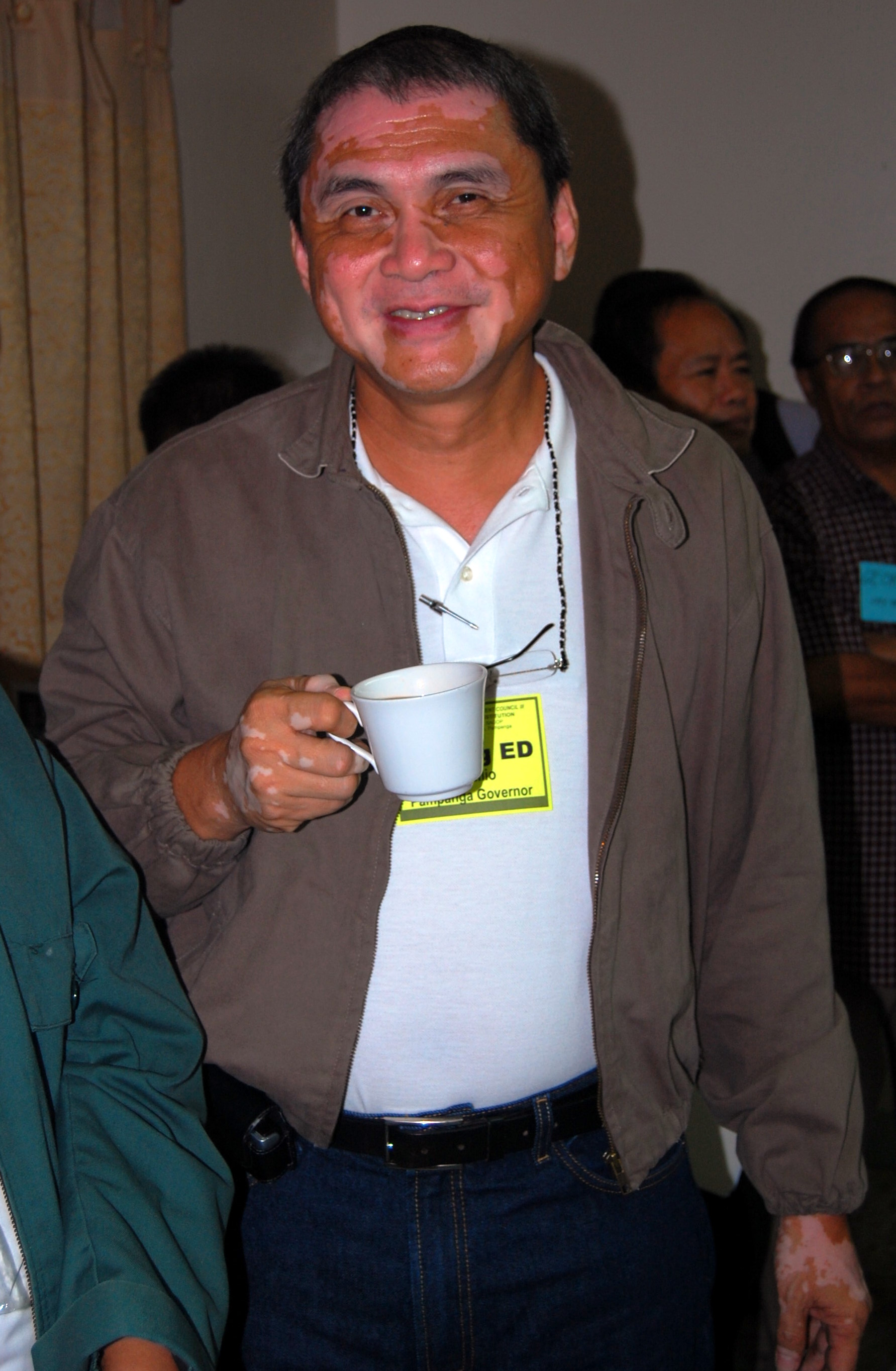
| Nominee | Lilia Pineda | Ed Panlilio |
| Party | KAMBILAN | Liberal |
| Running mate | Dennis Pineda (NPC) | Maria Amalia Tiglao |
| Popular vote | 517,307 | 141,658 |
| Percentage | 71.53 | 17.74 |
- Vice gubernatorial election
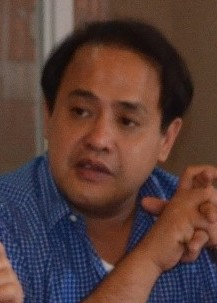
| Nominee | Dennis "Delta" Pineda | Maria Amalia Tiglao |
| Party | NPC | Liberal |
| Popular vote | 416,356 | 159,012 |
| Percentage | 57.11 | 22.17 |
Governor before election
Lilia Pineda
KAMBILAN
Elected Governor
Lilia Pineda
KAMBILAN

Local elections were held in the province of Pampanga on May 13, 2013, as part of the 2013 general election. Voters elected candidates for all local positions: a town mayor, vice mayor and town councilors, as well as members of the Sangguniang Panlalawigan, the vice-governor, governor and representatives for the four districts of Pampanga.

== Gubernatorial election ==
Party affiliations of the contestants were as stated in their certificates of candidacy.

Incumbent Governor Lilia Pineda is running for her reelection under to her local party KAMBILAN (a coalition composed of National Unity Party, Lakas–CMD, Nationalist People's Coalition and United Nationalist Alliance), her running mate is her son Dennis Pineda. Governor Lilia will face again former governor Ed Panlilio of Liberal Party, his running mate is lawyer Maria Amalia Tiglao.

Pampanga gubernatorial election
| Party | Candidate | Votes | % |
|---|---|---|---|
| KAMBILAN | Lilia Pineda | 507,207 | 71.53 |
| Liberal | Ed Panlilio | 125,761 | 17.74 |
| Independent | Joey Montemayor | 5,431 | 0.77 |
| Independent | Joe Ocampo | 3,540 | 0.50 |
| Invalid or blank votes | | 67,158 | 9.47 |
| Total votes | | 709,097 | 100.00 |

== Vice-gubernatorial election ==
Pampanga vice-gubernatorial election
| Party | Candidate | Votes | % |
|---|---|---|---|
| NPC | Dennis "Delta" Pineda | 404,947 | 57.11 |
| Liberal | Maria Amalia Tiglao | 157,207 | 22.17 |
| Invalid or blank votes | | 146,943 | 20.72 |
| Total votes | | 709,097 | 100.00 |

== Congressional Election ==
=== 1st District ===
Incumbent Carmelo Lazatin is not running instead he is running for mayor of Angeles City, Lakas–CMD thru the local party KAMBILAN nominates basketball coach and incumbent Vice-Governor Yeng Guiao. he will face former Congressman Francis Nepomuceno.

2013 Philippine House of Representatives election at Pampanga's 1st district
| Party | Candidate | Votes | % |
|---|---|---|---|
| KAMBILAN | Yeng Guiao | 96,433 | 51.82 |
| NPC | Francis Nepomuceno | 73,100 | 39.28 |
| Margin of victory | | 23,333 | 12.54% |
| Invalid or blank votes | | 16,551 | 8.89 |
| Total votes | | 186,084 | 100.00 |
| KAMBILAN gain from Lakas | | | |

=== 2nd District ===
Incumbent Gloria Macapagal Arroyo is running, despite her sickness and in-hospital arrest.

2013 Philippine House of Representatives election at Pampanga's 2nd district
| Party | Candidate | Votes | % |
|---|---|---|---|
| Lakas | Gloria Macapagal Arroyo | 149,344 | 78.24 |
| Liberal | Vivian Dabu | 16,238 | 8.51 |
| Independent | Charlie Chua | 1,966 | 1.03 |
| Independent | Josefina Leoncio | 1,271 | 0.67 |
| Margin of victory | | 133,106 | 69.73% |
| Invalid or blank votes | | 22,065 | 11.56 |
| Total votes | | 190,884 | 100.00 |
| Lakas hold | | | |

=== 3rd District ===
Aurelio Gonzales Jr. is the incumbent. he will facing-off incumbent San Fernando City Mayor Oscar Samson Rodriguez.

2013 Philippine House of Representatives election at Pampanga's 3rd district
| Party | Candidate | Votes | % |
|---|---|---|---|
| Liberal | Oscar Samson Rodriguez | 125,511 | 53.88 |
| NPC | Aurelio Gonzales Jr. | 95,437 | 40.97 |
| Margin of victory | | 30,074 | 12.91% |
| Invalid or blank votes | | 12,015 | 5.16 |
| Total votes | | 232,963 | 100.00 |
| Liberal gain from NPC | | | |

=== 4th District ===
Incumbent Anna York Bondoc is term limited; her brother Juan Pablo Bondoc is her party's nominee.

2013 Philippine House of Representatives election at Pampanga's 4th district
| Party | Candidate | Votes | % |
|---|---|---|---|
| Nacionalista | Juan Pablo Bondoc | 105,610 | 50.84 |
| NPC | Jerry Pelayo | 83,585 | 40.23 |
| Independent | Ramon Sediego | 830 | 0.40 |
| Margin of victory | | 22,025 | 10.60% |
| Invalid or blank votes | | 17,724 | 8.53 |
| Total votes | | 207,749 | 100.00 |
| Nacionalista hold | | | |

== Sangguniang Panlalawigan Election ==
=== 1st District ===
- City: Angeles City^{1}, Mabalacat City
- Municipalities: Magalang

Pampanga 1st District Sangguniang Panlalawigan election
| Party | Candidate | Votes | % |
|---|---|---|---|
| KAMBILAN | Cherry Manalo | 32,896 | 42.45 |
| KAMBILAN | Crisostomo Garbo | 30,745 | 39.67 |
| NPC | Jun Castro | 23,953 | 30.91 |
| Independent | Oscar Aurelio | 12,899 | 16.64 |
| Independent | Ruben Miranda | 9,988 | 12.89 |
| Independent | Jerry Basilio | 6,430 | 8.30 |
| Liberal | Ian Paulo Mejia | 2,682 | 3.46 |
| Total votes | | 77,501 | 100.00 |

=== 2nd District ===
- Municipalities: Floridablanca, Guagua, Lubao, Porac, Santa Rita, Sasmuan

Pampanga 2nd District Sangguniang Panlalawigan election
| Party | Candidate | Votes | % |
|---|---|---|---|
| KAMBILAN | Tonton Torres | 72,296 | 37.87 |
| KAMBILAN | Art Salalila | 66,612 | 34.90 |
| KAMBILAN | Salvador Dimson | 58,612 | 30.71 |
| Liberal | Leira Buan | 55,846 | 29.07 |
| Independent | Mike Mallari | 36,991 | 19.38 |
| PDP–Laban | Jong Vitug | 33,606 | 17.61 |
| Independent | Ludivico Muli | 29,782 | 15.60 |
| Liberal | Janet Ayen | 18,053 | 9.46 |
| Liberal | Nena Manabat | 8,878 | 4.65 |
| Total votes | | 198,884 | 100.00 |

=== 3rd District ===
- City: San Fernando City
- Municipalities: Arayat, Bacolor, Mexico, Santa Ana

Pampanga 3rd District Sangguniang Panlalawigan election
| Party | Candidate | Votes | % |
|---|---|---|---|
| KAMBILAN | Dinan Labung | 105,769 | 45.40 |
| Independent | Rosve Henson | 95,709 | 41.08 |
| Nacionalista | Teddy Tumang | 88,765 | 38.10 |
| KAMBILAN | Monina Laus | 78,151 | 33.55 |
| KAMBILAN | Trina Dizon | 77,601 | 33.31 |
| Independent | Roi Vinzon | 46,140 | 19.81 |
| Total votes | | 232,963 | 100.00 |

=== 4th District ===
- Municipalities: Apalit, Candaba, Macabebe, Masantol, Minalin, San Luis, San Simon, Santo Tomas

Pampanga 4th District Sangguniang Panlalawigan election
| Party | Candidate | Votes | % |
|---|---|---|---|
| KAMBILAN | Ricardo Yabut | 96,843 | 46.62 |
| Nacionalista | Nestor Tolentino | 72,799 | 35.04 |
| Independent | Nelson Calara | 48,533 | 23.37 |
| NPC | Kenneth Nunag | 45,263 | 21.79 |
| Liberal | Cecille Villegas | 10,151 | 4.89 |
| Liberal | Rodolfo Bravo | 3,164 | 1.52 |
| Total votes | | 207,749 | 100.00 |

== City and Municipal Election ==
=== 1st District ===
- City: Angeles City^{1}, Mabalacat City
- Municipalities: Magalang

==== Angeles ====
Angeles Mayoral Election
| Party | Candidate | Votes | % |
|---|---|---|---|
| PAK/ABE | Edgardo Pamintuan Sr. | 59,504 | 54.80 |
| Lakas | Carmelo Lazatin Sr. | 45,535 | 41.94 |
| Invalid or blank votes | | 3,544 | 3.26 |
| Total votes | | 108,583 | 100.00 |

==== Mabalacat City ====
Mabalacat City Mayoral Election
| Party | Candidate | Votes | % |
|---|---|---|---|
| KAMBILAN | Boking Morales | 27,453 | 49.31 |
| Independent | Noelito Castro | 23,458 | 42.13 |
| LDP | Jun Castro | 1,689 | 3.03 |
| Invalid or blank votes | | 3,077 | 5.53 |
| Total votes | | 55,677 | 100.00 |

==== Magalang ====
Magalang Mayoral Election
| Party | Candidate | Votes | % |
|---|---|---|---|
| KAMBILAN | Romy Pecson | 9,075 | 41.58 |
| NPC | Lyndon Cunanan | 4,876 | 22.34 |
| Liberal | Beth Pangan-Gonzales | 4,501 | 20.62 |
| Independent | Joey Lacson | 2,517 | 11.53 |
| Invalid or blank votes | | 855 | 3.93 |
| Total votes | | 21,824 | 100.00 |

=== 2nd District ===
- Municipalities: Floridablanca, Guagua, Lubao, Porac, Santa Rita, Sasmuan

==== Floridablanca ====
Floridablanca Mayoral Election
| Party | Candidate | Votes | % |
|---|---|---|---|
| KAMBILAN | Eddie Guerrero | 17,134 | 43.59 |
| UNA | Tito Mendiola | 12,802 | 32.57 |
| Independent | Sato Carlos | 5,041 | 12.82 |
| Independent | Arnigo Cura | 2,548 | 6.48 |
| Invalid or blank votes | | 1,785 | 4.54 |
| Total votes | | 39,310 | 100.00 |

==== Guagua ====
Guagua mayoralty election
| Party | Candidate | Votes | % |
|---|---|---|---|
| KAMBILAN | Ric Rivera | 20,539 | 47.85 |
| Liberal | Dante Torres | 20,115 | 47.21 |
| Invalid or blank votes | | 1,999 | 4.94 |
| Total votes | | 42,653 | 100.00 |

==== Lubao ====
Lubao Mayoral Election
| Party | Candidate | Votes | % |
|---|---|---|---|
| KAMBILAN | Mylyn Pineda-Cayabyab | 40,521 | 86.24 |
| Invalid or blank votes | | 6,465 | 14.76 |
| Total votes | | 46,986 | 100.00 |

==== Porac ====
Porac Mayoral Election
| Party | Candidate | Votes | % |
|---|---|---|---|
| KAMBILAN | Carling Dela Cruz | 25,393 | 67.28 |
| Invalid or blank votes | | 12,351 | 32.72 |
| Total votes | | 37,744 | 100.00 |

==== Santa Rita ====
Santa Rita mayoralty election
| Party | Candidate | Votes | % |
|---|---|---|---|
| KAMBILAN | Yolly Pineda | 10,301 | 82.57 |
| Independent | Erning Batac | 1,488 | 11.93 |
| Invalid or blank votes | | 687 | 5.51 |
| Total votes | | 12,476 | 100.00 |

==== Sasmuan ====
Sasmuan mayoralty election
| Party | Candidate | Votes | % |
|---|---|---|---|
| KAMBILAN | Mel Simbul | 6,699 | 48.08 |
| NPC | Nardo Velasco | 6,649 | 47.72 |
| Independent | Pidring Velasco | 93 | 0.67 |
| Invalid or blank votes | | 491 | 3.52 |
| Total votes | | 13,932 | 100.00 |

=== 3rd District ===
- City: San Fernando City
- Municipalities: Arayat, Bacolor, Mexico, Santa Ana

==== San Fernando City ====
San Fernando City mayoralty election
| Party | Candidate | Votes | % |
|---|---|---|---|
| Liberal | Edwin Santiago | 51,885 | 55.18 |
| PDP–Laban | Reynaldo Aquino | 37,969 | 40.38 |
| Invalid or blank votes | | 4,167 | 4.43 |
| Total votes | | 94,021 | 100.00 |

==== Arayat ====
Arayat mayoralty election
| Party | Candidate | Votes | % |
|---|---|---|---|
| Liberal | Bon Alejandrino | 18,385 | 48.70 |
| KAMBILAN | Larry Trinidad | 14,315 | 37.92 |
| Buklod | Benny Espino | 2,833 | 7.50 |
| Independent | Amado Santos | 679 | 1.80 |
| Invalid or blank votes | | 1,542 | 4.08 |
| Total votes | | 37,754 | 100.00 |

==== Bacolor ====
Bacolor mayoralty election
| Party | Candidate | Votes | % |
|---|---|---|---|
| Independent | Jomar Hizon | 16,815 | 53.90 |
| KAMBILAN | Romeo Dungca | 13,725 | 43.99 |
| Invalid or blank votes | | 657 | 2.11 |
| Total votes | | 31,197 | 100.00 |

==== Mexico ====
Mexico mayoralty election
| Party | Candidate | Votes | % |
|---|---|---|---|
| NPC | Roy Manalastas | 23,368 | 46.07 |
| Nacionalista | Alex Tumang | 22,127 | 43.62 |
| Liberal | Albert Dela Cruz | 3,405 | 6.71 |
| Independent | Ricardo Ocampo, Sr. | 107 | 0.21 |
| Invalid or blank votes | | 2,080 | 4.10 |
| Total votes | | 50,727 | 100.00 |

==== Santa Ana ====
Santa Ana mayoralty election
| Party | Candidate | Votes | % |
|---|---|---|---|
| KAMBILAN | Rommel Concepcion | 9,231 | 47.92 |
| Independent | Dennis Pangan | 5,629 | 29.22 |
| Independent | Norberto Gamboa | 3,843 | 19.95 |
| Invalid or blank votes | | 561 | 2.91 |
| Total votes | | 19,264 | 100.00 |

=== 4th District ===
- Municipalities: Apalit, Candaba, Macabebe, Masantol, Minalin, San Luis, San Simon, Santo Tomas

==== Apalit ====
Apalit mayoralty election
| Party | Candidate | Votes | % |
|---|---|---|---|
| NPC | Jun Tetangco | 22,340 | 74.59 |
| Invalid or blank votes | | 7,612 | 25.41 |
| Total votes | | 29,952 | 100.00 |

==== Candaba ====
Candaba mayoralty election
| Party | Candidate | Votes | % |
|---|---|---|---|
| Independent | Rene Maglanque | 13,247 | 28.45 |
| Nacionalista | Reynaldo Sagum | 12,959 | 27.83 |
| KAMBILAN | Pat Pelayo | 9,197 | 19.75 |
| Independent | Danilo Baylon | 9,153 | 19.66 |
| Invalid or blank votes | | 2,005 | 4.31 |
| Total votes | | 46,561 | 100.00 |

==== Macabebe ====
Macabebe Mayoral Election
| Party | Candidate | Votes | % |
|---|---|---|---|
| KAMBILAN | Annette Balgan | 18,043 | 69.90 |
| Invalid or blank votes | | 7,770 | 30.10 |
| Total votes | | 25,813 | 100.00 |

==== Masantol ====
Masantol mayoralty election
| Party | Candidate | Votes | % |
|---|---|---|---|
| Liberal | Dan Guintu | 12,353 | 66.50 |
| KAMBILAN | Paul Flores | 5,494 | 29.58 |
| Invalid or blank votes | | 729 | 3.92 |
| Total votes | | 18,576 | 100.00 |

==== Minalin ====
Minalin mayoralty election
| Party | Candidate | Votes | % |
|---|---|---|---|
| NPC | Edgar Flores | 9,315 | 51.46 |
| KAMBILAN | Arturo Naguit | 8,351 | 46.14 |
| Invalid or blank votes | | 435 | 2.40 |
| Total votes | | 18,101 | 100.00 |

==== San Luis ====
San Luis mayoralty election
| Party | Candidate | Votes | % |
|---|---|---|---|
| KAMBILAN | Asyong Macapagal | 12,678 | 53.70 |
| Liberal | Rey Santos | 10,398 | 44.04 |
| Invalid or blank votes | | 533 | 2.26 |
| Total votes | | 23,609 | 100.00 |

==== San Simon ====
San Simon mayoralty election
| Party | Candidate | Votes | % |
|---|---|---|---|
| KAMBILAN | Leonora "Nora" Wong | 13,014 | 50.14 |
| Liberal | Manuel "Maning" Bondoc | 12,217 | 47.07 |
| Invalid or blank votes | | 723 | 2.79 |
| Total votes | | 25,954 | 100.00 |

==== Santo Tomas ====
Santo Tomas mayoralty election
| Party | Candidate | Votes | % |
|---|---|---|---|
| KAMBILAN | Lito Naguit | 12,999 | 69.65 |
| NPC | Ninong Ronquillo | 5,918 | 30.85 |
| Independent | Regie Mallari | 48 | 0.25 |
| Invalid or blank votes | | 587 | 3.06 |
| Total votes | | 19,183 | 100.00 |
