= List of former presidents of the Philippines who pursued public office =

This is a complete list of former presidents of the Philippines who pursued public office after their presidential terms ended.

According to Article 7 Section 4 of the 1987 Constitution, the president "shall not be eligible for any reelection" and that, "no person who has succeeded as president and has served as such for more than four years shall be qualified for election to the same office at any time".

The previous 1973 Constitution provided no limit while the 1935 Constitution provided only one reelection. The term limit has prevented any incumbent president to run again for the same office; one exception was Gloria Macapagal Arroyo, who has served for 3 and a half years to serve the unfinished term of ousted President Joseph Estrada prior to her election in 2004.

== For executive posts ==
=== Presidency ===
This list only includes former presidents (those who are not in position anymore and seeking for a comeback) who ran again for president.

President	Previous term	Year of election (non-consecutive)	Party	Result	Ref.
Emilio Aguinaldo	1899–1901	1935	National Socialist	Lost	
José P. Laurel	1943–1945	1949	Nacionalista	Lost	
Joseph Estrada	1998–2001	2010	PMP	Lost	

=== Vice presidency ===
President	Previous term	Year of election (non-consecutive)	Party	Result	Ref.
Emilio Aguinaldo	1899–1901	1941	Modernist	Withdrawn	

=== Local government ===
President	Term	Position	Locality	Year of election	Party	Result	Ref.
Joseph Estrada	1998–2001	Mayor	Manila	2013	UNA	Won	
Joseph Estrada	1998–2001	Mayor	Manila	2016	PMP	Won	
Joseph Estrada	1998–2001	Mayor	Manila	2019	PMP	Lost	
Rodrigo Duterte	2016-2022	Mayor	Davao City	2025	Hugpong	Won (Note: Despite winning in the 2025 elections, Duterte did not serve his term as Mayor of Davao City due to his detention at The Hague that prevented him from taking oath of office during a prescribed period.)	

== For legislative posts ==
=== Senate ===
President	Term	Year of election	Party	Result	Ref.
José P. Laurel	1943–1945	1951	Nacionalista	Won	
Rodrigo Duterte	2016–2022	2022	PDP–Laban	Withdrawn	

=== House of Representatives ===
President	Term	Constituency		Year of election	Party	Result	Ref.
President	Term	Province	District	Year of election	Party	Result	Ref.
Gloria Macapagal Arroyo	2001–2010	Pampanga	2nd	2010	Lakas–Kampi	Won	
Gloria Macapagal Arroyo	2001–2010	Pampanga	2nd	2013	Lakas	Won	
Gloria Macapagal Arroyo	2001–2010	Pampanga	2nd	2016	Lakas	Unopposed	
Gloria Macapagal Arroyo	2001–2010	Pampanga	2nd	2022	Lakas	Unopposed	
Gloria Macapagal Arroyo	2001–2010	Pampanga	2nd	2025	Lakas	Unopposed	
