= 2016 Pampanga local elections =

Philippine election

2016 Pampanga gubernatorial election
- May 9, 2016
- Gubernatorial election
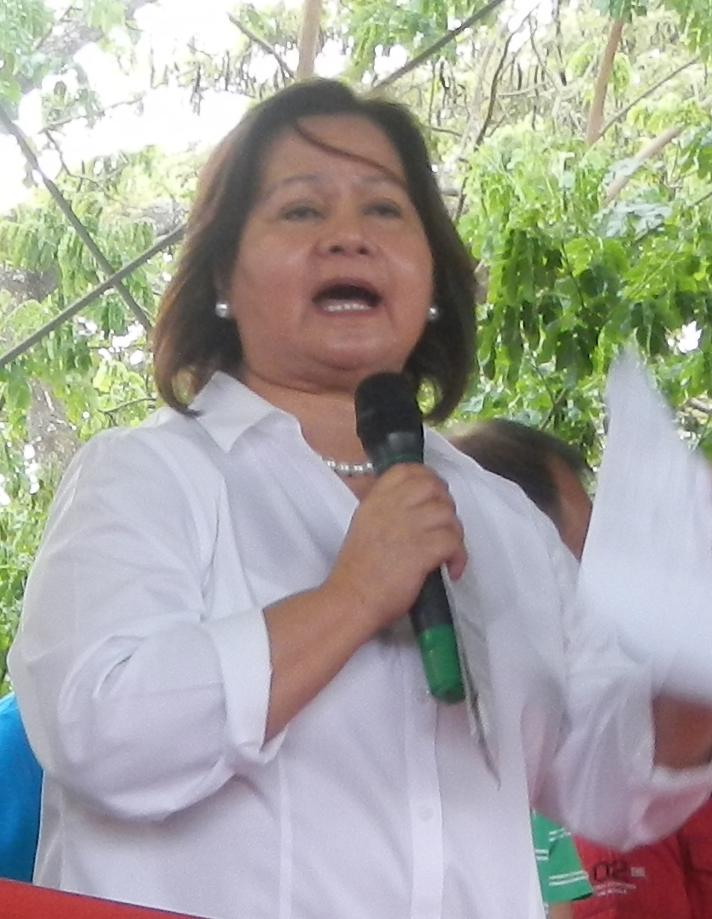
Nominee	Lilia Pineda
Party	KAMBILAN
Running mate	Dennis Pineda (NPC)
Popular vote	736,816
Percentage	100.00
- Vice gubetnatorial election
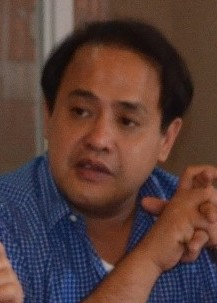
Nominee	Dennis "Delta" Pineda
Party	NPC
Popular vote	649,425
Percentage	100.00
Governor before election
Lilia Pineda
KAMBILAN
Elected Governor
Lilia Pineda
KAMBILAN

Local elections were held in the Province of Pampanga on May 9, 2016, as part of the 2016 general election. Voters selected candidates for all local positions: a town mayor, vice mayor and town councilors, as well as members of the Sangguniang Panlalawigan, the vice-governor, governor and representatives for the four districts of Pampanga.

== Gubernatorial election ==
Incumbent Governor Lilia Pineda ran for her final term unopposed.

Pampanga gubernatorial election
Party	Candidate	Votes	%
KAMBILAN	Lilia Pineda	736,816	
Total votes			
KAMBILAN hold			

== Vice gubernatorial election ==
Incumbent Vice Governor Dennis Pineda ran for reelection unopposed.

Pampanga Vice gubernatorial election
Party	Candidate	Votes	%
NPC	Dennis "Delta" Pineda	649,425	
Total votes			
NPC hold			

== Congressional election ==
=== 1st District ===
Yeng Guiao was the incumbent. He faced Jon Lazatin, son of former Representative Carmelo "Tarzan" Lazatin Sr. and the one emerging from the grass roots; a former Clark Development Corporation's multi-awarded employee Edwin "Win" Bacay who uniquely focus his platforms on urban poor and poverty solutions.

2016 Philippine House of Representatives election at Pampanga's 1st district
Party	Candidate	Votes	%
Lingap Lugud	Carmelo "Jon" Lazatin II	127,762	53.94
Liberal	Joseller Guiao	106,086	44.78
Independent	Edwin Bacay	1,828	0.77
PBM	Juan Pagaran	1,203	0.51
Total votes		236,879	100

=== 2nd District ===
Incumbent Gloria Macapagal Arroyo ran for her last term unopposed.

2016 Philippine House of Representatives election at Pampanga's 2nd district
Party	Candidate	Votes	%
Lakas	Gloria Macapagal Arroyo	190,043	
Total votes			
Lakas hold			

=== 3rd District ===
Oscar Samson Rodriguez was the incumbent. He faced-off against former congressman Aurelio Gonzales Jr.

2016 Philippine House of Representatives election at Pampanga's 3rd district
Party	Candidate	Votes	%
NPC	Aurelio Gonzales Jr.	137,786	
Liberal	Oscar Samson Rodriguez	123,935	
Independent	Pol Quiwa	3,260	
Independent	Amado Santos	3,069	
Total votes			

=== 4th District ===
Juan Pablo Bondoc was the incumbent.

2016 Philippine House of Representatives election at Pampanga's 4th district
Party	Candidate	Votes	%
Nacionalista	Juan Pablo Bondoc	148,641	
NPC	Jun Tetangco	85,643	
Total votes			

== Sangguniang Panlalawigan Election ==
=== 1st District ===
- City: Angeles City^{1}, Mabalacat City
- Municipalities: Magalang

Pampanga 1st District Sangguniang Panlalawigan election
Party	Candidate	Votes	%
KAMBILAN	Cherry Manalo	58,220	
Independent	Benny Jocson	50,146	
KAMBILAN	Liza Pineda	34,874	
Independent	Edgar Halili	28,581	
UNA	Roger Santos	19,927	
Total votes			

=== 2nd District ===
- Municipalities: Floridablanca, Guagua, Lubao, Porac, Santa Rita, Sasmuan

Pampanga 2nd District Sangguniang Panlalawigan election
Party	Candidate	Votes	%
KAMBILAN	Art Salalila	111,112	
KAMBILAN	Tonton Torres	109,698	
KAMBILAN	Salvador Dimson Jr.	102,176	
Total votes			

=== 3rd District ===
- City: San Fernando City
- Municipalities: Arayat, Bacolor, Mexico, Santa Ana

Pampanga 3rd District Sangguniang Panlalawigan election
Party	Candidate	Votes	%
KAMBILAN	Dinan Labung	155,621	
KAMBILAN	Rosve Henson	149,292	
KAMBILAN	Jun Canlas	110,556	
Independent	Raul Macalino	102,920	
Independent	Rudencio Gonzales	70,041	
Total votes			

=== 4th District ===
- Municipalities: Apalit, Candaba, Macabebe, Masantol, Minalin, San Luis, San Simon, Santo Tomas

Pampanga 4th District Sangguniang Panlalawigan election
Party	Candidate	Votes	%
UNA	Nelson Calara	83,290	
Nacionalista	Pol Balingit	78,790	
KAMBILAN	Mark Louie Arceo	69,627	
Nacionalista	Alvin Ignacio	64,934	
KAMBILAN	Gerome Tubig	52,419	
Independent	Edgar Puno	13,316	
Total votes			

== City and Municipal Election ==
=== 1st District ===
- City: Angeles City^{1}, Mabalacat City
- Municipalities: Magalang

==== Angeles ====
Edgardo Pamintuan Sr. was the incumbent, and was running for his final term. He was pitted against former Senator and former Pampanga Governor Lito Lapid and incumbent Vice Mayor Maria Vicenta Vega-Cabigting (who was on her final term, thus unable to seek re-election for that post).

Angeles City Mayoral election
Party	Candidate	Votes	%
PAK/ABE	Edgardo Pamintuan Sr.	76,540	56.6%
Lingap Lugud	Lito Lapid	45,710	33.8%
Independent	Maria Vicenta Vega-Cabigting	12,864	9.5%
Total votes			

==== Mabalacat City ====
Mabalacat City Mayoral election
Party	Candidate	Votes	%
Aksyon	Marino Morales	40,174	53.9%
NPC	Crisostomo Garbo	17,710	23.8%
Independent	Noel Castro	10,788	14.5%
Independent	Pyra Lucas	5,807	7.8%
Total votes		74,479	100.00

==== Magalang ====
Magalang Mayoral election
Party	Candidate	Votes	%
NPC	Malu Paras-Lacson	204,342	
KAMBILAN	Romulo Pecson	198,203	
Independent	Joel Cunanan	4,627	
Total votes			

=== 2nd District ===
- Municipalities: Floridablanca, Guagua, Lubao, Porac, Santa Rita, Sasmuan

==== Floridablanca ====
Floridablanca Mayoral election
Party	Candidate	Votes	%
Liberal	Richard Lee Carlos VI		
Independent	Arnigo Cura		
KAMBILAN	Leck Guerrero		
Lakas	Darwin Manalansan		
PDP–Laban	Tito Mendiola		
Total votes			

==== Guagua ====
Guagua Mayoral election
Party	Candidate	Votes	%
Liberal	Dante Torres	18,240	
KAMBILAN	Anthony Twaño	15,580	
PLM	Noynoy Santiago	4,586	
PDP–Laban	Mike Mallari	3,700	
Aksyon	Liza Guilas	2,589	
Total votes			

==== Lubao ====
Lubao Mayoral election
Party	Candidate	Votes	%
KAMBILAN	Mylyn Pineda-Cayabyab	49,545	
Total votes			
KAMBILAN hold			

==== Porac ====
Porac Mayoral election
Party	Candidate	Votes	%
KAMBILAN	Carling Dela Cruz		
NPC	Michael Tapang		
Total votes			

==== Santa Rita ====
Santa Rita Mayoral election
Party	Candidate	Votes	%
Independent	Alex Cruz		
KAMBILAN	Dagi Salalia		
Total votes			

==== Sasmuan ====
Sasmuan Mayoral election
Party	Candidate	Votes	%
Independent	Amador Ducut		
NPC	Lalah Leoncio		
KAMBILAN	Nardo Velasco		
Total votes			

=== 3rd District ===
- City: San Fernando City
- Municipalities: Arayat, Bacolor, Mexico, Santa Ana

==== San Fernando City ====
San Fernando City Mayoral election
Party	Candidate	Votes	%
Liberal	Edwin Santiago	92,682	
Total votes			
Liberal hold			

==== Arayat ====
Arayat Mayoral election
Party	Candidate	Votes	%
Liberal	Bon Alejandrino	31,964	
NPC	Luis Espino	17,096	
Total votes			

==== Bacolor ====
Bacolor Mayoral election
Party	Candidate	Votes	%
Liberal	Jomar Hizon	17,837	
KAMBILAN	Buddy Dungca	17,724	
Total votes			

==== Mexico ====
Mexico Mayoral election
Party	Candidate	Votes	%
Liberal	Teddy Tumang	31,541	
KAMBILAN	Roy Manalastas	28,879	
Total votes			

==== Santa Ana ====
Santa Ana Mayoral election
Party	Candidate	Votes	%
KAMBILAN	Rommel Concepcion		
UNA	Jerome Gaddi		
Liberal	Norberto Gamboa		
Independent	Restituto Montoya		
Total votes			

=== 4th District ===
- Municipalities: Apalit, Candaba, Macabebe, Masantol, Minalin, San Luis, San Simon, Santo Tomas

==== Apalit ====
Apalit Mayoral election
Party	Candidate	Votes	%
Independent	Jaime Macapagal		
NPC	Peter Nucom		
Nacionalista	Bay Tolentino		
Total votes			

==== Candaba ====
Candaba Mayoral election
Party	Candidate	Votes	%
Independent	Danilo Baylon	23,725	
Liberal	Rene Maglanque	23,036	
UNA	Babes Evangelista	3,026	
Independent	Boy Baylon	1,169	
Total votes			

==== Macabebe ====
Macabebe Mayoral election
Party	Candidate	Votes	%
KAMBILAN	Annette Balgan		
Nacionalista	Leonardo Flores		
Total votes			

==== Masantol ====
Masantol Mayoral election
Party	Candidate	Votes	%
UNA	Peter Flores		
Liberal	Dan Guintu		
Total votes			

==== Minalin ====
Minalin Mayoral election
Party	Candidate	Votes	%
Liberal	Querolico Daag		
KAMBILAN	Edgar Flores		
Total votes			

==== San Luis ====
San Luis Mayoral election
Party	Candidate	Votes	%
KAMBILAN	Venancio Macapagal		
Total votes			
KAMBILAN hold			

==== San Simon ====
San Simon Mayoral election
Party	Candidate	Votes	%
Liberal	Manuel Bondoc		
Nacionalista	Sonny Simbulan		
KAMBILAN	Leonora Wong		
Total votes			

==== Santo Tomas ====
Santo Tomas Mayoral election
Party	Candidate	Votes	%
Independent	Regino Mallari	1,000	
KAMBILAN	Matias Pineda		
Nacionalista	John Sambo		
Independent	Fausto Sengson		
Total votes			
