= Jose Montemayor Jr. =

Filipino lawyer and cardiologist

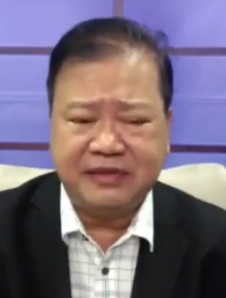
- Montemayor at an e-rally, 2022

Personal details
- Born: Jose Cabrera Montemayor Jr. February 17, 1962 (age 64) Sexmoán, Pampanga, Philippines
- Party: Independent (2001–2006; 2007–2021; 2024–present)
- Other political affiliations: DPP (2021–2024); Liberal (2006–2007)
- Education: Far Eastern University; Philippine Law School
- Occupation: Lawyer, doctor, politician

Jose "Joey" Cabrera Montemayor Jr. (born February 17, 1962) is a Filipino cardiologist, lawyer, and politician. He is known for his career in medicine and law, as well as his involvement in politics, particularly his candidacy in the 2022 Philippine presidential election and the 2025 Philippine Senate election. In addition, he ran in three local elections, particularly the 2001 Pampanga gubernatorial elections, gaining 3rd place; the 2007 Pampanga House of Representatives elections, gaining 10,490 votes and 2nd place; and the 2013 Pampanga gubernatorial elections, gaining 5,431 votes and 3rd place. If elected, Montemayor would have aimed for a "Christ-centered" governance against same-sex unions, abortion, divorce, and the death penalty.

== Early life and career ==
Montemayor was born in Sexmoán, Pampanga, on February 17, 1962, to Jose Montemayor Sr., a former regional trial court judge, and Juliana Cabrera, a former municipal treasurer. In elementary, he attended the Santo Tomas Elementary School from 1968 to 1974. He had his secondary education at the Guagua National Colleges from 1974 to 1978. Montemayor enrolled in the Far Eastern University, receiving the Bachelor of Science in Medical Technology and the Doctor of Medicine degrees from 1978 to 1982. At the same university, he became a Doctor of Medicine after studying from 1982 to 1986. Furthermore, he had a Bachelor of Laws from the Philippine Law School in 2004 and a Master of Divinity from the Farcorners International Theological Seminary in 2016. Montemayor, in an interview with the Philippine Daily Inquirer, said presidency was a dream since grade school and that he obtained his degrees to prepare for it.

Montemayor works as the Legal Counsel and Legal Officer of the Philippine Heart Center, the Consultant in Internal Medicine and Clinical Cardiology at the National Kidney and Transplant Institute. He worked as a Consultant in Clinical Cardiology and Interventional Cardiology at the St. Luke's Medical Center, the Philippine Heart Center, and the National Kidney Institute. He taught as a professor of law and a faculty member at the University of Manila, San Sebastian College, Polytechnic University of the Philippines, and the Philippine Christian University; a professor at the Palawan State University and San Beda College. Furthermore, he is a special consultant of the Legislative Committee of the Philippine Heart Association and the legal counsel of the Philippine Heart Center. He served as a president and member of the board of trustees in the Philippine Society of Cardiac Catheterization and Interventions, board member of the Asia-Pacific Society for Interventional Cardiology, assistant secretary general of the Philippine Medical Association, and vice president of the Philippine Association of Government Corporate Lawyers. Montemayor is married to Nehbolyn Rivera and has two children named Socorro and Jose Carlos.

== Political candidacies ==
=== Local ===
During the 2001 gubernatorial elections, Montemayor ran for the Pampanga governorship as an independent candidate, competing for the votes with fellow candidates Lito Lapid of Lakas-NUCD, Ananias Canlas Jr. of Buklod Capampangan, and Marcelino Manalansan of Pwersa ng Masang Pilipino. He ran as a representative for Pampanga's 2nd congressional district in the 2007 Philippine House of Representatives elections under the Liberal Party, running against incumbent Mikey Arroyo. According to Aries Rulfo and Emily Green of GMA Network, he waged a "lonely battle" against Arroyo, riding in a vehicle without any campaign banners accompanied by six supporters. His campaign manager was a Protestant pastor. Rulfo and Green said that "residents politely welcome him with a smile, but one could sense they are wondering who that man who just offered a handshake was." Arroyo stated that he was "practically unopposed," while a survey showed that four percent of voters would vote for Montemayor. According to the Philippine Center for Investigative Journalism, he was likely to vote for the impeachment of Gloria Macapagal Arroyo. Montemayor lost with 10,490 votes. In 2013, Montemayor once again ran for Pampanga governor independently, this time facing Lilia Pineda of Kambilan, Eddie Panlilio of the Liberal Party, and independent candidate Joe Ocampo. Montemayor placed third, garnering 5,431 votes.

=== National ===
In the 2016 Philippine presidential election, he attempted to run, eventually being declared a nuisance candidate. He ran for president in the 2022 Philippine presidential election under the Democratic Party of the Philippines; his running mate was Rizalito David. He held a proclamation rally at a condominium unit in Pasay on February 9, with prayer and worship songs. During a 2022 debate between presidential candidates, Montemayor falsely claimed that COVID-19 vaccines expose people to infection, citing a non-existent study according to Vera Files. Montemayor said that he would protect the rights of the OFW (Overseas Filipino Workers) and will provide legal and medical assistance to the workers, claiming that he will eliminate corruption and COVID-19. Montemayor says that he will remove Operation Tokhang (Tokhang meaning "knock and plead" in Cebuano) because of certain instances of death, stating that he will address the issue some other way. In an interview with the Philippine Daily Inquirer, he said that he and David were aiming for a "Christ-centered" governance, opposing same-sex unions, abortion, divorce and the death penalty. He lost, placing 10th or last, receiving 60,592 votes or 0.11% of the ballot. His vice presidential candidate also got last place, gaining 9th with 56,711 votes, or 0.11% of the ballot. Montemayor only spent P100,000 from his pocket with no report of donations. He ran for senator in 2025 as an independent candidate, filing his certificate of candidacy on October 1, 2024. "Well, even before, I had a big chance [to win]. But now, I have a bigger advantage because I am now known," Montemayor said. In November, the Philippine Commission on Elections (COMELEC) declared 117 nuisance candidates, 14 of whom filed a motion for reconsideration. In December, the COMELEC announced 66 names on their final list; Montemayor was included. He lost, placing 52nd with 671,818 votes. Montemayor, according to his Commission on Elections Statement of Contribution and Expenditures, did not have any donations and contributions or expenditures.

== Electoral history ==
Electoral history of Jose Montemayor Jr.
Year	Office	Party	Votes received				Result
Year	Office	Party	Total	%	P.	Swing	Result
2001	Governor of Pampanga	Independent	5,579	1.03%	3rd	—N/a	Lost
2013	Governor of Pampanga	Independent	5,431	0.83%	3rd	—N/a	Lost
2007	Representative (Pampanga–2nd)	Liberal	10,490	7.54%	2nd	—N/a	Lost
2022	President of the Philippines	DPP	60,592	0.11%	10th	—N/a	Lost
2025	Senator of the Philippines	Independent	671,818	1.17%	52nd	—N/a	Lost
