= Esmeralda Pineda =

Filipino politician and businesswoman (born 1972)

- Official portrait, 2022

25th Mayor of Lubao
- Incumbent
- Assumed office June 30, 2019
- Vice Mayor: Jay Montemayor
- Preceded by: Mylyn Pineda-Cayabyab

Personal details
- Born: Esmeralda Garcia Pineda; June 28, 1972 (age 54) Manila, Philippines
- Party: KAMBILAN (2018–present)
- Spouse: Omar Victorino (died 2001)
- Parent(s): Bong Pineda (father); Lilia Pineda (mother)
- Relatives: Dennis Pineda (brother); Mylyn Pineda-Cayabyab (sister)
- Occupation: Politician, businesswoman

Esmeralda "Esmie" Garcia Pineda (born June 28, 1972) is a Filipino politician and businesswoman. She is currently serving as 25th mayor of Lubao since 2019.

== Political career ==
In 2019, Pineda entered politics when she was elected as mayor of Lubao succeeded her sister Mylyn.

== Personal life ==
Pineda was married to Omar Victorino and has a son Jayson Victorino, councilor of Lubao since 2025.
