= 2025 Pampanga local elections =

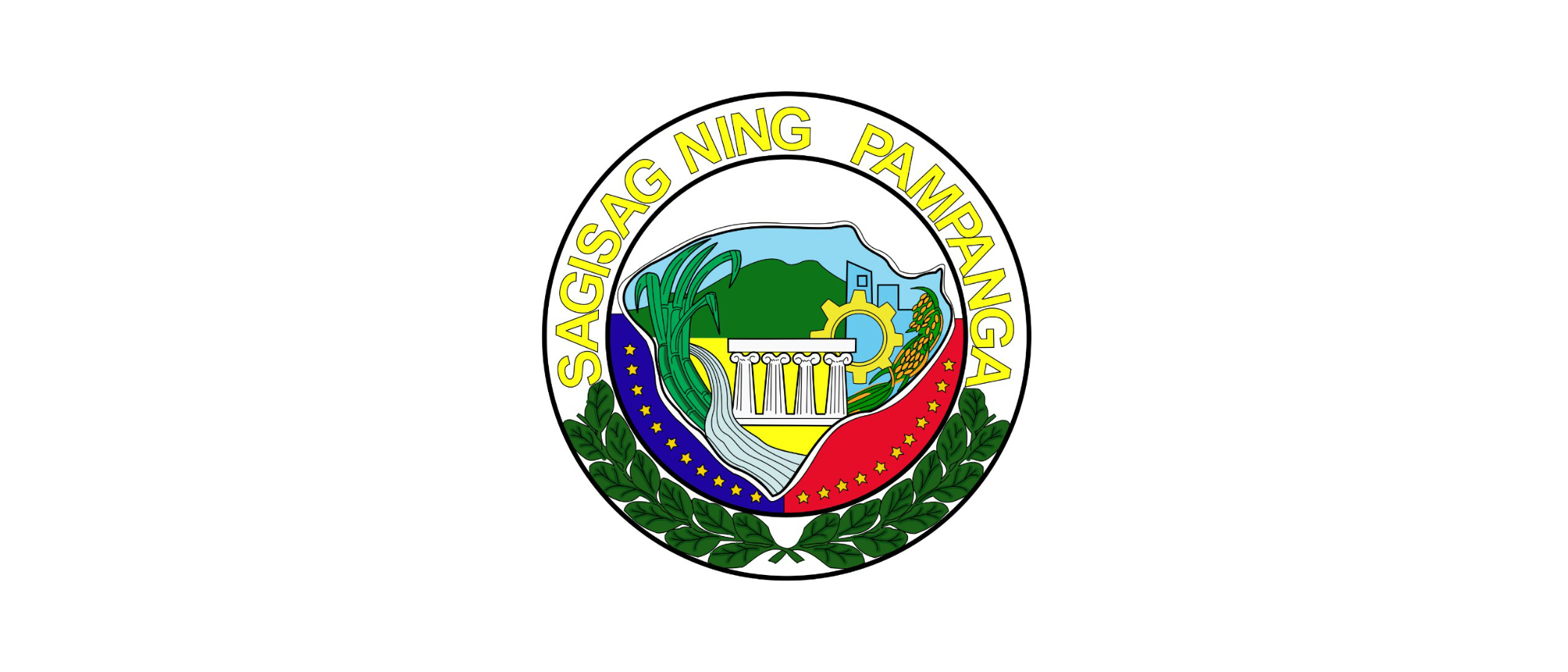
- May 12, 2025
- Gubernatorial election
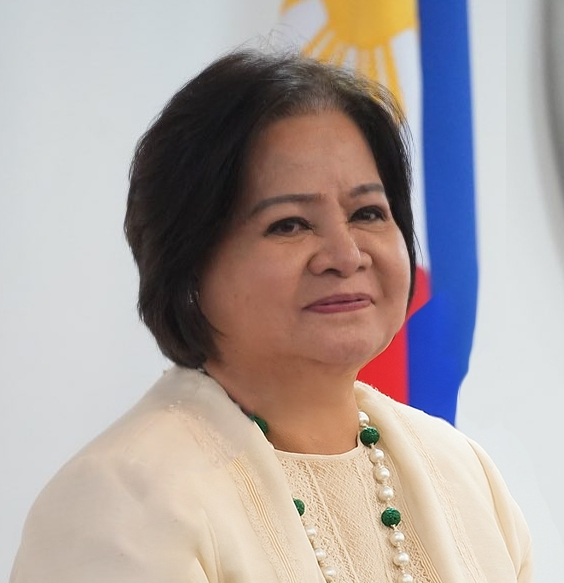

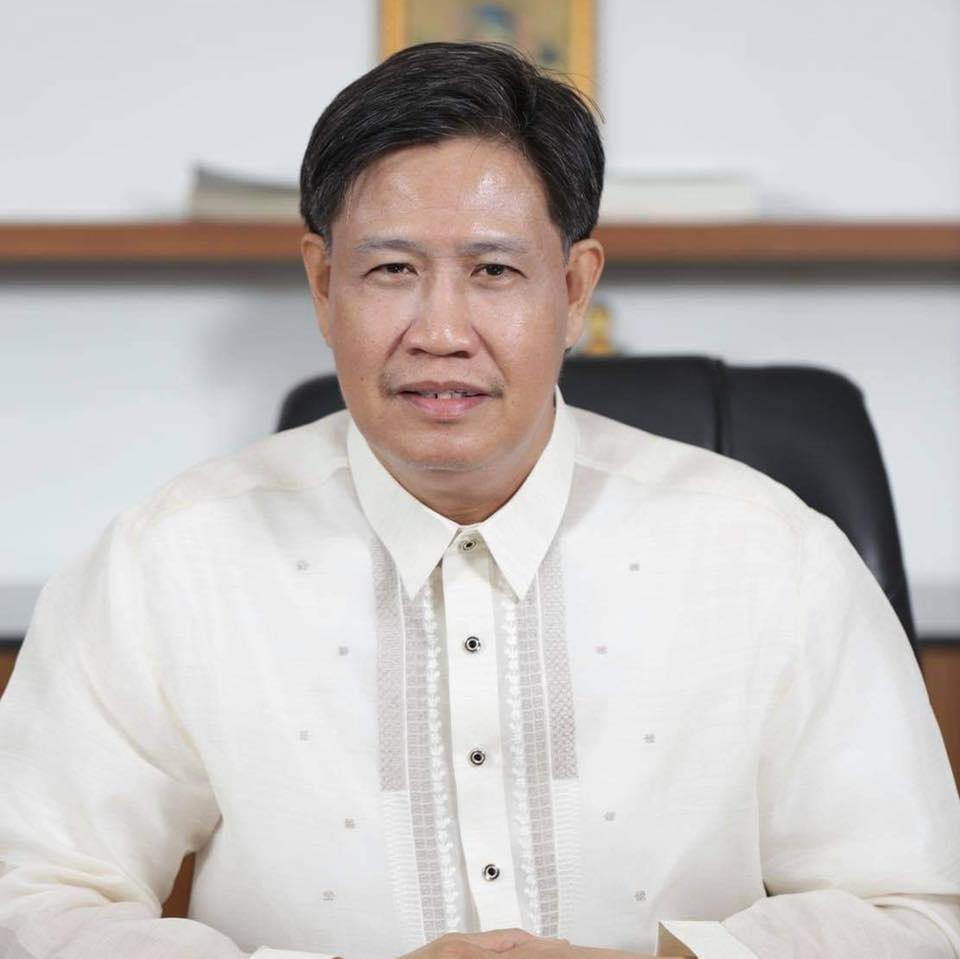
Candidate	Lilia Pineda	Danilo Baylon
Party	Kambilan	Independent
Running mate	Dennis Pineda	Eddie Panlilio
Popular vote	709,694	476,642
Percentage	59.48%	39.95%
Governor before election
Dennis Pineda
NPC
Elected Governor
Lilia Pineda
Kambilan
- Vice gubernatorial election
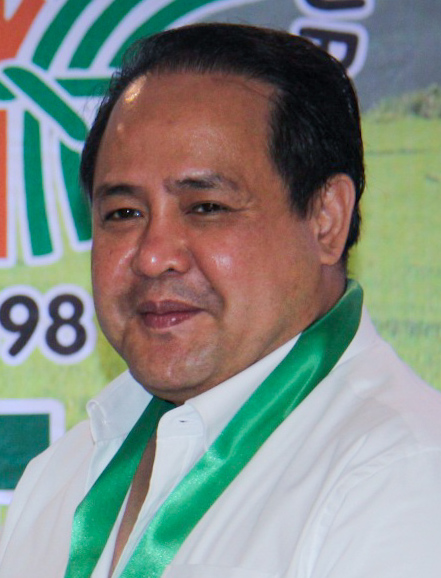

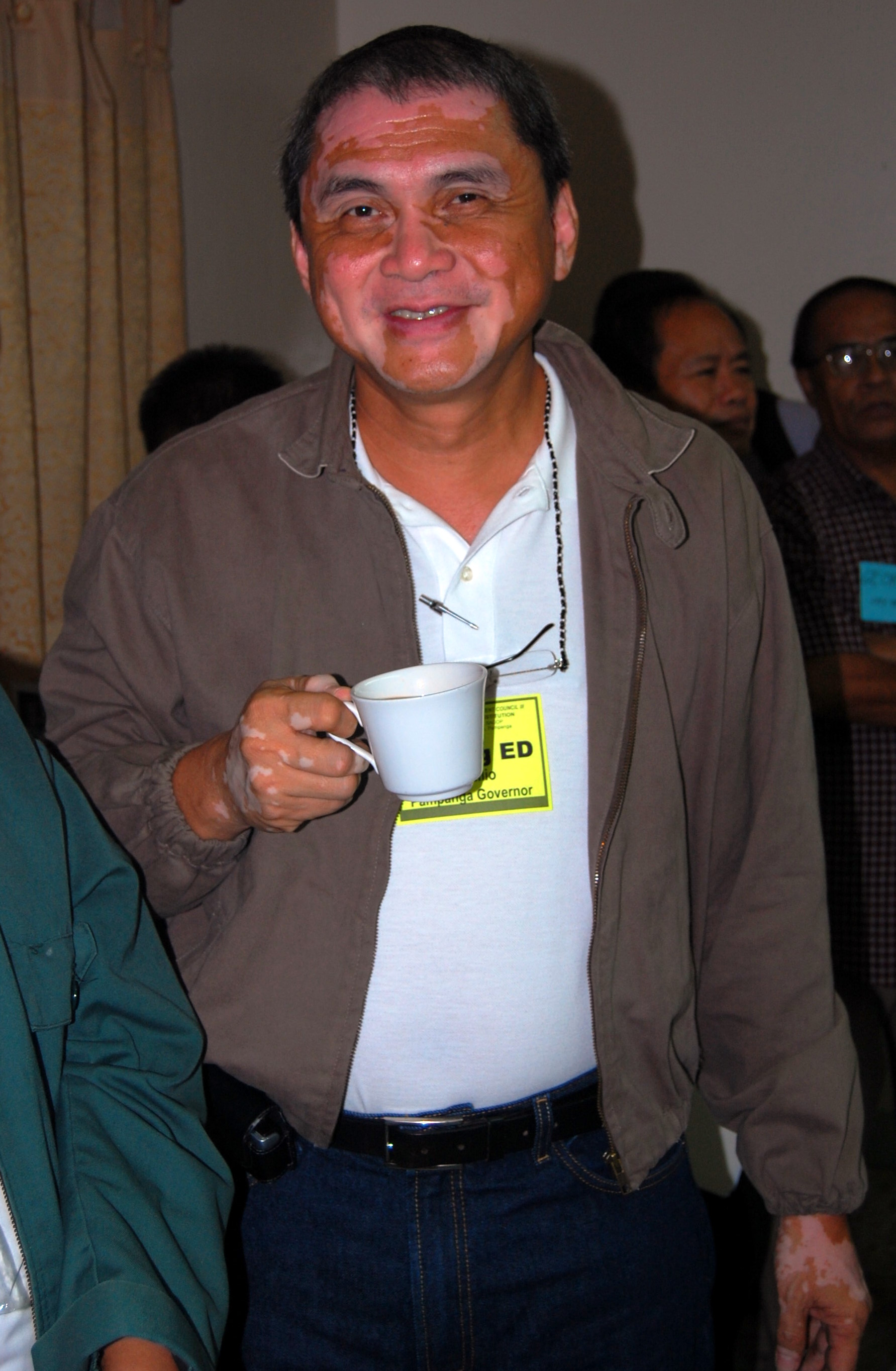
Candidate	Dennis Pineda	Eddie Panlilio
Party	NPC	Liberal
Popular vote	751,077	387,056
Percentage	65.99%	34.01%
Vice Governor before election
Lilia Pineda
Kambilan
Elected Vice Governor
Dennis Pineda
NPC
- Provincial Board election
- 10 out of 13 seats in the Pampanga Provincial Board; 7 seats needed for a majority
Party	Vote %	Seats	+/–
Kambilan	51.99	7	+3
Lakas	21.16	2	0
Nacionalista	5.70	0	−1
NPC	0.00	0	−2
Aksyon	0.00	0	−1
Independent	21.15	1	+1
This lists parties that won seats. See the complete results below.

Local elections were held in Pampanga on May 12, 2025, as part of the 2025 Philippine general election. Pampanga voters will elect a governor, a vice governor, and 10 out of 13 members of the Pampanga Provincial Board.

== Governor ==
Incumbent Dennis Pineda (Nationalist People's Coalition) is running for vice governor of Pampanga. Pineda was re-elected with 58.95% of the vote in 2022.

=== Candidates ===
The following candidates are included in the ballot:

No.	Candidate	Party
1	Danilo Baylon	Independent
2	Lilia Pineda	Kambilan
3	Amado Santos	Independent

=== Results ===
Candidate	Party	Votes	%
Lilia Pineda	Kambilan	709,694	59.48
Danilo Baylon	Independent	476,642	39.95
Amado Santos	Independent	6,864	0.58
Total		1,193,200	100.00

== Vice governor ==
Incumbent Lilia Pineda (Kambilan) is running for governor of Pampanga. Pineda was re-elected unopposed in 2022.

=== Candidates ===
The following candidates are included in the ballot:

No.	Candidate	Party
1	Eddie Panlilio	Liberal Party
2	Dennis Pineda	Nationalist People's Coalition

=== Results ===
Candidate	Party	Votes	%
Dennis Pineda	Nationalist People's Coalition	751,077	65.99
Eddie Panlilio	Liberal Party	387,056	34.01
Total		1,138,133	100.00

== Provincial Board ==
The Pampanga Provincial Board is composed of 12 councilors, 10 of whom are elected.

=== Retiring and term-limited board members ===
The following board members are retiring:

- Win-win Garbo (Nationalist People's Coalition, 1st provincial district), ran for vice mayor of Mabalacat and lost.
- Mica Gonzales (Lakas–CMD, 3rd provincial district), ran for the House of Representatives in Pampanga's 3rd legislative district and won.
- Mylyn Pineda-Cayabyab (Kambilan, 2nd provincial district), ran for mayor of San Fernando and lost.

The following board members are term-limited:

- Jun Canlas (Aksyon Demokratiko, 3rd provincial district), running for the House of Representatives as a nominee of Nanay party-list.
- Benny Jocson (Nationalist People's Coalition, 1st provincial district), running for the Mabalacat City Council.

=== Overview ===
Party	Votes	%	Seats
Kambilan	957,019	51.99	7
Lakas–CMD	389,553	21.16	2
Nacionalista Party	104,887	5.70	0
Independent	389,346	21.15	1
Ex officio seats			3
Total	1,840,805	100.00	13

=== 1st provincial district ===
Pampanga's 1st provincial district consists of the same area as Pampanga's 1st legislative district, excluding Angeles City. Two board members are elected from this provincial district.

==== Candidates ====
The following candidates are included in the ballot:

No.	Candidate	Party
1	Joel Cruz	Independent
2	Christian Halili	Kambilan
3	Cherry Manalo	Kambilan
4	Ver Medardo Orquia	Independent
5	Willy Villavicencio	Lakas–CMD

==== Results ====
Candidate	Party	Votes	%
Cherry Manalo	Kambilan	94,351	33.52
Christian Halili	Kambilan	81,808	29.07
Joel Cruz	Independent	68,496	24.34
Willy Villavicencio	Lakas–CMD	31,673	11.25
Ver Medardo Orquia	Independent	5,129	1.82
Total		281,457	100.00

=== 2nd provincial district ===
Pampanga's 2nd provincial district consists of the same area as Pampanga's 2nd legislative district. Three board members are elected from this provincial district.

==== Candidates ====
The following candidates are included in the ballot:

No.	Candidate	Party
1	Wardy Chu Jr.	Independent
2	Fritzie David-Dizon (incumbent)	Kambilan
3	Loreto delos Santos Jr.	Independent
4	Sajid Eusoof (incumbent)	Kambilan
5	Claire Lim	Kambilan

==== Results ====
Candidate	Party	Votes	%
Fritzie David-Dizon (incumbent)	Kambilan	158,100	30.42
Sajid Eusoof (incumbent)	Kambilan	151,018	29.06
Claire Lim	Kambilan	118,709	22.84
Wardy Chu Jr.	Independent	55,376	10.66
Loreto delos Santos Jr.	Independent	36,458	7.02
Total		519,661	100.00

=== 3rd provincial district ===
Pampanga's 3rd provincial district consists of the same area as Pampanga's 3rd legislative district. Three board members are elected from this provincial district.

==== Candidates ====
The following candidates are included in the ballot:

No.	Candidate	Party
1	Alfie Bonifacio	Kambilan
2	Rouel Fausto	Independent
3	Lucky Labung (incumbent)	Kambilan
4	Shiwen Lim	Independent
5	Raul Macalino	Kambilan
6	Mymy Mercado	Lakas–CMD

==== Results ====
Candidate	Party	Votes	%
Mymy Mercado	Lakas–CMD	194,719	25.56
Lucky Labung (incumbent)	Kambilan	189,388	24.86
Shiwen Lim	Independent	136,100	17.86
Raul Macalino	Kambilan	123,542	16.22
Alfie Bonifacio	Kambilan	86,321	11.33
Rouel Fausto	Independent	31,828	4.18
Total		761,898	100.00

=== 4th provincial district ===
Pampanga's 4th provincial district consists of the same area as Pampanga's 4th legislative district. Two board members are elected from this provincial district.

==== Candidates ====
The following candidates are included in the ballot:

No.	Candidate	Party
1	Vince Calara (incumbent)	Lakas–CMD
2	Sky Maglanque	Lakas–CMD
3	Kaye Naguit	Kambilan
4	Nestor Tolentino	Nacionalista Party
5	Ric Yabut	Independent

==== Results ====
Candidate	Party	Votes	%
Kaye Naguit	Kambilan	163,645	33.56
Vince Calara (incumbent)	Lakas–CMD	121,624	24.94
Nestor Tolentino	Nacionalista Party	104,887	21.51
Ric Yabut	Independent	55,959	11.48
Sky Maglanque	Lakas–CMD	41,537	8.52
Total		487,652	100.00

== Congressional Elections ==
=== First District ===
Localities: City of Angeles, City of Mabalacat and Magalang

Incumbent Carmelo "Jon" Lazatin II is running for re-election unopposed. He ran under the PFP for this election.

Candidate	Party	Votes	%
Carmelo "Pogi" Lazatin Jr.	Partido Federal ng Pilipinas	261,971	100.00%
Total Valid Votes		261,971	100.00%

=== Second District ===
Localities: Floridablanca, Guagua, Lubao, Porac, Santa Rita, and Sasmuan

Former second female Philippine president Gloria Macapagal-Arroyo is running for re-election unopposed under the Lakas-CMD.

Candidate	Party	Votes	%
Gloria Macapagal Arroyo	Lakas–CMD	227,254	100.00%
Total Valid Votes		227,254	100.00%

=== Third District ===
Localities: City of San Fernando, Arayat, Bacolor, Mexico, and Santa Ana

Incumbent Aurelo Gonzales Jr of Lakas-CMD, who was elected in 2016, is term-limited and Alyssa Michaela Gonzales is her party's nominee. Challenging her is Dra Hazel Tumang of the Nacionalista party and Paul Quiwa of Aksyon Demokratiko party.

Candidate	Party	Votes	%
Mica Gonzales	Lakas–CMD	213,914	55.07%
Dra. Hazel Tumang	Nacionalista	165,155	42.52%
Paul Quiwa	Aksyon Demokratiko	9,346	2.41%
Total Valid Votes		388,415	100.00%

=== Fourth District ===
Localities: Apalit, Candaba, Macabebe, Masantol, Minalin, San Luis, San Simon, Santo Tomas

Incumbent Anna York Bondoc is running for her second consecutive term (or fifth overall term) representing Pampanga's 4th congressional district. She switched from Nacionalista to NUP for this election. She will be challenged by two independent candidates, Jorge Antonio Bustos and Edgar Puno

Candidate	Party	Votes	%
Dra. Anna Bondoc	Nacionalista	203,602	52.42%
Jorge Antonio Bustos	Independent	105,944	27.28%
Edgar Puno	Independent	2,156	0.56%
Total Valid Votes		311,702	100.00%

== Municipal and City Elections ==
=== 1st District ===
==== Angeles City ====
Incumbent Carmelo Lazatin Jr. of KMBLN is running for re-election. He will be running under Lakas-CMD for this election.

Angeles City mayoral election
Party	Candidate	Votes	%
Lakas	Carmelo "Jon" Lazatin II	97,730	62.47
PRP	Gen Oca Albayalde	58,727	37.53
Total votes		156,457	100.00
Lakas gain from PRP			

Incumbent Vicky Vega of KMBLN is running for re-election. Both Lazatin and Vega switched to Lakas-CMD.

Angeles City vice mayoral election
Party	Candidate	Votes	%
PRP	Amos Rivera	79,481	52.45
Lakas	Vicky Vega	72,042	47.55
Total votes		151,523	100.00
PRP gain from Lakas			

Ten members of Sangguniang Panlungsod shall be elected through plurality-at-large voting.

Angeles City Council election
Party	Candidate	Votes	%
Lakas	Atty Arvin "Pogs" Suller	91,419	8.08
Lakas	JC Parker Aguas	79,368	7.02
Lakas	Kap Niknok Bañola	70,699	6.25
Independent	Maricel "Marang" Morales	69,556	6.15
Lakas	Edu Pamintuan	68,661	6.07
Lakas	Ron Pineda	67,356	5.95
Lakas	Alex Mr In Indiongco	64,913	5.74
Lakas	Doc Mich Bonifacio	57,915	5.12
Independent	Atty. Jeselle Dayrit	54,889	4.85
Lakas	Raco Del Rosario	52,288	4.62
Independent	Jan Sangil	51,525	4.55
Lakas	Alfred Sangil	51,394	4.54
Lakas	Kap Chris Cortez	45,354	4.01
PRP	Aljur Abrenica	41,839	3.70
Independent	Philip Samson Pangilinan	37,338	3.30
NPC	Tony Mamac	35,019	3.10
PRP	Doc Pie Juan	34,612	3.06
PRP	Patrick Propesor Cura	30,196	2.67
PRP	Lab Nacu	26,246	2.32
PRP	Don Quito	22,509	1.99
PRP	Amung Cris Cadiang	20,292	1.79
PRP	Rhoda Timaio	18,695	1.65
PRP	Kabayan Nong Tamayo	13,988	1.24
Independent	Doc Madlangbayan	6,440	0.57
Independent	Marvin Tropa	6,015	0.53
Independent	Angel Munar	4,809	0.42
Independent	Cheng Bangayan	4,594	0.41
Total votes		1,131,532	100.00
Lakas gain from PRP			

==== Mabalacat City ====
Incumbent Crisostomo Garbo is running for re-election. Challenging him is incumbent vice mayor Atty. Geld Aquino.

Mabalacat City mayoral election
Party	Candidate	Votes	%
Kapanalig at Kambilan ning Memalen Pampanga	Atty. Geld Aquino	69,625	57.64
NPC	Crisostomo Garbo	51,166	42.36
Total votes		120,791	100.00
Kapanalig at Kambilan ning Memalen Pampanga gain from NPC			

Incumbent Atty. Geld Aquino is running for mayor, Jun Castro is their party's nominee.

Mabalacat City vice mayoral election
Party	Candidate	Votes	%
Kapanalig at Kambilan ning Memalen Pampanga	Jun Castro	73,477	61.80
NPC	Win-Win Garbo	45,428	38.20
Total votes		118,905	100.00
Kapanalig at Kambilan ning Memalen Pampanga gain from NPC			

Ten members of Sangguniang Panlungsod shall be elected through plurality-at-large voting.

Mabalacat City Council election
Party	Candidate	Votes	%
Kapanalig at Kambilan ning Memalen Pampanga	Ike Morales	62,209	6.94
NPC	Timothy Paul Llanos Dee	55,108	6.15
Kapanalig at Kambilan ning Memalen Pampanga	Vicoy Ong	53,991	6.03
Kapanalig at Kambilan ning Memalen Pampanga	Eroll Pogi Soliven	51,245	5.72
Kapanalig at Kambilan ning Memalen Pampanga	Benny Jocson	48,982	5.47
Independent	Marjorie Grace Sambo	48,746	5.44
NPC	Noel Castro	48,045	5.36
Kapanalig at Kambilan ning Memalen Pampanga	Doc Stephen Aurelio	47,792	5.34
Kapanalig at Kambilan ning Memalen Pampanga	Patricia Anne Acorda	47,712	5.33
Kapanalig at Kambilan ning Memalen Pampanga	Liza Pineda	45,854	5.12
NPC	Doc Cocoy Tiglao	42,507	4.75
Independent	Rafael Liwanag	42,064	4.70
Kapanalig at Kambilan ning Memalen Pampanga	Engr Graham Tapion	41,706	4.66
NPC	Jerry Alang Ali Magsino	36,925	4.12
Kapanalig at Kambilan ning Memalen Pampanga	Marvin Tolentino	35,912	4.01
NPC	Rox Peña	34,160	3.81
NPC	Basti David	29,423	3.29
NPC	Carlo Francis Dizon	29,203	3.26
NPC	Kap Elmer Calaguas	28,041	3.13
NPC	Totong Mendiola	21,590	2.41
Independent	Benjie Bukol Pangan	18,410	2.06
Independent	Weng Malagu Dela Cruz	10,355	1.16
Independent	Mel Yutuc	6,341	0.71
Independent	Maricel Rodriguez	5,452	0.61
Total votes		895,969	100.00
Kapanalig at Kambilan ning Memalen Pampanga gain from NPC			

==== Magalang ====
Incumbent Malu Paras Lacson is eligible for re-election. Challenging her is incumbent vice mayor Joseph Guzman and Former Mayor Romulo Pecson.

Magalang mayoral election
Party	Candidate	Votes	%
NPC	Malu Paras-Lacson	37,760	54.33
Independent	Romulo Pecson	28,874	41.55
PDP	Joseph Duterte Guzman	2,864	4.12
Total votes		69,498	100.00
NPC hold			

Incumbent Councilor Eller Pecson is running for vice mayor.

Magalang vice mayoral election
Party	Candidate	Votes	%
Independent	Eller Pecson	33,675	50.32
Kapanalig at Kambilan ning Memalen Pampanga	Norman Lacson	33,240	49.68
Total votes		66,915	100.00
Independent gain from Kapanalig at Kambilan ning Memalen Pampanga			

=== 2nd District ===
==== Floridablanca ====
Incumbent Darren Manalansan is running for re-election. He will be challenged by incumbent vice mayor Michael Galang.

Floridablanca mayoral election
Party	Candidate	Votes	%
Kapanalig at Kambilan ning Memalen Pampanga	Michael Galang	26,713	41.40
Lakas	Darren Manalansan	24,937	38.64
NPC	Raul Capulong	11,756	18.22
Independent	Jonnas Paulo Razon	125	0.19
Total votes		63,531	100.00
Kapanalig at Kambilan ning Memalen Pampanga gain from Lakas			

Incumbent Michael Galang is running for mayor and his party nominated 2022 mayoral candidate Dok Poli Policarpio.

Floridablanca vice mayoral election
Party	Candidate	Votes	%
Kapanalig at Kambilan ning Memalen Pampanga	Dok Poli Policarpio	24,655	39.85
Independent	Sato Carlos	15,960	25.79
Lakas	Joerey Montemayor	9,251	14.95
Independent	Kambal Tolentino	6,078	9.82
NPC	Ed Guerrero	5,988	9.68
Total votes		61,872	100.00
Kapanalig at Kambilan ning Memalen Pampanga gain from Lakas			

==== Guagua ====
Incumbent Anthony Torres is eligible for re-election.

Guagua mayoral election
Party	Candidate	Votes	%
Kapanalig at Kambilan ning Memalen Pampanga	Anthony Ton Torres	38,819	73.94
Akbayan	Dante Torres	13,681	26.06
Total votes		52,500	100.00
Kapanalig at Kambilan ning Memalen Pampanga hold			

Incumbent Jun Lim is running unopposed.

Guagua vice mayoral election
Party	Candidate	Votes	%
Kapanalig at Kambilan ning Memalen Pampanga	Vice Jun Lim	41,655	100.00
Total votes		41,655	100.00
Kapanalig at Kambilan ning Memalen Pampanga hold			

==== Lubao ====
Incumbent Esmie Pineda is eligible for re-election.

Lubao mayoral election
Party	Candidate	Votes	%
Kapanalig at Kambilan ning Memalen Pampanga	Esmie Pineda	58,657	79.41
Independent	Salvador Dimson Jr.	15,208	20.59
Total votes		73,865	100.00
Kapanalig at Kambilan ning Memalen Pampanga hold			

Incumbent Jay Montemayor is running unopposed

Lubao vice mayoral election
Party	Candidate	Votes	%
Kapanalig at Kambilan ning Memalen Pampanga	Jay Montemayor	54,694	100.00
Total votes		54,694	100.00
Kapanalig at Kambilan ning Memalen Pampanga hold			

==== Porac ====
Incumbent Jing Capil is eligible for re-election and be running Independent.

Porac mayoral election
Party	Candidate	Votes	%
Independent	Jing Capil	39,939	59.84
Kapanalig at Kambilan ning Memalen Pampanga	Michael Tapang	23,063	34.55
Independent	Atty. Charlie Santos	3,744	5.61
Total votes		66,746	100.00
Independent gain from Kapanalig at Kambilan ning Memalen Pampanga			

Incumbent Budoy Tamayo will not seek for re-election. Jen Capil, the daughter of incumbent mayor Jing is her nominee for vice mayor.

Porac vice mayoral election
Party	Candidate	Votes	%
Independent	Jen Capil	39,342	60.28
Kapanalig at Kambilan ning Memalen Pampanga	Vincent Lusung	25,926	39.72
Total votes		65,268	100.00
Independent gain from Kapanalig at Kambilan ning Memalen Pampanga			

==== Santa Rita ====
Incumbent Art Salalila is eligible for re-election and will run under KMBLN. Challenging for the position is incumbent and senior councilor Reynan Calo.

Santa Rita mayoral election
Party	Candidate	Votes	%
Independent	Reynan Calo	14,256	57.48
Kapanalig at Kambilan ning Memalen Pampanga	Art Salalila	10,543	42.52
Total votes		24,799	100.00
Independent gain from Kapanalig at Kambilan ning Memalen Pampanga			

Incumbent Mery Carreon is running independent and eligible for re-election.

Santa Rita vice mayoral election
Party	Candidate	Votes	%
Kapanalig at Kambilan ning Memalen Pampanga	Dagi Salalila	13,330	54.82
Independent	Alvin Martin	6,494	26.71
Independent	Mercy Carreon	4,493	18.48
Total votes		24,317	100.00
Kapanalig at Kambilan ning Memalen Pampanga gain from Independent			

==== Sasmuan ====
Incumbent Lina Cabrera is running for re-election.

Sasmuan mayoral election
Party	Candidate	Votes	%
Lakas	Lina Bagasina Cabrera	12,677	61.97
Independent	Charito Montemayor	7,781	38.03
Total votes		20,458	100.00
Lakas hold			

Incumbent Nardo Velasco died in office on July 31, 2022. Senior councilor Pastor Jhun Tamayo assumed the role and is running for a full three-year term.

Sasmuan vice mayoral election
Party	Candidate	Votes	%
Lakas	Pastor Jhun Tamayo	7,234	36.58
Akbayan	Fernando Baltazar Jr.	6,475	32.74
Independent	Victor NMV Velasco	6,067	30.68
Total votes		19,776	100.00
Lakas gain from PDSP			

=== 3rd District ===
==== City of San Fernando ====
Incumbent Vilma Caluag is running Independent for this election. She will be challenged by Mylyn Pineda, the daughter of incumbent governor Lilia Pineda.

San Fernando mayoral election
Party	Candidate	Votes	%
Independent	Vilma Caluag	127,124	72.15
Kapanalig at Kambilan ning Memalen Pampanga	Mylyn Pineda-Cayabyab	49,061	27.85
Total votes		176,185	100.00
Independent gain from PDP–Laban			

Incumbent Tiger Lagman is running for re-election. Challenging him is incumbent senior Councilor Aurelio Brenz Gonzales.

San Fernando vice mayoral election
Party	Candidate	Votes	%
PFP	Aurelio Brenz Gonzales	128,191	74.78
Kapanalig at Kambilan ning Memalen Pampanga	BJ Tiger Lagman	43,230	25.22
Total votes		171,421	100.00
PFP gain from Kapanalig at Kambilan ning Memalen Pampanga			

Ten members of Sangguniang Panlungsod shall be elected through plurality-at-large voting.

San Fernando City Council election
Party	Candidate	Votes	%
Independent	Noel Tulabut	104,736	8.96
Independent	Reggie G4 David	100,040	8.56
Independent	Harvey Quiwa	95,841	8.20
Independent	Tino Dizon	92,987	7.96
Independent	Ate Kay Pineda	92,002	7.87
Independent	Angelo Hizon Jr.	90,559	7.75
Independent	Jay Cuyugan	86,840	7.43
Independent	Mark Joseph Carreon	83,941	7.18
Independent	Jayson Sicat	60,618	5.19
Independent	Elmer Bengco	59,106	5.06
Kapanalig at Kambilan ning Memalen Pampanga	Kristel Ato Agustin	54,625	4.67
Kapanalig at Kambilan ning Memalen Pampanga	Tin Kings Chua	51,921	4.44
Kapanalig at Kambilan ning Memalen Pampanga	Doc Ayzel Macalino	46,194	3.95
Kapanalig at Kambilan ning Memalen Pampanga	Perico Quiwa	46,108	3.94
Kapanalig at Kambilan ning Memalen Pampanga	Angel Puti Wijangco	42,992	3.68
Kapanalig at Kambilan ning Memalen Pampanga	Tina David Lagman	37,696	3.22
Kapanalig at Kambilan ning Memalen Pampanga	Doc Benjie Angeles	29,843	2.55
Kapanalig at Kambilan ning Memalen Pampanga	Ricky Hizon	28,617	2.45
Kapanalig at Kambilan ning Memalen Pampanga	NanayKap Rose Calimlim	28,378	2.43
Kapanalig at Kambilan ning Memalen Pampanga	Rosalie Alvin Mendoza	21,010	1.80
Independent	Edsel Miranda	16,449	1.41
Total votes		1,168,463	100.00
Independent gain from Kapanalig at Kambilan ning Memalen Pampanga			

==== Arayat ====
Incumbent Madir Alejandrino is running for re-election.

Arayat mayoral election
Party	Candidate	Votes	%
NPC	Jeffrey Luriz	38,765	57.13
Independent	RV Venasquez	21,990	32.41
Kapanalig at Kambilan ning Memalen Pampanga	Madir Alejandrino	7,098	10.46
Total votes		67,853	100.00
NPC gain from Kapanalig at Kambilan ning Memalen Pampanga			

Incumbent Bon Alejandrino died in office in June of 2024. Senior municipal councilor Ramon "Monching" Chancoco assumed in office on June 29, 2024. He previously served as vice mayor of Arayat from 2013-2022 and will run for his fourth term as vice mayor.

Arayat vice mayoral election
Party	Candidate	Votes	%
Lakas	Monching Changcoco	26,589	42.88
NPC	Froilan Soriano	14,235	22.96
Independent	Che Lumbang	12,308	19.85
Independent	Marlon Balagtas	8,869	14.30
Total votes		62,001	100.00
Lakas gain from Kapanalig at Kambilan ning Memalen Pampanga			

==== Bacolor ====
Incumbent Eduardo "Diman" Datu is running for re-election unopposed.

Bacolor mayoral election
Party	Candidate	Votes	%
Kapanalig at Kambilan ning Memalen Pampanga	Eduardo "Diman" Datu	34,372	100.00
Total votes		34,372	100.00
Kapanalig at Kambilan ning Memalen Pampanga hold			

Incumbent Ron Earvin Dungca is running for re-election unopposed.

Bacolor vice mayoral election
Party	Candidate	Votes	%
Kapanalig at Kambilan ning Memalen Pampanga	Ron Earvin Dungca	32,785	100.00
Total votes		32,785	100.00
Kapanalig at Kambilan ning Memalen Pampanga hold			

==== Mexico ====
Incumbent Ruding Gonzales is running for mayor.

Mexico mayoral election
Party	Candidate	Votes	%
Lakas	Ruding Gonzales	46,841	54.00
Nacionalista	Arkitek Alex Tumang	37,529	43.27
Independent	Lenin Salas	2,058	2.37
Independent	Edwin Pangilinan	398	0.46
Total votes		86,826	100.00
Lakas gain from Nacionalista			

Incumbent Site Siron is running for vice mayor.

Mexico vice mayoral election
Party	Candidate	Votes	%
Lakas	Doc Jonathan Pangan	44,223	53.41
Nacionalista	Site Siron	38,579	46.59
Total votes		82,802	100.00
Lakas gain from Aksyon			

==== Santa Ana ====
Incumbent Ross Gamboa is running for vice mayor and will switch positions with incumbent vice mayor Banung Barro. Both will run under Lakas-CMD for this election.

Santa Ana mayoral election
Party	Candidate	Votes	%
Kapanalig at Kambilan ning Memalen Pampanga	Ferdinand "Dinan" Labung	17,314	55.53
Lakas	Banung Barro	11,757	37.71
Independent	Rolando Maglanque	2,107	6.76
Total votes		31,178	100.00
Kapanalig at Kambilan ning Memalen Pampanga gain from Lakas			

Incumbent Banung Barro is running for mayor and will switch positions with incumbent mayor Ross Gamboa. Both will run under Lakas-CMD for this election. Gamboa will be challenged by senior municipal councilor Oday Nacpil.

Santa Ana vice mayoral election
Party	Candidate	Votes	%
Kapanalig at Kambilan ning Memalen Pampanga	Oday Nacpil	20,092	65.77
Lakas	Ross Gamboa	10,456	34.23
Total votes		30,548	100.00
Kapanalig at Kambilan ning Memalen Pampanga gain from Lakas			

=== 4th District ===
==== Apalit ====
Incumbent Jun Tetangco is running unopposed.

Apalit mayoral election
Party	Candidate	Votes	%
NPC	Jun Tetangco	42,814	100.00
Total votes		42,814	100.00
NPC hold			

Incumbent Peter Nucom is running for re-election from KMBLN to NPC.

Apalit vice mayoral election
Party	Candidate	Votes	%
NPC	Peter Nucom	42,275	82.52
Independent	Eliasdoc Mendoza	8,953	17.48
Total votes		51,228	100.00
NPC gain from Kapanalig at Kambilan ning Memalen Pampanga			

==== Candaba ====
Incumbent Rene Maglanque is running for re-election from KMBLN to NPC.

Candaba mayoral election
Party	Candidate	Votes	%
NPC	Rene Maglanque	40,267	56.19
Independent	Aniway Baylon	26,438	36.89
Aksyon	Resty Tiko Sibug	4,960	6.92
Total votes		71,665	100.00
NPC gain from Kapanalig at Kambilan ning Memalen Pampanga			

Incumbent Resty Sibug will run for mayor under Aksyon Demokratiko.

Candaba vice mayoral election
Party	Candidate	Votes	%
NPC	Ate Thelma Macapagal	45,878	67.40
Independent	Andy Gulapa	17,836	26.20
Aksyon	Dollie Doll Santiago	4,350	6.40
Total votes		68,064	100.00
NPC gain from Kapanalig at Kambilan ning Memalen Pampanga			

==== Macabebe ====
Incumbent Bobong Flores is running unopposed.

Macabebe mayoral election
Party	Candidate	Votes	%
Nacionalista	Bobong Flores	27,733	100.00
Total votes		27,733	100.00
Nacionalista hold			

Incumbent Vince Flores will is running unopposed.

Macabebe vice mayoral election
Party	Candidate	Votes	%
Nacionalista	Vince Flores	27,365	100.00
Total votes		27,365	100.00
Nacionalista hold			

==== Masantol ====
Incumbent Tonton Bustos is eligible for re-election. He will be running under Lakas-CMD.

Masantol mayoral election
Party	Candidate	Votes	%
NPC	Dan Guintu	19,673	54.85
Lakas	Ton Ton Bustos	16,193	45.15
Total votes		35,866	100.00
NPC gain from PDP–Laban			

Incumbent Dan Guintu is running for mayor. His niece, Buday Guintu is the party's nominee.

Masantol vice mayoral election
Party	Candidate	Votes	%
NPC	Buday Guintu	19,108	55.61
Lakas	Joshua Bustos	13,732	39.96
Independent	Abelardo Algarne	1,522	4.43
Total votes		34,362	100.00
NPC hold			

==== Minalin ====
Incumbent Philip Naguit is running for re-election under KMBLN and unopposed.

Minalin mayoral election
Party	Candidate	Votes	%
Kapanalig at Kambilan ning Memalen Pampanga	Philip Naguit	21,191	100.00
Total votes		21,191	100.00
Kapanalig at Kambilan ning Memalen Pampanga gain from Aksyon			

Incumbent Rondon Mercado is eligible for re-election under UNA.

Minalin vice mayoral election
Party	Candidate	Votes	%
UNA	Rondon Mercado	13,428	52.86
Kapanalig at Kambilan ning Memalen Pampanga	Edgar Tizon	11,973	47.14
Total votes		25,401	100.00
UNA gain from PFP			

==== San Luis ====
Incumbent J Sagum is running for re-election and unopposed

San Luis mayoral election
Party	Candidate	Votes	%
Nacionalista	J. Sagum	26,459	100.00
Total votes		26,459	100.00
Nacionalista hold			

Incumbent Mon Sagum is eligible for re-election and will run under NPC.

San Luis vice mayoral election
Party	Candidate	Votes	%
NPC	Mon Sagum	23,513	100.00
Total votes		23,513	100.00
NPC gain from Kapanalig at Kambilan ning Memalen Pampanga			

==== San Simon ====
Incumbent JP Punsalan is running for re-election.

San Simon mayoral election
Party	Candidate	Votes	%
Nacionalista	JP Punsalan	18,114	47.78
Lakas	Dading Santos	17,581	46.37
PFP	Rommel Bondoc	2,218	5.85
Total votes		37,913	100.00
Nacionalista hold			

Incumbent Dading Santos is running for mayor under Lakas

San Simon vice mayoral election
Party	Candidate	Votes	%
Lakas	Anne Canlas	18,726	50.29
Nacionalista	Janice “JP” Punsalan-Reyes	14,644	39.33
PFP	Jojo Gutierrez	3,867	10.38
Total votes		37,237	100.00
Lakas gain from Nacionalista			

==== Santo Tomas ====
Incumbent John Sambo is running for re-election under NPC.

Santo Tomas mayoral election
Party	Candidate	Votes	%
NPC	John Sambo	11,892	40.51
Lakas	Raymond Ronquillo	9,593	32.68
Nacionalista	Bong Pineda	7,869	26.81
Total votes		29,354	100.00
NPC gain from Kapanalig at Kambilan ning Memalen Pampanga			

Incumbent Bong Pineda is running for mayor.

Santo Tomas vice mayoral election
Party	Candidate	Votes	%
Lakas	Ninang Ronquillo	16,021	58.96
Nacionalista	Gel Euperio	10,433	38.39
Independent	Regie Mallari	720	2.65
Total votes		27,174	100.00
Lakas gain from Nacionalista			
