= Kambilan =

Political party based in Pampanga

KAMBILAN Kapanalig at Kambilan ning Memalen Pampanga Ally and Shield of the People of Pampanga
- President: Dennis Pineda
- Chairman: Lilia Pineda
- Founder: Lilia Pineda
- Founded: 2012
- Headquarters: Lubao, Pampanga
- Ideology: Populism; Grassroots democracy
- Political position: Center
- National affiliation: NPC (2012–present); NUP (2012–2024); HNP (2018–2019); Uniteam (2021–2022)
- Regional affiliation: Nanay Partylist
- International affiliation: None
- Colors: Green
- Slogan: Kapanalig at Kambilan ning Memalen Pampanga
- House of Representatives (Pampanga seats): 2 / 4
- Provincial Governor: 1 / 1
- Provincial Vice Governor: 1 / 1
- Board Members: 8 / 13

Kapanalig at Kambilan ning Memalen Pampanga (transl. Ally and Shield of the People of Pampanga), commonly known as KAMBILAN, is a local political party based in the province of Pampanga, Philippines. Founded in 2012 by Governor Lilia Pineda, it functions as a provincial political organization that consolidates local political alliances and supports candidates across Pampanga’s provincial and municipal governments.

As of the mid-2020s, the party remains one of the dominant political groups in Pampanga, closely associated with the Pineda political family.

== History ==
KAMBILAN was launched in September 24, 2012 in San Fernando, Pampanga, as a provincial political party organized by Governor Lilia Pineda. According to reporting by the Philippine Daily Inquirer, the party was formed to consolidate the governor’s political allies under a single local umbrella ahead of the 2013 elections, particularly as she sought re-election alongside her son, Dennis Pineda, who was preparing to run for vice governor.

KAMBILAN was previously involved in political efforts supporting Governor Pineda, including participation in a 2008 recall attempt against former Governor Eddie Panlilio, which ultimately did not succeed. Panlilio later lost his re-election bid to Pineda in 2010.

== Influence and alliance ==
Since its inception, KAMBILAN has played a significant role in Pampanga's political landscape. The party has successfully fielded candidates for various local positions, including governorships, vice-governorships, and municipal offices. In 2018, KAMBILAN formed an alliance with Hugpong ng Pagbabago, a regional party led by Sara Duterte, enhancing its political reach and influence in Pampanga.

In the 2022 elections, KAMBILAN endorsed several candidates, including the re-election of Angeles City mayor Carmelo Lazatin Jr., who secured 70.51% of the vote. The party's endorsement has been pivotal in the success of its candidates, demonstrating its substantial support base within the province.

== Electoral results ==
=== Gubernatorial elections ===
Year	Candidate	Votes	%	Result	Note
2013	Lilia Pineda	507,207	71.53	Won	Under National Unity Party
2016	Lilia Pineda	737,481	100.00	Unopposed	Under National Unity Party
2019	Dennis Pineda	657,606	73.25	Won	Under Nationalist People's Coalition
2022	Dennis Pineda	668,787	58.95	Won	Under Nationalist People's Coalition
2025	Lilia Pineda	709,694	59.48	Won	Under Nationalist People's Coalition

=== House of Representatives elections ===
Election	Seats allocated for Pampanga	Outcome of election
2013	1 / 4	Joined the majority
2016	0 / 4	Lost
2019	2 / 4	Joined the majority
2022	3 / 4	Joined the majority
2025	2 / 4	Joined the majority
