= Governor of Pampanga =

Local chief executive

- Gobernador ng Lalawigan ng Pampanga
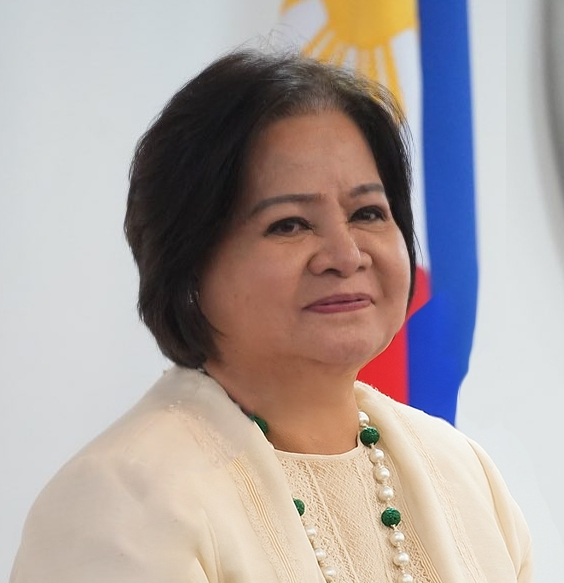
- Incumbent; Lilia Pineda (Kambilan) since June 30, 2025
- Style: The Honourable
- Seat: Pampanga Provincial Capitol
- Appointer: Direct popular vote
- Term length: 3 years
- Constituting instrument: Philippine Commission Act No. 83; Republic Act No. 7160
- Inaugural holder: José Avilés (Spanish administration); Tiburcio Hilario (Revolutionary Government); Ceferino Joven (Civil Government)
- Formation: 1812 (start of the Spanish administration); 1901 (start of the Civil Government by virtue of Philippine Commission Provincial Government Act)
- Deputy: Vice Governor of Pampanga
- Salary: ₱185,695.00 - ₱207,978.00 (monthly; Salary Grade 30 as of January 1, 2022)

The governor of Pampanga (Filipino: Punong Panlalawigan ng Pampanga) is the local chief executive of the Philippine province of Pampanga.

== List of governors of Pampanga ==
=== Spanish era ===
==== Alcaldes Mayores (1812-1886) ====
- José Avilés (1812-1820)
- Francisco Paula de los Santos (1821-1824)
- Fulgencio Núñez (1821-1824)
- Manuel de Olea (1824-1827)
- Antonio Chacón y Conde (1827-1831)
- Juan Garrido (1831-1836)
- Mariano Valero y Soto (1836-1839)
- Ángel Viniegra (1839-1840)
- Mariano Valero y Soto (1846-1847)
- Juan López Cordón (1848-1849)
- Manuel Gastero Serrano (1849-1850)
- Fernando Cajigas (1850-1852)
- José Paez y López (1852-1854)
- José Sánchez Guerrero (1854-1855)
- Francisco Paula de Rodríguez (1855-1856)
- Francisco Hidalgo y Caballero (1856-1860)
- José María Barrasa (1860-1862)
- Ramón Barrueta (1862-1864)
- Mariano de la Cortina y Oñate (1864)
- Toribio de Vega (1864-1865)
- Juan Muñoz y Álvarez (1865-1866)
- José Bolaños (1867)
- Francisco Godínez y Esteban (1869-1870)
- Francisco Pérez Romero (1870-1871)
- Atilano Romay (1871-1872)
- José Dias y Oliver (1873)
- José Feced y Temprado (1873-1874)
- Emilio Martín Bolaños (1875)
- Miguel Sanz y Urtasun (1875-1877)
- José Feced y Temprado (1877-1879)
- Antonio Graciano de Oro (1879)
- Genaro Carrera y Carmona (1880)
- Rafael Manzanares (1880-1881)
- Antonio Graciano de Oro (1881-1883)
- Francisco Pampillón y Urbina (1883-1884)
- Gaspar Castaño y González Alberú (1884)
- Emilio Martín Bolaños (1885-1886)

==== Gobernadores Civiles (1886-1898) ====
- Estanislao de Antonio y Garanto (1886)
- Walfrido Regüeiferos y González (1886-1887)
- Antonio del Águila y Mendoza (1887-1888)
- Luis de la Torre Villanueva (1888-1891)
- José Ignacio Chacón (1891-1892)
- Joaquín Oliver (1892-1893)
- Ángel Bascarán y Federic (1893)
- Tomás Pérez del Pulgar y O'Lawlor (1893-1895)
- José Cánovas y Vallejo (1895-1898)
- Marcelino de la Mota Velarde (1898)

=== Governors of Pampanga (1896–present) ===
Governor	Term in office	Party	Vice Governor	Era
Tiburcio Hilario	1896 – June 26, 1898	Nonpartisan	None	Revolutionary Government
Mariano Alimurung (Note: Acting governor)	1898	Nonpartisan	None	Revolutionary Government
Tomás Mascardo	1899	Nonpartisan	None	Revolutionary Government
Francisco Dizon	1900	Nonpartisan	None	Revolutionary Government
José Alejandrino	1900–1901	Nonpartisan	None	Revolutionary Government
Frederick Dent Grant	August 1899 – May 4, 1900	Republican	None	U.S. Insular Government
Arthur MacArthur Jr.	May 4, 1900 – July 3, 1901	Republican	None	U.S. Insular Government
Ceferino Joven	February 27, 1902 – 1903	Independent	None	U.S. Insular Government
Macario Arnedo	March 7, 1904 – 1911	Progresista	None	U.S. Insular Government
Mariano Lim	1911	Independent	None	U.S. Insular Government
Francisco Tongio Liongson	1912–1916	Nacionalista	None	U.S. Insular Government
Honorio Ventura	1916–1917	Nacionalista	None	U.S. Insular Government
Pablo Ángeles David	1917	Nacionalista	None	U.S. Insular Government
Honorio Ventura	1918–1922	Nacionalista	None	U.S. Insular Government
Olimpio Guanzon	1922–1925	Democrata	None	U.S. Insular Government
Sotero Baluyut	1925–1931	Nacionalista	None	U.S. Insular Government
Eligio Lagman	June 15, 1931 – October 15, 1931	Nacionalista	None	U.S. Insular Government
Pablo Ángeles David	1931–1937	Nacionalista	None	Commonwealth
Sotero Baluyut	1938–1941	Nacionalista	None	Commonwealth
Fausto González Sioco	1941	Nacionalista	None	Commonwealth
José P. Fausto	1941	Nacionalista	None	Commonwealth
Lazaro Alfonso Yambao	1942	Nacionalista	None	Commonwealth
Eligio Lagman	1942–1944	KALIBAPI	None	Second Republic
Urbano Dizon	1944	KALIBAPI	None	Second Republic
José G. David	1944	KALIBAPI	None	Second Republic
Gerardo Limlingan	1945	Nacionalista	None	Commonwealth
Pablo Ángeles David	1945 – December 30, 1947	Nacionalista	None	Third Republic
Pablo Ángeles David	1945 – December 30, 1947	Liberal	None	Third Republic
Jose B. Lingad	December 30, 1947 – December 30, 1951	Liberal	None	Third Republic
Rafael Lazatin	December 30, 1951 – December 30, 1959	Nacionalista	None	Third Republic
Francisco Nepomuceno	December 30, 1959 – September 3, 1962	Liberal	Rodolfo Hizon (1959–1962)	Third Republic
Dominador Danan	September 3, 1962 – September 1962	Liberal	Rodolfo Hizon	Third Republic
Francisco Nepomuceno	September 1962 – December 30, 1971	Liberal	Angel Macapagal (1963–1965)	Third Republic
Francisco Nepomuceno	September 1962 – December 30, 1971	Liberal	Amado Castillo (1965–1967)	Third Republic
Francisco Nepomuceno	September 1962 – December 30, 1971	Liberal	Rodolfo Hizon (1967–1971)	Third Republic
Brigido Valencia	December 30, 1971 – March 1976	Liberal	Cicero Punsalan	Martial law
Juanita Nepomuceno	April 11, 1976 – March 3, 1980	Liberal	Vacant	Martial law
Estelito Mendoza	March 3, 1980 – June 30, 1984	KBL	Cicero Punsalan	Fourth Republic
Cicero Punsalan	July 16, 1984 – November 19, 1985	KBL		Fourth Republic
Estelito Mendoza	November 19, 1985 – February 25, 1986	KBL		Fourth Republic
Bren Guiao (Note: Appointed Officer in charge)	February 25, 1986 – June 30, 1995	UNIDO	Robin Nepomuceno (1986–1987)	Provisional Government
Bren Guiao	February 25, 1986 – June 30, 1995	UNIDO	Cielo Macapagal-Salgado (1988–1992)	
Bren Guiao	February 25, 1986 – June 30, 1995	LDP	Cielo Macapagal-Salgado (1988–1992)	Fifth Republic
Bren Guiao	February 25, 1986 – June 30, 1995	Lakas	Lito Lapid (1992–1995)	Fifth Republic
Lito Lapid	June 30, 1995 – June 30, 2004	NPC	Cielo Macapagal-Salgado (1995–1998)	Fifth Republic
Lito Lapid	June 30, 1995 – June 30, 2004	Lakas		Fifth Republic
Lito Lapid	June 30, 1995 – June 30, 2004	Lakas	Clayton Olalia (1998–2001)	Fifth Republic
Lito Lapid	June 30, 1995 – June 30, 2004	Lakas	Mikey Arroyo (2001–2004)	Fifth Republic
Mark Lapid	June 30, 2004 – June 30, 2007	Lakas	Yeng Guiao	Fifth Republic
Eddie Panlilio	June 30, 2007 – June 30, 2010	Independent	Yeng Guiao	Fifth Republic
Eddie Panlilio	June 30, 2007 – June 30, 2010	Liberal	Yeng Guiao	Fifth Republic
Lilia Pineda	June 30, 2010 – June 30, 2019	Lakas–Kampi	Yeng Guiao (2010–2013)	Fifth Republic
Lilia Pineda	June 30, 2010 – June 30, 2019	NUP (Kambilan)	Dennis Pineda (2013–2019)	Fifth Republic
Dennis Pineda	June 30, 2019 – June 30, 2025	NPC (Kambilan)	Lilia Pineda	Fifth Republic
Lilia Pineda	June 30, 2025 – present	NPC (Kambilan)	Dennis Pineda	Fifth Republic

== Elections ==
- 2001 Pampanga local elections
- 2004 Pampanga local elections
- 2007 Pampanga local elections
- 2010 Pampanga local elections
- 2013 Pampanga local elections
- 2016 Pampanga local elections
- 2019 Pampanga local elections
- 2022 Pampanga local elections
- 2025 Pampanga local elections
