= Eddie Panlilio =

Filipino politician and priest

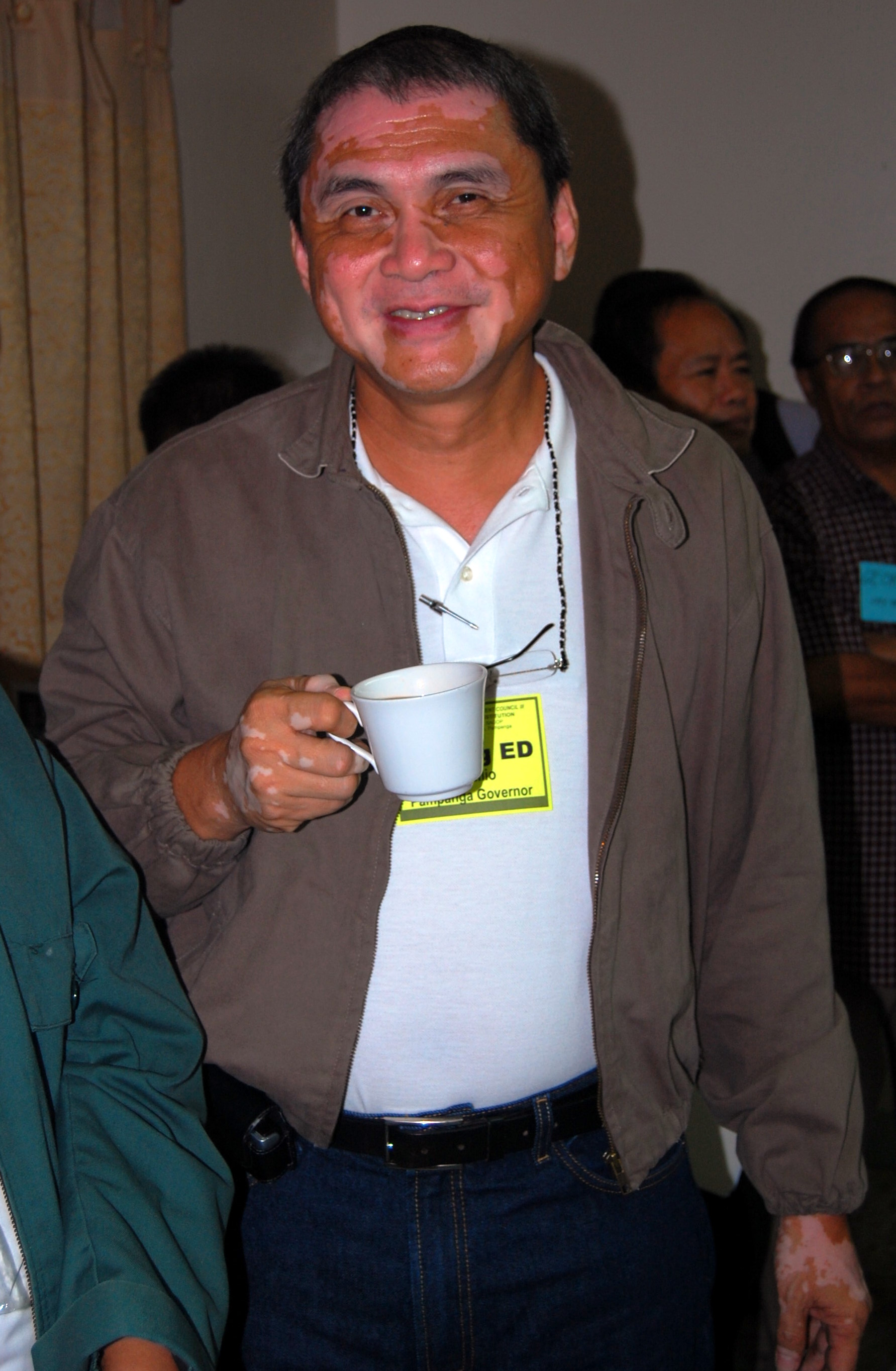
- Panlilio in 2007

32nd Governor of Pampanga
- In office June 30, 2007 – June 30, 2010
- Vice Governor: Yeng Guiao
- Preceded by: Mark Lapid
- Succeeded by: Lilia Pineda

Personal details
- Born: Eddie Tongol Panlilio; December 6, 1953 (age 72) Minalin, Pampanga, Philippines
- Party: Liberal (2009–2014; 2024–present)
- Other political affiliations: Independent (2007–2009; 2014–2024)
- Education: Don Bosco Academy, Pampanga (primary); Don Honorio Ventura College of Arts and Trades (secondary)
- Alma mater: Saint Augustine Major Seminary (AB)
- Occupation: Politician; priest
- Nickname(s): Among Ed, Eddie

Eddie "Among Ed" Tongol Panlilio (Tagalog: [pɐn̪ˈlil.jo]; born December 6, 1953) is a Filipino former Roman Catholic priest who served as the Governor of Pampanga from 2007 to 2010. He was suspended from his priestly duties upon announcing his intention to run as governor. He was elected governor in May 2007 in a three-way race against incumbent governor Mark Lapid and provincial board member Lilia Pineda. In February 2010, following a recount of votes due to an election protest, the Comelec ruled that Lilia Pineda had won the 2007 election over Panlilio.

Panlilio was named "Filipino of the Year" for 2007 by the Philippine Daily Inquirer.

== Early life and education ==
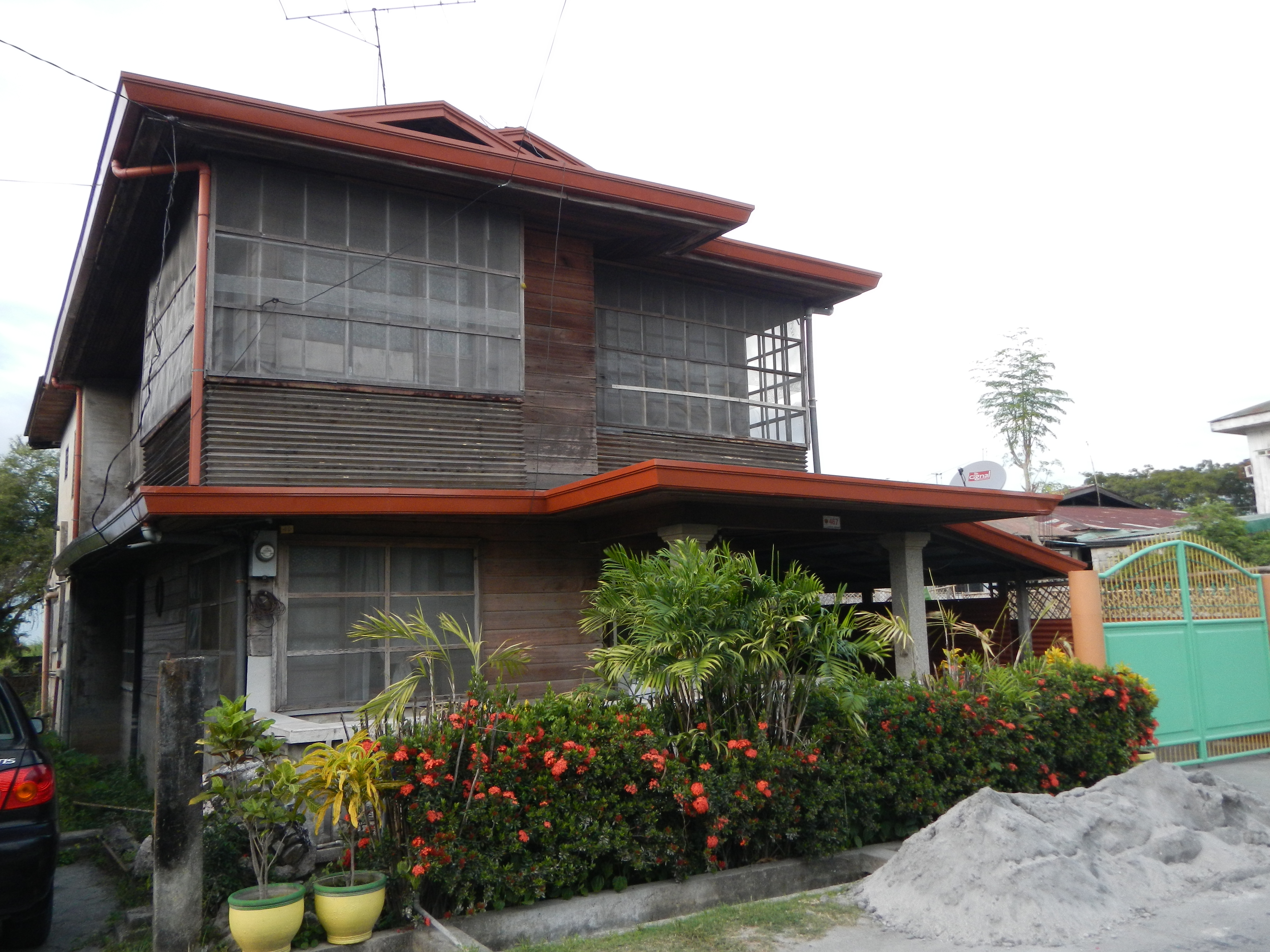
Minalin, Pampanga (Poblacion) ancestral house and lot, where Eddie Panlilio was born

Eddie Tongol Panlilio was born in Minalin, Pampanga on December 6, 1953. He is the sixth of seven children of Gervacio Cunanan Panlilio and Catalina Tongol. He is afflicted with vitiligo, a rare skin disease.

After finishing elementary school at the Minalin Central Elementary School, Panlilio enrolled the Don Bosco Academy, Pampanga his sophomore year after spending a year at the Don Honorio Ventura College of Arts and Trades (DHVCAT). Panlilio attended several seminaries, and after finishing his theology at the Saint Augustine Major Seminary was ordained priest on December 13, 1981.

== Priesthood ==
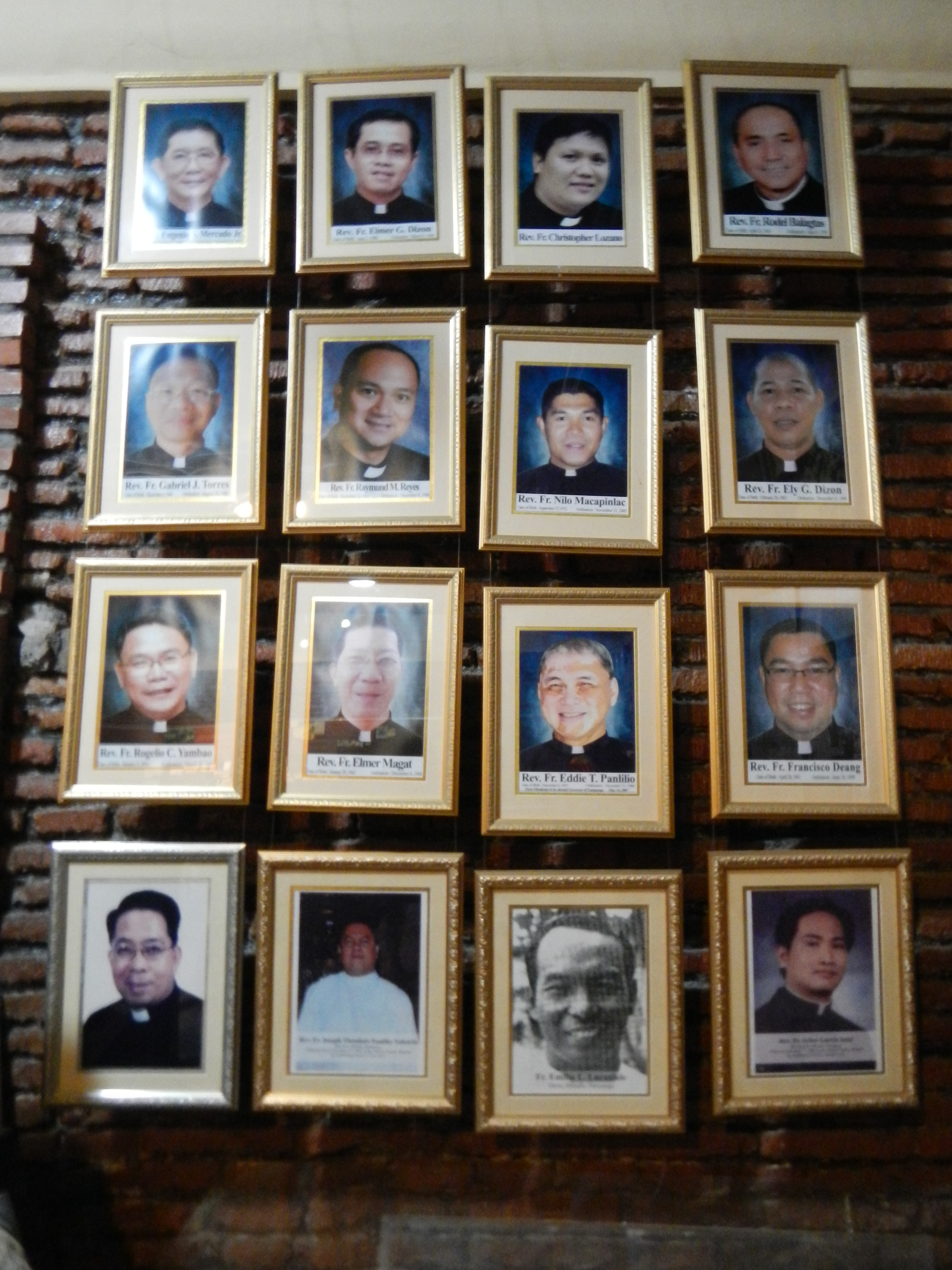
Eddie T. Panlilio and 15 other priests from Minalin, Pampanga (Santa Monica Parish Church museum)

For fifteen years, Panlilio was the director of the Social Action Center of Pampanga (SACOP), which worked with communities displaced by lahar following the 1991 eruption of Mount Pinatubo. He established the micro-lending program Talete king Panyulung ning Kapampangan Inc. (TPKI), based on the Grameen Bank-approach. TPKI released P2 billion in loans to small entrepreneurs in Central Luzon.

Panlilio was suspended from the priesthood by his superior, San Fernando archbishop Paciano Aniceto, for running for governor of Pampanga in 2007. This means that he is forbidden by the Catholic Church to practice priesthood or perform any of the sacraments reserved to priests. The 1983 Code of Canon Law, specifically Canon 285.3, forbids priests from occupying political posts. Bishop Leonardo Medroso, chairman of the Catholic Bishops Conference of the Philippines Episcopal Commission on Canon Law cited a conflict between a role in politics and in the church.

== Political career ==
Panlilio ran for governor of Pampanga in the 2007 Philippine general election. Panlilio defended his decision to enter politics as a logical continuation of his ministry for the poor, whom he saw as having been exploited and neglected for too long by successive administrations of corrupt and uncaring politicians.

Without any political party, he won over his two competitors, provincial board member Lilia Pineda and re-electionist governor Mark Lapid (both allies of President Gloria Macapagal Arroyo). He defeated Pineda by a narrow margin of 1,147 votes out of over 600,000 votes cast.

=== Governor of Pampanga (2007–2010) ===
Panlilio was inaugurated as the 31st governor of Pampanga on June 30, 2007. Supreme Court Associate Justice Consuelo Ynares-Santiago administered the oath of office. During the inauguration, Panlilio vowed to stop corruption and to make the province an example of a "new dawn in Philippine politics". Among his key policy issues was the fight against illegal gambling, with Pampanga having been viewed as the country's major center of "jueteng" or illegal gambling.

One of Panlilio's achievements in office was to increase the province's revenue from quarry taxes. It is suspected that under previous governors, notably Mark Lapid and Lito Lapid, the large quarry industry was riddled with corruption and graft. The increased tax base led to fighting among mayors over the new revenue.

On August 27, 2007, Panlilio campaigned to bring his government closer to the Kapampangans by leading the caravan "Pamisaupan (Helping One Another)". Panlilio and his team delivered aid to San Luis Hospital. Panlilio further vowed to improve the facilities and conditions in the province's nine district hospitals including the Diosdado Macapagal Provincial Hospital from funds (P143-million development fund) and private groups' contributions. The capitol's P37-million special education fund (SEF) would be utilized for the SEFs of towns.

Panlilio launched the White Ribbon campaign on October 1, 2007, to engage the people of Pampanga to get involved in the crusade for good governance and good citizenship.

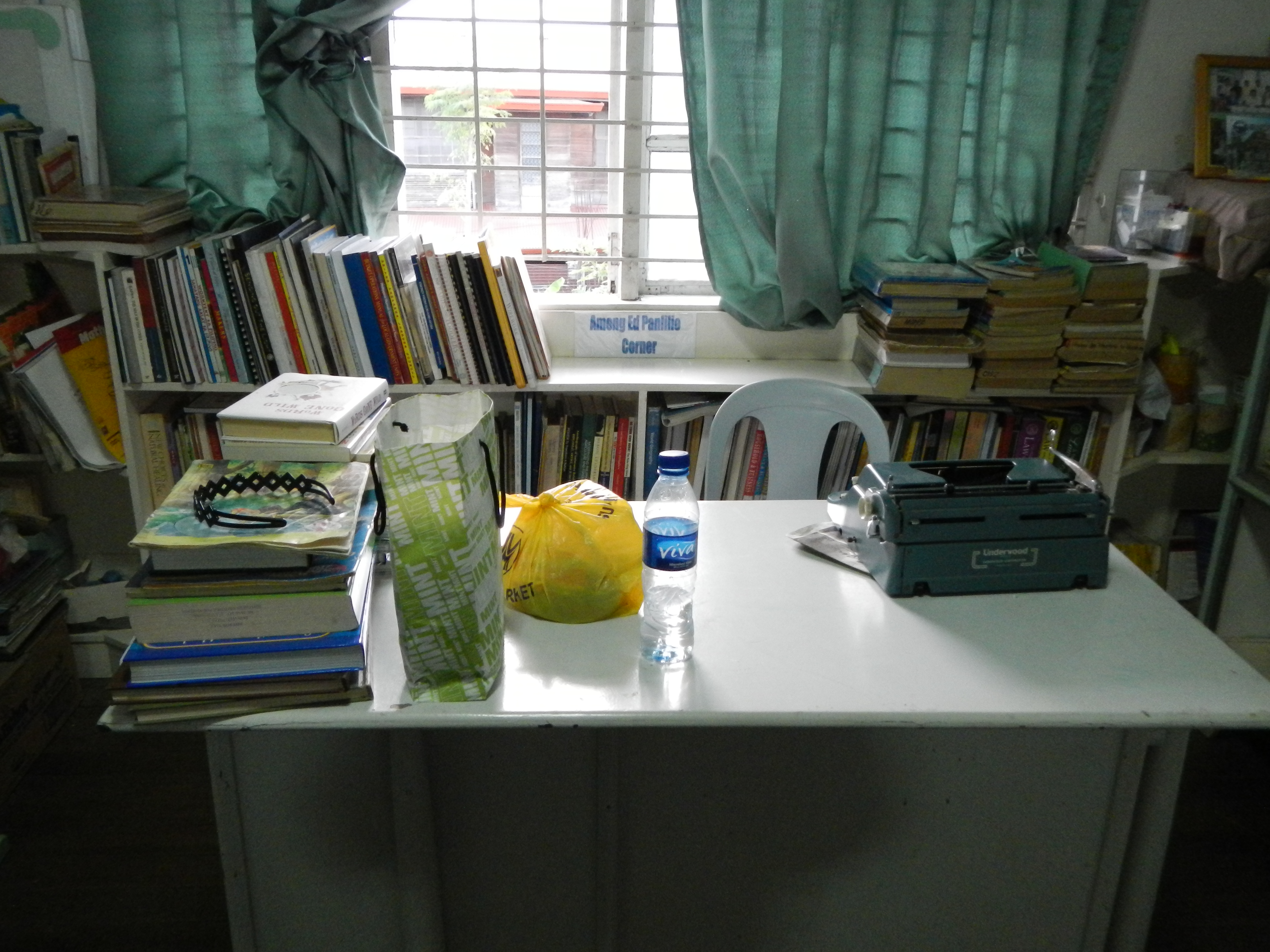
Minalin, Pampanga "Museo Ampon Simpanan Kabiasnan Ning Minalin" (Museum and Library of Minalin Among Ed Corner - books donated by Panlilio after his 2010 election defeat)

On October 13, 2007, Panlilio admitted that a staff of Malacañang personally gave him a brown paper gift bag with 500,000 Philippine pesos (P1,000 bills in 5 bundles, P100,000 each). Panlilio confessed that money changed hands after the meeting "because as a priest and a public officer, I should not lie. I believe that since the money came from Malacanang, I also believe it is public money. So I should be accountable for it and transparent about it." The incident was said to have occurred after President Arroyo called a meeting with 200 officials who were members of the Union of Local Authorities of the Philippines (Ulap), during which envelopes of P200,000 and P500,000 were allegedly distributed.

On June 23, 2008, Panlilio filed a complaint for plunder against Lubao businessman Rodolfo "Bong" Pineda before the Ombudsman in Quezon City. He accused Pineda of conspiracy with Joseph Estrada, based on the verdict rendered by the Sandiganbayan. The complain was supported by 60 Catholic bishops.

Panlilio was also the subject of a corruption complaint filed against him in April 2008 by Vice Governor Yeng Guiao over his failure to implement a 2007 financial ordinance. He was also the subject of a prayer rally in June 2009 led by 18 Pampanga mayors against him, during which he was accused of having an "autocratic style of governance" and poor performance in office.

On June 24, 2008, lawyer Elly Pamatong filed a perjury criminal case with the COMELEC Legal Department against Panlilio for under-declaration of expenditures and contribution receipts.

=== Recount petition and dismissal ===
On August 21, 2008, the non-profit organization Kapanalig at Kambilan Ning Memalen Pampanga Inc. (Kambilan), led by its president Rosve Henson, a former election campaigner of losing gubernatorial candidate Lilia Pineda, launched a recall campaign against Panlilio, on the ground of loss of confidence in the governor's leadership. In the case of Pampanga, the required petitioners must be at least 98,703 which represent 10% of the total number of registered voters in Pampanga as of April 20, 2007, the 2007 Philippine general election. This is based on the records of Commission on Elections, as required by Section 74, RA 7160, and COMELEC Resolution 7505, in relation to ARTICLE X, Sec. 3 and Section 74 of R.A. 7160, LOCAL GOVERNMENT CODE THE LOCAL GOVERNMENT CODE OF THE PHILIPPINES - CHAN ROBLES VIRTUAL LAW LIBRARY, as amended by Section 1, RA 9244.Republic Act No. 9244 Panlilio was the first Pampanga governor to face a recall.

On October 15, 2008, a formal recall petition against Panlilio for loss of confidence was filed with COMELEC. 15,000 "Kambilan" petitioners delivered 168 boxes containing the 224,875 voters' signatures from 20 Pampanga towns and San Fernando. In a 32-page petition, Panlilio moved to dismiss the recall petition.

In February 2010, COMELEC ruled that Lilia Pineda had won the 2007 election. As a result, it ordered Panlilio to step down from as governor, but he only stepped down after he lost to Pineda in the 2010 elections. His term ended on June 30, 2010.

== Post-governorship ==
Panlilio ran once again as governor in the 2013 elections, but he lost once again to incumbent governor Lilia Pineda.

Panlilio ran for vice-governor in the 2025 elections under the Liberal Party with former Candaba mayor Danilo Baylon as his running mate but lost to re-electionist Vice Governor Dennis Pineda.

== Electoral history ==
Electoral history of Eddie Panlilio
Year	Office	Party	Votes received				Result
Year	Office	Party	Total	%	P.	Swing	Result
2007	Governor of Pampanga	Independent	219,706	33.81%	1st	—N/a	Won
2010	Governor of Pampanga	Liberal	242,367	32.74%	2nd	—N/a	Lost
2013	Governor of Pampanga	Liberal	125,761	17.74%	2nd	—N/a	Lost
2025	Vice Governor of Pampanga	Liberal	387,056	34.01%	2nd	—N/a	Lost

Political offices
Preceded by Mark Lapid	Governor of Pampanga; 2007–2010	Succeeded by Lilia Pineda
