= Pampanga Provincial Board =

Legislative body of the province of Pampanga, Philippines

Pampanga Provincial Board Sangguniang Panlalawigan ng Pampanga
- 12th Provincial Board of Pampanga
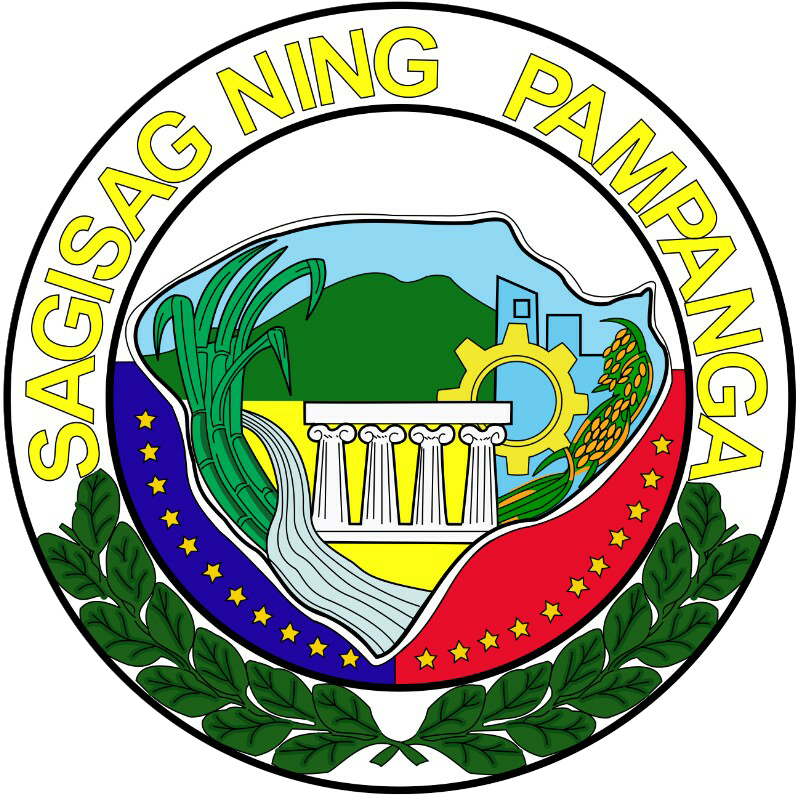
- Seal of the Province of Pampanga

Type
- Type: Unicameral
- Term limits: 3 terms (9 years)

Leadership
- Vice Governor and Presiding Officer: Dennis Pineda, NPC since June 30, 2025

Structure
- Seats: 13 board members 1 ex officio presiding officer
- Political groups: Kambilan (8) Lakas (2) Independent (1) Nonpartisan (2)
- Length of term: 3 years
- Authority: Local Government Code of the Philippines

Elections
- Voting system: Multiple non-transferable vote (regular members); Indirect election (ex officio members)
- Last election: May 12, 2025
- Next election: May 8, 2028

Meeting place
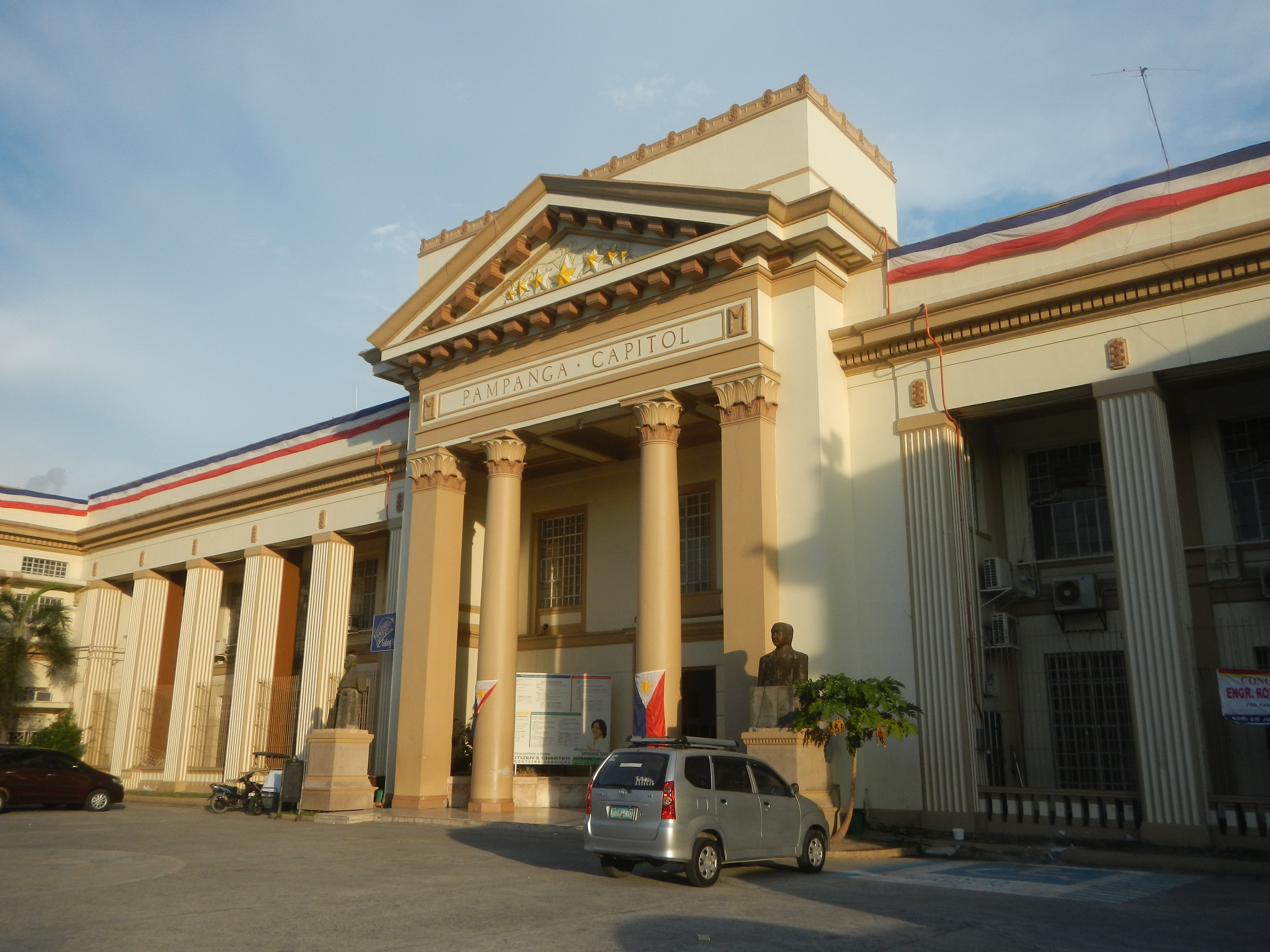
- Pampanga Provincial Capitol, San Fernando

The Pampanga Provincial Board is the Sangguniang Panlalawigan (provincial legislature) of the Philippine province of Pampanga.

The members are elected via plurality-at-large voting: the province is divided into four districts, the first and fourth districts sending two members each, and the second and third districts sending three members each to the provincial board; the number of candidates the electorate votes for and the number of winning candidates depends on the number of members their district sends. The vice governor is the ex officio presiding officer, and only votes to break ties. The vice governor is elected via the plurality voting system province-wide.

The districts used in appropriation of members is coextensive with the legislative districts of Pampanga, with the exception that Angeles City, a highly urbanized city, is excluded in the first district.

Aside from the regular members, the board also includes the provincial federation presidents of the Liga ng mga Barangay (ABC, from its old name "Association of Barangay Captains"), the Sangguniang Kabataan (SK, youth councils) and the Philippine Councilors League (PCL).

== Apportionment ==
Elections	Seats per district				Ex officio seats	Total seats
Elections	1st	2nd	3rd	4th	Ex officio seats	Total seats
2010–present	2	3	3	2	3	13

== List of members ==
=== Current members ===
These are the members after the 2022 Philippine local elections:

- Vice Governor: Dennis Pineda (NPC)

Seat	Board member	Party	Start of term	End of term
1st district	Cherry D. Manalo	Kambilan	June 30, 2025	June 30, 2028
1st district	Christian C. Halili	Kambilan	June 30, 2025	June 30, 2028
2nd district	Olga Frances D. Dizon	Kambilan	June 30, 2019	June 30, 2028
2nd district	Sajid Khan M. Eusoof	Kambilan	June 30, 2022	June 30, 2025
2nd district	Claire D. Lim	Kambilan	June 30, 2025	June 30, 2028
3rd district	Michaeline D. Mercado	Lakas	June 30, 2025	June 30, 2028
3rd district	Lucky Ferdinand V. Labung	Kambilan	June 30, 2022	June 30, 2028
3rd district	Shiwen P. Lim	Independent	June 30, 2025	June 30, 2028
4th district	Kariza P. Naguit	Kambilan	June 30, 2025	June 30, 2028
4th district	Vincent Angelo P. Calara	Lakas	June 30, 2025	June 30, 2028
ABC	Claire D. Lim	Nonpartisan	January 12, 2024	December 31, 2025
PCL	Maynard T. Lapid	NPC	August 18, 2025	June 30, 2028
SK	John Carlo Cruz	Nonpartisan	November 23, 2023	December 31, 2025

=== Vice governor ===
Election year	Name	Party	Ref.
2016	Lilia Pineda	NPC	
2019	Lilia Pineda	Kambilan	
2022	Lilia Pineda	Kambilan	
2025	Dennis Pineda	NPC	

=== 1st district ===
- Population (2024):

Election year	Member (party)	Member (party)	Ref.
2016	Cherry D. Manalo (Kambilan)	Benjamin D. Jocson (Independent)	
2019	Cherry D. Manalo (Kambilan)	Benjamin D. Jocson (Kambilan)	
2022	Krizzanel C. Garbo (NPC)	Benjamin D. Jocson (NPC)	
2025	Cherry D. Manalo (Kambilan)	Christian C. Halili (Kambilan)	

=== 2nd district ===
- Population (2024):

Election year	Member (party)	Member (party)	Member (party)	Ref.
2016	Arthur D. Salalila (Kambilan)	Anthony Torres (Kambilan)	Salvador Dimson, Jr. (Kambilan)	
2019	Mylyn Pineda-Cayabyab (NPC)	Anthony Torres (Kambilan)	Olga Frances D. Dizon (Kambilan)	
2022	Mylyn Pineda-Cayabyab (NPC)	Sajid Khan M. Eusoof (Kambilan)	Olga Frances D. Dizon (NPC)	
2025	Claire D. Lim (Kambilan)	Sajid Khan M. Eusoof (Kambilan)	Olga Frances D. Dizon (Kambilan)	

=== 3rd district ===
- Population (2024):

Election year	Member (party)	Member (party)	Member (party)	Ref.
2016	Ferdinand D. Labung (Kambilan)	Rosve Henson (Kambilan)	Ananias L. Canlas, Jr. (Kambilan)	
2019	Ferdinand D. Labung (NPC)	Rosve Henson (Kambilan)	Ananias L. Canlas, Jr. (Liberal)	
2022	Lucky Ferdinand V. Labung (Kambilan)	Mica Gonzales (Kambilan)	Ananias L. Canlas, Jr. (Aksyon)	
2025	Lucky Ferdinand V. Labung (Kambilan)	Michaeline D. Mercado (Lakas)	Shiwen P. Lim (Independent)	

=== 4th district ===
- Population (2024):

Election year	Member (party)	Member (party)	Ref.
2016	Nelson T. Calara (UNA)	Rolando Balingit (Nacionalista)	
2019	Nelson T. Calara (Kambilan)	Rolando Balingit (PDP–Laban)	
2022	Nelson T. Calara (Kambilan)	Rolando Balingit (Nacionalista)	
2025	Kariza P. Naguit (Kambilan)	Vincent Angelo P. Calara (Lakas)	
