= Lilia Pineda =

Filipino politician and businesswoman (born 1951)

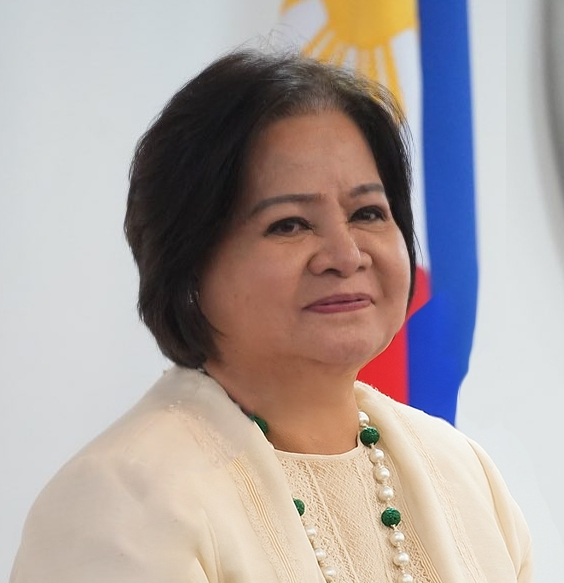
- Pineda in 2025

33rd and 35th Governor of Pampanga
- Incumbent
- Assumed office June 30, 2025
- Vice Governor: Dennis Pineda
- Preceded by: Dennis Pineda
- In office June 30, 2010 – June 30, 2019
- Vice Governor: Yeng Guiao (2010–2013); Dennis Pineda (2013–2019)
- Preceded by: Eddie Panlilio
- Succeeded by: Dennis Pineda

Vice Governor of Pampanga
- In office June 30, 2019 – June 30, 2025
- Governor: Dennis Pineda
- Preceded by: Dennis Pineda
- Succeeded by: Dennis Pineda

Member of the Pampanga Provincial Board from the 2nd district
- In office June 30, 2001 – June 30, 2007 Serving with Liberty Lim (2001–2007); Edna David (2001–2004); Eduardo Chu (2004–2007)

22nd Mayor of Lubao
- In office June 30, 1992 – June 30, 2001
- Preceded by: Conrado Jimenez
- Succeeded by: Dennis Pineda

Personal details
- Born: Lilia Paule Garcia; February 21, 1951 (age 75) Lubao, Pampanga, Philippines
- Party: NPC (2003–2004; 2024–present); KAMBILAN (local party; 2012–present)
- Other political affiliations: NUP (2011–2024); KAMPI (2007–2008); Lakas (2004–2011); NPK (2003–2004); Independent (until 2003)
- Spouse: Bong Pineda
- Children: 5, including Dennis, Mylyn and Esmeralda
- Education: José Rizal College

Lilia Garcia Pineda (born Lilia Paule Garcia; February 20, 1951), also known as Nanay Lilia, is a Filipino politician and businesswoman who is the incumbent governor of Pampanga since 2025, previously serving from 2010 to 2019. She also served as Vice Governor of Pampanga under her son Dennis Pineda from 2019 to 2025. and as Mayor of Lubao from 1992 until 2001. Pineda was a close ally of Gloria Macapagal-Arroyo during the latter's presidency from 2001 to 2010.

She established the local party, Kapanalig at Kambilan ning Memalen Pampanga (Kambilan) in 2012.

== Early life and education ==
Pineda was born on February 20, 1951 in Lubao to Sisenando Garcia and Rosario Paule. She studied at the José Rizal College.

== Political career ==
In 1992, Pineda was elected as mayor of Lubao where she served for three consecutive terms. In 2001, Pineda became a member of the Pampanga Provincial Board for two terms.

In 2007, Pineda ran for governor of Pampanga but lost to Eddie Panlilio by a narrow margin of 1,147 votes out of over 600,000 votes cast. Following an appeal and a recount, the COMELEC ruled that Pineda had won. As a result, it ordered Panlilio to step down from as governor, but he only stepped down after he lost to Pineda in the 2010 elections.

In 2019, Pineda was elected as vice governor of Pampanga after her son Dennis Pineda succeeded her.

In 2025, Pineda returned as governor of Pampanga after she succeeded her son.

== Personal life ==
Pineda is married to businessman Bong Pineda and has five children including Dennis, Mylyn and Esmeralda.

== Electoral history ==
=== 2025 ===
2025 Pampanga gubernatorial election
Candidate	Party	Votes	%
Lilia Pineda	Kambilan	709,694	59.48
Danilo Baylon	Independent	476,642	39.95
Amado Santos	Independent	6,864	0.58
Total		1,193,200	100.00
Source: Commission on Elections

=== 2022 ===
2022 Pampanga vice gubernatorial election
Candidate	Party	Votes	%
Lilia Pineda (incumbent)	Kambilan	895,160	100.00
Total		895,160	100.00
Total votes		1,201,852	–
Registered voters/turnout		1,374,651	87.43
Kambilan hold			
Source: Commission on Elections

=== 2019 ===
2019 Pampanga vice gubernatorial election
Party	Candidate	Votes	%
KAMBILAN	Lilia Pineda (incumbent)	808,015	100.00
Total votes		808,015	100.00
KAMBILAN hold			

=== 2016 ===
2016 Pampanga gubernatorial election
Party	Candidate	Votes	%
KAMBILAN	Lilia Pineda (incumbent)	737,481	100.00
Total votes		737,481	100.00
KAMBILAN hold			

=== 2013 ===
2013 Pampanga gubernatorial election
Party	Candidate	Votes	%
KAMBILAN	Lilia Pineda (incumbent)	594,011	78.91
Liberal	Ed Panlilio	148,376	19.71
Independent	Jose Montemayor Jr.	6,262	0.83
Independent	Joe Ocampo	4,110	0.55
Total votes		752,759	100.00
KAMBILAN hold			

=== 2010 ===
2010 Pampanga gubernatorial election
Party	Candidate	Votes	%
Lakas–Kampi	Lilia Pineda	488,521	65.98
Liberal	Eddie Panlilio (incumbent)	242,367	32.74
Independent	Ricardo Ocampo, Sr.	9,479	1.28
Total votes		802,667	100.00
Lakas–Kampi gain from Liberal			

=== 2007 ===
2007 Pampanga gubernatorial election
Candidate	Party	Votes	%
Eddie Panlilio	Independent	219,706	33.81
Lilia Pineda	Kabalikat ng Malayang Pilipino	218,559	33.63
Mark Lapid (incumbent)	Lakas–CMD	210,875	32.45
Edna Guillermo	Independent	304	0.05
Elly Pamatong	Kilusang Bagong Lipunan	300	0.05
Arnold Maniago	Independent	107	0.02
Total		649,851	100.00
Independent gain from Lakas–CMD			

Political offices
Preceded by Dennis Pineda	Governor of Pampanga; 2025–present	Incumbent
Preceded by Dennis Pineda	Vice Governor of Pampanga; 2019–2025	Succeeded by Dennis Pineda
Preceded by Eddie Panlilio	Governor of Pampanga; 2010–2019	Succeeded by Dennis Pineda
Preceded by Conrado Jimenez	Mayor of Lubao; 1992–2001	Succeeded by Dennis Pineda
Party political offices
New political party	Chairman of Kambilan; 2012–present	Incumbent
