= Dennis Pineda =

Filipino politician and businessman (born 1974)

- Pineda in 2026

Vice Governor of Pampanga
- Incumbent
- Assumed office June 30, 2025
- Governor: Lilia Pineda
- Preceded by: Lilia Pineda
- In office June 30, 2013 – June 30, 2019
- Governor: Lilia Pineda
- Preceded by: Yeng Guiao
- Succeeded by: Lilia Pineda

34th Governor of Pampanga
- In office June 30, 2019 – June 30, 2025
- Vice Governor: Lilia Pineda
- Preceded by: Lilia Pineda
- Succeeded by: Lilia Pineda

23rd Mayor of Lubao
- In office June 30, 2001 – June 30, 2010
- Vice Mayor: Salvador Dimson Jr.
- Preceded by: Lilia Pineda
- Succeeded by: Mylyn Pineda-Cayabyab

Member of the Lubao Municipal Council
- In office June 30, 1998 – June 30, 2001

Personal details
- Born: Dennis Garcia Pineda; May 6, 1974 (age 52) Quezon City, Philippines
- Party: NPC (2004–2007; 2011–present); KAMBILAN (local party; 2012–present)
- Other political affiliations: Lakas–Kampi (2008–2011); KAMPI (2007–2008); Independent (until 2004)
- Spouse: Yolly Miranda (m. 1997)
- Children: 4
- Parent(s): Bong Pineda (father); Lilia Pineda (mother)
- Relatives: Mylyn Pineda-Cayabyab (sister); Esmeralda Pineda (sister)
- Education: Guagua National Colleges (BS)
- Occupation: Politician, basketball coach, businessman
- Basketball career

Converge FiberXers
- Position: Head coach
- League: PBA
- Coaching career: 2018–present

Career history

Coaching
- 2018–2024: Pampanga Giant Lanterns
- 2019–2022: Pampanga Delta
- 2022–2024: Pampanga Giant Lanterns
- 2024–2025: Converge FiberXers (assistant)
- 2025–present: Converge FiberXers

Career highlights
- 2× MPBL champion (2023, 2024); 2× MPBL Coach of the Year (2023, 2024); 3× NBL Philippines champion (2020, 2021, 2022)

Dennis "Delta" Garcia Pineda (born May 6, 1974) is a Filipino politician, businessman and basketball head coach from Pampanga. He currently serves as the Vice Governor of Pampanga since 2025, previously holding the office from 2013 to 2019. He also previously served as Governor of Pampanga from 2019 to 2025. He also served as the mayor of Lubao from 2001 until 2010.

He is current head coach for the Converge FiberXers in the Philippine Basketball Association (PBA).

== Early life and education ==
Dennis Garcia Pineda was born on May 6, 1974, in Quezon City to a prominent political family in Pampanga. He is the only son of businessman Bong Pineda and politician Lilia Garcia Pineda.

He attended at the Guagua National Colleges finishing his secondary education 1991 and later obtaining a commerce degree, majoring in management in 1997 from the same institution.

== Political career ==
Pineda became a municipal councilor of Lubao from 1998 to 2001.

He served three consecutive terms as mayor of Lubao from 2001 to 2010.

He then served as vice governor of Pampanga from 2013 to 2019.

Pineda was elected as governor of Pampanga in the 2019 election. He succeeded his mother Lilia Pineda who was elected as vice governor in the same vote.

The aftermath of the 2025 election saw Pineda being elected again as vice governor with his mother reelected as governor.

== Coaching career ==
In sport, he is also the head coach of various Pampanga-based basketball teams, most notably, the Pampanga Giant Lanterns of the Maharlika Pilipinas Basketball League. In 2023, he brought the Giant Lanterns to their first MPBL Finals appearance, and later, their first MPBL championship.

In September 2025, Pineda became the head coach for the Converge FiberXers of the Philippine Basketball Association.

== Personal life ==
Pineda is married to Yolanda "Yolly" Miranda and has four children. Miranda herself has served as mayor of her hometown of Santa Rita, Pampanga from 2010 to 2016.

== Electoral history ==
=== 2025 ===
2025 Pampanga vice gubernatorial election
Candidate	Party	Votes	%
Dennis Pineda	Nationalist People's Coalition	751,077	65.99
Eddie Panlilio	Liberal Party	387,056	34.01
Total		1,138,133	100.00
Source: Commission on Elections

=== 2022 ===
2022 Pampanga gubernatorial election
Candidate	Party	Votes	%
Dennis Pineda (incumbent)	Nationalist People's Coalition	668,787	58.95
Danilo Baylon	Liberal Party	465,704	41.05
Total		1,134,491	100.00
Total votes		1,201,852	–
Registered voters/turnout		1,374,651	87.43
Nationalist People's Coalition hold			
Source: Commission on Elections

=== 2019 ===
2019 Pampanga gubernatorial election
Party	Candidate	Votes	%
NPC	Dennis Pineda	656,784	
Independent	Jomar Hizon	229,067	
Independent	James Escoto	5,778	
Independent	Amado Santos	4,954	
Total votes			
NPC hold			

=== 2016 ===
2016 Pampanga vice gubernatorial election
Party	Candidate	Votes	%
NPC	Dennis Pineda	649,425	
Total votes			
NPC hold			

=== 2013 ===
2013 Pampanga vice gubernatorial election
Party	Candidate	Votes	%
NPC	Dennis Pineda	404,947	57.11
Liberal	Maria Amalia Tiglao	157,207	22.17
Invalid or blank votes		146,943	20.72
Total votes		709,097	100.00

Political offices
Preceded by Lilia Pineda	Vice Governor of Pampanga; 2025–present	Incumbent
Preceded by Lilia Pineda	Governor of Pampanga; 2019–2025	Succeeded by Lilia Pineda
Preceded by Yeng Guiao	Vice Governor of Pampanga; 2013–2019	Succeeded by Lilia Pineda
Preceded by Lilia Pineda	Mayor of Lubao; 2001–2010	Succeeded by Mylyn Cayabyab
