= List of vice governors of Pampanga =

Vice Governor of Pampanga
- Incumbent; Dennis Pineda since June 30, 2025
- Seat: Pampanga Provincial Capitol
- Nominator: Political party
- Appointer: Elected via popular vote
- Term length: 3 years

The Vice Governor of Pampanga (Filipino: Pangalawang Punong Lalawigan ng Pampanga) is the presiding officer of the Sangguniang Panlalawigan, the legislature of the provincial government of Pampanga, Philippines.

== List of Vice Governors ==
Image	Vice Governor	Term
	Rodolfo Hizon	1959–1963
	Angel Macapagal	1963–1965
	Amado Castillo	1965–1967
	Rodolfo Hizon	1967–1971
	Cicero Punsalan	1980–1984
	Robin Nepomuceno	1986–1987
	Cielo Macapagal Salgado	1988–1992
	Lito Lapid	1992–1995
	Cielo Macapagal Salgado	1995–1998
	Clayton Olalia	1998–2001
	Mikey Arroyo	2001–2004
	Yeng Guiao	2004–2013
	Dennis Pineda	2013–2019
	Lilia Pineda	2019–2025
	Dennis Pineda	2025–present

== See also ==
- Governor of Pampanga
