= 2013 San Fernando, Pampanga, local elections =

Philippine elections

- May 13, 2013
- Mayoral election
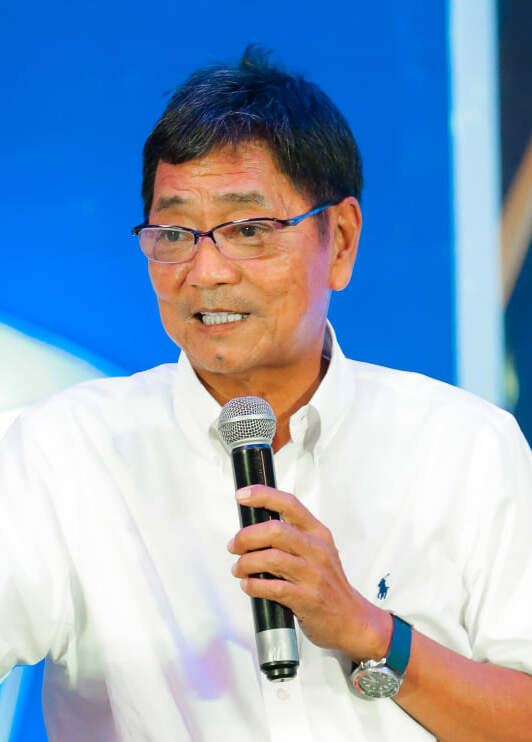

Nominee	Edwin Santiago	Reynaldo Aquino
Party	Liberal	PDP–Laban
Alliance	Team Magsilbi Tamu	Team Fernandino
Running mate	Renato Agustin	Raul Macalino
Popular vote	51,885	37,969
Percentage	55.18%	40.38%
Mayor before election
Oscar Samson Rodriguez
Liberal
Elected mayor
Edwin Santiago
Liberal
- Vice mayoral election
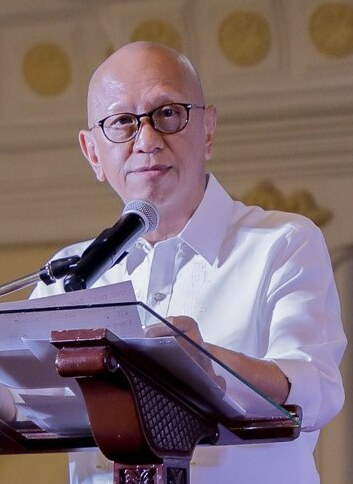
		PDP
Nominee	Jaime Lazatin	Raul Macalino
Party	UNA	PDP–Laban
Alliance		Team Fernandino
Popular vote	37,369	24,375
Percentage	40.38%	25.93%
Vice Mayor before election
Edwin Santiago
Lakas
Elected Vice Mayor
Jaime Lazatin
UNA

Local elections were held in the city of San Fernando in Pampanga on May 13, 2013, in conjunction with the 2013 Philippine midterm elections. Registered voters of the city were electing candidates for the following elective local posts: city mayor, city vice mayor, and ten councilors.

== Background ==
Both incumbent mayor Oscar Samson Rodriguez and vice mayor Edwin Santiago have served their third terms, thus, are term limited. Rodriguez will return and will run for Congress for the third district of Pampanga, facing the incumbent Aurelio Gonzales Jr.

On October 1, 2012, the returning and first city mayor, Dr. Rey B. Aquino, filed his first certificate of candidacy in COMELEC office, together with their 10 candidates for city councilors under the banner of Team Fernandino.

== Results ==
Names in boldface denote re-electionist candidates.

The candidates for mayor and vice mayor with the highest number of votes win their respective seats. They are elected separately; therefore, they may be of different parties when elected.

=== Mayor ===
City of San Fernando Mayoral Election
Party	Candidate	Votes	%
**Liberal**	**Edwin Santiago**	**51,885**	**55.18%**
PDP–Laban	Reynaldo Aquino	37,969	40.38%
Invalid or blank votes		4,167	4.43%
Total votes		**94,021**	**100.00%**

=== Vice Mayor ===
City of San Fernando Vice Mayoral Election
Party	Candidate	Votes	%
**UNA**	**Jaime Lazatin**	**37,369**	**40.38%**
PDP–Laban	Raul Macalino	24,375	25.93%
Liberal	Renato Agustin	21,709	23.09%
Invalid or blank votes		9,968	10.60%
Total votes		**94,021**	**100.00%**

== City Councilors ==
Voting is via plurality-at-large voting: Voters will vote for ten (10) candidates and the ten candidates with the highest number of votes are elected.

Of the incumbent councilors elected in 2010, six are not seeking re-election for various reasons:

- **Renato Agustin**, who is graduating and is running for vice mayor under the Liberal Party,
- **Rosemary Calimlim**, who is graduating;
- **Ruperto Dumlao**, who is graduating;
- **Redentor Halili**, who is graduating;
- **Jaime Lazatin**, who is graduating and is running for vice mayor under the United Nationalist Alliance; and
- **Alex Patio**, who is one of the nominees of party-list group Append Inc.

=== Candidates ===
==== Administration coalition (Team Magsilbi Tamu) ====
Liberal Party (Philippines)/Team Magsilbi Tamu
Name	Party
Jacklyn Rachelle Calimlim	Liberal
Bernie Castro	Liberal
Celestino Dizon	Liberal
**Ralph Dein Henson**	Liberal
Nelson Lingat	Liberal
**Joselito Ocampo**	Liberal
Allan Patio	Liberal
Harvey Quiwa	Liberal
Enerito Sason	Liberal
**Noel Tulabut**	Liberal

==== Primary opposition coalition (Team Fernandino) ====
Partido Demokratiko Pilipino-Lakas ng Bayan/Team Fernandino
Name	Party
Purificacion Bamba	PDP–Laban
Jesus Cuyugan	PDP–Laban
Bong David	PDP–Laban
Russel Halili	PDP–Laban
Angelica Hizon	PDP–Laban
Benedict Lagman	PDP–Laban
**Ayzel Mari Macalino**	PDP–Laban
Jep Miranda	PDP–Laban
Jay Patio	PDP–Laban
Raymundo Pekson Jr.	PDP–Laban

==== Independent candidates not in tickets ====
Independent
Name	Party
Ivan Alcarioto	Independent
Edison David	Independent
Ernesto Dumas	Independent
Jose Quiwa III	Independent

=== Results ===
City of San Fernando Council Election
Party	Candidate	Votes	%
**PDP–Laban**	**Angelica Hizon**	**49,400**	**52.54**
**Liberal**	**Ralph Dein Henson**	**47,697**	**50.73**
**Liberal**	**Noel Tulabut**	**43,104**	**45.85**
**PDP–Laban**	**Benedict Lagman**	**40,419**	**42.99**
**PDP–Laban**	**Ayzel Mari Macalino**	**36,367**	**38.68**
**Liberal**	**Nelson Lingat**	**35,760**	**38.03**
**Liberal**	**Celestino Dizon**	**35,553**	**37.81**
**Liberal**	**Harvey Quiwa**	**35,474**	**37.73**
**Liberal**	**Joselito Ocampo**	**35,433**	**37.69**
**Liberal**	**Jacklyn Rachelle Calimlim**	**28,370**	**30.17**
Liberal	Enerito Sason	26,884	28.59
PDP–Laban	Jesus Cuyugan	26,373	28.05
Liberal	Allan Patio	25,897	27.54
PDP–Laban	Jep Miranda	25,842	27.49
PDP–Laban	Jay Patio	25,361	26.97
Liberal	Bernie Castro	24,824	26.40
PDP–Laban	Purificacion Bamba	23,225	24.73
PDP–Laban	Bong David	15,399	16.38
PDP–Laban	Russel Halili	15,286	16.26
PDP–Laban	Raymundo Pekson Jr.	14,629	15.56
Independent	Ivan Alcarioto	13,985	14.87
Independent	Ernesto Dumas	11,917	12.67
Independent	Jose Quiwa III	11,654	12.40
Independent	Edison David	3,749	3.99
Total votes		**94,021**	**100.00**
