= Mylyn Pineda-Cayabyab =

Filipino politician and businesswoman (born 1982)

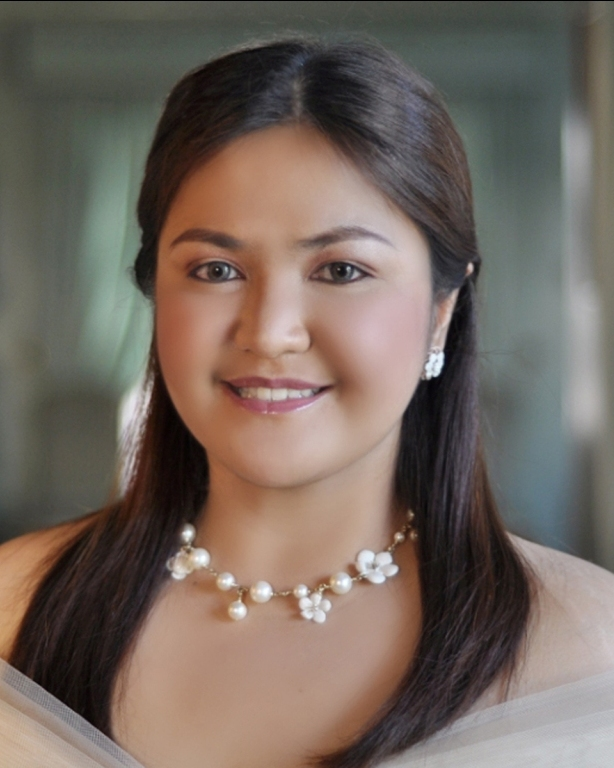
- Official portrait, 2010

Member of the Pampanga Provincial Board from the 2nd District
- In office June 30, 2019 – April 15, 2024 Serving with Fritzie David Dizon (2019–2024); Sajid Khan Eusoof (2022–2024); Tonton Torres (2019–2022)

24th Mayor of Lubao
- In office June 30, 2010 – June 30, 2019
- Vice Mayor: Robertito Diaz
- Preceded by: Dennis Pineda
- Succeeded by: Esmeralda Pineda

Personal details
- Born: Mylyn Garcia Pineda; May 6, 1982 (age 44) San Fernando, Pampanga, Philippines
- Party: NPC (2018–present); KAMBILAN (local party; 2012–present)
- Other political affiliations: Lakas (2009–2012)
- Spouse: Archen Cayabyab
- Children: 1
- Parent(s): Bong Pineda (father); Lilia Pineda (mother)
- Relatives: Dennis Pineda (brother); Esmeralda Pineda (sister)
- Education: Miriam College
- Occupation: Politician, businesswoman

Mylyn Pineda-Cayabyab (born Mylyn Garcia Pineda; May 6, 1982) is a Filipino politician and businesswoman who served as board member of the 2nd District of Pampanga from 2019 to 2024. She served as Mayor of Lubao from 2010 to 2019.

== Early life and education ==
Pineda-Cayabyab was born on May 6, 1982, in San Fernando, Pampanga to Bong Pineda and Lilia Garcia as their fourth child. She is a graduate of Miriam College.

== Political career ==
=== Mayor of Lubao (2010–2019) ===
In 2010, Pineda-Cayabyab was elected as mayor of Lubao until 2019.

=== Pampanga Provincial Board (2019–2024) ===
Pineda-Cayabyab became a board member of the Pampanga's 2nd district in 2019.

=== 2025 San Fernando, Pampanga mayoralty bid ===
In 2025, Pineda-Cayabyab resigned as board member to run for mayor of San Fernando, Pampanga but she lost to Vilma Caluag in a landslide defeat and garnered only 49,061 votes with her slate of councilors being wiped out.

== Personal life ==
She is married to Archen Cayabyab, board governor of the Converge FiberXers since 2023. They have one child.

== Electoral history ==
Electoral history of Mylyn Pineda-Cayabyab
Year	Office	Party		Votes received				Result
Year	Office	Local	National	Total	%	P.	Swing	Result
2010	Mayor of Lubao	—N/a	Lakas–Kampi	47,515	—N/a	1st	—N/a	Unopposed
2013	Mayor of Lubao	KAMBILAN	—N/a	40,521	86.24%	1st	—N/a	Unopposed
2016	Mayor of Lubao	KAMBILAN	—N/a	49,545	—N/a	1st	—N/a	Unopposed
2019	Board Member (Pampanga–2nd)	KAMBILAN	NPC	172,984	—N/a	1st	—N/a	Won
2022	Board Member (Pampanga–2nd)	KAMBILAN	NPC	175,951	33.49%	1st	—N/a	Won
2025	Mayor of San Fernando, Pampanga	KAMBILAN	NPC	49,061	23.65%	2nd	—N/a	Lost

Political offices
Preceded by Dennis Pineda	Mayor of Lubao; 2010–2019	Succeeded by Esmeralda Pineda
