= Cuyugan =

Cuyugan is a Kapampangan language surname meaning "friendship". It comes from the Pampango word cuyug, meaning "friend", "chum" or "comrade". Notable people with the surname include:

- Fides Cuyugan-Asensio (born 1931), Filipino coloratura soprano, director, librettist, TV host, translator, and teacher
- Justin Cuyugan (born 1980), Filipino actor
- Vivencio Cuyugan (1895–1971), Filipino politician and boxer
- Marvin Agustin (born 1979), Filipino actor, chef and entrepreneur
- Bryan Matthew Cuyugan Nepomuceno (born 1980), Filipino lawyer, politician and businessman
