= Mayor of San Fernando, Pampanga =

Local chief executive of San Fernando, Pampanga, Philippines

- Punong Lungsod ning San Fernando
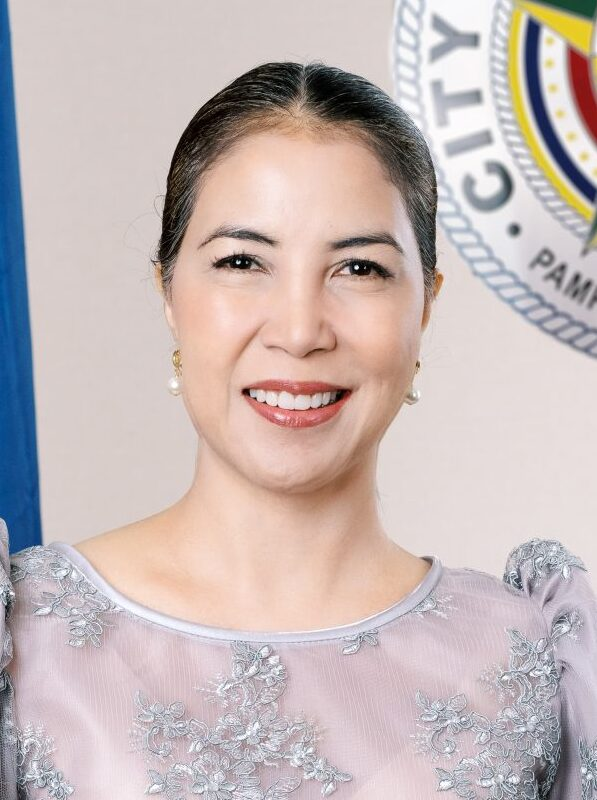
- Incumbent; Vilma Caluag since June 30, 2022
- Style: The Honorable
- Seat: Heroes Hall of the City of San Fernando, Pampanga
- Appointer: Elected via popular vote
- Term length: 3 years, not eligible for re-election immediately after three consecutive terms
- Inaugural holder: Vidal de Arrozal (as Capitanes Municipales); Vicente Dizon (as Alcaldes Municipales); Vicente Dizon (as Gobernadorcillo); Antonio E. Consunji (as Presidentes Municipales); Francisco S. Hizon (as Municipal President); Urbano D. Dizon (as Municipal Mayor); Rey Aquino (as City Mayor)
- Formation: 1755 (as Capitanes Municipales); 1821 (as Alcaldes Municipales); 1825 (as Gobernadorcillo); 1891 (as Presidentes Municipales); 1901 (as Municipal President); 1934 (as Municipal Mayor); 2001 (as City Mayor)
- Website: https://cityofsanfernando.gov.ph/

The mayor of San Fernando (Kapampangan: Punong Lungsod ning San Fernando) is the head of the local government of the city of San Fernando City, Pampanga who is elected to three year terms. The Mayor is also the executive head and leads the city's departments in executing the city ordinances and improving public services. The city mayor is restricted to three consecutive terms, totaling nine years, although a mayor can be elected again after an interruption of one term.

== List ==
=== Capitanes Municipales (1755–1820) ===
- Vidal de Arrozal – 1755
- Tiburcio Cunanan – 1756
- Vidal de Arrozal – 1757
- Luis Catacutan – 1758
- Juan David – 1759
- Juan Yutuc – 1760
- Domingo de Vera – 1761
- Nicolas Capati – 1762
- Tomas Aquino – 1763
- Miguel de los Angeles – 1764
- Agustin Dizon – 1765
- Manuel Manaloto – 1766
- Francisco Bautista – 1767
- Miguel David – 1768
- Nicolas Dizon – 1769
- Mariano Singian de Miranda – 1770
- Mateo David – 1771
- Bernardo de Anunciacion – 1772
- Francisco David – 1773
- Agapito Singian – 1774
- Vicente Concepcion – 1775
- Eugenio Yutuc – 1776
- Juan Lingat – 1777
- Juan Lacson – 1778
- Vicente Concepcion – 1779
- Jose de Arrozal – 1780
- Nicolas Tuason – 1781
- Carlos Catacutan – 1782
- Vicente David – 1783
- Lucas David – 1784
- Antonio Alonso del Rosario – 1785
- Regino de Castro – 1786
- Sebastian Manarang – 1787
- Bernabe Pamintuan – 1788
- Juan Dizon – 1789
- Manuel Miranda – 1790
- Vicente Dayrit – 1791
- Nicolas Tuason – 1792
- Jose de los Angeles – 1793
- Vicente Quizon – 1794
- Angel Pantaleon de Miranda – 1795
- Vicente Dayrit – 1796
- Jose Cunanan – 1797
- Juan Lacson – 1798
- Carlos Catacutan – 1799
- Vicente Dizon – 1800
- Jose Ocson – 1801
- Agustin David Lising – 1802
- Jose Concepcion – 1803
- Raymundo David – 1804
- Ignacio David de Miranda – 1805
- Severino Henson – 1806
- Juan Crisostomo Paras – 1807
- Domingo Henson – 1808
- Leon de Vera – 1809
- Vicente de Castro – 1810
- Gregorio Singian – 1811
- Ignacio de Miranda – 1812
- Miguel Catacutan – 1813
- Francisco Pamintuan – 1814
- Severino Henson – 1815
- Agustin David Lising – 1816
- Bernardo David – 1817
- Bernardo Tinio – 1818
- Eriberto Yutuc – 1819
- Vicente de Castro– 1820

=== Alcaldes Municipales (1821–1824) ===
- Vicente Dizon – 1821
- Pablo de Ocampo – 1822
- Maximo Dizon – 1823
- Ciriaco Dizon – 1824

=== Gobernadorcillos (1825–1890) ===
- Vicente Dizon – 1825
- Manuel Pasion Henson – 1826
- Anacleto del Rosario – 1827
- Vicente David Lising – 1828
- Vicente Dizon – 1829
- Pablo Ocampo – 1830
- Doroteo Dizon – 1831
- Mariano Yutuc – 1832
- Manuel Pasion Henson – 1833
- Gregorio Tuason – 1834
- Blas Borja – 1835
- Doroteo Dizon – 1836
- Agustin Pamintuan – 1837
- Agustin Cuyugan – 1838
- Juan Dayrit – 1839
- Raymundo David – 1840
- Macario Yutuc – 1841
- Matias Quiason – 1842
- Pedro Lacsamana – 1843
- Bernardino Singian de Miranda – 1844
- Serapio Singian de Miranda – 1845
- Mariano Arceo – 1846
- Agustin Cuyugan – 1847
- Guillermo Henson – 1848
- Bernardino Singian de Miranda – 1849
- Agustin Pamintuan – 1850
- Gregorio David – 1851
- Maximo Feliciano – 1852
- Paulino Paras – 1853–1854
- Agustin Lacson – 1854–1855
- Simon Henson – 1855–1856
- Cosme Lacson – 1856–1857
- Candido Froilan Dizon – 1857–1858
- Florentino Dayrit – 1858–1859
- Manuel Pasion Henson – 1859
- Jose Navarro (accidental) – 1859
- Victor David – 1860
- Manuel de Ocampo – 1860–1861
- Bernardino Singian de Miranda – 1861–1862
- Guillermo Henson – 1862–1863
- Aniceto Yusi – 1863–1864
- Simon Henson – 1864–1865
- Juan Quiason – 1865–1866
- Julian Buison – 1867–1868
- Benigno de Ocampo – 1868–1869
- Isidro Teopaco – 1869–1870
- Domiciano Tison – 1870–1871
- Florentino Dayrit – 1871–1872
- Eustaquio Ricafort – 1872–1873
- Pedro Paras y Castro – 1873–1874
- Bernardino Singian de Miranda – 1874–1875
- Julian Buison – 1875–1876
- Anacleto Hizon – 1877–1879
- Catalino Henson – 1879–1880
- Mariano Custodio – 1880–1881
- Saturnino Henson – 1881–1882
- Florentino Dayrit – 1882–1883
- Pedro Paras – 1883
- Domiciano Tison – 1884–1885
- Francisco X. Panlilio – 1885
- Anacleto Hizon – 1886–1887
- Teodoro Limjuco – 1887–1889
- Gregorio Tioleco – 1889–1890

=== Presidentes Municipales (1891–1898) ===
- Antonio E. Consunji – 1891–1892
- Juan Sengson – 1893–1894
- Teodoro Limjuco – 1895
- Celso Dayrit (accidental) – 1897
- Antonio E. Consunji – 1898

=== Alcaldes (1899–1901) ===
- Enrique Kerr – 1899
- Carlos Kerr – 1900
- Teodoro Limjuco – 1900
- Francisco S. Hizon – 1900–1901

=== Municipal Presidents (1901–1934) ===
- Francisco S. Hizon – 1901
- Mariano J. Leon Santos – 1902–1903
- Juan Sengson – 1904
- Eulalio Castro – 1905–1906
- Vicente Tiomico – 1906–1907
- Pedro Teopaco – 1908–1909
- Clemente Ocampo – 1910–1912
- Antonio B. Abad Santos – 1916–1921
- Jose M. Valencia – 1922–1927
- Antonio B. Abad Santos – 1928–1931
- Jose M. Valencia – 1932–1934

=== Municipal Mayors (1934–2001) ===
- Urbano D. Dizon – 1934–1937
- Vivencio Cuyugan – 1938–1942
- Rodolfo P. Hizon – 1942–1945
- Vivencio Cuyugan – 1945
- Rodolfo P. Hizon – 1946–1955
- Mariano P. Castro, Sr. – 1955
- Miguel G. Baluyut – 1956–1959
- Jose C. Quiwa – 1960–1967
- Levi Panlilio – 1967–1969
- Virgilio L. Sanchez – 1969–1971
- Luis Gopiao – 1971
- Armando P. Biliwang – 1972–1980
- Amante S. Bueno – 1980–1982
- Vicente A. Macalino – 1982–1983
- Virgilio L. Sanchez – 1983–1986
- Paterno S. Guevarra (appointed) – 1986–1987
- Rodolfo P. Canlas (appointed) – 1987–1988
- Paterno S. Guevarra – 1988–1995
- Rey Aquino – 1995–2001

=== City Mayors (2001–present) ===
Image	Mayor	Term
	Rey Aquino	2001–2004
	Oscar Samson Rodriguez	2004–2013
	Edwin Santiago	2013–2022
	Vilma P. Balle-Caluag	2022 – present

== Vice Mayor ==
Vice Mayor of San Fernando, Pampanga
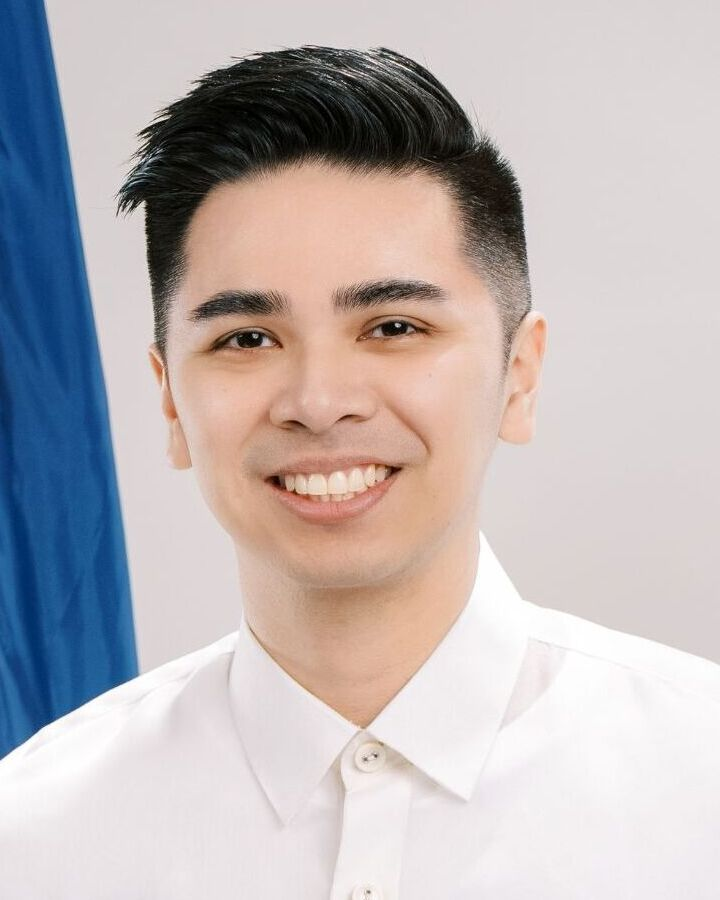
- Incumbent; Brenz Gonzales since June 30, 2025
- Style: The Honorable
- Appointer: Elected via popular vote
- Term length: 3 years, not eligible for re-election immediately after three consecutive terms

The vice mayor is the second-highest official in the city. The vice mayor is elected via popular vote; although most mayoral candidates have running mates, the vice mayor is elected separately from the mayor. This can result in the mayor and the vice mayor coming from different political parties.

The vice mayor is the presiding officer of the San Fernando City Council. The vice mayor can only vote as the tiebreaker. When a mayor is removed from office, the vice mayor becomes the mayor until the scheduled next election.

=== List of Vice Mayor ===
Portrait	Vice Mayor	Term
	Eligio Lagman	1995–2004
	Edwin Santiago	2004–2013
	Jaime Lazatin	2013–2022
	Benedict Jasper Lagman	2022–2025
	Brenz Gonzales	2025 – present

== Elections ==
- 2001 San Fernando, Pampanga, local elections
- 2004 San Fernando, Pampanga, local elections
- 2007 San Fernando, Pampanga, local elections
- 2010 San Fernando, Pampanga, local elections
- 2013 San Fernando, Pampanga, local elections
- 2016 San Fernando, Pampanga, local elections
- 2019 San Fernando, Pampanga, local elections
- 2022 San Fernando, Pampanga, local elections
- 2025 San Fernando, Pampanga, local elections
