= Mica Gonzales =

Filipino politician and business executive (born 1993)

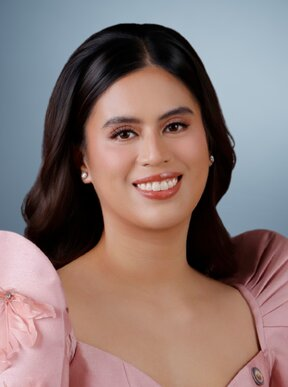
- Official portrait, 2025

House Deputy Majority Leader
- Incumbent
- Assumed office July 29, 2025

Member of the House of Representatives from Pampanga’s 3rd district
- Incumbent
- Assumed office June 30, 2025
- Preceded by: Aurelio Gonzales Jr.

Member of the Pampanga Provincial Board from the 3rd District
- In office June 30, 2022 – June 30, 2025 Serving with Ananias Canlas Jr. and Lucky Labung

Personal details
- Born: Alyssa Michaela Mercado Gonzales; September 11, 1993 (age 33) Mandaluyong, Philippines
- Party: Lakas (2024–present)
- Other political affiliations: KAMBILAN (2021–2024)
- Parent: Aurelio Gonzales Jr. (father)
- Relatives: Brenz Gonzales (half-brother)
- Education: University of Asia and the Pacific (BSBA); Ateneo Law School (dropped out)
- Occupation: Politician, business executive

Alyssa Michaela "Mica" Mercado Gonzales (born September 11, 1993) is a Filipino politician and business executive serving as the current representative of Pampanga's 3rd congressional district since 2025. She is a member of the Lakas–CMD political party and the daughter of former representative and Senior Deputy Speaker Aurelio Gonzales Jr.

Prior to her election to Congress, Gonzales served as a member of the Pampanga Provincial Board representing the 3rd District from June 30, 2022, to June 30, 2025. She also previously worked in the private sector as the Corporate Treasurer and Chief Financial Officer (CFO) of her family's construction firm, AD Gonzales Jr. Construction & Trading Co., Inc.

== Early life and education ==
Gonzales was born on September 11, 1993, in Mandaluyong to Aurelio Gonzales Jr. and Michaeline Mercado. Her half-brother is Brenz Gonzales, who is the current vice mayor of San Fernando, Pampanga. She studied at the University of Nebraska–Lincoln in the United States for high school and earned a degree in Business Administration (Management) from the University of Asia and the Pacific in Pasig. She also studied law at the Ateneo Law School but did not complete the degree.

== Early career ==
Before entering politics, Gonzales worked in human resources and marketing roles at Rockwell Land and Abbott Laboratories and trained in mall operations at SM Supermalls. She later joined her family's business as Corporate Treasurer and CFO of AD Gonzales Jr. Construction & Trading Co., Inc.

== Political career ==
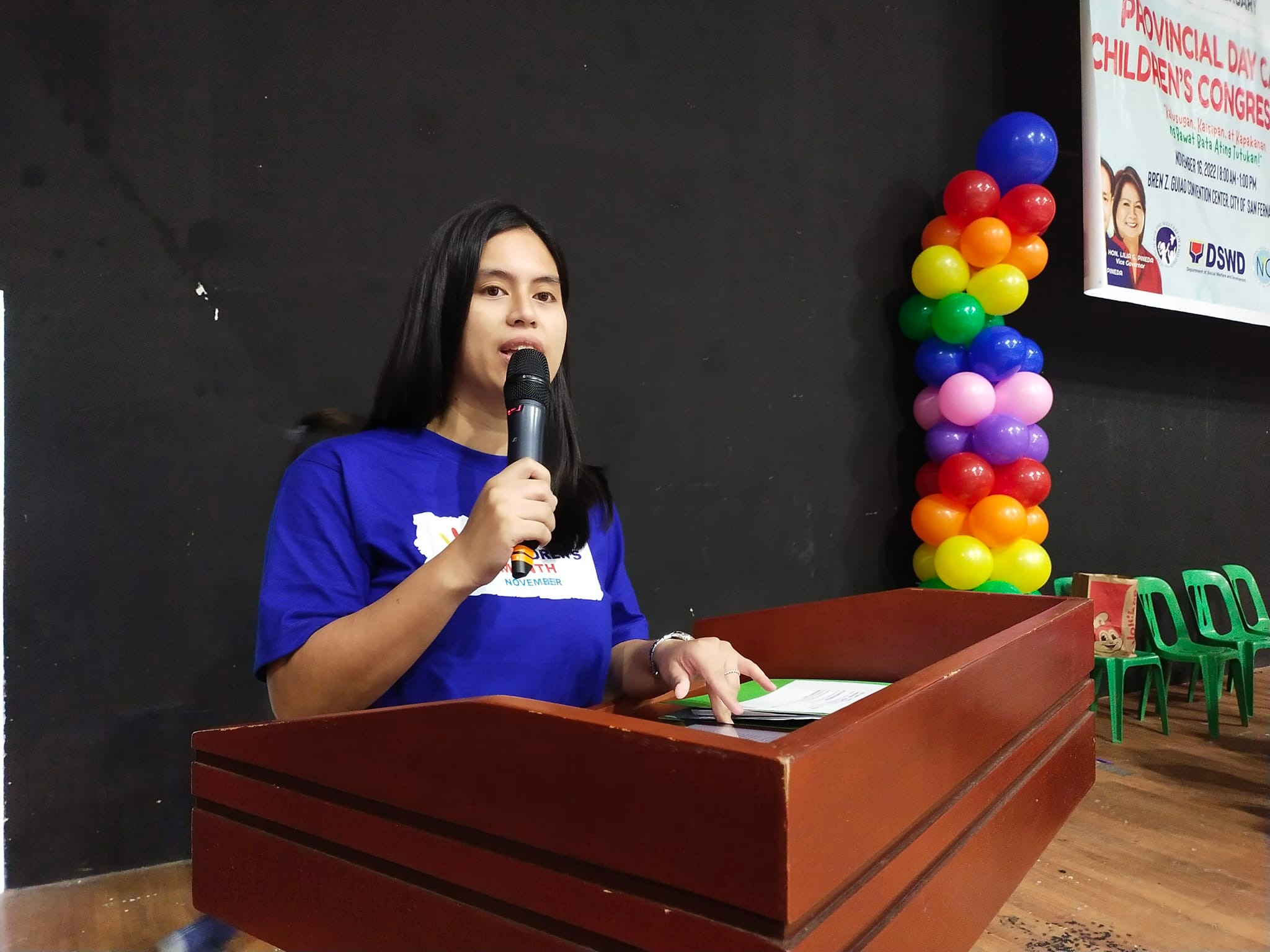
Gonzales in 2022

In 2022, she successfully ran for the Pampanga Provincial Board as the top vote-getter for the 3rd District. In 2025, she was elected to the House of Representatives, succeeding her father.

== Political positions ==
Gonzales has expressed support for policy areas focused on education, women's rights, healthcare access, youth development, and infrastructure in Central Luzon.

== Personal life ==
She maintains a relatively low public profile and is active in local civic programs in Pampanga.

== Electoral history ==
Electoral history of Mica Gonzales
Year	Office	Party	Votes received				Result
Year	Office	Party	Total	%	P.	Swing	Result
2022	Board Member (Pampanga–3rd)	KAMBILAN	237,330	30.57%	1st	—N/a	Won
2025	Representative (Pampanga–3rd)	Lakas	213,914	55.07%	1st	—N/a	Won
