= Mother Teresa of Calcutta Medical Center =

Private hospital in Pampanga, Philippines

- Silvermed Corporation/Mount Grace Hospitals, Inc.

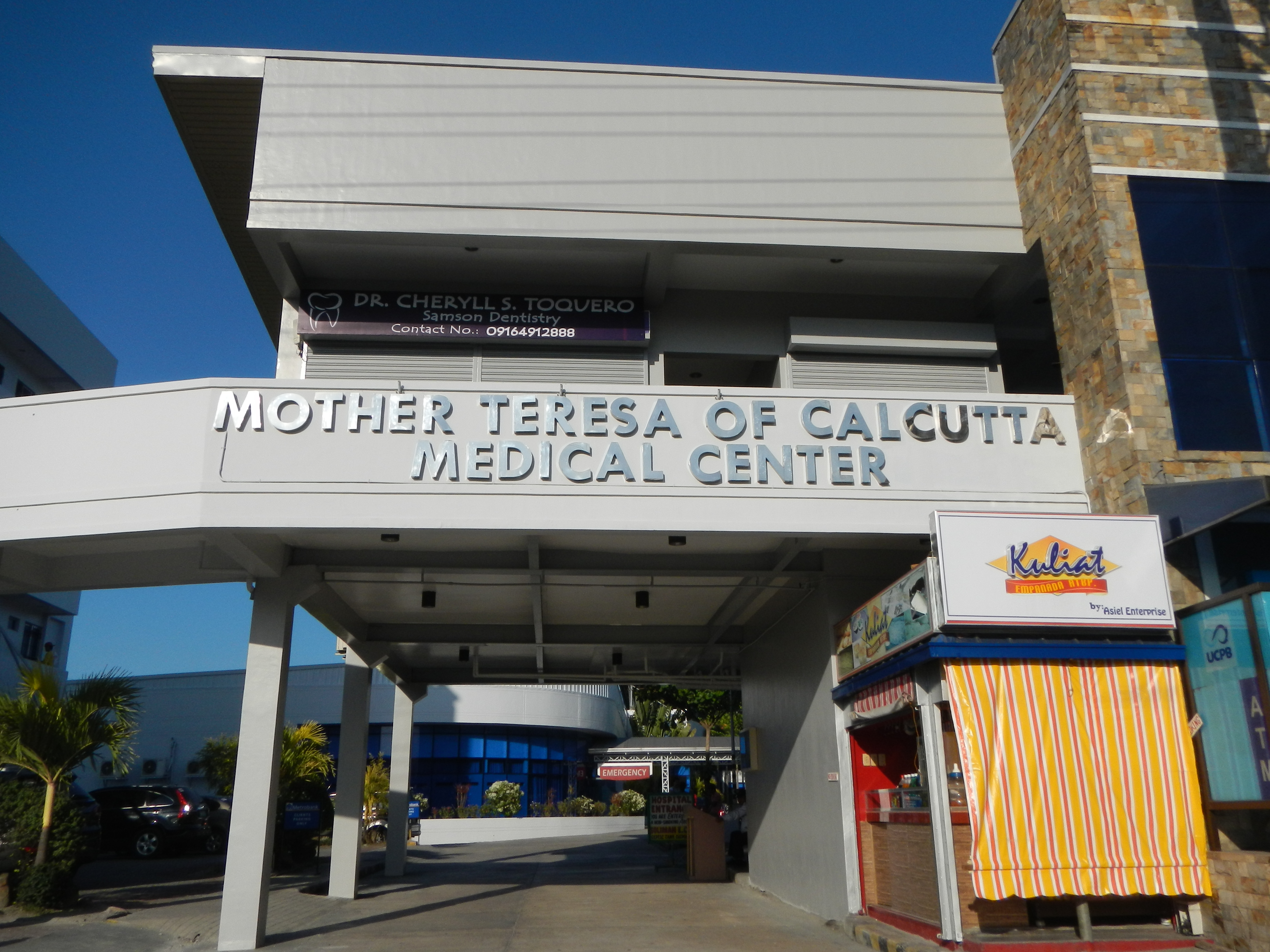

Geography
- Location: MacArthur Hwy., Barangay Maimpis, San Fernando, Pampanga, Philippines
- Coordinates: 15°03′57″N 120°39′14″E

Organization
- Care system: Private
- Type: Tertiary Hospital

Services
- Beds: 210

History
- Opened: February 28, 2006; 19 years ago

Links
- Website: calcuttamed.com.ph www.facebook.com/MTCMedicalCenterOfficial
- Lists: Hospitals in the Philippines

Mother Teresa of Calcutta Medical Center (MTCMC) is a tertiary hospital in San Fernando, Pampanga, Philippines.

== History ==
Founded by Vilma Caluag. Owned and operated by Mount Grace Hospitals, Inc., Mother Teresa of Calcutta Medical Center was founded on February 28, 2006, at MacArthur Highway, Barangay Maimpis, City of San Fernando, Pampanga. It initially started with 100 capacity and today, it already has 142 beds with 415 doctors.

In 2020, MTCMC President Noel Cortez and Medical Director Dr. Noel Evangelista inaugurated the new five-story extension building featuring the Central Luzon Integrated Oncology Centre and the state-of-the-art operating room complex for invasive surgery using Olympus OTV-S200 Visera Elite II device.

In 2023, its CLIOC offered a next-generation tomotherapy platform treatment using the country's first Radixact Machine, developed by Accuray.

== Awards and recognition ==
The City of San Fernando Health Office awarded MTCMC as the healthiest hospital, in large category for three consecutive years. It has been recognized as the Center of Excellence by the Philippine Health Insurance Corporation. In 2012, it was granted certification by ISO 9001:2008, ISO 14001:2004 and OHSAS 18001:2007.

== Services and Departments ==
Center provides the following services:

- The Cancer Unit
- Cardiology Unit
- Dental Unit
- Emergency Unit
- Endoscopy Unit
- Eye Center
- Hemodialysis Unit
- Clinical Laboratory & Pathology
- Operating Room
- Surgery & Anesthesia Care
- Neonatal ICU
- OB-GYNE Complex
- Newborn Service
- Pediatric ICU
- EEG Services
- Pharmacy Unit
- Physical Medicine and Rehabilitation
- Pulmonary Unit
- Radiology Unit
- Nuclear Medicine

== Admissions ==
Patients can be admitted to Mother Teresa of Calcutta Medical Center 24 hours a day, 7 days a week.
