= 2025 San Fernando, Pampanga, local elections =

Philippine elections

- May 12, 2025
- Mayoral election
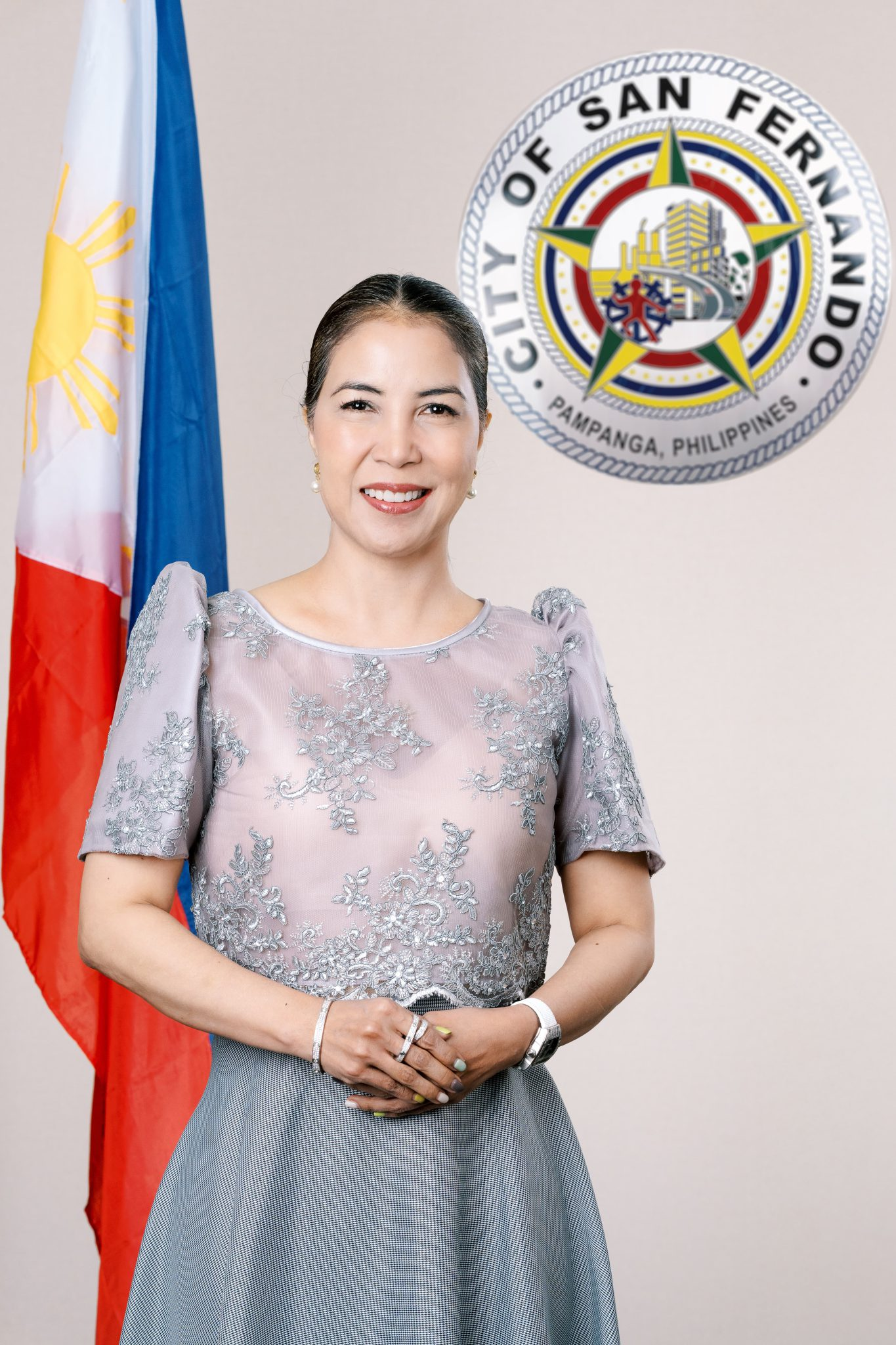

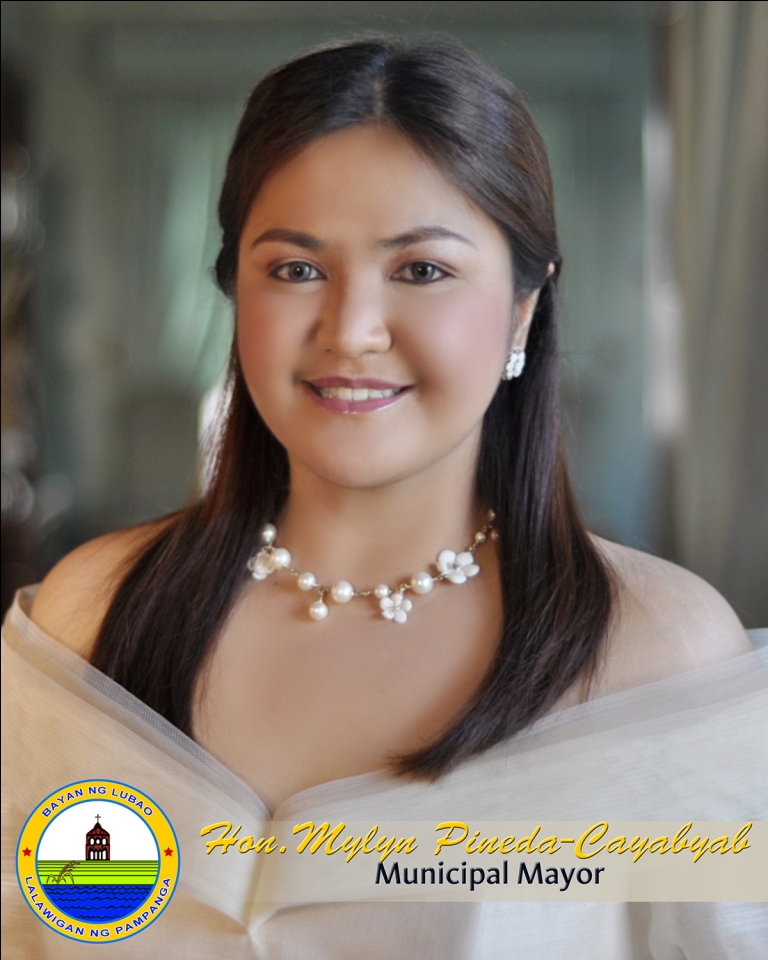
Nominee	Vilma Caluag	Mylyn Pineda-Cayabyab
Party	Independent	Kambilan
Alliance	Team Laban San Fernando	Team My Love San Fernando
Running mate	Brenz Gonzales	BJ Lagman
Popular vote	127,124	49,061
Percentage	76.75%	23.65%
Mayor before election
Vilma Caluag
PDP–Laban
Elected mayor
Vilma Caluag
Independent
- Vice mayoral election
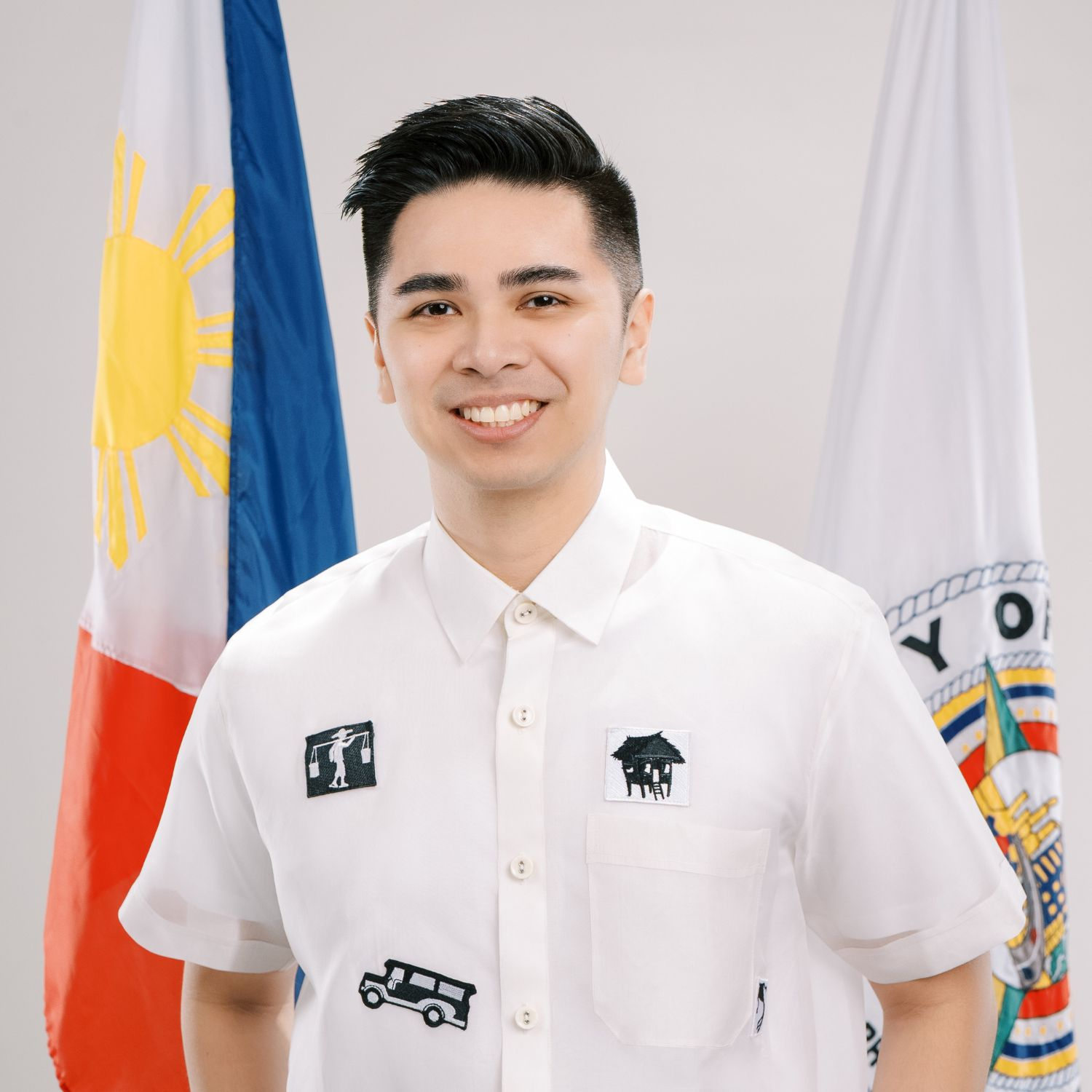

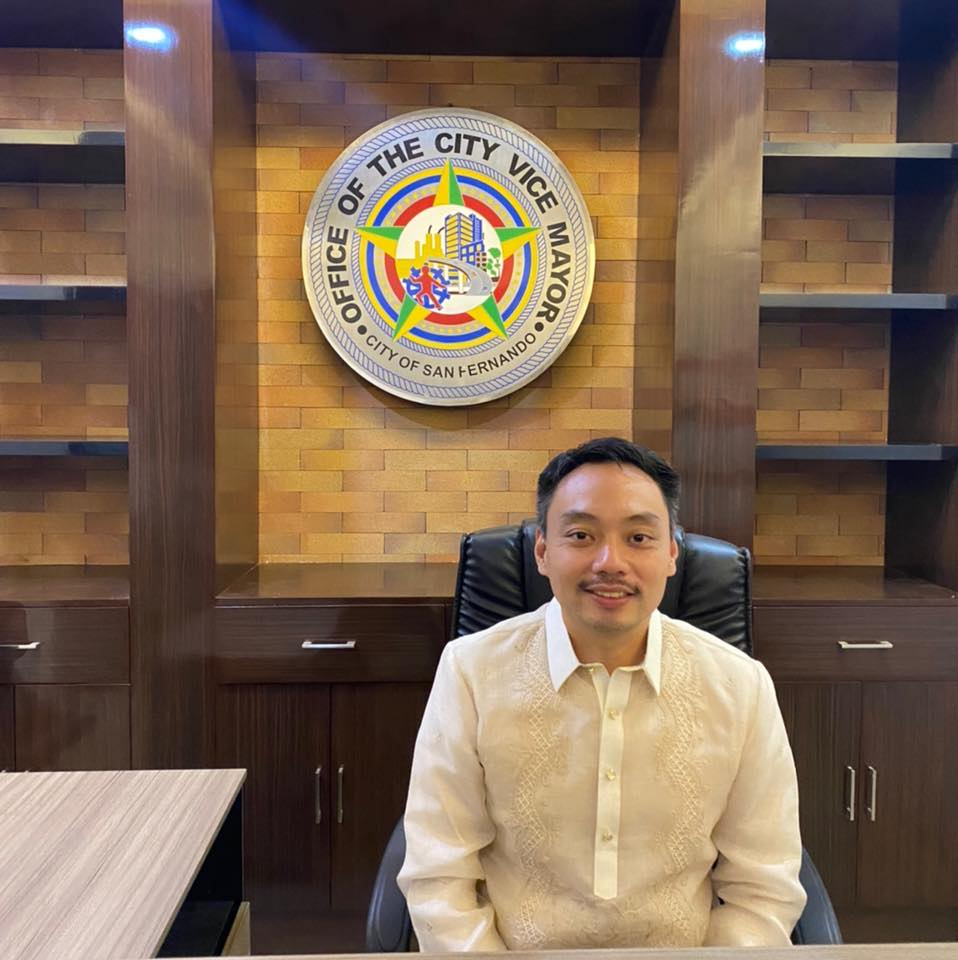
Nominee	Brenz Gonzales	BJ Lagman
Party	PFP	Kambilan
Alliance	Team Laban San Fernando	Team My Love San Fernando
Popular vote	128,191	43,230
Percentage	79.16%	20.84%
Vice Mayor before election
BJ Lagman
Kambilan
Elected Vice Mayor
Brenz Gonzales
PFP

Local elections were held in San Fernando, Pampanga on May 12, 2025, as part of the 2025 Philippine general election. San Fernando, Pampanga voters will elect a mayor, a vice mayor, and 10 out of 12 councilors of the San Fernando City Council.

There are 207,416 eligible voters in the city for this election. Most of them voted for the incumbent.

== Background ==
Vilma Caluag was the incumbent and was running for second term. She was challenged by Mylyn Pineda-Cayabyab of the Kambilan party.

Mayor Caluag was joined by Brenz Gonzales, as her running mate. Mylyn Pineda-Cayabyab chose BJ Tiger Lagman as her running mate.

=== Candidates ===
==== Mayor ====
The following candidates are included in the ballot:

No.	Candidate	Party
1	Vilma Caluag (incumbent)	Independent
2	Mylyn Pineda-Cayabyab	Kambilan

==== Vice Mayor ====
The following candidates are included in the ballot:

No.	Candidate	Party
1	Brenz Gonzales	PFP
2	BJ Tiger Lagman (incumbent)	Kambilan

== Results ==
The candidates for mayor and vice mayor with the highest number of votes win their respective seats. They are elected separately; therefore, they may be of different parties when elected.

=== Mayoral Election ===
Parties are as stated in their certificate of candidacies.

2025 San Fernando, Pampanga mayoral election
Candidate	Party	Votes	%
Vilma Caluag	Independent	127,124	72.15
Mylyn Pineda-Cayabyab	Kambilan	49,061	27.85
Total		176,185	100.00
Independent hold			

=== Vice Mayoral Election ===
Parties are as stated in their certificate of candidacies.

2025 San Fernando, Pampanga vice mayoral election
Candidate	Party	Votes	%
Brenz Gonzales	Partido Federal ng Pilipinas	128,191	74.78
BJ Tiger Lagman	Kambilan	43,230	25.22
Total		171,421	100.00
Partido Federal ng Pilipinas gain from Kambilan			

=== City Council Election ===
Voting is via plurality-at-large voting: Voters will vote for ten (10) candidates and the ten candidates with the highest number of votes are elected.

Of the incumbent councilors elected in 2022, six are not seeking re-election for various reasons:

- Brenz Gonzales, who is running for vice mayor under the Partido Federal ng Pilipinas
- Ato Agustin, who is graduating;
- Redentor Halili, who is graduating;

=== Candidates ===
==== Team Laban San Fernando ====
Team Laban San Fernando
Name	Party
Elmer Bengco	Independent
Mark Joseph Carreon	Independent
Jay Cuyugan	Independent
Reggie David	Independent
Tino Dizon	Independent
Angelo Hizon Jr.	Independent
Kay Pineda	Independent
Jayson Sicat	Independent
Harvey Quiwa	Independent
Noel Tulabut	Independent

==== Team My Love San Fernando ====
Team My Love San Fernando
Name	Party
Kristel Agustin	Kambilan
Benjie Angeles	Kambilan
Rose Calimlim	Kambilan
Tin Kings Chua	Kambilan
Ricky Hizon	Kambilan
Tina David Lagman	Kambilan
Ayzel Macalino	Kambilan
Rosalie Mendoza	Kambilan
Perico Quiwa	Kambilan
Angel Wijangco	Kambilan

==== Independent candidates not in tickets ====
Independent
Name	Party
Edsel Miranda	Independent

=== Results ===
City of San Fernando Council Election
Party	Candidate	Votes	%
Independent	Noel Tulabut	104,736	50.50
Independent	Reggie "G4" David	100,040	48.23
Independent	Harvey Quiwa	95,841	46.21
Independent	Tino Dizon	92,987	44.83
Independent	Racquel "Ate Kay" Pineda	92,002	43.66
Independent	Angelo Hizon Jr.	90,559	43.66
Independent	Jay Cuyugan	86,840	41.87
Independent	Mark Joseph Carreon	83,941	40.47
Independent	Jayson Sicat	60,618	29.23
Independent	Elmer Bengco	59,106	28.50
Kambilan	Kristel Agustin	54,625	26.34
Kambilan	Tin Kings Chua	51,921	25.03
Kambilan	Doc Ayzel Macalino	46,194	22.27
Kambilan	Perico Quiwa	46,108	22.23
Kambilan	Angel "Puti" Wijangco	42,992	20.73
Kambilan	Tina David Lagman	37,696	18.17
Kambilan	Doc Benjie Angeles	29,843	14.39
Kambilan	Ricky Hizon	28,617	13.80
Kambilan	NanayKap Rose Calimlim	28,378	13.68
Kambilan	Rosalie Mendoza	21,010	10.13
Independent	Edsel Miranda	16,449	7.93
Total votes			
