= University of the Assumption =

Roman Catholic university in Pampanga, Philippines

- Pamantasang Assumption (Filipino)
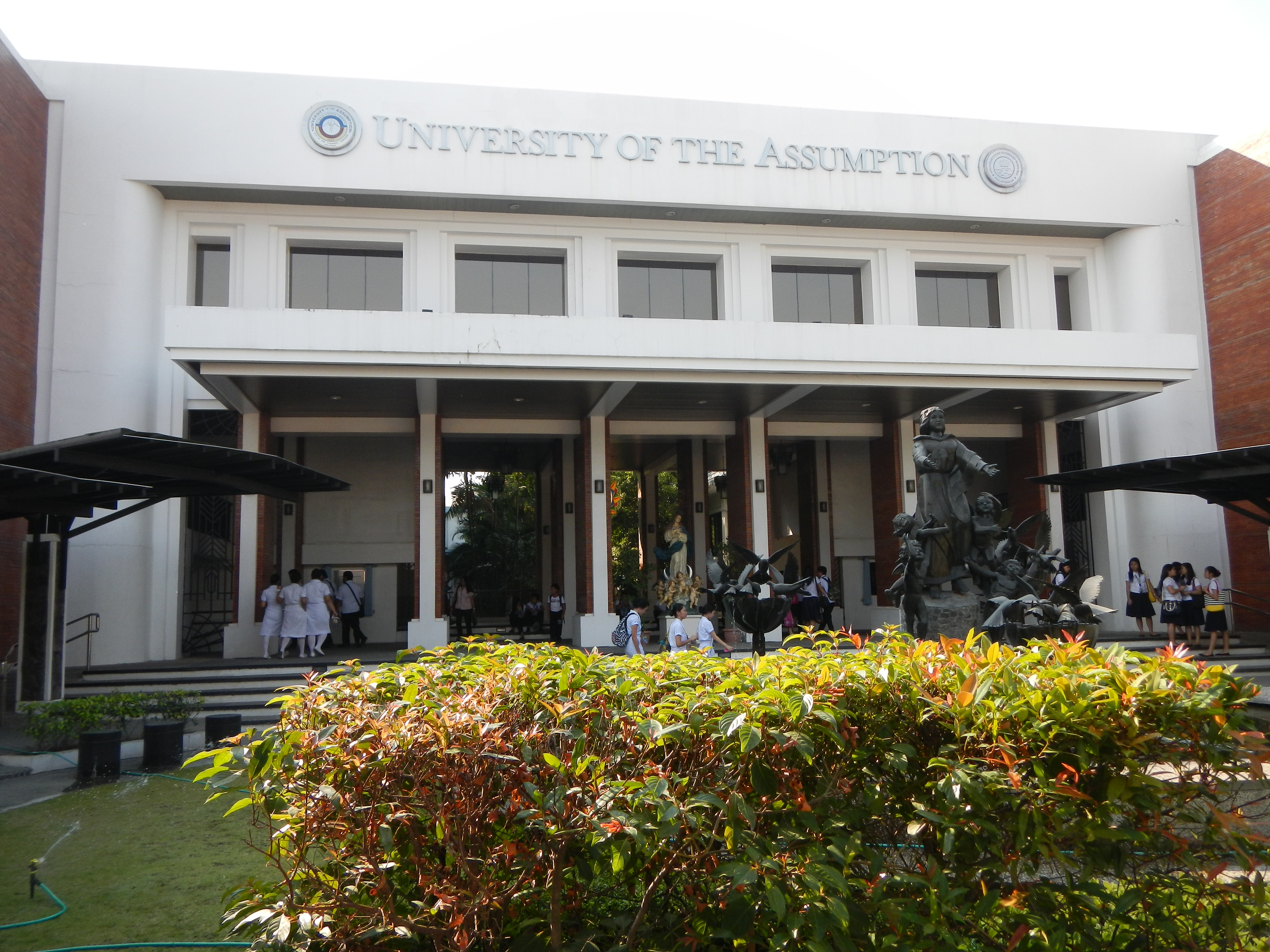
- Facade
- Former names: Assumption Junior College (1963–1965); Assumption College of Pampanga (1965–1980)
- Motto: Scientia, Virtus et Communitas (Latin)
- Motto in English: Knowledge, Virtue, Community Service
- Type: Private Catholic Research Coeducational Basic and Higher education institution
- Established: January 12, 1963; 63 years ago
- Founders: Bishop Emilio A. Cinense, D.D. Msgr. Pedro Puno
- Religious affiliation: Roman Catholic (Dominican Sisters)
- Academic affiliations: PAASCU
- Chairman: Most Rev. Florentino G. Lavarias, DD
- President: Rev. Fr. Oliver G. Yalung, DL, Ph.D.
- Vice-president: Dr. Arnel T. Sicat, Ph.D. (VP for Academic Affairs); Rev. Fr. Victor Nicomedes S. Nicdao S.Th.D, Ph.D. (VP for Administration); Khriselle Anne C. Pangilinan, CPA (VP for Finance)
- Principal: Ma. Jennifer D. Gonzales, MAED-EM (Principal for Grade School) Edita Q. Sagmit, MAT (Principal for Junior High School) Chrysanta S. Rodriguez, MBM, LPT (Principal for Senior High School)
- Location: Unisite Subdivision, Brgy Del Pilar, San Fernando, Pampanga, Philippines; 15°02′13″N 120°41′50″E
- Campus: Suburban
- Alma Mater song: The Assumption Hymn;
- Newspaper: Regina
- Colors: Royal Blue and White
- Nicknames: Assumptionist, Assumptionista
- Mascot: Blue Pelicans
- Website: www.ua.edu.ph

- Location in Luzon Location in the Philippines

The University of the Assumption (U.A.) is a private archdiocesan Catholic university in the City of San Fernando, Pampanga, Philippines. The University of the Assumption is the first Catholic archdiocesan university in the Philippines and in Asia. It is among the top schools in the region, based on its accredited programs, and licensure and professional examination results.

== History ==
U.A. was founded on January 12, 1963, when the bishop of San Fernando, Most Reverend Emilio A. Cinense, D.D., assisted by Msgr. Pedro D. Puno, the Vicar General, concretized his dream of providing Christian education to the poor young men and women of Pampanga.

=== Beginnings ===
The university was originally called Assumption Junior College and was on the third floor of the Assumpta Building in downtown San Fernando. The school was under the watchful eyes of Sr. Gunfrida Schneyer, O.S.B., who was at the time the Superior of the Community of Missionary Benedictine Sisters of Tutzing (Germany).

The college began with an enrollment of 275 students. The degrees offered were Bachelor of Arts, Bachelor of Science in Commerce, Bachelor of Science in Education, and Bachelor of Science in Elementary Education.

In 1965 the campus was transferred to its present site at the Unisite Subdivision, in Barangay Del Pilar. The Puno Building was then the only edifice on the campus. In the same year, the institution was granted government recognition as "Assumption College of Pampanga".

In 1966, Rev. Fr. Aniceto M. Franco became the dean and rector Sr. Mary Philip Ryan, O.P. and the Dominican Sisters of Our Lady of Remedies assisted in the supervision of the grade school and high school. Sr. Mary Philip Ryan was also the superior of the Dominican community whose members performed active roles in the institution's affairs as faculty members and administrators.

In 1969, the Bachelor of Science in Civil Engineering was added to the roster of degrees offered. To accommodate the increase in number of enrollees, the Ryan Building and Benedictine Building were constructed. During the term of Fr. Franco the Archbishop Emilio Cinense Gymnasium was built.

In 1974, Rev. Fr. Octavio M. Ramos was appointed as the first president of the institution. Fr. Ramos worked for the government recognition of new degrees: Bachelor of Science in Nursing, Bachelor of Science in Nutrition and Dietetics, Bachelor of Science in Industrial Engineering, and Bachelor of Science in Architecture. The Graduate School was organized with Master in Business Administration as its first program.

=== From college to university ===
The college was granted University status on March 29, 1980, by the Ministry of Education, Culture and Sports and was named University of the Assumption.

Consequently, enrollment soared and the following buildings were built to accommodate the growing number of students:

- The Nutrition building
- The Grade School building, named after Rev. Msgr. Octavio M. Ramos
- The Msgr. Guerrero building which houses the University Chapel and the Archbishop Oscar V. Cruz Museum and Archives
- The Multi-Purpose Hall
- The Ryan Hall extension
- The Puno Hall extension
- The Alumni building
- The Post Office
- The Waiting Shed

Under Fr. Ramos, the university was chosen as a site for the Regional Staff Development Center, the Nutrition Center, the Decentralized Learning Resource Center, and the Educational Development Implementation Task Force for Region III. Under his term the Outreach Ministry was launched.

=== Further expansion ===
In 1986, Rev. Fr. Cenovio M. Lumanog, Ph.D. was appointed president of the university. On June 13, 1988 the Department of Education, Culture and Sports granted U.A. the recognition to offer a Doctorate degree in Education.

In 1990, the Most Rev. Jesus C. Galang, D.D., then the Auxiliary Bishop of San Fernando, was installed as the president. During his incumbency, the Archbishop V. Cruz building and the Library building (now Most Rev. Jesus C. Galang Building) were constructed. During his term the Bachelor of Science in Accountancy was added to the courses offerings.

=== Modernization ===
Rev. Msgr. Ricardo Jesus T. Serrano, S.L.D. assumed the role as university president in 1992. The following programs were added to the curriculum under his leadership: Master's degree in Public Administration; Bachelor of Science in Hotel and Restaurant Management; Bachelor of Science in Commerce with a major in computer science; and a Master of Education with majors in Early Childhood, Mathematics, Filipino and English.

In 1998, Mass Communication and Interior Design were added as among the majors in Liberal Arts. In the same year, the Commission on Higher Education (CHED) granted the university the permission to convert AB major in Social Work to Bachelor of Science in Social Work. Msgr. Serrano was responsible in implementing anti-lahar and anti-flood interventions. The Grade School building and the Archbishop Cinense Gymnasium underwent major renovations. It was expanded to include three wings: the Msgr. Lumanog Building, the Msgr. Ramos Building, and the Franco Building. To meet the needs of the growing student populace, rooms at the Archdiocese of San Fernando building (ASF) and the Diocese of San Fernando building (DSF) were occupied to house the computer laboratories, and modern typing, and lecture rooms. Modernization of the campus included two additional audio-visual rooms, an Internet Center, computer rooms, and multimedia classrooms.

A tennis court with a mini club house were added to enhance the sports and athletic facilities on campus. The newest buildings on campus are the Hotel and Restaurant Management building, presently known as the Domus Mariae International Center (the UA Hotel); and the new High School Building (Phases 1 and 2). Other enhancements include the UA Facade; the UA Radio Studio; the UA TV Studio, the Speech Laboratory and the Archbishop Aniceto Student Center Building.

In 2007, His Excellency Most Reverend Roberto C. Mallari, D.D., Auxiliary Bishop of San Fernando, Pampanga, was installed as the fifth president. He is ably assisted by Rev. Fr. Winifredo Santos who was later replaced by Dr. Mediatriz D. Martin for Academic Affairs, Rev. Fr. Manuel Sta. Maria for Administration, and Rev. Fr. Deogracias Kerr S. Galang for Finance.

After serving the university for almost five years, Bishop Roberto Mallari, D.D. was appointed by Pope Benedict XVI to head the Diocese of San Jose in Nueva Ecija. Thus, on August 22, 2012, Rev. Fr. Joselito C. Henson, S.Th.D. was installed as the sixth president of the university. On May 28, 2013, Rev. Fr. Victor S. Nicdao and Mrs. Belina Katigbak were installed as VP for Administration and VP for Finance, respectively. They took over from Rev. Fr. Manuel C. Sta. Maria and Rev. Fr. Deogracias Kerr S. Galang.

On July 31, 2024, Rev. Fr. Oliver G. Yalung, DL, Ph.D. was installed as the seventh president of the university. Mr. Arnel T. Sicat, Ph.D. was also installed as the new VP for Academic Affairs.

=== Recently ===
At present, the university is offering new programs, namely, Bachelor of Science in Tourism Management, Bachelor of Science in Information Technology and Bachelor of Science in Electronics and Communications Engineering.

Aside from the new course offerings, the new administration has concluded its first Collective Bargaining Agreement with the union without hassles. Salaries of employees were adjusted to a level most acceptable to all parties.

With the convenience of the students as the main driving force, the Execom under the leadership of Bishop Bobet initiated the construction of the St. Thomas Aquinas Students Courtyard (STACY) which serves as the student center and the remodeling of the main entrance which is now called as the "Gates of Excellence".

=== Golden Jubilee ===
The university celebrated its 50th founding anniversary on January 13, 2013. In unity with the victims of the recent calamity, the administration decided to have a simple celebration starting with the launching of the year-long celebration on September 7, 2012. The highlight of the celebration was in January 2013 during the foundation week.

== Accreditation ==
In the new millennia, the University of the Assumption became a member of the Philippine Association of Accredited Schools, Colleges and Universities (PAASCU). In 2002, the Liberal Arts, Education, Commerce, Accountancy and Nursing programs, as well as the Grade School and High School curricula, were granted Level 2 Accreditation.

The Graduate School was ranked among the top graduate education centers in the region based on the results of the Evaluation of Graduate Education in the Philippines (EGEP) jointly conducted by the Commission on Higher Education (CHED) and the Fund for Assistance to Private Education (FAPE) from July 2003 to September 2004.

In August 2005, the Commission on Higher Education (CHED) approved the university's application to offer Bachelor of Science in Biology (Pre-Med), and Bachelor of Science in Mathematics effective school year 2006-2007.

In May 2008, the School of Arts and Sciences, College of Education, College of Business Administration, and Nursing programs achieved PAASCU level 2 re-accreditation.

On May 10, 2013, PAAASCU granted re-accreditation for five years to Arts and Sciences, Elementary Education and Business Administration Programs.

Immediately upon Roberto C. Mallari assumption of office, the University was granted a Level II re-accreditation status by PAASCU.

Best school in Central Luzon.

== Academics ==
The University of the Assumption has five academic colleges:

=== School of Technological Studies ===
The School of Technological Studies has the second largest undergraduate enrollment at the university. It offers bachelor's degrees in Architecture, Interior Design, Civil Engineering, Industrial Engineering, Computer Engineering, Mathematics, and Computer Science, Information Technology, Electronics Communication Engineering.

- Architecture & Interior Design - The College of Architecture at the University of the Assumption is the first college in the province of Pampanga to offer a bachelor's degree in Architecture. In 1979, Assumption College of Pampanga conceived the idea of creating its own College of Architecture as a prerequisite for attaining its university status. In June of the same year, the first College of Architecture in the region was born. Three young architects were commissioned to become the first faculty: Efren Mendoza, Rodolfo Alviz and Danilo Galura. Danilo Galura became the first dean of the college. Two sections of seventy-two freshmen became the pioneering batch. Steadily, the population of the college grew, not only in students, but also in faculty.

=== School of Business ===
The School of Business was formerly known as the College of Commerce. It provided one of the original degrees offered: the Bachelor of Science in Commerce. It has the largest undergraduate enrollment in the university. The School of business offers both undergraduate and graduate programs.

=== School of Arts and Sciences ===
The School of Arts and Sciences offers two undergraduate programs: Bachelor of Science in Psychology and Bachelor of Arts in Communication.

=== College of Professional Teacher Education ===
The College of Professional Teacher Education is one of the oldest colleges at the university offering a Bachelor of Science in elementary education or secondary education. It offers a Master of Arts in Education and is the only college to offer a doctoral degree.

=== College of Nursing ===
The University of the Assumption is one of three universities in the province that offers a bachelor's degree in Nursing (BSN). The program was opened in 1974 during the administration of Rev. Fr. Octavio M. Ramos. Clinical affiliations and internships are conducted at the Jose B. Lingad Regional Hospital and at hospitals throughout Metro Manila, including the University of Santo Tomas Hospital, the oldest university in the Philippines. Community outreach programs in the local barrios of are a regular part of the clinical experience and a major emphasis of the program.

== Degrees and programs offered ==
=== Undergrad programs ===
==== College of Accountancy ====
- Bachelor of Science in Accountancy
- Bachelor of Science in Accounting Information System

==== School of Business and Public Administration ====
- Bachelor of Science in Business Administration Major in:
  - Marketing Management
  - Operations Management
- Masters in Business Administration
  - With Thesis
  - Non Thesis
- Masters in Public Administration
- With Thesis
  - Non Thesis

==== College of Hospitality and Tourism Management ====
- Bachelor of Science in Hospitality Management
- Bachelor of Science in Tourism Management

==== School of Education ====
- Bachelor of Elementary Education with areas of specialization in:
  - Pre-School Education
  - General Education
- Bachelor of Secondary Education with areas of specialization in:
  - Religious Education and Values Education
  - English
  - Filipino
  - Social Studies
  - Mathematics
  - Physical Sciences
  - Music, Arts, Physical Education, Health (MAPEH)
  - Certificate in Teaching (for Degree Holders)
- Master of Arts in Education (M.A.Ed.) with areas of specializations in:
  - Education Management
  - English
  - Physical Education
  - Teaching Filipino
  - Mathematics

==== College of Engineering and Architecture ====
- Bachelor of Science in Architecture
- Bachelor of Science in Civil Engineering
- Bachelor of Science in Industrial Engineering
- Bachelor of Science in Electronics and Communications Engineering
- Bachelor of Science in Computer Engineering

==== College of Computing Sciences and Information Technology ====
- Bachelor of Science in Information Technology
- Bachelor of Library and Information Science

==== School of Arts and Sciences ====
- Bachelor of Arts in Communication
- Bachelor of Science in Psychology

Bachelor of Human Services

- Masters in Guidance & Counselling

==== College of Nursing and Pharmacy ====
- Bachelor of Science in Nursing
- Bachelor of Science in Pharmacy

==== Institute of Theology and Religious Studies ====
- Master of Arts in Theological Studies

==== Post-grad programs ====
- Doctor of Philosophy with major in
  - Educational Management

=== Basic education ===
- Senior High School
  - Science, Technology, Engineering, and Mathematics (STEM)

- Pre-Medical Allied Courses - Engineering, Architecture, and related courses - Computer Engineering, Computer Science, and IT Programs

  - Business and Entrepreneurship (BE)

- Accountancy - Financial Management - Tourism and Hospitality Management - Entrepreneurship - Business Related Programs

  - Arts, Humanities, and Social Sciences (ASSH)

- Education - Political Science - Arts and Humanities - Social Sciences Programs

- Junior High School
- Grade School

=== Pre-elementary ===
- Senior Kindergarten
- Junior Kindergarten
- Nursery

== Student organizations ==
- REGINA: The Official Student Publication of the University of the Assumption
- University of the Assumption Central Student Council (UACSC)
- The Magnificat : The Official Student Publication of the UA Senior High School
- UA Senior High School Supreme Student Council (UASHSSSC)

Recognized student organizations:

- Architecture Association of the Assumption (AAA)
- Business Administration College Council (BACC)
- Citizen's Drug Watch (CDW)
- Computer Science Council (CSC)
- College Red Cross Youth Council (CRCYC)
- Council of Hotel and Restaurant Management Students (CHARMS)
- English Society (ENGSOC)
- Institute of Computer Engineers of the Philippines (ICPEP)
- Institute of Financial and Management Accountants (IFMA)
- Junior Philippine Institute of Accountants (JPIA)
- League of Educators Advocating for Development (LEAD)
- League of the Tourism Students of the Philippines (LTSP)
- Mass Communications Students Association (MCSA)
- Mathematics Society (MATHSOC)
- Nursing Student Council (NSC)
- National Service Training Program (NSTP)
- Philippine Institute of Civil Engineers (PICE)
- Philippine Institute of Industrial Engineers (PIIE)
- Psychology Society (PSYCHSOC)
- School of Technological Studies Mother Council (STSMC)
- Society of Arts and Sciences Students (SOARS)
- UA Student Assistance Organization (UASAO)
- UA Student Grantees Association (UASGA) which includes:

- a. UA Band
- b. UA Chorale
- c. UA Dance Troupe
- d. UA Varsity

Religious organizations under the supervision of the director of Campus and Outreach Ministry

- Apostolate for the Aged (Bahay Pag-ibig)
- Catechetical Ministry
- CFC Youth for Christ (YFC)
- Commentators-Lectors Guild (COMLEC)
- Christ's Youth in Action (CYA)
- Hospital Ministry
- Knights of the Blessed Sacrament
- Prison Apostolate
- Street Children
- Youth Community Service Club

== Affiliations ==
The University of the Assumption is affiliated with the following accredited national professional organizations:

=== Institutional membership ===
- ACUP - Association of Catholic Universities of the Philippines
- ASEEACCU - Association of Southeast and East Asian Catholic Colleges and Universities
- APCAS - Association of Philippine Colleges of Arts and Sciences
- ASPAP - Association of School of Public Administration in the Philippines, Inc.
- CEAP - Catholic Educational Association of the Philippines
- CEM - Center for Educational Measurement
- COCOPEA - Coordinating Council of Private Educational Associations
- CODHASP - Council of Deans and Heads of Architectural Schools of the Philippines
- GCP - Guidance Circle of the Philippines
- HRAP - Hotel & Restaurant Association of the Philippines
- PAARL - Philippine Association of Academic and Research Librarians
- PAASCU - Philippine Accrediting Association of Schools, Colleges, and Universities
- PACSB - Philippine Association of Colleges and Schools of Business
- PACU - Philippine Association of Colleges and Universities
- PAFTE - Philippine Association of Teacher Education
- PAGE - Philippine Association of Graduate Education
- PLMP - Philippine Library Materials Project Foundation
- PMAP - Personnel Management Association of the Philippines
- PSERE - Philippine Society of Educational Research and Evaluation
- PSITE - Philippine Society of Information Technology
- REDTI - Research and Educational Development Technological Institute

=== Departmental membership ===
Architecture

- UAP - United Architects of the Philippines
- CIDE - Council of Interior Design Educators

Nursing

- PRC - Philippine Red Cross (Pampanga Chapter)

High School

- APSA-CSF - Association of Private Schools Administrators-City of San Fernando (Pampanga)
- PRISAAP - Private Secondary School Administrators Association of the Philippines

=== Individual membership ===
Architecture

- CODHASP - Council of Deans and Heads of Architectural Schools of the Philippines

Nursing

- ADPCN - Association of Deans of Philippine Colleges of Nursing
- ANSAP - Association of Nursing Service Administration of the Philippines
- MCNAP - Maternal and Child Nurses Association of the Philippines
- ORNAP - Operating Room Nurses Association of the Philippines
- PNA - Philippine Nurses Association

Library

- ALA - American Library Association
- CLLA - Central Luzon Library Association
- PLA - Philippine Librarian Association
- PAARL - Philippine Association of Academic and Research Librarians
- PLS - Pampanga Librarians' Society

Guidance

- Philippine Guidance and Counseling Association Inc. (PGCA)
- The Guidance Circle of the Philippines

Education

- CDCE - Council of Deans of the College of Education

Mathematics

- MSP - Mathematical Society of the Philippines
- MATHTED - Philippine Council of Mathematics Teacher Educators
- LSC - Luzon Science Consortium

Engineering

- PICE - Philippine Institute of Civil Engineers
- PIIE - Philippine Institute of Industrial Engineers

Hotel and Restaurant Management

- COHREP - Council of Hotel and Restaurant Educators of the Philippines

Graduate School / Academic Research

- PAGE - Philippine Association of Graduate Education
- PSERE - Philippine Society of Educational Research and Evaluation
- REDTI - Research and Educational Development Technological Institute

Affiliates in the Computer Science Industry and Academe

- CSP - Computing Society of the Philippines
- PCSC - Philippine Computing Science Congress
- PSIA - Philippine Software Industry Association
- PSITE - Philippine Society of Information Technology Educators
- PeLs - Philippine eLearning Society
- SAITE - Student Assembly on Information Technology Education
- SSITE - Student Society in Information Technology Education

Affiliate hospitals

- Balitucan District Hospital
- Camp Olivas Clinic
- Diosdado P. Macapagal Memorial Hospital
- Dr. Emigdio C. Cruz Sr. Memorial Hospital
- Escolastica Rodriguez District Hospital
- Jose B. Lingad Memorial Regional Hospital
- Lung Center of the Philippines
- Mabalacat District Hospital
- Mariveles Mental Ward
- National Center for Mental Health
- Ospital ng Angeles
- Philippine Orthopedic Center
- Ricardo P. Rodrigues Memorial Hospital
- Romana Pangan District Hospital
- Rural Health Unit
- St. Claire Psychiatric Home Care
- San Lazaro Hospital
- San Luis District Hospital
- University of Santo Tomas Hospital

== Notable alumni ==
- Ato Agustin – former basketball player and current assistant coach for San Miguel Beermen
- Rey Aquino – former mayor and former congressman
- Vilma Caluag – current mayor of San Fernando, Pampanga
