= Vilma Caluag =

Mayor of San Fernando, Pampanga since 2022

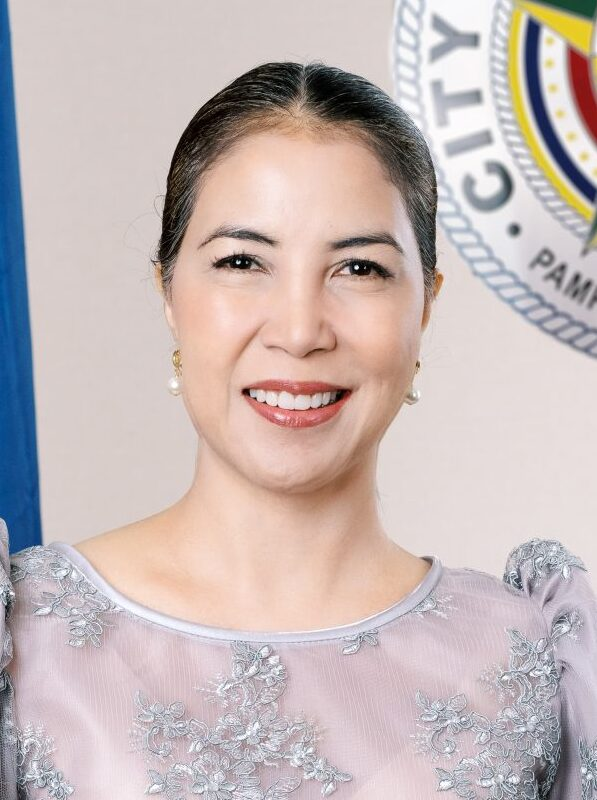
- Official portrait, 2025

33rd Mayor of San Fernando, Pampanga
- Incumbent
- Assumed office June 30, 2022
- Vice Mayor: Benedict Jasper Simon Lagman (2022–2025); Aurelio Brenz P. Gonzales (2025–present)
- Preceded by: Edwin Santiago

Member of the San Fernando City Council
- In office 2016 – 2022 (Note: As President of the Association of Barangay Captains, she automatically served as an ex-officio member of the city council, representing the interests of the barangays in legislation.)
Barangay positions
President of the Association of Barangay Captains of San Fernando
In office
2016–2022
Barangay Captain of Barangay Dolores
In office
November 30, 2010 – June 30, 2022

Personal details
- Born: Vilma Pineda Balle; November 6, 1972 (age 53) San Fernando, Pampanga, Philippines
- Party: Independent (2010–2018; 2024–present)
- Other political affiliations: PDP (2021–2024); Lakas (2018–2021)
- Spouse: Melchor Caluag (m. 1991)
- Children: 7
- Education: University of the Assumption (BA)
- Occupation: Politician, businesswoman

Vilma Balle-Caluag (born Vilma Pineda Balle; November 6, 1972) is a Filipino politician and businesswoman who is currently serving as the 33rd Mayor of San Fernando, Pampanga since 2022. She is the first female mayor of the city having won the 2022 mayoral election. She previously served as an ex officio City Councilor of San Fernando from 2016 to 2022, concurrently holding the position of President of the Association of Barangay Captains. Prior to this, she was the Barangay Captain of Barangay Dolores from 2010 to 2022.

== Early life and education ==
Caluag was born as Vilma Pineda Balle on November 6, 1972, in San Fernando, Pampanga to Meliton Balle and Lolita Pineda. Raised in a modest household, she experienced firsthand the challenges of poverty. Her family operated an ice-selling business, which was profitable during the summer but struggled during the rainy season. Their home in Barangay Dolores frequently flooded, leading to health issues due to prolonged exposure to stagnant water. Despite these hardships, Caluag was determined to pursue her education.

She finished her high school education in Jose Abad Santos High School (now Pampanga High School). She completed her Bachelor of Arts in Literature at the University of the Assumption in San Fernando.

== Political career ==
=== Barangay politics (2010–2018) ===
Vilma Caluag began her public service as Barangay Captain of Barangay Dolores in San Fernando. During this time, she worked on local development and governance at the grassroots level.

In 2016, she was elected President of the Association of Barangay Captains (ABC) of San Fernando. This role gave her an ex-officio seat on the Sangguniang Panlungsod (City Council), allowing her to represent the barangays in city legislation.

=== 2019 San Fernando, Pampanga mayoralty bid ===
Caluag ran for mayor of San Fernando in the 2019 elections but was unsuccessful. Undeterred, she continued to serve her community and prepared for another run.

=== Mayor of San Fernando, Pampanga (2022–present) ===
==== First term ====
In 2022, running under the PDP–Laban party, Caluag won the mayoralty with 57,486 votes, defeating incumbent Pampanga Provincial Board Member Rosve Henson, Vice Mayor Jimmy Lazatin and former Mayor Oscar Rodriguez. She was sworn in as the first female mayor of the city on June 30, 2022.

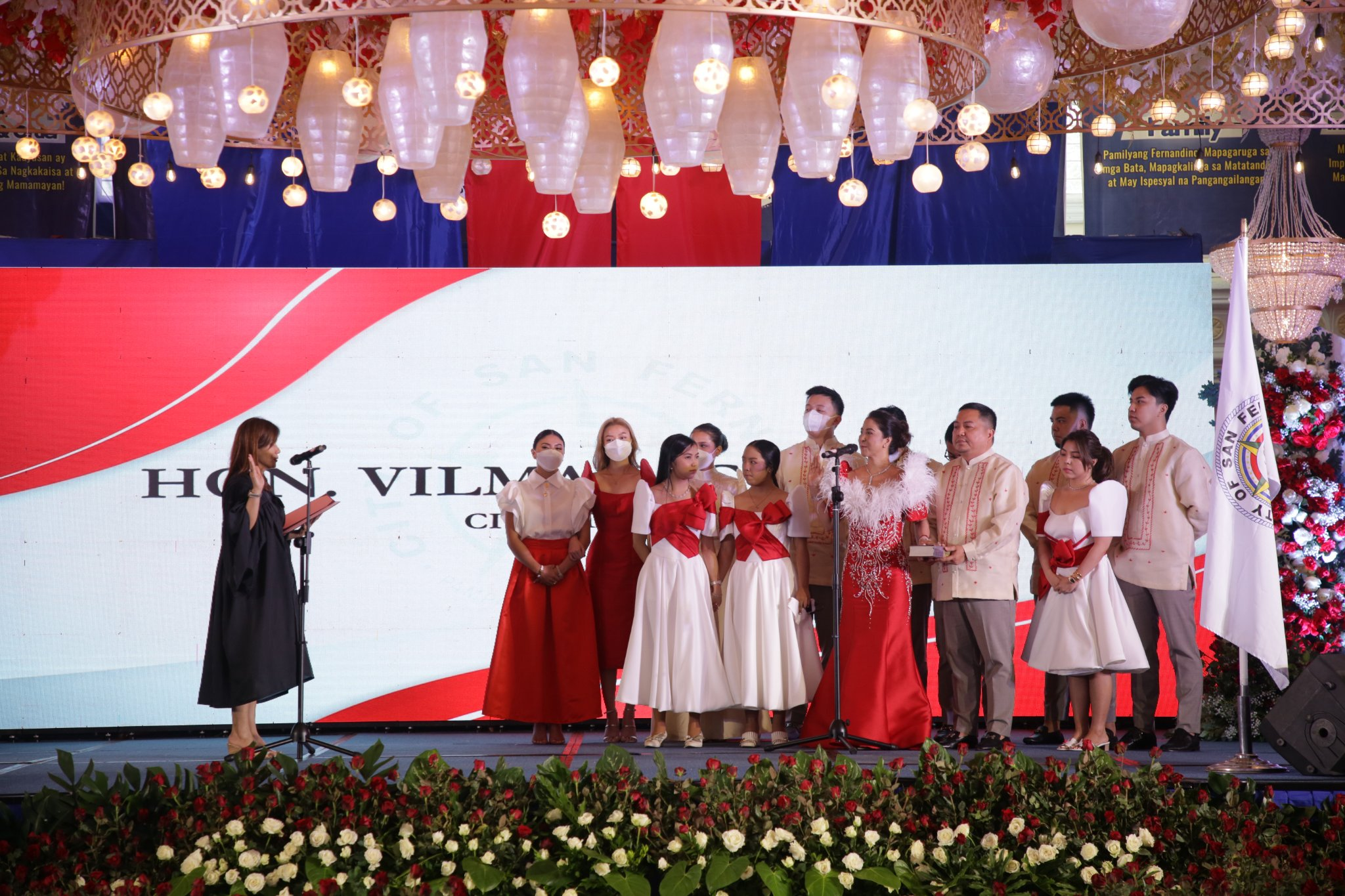
Caluag during oathtaking as first female mayor of San Fernando, Pampanga in 2022

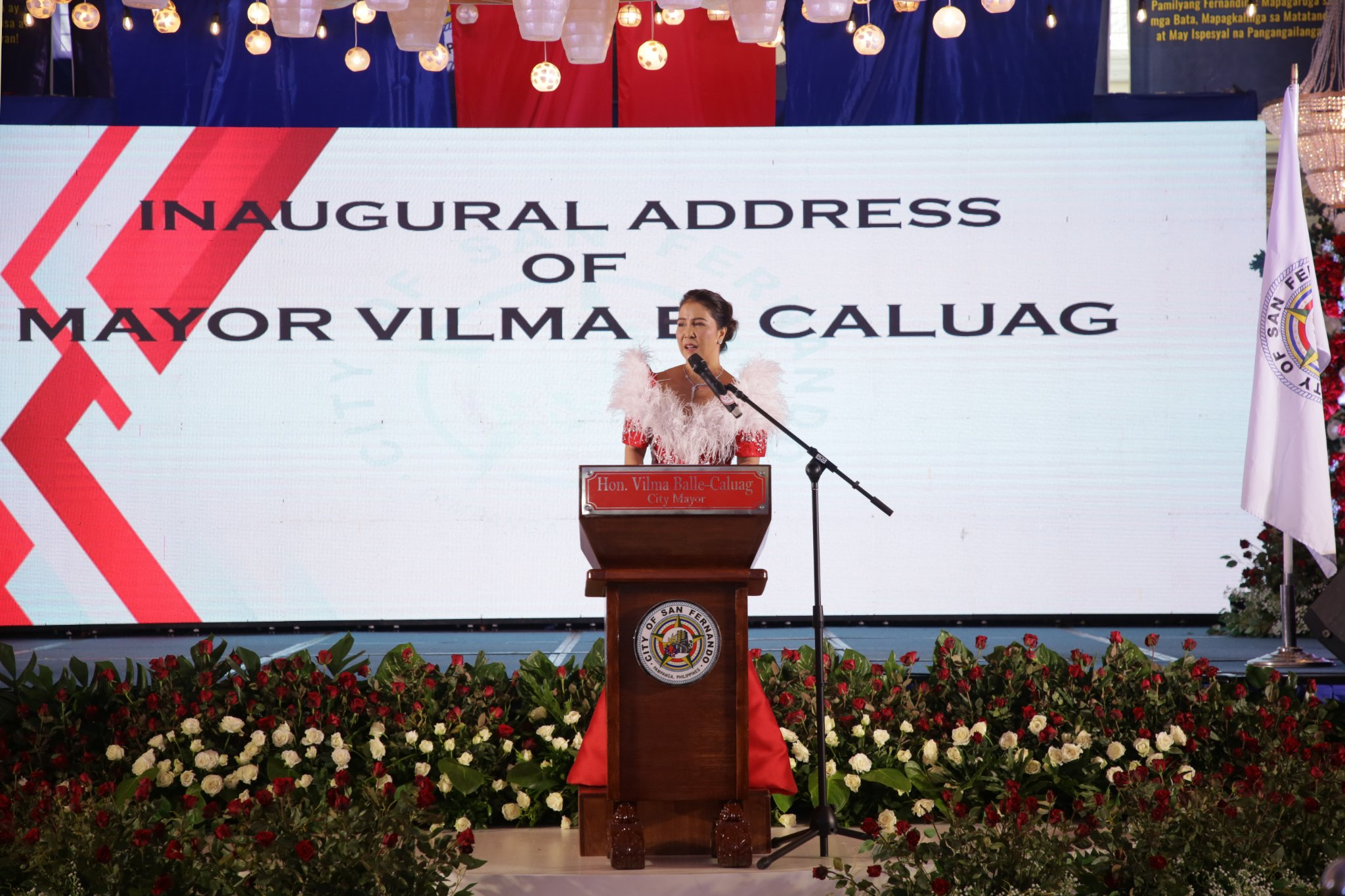
Caluag's inaugural address in 2022

As mayor, Caluag prioritized health and education initiatives, including the establishment of the Fernandino Dialysis Center within her first 100 days in office. She also launched the "Isang Guro, Isang Barangay" project in 2024 to deploy professional teachers across all barangays, providing scholarships including an international partnership with North American University in Texas, USA.

==== Second term ====
In the 2025 elections, Caluag sought a second term as mayor of San Fernando. Running as an independent candidate, she secured a decisive victory, garnering 127,124 votes (76.35%) against her main opponent, Mylyn Pineda-Cayabyab of the Kambilan party, who received 49,061 votes (23.65%). Caluag's entire Laban San Fernando slate also achieved a clean sweep in the city council elections, winning all 10 seats. Her victory was seen as a significant political upset, defeating the Pineda family's Kambilan-backed slate, a dominant force in Pampanga politics.

== Personal life ==
At the age of 19, Caluag married Melchor Caluag, who was 21 at the time. The couple had been childhood sweethearts in Looban, Barangay Dolores. Despite Melchor's speech impediment, Vilma accepted his proposal without hesitation. They have seven children, three of whom are professionals, while another is expected to graduate from college.

In 2002, Caluag faced a personal and public challenge when her husband survived an assassination attempt in San Fernando, Pampanga. The shooting occurred in broad daylight and was witnessed by several individuals, though no one came forward to testify. Despite the incident and the public attention it drew, Caluag continued to manage their family and business affairs. Following the attack, her husband transitioned into legitimate business ventures. Together, they went on to establish several enterprises, which later supported Caluag’s entry into public service.

Outside of politics, Caluag is also known for her entrepreneurial ventures. She and her husband co-founded multiple businesses, including St. Nicholas College in 2003, the Mother Teresa of Calcutta Medical Center in 2005, Kings Royale Hotel, and a poultry farm. These businesses have contributed to local economic development and reflect her commitment to education and healthcare.

Caluag maintains an active presence on social media platforms, often collaborating with her eldest daughter, Nicole Caluag, who is a prominent influencer and entrepreneur. Nicole, who manages the family's real estate business, has a significant following on Instagram and TikTok, where she shares content related to lifestyle, family, and their business ventures. Their online presence has been noted for showcasing the family's activities and contributing to their public image.

== Electoral history ==
Electoral history of Vilma Caluag
Year	Office	Party	Votes received				Result
Year	Office	Party	Total	%	P.	Swing	Result
2019	Mayor of San Fernando, Pampanga	Lakas	52,225	—N/a	2nd	—N/a	Lost
2022	Mayor of San Fernando, Pampanga	PDP–Laban	57,486	—N/a	1st	—N/a	Won
2025	Mayor of San Fernando, Pampanga	Independent	127,124	76.75%	1st	—N/a	Won

== Notes ==
Political offices
Preceded by Edwin Santiago	Mayor of San Fernando, Pampanga; 2022–present	Incumbent
