= Brenz Gonzales =

Filipino civil engineer and politician (born 1996)

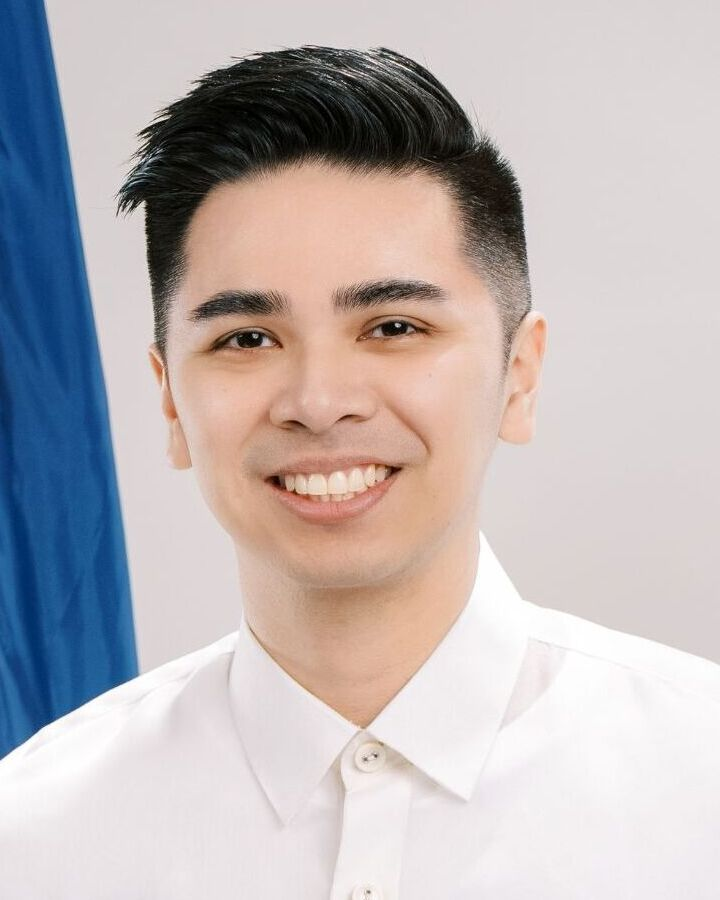
- Official portrait, 2025

Vice Mayor of San Fernando, Pampanga
- Incumbent
- Assumed office June 30, 2025
- Mayor: Vilma Caluag
- Preceded by: Benedict Jasper Lagman

Member of San Fernando City Council
- In office June 30, 2022 – June 30, 2025

Personal details
- Born: Aurelio Brenz Panlilio Gonzales; April 14, 1996 (age 30)
- Party: PFP (2024–present)
- Other political affiliations: KAMBILAN (2021–2024)
- Relations: Mica Gonzales (half-sister)
- Children: 1
- Parent(s): Aurelio Gonzales Jr. (father); Elizabeth Panlilio (mother)
- Education: De La Salle University (BS)
- Occupation: Civil engineer, politician

Aurelio Brenz Panlilio Gonzales (born April 14, 1996) is a Filipino civil engineer and politician who is currently serving as the Vice Mayor of San Fernando, Pampanga since 2025. He served as member of the San Fernando City Council from 2022 to 2025.

== Early life and education ==
Gonzales was born on April 14, 1996. He is the only child of Aurelio Gonzales Jr. and Elizabeth Panlilio, came from a prominent family in Pampanga. His mother died during the 2017 Resorts World Manila attack on June 2, 2017. He studied Ateneo de Manila High School for his high school education. He took up civil engineering De La Salle University where he graduated in 2018. He passed the board examination for Civil Engineering in the same year.

== Political career ==
=== San Fernando City Council (2022–2025) ===
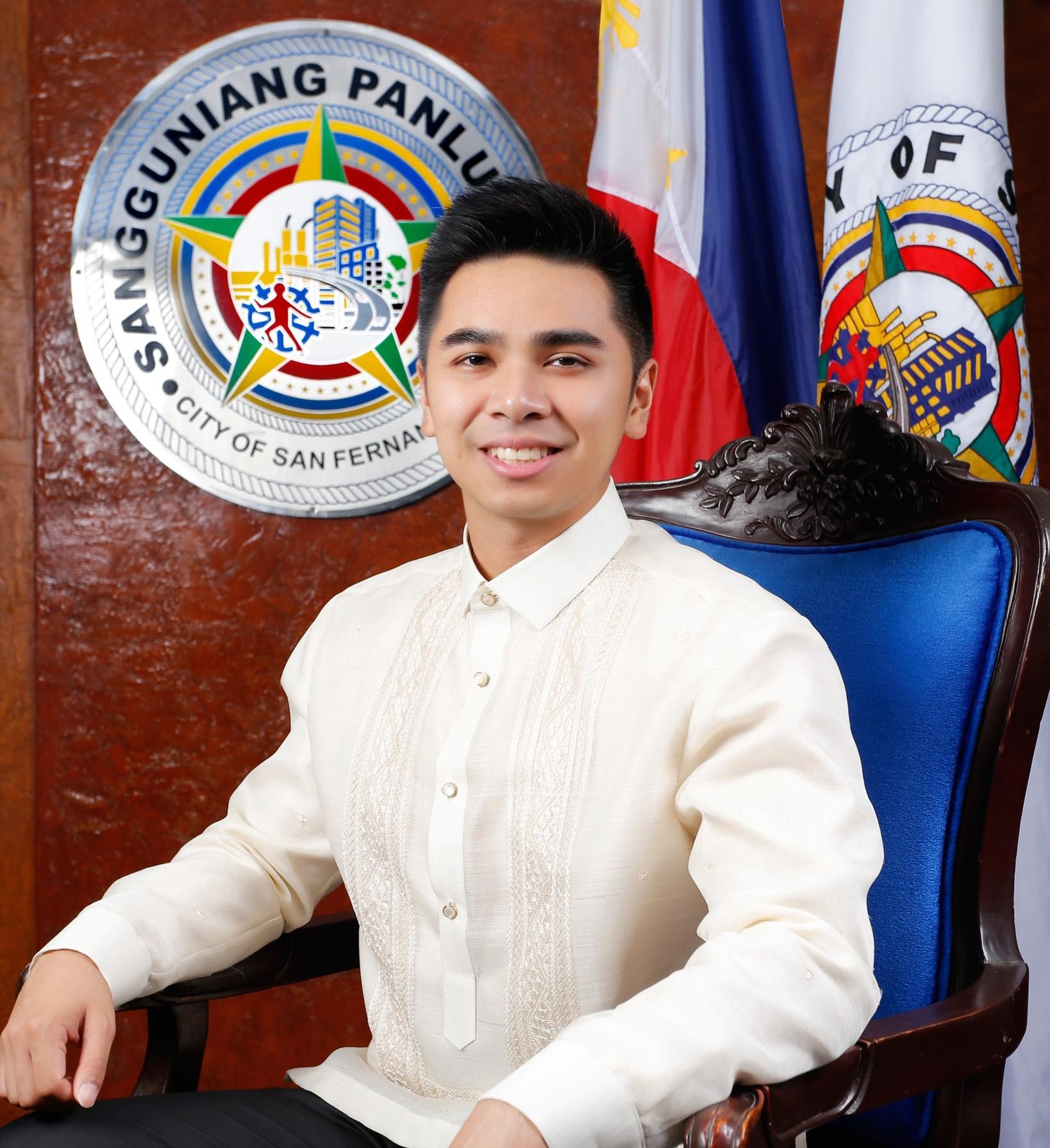
Portrait of Gonzales during his term as councilor of City of San Fernando, Pampanga

Gonzales started his career in politics when he won as member of the San Fernando City Council in 2022.

=== Vice Mayor of San Fernando, Pampanga (2025–present) ===
In the 2025 elections, Gonzales ran as vice mayor of San Fernando, Pampanga with his running mate Vilma Caluag. He won and garnered 128,191 votes against BJ Tiger Lagman in a landslide victory.

== Personal life ==
Gonzales has a daughter who was born on September 12, 2025. He's older half-sister Mica, is the current representative of the Pampanga's 3rd district since 2025.

== Electoral history ==
Electoral history of Brenz Gonzales
Year	Office	Party	Votes received				Result
Year	Office	Party	Total	%	P.	Swing	Result
2022	Councilor of San Fernando, Pampanga	KAMBILAN	82,006	—N/a	1st	—N/a	Won
2025	Vice Mayor of San Fernando, Pampanga	PFP	128,191	79.14%	1st	—N/a	Won
