= Bong Pineda =

Filipino businessman (born 1949)

- Born: Rodolfo Quijano Pineda; December 21, 1949 (age 76)
- Occupation: Businessman
- Spouse: Lilia Garcia
- Children: 5 including, Dennis, Mylyn and Esmeralda

Rodolfo "Bong" Quijano Pineda (born December 21, 1949) is a Filipino businessman based in Pampanga. A controversial figure who is often accused of perpetrating illegal gambling operations, he is known for being the patriarch of a political family and for his influence in politics in the province.

== Business career; accusations of illegal gambling ==
Bong Pineda was born on December 21, 1949, to Jose Salazar Pineda and Rosario Fran Quijano. Raised on the income his father made from operations involving the Spanish card game monte, Pineda later got involved in monte himself in 1969 when he became an aide of a Pampanga congressman who was also a monte operator. He later became overseer of that politician's monte operations in Rizal, San Juan (Metro Manila), and Quezon City.

Pineda has been associated with jueteng, a numbers games which is illegal in the Philippines. He allegedly struck a fortune from the game in 1986. For his alleged involvement, several arrest warrants have been issued against him since May 1990, with him being briefly arrested by the National Bureau of Investigation in April 1991. By 2000, police intelligence reports cited him as heading 80% of jueteng operations in Pampanga. He has denied allegations of involvement in jueteng.

In 2000, Sheila Coronel of the Philippine Center for Investigative Journalism reported that the Pinedas' alleged gambling operations, tolerated by numerous police and church officials, were able to fund their regular donation drives in Lubao, which "ensures that the Pinedas have loyal and enduring grassroots support in their hometown."

In 2016, Bong Pineda donated a 8 hectares (20 acres) lot where a new municipal hall complex for Lubao was constructed. In 2019, Bong Pineda led the ground breaking ceremony for the Pradera Verde a development in Lubao which includes an amusement park and a motor racing track. He also led the construction of three Roman Catholic chapels in San Fernando.

Belvedere Corp. is owned by Pineda. The company has a legal license to provide online cockfighting or e-sabong from the state-owned regulator Philippine Amusement and Gaming Corporation. However, in May 2022, the government ordered the shut-down of e-sabong nationwide with Bong Pineda's son Dennis implementing the directive in Pampanga where the younger Pineda serves as governor.

== Political involvement ==
Bong Pineda is the patriarch of a political family in Pampanga with the town of Lubao regarded as his hometown. While he has not held office himself, Pineda is regarded as a "kingmaker" in his family's alliance with President Gloria Macapagal Arroyo, whose political rise was alleged to have been assisted by Pineda. Both his wife Lilia Garcia and son Dennis have served as mayor of Lubao and provincial governor of Pampanga. His daughters Esmeralda Pineda and Mylyn Pineda-Cayabyab have also served as Lubao mayor, with Cayabyab later serving as a provincial board member and attempting to run for mayor in San Fernando in 2025. On the day before Arroyo was arrested at the Veterans Memorial Medical Center on October 4, 2012, her son Mikey was joined by the Pineda children in filing her certificate of candidacy for Pampanga 2nd district representative before the Commission on Elections.

Pineda has also supported the electoral bid of other politicians in Pampanga. Aside from president Arroyo, he has been claimed to have helped the political careers of President Joseph Estrada and the Lapid family in Pampanga. In 2004, he admitted to assisting the political campaigns of actor Lito Lapid and his son Mark Lapid in the 2004 elections.

He is reputed to avoid public appearances and the media.
