= Pampanga's 3rd congressional district =

Congressional district of the Philippines

- Constituency for the House of Representatives of the Philippines
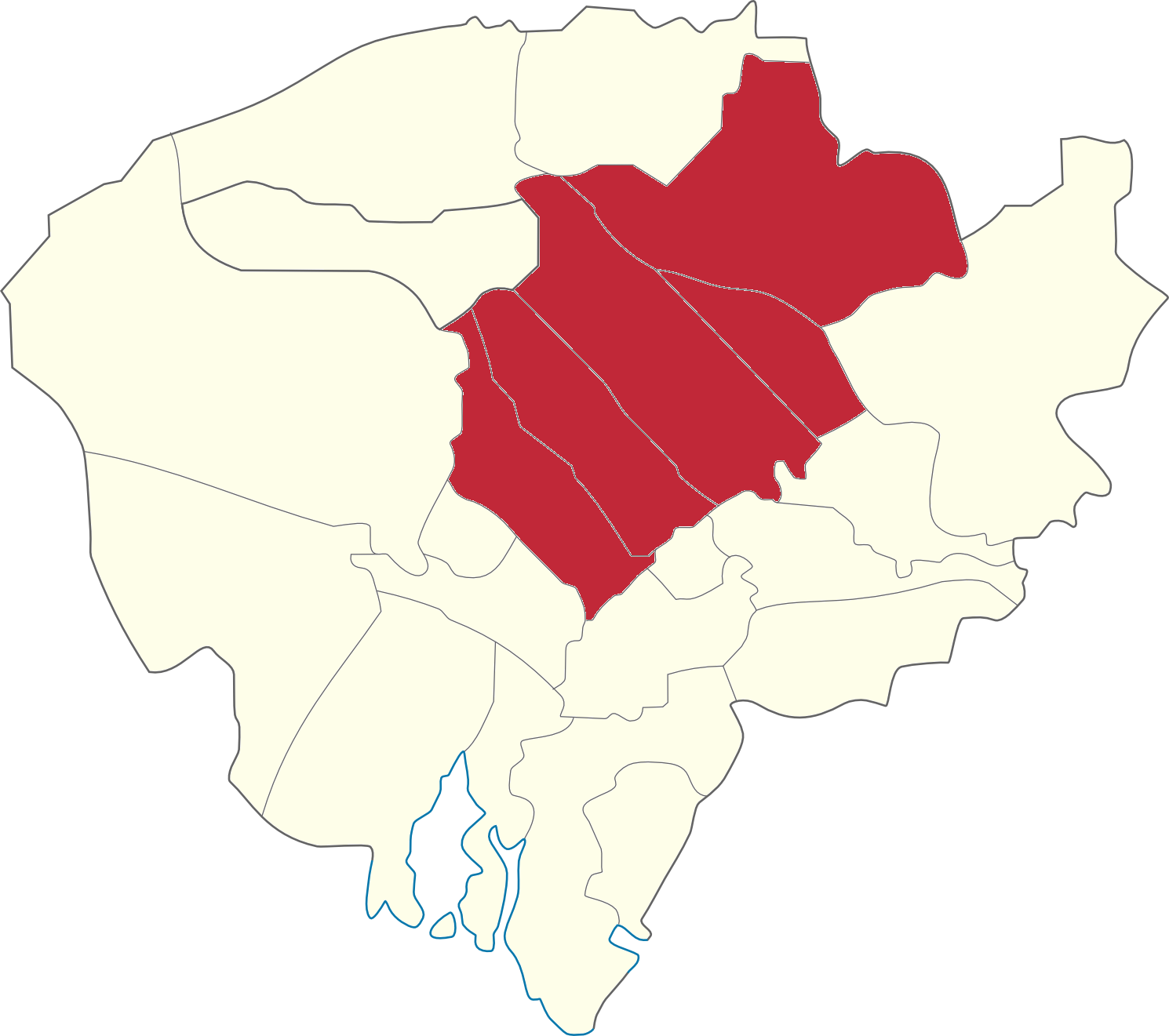
- Boundary of Pampanga's 3rd congressional district in Pampanga

- Location of Pampanga within the Philippines
- Province: Pampanga
- Region: Central Luzon
- Population: 782,547 (2020)
- Electorate: 439,078 (2022)
- Major settlements: 5 LGUs: Cities; San Fernando; Municipalities; Arayat; Bacolor; Mexico; Santa Ana
- Area: 431.17 km^{2} (166.48 sq mi)

Current constituency
- Created: 1987
- Representative: Mica Gonzales
- Political party: Lakas–CMD
- Congressional bloc: Majority

Pampanga's 3rd congressional district is one of the four congressional districts of the Philippines in the province of Pampanga. It has been represented in the House of Representatives since 1987. The district consists of the provincial capital city of San Fernando and adjacent municipalities of Arayat, Bacolor, Mexico and Santa Ana. It is currently represented in the 20th Congress by Mica Gonzales of the Lakas–CMD.

== Representation history ==
#	Image	Member	Term of office		Congress	Party	Electoral history	Constituent LGUs
#	Image	Member	Start	End	Congress	Party	Electoral history	Constituent LGUs
=== Pampanga's 3rd district for the House of Representatives of the Philippines ===
District created February 2, 1987.
1		Oscar Samson Rodriguez	June 30, 1987	June 30, 1992	8th	LnB	Elected in 1987.	1987–present Arayat, Bacolor, Mexico, San Fernando, Santa Ana
1		Oscar Samson Rodriguez	June 30, 1987	June 30, 1992	8th	PDP–Laban	Elected in 1987.	1987–present Arayat, Bacolor, Mexico, San Fernando, Santa Ana
2		Andrea D. Domingo	June 30, 1992	June 30, 1995	9th	Lakas	Elected in 1992.	1987–present Arayat, Bacolor, Mexico, San Fernando, Santa Ana
(1)		Oscar Samson Rodriguez	June 30, 1995	June 30, 2004	10th	LDP	Elected in 1995.	1987–present Arayat, Bacolor, Mexico, San Fernando, Santa Ana
(1)		Oscar Samson Rodriguez	June 30, 1995	June 30, 2004	11th	Lakas	Re-elected in 1998.	1987–present Arayat, Bacolor, Mexico, San Fernando, Santa Ana
(1)		Oscar Samson Rodriguez	June 30, 1995	June 30, 2004	12th	Lakas	Re-elected in 2001.	1987–present Arayat, Bacolor, Mexico, San Fernando, Santa Ana
3		Rey Aquino	June 30, 2004	June 30, 2007	13th	Lakas	Elected in 2004.	1987–present Arayat, Bacolor, Mexico, San Fernando, Santa Ana
4		Aurelio Gonzales Jr.	June 30, 2007	June 30, 2013	14th	KAMPI	Elected in 2007.	1987–present Arayat, Bacolor, Mexico, San Fernando, Santa Ana
4		Aurelio Gonzales Jr.	June 30, 2007	June 30, 2013	14th	Lakas	Elected in 2007.	1987–present Arayat, Bacolor, Mexico, San Fernando, Santa Ana
4		Aurelio Gonzales Jr.	June 30, 2007	June 30, 2013	15th	NPC	Re-elected in 2010.	1987–present Arayat, Bacolor, Mexico, San Fernando, Santa Ana
(1)		Oscar Samson Rodriguez	June 30, 2013	June 30, 2016	16th	Liberal	Elected in 2013.	1987–present Arayat, Bacolor, Mexico, San Fernando, Santa Ana
(4)		Aurelio Gonzales Jr.	June 30, 2016	June 30, 2025	17th	NPC	Elected in 2016.	1987–present Arayat, Bacolor, Mexico, San Fernando, Santa Ana
(4)		Aurelio Gonzales Jr.	June 30, 2016	June 30, 2025	17th	PDP–Laban (KAMBILAN)	Elected in 2016.	1987–present Arayat, Bacolor, Mexico, San Fernando, Santa Ana
(4)		Aurelio Gonzales Jr.	June 30, 2016	June 30, 2025	18th	PDP–Laban (KAMBILAN)	Re-elected in 2019.	1987–present Arayat, Bacolor, Mexico, San Fernando, Santa Ana
(4)		Aurelio Gonzales Jr.	June 30, 2016	June 30, 2025	19th	Independent	Re-elected in 2022.	1987–present Arayat, Bacolor, Mexico, San Fernando, Santa Ana
(4)		Aurelio Gonzales Jr.	June 30, 2016	June 30, 2025	19th	Lakas	Re-elected in 2022.	1987–present Arayat, Bacolor, Mexico, San Fernando, Santa Ana
5		Alyssa Michaela Gonzales	June 30, 2025	Incumbent	20th	Lakas	Elected in 2025.	1987–present Arayat, Bacolor, Mexico, San Fernando, Santa Ana

== Election results ==
=== 2025 ===
2025 Philippine House of Representatives elections
Candidate	Party	Votes	%
Mica Gonzales	Lakas–CMD	213,914	55.07
Hazel Tumang	Nacionalista Party	165,155	42.52
Paul Quiwa	Aksyon Demokratiko	9,346	2.41
Total		388,415	100.00
Valid votes		388,415	94.54
Invalid/blank votes		22,446	5.46
Total votes		410,861	100.00
Registered voters/turnout		475,143	86.47
Lakas–CMD hold			
Source: Commission on Elections

=== 2022 ===
2022 Philippine House of Representatives elections
Party	Candidate	Votes	%
PDP–Laban	Aurelio Gonzales Jr. (incumbent)	280,375	100
Total votes		280,375	100
PDP–Laban hold			

=== 2019 ===
2019 Philippine House of Representatives elections
Party	Candidate	Votes	%
PDP–Laban	Aurelio Gonzales Jr. (incumbent)	226,785	90.82
Independent	Cecilia Canlas	20,809	9.18
Total votes			100
PDP–Laban hold			

=== 2016 ===
2016 Philippine House of Representatives elections
Party	Candidate	Votes	%
NPC	Aurelio Gonzales Jr.	137,786	
Liberal	Oscar Samson Rodriguez (incumbent)	123,935	
Independent	Pol Quiwa	3,260	
Independent	Amado Santos	3,069	
Invalid or blank votes		25,113	
Total votes		293,163	
NPC gain from Liberal			

=== 2013 ===
2013 Philippine House of Representatives elections
Party	Candidate	Votes	%
Liberal	Oscar Samson Rodriguez	125,511	53.88
NPC	Aurelio Gonzales Jr. (incumbent)	95,437	40.97
Margin of victory		30,074	12.91%
Invalid or blank votes		12,015	5.16
Total votes		232,963	100.00
Liberal gain from NPC			

=== 2010 ===
2010 Philippine House of Representatives elections
Candidate	Party	Votes	%
Aurelio Gonzales Jr. (incumbent)	Lakas–Kampi–CMD	195,651	87.84
Jose Quiwa III	Liberal Party	24,640	11.06
Amado Santos	Independent	2,437	1.09
Total		222,728	100.00
Valid votes		222,728	93.25
Invalid/blank votes		16,134	6.75
Total votes		238,862	100.00
Lakas–Kampi–CMD hold			
Source: Commission on Elections

=== 2007 ===
2007 Philippine House of Representatives elections
Party	Candidate	Votes	%
KAMPI	Aurelio Gonzales Jr.	84,797	
PDSP	Ferdinand "Dinan" Labung	71,506	
NPC	Eligio "Tiger" Lagman	29,158	
Independent	Amado Santos	1,103	
Invalid or blank votes			
Total votes			
KAMPI gain from Lakas			

=== 1998 ===
1998 Philippine House of Representatives elections
Candidate	Party	Votes	%
Oscar Samson Rodriguez (incumbent)	Lakas–NUCD–UMDP	125,640	72.86
Ma. Bernardita Herrera	Nationalist People's Coalition	43,939	25.48
Eligio Mallari	Kabalikat ng Mamamayang Pilipino	2,698	1.56
Eligio Ocampo	Kilusang Bagong Lipunan	152	0.09
Total		172,429	100.00
Source: Commission on Elections

=== 1995 ===
1995 Philippine House of Representatives elections
Candidate	Party	Votes	%
Oscar Samson Rodriguez	Laban ng Demokratikong Pilipino	77,397	57.99
Andrea D. Domingo (incumbent)	Lakas–NUCD–UMDP	56,058	42.01
Total		133,455	100.00
Source: Commission on Elections

=== 1992 ===
1992 Philippine House of Representatives elections
Candidate	Party	Votes	%
Andrea D. Domingo	Lakas–NUCD	68,602	56.19
Oscar Samson Rodriguez (incumbent)	Laban ng Demokratikong Pilipino	45,576	37.33
Vicente Macalino	Nationalist People's Coalition	7,468	6.12
Aurelio Villanueva	Kilusang Bagong Lipunan	440	0.36
Total		122,086	100.00
Source: Commission on Elections

== See also ==
- Legislative districts of Pampanga
