= Vivencio Cuyugan =

Filipino politician

The Honorable Vivencio Cuyugan
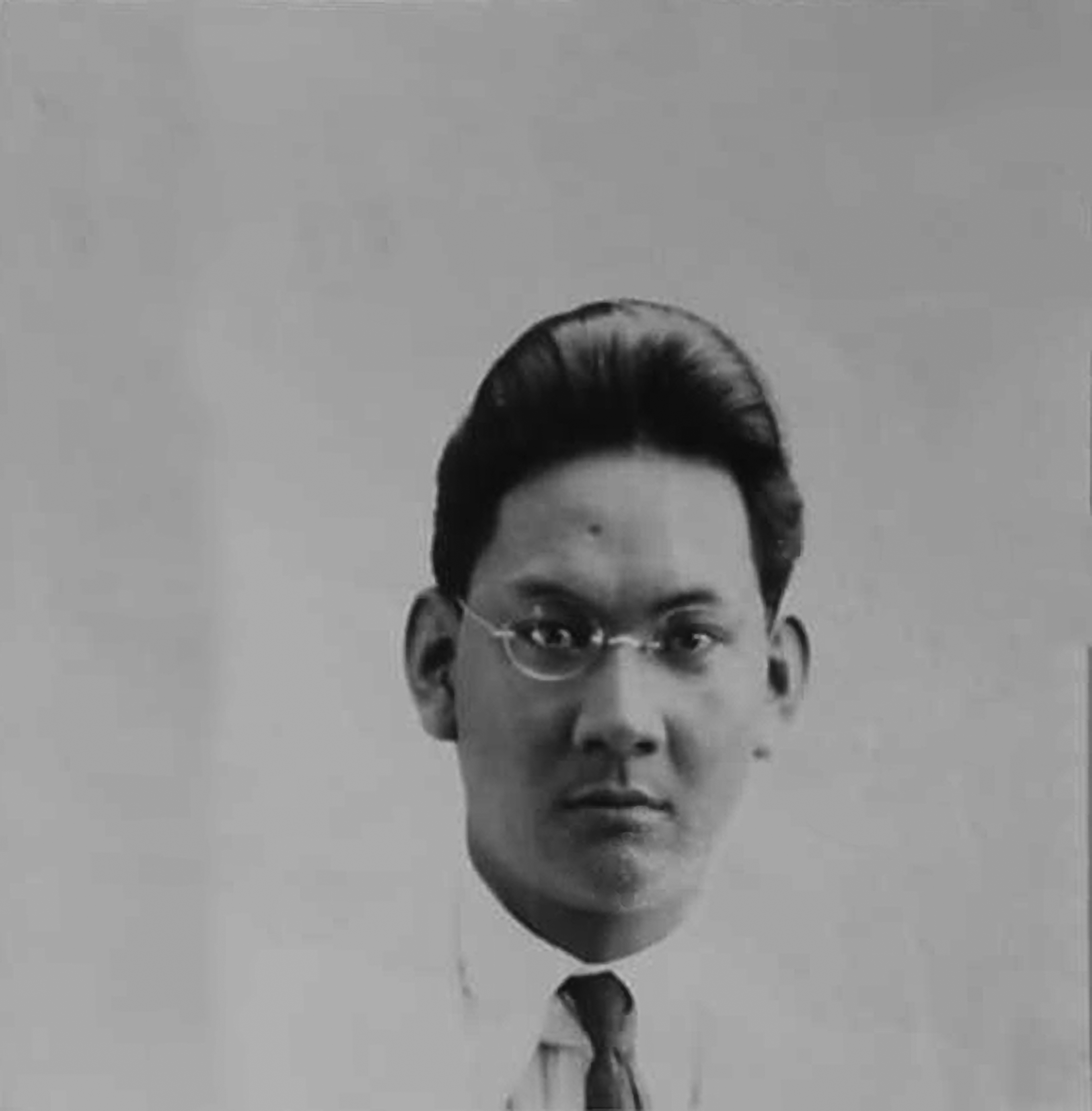
- Cuyugan in 1918

11th Mayor of San Fernando, Pampanga
- In office 1945–1945
- Preceded by: Rodolfo P. Hizon
- Succeeded by: Rodolfo P. Hizon
- In office 1938–1942
- Preceded by: Urbano D. Dizon
- Succeeded by: Rodolfo P. Hizon

Personal details
- Born: Vivencio Cuyugan y Barón; January 13, 1895 San Fernando, Pampanga, Captaincy General of the Philippines
- Died: March 16, 1971 (aged 76) Manila, Philippines
- Party: Partido Komunista ng Pilipinas-1930
- Spouse: Felisa Amurao-Cuyugan
- Children: 6
- Occupation: Politician
- Known for: Mayor of San Fernando, Pampanga; Hukbalahap commander

Vivencio Baron Cuyugan Sr. (born Vivencio Cuyugan y Barón; January 13, 1895 – March 16, 1971) was a Filipino politician, boxer, and one of the founders of the socialist guerrilla group Hukbalahap. He was born in San Fernando, Pampanga, to Saturnino Pamintuan Cuyugan and Antonina Yutuc Baron. He studied in the United States where he supported himself through professional boxing and became known as the "Big Brown Filipino." He was appointed Municipal Vice-President of San Fernando in 1927, and later elected to the same position in 1931. He was later elected the first Municipal Mayor under the Philippine Commonwealth, the first socialist mayor of the Philippines. Together with Pedro Abad Santos, he was among the co-founders of the Socialist Party of the Philippines.

In 2017, the National Historical Commission of the Philippines honored Cuyugan as a hero with a historical marker in San Fernando, Pampanga, for being a "champion of social justice".

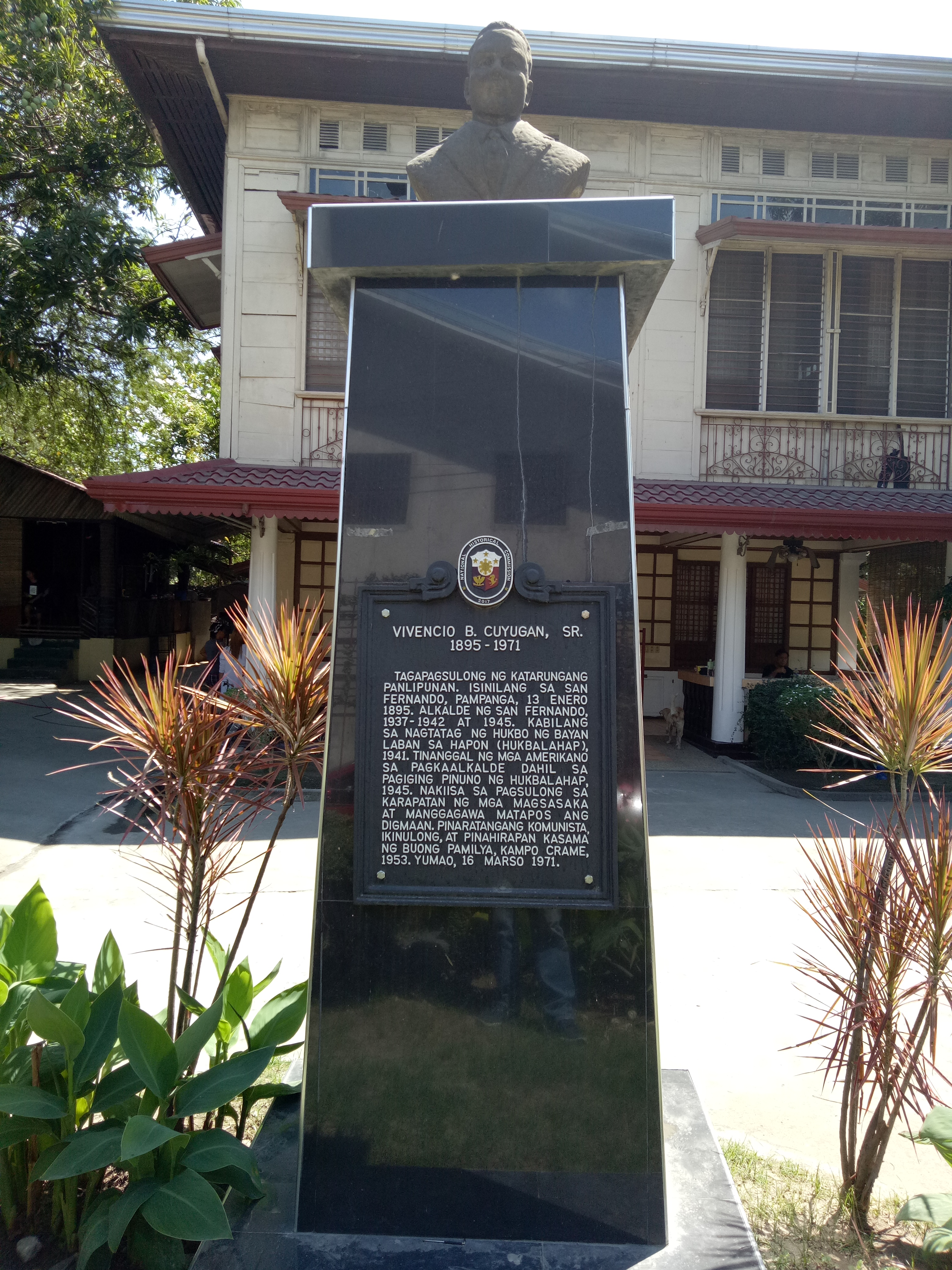
Vivencio B. Cuyugan Sr. monument in San Fernando, Pampanga, Philippines

== Personal life ==
He married Felisa Amurao of Cabiao, Nueva Ecija and had six children by her, namely: Aida, Fernando, Fe, Vivencio Jr., Panopio, and Dr. Ma. Luisa. There were children from other marriages: Estrella, Augustin, Saturnino, Syvestra, Antonia, Carlos, Manuel, and Juliet. He had five brothers and a sister.

== Mayor of San Fernando ==
Cuyugan was the Mayor of San Fernando, Pampanga, from 1937 to 1942 and in 1945. He was also one of the leaders of the Aguman Ding Maldang Tagapagobra (AMT) or the General Workers Union.

== Hukbalahap ==
In 1941, Cuyugan and several others founded the Hukbo ng Bayan Laban sa Hapon (Hukbalahap) and acted as one of its commanders. His wife Felisa joined to support him. She took care of him while he was ill during the war.

== Later life ==
In 1953, he was captured and sent to Camp Crame with his family to be jailed and tortured under the charge of being a communist. While in prison at Camp Crame, his wife Felisa gave birth to a son. He later died in 1971.
