= Oscar Samson Rodriguez =

Filipino lawyer and politician (born 1945)

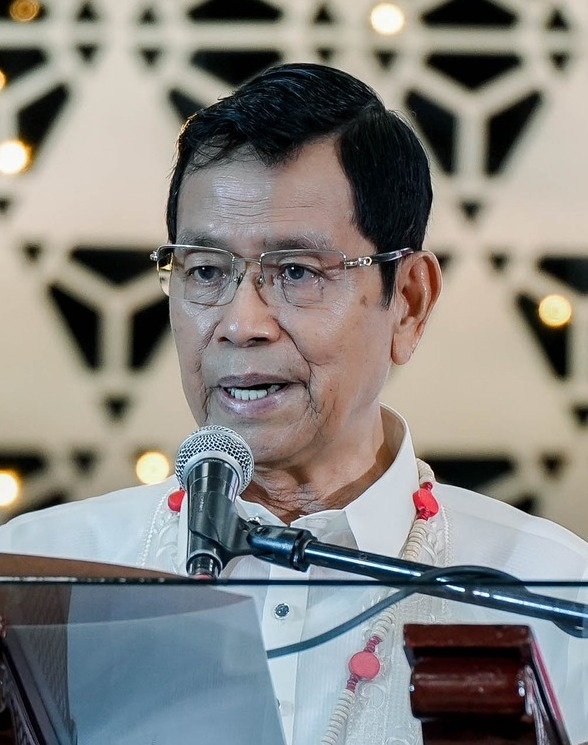
- Rodriguez in 2024

Member of the House of Representatives from Pampanga's 3rd District
- In office June 30, 2013 – June 30, 2016
- Preceded by: Aurelio Gonzales Jr.
- Succeeded by: Aurelio Gonzales Jr.
- In office June 30, 1995 – June 30, 2004
- Preceded by: Andrea D. Domingo
- Succeeded by: Rey Aquino
- In office June 30, 1987 – June 30, 1992
- Preceded by: District established
- Succeeded by: Andrea D. Domingo

31st Mayor of San Fernando, Pampanga
- In office June 30, 2004 – June 30, 2013
- Vice Mayor: Edwin Santiago
- Preceded by: Rey Aquino
- Succeeded by: Edwin Santiago

Personal details
- Born: Oscar Samson Rodriguez; September 19, 1945 (age 81) Santa Ana, Pampanga, Philippine Commonwealth
- Party: Liberal (2009–present)
- Other political affiliations: Lakas (1998–2009); LDP (1992–1998); PDP–Laban (1988–1992); LnB (1987–1988)
- Spouse: Dolores Pabustan
- Children: 5
- Education: Far Eastern University (LL.B.)
- Occupation: Politician
- Profession: Lawyer

Oscar "Oca" Samson Rodriguez (born September 19, 1945) is a Filipino lawyer and politician. He served as representative of the 3rd District of Pampanga in the House of Representatives of the Philippines from 2013 to 2016, a position he previously held from 1995 to 2004 and from 1987 to 1992. He served as the 31st Mayor of San Fernando, Pampanga from 2004 to 2013.

Rodriguez was former president of the League of Cities of the Philippines, chairman of the Regional Development Council of Central Luzon, and vice president of the Union of Local Authorities of the Philippines. He is the founding president of Movement for the Advancement of Young Advocates of Pampanga, and was a prosecutor during the impeachment trial of former President Joseph Estrada.

In 2005, he was one of the finalists for World Mayor.

== Early life and education ==
Oscar Samson Rodriguez was born on September 19, 1945 in Santa Ana, Pampanga to Urbano Rodriguez and Rufina Samson. Rodriguez graduated elementary education at San Pablo Elementary School in Santa Ana and is an alumnus of Pampanga High School. Rodriguez began his career in law as a stenographer in Toledano Colleges (now East Central Colleges) before graduating from Pampanga’s Harvardian Colleges with a Bachelor of Arts degree in 1969 and with a law degree from Far Eastern University in 1973.

== Political career ==
=== House of Representatives ===
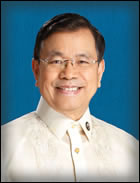
Official portrait of Rodriguez in the 16th Congress

Rodriguez was also the representative of 3rd District of Pampanga from 1987 to 1992, 1995 to 2004, and 2013 to 2016. He authored several laws, including:

- The Republic Act 8990, an act that converted the Municipality of San Fernando, Pampanga into a component city that is now known as the City of San Fernando
- The Republic Act 9225, The Dual Citizenship Law providing for overseas Filipinos to participate in political processes
- The Republic Act 9211, The Tobacco Regulation Act of 2003
- The Republic Act 9173 which seeks to strengthen the Nursing Profession in the Philippines

He has also authored bills that seeks prohibition of political dynasties and amendments to the illegal discharge of firearms.

=== Mayor of San Fernando, Pampanga ===
In 2004, Rodriguez was elected as mayor of San Fernando, Pampanga where he served for three consecutive terms.

In 2022, Rodriguez ran again for mayor of San Fernando, Pampanga but he lost to Vilma Caluag and placed 4th.

== Electoral history ==
Electoral history of Oscar Samson Rodriguez
Year	Office	Party	Votes received				Result
Year	Office	Party	Total	%	P.	Swing	Result
1987	Representative (Pampanga–3rd)	PDP–Laban	—N/a	—N/a	1st	—N/a	Won
1992	Representative (Pampanga–3rd)	LDP	45,576	37.33%	2nd	—N/a	Lost
1995	Representative (Pampanga–3rd)	LDP	77,397	57.99%	1st	—N/a	Won
1998	Representative (Pampanga–3rd)	Lakas	125,640	72.86%	1st	—N/a	Won
2001	Representative (Pampanga–3rd)	Lakas	83,534	—N/a	1st	—N/a	Won
2013	Representative (Pampanga–3rd)	Liberal	125,511	53.88%	1st	—N/a	Won
2016	Representative (Pampanga–3rd)	Liberal	123,935	—N/a	2nd	—N/a	Lost
2004	Mayor of San Fernando, Pampanga	Lakas	—N/a	—N/a	1st	—N/a	Won
2007	Mayor of San Fernando, Pampanga	Lakas	47,772	—N/a	1st	—N/a	Won
2010	Mayor of San Fernando, Pampanga	Liberal	53,119	—N/a	1st	—N/a	Won
2022	Mayor of San Fernando, Pampanga	Liberal	19,512	—N/a	4th	—N/a	Lost
