= Rey Aquino =

Filipino politician and surgeon

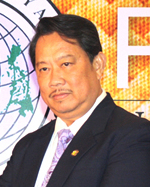
- Aquino in 2011

President and CEO of the Philippine Health Insurance Corporation
- In office April 3, 2009 – October 2011

Acting President of the Philippine Health Insurance Corporation
- In office July 25, 2008 – April 2, 2009

Member of the Philippine House of Representatives from Pampanga's 3rd district
- In office June 30, 2004 – June 30, 2007
- Preceded by: Oscar S. Rodriguez
- Succeeded by: Aurelio Gonzales Jr.

30th Mayor of San Fernando, Pampanga
- In office June 30, 1995 – June 30, 2004
- Vice Mayor: Tiger Lagman
- Preceded by: Paterno Guevarra
- Succeeded by: Oscar S. Rodriguez

Vice Mayor of San Fernando, Pampanga
- In office June 30, 1992 – March 1995
- Mayor: Paterno Guevarra

Personal details
- Born: Jesus Reynaldo Bondoc Aquino; October 31, 1954 (age 71) San Fernando, Pampanga, Philippines
- Party: PDP–Laban (2012–2013); Lakas (1995–2007); Nacionalista (1992–1995)
- Spouse: Edna Soliman
- Children: 5
- Education: University of Santo Tomas (BS) (MD)
- Occupation: Surgeon, Politician, Civil servant

Jesus Reynaldo “Rey” Bondoc Aquino (born October 31, 1954) is a Filipino politician and surgeon who is the last municipal Mayor of San Fernando and its first Mayor when it became a city. He also served as Congressman for the 3rd district of Pampanga from June 30, 2004, to June 30, 2007. From 2008 to 2011, Aquino also acted as the President and chief executive officer of the Philippine Health Insurance or PhilHealth.

Voted as the Most Outstanding Mayor of the Philippines in 2002, the town of San Fernando was transformed into a city under Aquino's reign through the ratification of Republic Act 8990.

== Early life and education ==
Jesus Reynaldo B. Aquino was born at Barrio Baritan (known now as Barangay, Sta. Teresita), San Fernando, Pampanga. The fourth of five siblings, he grew up in a family with fairly modest means. His father Narciso was an employee of the Pampanga Sugar Development Company (PASUDECO), a local sugar processing company, and his mother, Aurora, had a shop in the market where she sold various garments and textiles. It is on this shop where he stayed on weekends to shine shoes for passersby to help augment the family's income.

Aquino received his Elementary Education at Don Bosco Academy, and his Secondary Education at University of the Assumption, respectively.

At University of Santo Tomas (UST), Aquino finished both his bachelor's degree in Science – General, and Doctor of Medicine degree there.

Aside from being ranked as a top ten student, Aquino also received the Model Student of the Year Award when he graduated high school at University of the Assumption for his active role in the school's activities coupled with his excellent academic performance.

While studying at UST, Aquino also garnered the leadership award for his ability to manage and organize events of great relevance to the university.

== Medical career ==
Aquino first showed glimpses of his leadership capabilities when he was in San Luis Pampanga, a mostly rural town, at San Luis District Hospital to complete his student requirements for a six-month rural rotation. Aquino endeared himself there with the people of San Luis, and was instrumental in motivating the local townsfolk to help and contribute in the various community efforts that benefited the area (maintaining the cleanliness of the hospital, etc.). It was also in San Luis where he received the news that he passed the medical board exam.

After obtaining his medical degree from UST, Aquino again chose to go back in his home province, Pampanga, to start his postgraduate internship at a hospital there – Central Luzon Regional Hospital (now named Jose B. Lingad Memorial Regional Hospital or JBL).

== Political career ==
=== OIC and Vice-Mayor ===
As the elected president of the Kiwanis and Jaycee clubs, Aquino was chosen and appointed as an Officer in Charge or OIC councilor in 1987. His tenure as OIC lasted for 2 months, and was his first real experience in politics.

In 1992, Rosve Henson, who was running for mayor and an acquaintance of Aquino from the Kiwanis Club requested Aquino to be his running mate for vice-mayor in San Fernando. He eventually won, although Henson did not.

=== Mayoralty (1995–2004) ===
==== 1995 ====
Aquino was mayor of San Fernando on three occasions, but his first bid in 1995 for the mayoralty that proved to be the most difficult. He was facing off against the then incumbent Mayor, Paterno “Pat” Guevarra, and other seasoned, better funded and more experienced politicians like Rosve Henson (his former running mate) and Mario Garcia. Surveys also consistently ranked him fourth behind the aforementioned opponents.

However, his strong past performance as vice-mayor, the relentless campaigning of his wife, Edna, and Mario Garcia's endorsement of him later in the campaign (when it was becoming apparent that he too would not win) would prove pivotal and crucial in his bid for the mayoralty. Aquino would later win the election by a mere 1,200 votes against the heavily favored Mayor Pat Guevarra.

==== 1998 and 2001 ====
In the 1998 and 2001 elections, Aquino squared off again with his old political rival and former San Fernando Mayor Pat Guevarra. This time however, he would go on to win quite easily and with substantially more votes on both occasions to retain the position of Mayor.

=== House of Representatives (2004–2007) ===
Portrait of Aquino during the 13th Congress

After his three terms as mayor of San Fernando, He ran for Congress in 2004 and won.

=== President and CEO of PhilHealth ===
On August 13, 2008, President Gloria Macapagal Arroyo picked Aquino to be the president and CEO of the Philippine Health Insurance Corporation (PhilHealth), a tax-exempt, government owned and controlled corporation (GOCC) of the Philippines, which is attached to the Department of Health.

== Trivia ==
- During his term as the mayor of San Fernando, Aquino lobbied for the cityhood of the then San Fernando town. Three hard years of nonstop campaigning in Congress and in the Senate to turn the 300-year-old town into a city eventually proved triumphant with the ratification of the Republic Act 8990. As a result of this, San Fernando's yearly internal revenue budget significantly grew from P70 million to P 210 million.
- Aquino saved San Fernando from further damage caused by the eruption of Mount Pinatubo and the subsequent lahar and flooding that followed by leading the Save San Fernando Foundation Incorporated (SSFI) which paved way for the construction of Megadike.
- Aquino increased the flow of investments and employment in the City of San Fernando by allowing S.M. (Shoemart) to build a mall that will benefit Fernandinos in the long run. Robinsons Star Mills Pampanga soon followed thereafter owing to the strong reception received by SM City Pampanga.
- Aquino was the last municipal mayor of San Fernando, and the first mayor in its conversion of becoming a city.
- While he was vice-mayor, Aquino sought to make the Sangguniang Bayan (an assembly that passes ordinances and resolutions to the municipality) sessions more accessible and nearer to the masses by holding them in the barangay halls where more people can come and voice their opinions.
- When he was in Congress, Aquino carried over the Project REY or Reading Excellence for the Youth from his last term as mayor. The program aimed at increasing the reading comprehension of young students, and to instill in them a love for reading and studying.
- Aquino significantly grew the benefits of members of PhilHealth by up to 35 percent while he was CEO and president, the highest so far.
