= Aurelio Gonzales Jr. =

Filipino civil engineer and politician (born 1962)

Aurelio D. Gonzales Jr.
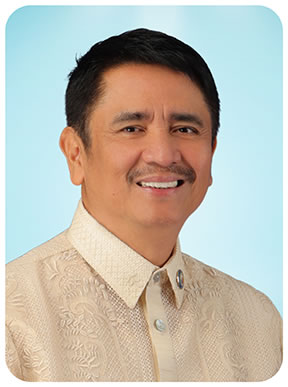
- Gonzales during the 19th Congress

Senior Deputy Speaker of the House of Representatives of the Philippines
- In office July 27, 2022 (Note: Serving as Deputy Speaker from July 27, 2022 until May 17, 2023 and as Senior Deputy Speaker since May 17, 2023) – June 30, 2025
- House Speaker: Martin Romualdez
- In office July 22, 2019 – December 7, 2020
- House Speaker: Alan Peter Cayetano; Lord Allan Velasco

Member of the House of Representatives from Pampanga's 3rd district
- In office June 30, 2016 – June 30, 2025
- Preceded by: Oscar S. Rodriguez
- Succeeded by: Mica Gonzales
- In office June 30, 2007 – June 30, 2013
- Preceded by: Rey Aquino
- Succeeded by: Oscar S. Rodriguez

Member of the Pampanga Provincial Board from the 3rd district
- In office June 30, 2004 – June 30, 2007 Serving with Ceferino Laus and Johnny Quiambao

Personal details
- Born: Aurelio Dueñas Gonzales Jr. October 27, 1962 (age 64) San Fernando, Pampanga, Philippines
- Party: Lakas (2008–2011; 2023–present)
- Other political affiliations: Independent (2023); KAMBILAN (2018–2024); PDP–Laban (2016–2023); NPC (2011–2016); KAMPI (2007–2008); Buklod Capampangan (2001–2007); Lakas (I) (before 2001)
- Spouse(s): Elizabeth Panlilio (died 2017) Michaeline Mercado
- Children: 5, including Mica and Brenz
- Education: Mapúa Institute of Technology (BS)
- Occupation: Businessman, politician
- Profession: Civil engineer

Aurelio "Dong" Dueñas Gonzales Jr. (born October 27, 1962) is a Filipino politician, civil engineer, and businessman who served as representative of the 3rd District of Pampanga from 2016 to 2025, a position he previously held from 2007 to 2013.

== Early life and education ==
Gonzales was born at the Virgen de los Remedios Hospital in Barangay San Jose in San Fernando, Pampanga on October 27, 1962 to Aurelio Gonzales Sr. and Cezaria Dueñas. He was raised in Barangay Anao in Mexico, Pampanga. He studied Anao Elementary School and Anao National High School for his primary and secondary education. He took up Civil Engineering at the Mapua Institute of Technology. In 1987, He passed the Civil Engineering board exam.

== Political career ==
=== Pampanga Provincial Board (2004–2007) ===
Before becoming a congressman, he was a board member for the same district for one term before running for Congress.

=== House of Representatives (2007–2013; 2016–2025) ===
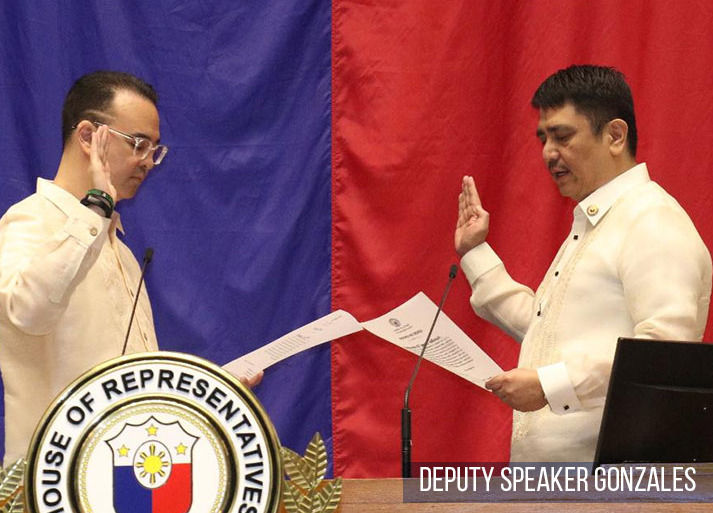
Gonzales taking his oath of office as Deputy House Speaker on July 27, 2019

He won the 2007 election against Dinan Labung and Tiger Lagman.

He was one of the signatories of House Resolution 1109 in 2009 calling for a constituent assembly to amend the Constitution.

He ran for representative in the 2013 elections and received a total of 108,275 votes, but lost to Oscar Samson Rodriguez.

In 2020, Gonzales supported the franchise renewal of ABS-CBN.

In November 2023, Gonzales left PDP-Laban to join the Lakas–CMD party. On February 5, 2025, Gonzales was among the 95 Lakas–CMD members who voted to impeach vice president Sara Duterte.

== Controversies ==
=== Paskuhan Village ===
The Court of Appeals of the Philippines' Fourth Division Decision dated May 23, 2024, granted Gonzales Jr.'s certiorari annulling Regional Trial Court, Branch 42, San Fernando, Pampanga's judgment. The ruling allowed Gonzalez' intervention in the compromise agreement between San Fernando City and Premier Central, Inc.'s ₱939 million sale of Paskuhan Village. The "deed of donation" transferred to San Fernando 5,000 square meters (54,000 sq ft) of the 9.3 hectares (23 acres) sold to Premier Central, Inc. and a 2-story building, and a company would construct an amphitheater. Gonzales was granted the right to file complaints on the Tourism Infrastructure and Enterprise Zone Authority sale decision of Paskuhan Village to Premier Central Inc. (PCI) in 2014 for ₱939 million.

=== Flood control issues ===
On September 27, 2023, Gonzales faced a graft complaint filed by barangay captain Terence Napao for ₱612 million of projects.

On August 7, 2026, Terence Napao filed a plunder case against Gonzales for connection with two flood control projects worth ₱359.37 million.

On October 19, 2026, Gonzales posted ₱180,000 bail in two of three of the graft cases against him.

On October 20, 2026, Gonzales was dismissed to the plunder case due to lack of evidence.

== Personal life ==
Gonzales was married to Elizabeth Mendiola Panlilio until her death at the 2017 Resorts World Manila attack on June 2, 2017. Their only child named Aurelio Brenz (incumbent Vice Mayor of San Fernando, Pampanga and named after Bren Guiao).

Gonzales later married his second wife, Michaeline "My-My" de Guzman Mercado. Mercado is currently serving as a member in the Pampanga Provincial Board for the 3rd district since 2025. Together, they have children named Aurelio III, Aurelio Michaeline, Michael Aurelio and Alyssa Michaela (incumbent Representative from Pampanga's 3rd district).

== Electoral history ==
Electoral history of Aurelio Gonzales Jr.
Year	Office	Party		Votes received				Result
Year	Office	Local	National	Total	%	P.	Swing	Result
2004	Board Member (Pampanga–3rd)	Buklod Capampangan	—N/a	—N/a	—N/a	2nd	—N/a	Won
2007	Representative (Pampanga–3rd)	—N/a	KAMPI	84,797	—N/a	1st	—N/a	Won
2010	Representative (Pampanga–3rd)	—N/a	Lakas–Kampi	195,651	87.84%	1st	—N/a	Won
2013	Representative (Pampanga–3rd)	—N/a	NPC	95,437	40.97%	2nd	—N/a	Lost
2016	Representative (Pampanga–3rd)	—N/a	NPC	137,786	—N/a	1st	—N/a	Won
2019	Representative (Pampanga–3rd)	KAMBILAN	PDP–Laban	226,785	90.82%	1st	—N/a	Won
2022	Representative (Pampanga–3rd)	KAMBILAN	PDP–Laban	280,375	100.00%	1st	—N/a	Unopposed
