= Dayrit =

Dayrit is a surname. Notable people with the surname include:

- Amando G. Dayrit (1912–1944), Filipino journalist
- Conrado Dayrit (1919–2007), Filipino scientist
- Fabian Dayrit, Filipino chemist
- Francisco Dayrit Sr. (1907–1983), Filipino fencer
- Nicolasa Dayrit Panlilio (1874–1945)
- Ryden Dayrit (2012-)
