= Kusinang Matua =

Kapampangan cuisine restaurant

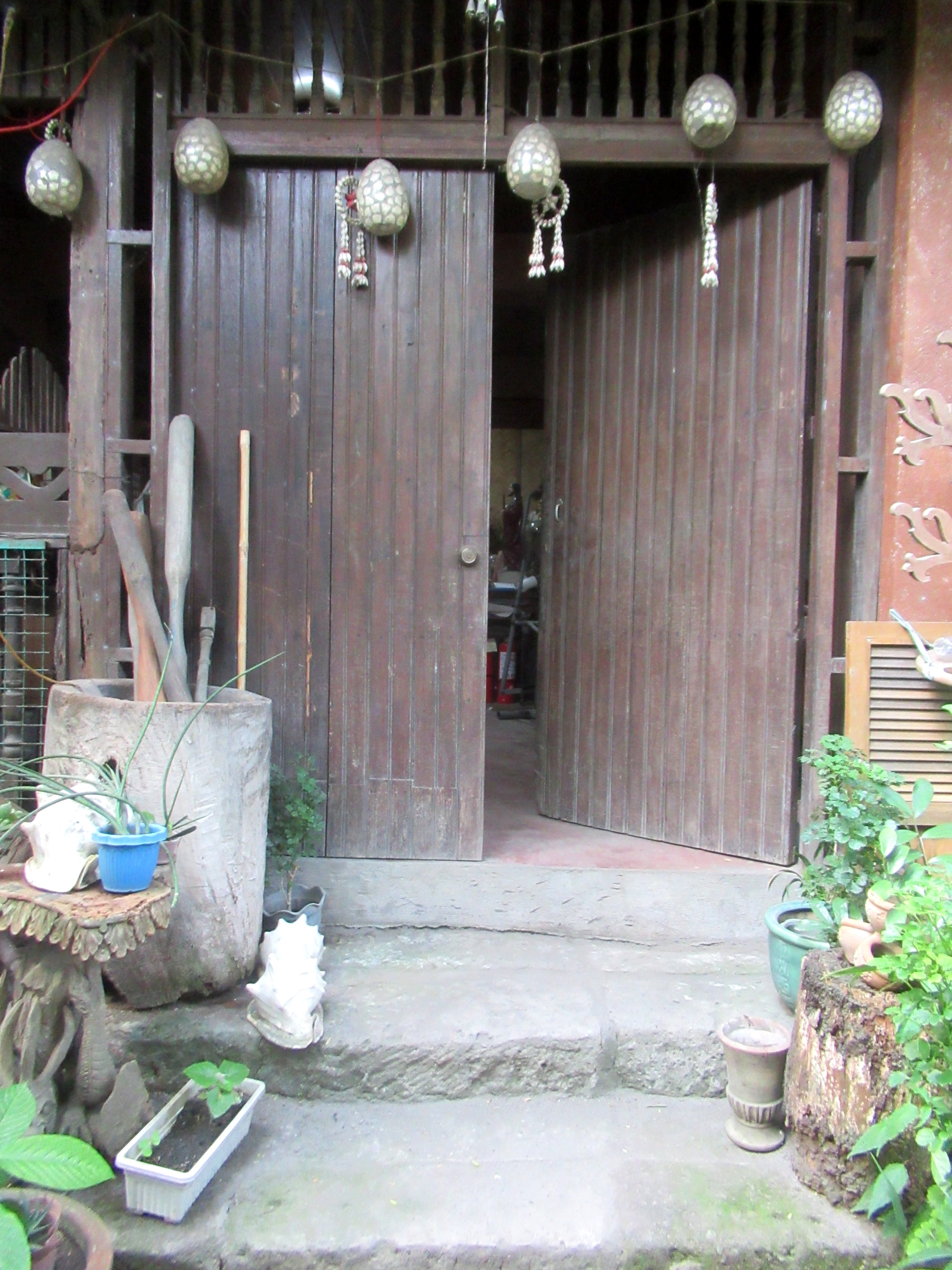
- Entrance to the restaurant
- Interactive map of Kusinang Matua

Restaurant information
- Head chef: Atching Lillian
- Food type: Kapampangan cuisine
- Location: 2021-174 Jose Abad Santos Avenue, Mexico, Pampanga, Philippines
- Coordinates: 15°3′41.352″N 120°43′8.452″E

Kusinang Matua, or Kusinang Matua ng Atching Lillian (lit. 'Old kitchen of Elder Sister Lillian'), is an al fresco buffet restaurant in Parian, Mexico, Pampanga, the Philippines, run by the food historian and Kapampangan cuisine chef dubbed as "The Guardian Angel of Kapampangan Cuisine", Lillian Lising-Borromeo (better known as Atching Lillian).

== Description ==
The restaurant, set within Atching Lillian's ancestral home with its 200-year-old kitchen, is for reservation only and is known for its heirloom recipes of Kapampangan cooking using fresh ingredients, including those found in the house's garden. It is also known for its panecillos de San Nicolas (or Saniculas cookies), one of the oldest cookies of the Philippines introduced by the Augustinians during the Spanish colonial period.

The restaurant is especially known for its chef's lessons about the origins of Kapampangan food and original methods of preparing them, including on the 17th-century recipe for the humble sisig (called sisig antigo) that, unknown to consumers of modern versions of the popular dish, includes the ingredient dayap, which the restaurant grows in its backyard. Aside from the sisig, the restaurant features authentic versions of the bobotong asan (stuffed milkfish), the Kapampangan morcón, the Kapampangan pisto, the tejada de kamatis, the brazo de mais, the tocino de cielo, and the classic Philippine adobo.

== Atching Lillian ==
The Office of the Governor of Pampanga and Holy Angel University have dubbed Kusinang Matua's owner and chef as "The Guardian Angel of Kapampangan Cuisine" while Yummy has called her "The Gatekeeper to Kapampangan Cuisine". Vikings, an all-you-can-eat restaurant chain, has also hired Atching Lillian as a consultant for their Kapampangan food section menu.
