= Atching Lillian =

Filipino food historian and chef

- Born: 23 September 1940 (age 85)
- Education: Philippine Women's University
- Culinary career
- Cooking style: Traditional and modern Kapampangan cuisine, pastry
- Current restaurant: Kusinang Matua
- Award(s) won: 2012 Most Outstanding Kapampangan Award (Culture category) and "Guardian of the Kapampangan Kitchen" title 2019 Holy Angel University "Guardian Angel of Kapampangan Cooking" title

YouTube information
- Channel: Atching Lillian
- Years active: 2020–present
- Genre: Vlogging
- Subscribers: 15.5 thousand
- Last updated: May 28, 2025

Lillian Borromeo (née Lising; born 23 September 1940), commonly referred to as Atching Lillian (lit. 'Elder Sister Lillian'), is a Filipino food historian and chef, best known for her dedication to preserving Filipino heirloom recipes and old methods of food preparation, especially those belonging to Kapampangan cuisine. She turned the old kitchen in her ancestral home in Mexico, Pampanga, into an open-air buffet restaurant that can accommodate up to a little over 50 diners; named Kusinang Matua, it is where she cooks and serves her collected heirloom recipes, and where she has on display cooking implements used by several generations of chefs. The ancestral house itself has been serving as the studio for her cooking vlog titled Cucina Cu, Cucina Mu, started during the COVID-19 pandemic.

Atching Lillian has also been sharing as well as crowdsourcing Kapampangan heritage recipes through her Facebook group Kusinero’t Kusinera, named after Kusinero't Kusinerang Kapampangan, the non-profit organization she founded in 2012 to advocate for the promotion of Pampanga's classic recipes.

== Specialty ==
Among the notable recipes Atching Lillian cooks and serves at Kusinang Matua is the resultant dish from the old way of Philippine adobo cooking, which features no soy sauce and has thus been called adobong puti (white adobo).

In a feature article, ABS-CBN News recommended Kusinang Matua's versions of the bobotong asan (a Kapampangan dish served during the election season, using boneless bangus stuffed with julienned kamias fruit, tomatoes, alagao leaves, and onions sprinkled with oil and soy sauce), the ensaladang pako na may itlog ng bayawak (edible fern salad topped with a monitor lizard's egg), the morcón, the pork sisig, the quilayin (a dish similar to the dinuguan with less blood and more pork offals), the buru (dip for boiled mustard leaves, eggplants, and ampalaya), the bringhe (itself a Kapampangan version of the Spanish paella, using turmeric, sticky rice, coconut milk, chicken, chorizo and bell peppers), the puchero (which, unlike the typical puchero, uses chicken sauteed in garlic, onions and tomatoes), the pritong hito (catfish abundant in Mexico, Pampanga, fried), and Atching Lillian's Sanikulas cookies.

Where in Pampanga has also recommended Kusinang Matua's tocino del cielo dessert, which is another Spanish influence.

Meanwhile, Yummy.ph noted that what makes Atching Lillian's sisig unique is the dayap (key lime) that she uses to sisig (sour) the dish's boiled-then-fried-then-chopped pork's head meat; Atching Lillian grows her own dayap in her ancestral house's yard. The website also recommended Kusinang Matua's bobotong asan, noting that the recipe was developed before women could vote and thus was used as an outlet for gathering in the kitchen in order to vote on what vegetables could be put in, as well as Atching Lillian's morcón, which the website notes is more similar to the embutido of Filipino cuisine.

=== The panecillo de San Nicolas ===
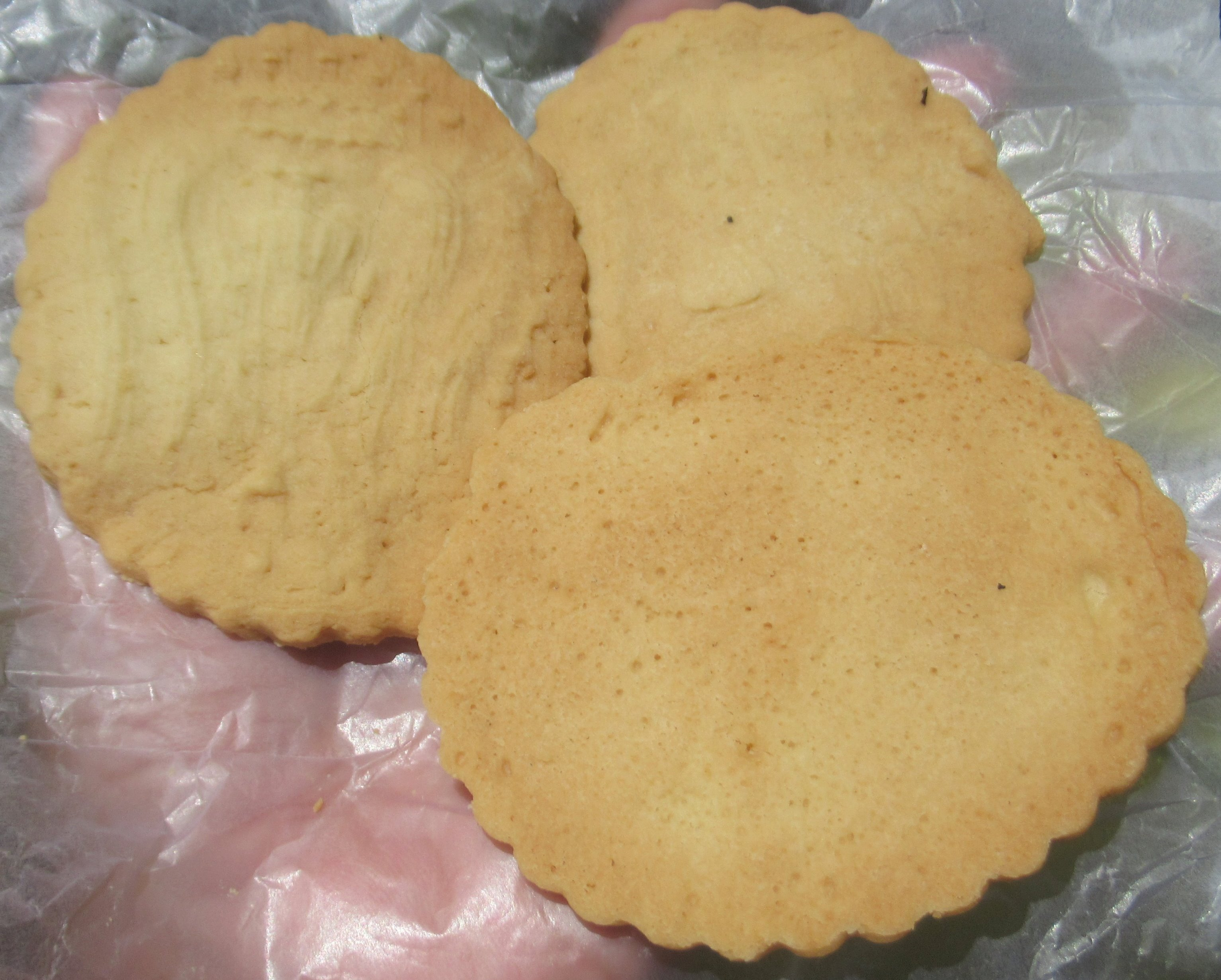
Kusinang Matua's Saniculas cookies

A snack or dessert feature at Kusinang Matua is the San Nicolas cookie, also called panecillo de San Nicolas (small bread of Saint Nicholas) or Saniculas (also spelled Sanikulas) cookie, which is a religious treat dedicated to the patron saint of bakers whose stamp is on the cookie. It traces its origins to the Spanish colonial era when it was introduced to Filipinos by the Augustinians. Atching Lillian's San Nicolas cookies were the first to make a name for the chef, who was then fresh out of college, graduating with a Home Economics degree from the Philippine Women's University. ABS-CBN News' 2016 feature article mentions that the chef still used the 300-year-old recipe she unearthed from archival research during her college days, and many of the wooden molds she used to shape the cookies were themselves over 100 years old. The pastry is traditionally made using arrowroot, sugar, egg yolks, flour, and dayap.

According to Atching Lillian, the recipe for the cookies was originally taught to the female cooks of Pampanga by nuns in order to alleviate the growing egg-yolk problem of Angeles, caused by the construction of the then-town's big church which used millions of egg whites to mix with lime powder to make mortar; this left a surplus of egg yolks. The egg yolks that were unused were buried in a barangay in Mexico, Pampanga now called Masangsang, which name literally refers to the smell from the rotting yolks.

The locals, so the story goes, began to make their cookies even more intricate than the Spaniards’, using their own custom wooden molds. The Kapampangans supposedly came up with a "middle up, middle down" method of rolling dough into a mold, which allowed for more detailed designs that could include a symbol referencing the family that made the mold.

The furnace-baked buttery cookies are believed to have healing powers.

== Recognition ==
In 2012, Atching Lillian was given the Most Outstanding Kapampangan Award in the Culture category by the provincial government of Pampanga, conferring on her the title "Guardian of the Kapampangan Kitchen".

In 2019, Yummy.ph reported that Holy Angel University also bestowed on Atching Lillian the title "Guardian Angel of Kapampangan Cooking", while the website itself used the designation "Gatekeeper to Kapampangan Cuisine".

Also in 2019, Vikings, the all-you-can-eat restaurant, hired Atching Lillian as its consultant for the restaurant's Kapampangan food section.

== Books ==
- Atching Lillian's Heirloom Recipes: Romancing the Past through Traditional Calutung Capampangan (Center for Kapampangan Studies, Holy Angel University, 2014)
