= Pampanga =

Province in Central Luzon, Philippines

- Province
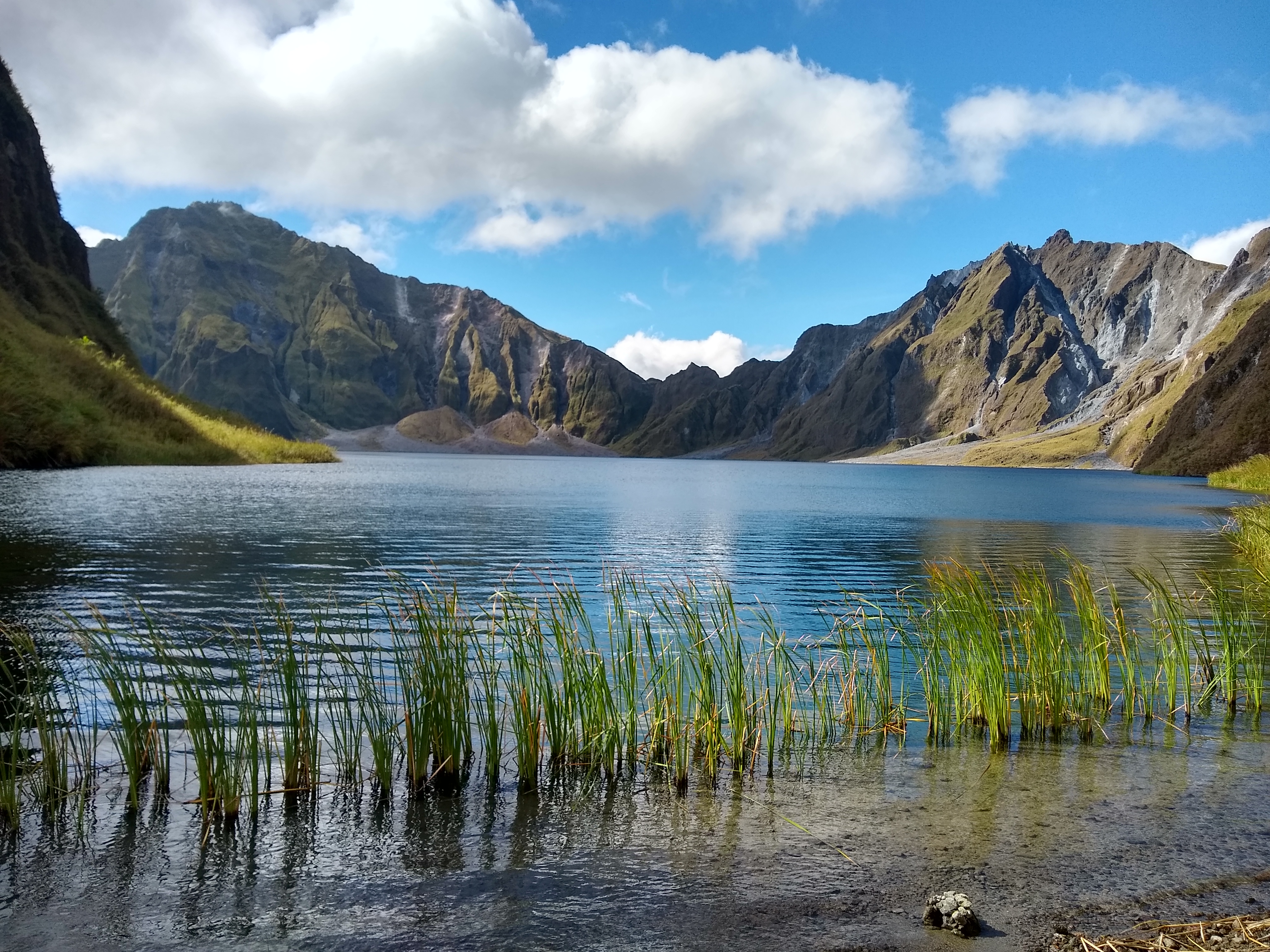
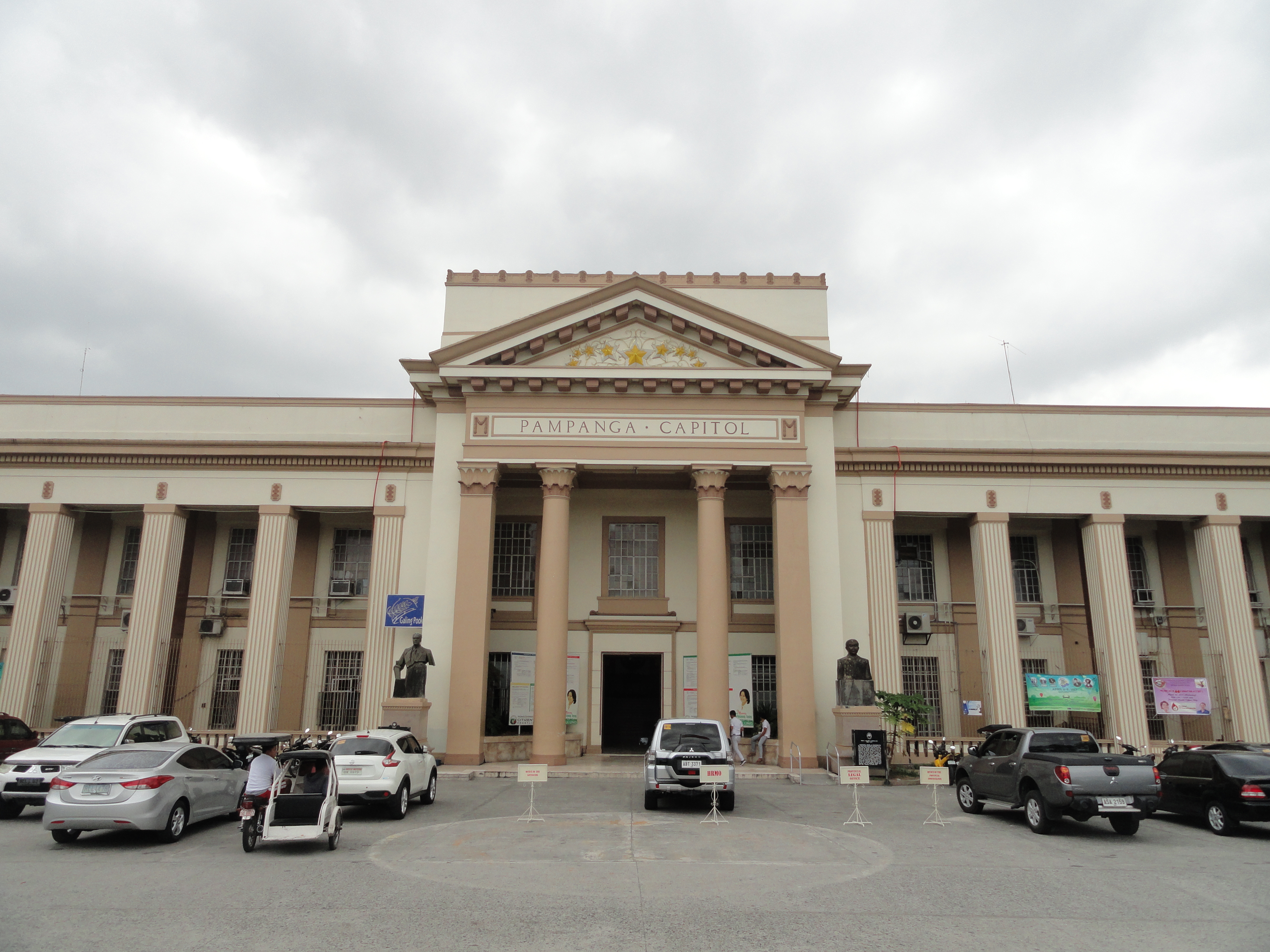
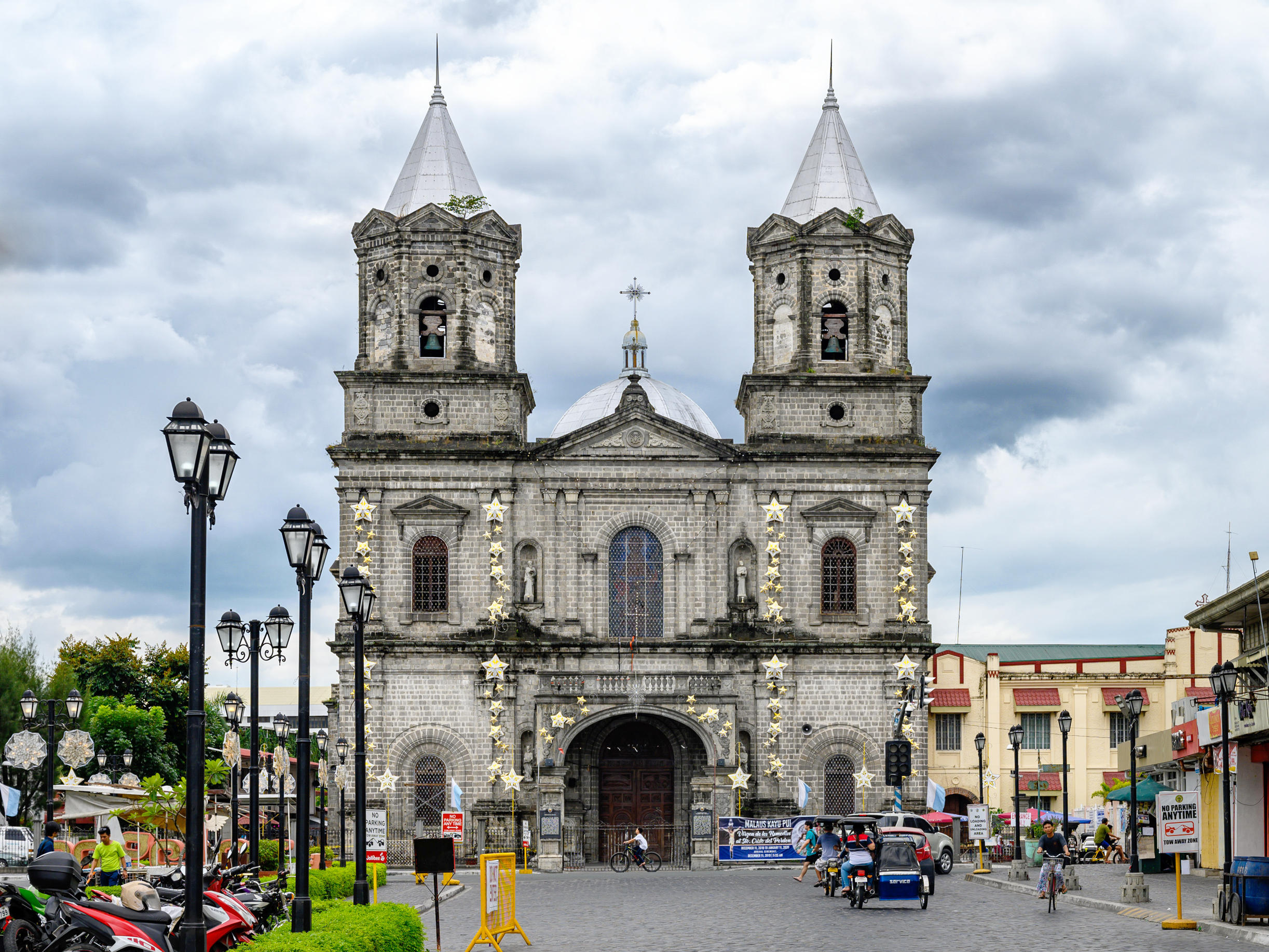
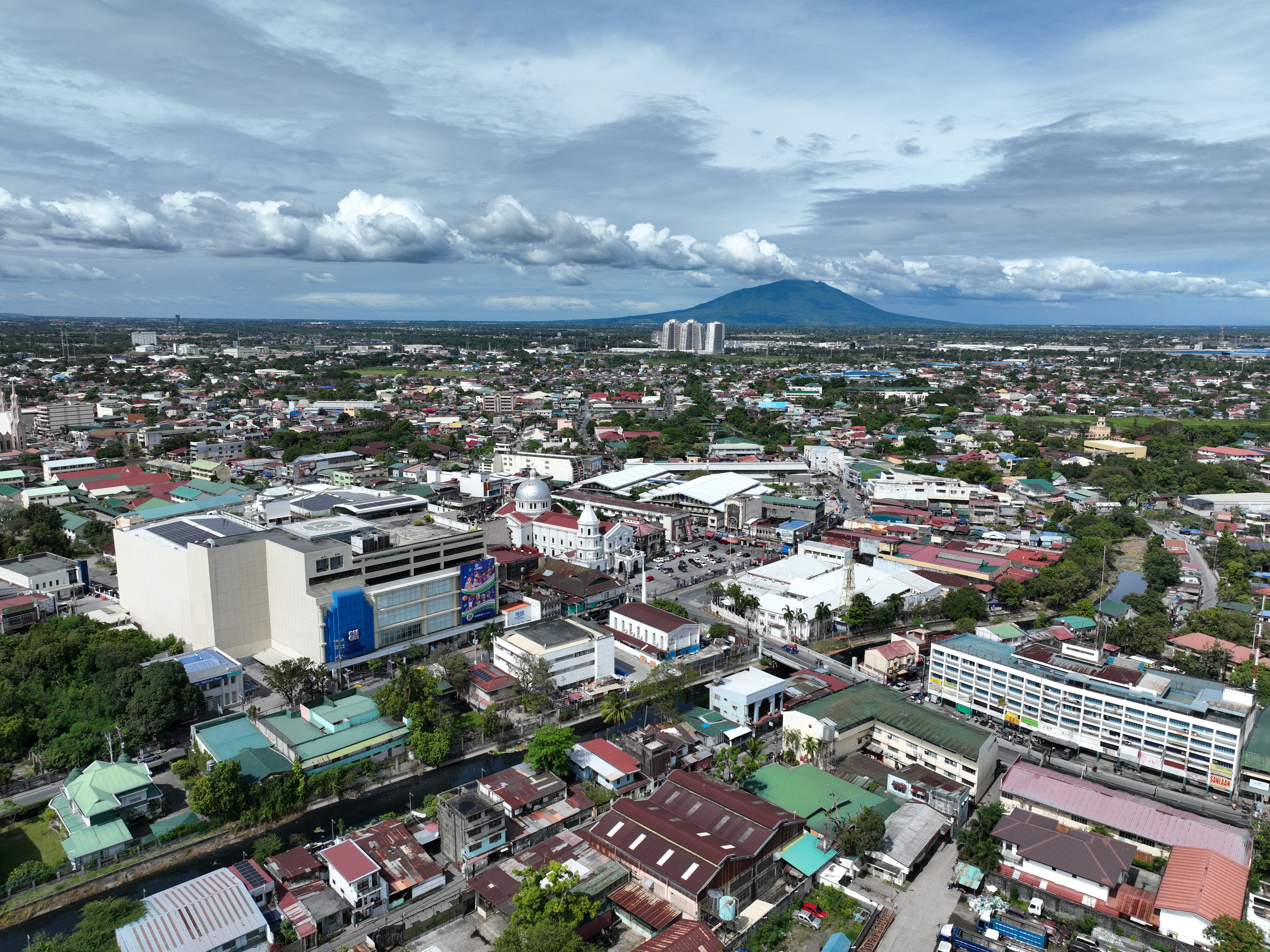
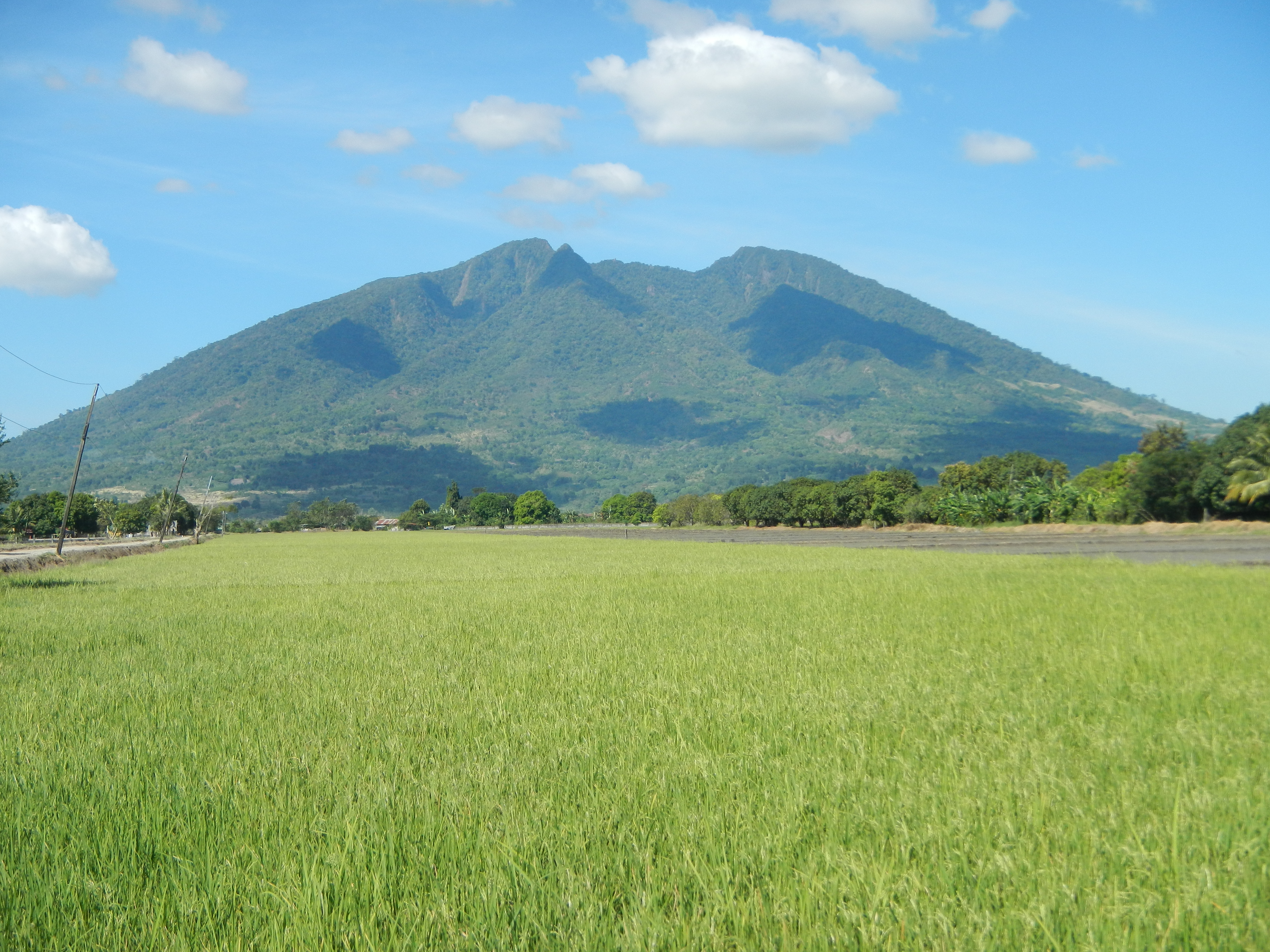
- (from top: left to right) Mount Pinatubo crater, Pampanga Provincial Capitol, Holy Rosary Parish in Angeles, Downtown San Fernando, Mount Arayat and Clark International Airport

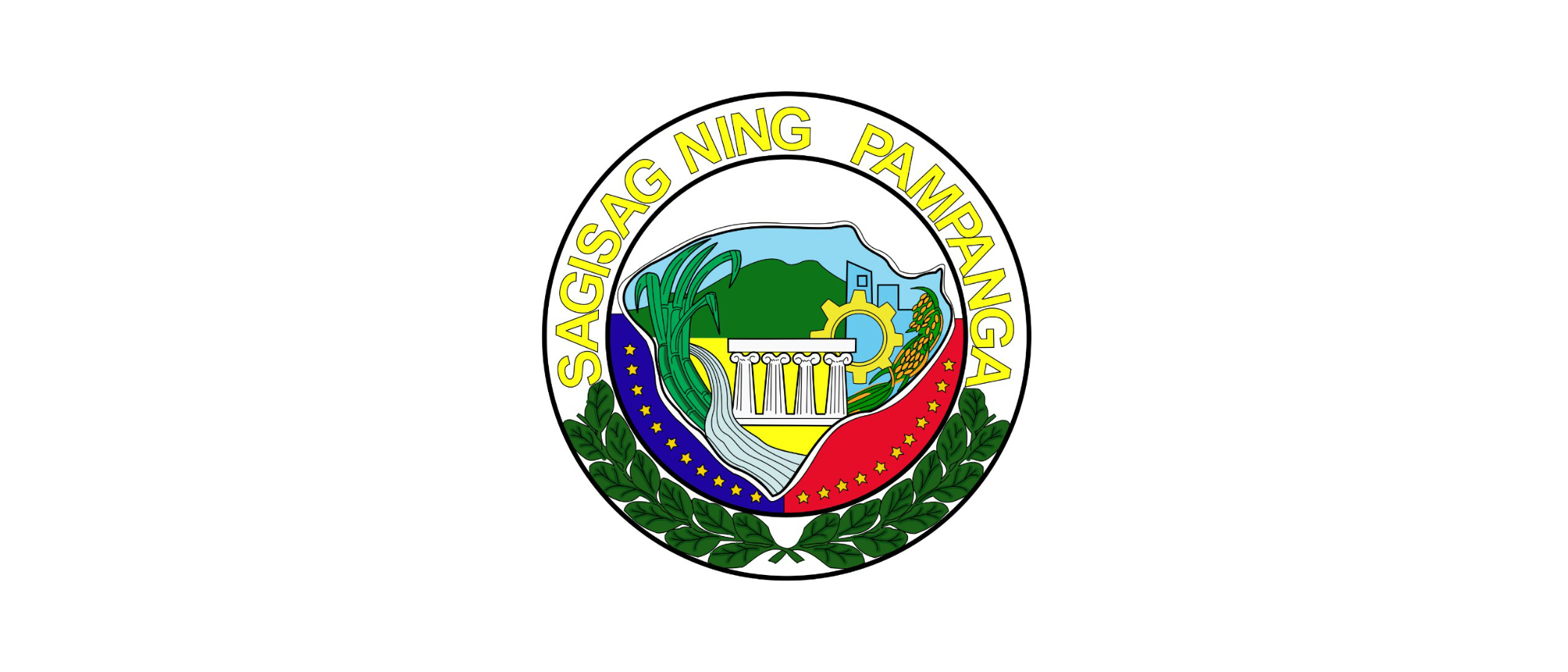
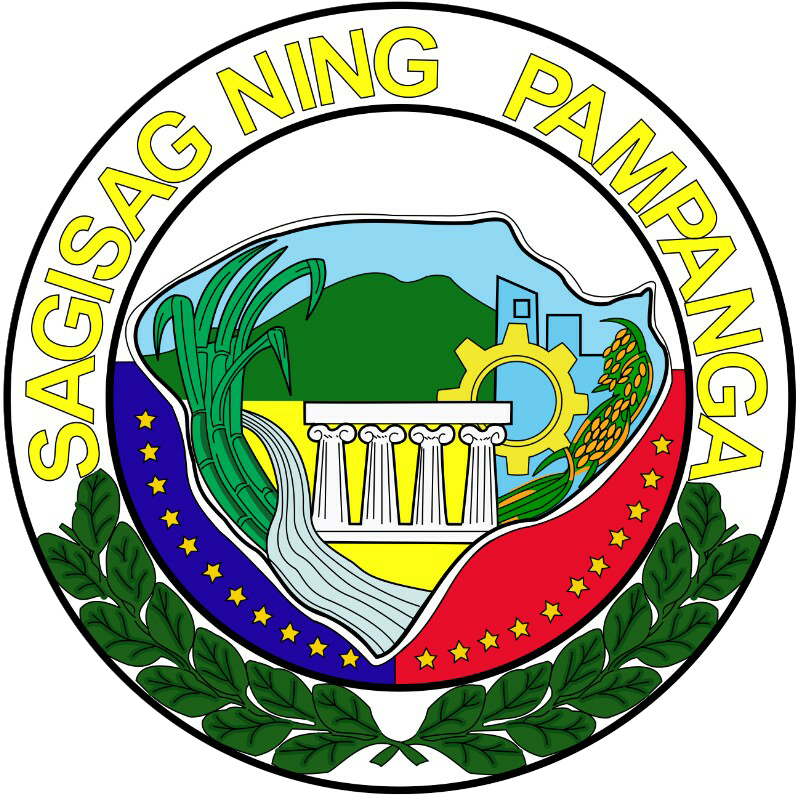
- Flag Seal
- Nickname: Christmas Capital of the Philippines
- Anthem: Imno ning Kapampangan (Kapampangan) (English: "Pampanga Hymn") Mekeni Tuki Ka, Malaus ka Pampanga (traditional and former anthem)
- Location in the Philippines
- Interactive map of Pampanga
- Coordinates: 15°04′N 120°40′E
- Country: Philippines
- Region: Central Luzon
- Founded: December 11, 1571
- Capital: San Fernando
- Largest city: Angeles City*

Government
  - Type: Sangguniang Panlalawigan
  - Governor: Lilia G. Pineda (Kambilan)
  - Vice Governor: Dennis G. Pineda (NPC)
  - Legislature: Pampanga Provincial Board
  - Electorate: 1,674,789 voters (2025)

Area
  - Total: 2,002.20 km^{2} (773.05 sq mi)
  - Rank: 61st out of 82
- (excluding Angeles)
- Highest elevation (Mount Negron): 1,583 m (5,194 ft)

Population (2024 census)
  - Total: 2,586,446
  - Rank: 9th out of 82
  - Density: 1,291.80/km^{2} (3,345.75/sq mi)
  - Rank: 5th out of 82
  - Households: 573,920
- (excluding Angeles)
- Demonyms: Kapampangan; Pampangueño; Pampango

Divisions
  - Independent cities: 1: Angeles City*
  - Component cities: 2: Mabalacat; San Fernando
  - Municipalities: 19: Apalit; Arayat; Bacolor; Candaba; Floridablanca; Guagua; Lubao; Macabebe; Magalang; Masantol; Mexico; Minalin; Porac; San Luis; San Simon; Santa Ana; Santa Rita; Santo Tomas; Sasmuan
  - Barangays: 505; including independent cities: 538
  - Districts: Legislative districts of Pampanga (shared with Angeles City)

Economy
  - Income class: 1st provincial income class
  - Poverty incidence: 1% (2023)
  - Revenue: ₱ 6,527 million (2024)
  - Assets: ₱ 21,194 million (2024)
  - Expenditure: ₱ 5,924 million (2024)
  - Liabilities: ₱ 4,580 million (2024)
- Time zone: UTC+8 (PST)
- PSGC: 035400000
- IDD : area code: +63 (0)45
- ISO 3166 code: PH-PAM
- Ethnic groups: Kapampangan (84%); Tagalog (14%); Sambal (2%)
- Spoken languages: Kapampangan; Tagalog; Filipino; English
- Website: www.pampanga.gov.ph
- * Angeles City is a highly-urbanized city, politically independent from Pampanga.

Pampanga, officially the Province of Pampanga (Kapampangan: Lalawigan ning Pampanga; Tagalog: Lalawigan ng Pampanga), is a province in Central Luzon, Philippines. Lying on the northern shore of Manila Bay, Pampanga is bordered by Tarlac to the north, Nueva Ecija to the northeast, Bulacan to the east, Manila Bay to the south, Bataan to the southwest, and Zambales to the west. Its capital is San Fernando, the regional center of Central Luzon. Angeles City is the largest city in Pampanga but is administratively independent. It has been self-governing since receiving its charter in 1964.

The name La Pampanga was given by the Spaniards, who found natives living along the banks (pampáng) of the Pampanga River. It was created in 1571 as the first Spanish province on Luzon (the province of Cebu in the Visayas is older, founded in 1565). The town of Villa de Bacolor briefly served as the Spanish colonial capital when Great Britain occupied Manila during the Seven Years' War. On the eve of the Philippine Revolution in 1896, Pampanga was one of eight provinces placed under martial law for rebelling against the Spanish Empire. It is represented on the Flag of the Philippines by one of the eight rays of the sun.

Pampanga is served by Clark International Airport (formerly Diosdado Macapagal International Airport), which is in Clark Freeport Zone, some 16 kilometers (9.9 mi) north of the provincial capital. The province is home to two Philippine Air Force airbases: Basa Air Base in Floridablanca and the former United States Clark Air Base in Angeles. Due to its growing population and developments, the Clark Global City is now being developed and is located in Clark Freeport Zone. In 2015, the province had 2,198,110 inhabitants, while it had 1,079,532 registered voters.

== History ==
=== Spanish colonial era ===
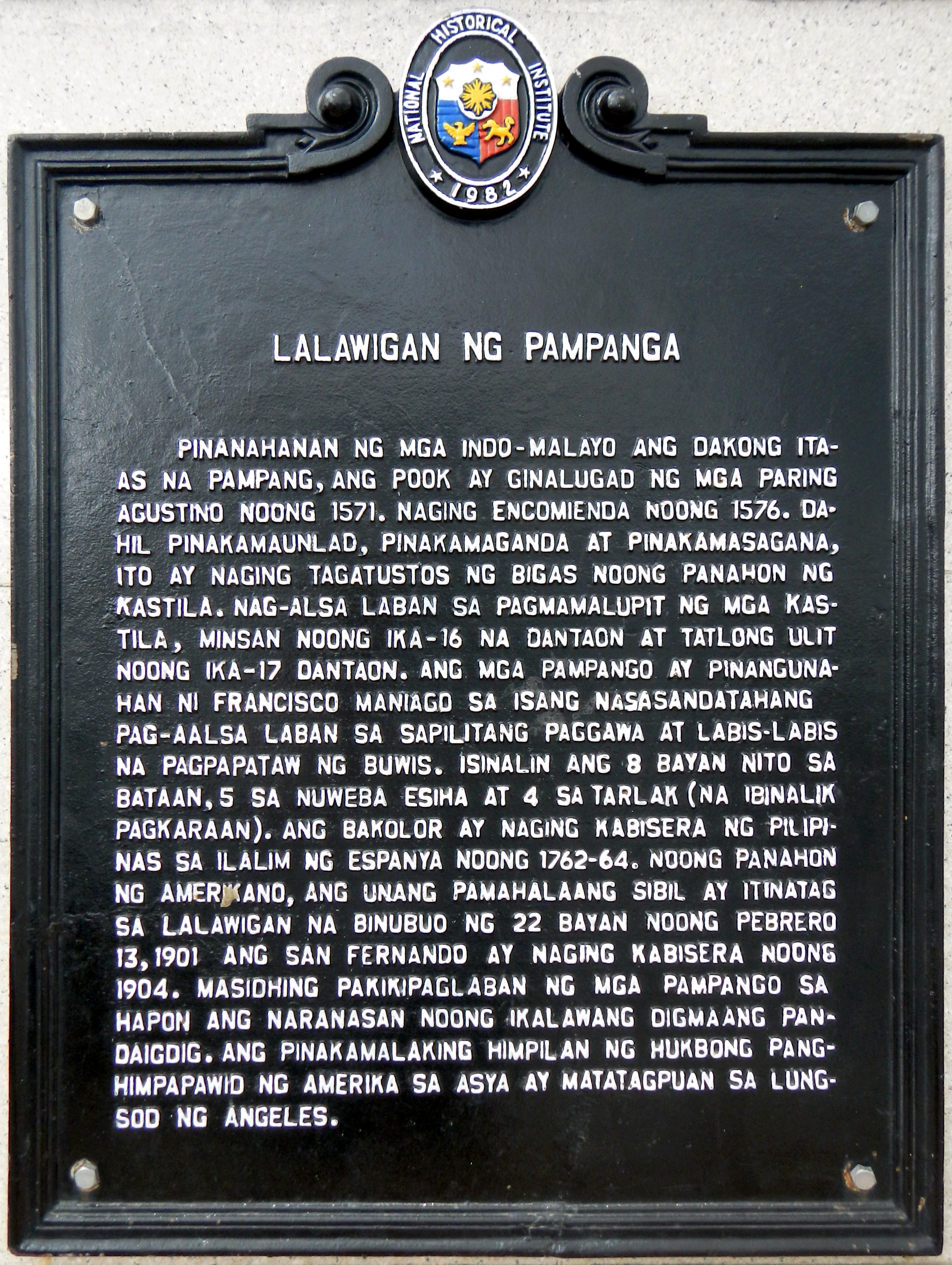
Historical marker created by the National Historical Institute in 1982 to commemorate the province and installed at the provincial capitol

The precolonial Kingdom of Tondo had Kapampangan speaking peoples at their core. And that kingdom traded with people as far as Cambodia and India. The territorial area of old Pampanga included portions of the modern provinces of Tarlac, Bataan, Zambales, Nueva Ecija, Bulacan and Aurora; i.e. covered almost the entire Central Luzon. When the Spanish arrived at Luzon, they found Pampanga to be thickly populated with several towns and that there were 3 castles or forts protecting Pampanga. Pampanga was re-organized as a province by the Spaniards on December 11, 1571. La Provincia de La Pampanga included areas mentioned above except Tondo, along with modern provinces of Aurora and parts of Quezon (including Polillo Islands) and Rizal (Pampanga also included portions of Metro Manila, which are Novaliches and Valenzuela to be exact, which was formerly known as Polo, then towns in Bulacan). For better administration and taxation purposes, the Spanish authorities subdivided Pampanga into pueblos, which were further subdivided into districts (barrios) and in some cases into royal and private estates (encomiendas).

Due to excessive abuses committed by some encomenderos, King Philip II of Spain in 1574 prohibited the further awarding of private estates, but this decree was not fully enforced until 1620. In a report of Philippine encomiendas on June 20, 1591, Governor-General Gómez Pérez Dasmariñas reported to the Crown that La Pampanga's encomiendas were Bataan, Betis y Lubao, Macabebe, Candaba, Apalit, Calumpit, Malolos, Binto, Guiguinto, Caluya, Bulacan and Mecabayan. The encomiendas of La Pampanga at that time had eighteen thousand six hundred and eighty whole tributes.

Pampanga, which is about 850 square miles (2,200 km^{2}) in area and inhabited by more than 1.5 million people, had its present borders drawn in 1873. During the Spanish regime, it was one of the richest Philippine provinces. Manila and its surrounding region were then primarily dependent on Kapampangan agricultural, fishery and forestry products as well as on the supply of skilled workers. As other Luzon provinces were created due to increases in population, some well-established Pampanga towns were lost to new emerging provinces in Central Luzon.

During the 17th century, the Dutch recruited men from Pampanga as mercenaries who served the Royal Netherlands East Indies Army, known as Papangers part of the larger Mardijkers community. Their legacy can be found in North Jakarta; however, there are few traces of their descendants, except for a small community in Kampung Tugu.

The historic province of Bataan which was founded in 1754 under the administration of Spanish Governor-General Pedro Manuel Arandia, absorbed from the province of Pampanga the municipalities of Abucay, Balanga (now a city), Dinalupihan, Llana Hermosa, Orani, Orion, Pilar, and Samal. During the British occupation of Manila (1762–1764), Bacolor became the provisional Spanish colonial capital and military base. By the end of the 1700s, Pampanga had 16,604 native families and 2,641 Spanish Filipino families, and 870 Chinese Filipino families. In Rafael Bernal's book: Mexico En Filipinas, Pampanga was listed among other places which include Cavite and Masbate, as areas where there were large concentrations of Mexican immigrants to the Philippines.

The old Pampanga towns of Aliaga, Cabiao, Gapan, San Antonio and San Isidro were ceded to the province of Nueva Ecija in 1848 during the term of Spanish Governor-General Narciso Claveria y Zaldua. The municipality of San Miguel de Mayumo of Pampanga was yielded to the province of Bulacan in the same provincial boundary configuration in 1848.

In 1860, the northern towns of Bamban, Capas, Concepcion, Victoria, Tarlac, Mabalacat, Magalang, Porac and Floridablanca were separated from Pampanga and were placed under the jurisdiction of a military command called Comandancia Militar de Tarlac. However, in 1873, the four latter towns were returned to Pampanga and the other five became municipalities of the newly created province of Tarlac.

=== Japanese invasion ===
==== Attack on Clark Field ====
On December 8, 1941, Japanese planes bombed Clark Field in what has come to be known as the Attack on Clark Field, marking the beginning of the invasion of Pampanga.

In keeping with War Plan Orange-3, Douglas McArthur ordered the evacuation of Fort Stotsenburg on December 24, 1941, and what could not be evacuated of the fort's stocks of high octane fuel, food, and clothing were destroyed.

Between 1941 and 1942, occupying Japanese forces began entering Pampanga.

==== The Japanese occupation ====
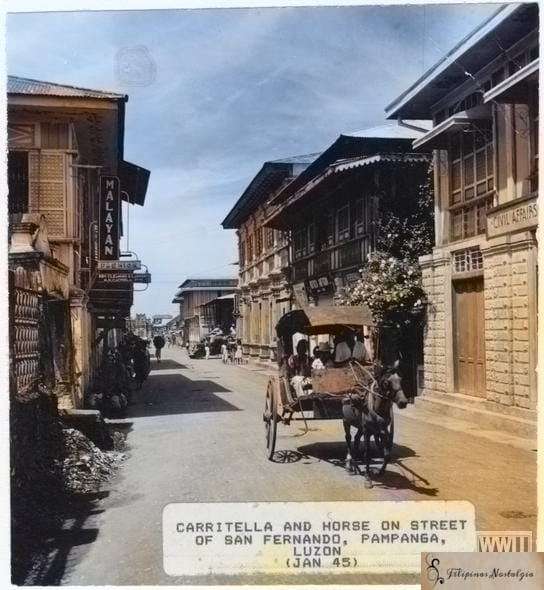
Old street, San Fernando, Pampanga, Philippines

The establishment of the military general headquarters and military camp bases of the Philippine Commonwealth Army was active from 1935 to 1946. The Philippine Constabulary was active from 1935 to 1942 and 1944 to 1946 in the province of Pampanga. During the military engagements of the anti-Japanese Imperial military operations in central Luzon from 1942 to 1945 in the province of Bataan, Bulacan, Northern Tayabas (now Aurora), Nueva Ecija, Pampanga, Tarlac, and Zambales, the local guerrilla resistance fighters and Hukbalahap Communist guerrillas, helped the U.S. military forces fight the Imperial Japanese armed forces.

==== The Liberation of Pampanga ====
In the 1945 liberation of Pampanga, Kapampangan guerrilla fighters and the Hukbalahap Communist guerrillas supported combat forces from Filipino and American ground troops in attacking Japanese Imperial forces during the Battle of Pampanga until the end of the Second World War. Local military operations soldiers and officers of the Philippine Commonwealth Army 2nd, 26th, 3rd, 32nd, 33rd, 35th, 36th and 37th Infantry Division and the Philippine Constabulary 3rd Constabulary Regiment recaptured and liberated the province of Pampanga and fought against the Japanese Imperial forces during the Battle of Pampanga.

=== Post-war era ===
After the Second World War, operations in the main province of Pampanga was downfall insurgencies and conflicts between the Philippine Government forces and the Hukbalahap Communist rebels on 1946 to 1954 during the Hukbalahap Rebellion.

Under a 1947 Military Bases Agreement, the Philippines granted the United States a 99-year lease on several U.S. bases, including Clark Air Base. A later amendment in 1966 reduced the original 99-year term of the agreement to 25 years. A renewal of the agreement in 1979 allowed the U.S. to continue operating Clark Air Base until November 1991, when the Philippine Senate rejected a bill for the renewal of U.S. bases in the Philippines.

=== Martial law era ===
==== Clark Air Base controversies ====
Due to its proximity to the capital and the presence of Clark Air Base, Pampanga was became one of the flashpoint of social upheavals of the early 1970s, and the ensuing dictatorship of Ferdinand Marcos. Even during the first demonstrations of the First Quarter Storm in 1970, Clark and the other US Bases in the Philippines were a major issue for protesters, who saw them as a continuation of the US' colonial hegemony, and a way of dragging the Philippines into the cold war, since Clark had become a staging point for the increasingly unpopular Vietnam War.

1970 saw a major diplomatic incident at Clark Air Base in what US Presidential Assistant for National Security Affairs Henry Kissinger eventually called "the Williams Case." In June 1970, Angeles City Court of First Instance Ceferino Gaddi ordered the arrest of Base Commander Colonel Averill Holman and Base Chief of International Law Lt. Col. Raymond Hodges, citing in contempt for allowing the transfer of US Air Force Staff Sergeant Bernard Willams to the US in November 1969 despite the fact that he had been arraigned in the Angeles Court in August 1969 on criminal charges of abduction and attempted rape. Williams was eventually returned to the Philippines, although the Marcos administration refused to enforce the court ordered arrests against Holman and Hodges. The incident helped the push for the renegotiation of the US-Philippines Bases Treaty in 1979, in an effort to clarify the issue of Philippine sovereignty and jurisdiction over the bases.

In 1971, unfair labor practices led the civilian workers at the base to stage a three-day strike which began on March 3, followed by a half-month strike which began on July 25. The Federation of Filipino Civilian Employees Associations would organize further major strikes in 1979, 1983, and in March 1986.

==== Implementation of martial law ====
Upon the declaration of martial law in September 1972, Camp Olivas in the City of San Fernando was designated as one of the four provincial camps to become a Regional Command for Detainees (RECAD). It was designated RECAD I and it housed detainees from Northern and Central Luzon. Prominent detainees imprisoned there include Edicio de la Torre, Judy Taguiwalo, Tina Pargas, Marie Hilao-Enriquez, and Bernard-Adan Ebuen. Prisoners who were documented to have been tortured include the sisters Joanna and Josefina Cariño, the brothers Romulo and Armando Palabay, and Mariano Giner Jr of Abra. About 50 Kalinga and Bontoc leaders, including Butbut tribe leader Macli-ing Dulag, were also brought to Camp Olivas from their detainment center in Tabuk, Kalinga, arrested for their opposition to the Chico River Dam Project. Seminarian Teresito Sison had campaigned for the rights of teachers, farmers, and of laborers in Clark Air Base, but torture during two stints in Marcos' detention centers caused a decline in his health which led to his death in 1980.

Others were killed without being arrested, such as close friends Pepito Deheran, Rolando Castro and Lito Cabrera were sleeping in Cabrera's property in Sapang Bato, Angeles when they were attacked, captured, and tortured by Marcos' Civilian Home Defense Force militia forces after they participated in the protest movement that grew out of the assassination of opposition leader Ninoy Aquino. Deheran managed to escape the ordeal alive and was taken to the hospital, but was stabbed by unknown assailants in his own hospital bed.

Jennifer Cariño, the Palabay brothers, Macli-ing Dulag, Castro, Cabrera, and Deheran would later be honored by having their names inscribed on the wall of remembrance of the Philippines' Bantayog ng mga Bayani, which honors the martyrs and heroes who dared to resist the dictatorship.

==== 1980 Assassination of Congressman Lingad ====
Jose B. Lingad, congressman for Pampanga's 1st congressional district, had been one of the first to be detained upon the declaration of martial law, but was released after three months. He retired to his farm after that, but was later convinced by Benigno Aquino Jr. to run for the governorship of Pampanga in the January 1980 Philippine local elections. Lingad lost the election to the Marcos administration's candidate, but filed a protest, which was still ongoing when Lingad was assassinated in December 1980 at a gasoline station in barangay San Agustin, San Fernando, Pampanga. His assassin, a former sergeant in the Philippine Constabulary, was himself killed in a mysterious car accident before he could reveal who had ordered the killing.

=== During the People Power revolution ===
==== The Bamban Barricade ====
Central Luzon played an important role during the People Power revolution because of its proximity to the Capital and its hosting of various Philippine and US Armed Force Bases. In a notable incident in Pampanga, 20,000 people blocked the Bamban Bridge which connects Bamban, Tarlac to Mabalacat, Pampanga on Feb. 25 to prevent loyalist forces from the Army's 5th Infantry Division in Tarlac from getting through to Manila, in an event which came to be known as "the Bamban barricade."

==== The flight of the Marcoses ====
Clark Air Base also played a key part in the ousting of the Marcoses, since they were flown to Clark after fleeing Malacañang and it was there that they boarded the U.S. provided plane that flew them into exile in Hawaii.

=== Mount Pinatubo eruption and closure of Clark Air Base ===
Major events that took place in Pampanga after the People Power revolution include the Mount Pinatubo eruption and the end of the Philippines' Bases Treaty with the United States, which resulted in the closure of Clark Air Base and the later creation of the Clark Freeport and Special Economic Zone.

The June 15, 1991, eruption of Mount Pinatubo displaced a large number of people with the submersion of whole towns and villages by massive lahar floods. This led to a large-scale advancement in disaster preparation in government. It also hastened the closure of Clark Air Base, which would close as a result of the November 1991 decision of the Philippine senate not to renew the Philippines' Bases treaty with the United States.

=== Creation of the Clark Freeport and Special Economic Zone ===
1992 saw the signing of the Bases Conversion and Development Act (Republic Act 7227 ser. 1992), which authorized the President to issue a decree converting the military reservation in the Clark area covering Angeles City, Mabalacat, and Porac, Pampanga and Capas, Tarlac into a special economic zone. The legislation also created the Bases Conversion and Development Authority (BCDA) to facilitate the conversion process. President Fidel Ramos issued Proclamation No. 163 on April 3, 1993, creating the Clark Special Economic Zone (CSEZ) and transferring the administration of the area to the BCDA. The proclamation included the Clark Air Base and portions of the Clark reverted baselands not reserved for military use to the CSEZ. On June 14, 1996, the CSEZ was expanded with the addition of the Sacobia area, which includes lands from Mabalacat, Pampanga and Bamban, Tarlac, through Ramos' Proclamation No. 805.

The Clark Air Base area would later be declared a Freeport Zone and was separated from the special economic zone through Republic Act 9400 of 2007 Since then the Freeport Zone and the Clark Special Economic Zone were considered as separate areas but collectively they are referred to as the "Clark Freeport and Special Economic Zone".

=== Contemporary ===
In 2010, a Kapampangan, Benigno Aquino III, son of former President Corazon Aquino, was elected as president.

On April 22, 2019, the province suffered severe damage due to 6.1 magnitude earthquake which originated from Zambales and was the most affected area by the earthquake due to the province sitting on soft sediment and alluvial soil. Several structures in the province were damaged by the quake, including a 4-story supermarket in Porac, the Bataan-Pampanga boundary arch and the main terminal of Clark International Airport, as well as old churches in Lubao and Porac, where the stone bell tower of the 19th-century Santa Catalina de Alejandria Church collapsed.

== Geography ==
Pampanga covers a total area of 2,002.20 square kilometers (773.05 sq mi) occupying the south-central section of the Central Luzon region. When Angeles is included for geographical purposes, the province's area is 2,062.47 square kilometers (796.32 sq mi). The province is bordered by Tarlac to the north, Nueva Ecija to the northeast, Bulacan to the east, Manila Bay to the central-south, Bataan to the southwest, and Zambales to the northwest.

Its terrain is relatively flat with one distinct mountain, Mount Arayat and the notable Pampanga River. Among its municipalities, Porac has the largest area with 314 square kilometers (121 sq mi); Candaba comes in second with 176 square kilometers (68 sq mi); followed by Floridablanca with 175 square kilometers (68 sq mi). Santo Tomas, with an area of only 21 square kilometers (8.1 sq mi), is the smallest.

=== Climate ===
The province of Pampanga has two distinct climates, rainy and dry. The rainy or wet season normally begins in May and runs through October, while the rest of the year is the dry season. The warmest period of the year occurs between March and April, while the coolest period is from December through February. The wet season will be from June to October and also the dry season will be from November to April in the province of Pampanga.

Climate data for Pampanga
Month	Jan	Feb	Mar	Apr	May	Jun	Jul	Aug	Sep	Oct	Nov	Dec	Year
Mean daily maximum °C (°F)	30.5 (86.9)	31.5 (88.7)	33.1 (91.6)	34.5 (94.1)	34.0 (93.2)	32.6 (90.7)	32.0 (89.6)	31.2 (88.2)	31.4 (88.5)	31.6 (88.9)	31.4 (88.5)	30.5 (86.9)	32.0 (89.7)
Mean daily minimum °C (°F)	21.6 (70.9)	21.8 (71.2)	22.9 (73.2)	24.1 (75.4)	25.0 (77.0)	25.0 (77.0)	24.6 (76.3)	24.8 (76.6)	24.3 (75.7)	24.0 (75.2)	23.5 (74.3)	22.3 (72.1)	23.7 (74.6)
Average rainy days	5	3	4	5	13	20	22	22	22	17	15	8	156
Source: Storm247

=== Administrative divisions ===
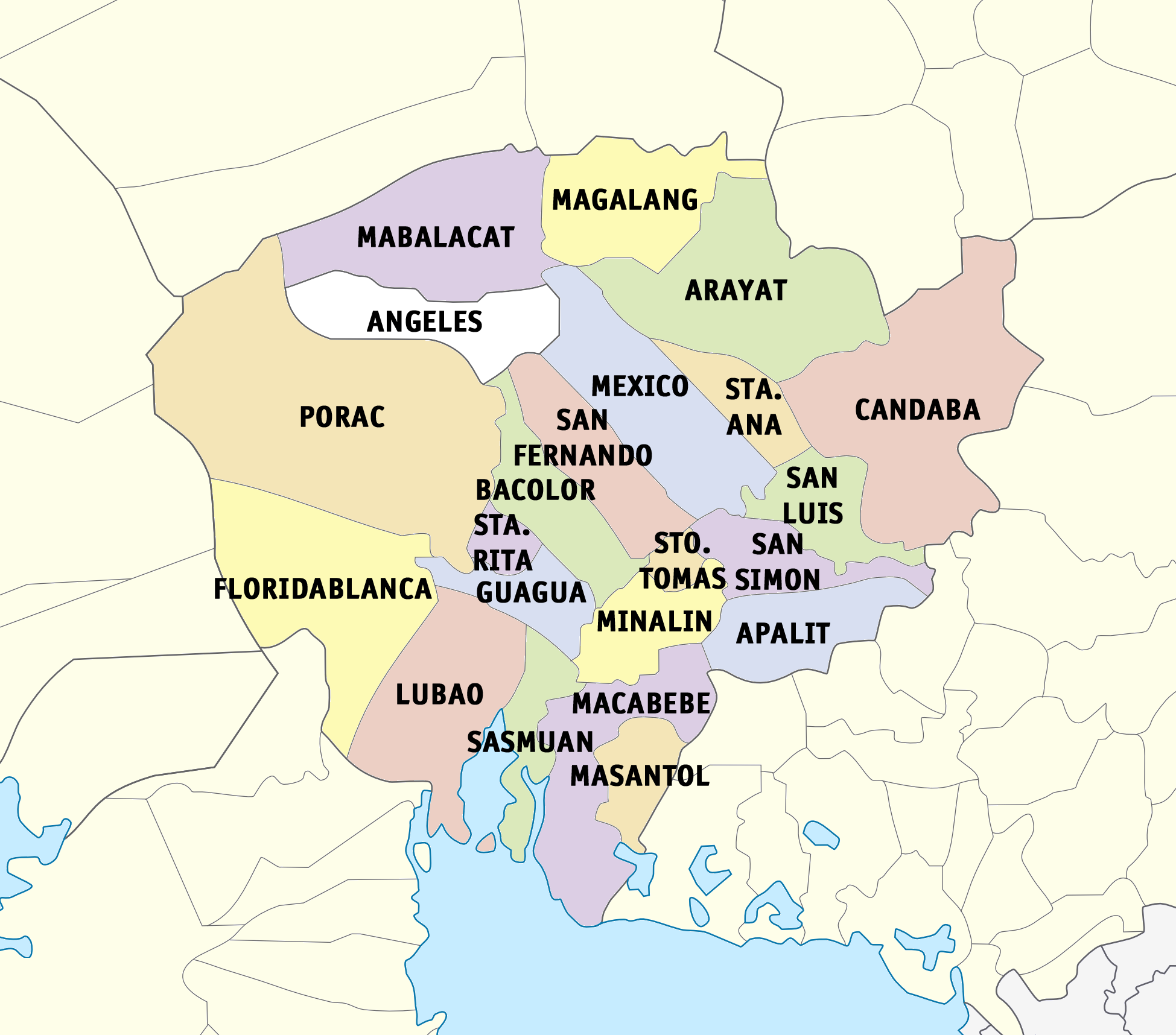
Political map of Pampanga

Pampanga comprises 19 municipalities and three cities (one highly urbanized and two component).

The province is divided into three parts. The western portion includes the municipalities of Porac and Floridablanca, the component city of Mabalacat, and the highly urbanized city of Angeles. The central part consists of the municipalities of Magalang, Arayat, Mexico, Santa Ana, Bacolor, Santa Rita, Guagua, Lubao, Sasmuan, and the highly urbanized city of San Fernando. The eastern half is composed of the municipalities of Candaba, San Luis, Santo Tomas, San Simon, Minalin, Apalit, Macabebe, and Masantol.

- † Provincial capital and component city
- ∗ Component city
- Municipality
- ‡ Highly urbanized city (geographically within but independent from the province)

City or municipality		District	Population			±% p.a.	Area		Density		Barangay	Coordinates^{[A]}
			(2020)		(2015)		km^{2}	sq mi	/km^{2}	/sq mi		
Angeles City	‡	1st	—	462,928	411,634	2.26%	63.37	24.47	7,300	19,000	33	15°08′24″N 120°35′16″E
Apalit		4th	4.8%	117,160	107,965	1.57%	61.47	23.73	1,900	4,900	12	14°57′01″N 120°45′36″E
Arayat		3rd	5.9%	144,875	133,492	1.57%	134.48	51.92	1,100	2,800	30	15°09′00″N 120°46′03″E
Bacolor		3rd	2.0%	48,066	39,460	3.83%	71.70	27.68	670	1,700	21	14°59′47″N 120°39′05″E
Candaba		4th	4.9%	119,497	111,586	1.31%	176.40	68.11	680	1,800	33	15°05′33″N 120°49′39″E
Floridablanca		2nd	5.6%	135,542	125,163	1.53%	175.48	67.75	770	2,000	33	14°58′33″N 120°31′43″E
Guagua		2nd	5.3%	128,893	117,430	1.79%	48.67	18.79	2,600	6,700	31	14°57′55″N 120°38′01″E
Lubao		2nd	7.1%	173,502	160,838	1.45%	155.77	60.14	1,100	2,800	44	14°56′16″N 120°36′01″E
Mabalacat	∗	1st	12.0%	293,244	250,799	3.02%	82.20	31.74	3,600	9,300	27	15°13′22″N 120°34′24″E
Macabebe		4th	3.2%	78,151	75,850	0.57%	105.16	40.60	740	1,900	25	14°54′30″N 120°42′53″E
Magalang		1st	5.1%	124,188	113,147	0.91%	97.32	37.58	1,300	3,400	27	15°12′53″N 120°39′42″E
Masantol		4th	2.4%	57,990	57,063	0.31%	48.25	18.63	1,200	3,100	26	14°53′04″N 120°42′35″E
Mexico		3rd	7.1%	173,403	154,624	2.21%	117.41	45.33	1,500	3,900	43	15°03′53″N 120°43′12″E
Minalin		4th	2.0%	48,380	47,713	0.26%	48.27	18.64	1,000	2,600	15	14°58′04″N 120°41′09″E
Porac		2nd	5.8%	140,751	124,381	2.38%	314.00	121.24	450	1,200	29	15°04′20″N 120°32′28″E
San Fernando	†	3rd	14.5%	354,666	306,659	2.81%	67.74	26.15	5,200	13,000	35	15°01′45″N 120°41′34″E
San Luis		4th	2.4%	58,551	54,106	1.51%	56.83	21.94	1,000	2,600	17	15°02′21″N 120°47′27″E
San Simon		4th	2.4%	59,182	53,198	2.05%	57.37	22.15	1,000	2,600	14	14°59′42″N 120°46′45″E
Santa Ana		3rd	2.5%	61,537	55,178	2.10%	39.84	15.38	1,500	3,900	14	15°05′41″N 120°45′57″E
Santa Rita		2nd	2.0%	48,209	40,979	3.14%	29.76	11.49	1,600	4,100	10	14°59′56″N 120°37′05″E
Santo Tomas		4th	1.8%	42,846	40,475	1.09%	21.30	8.22	2,000	5,200	7	14°59′38″N 120°42′16″E
Sasmuan		2nd	1.2%	29,076	28,004	0.72%	91.80	35.44	320	830	12	14°56′10″N 120°37′21″E
Total^{[B]}				2,437,709	2,198,110	1.99%	2,001.22	772.68	1,200	3,100	505	(see GeoGroup box)
1. Coordinates mark the city/town center, and are sortable by latitude.; 2. Total figures exclude the highly urbanized city of Angeles.

== Demographics ==
=== Population ===
The population of Pampanga in the 2024 census was 2,586,446 people, with a density of 1,300 inhabitants per square kilometer or 3,400 inhabitants per square mile. If Angeles is included for geographical purposes, the population is 2,900,637, with a density of 1,406/km^{2} (3,643/sq mi). The native inhabitants of Pampanga are generally referred to as the Kapampangans (alternatively Pampangos or Pampangueños). Tagalogs live in areas on the boundaries with Bulacan, Nueva Ecija, & Bataan; they are mostly descendants of settlers arrived from those provinces, w/ others from Aurora. Because of its proximity to Metro Manila from its south, people from farther provinces settled in Pampanga, resulting to minor populations of Bicolano, Ilocano, Ilonggo, Pangasinense and Visayans, mostly living in city areas.

Population census of Pampanga

Year	Pop.	±% p.a.
1903	223,754	—
1918	257,620	+0.94%
1939	375,281	+1.81%
1948	416,583	+1.17%
1960	617,259	+3.33%
1970	772,731	+2.27%

Year	Pop.	±% p.a.
1975	891,000	+2.90%
1980	992,756	+2.19%
1990	1,295,929	+2.70%
1995	1,401,756	+1.48%
2000	1,618,759	+3.13%
2007	1,911,951	+2.32%

Year	Pop.	±% p.a.
2010	2,014,019	+1.91%
2015	2,198,110	+1.68%
2020	2,437,709	+2.20%
2024	2,586,446	+1.43%

(excluding Angeles)
Source: Philippine Statistics Authority

=== Languages ===
The whole population of Pampanga speak Kapampangan, which is one of the Central Luzon languages along with the Sambalic languages. Tagalog is generally spoken in areas bordering Bulacan, Nueva Ecija, and Bataan. English and Filipino are also spoken and used as secondary languages. A language shift to Filipino has been seen in the province, this is because of proximity to the native Tagalog-speaking provinces and migration from those, and also of influence of mass media. There are a few Sambal speakers in the province, especially near the border of Zambales.

=== Religion ===
==== Catholicism ====
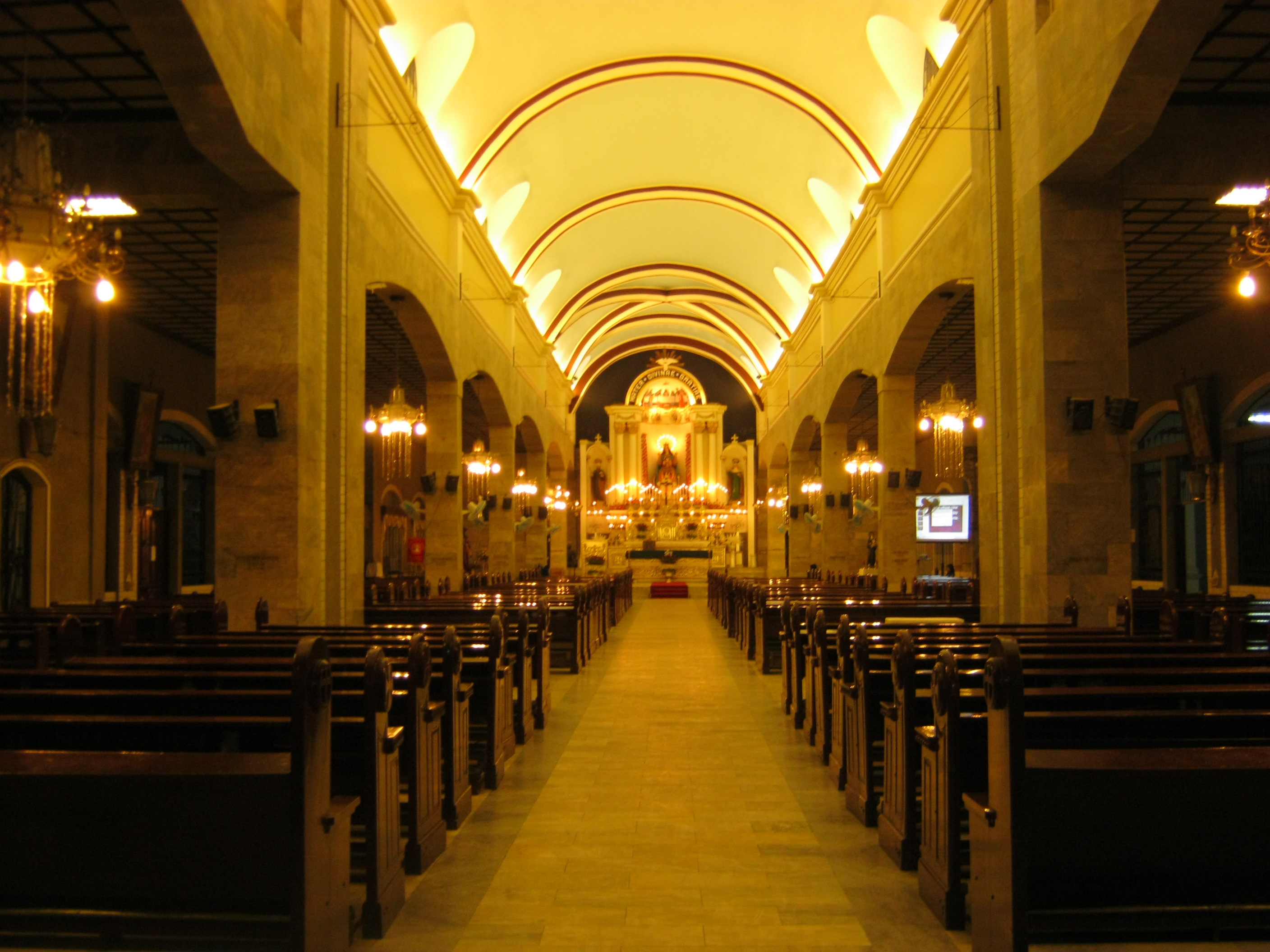
Our Lady of Grace Parish in Mabalacat

The province of Pampanga is composed of many religious groups, but it is predominantly Roman Catholic (88.92%).

==== Islam ====
Islam (0.017%) is also present in the province, mainly due to migrants originating from the south, as well as Buddhism, which is practiced by a few people of Chinese descent.

==== Iglesia Ni Cristo ====
The Iglesia ni Cristo is the largest majority religion in the province (5.14-7.5%) and the first Ecclesiastical District in the history of the Church. At the time of Bro. Eduardo V. Manalo, current Executive Minister, the province has grown in five districts with multiple locales scattered in the cities and municipalities.

==== Others ====
According to 2010 Census, other prominent Christian groups includes Evangelicals (1.34%), Aglipayan Church (0.60%), Jesus is Lord Church (0.48%), Baptist Church (0.39%), Jehovah's Witnesses (0.27%), Church of Christ (0.23%), United Church of Christ in the Philippines (0.22%), Seventh-day Adventist Church (0.18%) and many others.

== Economy ==
Poverty incidence of Pampanga (%)

Source: Philippine Statistics Authority

Farming and fishing are the two main industries. Major products include rice, corn, sugarcane, and tilapia. Pampanga is the tilapia capital of the country because of its high production reaching 214,210.12 metric tons in 2015. In addition to farming and fishing, the province supports thriving cottage industries that specialize in wood carving, furniture making, guitars and handicrafts. Every Christmas season, the province of Pampanga, especially in the capital city of San Fernando becomes the center of a thriving industry centered on handcrafted lighted lanterns called parols that display a kaleidoscope of light and color. Other industries include the casket industry and the manufacturing of all-purpose vehicles in the municipality of Santo Tomas.

The province is famous for its sophisticated culinary work: it is called the "food capital" of the Philippines.

In December 2024, the Senate declared Pampanga as the country's culinary capital. The Senate approved the Third Reading Senate Bill 2797, authored by Senators Mark Villar, Loren Legarda and Lito Lapid. Its counterpart, authored by Representatives Gloria Macapagal Arroyo and Aurelio Gonzales Jr. had also been approved by the House of Representatives.

Kapampangans are well known for their culinary creations. Famous food products range from the mundane to the exotic. Roel's Meat Products, Pampanga's Best and Mekeni Food are among the better known meat brands of the country producing Kapampangan favorites such as pork and chicken tocinos, beef tapa, hotdogs, longganizas (Philippine-style cured sausages) and chorizos.

Specialty foods such as the siopao, pandesal, tutong, lechon (roasted pig) and its sarsa (sauce) are popular specialty foods in the region. The more exotic betute tugak (stuffed frog), kamaru (mole crickets) cooked adobo, bulanglang (pork cooked in guava juice), lechon kawali and bringhe (a green sticky rice dish like paella) are a mainstay in Kapampangan feasts.

Native sweets and delicacies like pastillas, turonnes de casuy, buro, are the most sought after by Filipinos including a growing number of tourists who enjoy authentic Kapampangan cuisine. The famous cookie in Mexico, Pampanga, Panecillos de San Nicolas, which is known as the mother of all Philippine cookies, is made here, famously made by Lillian Borromeo at her restaurant, Kusinang Matua. The cookies are made with arrowroot, sugar, coconut milk and butter and are blessed in Catholic parishes every year on the feast of San Nicolas Tolentino. The cookies are believed to have a healing power and bestow good luck and are sometimes crumbled then thrown into rice fields before planting.

Tourism is a growing industry in the province of Pampanga. Clark Freeport Zone is home to Clark International Airport, designated as the Philippines' future premier gateway. Other developing industries include semiconductor manufacturing for electronics and computers mostly located within the freeport.

Within the Clark Special Economic Zone are well-established hotels and resorts. Popular tourist destinations include St. Peter Shrine in Apalit, Mt. Arayat National Park in San Juan Bano, Mount Arayat, the Paskuhan Village in the City of San Fernando, the Casino Filipino in Angeles and, for nature and wildlife, "Paradise Ranch and Zoocobia Fun Zoo" in Clark. Well-known annual events include the Giant Lantern Festival in December, the hot air balloon festival in Clarkfield in February and in Lubao in April, the San Pedro Cutud Lenten Rites celebrated two days before Easter, and the Aguman Sanduk in Minalin celebrated on the afternoon of New Year's Day.

Renewable energy initiatives in Pampanga include rooftop and utility-scale solar projects. In the City of San Fernando, the Bureau of Internal Revenue's Revenue Region 4 complex, inaugurated in March 2018, incorporates a rooftop solar photovoltaic system of about 400 kW as part of its “green building” features. In May 2025, listed developer Raslag Corp. signed a 10-year power supply agreement to deliver 15 MW to Pampanga I Electric Cooperative (PELCO I), sourced from its Raslag-4 plant in Magalang. In February 2025, the Board of Investments granted a green lane endorsement to Sapang Balen Solar Sustainable Energy Corp., a Tigon Power unit, for a proposed ground-mounted project spanning Mabalacat and Magalang with a planned installed capacity of 302 MW (DC). Additional municipal-level projects include Angeles City's program to install solar panels across city facilities and schools. In August 2024 the city began installations in public schools, and by April 2025 local reports stated that panels had been completed on all 33 barangay halls and various government buildings. In March 2025, the city inaugurated what was reported as Central Luzon's first solar-powered, fully air-conditioned public school at Belen Homesite Elementary School. The Arayat–Mexico solar farm, a 116 MW facility developed by ACEN and Citicore, began commercial operations in 2022.

== Boat culture ==
There have been proposals to revitalize the karakoa shipbuilding tradition of the Kapampangan people in recent years. The karakoa was the warship of the Kapampangan from the classical eras (before 15th century) up to the 16th century. The production of the karakoa and its usage were stopped by the Spanish colonialists to establish the galleon ship-making tradition instead, as a sign of Spanish dominance over the Kapampangan.

== Wildlife ==
Pampanga's geography has made the province an important rallying point for biodiversity conservation, particularly in the case of the Candaba Wetlands, which provides critical habitat for migratory bird species which visit the Philippines from sites further north in Asia. Migratory birds frequently seen in the swamp include the Shrenck's bittern, the great bittern, the Eurasian spoonbill, the purple swamp wen, the Chinese pond heron and the black-crowned heron.

== Infrastructure ==
=== Telecommunication ===
Telephone services are provided by PLDT, Digitel, Converge Telecom, Datelcom, the Evangelista Telephone Company, and the Pampanga Telecom Company in the town of Macabebe. The province has 24 public telegraph offices distributed among its towns while the facilities of PT&T and RCPI were set up to serve the business centers in Angeles, San Fernando City and Guagua.

Several Internet Service provider are available. These include the Angeles Computer Network Specialist, Information Resources Network System, Inc., Mosaic communications Inc., Net Asia Angeles, Phil World On Line and Comclark Network and Technology Corp.

United Parcel Service (UPS) and Federal Express (FedEx) provide international courier services. Their hubs are in the Clark Freeport Zone. They are complemented by four local couriers operating as the communication and baggage of the province. There are three postal district offices and 35 post office stations distributed in the 20 municipalities and two cities of the province.

=== Water and power ===
Pampanga electrical cooperative service areas

Potable water supply in the province reaches the populace through three levels: Level I (point source system), Level II (communal faucet system), and Level III (individual connections). A well or spring is the pinpointed water source in areas where houses are few as the system is only designed to serve 15 to 25 households. As of 1997, there were 128,571 Level I water system users in the province. The communal faucet system (Level II) serves the rural areas while the Level III system is managed by the Local Water Utilities Administration (LWUA). The system provides individual house connections to all second and first class private subdivisions.

Electric power is distributed to the majority of the towns through the distribution centers of the Pampanga Electric Cooperative (PELCO) which include PELCO I, II, III. Small parts of Candaba and Apalit are also supplied by Manila Electric Company (Meralco). Angeles and small parts of Mabalacat are supplied by Angeles Electric Corporation (AEC) Villa de Bacolor, Guagua, Sta, Rita, Lubao, Sasmuan, Porac, Mabalacat and small part of Floridablanca are supplied by Pampanga Electric Cooperative II (PELCO II). City of San Fernando and Floridablanca is supplied by San Fernando Electric Company (SFELAPCO).

Power is also transmitted to the province through various transmission lines and substations located within the province, such as the Mexico and Clark substations, and Hermosa–Duhat–Balintawak, Mexico–Hermosa, and Hermosa–San Jose transmission lines, all of which are operated and maintained by the National Grid Corporation of the Philippines (NGCP).

In 2018, the Bureau of Internal Revenue (BIR) Regional Office 4 in San Fernando commissioned a 400-kilowatt rooftop solar installation. The project was implemented to reduce operating costs and support government sustainability initiatives.

=== Transportation ===
The province of Pampanga is strategically located at the crossroads of central Luzon and is highly accessible by air and land. The province is home to two airstrips: Basa Air Base in Floridablanca, which is used by the military, and Clark International Airport in Clark Freeport Zone. Pampanga has five municipal ports that function as fish landing centers. These are in the municipalities of Guagua, Macabebe, Masantol, Minalin, and Sasmuan.

==== Road transport ====
Land travel to Pampanga is provided by highways and by buses. Buses that travel the routes of Manila-Bataan, Manila-Zambales, Manila-Tarlac, Manila-Nueva Ecija, Manila-Bulacan-Pampanga, and Manila-Pampanga-Dagupan serve as connections with the nearby provinces and Metro Manila.

The 84 kilometers (52 mi) North Luzon Expressway (NLEX) extends from Balintawak in Quezon City, Metro Manila, to Santa Ines in Mabalacat. It passes through the cities and municipalities of Apalit, San Simon, Santo Tomas, San Fernando, Mexico, Angeles City, and ends on Santa Ines in Mabalacat.

The 94 kilometers (58 mi) four-lane Subic–Clark–Tarlac Expressway (SCTEx) to date, is the longest toll expressway in the Philippines. Its southern terminus is in the Subic Bay Freeport Zone and passes through the Clark Freeport Zone in two interchanges: Clark North and Clark South. The expressway is linked to the North Luzon Expressway through the Mabalacat Interchange. Its northern terminus is located at the Central Techno Park in Tarlac City, Tarlac.

Aside from the expressways, national highways also serve the province. Two major national highways serve Pampanga, the MacArthur Highway (N2) and Jose Abad Santos Avenue (N3). Secondary and tertiary national roads, and provincial roads complement the highway backbone.

== Sports ==
Pampanga is home to notable sports personalities, including billiards player Efren "Bata" Reyes as well as basketball players Japeth Aguilar and Arwind Santos.

The province is also home to the Pampanga Giant Lanterns, which began play in the Maharlika Pilipinas Basketball League (MPBL) during the 2018–19 season. The franchise has won three league championships, two in the MPBL and one in the Pilipinas Super League. The province also hosted the Pampanga Dragons of the defunct Metropolitan Basketball Association (MBA), who were also the league's inaugural champions.

== Government and politics ==
Like other provinces in the Philippines, Pampanga is governed by a governor and vice governor who are elected to three-year terms. The governor is the executive head and leads the province's departments in executing the ordinances and improving public services. The vice governor heads a legislative council (Sangguniang Panlalawigan) consisting of board members from the districts.

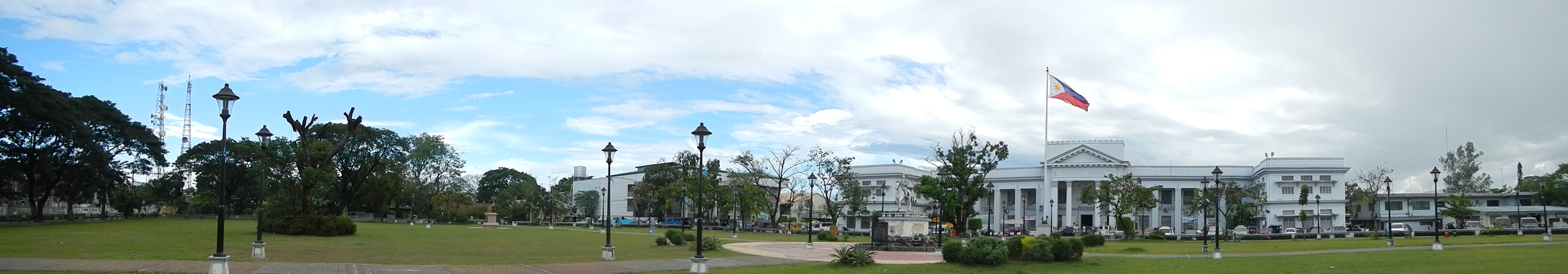
Pampanga Provincial Capitol

=== Provincial government ===
Just as the national government, the provincial government is divided into three branches: executive, legislative, and judiciary. The judicial branch is administered solely by the Supreme Court of the Philippines. The LGUs have control of the executive and legislative branches.

The executive branch is composed of the governor for the province, mayors for the cities and municipalities, and the barangay captains for the barangays. The provincial assembly for the provinces, Sangguniang Panlungsod (city assembly) for the cities, Sangguniang Bayan (town assembly) for the municipalities, Sangguniang Barangay (barangay council), and the Sangguniang Kabataan for the youth sector.

The seat of government is vested upon the governor and other elected officers who hold office at the Provincial Capitol building. The Sangguniang Panlalawigan is the center of legislation.

The Provincial government is composed of a Governor as the Local Chief Executive of the Province, Vice-Governor and Members of the Sangguniang Panlalawigan. The governor is Lilia "Nanay" Pineda (Kambilan) and the vice governor is Dennis "Delta" G. Pineda (NPC).

Members of the Sangguniang Panlalawigan
District	Board member	Party
1st	Cherry D. Manalo	Kambilan
1st	Christian Halili	Kambilan
2nd	Fritzie Dizon (senior board member)	Kambilan
2nd	Sajid Eusoof	Kambilan
2nd	Atty. Claire Lim	Kambilan
3rd	Michaeline DG. Mercado	Lakas–CMD
3rd	Lucky Dinan Labung	Kambilan
3rd	Shiwen Lim	Independent
4th	Dr. Kaye Naguit	Kambilan
4th	Atty. Vince Calara	Kambilan
League	Board member	Party
ABC	Terrence Napao	Nonpartisan
PCL	Vacant	Since June 30, 2025
SK	John Cruz	Nonpartisan

=== House of Representatives ===
District	Representative	Party	Term	Bloc
1st	Carmelo G. Lazatin Jr.	PFP	1	Majority
2nd	Ma. Gloria M. Arroyo	Lakas	2	Majority
3rd	Alyssa Michaela "Mica" M. Gonzales	Lakas	1	Majority
4th	Anna York Cristina P. Bondoc-Sagum	NUP	2	Majority

=== Court system ===
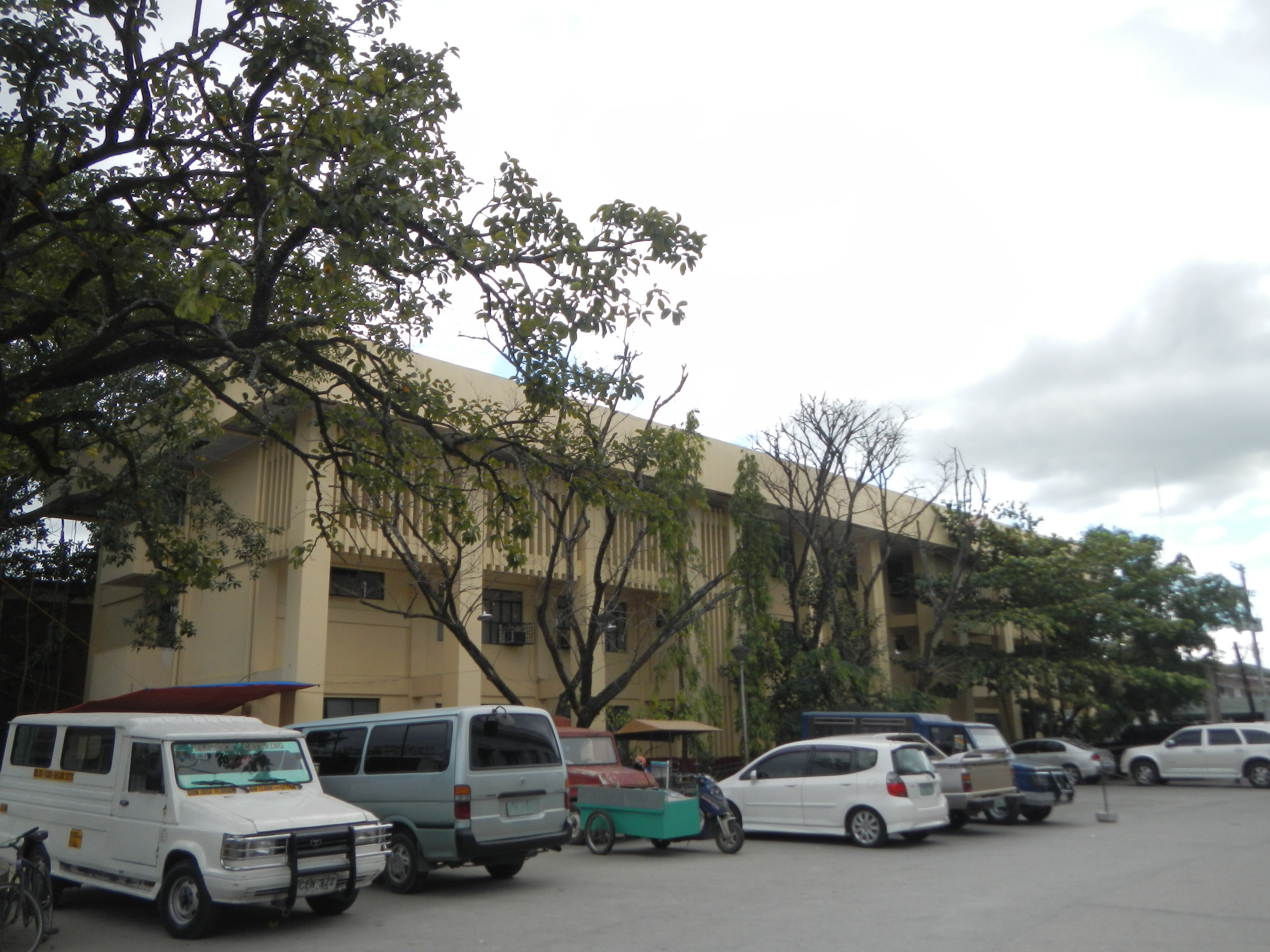
Façade of Halls of Justice (view from the rear of the Capitolio)

The Supreme Court of the Philippines recognizes Pampanga regional trial courts and metropolitan or municipal trial courts within the province and towns, that have an overall jurisdiction in the populace of the province and towns, respectively.

Batas Pambansa Blg. 129, "The Judiciary Reorganization Act of 1980", as amended, created Regional, Metropolitan, Municipal Trial and Circuit Courts. The Third Judicial Region includes RTCs in Bulacan, Nueva Ecija, Pampanga, Palayan and San Jose, inter alia:

xxx. There shall be – (c) Seventy-five Regional Trial judges shall be commissioned for the Third Judicial Region: Twenty-two branches (Branches XLI to LXII) for the province of Pampanga and the city of Angeles, Branches XLI to XLVIII with seats at San Fernando, Branches XLIX to LIII at Guagua, Branches LIV and LV at Macabebe, and Branches LVI to LXII at Angeles;

The law also created Metropolitan Trial Court in each metropolitan area established by law, a Municipal Trial Court in each of the other cities or municipalities, and a Municipal Circuit Trial Court in each circuit comprising such cities and/or municipalities as are grouped together pursuant to law: three branches for Cabanatuan; in every city which does not form part of a metropolitan area, there shall be a Municipal Trial Court with one branch, except as hereunder provided: Three branches for Angeles;

In each of the municipalities that are not comprised within a metropolitan area and a municipal circuit there shall be a Municipal Trial Court which shall have one branch, except as hereunder provided: Four branches for San Fernando and two branches for Guagua, both of Pampanga.

=== Mayors ===
City/municipality	Mayor	Party
City of San Fernando	Vilma Caluag	Independent
Mabalacat City	Atty. Gerald Guttrie P. Aquino	Kambilan
Apalit	Jun Tetangco	NPC
Arayat	Jeffrey Luriz	Nationalist People's Coalition
Bacolor	Diman Datu	Kambilan
Candaba	Rene Maglanque	Kambilan
Floridablanca	Michael Galang	Kambilan
Guagua	Anthony Joseph Torres	Kambilan
Lubao	Esmeralda Pineda	Kambilan
Macabebe	Leonardo Flores	Nacionalista
Magalang	Maria Lourdes Lacson	Kambilan
Masantol	Danilo Guintu	Nacionalista Party
Mexico	Rodencio Gonzales	Lakas–CMD
Minalin	Philip Naguit	Kambilan
Porac	Jaime Capil	Independent
San Luis	Dr. Jayson Sagum	Nacionalista
San Simon	Abundio Punsalan Jr.	Nacionalista
Santa Ana	Ferdinand Labung	Kambilan
Sta. Rita	Reynan Calo	Independent
Sto. Tomas	John Sambo	Kambilan
Sasmuan	Lina Cabrera	Lakas–CMD
*Angeles City	Carmelo B. Lazatin II	Lakas–CMD

== Notable people ==
=== Within the province jurisdiction ===
==== National heroes and historical personalities ====
- Casto Alejandrino – peasant leader and commander of the Hukbalahap
- José Alejandrino – born in Arayat, Philippine revolutionary general and former senator
- Servillano Aquino – Philippine Revolutionary General and member of Malolos Congress for Samar
- Vivencio Cuyugan – former mayor of San Fernando, and one of the founders of the guerrilla group Hukbalahap
- Práxedes Fajardo – Filipina revolutionary and head of the Pampangan section of the Philippine Red Cross during the anticolonial armed struggles against Spain and the United States
- Kumander Liwayway, born Remedios Gomez-Paraiso – celebrated commander of the Hukbalahap
- Nicolasa Dayrit Panlilio – Filipina non-combatant in the Philippine–American War known for ministering to sick and wounded Filipino combatants
- Mamerto Natividad – born in Bacolor, Philippine revolutionary general
- José Abad Santos – born in San Fernando, Pampanga, 5th chief justice of the Supreme Court of the Philippines
- Pedro Abad Santos – former assemblyman and founder of the Aguman ding Talapagobra ning Pilipinas
- Luis Taruc – leader of the Hukbalahap group (from Hukbong Bayan Laban sa Hapon) 1942–1950

==== Politics and government ====
- Oscar Albayalde – police officer, former chief of the Philippine National Police and former director of the National Capital Police Office, born in San Fernando
- Rey Aquino – politician and surgeon; the last municipal mayor of San Fernando and its first mayor when it became a city
- Mercedes Arrastia-Tuason – Philippine diplomat and former ambassador to the Holy See
- Gloria Macapagal Arroyo – 14th president of the Republic of the Philippines; daughter of the 9th president of the Republic Diosdado Macapagal
- Sotero Baluyut – former Philippine senator and former governor of Pampanga
- Zenaida Cruz-Ducut – lawyer and politician; served as representative for the 2nd District of Pampanga
- Pablo Ángeles David – former Philippine senator and former governor of Pampanga
- Rogelio dela Rosa – former Philippine senator and actor, native of Lubao, Pampanga
- Vince Dizon – secretary of public works and highways since 2025; served as secretary of transportation in 2025
- Aurelio Gonzales Jr. – civil engineer and politician; served as congressman, representing the 3rd District of Pampanga
- Bren Guiao – former governor of Pampanga
- Yeng Guiao – basketball head coach, politician, commentator and sports commissioner; vice governor of the province of Pampanga 2004–2013; congressman, representing the 1st District of Pampanga 2013–2016
- Lito Lapid – actor, politician and senator (2004–2016; 2019–present)
- Rafael Lazatin – former governor of Pampanga and former mayor of Angeles City
- Emigdio Lingad – economist and politician; served as congressman, representing the 2nd District of Pampanga
- Jose B. Lingad – former governor of Pampanga and 15th secretary of the Department of the Labor and Employment, native of Lubao, Pampanga
- Francisco Tongio Liongson – medical doctor and politician
- Pedro Tongio Liongson – lawyer, judge, and politician; born in Villa de Bacolor, Pampanga
- Diosdado Pangan Macapagal – 9th president of the Republic of the Philippines and a native of Lubao, Pampanga
- Estelito Mendoza – lawyer and former governor of Pampanga; served as solicitor general of the Philippines during Marcos era
- Mónico R. Mercado – lawyer and politician; served as assemblyman, representing the 1st District of Pampanga
- Francisco Nepomuceno – former congressman, former governor of Pampanga and former mayor of Angeles City
- Juanita Nepomuceno – former representative and former governor of Pampanga
- Satur Ocampo – politician, activist, journalist, and writer; former member of the Philippine House of Representatives for Bayan Muna Partylist
- Eddie Panlilio – born in Minalin, Pampanga; first Filipino priest to be elected governor
- Oscar Samson Rodriguez – politician and lawyer; served as the mayor of San Fernando, Pampanga in the Philippines from 2004 until his third term in 2013
- Edwin Santiago – politician and professional mechanical engineer; served as the mayor of City of San Fernando, Pampanga 2013–2022
- Vicente Abad Santos – 96th associate justice of the Supreme Court of the Philippines, 39th secretary of the Department of Justice
- Amando Tetangco Jr. – born in Apalit, Pampanga; Filipino banker; served as the third governor of the Bangko Sentral ng Pilipinas (BSP); first BSP governor to serve two terms
- Antonio Villa-Real – 25th associate justice of the Supreme Court of the Philippines

==== Culinary arts ====
- Larry Cruz – restaurateur who founded the LJC Restaurant Group, which operates several restaurants in the Philippines, including Café Adriatico, Cafe Havana, Bistro Remedios, and Abe, which was named after his father, the writer E. Aguilar Cruz
- Lucia Cunanan – restaurateur best known for having invented or at least re-invented sisig, a popular Kapampangan dish in the Philippines and Filipino diasporas worldwide

==== Journalism and media ====
- Kara David – journalist, host, professor, and educational administrator
- Randy David – sociologist, public intellectual, and on board of directors of the Philippine media conglomerate ABS-CBN Corporation
- Amando G. Dayrit – pre-war columnist and journalist
- Kristine Johnson – Filipino-American co-anchor at WCBS-TV, born on Clark Air Base
- Ivan Mayrina – broadcaster, journalist, reporter and news anchor
- Orly Punzalan – veteran radio-TV broadcaster and former president of Intercontinental Broadcasting Corporation (IBC-13), born and raised in Apalit
- Jay Sonza – blogger, former newscaster and talk show host

==== Literature and arts ====
- Norma Belleza – painter
- Zoilo Galang – one of the pioneering Filipino writers who worked with the English language; author of the first Philippine novel written in the English language, A Child of Sorrow, published in 1921
- Zoilo Hilario – poet, playwright, lawyer, politician and linguist
- Francisco Alonso Liongson – playwright, born in Villa de Bacolor, Pampanga
- Angela Manalang-Gloria – pioneer Filipina poet who wrote in English, born in Guagua
- Vicente Manansala – National Artist of the Philippines for Visual Arts – Painting, native of Macabebe
- Fernando Ocampo – architect and civil engineer
- Galo Ocampo – modernist painter
- Danton Remoto – writer
- Aurelio Tolentino – original member of the Katipunan and nationalist playwright, born in Guagua

==== Sciences ====
- Norman King – first Aeta graduate of the University of the Philippines Manila, earning a Bachelor Science of Behavioral Science; from Pampanga

==== Religious leaders ====
- Paciano Aniceto – born in Santa Ana, Pampanga, archbishop emeritus Roman Catholic Archdiocese of San Fernando and former second bishop of the Diocese of Iba, Zambales
- Pablo Virgilio David – born in Betis, Guagua, Pampanga, bishop of Roman Catholic Diocese of Kalookan, tenth Filipino cardinal
- Martha de San Bernardo – 17th-century Colettine Poor Clare; first Filipino woman to become a Roman Catholic nun; served on Macao
- Florentino Lavarias – born in Mabalacat, Pampanga, Archbishop of Roman Catholic Archdiocese of San Fernando and formerly the fourth bishop of the Diocese of Iba, Zambales
- Roberto Mallari – born in Macabebe, Pampanga, bishop of Roman Catholic Diocese of San Jose in Nueva Ecija
- Victor Ocampo – born in Angeles, Pampanga, bishop of Roman Catholic Diocese of Gumaca
- Honesto Ongtioco – born in San Fernando, Pampanga, second bishop of Balanga 1998–2003, and first bishop of Cubao 2003–2024
- Apollo C. Quiboloy – born in Davao City to Kapampangan parents from Lubao, Pampanga; founder of Christian religious group Kingdom of Jesus Christ in 1985; proclaiming himself as the "Appointed Son of God", he spent his early childhood in his parents' home province before returning to Davao
- Pedro Paulo Santos – born in Porac, Pampanga, first parish priest of Calulut, assigned as parish priest of Angeles City, appointed as bishop of Nueva Caceres in 1938, then as its first archbishop on 1951
- Rufino Jiao Santos – born in Guagua, Pampanga, archbishop of Manila 1953–1973; first Filipino cardinal
- Eliseo Soriano – televangelist of Ang Dating Daan and the Over-all Servant of Members Church of God International which has its main headquarters in Apalit, Pampanga
- Crisostomo Yalung – born in Angeles, Pampanga, bishop emeritus of Roman Catholic Diocese of Antipolo, retired in 2002

==== Entertainment ====
- apl.de.ap, born Allan Pineda Lindo – founding member of The Black Eyed Peas, born in Sapang Bato, Angeles
- Ritz Azul – actress
- Hermes Bautista – actor
- Carlo J. Caparas – Filipino film director
- Jaime dela Rosa – matinee idol in the 1950s of Lubao, Pampanga
- Ryzza Mae Dizon – Flipina actress and television host of Eat Bulaga!
- Baron Geisler – actor
- Sheena Halili – model and actress from San Fernando
- Hilda Koronel, veteran actress
- Jason Paul Laxamana – Filipino film director and writer
- Joey Marquez – ex-politician, comedy actor
- Brillante Mendoza – Filipino film director from San Fernando, Pampanga
- Kelsey Merritt – Filipino-American model best known for being the first woman of Filipino descent to walk in the Victoria's Secret fashion show and to appear in the pages of the Sports Illustrated Swimsuit Issue
- Vanessa Minnillo – American television personality; born on Clark Air Base, Angeles, and raised in the US
- Donita Rose – Filipino-American actress, lived in Angeles City for a few years
- Mika Salamanca – actress, singer, and social media influencer who became a Big Winner (alongside her duo Brent Manalo) on Pinoy Big Brother: Celebrity Collab Edition
- Lea Salonga – singer and actress, spent the first six years of her childhood in Angeles before moving to Manila
- Pepe Smith – singer and member of Juan de la Cruz Band
- Petersen Vargas – Filipino film director and writer

==== Pageantry ====
- Jasmin Bungay – Binibining Philippines, Globe 2024
- Ann Colis – Miss Globe 2015
- Michelle Dee – Miss World Philippines 2019
- Laura Marie Dunlap – Miss Philippines Earth 2003
- Angela Fernando – Miss Eco Tourism Philippines 201
- Melanie Marquez – Miss International 1979
- Cyrille Payumo – Miss Charm 2025 Top 20, and crowned Miss Tourism International 2019
- Francesca Taruc – Miss Tourism World Intercontinental 2019
- Emma Tiglao – Miss Grand International 2025

==== Sports ====
- Calvin Abueva – Filipino professional basketball player from Angeles
- Japeth Aguilar – Filipino professional basketball player from Sasmuan, Pampanga
- Ato Agustin – Filipino professional basketball player and coach, from Lubao, Pampanga
- Justine Baltazar – Filipino professional basketball player from Mabalacat, Pampanga
- Diana Mae Carlos – Filipino volleyball athlete from Lubao, Pampanga
- Jayson Castro – Filipino professional basketball player from Guagua, Pampanga
- Russel Escoto – Filipino professional basketball player from Angeles
- Victonara Galang – Filipino volleyball athlete from Angeles
- Donald Geisler – taekwondo athlete
- Norman Gonzales – Filipino professional basketball player from Magalang
- JC Intal – Filipino professional basketball player from Minalin, Pampanga
- Mark Macapagal – Filipino professional basketball player from Macabebe, Pampanga
- Michael Miranda – Filipino professional basketball player from Santa, Ana, Pampanga
- Efren "Bata" Reyes – billiards player from Angeles
- Ian Sangalang – Filipino professional basketball player from Lubao, Pampanga
- Arwind Santos – Filipino professional basketball player from Lubao, Pampanga
