= Fabian Dayrit =

Fabian M. Dayrit is a professor of chemistry of the Department of Chemistry, School of Science and Engineering, Ateneo de Manila University. He served as the first dean of the Ateneo de Manila University's School of Science and Engineering.

He graduated from Ateneo de Manila High School. He then pursued B.S. Chemistry at the Ateneo de Manila University (cum laude). Then he attended Princeton University in New Jersey, U.S. where he finished his M.S. and Ph.D. degrees.

He is also the current Director of the National Chemistry Instrumentation Center. He was also the President of the Integrated Chemists of the Philippines from 1996 to 2025.
