= Kapampangan cuisine =

Culinary tradition

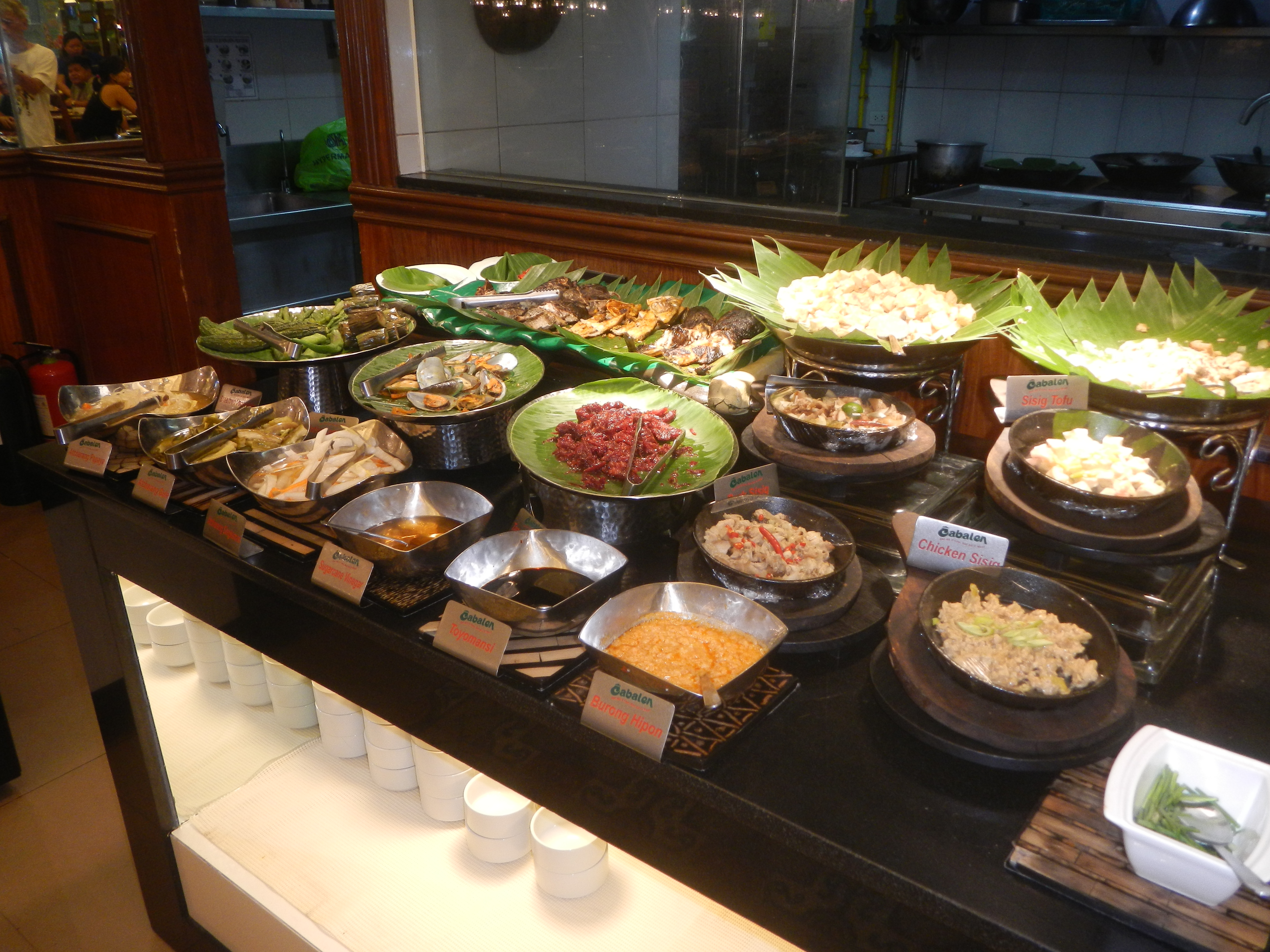
Kapampangan dishes, including the varieties of sisig, at a Cabalen restaurant in Bulacan

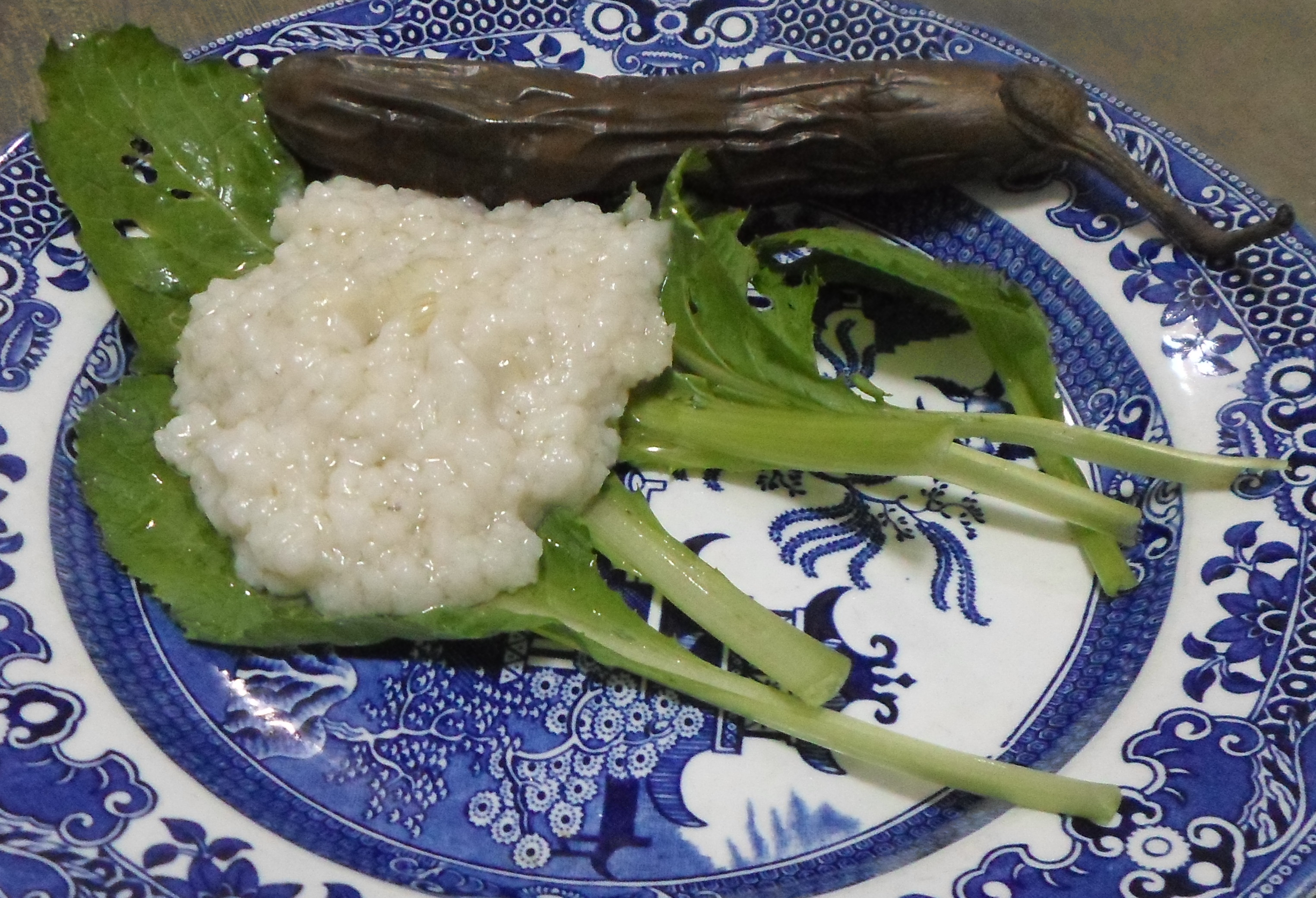
Buro with mustard leaves and eggplant

Kapampangan cuisine (Kapampangan: Lútûng Kapampángan) differed noticeably from other groups in the Philippines. The Kapampangan kitchen is the biggest and most widely used room in the traditional Kapampangan household.

When the Philippines was under Spanish rule, Spanish friars and sailors taught Kapampangans the basics of Spanish cooking. The Kapampangans were able to produce a unique blend that surprised the Spanish palate. Soon, Spanish friars and government officials were entertaining foreign guests at the expense of Kapampangan households. In the late 18th century, the Arnedo clan of Apalit were commissioned by the colonial government to entertain foreign dignitaries, including a Cambodian prince and a Russian archduke. Kapampangans were given the task of creating the meals and menus that were served in the proclamation of the First Philippine Republic in Malolos, Bulacan.

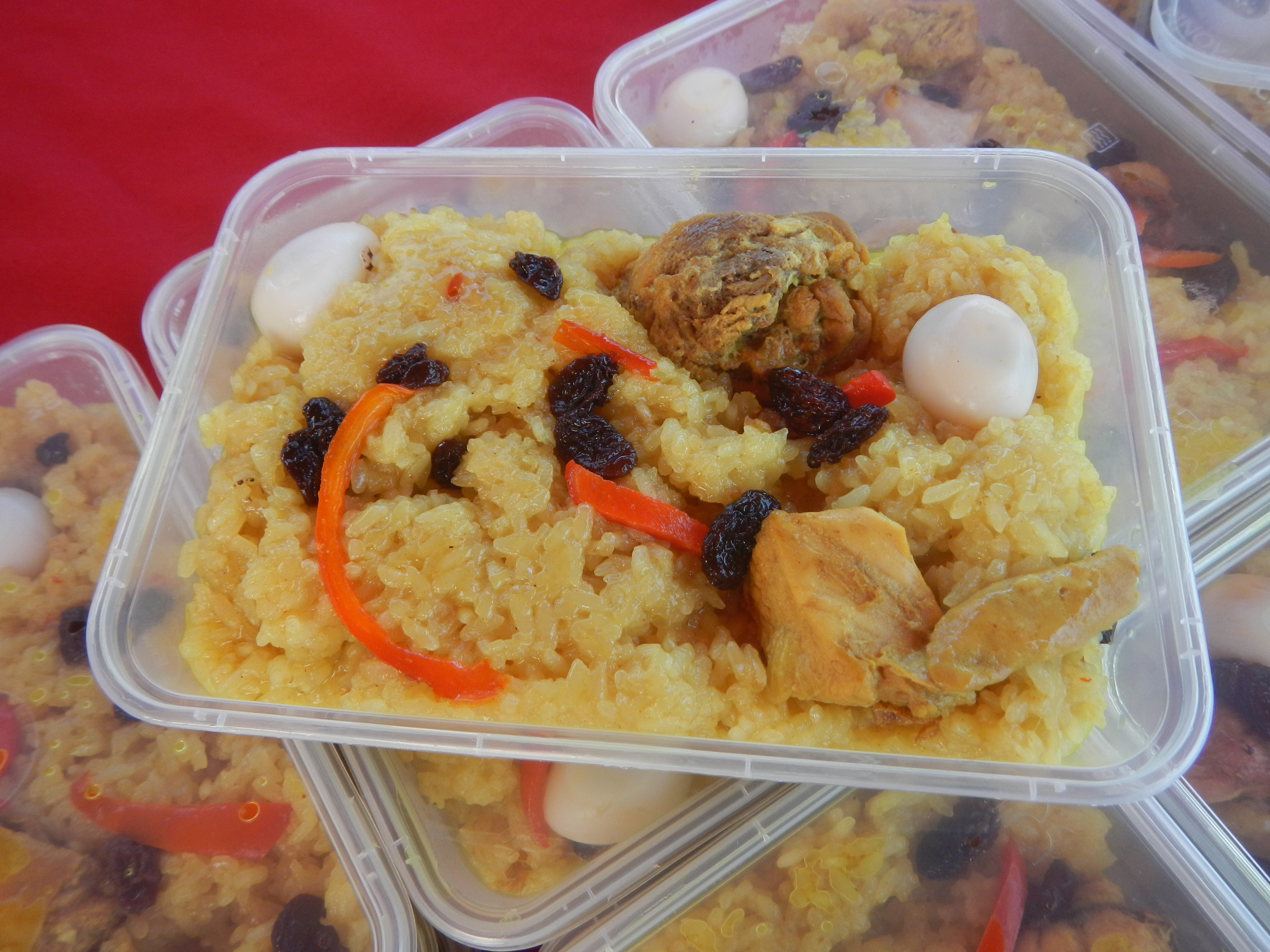
Kapampangan dish displayed at the Santa Rita Pampanga Duman Festival

Some popular Kapampangan dishes include sisig, morcon, menudo, caldereta, estofado, embotido, asado, lengua, lechon, chicharon, afritada, sipo egg, bringhi (paella), tabang talangka (crab meat), the "tocino" or pindang including pindang damulag or carabao’s meat tocino and their native version of the longganisa. A unique Kapampangan dish that is well enjoyed by other ethnic groups is nasing biringyi (chicken saffron rice). Since nasing biringyi is so difficult to prepare, this unique Kapampangan dish can only be enjoyed during fiestas in Pampanga. It is comparable to Malaysian nasi biryani.

Some unusual Kapampangan dishes include balo balo or burung bulig (mudfish fermented in rice) from Candaba, betute tugak (stuffed frogs) from Mexico (Pampanga) and Magalang, adobung kamaru (mole crickets sautéed in vinegar and garlic), calderetang barag (spicy monitor lizard stew), kubang asu (sweet and spicy dog stew) from Macabebe, and tidtad itik (duck stewed in blood) from Masantol.

Other heritage dishes include tidtad (dinuguan, a stew of fresh pig's blood, cooked with pork and liver), begukan (ribs and liempo cooked in pork & shrimp paste), hornong pistu (baked pork meatloaf of chorizo, ham and cheese), asadong dila (ox tongue with sauce and castañas) and kilayin (chopped liver and lungs).

== See also ==
- Betutu, a Balinese dish
- Biryani
- Filipino Chinese cuisine
- Kapampangan people
- Macanese cuisine
- Pampanga

== Bibliography ==
- Gilda Cordero-Fernando, Philippine Food & Life, Anvil Publishing: 1992, Pasig, Metro Manila.
- Gene R. Gonzales, Cocina Sulipeña: Culinary Gems from Old Pampanga, Anvil Publishing: 2002, Pasig, Metro Manila.
- Larkin, John A. 1972. The Pampangans: Colonial Society in a Philippine Province. 1993 Philippine Edition. Quezon City: New Day Publishers.
