= Amando G. Dayrit =

Amando G. Dayrit (1912–1944) was born in San Jose, San Fernando, Pampanga to Florentino Singian Dayrit and Juana Gatchalian Galang. A prolific writer and columnist, he was author of the renowned "Tribune" column "Good Morning Judge". During the Japanese Occupation, he contributed to the underground "Free Philippines". He contracted tuberculosis in his pursuit of freedom and was under house arrest in Manila. He was later allowed to return to San Fernando where he died shortly after.
