= List of city and municipality nicknames in the Philippines =

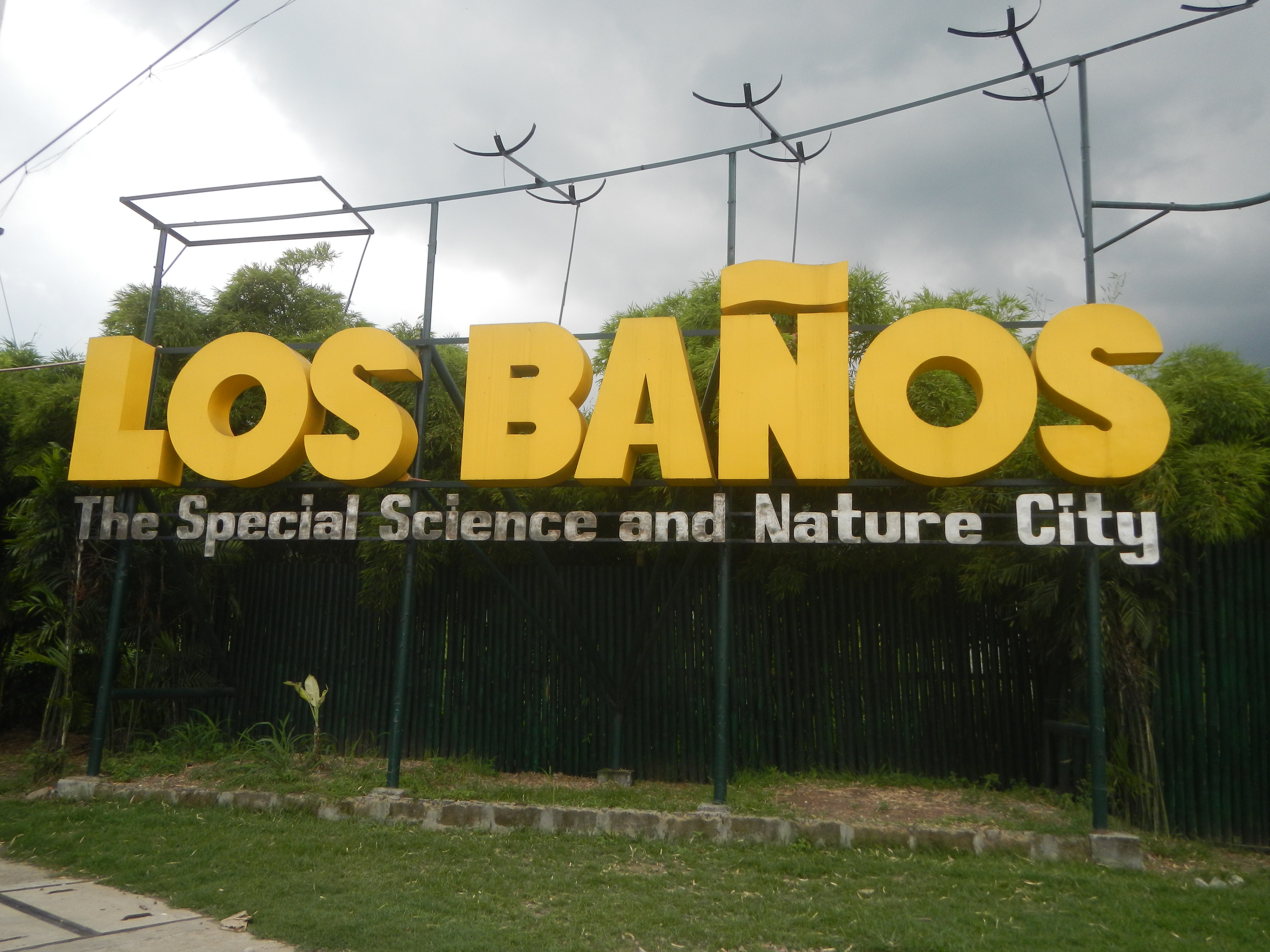
Signage in Los Baños showing its nickname

This partial list of city and municipality nicknames in the Philippines compiles the aliases, sobriquets, and slogans that cities and municipalities in the Philippines are known by (or have been known historically by), officially and unofficially, to municipal governments, local people, outsiders, or their tourism boards or chambers of commerce.

== List ==
City/Municipality	Province	Region	Nickname(s)	Notes
Amadeo	Cavite	Calabarzon	Coffee Capital of the Philippines	After the town's coffee growing industry.
Angeles	Pampanga (geographically only)	Central Luzon	City of Angels	After the city's etymology.
Angono	Rizal	Calabarzon	Art Capital of the Philippines	Due to the town being able to produce two National Artists despite its small population; namely, Botong Francisco for painting and Lucio San Pedro for music. The nickname is unofficial in the sense that there is no legal document conferring the title although the designation has been used to promote tourism in the town.
Antipolo	Rizal	Calabarzon	Pilgrimage Capital of the Philippines	Due to the presence of the Marian image of the Our Lady of Peace and Good Voyage or the Virgin of Antipolo, which was brought in from Mexico in 1626, and enshrined in the Antipolo Cathedral has a continuous following among Filipino Catholics since the Spanish colonial era.
Apalit	Pampanga	Central Luzon	Blacksmith Capital of Pampanga	Due to being the hometown of a Spanish-era blacksmith named Pande Pira who is said to be the first cannon maker in the Philippines. He is said to be the progenitor of the town's metal crafts industry. Among the town's known metal-derived products include bolos, machetes, and knives.
Bacolod	Negros Occidental (geographically only)	Negros Island Region	City of Smiles	Came from introduction of the MassKara Festival, which is known as a "festival of smiles", in 1980 as a response to a socioeconomic crisis in that period.
Bacoor	Cavite	Calabarzon	Marching Band Capital of the Philippines	As per Proclamation No. 939 issued by President Rodrigo Duterte in 2020. A recognition to Bacoor being the birthplace of the country's oldest marching bands and continued tradition of producing music troupes such as community marching bands, and school-based drum and lyre corps.
Balanga	Bataan	Central Luzon	Banga Capital of the Philippines	It is said that the name “Balanga” was derived from a kind of pot used for cooking or fetching water. This cooking pot is made of special clay and it is locally known as “banga” or “balanga”. During the Spanish occupation people of this community often use this pot for fetching water and the Spaniards would ask what they call it, and they would answer, “Banga”. The Spaniards would repeat the word until they adopt the name of the community. From then on this place was called Balanga.
Baguio	Benguet (geographically only)	Cordillera Administrative Region	Summer Capital of the Philippines	During the American period, Baguio became a chartered city and was declared the Summer Capital of the Philippines. The Mansion became the official residence of the Governor-General in the city. Nowadays, the nickname is a reference to the city's relatively cool weather, which is comparable to areas which have a temperate climate.
Baguio	Benguet (geographically only)	Cordillera Administrative Region	City of Pines	Baguio is known for its pine trees.
Barotac Nuevo	Iloilo	Western Visayas	Football Capital of the Philippines	Due to the popularity of association football in the town compared to other parts of the country, where basketball has a better reception. The town is known for producing several players for the Philippines men's national team, including Ian and Mariano Araneta, Elmer Bedia, Jovin Bedic, Chieffy Caligdong, Antonio Piao, and Roel Gener.
Bocaue	Bulacan	Central Luzon	Fireworks Capital of the Philippines	After the town's firecrackers and fireworks industry.
Butuan	Agusan del Norte (geographically only)	Caraga	Home of the Balangays	
Butuan	Agusan del Norte (geographically only)	Caraga	Timber City of the South	
Cabanatuan	Nueva Ecija	Central Luzon	Tricycle Capital of the Philippines	After the prominence of motorized tricycles in the city.
Cadiz	Negros Occidental	Negros Island Region	City of Whales	The nickname was adopted in reference to a 1967 event which saw several humpback whales get beached on the shores of Cadiz.
Cagayan de Oro	Misamis Oriental (geographically only)	Northern Mindanao	City of Golden Friendship	Due to the warm welcoming smiles and the utmost hospitality of the locals.
Calamba	Laguna	Calabarzon	Hot Spring Capital of the Philippines	Due to the proliferation of hot spring resorts in the city.
Candon	Ilocos Sur	Ilocos Region	Tobacco Capital of the Philippines	Due to the abundance of tobacco in the city.
Carles	Iloilo	Western Visayas	Alaska of the Philippines	The Carles and Estancia towns share the nickname "Alaska of the Philippines" after its bountiful marine resources.
Carmona	Cavite	Calabarzon	The Smart City	Used since 2021 before Carmona's cityhood. A spherical landmark was built, officially named Smart City Landmark, in honor of this nickname.
Cebu City	Cebu (geographically only)	Central Visayas	Queen City of the South	Due to an economic boom of the city in the mid to late 1900s. The title was originally claimed by Iloilo City only.
Dagupan	Pangasinan (geographically only)	Ilocos Region	Bangus Capital of the Philippines	After Dagupan's local milkfish (bangus) industry. In 2002, the city government organized the first Bangus Festival as part of a "bid to gain the title"
Dapitan	Zamboanga del Sur	Zamboanga Peninsula	Shrine City of the Philippines	This is where the national hero, José Rizal was exiled by the Spanish colonial authorities for his threat to start revolutionary activities.
Dapitan	Zamboanga del Sur	Zamboanga Peninsula	Historic City of the South	This is where the national hero, José Rizal was exiled by the Spanish colonial authorities for his threat to start revolutionary activities.
Dapitan	Zamboanga del Sur	Zamboanga Peninsula	Rizal City of the South	This is where the national hero, José Rizal was exiled by the Spanish colonial authorities for his threat to start revolutionary activities.
Davao City	Davao del Sur (geographically only)	Davao Region	King City of the South	
Davao City	Davao del Sur (geographically only)	Davao Region	Crown Jewel of Mindanao	
Davao City	Davao del Sur (geographically only)	Davao Region	Durian Capital of the Philippines	The durian fruit is among the major produce of the city.
Davao City	Davao del Sur (geographically only)	Davao Region	Chocolate Capital of the Philippines	As per Republic Act No. 11547 signed by President Rodrigo Duterte. Davao City hosts majority of the 20,000 hectares (49,000 acres) of cacao farms in the Davao Region, including Malagos Chocolate which produced chocolate products that have garnered international recognition.
Donsol	Sorsogon	Bicol Region	Whale Shark Capital of the World	After Donsol's ecotourism with the town touted as a good place for tourists to view whale sharks.
Dumaguete	Negros Oriental	Negros Island Region	The City of Gentle People	Due to the city's ability to enthral and captivate its visitors, charming them of its natural beauty and their lovely people.
General Luna	Surigao del Norte	Caraga	Surfing Capital of the Philippines	Inherited from the nickname of Siargao Island, which is promoted as a surfing destination.
General Santos	South Cotabato (geographically only)	Soccsksargen	Tuna Capital of the Philippines	The tuna fish is among the major produce of the city which was commonly available at nearby Sarangani Bay.
Iligan	Lanao del Norte (geographically only)	Northern Mindanao	City of Majestic Waterfalls	Named after Maria Cristina Falls which is located in the city.
Iloilo City	Iloilo (geographically only)	Western Visayas	Most Loyal and Noble City	Granted by Queen Regent Maria Christina of Austria in 1898, in recognition of the city's loyalty to the Spanish Crown during the Philippine Revolution.
Iloilo City	Iloilo (geographically only)	Western Visayas	Queen City of the South	Iloilo was considered the Philippines' second most important city after Manila during the late 19th century. The title has also been claimed by Cebu City.
Iloilo City	Iloilo (geographically only)	Western Visayas	City of Love	Ilonggos are known for their distinct way of speaking, which is often described as soothing to the ears. See also: Nicknames of Iloilo City
Imus	Cavite	Calabarzon	Flag Capital of the Philippines	Imus is said to be the site where Philippine flag was unfurled for the first time during the Battle of Alapan of the Philippine Revolution.
Kidapawan	Cotabato	Soccsksargen	City of Fruits	After the city's fruit industry. Kidapawan is known for the Timpupo festival, a harvest festival showcasing locally grown fruits.
La Trinidad	Benguet	Cordillera Administrative Region	Strawberry Capital of the Philippines	After the town's strawberry cultivation industry.
La Trinidad	Benguet	Cordillera Administrative Region	Salad Bowl of the Philippines	After the town's vegetable cultivation industry. Nickname also applies to the Benguet province.
Lapu-Lapu City	Cebu (geographically only)	Central Visayas	Historic Resort City	From a marketing campaign launched in 2014 by the city government to promote the city as destination for resorts.
Las Piñas	n/a	Metro Manila	Home of the Bamboo Organ	The iconic bamboo organ is located inside St. Joseph Parish Church which has a total of 1,031 pipes of which 902 are made of bamboo and the remaining pipes are made of metal.
Legazpi	Albay	Bicol Region	Gateway City of Bicol	
Los Baños	Laguna	Calabarzon	Special Science and Nature City of the Philippines	As per Proclamation Order No. 349 issued by President Joseph Estrada on August 7, 2000. The issuances cited the city's recognition as a "national and international center of learning in the various fields of human knowledge such as the arts, humanities, ecology, socio-economics and mostly notably science in its basic, natural and applied forms" and the motivation of Los Baños' residents to pursue a "higher status while preserving the ecology" for their city.
Makati	n/a	Metro Manila	Business Capital of the Philippines	Due to the city being the host of numerous corporate and office buildings, particularly its central business district.
Mandaluyong	n/a	Metro Manila	Tiger City	The nickname comes from the classification of Mandaluyong as a "Tiger City" under the Philippine Cities Competitiveness Ranking Project 2002 report of the Department of Trade and Industry and the Asian Institute of Management Policy Center due to the city's increase in generated income from 1986.
Mandaue	Cebu (geographically only)	Central Visayas	Furniture Capital of the Philippines	The city is known for its furniture shows and furniture manufacturing industry.
Manila	n/a	Metro Manila	Pearl of the Orient	See also: Nicknames of Manila
Marawi	Lanao del Sur	Bangsamoro	Islamic City	Due to its Muslim-majority population and historic roots with Islam. Marawi was declared as an "Islamic City" by the city council in 1980.
Marikina	n/a	Metro Manila	Shoe Capital of the Philippines	After the city's shoemaking industry.
Muntinlupa	n/a	Metro Manila	Emerald City	After the city's urban biodiversity.
Naga	Camarines Sur (geographically only)	Bicol Region	The Queen City of Bicol	
Navotas	n/a	Metro Manila	Fishing Capital of the Philippines	After the city's fishing industry which is a major part of Navotas' economy. The status of the city as the "Fishing Capital of the Philippines" is represented on its city seal by a fish.
Olongapo	Zambales (geographically only)	Central Luzon	City of Volunteers	
Paete	Laguna	Calabarzon	Woodcarving Capital of the Philippines	As per Proclamation No. 809 issued by President Gloria Macapagal Arroyo in 2005
Pagadian	Zamboanga del Sur	Zamboanga Peninsula	Little Hongkong of the South	
Parañaque	n/a	Metro Manila	Bay City	The nickname was adopted in 2015 by the city government as part of a tourism campaign. Bay City is a reference to the city bordering two bodies of water; Manila Bay and Laguna de Bay.
Pasay	n/a	Metro Manila	The Travel City	
Passi	Iloilo	Western Visayas	Sweet City at The Heart of Panay	Due to its vast pineapple plantations and annual output in fruit production, and because the city lies in the bosom of Panay.
Pateros	n/a	Metro Manila	Balut Capital of the Philippines	After the town's balut industry.
Puerto Galera	Oriental Mindoro	Mimaropa	Poor Man's Boracay	Comparison to the resort island of Boracay. Reportedly it cost less to visit Puerto Galera as a tourist.
Puerto Princesa	Palawan (geographically only)	Mimaropa	Eco-Tourism Capital of the Philippines	As per the Puerto Princesa Board. After the city's ecotourism industry.
Quezon City	n/a	Metro Manila	The City of Stars	Due to the city being the hub of several media companies and television networks, such as ABS-CBN Corporation (ABS-CBN) and GMA Network, Inc. (GMA)
Roxas	Capiz	Western Visayas	Seafood Capital of the Philippines	The city is known for its abundance in marine life from prawns to crabs, marlins to catfish, and mussels to angel wings (diwal).
San Fernando	Pampanga	Central Luzon	Christmas Capital of the Philippines	After the local parol or Christmas lantern-making industry of the city and the Giant Lantern Festival.
San Juan	n/a	Metro Manila	Tiangge Capital of the Philippines	The city is known for its tiangge or flea markets. The Greenhills Shopping Center is a major host of tiangge.
San Mateo	Isabela	Cagayan Valley	Munggo Capital of the Philippines	
Santo Tomas	Pampanga	Central Luzon	Coffin Capital of Central Luzon	After the coffin-making industry of the town, which is concentrated in Barangay San Vicente.
Sitangkai	Tawi-Tawi	Bangsamoro	Venice of the South	In comparison with the Italian city of Venice due to the town having canals and waterways as its main thoroughfare instead of roads.
Taal	Batangas	Calabarzon	Heritage Town	After the Taal Heritage Town, a tourist attraction known for its ancestral houses and centuries-old churches. For this reason, the town is also known as the Vigan of the South, a reference to the town Vigan in Ilocos Sur.
Taal	Batangas	Calabarzon	Vigan of the South	After the Taal Heritage Town, a tourist attraction known for its ancestral houses and centuries-old churches. For this reason, the town is also known as the Vigan of the South, a reference to the town Vigan in Ilocos Sur.
Tacloban	Leyte (geographically only)	Eastern Visayas	Home of the Happiest People in the World	After a tourism campaign adopted by the city government in 2018. The moniker came from the tagline "Happiest people in the world", which in turn represents the optimistic aspirations of the city after it was devastated by Super Typhoon Yolanda (Haiyan) in 2013.
Tagum	Davao del Norte	Davao Region	Music Capital of the South	The city is known for its Musikahan sa Tagum music festival.
Tuguegarao	Cagayan	Cagayan Valley	Premier Ibanag City of the North	The nickname or "tagline" highlights the Ibanag ethnolinguistic group.
Vigan	Ilocos Sur	Ilocos Region	Heritage City	This city is one of UNESCO World Heritage Sites and it is one of the few Spanish colonial towns left in the Philippines whose old structures have mostly remained intact like Calle Crisologo.
Zamboanga City	Zamboanga del Sur (geographically only)	Zamboanga Peninsula	Asia's Latin City	Due to the city being known as the origin of the Spanish-based creole, Chavacano. This is the result of the Spanish long presence in the city, particularly in Fort Pilar. The nickname was adopted by the city government in 2006 under Mayor Celso Lobregat during the 15th Mindanao Business Conference.
Zamboanga City	Zamboanga del Sur (geographically only)	Zamboanga Peninsula	City of Flowers	After the etymology of "Zamboanga". Zamboanga was derived from the Malay word "Jambangan" which means "land of flowers".
Zamboanga City	Zamboanga del Sur (geographically only)	Zamboanga Peninsula	Convention Capital of the Philippines	
Zamboanga City	Zamboanga del Sur (geographically only)	Zamboanga Peninsula	Sardines Capital of the Philippines	Due to Zamboanga City being a major hub of sardine canning factories in the Philippines.

== See also ==
- List of province nicknames in the Philippines
- Lists of nicknames – nickname list articles on Wikipedia
