= Paskuhan Village =

Philippine theme park

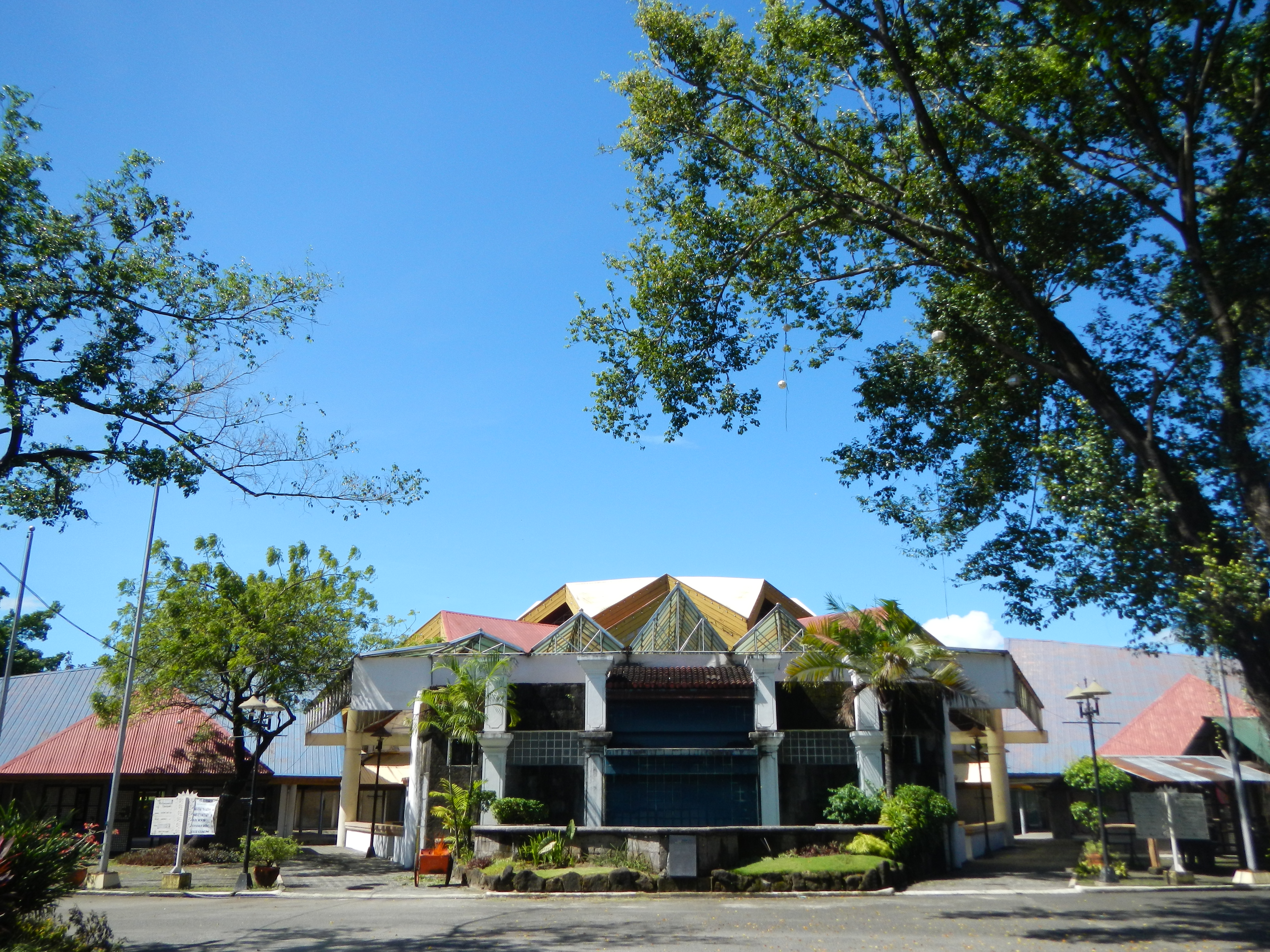
- Interactive map of Paskuhan Village
- Location: San Fernando, Pampanga, Philippines
- Coordinates: 15°03′01.4″N 120°41′33.6″E
- Opened: 11 December 1990
- Owner: Tourism Infrastructure and Enterprise Zone Authority - SM Development Corporation
- Theme: Christmas handicraft Northern Luzon culture (formerly)
- Operating season: Year-round

The Paskuhan Village, officially known as the Philippine Christmas Village and sometimes known as Hilaga, is a Christmas-themed park located in San Fernando, Pampanga, Philippines. It is operational year-round and is managed by the Tourism Infrastructure and Enterprise Zone Authority.

== History ==
=== Early operational history ===
The former owner of the land that the Paskuhan Village now occupies, Jesus Lazatin, sold the land to the Philippine Tourism Authority (now the Tourism Infrastructure and Enterprise Zone Authority or TIEZA) in 1989 so that it could be used to showcase the San Fernando's lantern-making tradition. The theme park was conceptualized by then-Pampanga Governor Bren Guiao, then-Tourism Secretary Jose Antonio Gonzalez, and then-Center for International Trades, Expositions and Missions Director Mina Gabor

It was opened on December 11, 1990, by then-president Corazon Aquino, the Paskuhan Village showcased small and giant lanterns and other Christmas-related items in an effort to support local craftsmen and entrepreneurs. An "Environmental Consciousness Week" was held at the park in March 1993 to promote environmental awareness; proceeds were directed toward the Pinatubo Trust Fund and the Bahay Pag-Ibig nursing home. During 1998, then-First Lady Amelita Ramos attempted to recreate the village as part of the "Florikultura '98" project of the Department of Tourism, but the plants withered and died the year after.

Paskuhan Village also served as the venue of the Ligligan Parul or the Giant Lantern Festival from 1990 until 1998.

=== Decline ===
The 1991 eruption of Mount Pinatubo as well as the establishment of shopping malls in Pampanga contributed to the decline of Paskuhan. The Ligligan Parul festivities was moved to SM City Pampanga in 2000 and to Robinsons Starmills sometime after 2007.

The Department of Foreign Affairs used to host a consular office which issues passports in Paskuhan until 2002. Paskuhan was converted to the North Philippines Cultural and Historical Village known as WOW Philippines in 2003, which showcased the culture of the Ilocos, Cagayan Valley, Central Luzon and Cordillera regions.

The Pampanga Mayors' League issued a resolution as early as 2009 to start the process to come to an agreement with the Department of Tourism so that the Mayors' League could acquire management and jurisdiction over Paskuhan.

As of 2012, the Village was under significant financial strain; all shops, restaurants and other features were practically closed, with a budget of only 800 thousand pesos a month and only 24 workers left. By that time Paskuhan had discarded its Northern Luzon theme. The Commission on Audit advised TIEZA to rehabilitate, privatize or handover the facility to the local government in a 2012 circular. In the same year, the Sangguniang Panlalawigan (lit. 'Provincial Council') of Pampanga filed a resolution to establish a branch of Casino Filipino within Paskuhan, a plan opposed by the religious sector, militant organizations, and a parent–teacher association.

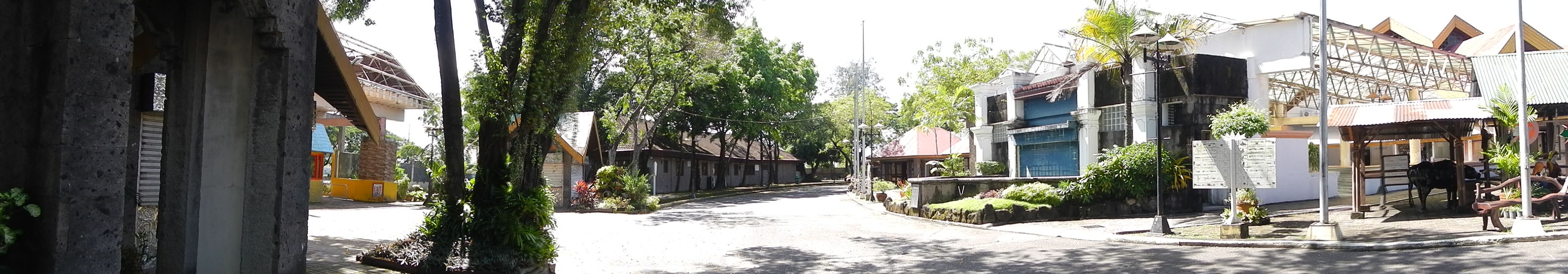
The main buildings and shops of Paskuhan Village. October 2012.

=== 2015 sale of Paskuhan ===
Four SM Group affiliates (SM Development Corp., Premier Central Inc., SM Prime Holdings and SEJ North Premier Holding Corp.) and Robinsons Land Corp. engaged in an open bidding for purchase of the Paskuhan Village on December 17, 2014. The Pampanga provincial government had offered to buy the facility at book value or acquire administration and operational rights over the property three days earlier. The San Fernando city government also filed a counter-proposal to the bid initially contested among the five firms. Premier Central Inc. won the bid and purchased two lots of the Paskuhan Village in May 2015 so that the facility could be redeveloped; however, the Village decayed further due to a sales dispute.

House Resolution 654, which was filed by Pampanga Third District Representative Aurelio Gonzales Jr., called for an. investigation on Paskuhan's sale. The sale was declared void on October 2, 2017, by Solicitor General Jose Calida. The Committee on Good Government And Public Accountability of the House of Representatives had recommended the nullification of the sale for violating the Tourism Act of 2009, which prohibits the sale of state-owned cultural treasures and heritage sites. The body also cited their findings that the right of first refusal entitled to the local governments of Pampanga and San Fernando was ignored.

==== Court of Appeals judgment ====
The Court of Appeals of the Philippines' Fourth Division Decision, dated May 23, 2024, granted Aurelio Gonzales Jr.'s certiorari annulling Regional Trial Court, Branch 42, San Fernando, Pampanga's judgment. The ruling allowed Gonzalez' intervention in the compromise agreement between San Fernando City and Premier Central, Inc.'s P939 million sale of Paskuhan Village. The "deed of donation" transferred 5,000 square meters of the 9.3 hectares sold to Premier Central, Inc. and a 2-story building to San Fernando, and a company would construct an amphitheater. Gonzales was granted the right to file complaints on the Tourism Infrastructure and Enterprise Zone Authority sale decision of Paskuhan Village to Premier Central Inc. (PCI) in 2014 for P939 million.

=== Future plans ===
Following the annulment of the sale to Premier Central, San Fernando Mayor Edwin Santiago advocated for the revival of the Paskuhan as a Christmas-themed park and the return of the Giant Lantern Festival to the venue; the city's plan to acquire the property was still being deliberated at the time. As of July 2020, themajority of Paskuhan Village property was given back to the local government of San Fernando. In February 2021, a groundbreaking ceremony was held at the former site for the construction of a Giant Lantern Festival-themed tourism and information center.

==== City of San Fernando Giant Lantern and Tourist Information Center ====
On May 27, 2023, the City of San Fernando Giant Lantern and Tourist Information Center was inaugurated by Mayor Edwin Santiago as testament to Kapampangan heritage and realization of SFP as Home of the Giant Lanterns.

The center's lantern heritage exhibits are curated by Raphaelle Kalaw and Tourism officer Ma. Lourdes Carmella Jade “Ching” Pangilinan; the exhibits showcase works of art by Jude Pangilinan, Don De Dios, Rafael Maniago, Alvaro Jimenez, Noel Lopez Catacutan and Joel Mallari. The center also showcases the capiz lantern chandeliers, interpretations of Cesar Legaspi’s mural “Bayanihan” and drafts of award-winning giant lanterns from Teddy Aguilar, Efren Tiodin, and Cesareo Sason.

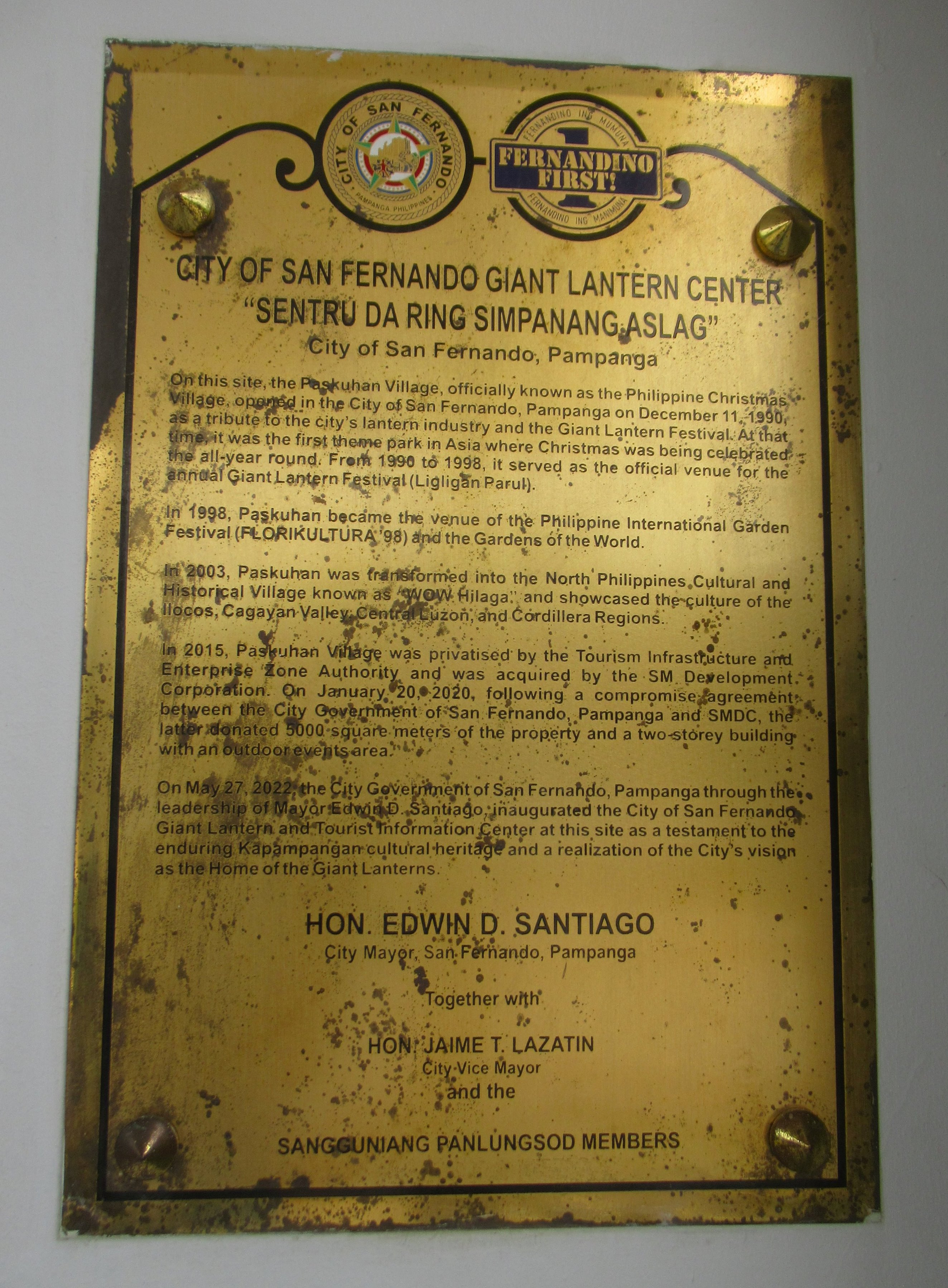
Historical marker
