= Edwin Santiago =

Mayor of San Fernando, Pampanga from 2013 to 2022

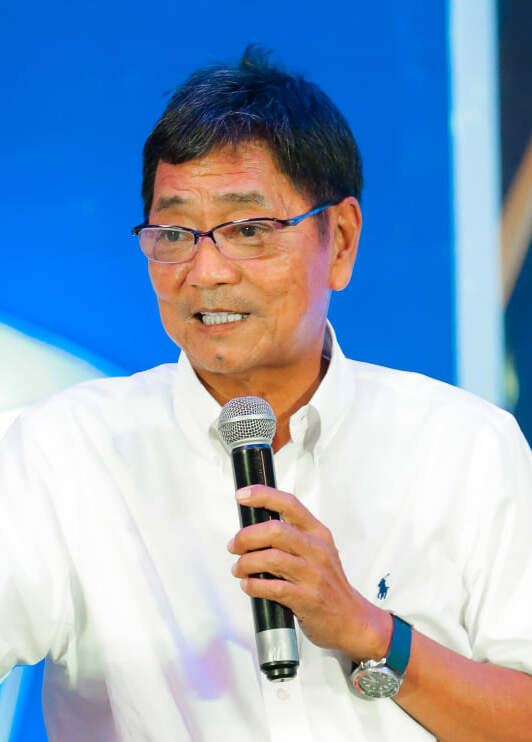
- Santiago in 2022

32nd Mayor of San Fernando, Pampanga
- In office June 30, 2013 – June 30, 2022
- Vice Mayor: Jaime Lazatin
- Preceded by: Oscar Rodriguez
- Succeeded by: Vilma Caluag

Vice Mayor of San Fernando, Pampanga
- In office June 30, 2004 – June 30, 2013
- Mayor: Oscar Rodriguez
- Preceded by: Tiger Lagman
- Succeeded by: Jaime Lazatin

Member of the San Fernando, Pampanga Municipal Council
- In office 1988 – June 30, 1998

Personal details
- Born: Edwin David Santiago; June 21, 1957 (age 69) San Fernando, Pampanga, Philippines
- Party: KAMBILAN (2018–present)
- Other political affiliations: Liberal (2009–2018); Lakas (until 2009)
- Spouse: Ma. Luisa Manalansan Baltazar
- Children: 2
- Education: Mapúa Institute of Technology
- Occupation: Mechanical engineer, Politician

Edwin "EDSA" David Santiago (born June 21, 1957), also known by his initials EDSA, is a Filipino politician and mechanical engineer who served as the mayor of City of San Fernando, Pampanga from 2013 until 2022. He previously served as Vice Mayor under Oscar Rodriguez from 2004 until 2013, and Councilor from 1988 until 1998.

On May 27, 2023, Santiago launched his project, Paskuhan Village's City of San Fernando Giant Lantern and Tourist Information Center as testament to Kapampangan heritage and realization of SFP as Home of the Giant Lanterns.

== Controversies ==
On June 19, 2020, former Barangay Dolores chairman Melchor Caluag filed a complaint against Santiago for graft charges for overpriced goods.

== Personal life ==
Edwin Santiago is the son of Benjamin Naluz Santiago and Florencia Yusi David. He is married to Ma. Luisa Manalansan Baltazar, and they have two children: Pamela and Kristine.
