= Nicknames of Iloilo City =

Slang terms for Iloilo City, Philippines

Iloilo City, the largest city in Western Visayas, has acquired numerous nicknames and titles throughout its history. Similar to Manila, the capital of the Philippines, the city is associated with several historical and contemporary nicknames. While it is widely known today as the "City of Love," it was historically recognized as the "Queen City of the South." Its Spanish royal title, La Muy Leal y Noble Ciudad de Iloílo, or "The Most Loyal and Noble City of Iloilo," is commemorated on its official seal.

Iloilo City is often shortened to I.C. (or IC), Ill City (popularized by a local clothing brand), Lilo (mostly used by younger generations), or ILO (the IATA code for Iloilo International Airport). Iloilo is also sometimes informally spelled as Ilo-Ilo, mostly by non-Ilonggos.

== Nicknames ==
- Most Loyal and Noble City (Spanish: La Muy Leal y Noble Ciudad) - The royal title was granted by Queen Regent Maria Christina of Austria on March 1, 1898, in recognition of the city's loyalty to the Spanish Crown during the Philippine Revolution. The title appears on the city's official seal and coat of arms.
- Queen City of the South (Spanish: La Reina Ciudad del Sur) - A historical title associated with Iloilo's commercial prominence during the late 19th century. Following the opening of its port to international trade in 1855 and the royal designation of 1889, Iloilo emerged as one of the leading commercial centers in the Philippines, second only to Manila in economic importance. The title became associated with the city's prosperity during the Spanish colonial period and was later adopted by other cities, including Cebu City.
- Textile Capital of the Philippines (Spanish: Capital Textil de Filipinas) - A historical designation dating back to the late 18th century, when Iloilo became the country's leading center of textile production and trade. Its weaving industry produced fabrics such as piña, jusi, sinamay, and cotton textiles, which were sold in Manila and overseas markets. The industry contributed significantly to the city's economy before the expansion of the sugar trade.
- City of Love (Hiligaynon: Siyudad sang Paghigugma) - Documented by 2004, the nickname refers to the hospitality and friendliness commonly associated with Iloilo's residents, as well as the gentle and melodic character often attributed to the Ilonggo accent. It has since become one of the city's most widely used tourism identities.
- Heart of the Philippines - A geographical and tourism-related designation referring to Iloilo's location in the central Philippines. The expression is also used to describe Iloilo Province and is not exclusive to the city.
- City of Many Firsts - Associated with a compilation of the city's pioneering achievements by journalist Norberto Baylen of the Visayan Tribune during the 1970s. Iloilo's historical milestones include the early introduction of commercial, educational, transportation, and public utility services outside Manila. These include railway, telephone, telegraph, and electricity services, as well as early commercial airline operations.
- City of Mansions - Documented by 2018, the nickname refers to the city's numerous ancestral houses and heritage mansions built by prominent families during the Spanish and American colonial periods. Many were constructed during the city's economic boom, particularly when the sugar industry brought wealth to local landowning and business families.
- Museum City - Also known as the Emerging Museum City of the Philippines, the designation was documented by 2018 in recognition of the city's museums, cultural institutions, heritage houses, and historical landmarks.
- Bike Capital of the Philippines - In use by 2020 and formally branded by the Iloilo City Meetings, Incentives, Conventions and Events Center on July 31, 2022. The designation refers to the city's investments in cycling infrastructure, including its bicycle lane network and initiatives promoting cycling as an alternative mode of transportation.
- Creative City of Gastronomy - Designated by UNESCO in 2023 as part of the Creative Cities Network, Iloilo City became the first Philippine city to receive the recognition in the field of gastronomy. The designation recognizes the city's culinary traditions, local food culture, and efforts to preserve and promote its food heritage.

== See also ==
- List of city and municipality nicknames in the Philippines
