= List of province nicknames in the Philippines =

This partial list of province nicknames in the Philippines compiles the aliases, sobriquets and slogans that provinces in the Philippines are known by (or have been known by historically), officially and unofficially, to municipal governments, local people, outsiders or their tourism boards or chambers of commerce.

Current official nicknames are highlighted in bold.

== List ==
Province	Region	Nickname(s)	Notes
Benguet	Cordillera Administrative Region	Salad Bowl of the Philippines	After the province vegetable cultivation industry. Nickname also applies to the town of La Trinidad.
Camiguin	Northern Mindanao	Island Born of Fire	Due to the island province's volcanic origin.
Cebu	Central Visayas	The Gateway to a Thousand Journeys	Due to its wonderful history dating back to the pre-colonial era. Notable ones is the Battle of Mactan.
Davao del Norte	Davao Region	Banana Capital of the Philippines	After the province's banana industry, accounting for a third of the Philippines' total banana production as of 2018.
Masbate	Bicol Region	Cattle Country of the Philippines	Due to the cattle-raising being a major part of the province's industry.
Masbate	Bicol Region	**Rodeo Capital of the Philippines**	Nickname officially given through Executive Order No. 120 issued by President Gloria Macapagal Arroyo in 2002. After the province's rodeo tradition which is an offshoot of the province's cattle-raising practice.
Negros Occidental	Negros Island Region	Sugar Bowl of the Philippines	After the province's sugarcane industry. The province accounts about 60 percent of the Philippines' sugar output as of 2020.

== See also ==
- List of city and municipality nicknames in the Philippines
- Lists of nicknames – nickname list articles on Wikipedia
