= Tourism Infrastructure and Enterprise Zone Authority =

Philippine government agency

- Pangasiwaan ng Turismo sa Sonang Impraestruktura at Negosyo (Filipino)

Corporation overview
- Formed: July 28, 2009
- Preceding Corporation: Philippine Tourism Authority
- Headquarters: Pasay, Metro Manila
- Corporation executive: Mark Lapid, Chief Operating Officer
- Parent Corporation: Department of Tourism
- Website: www.tieza.gov.ph

The Tourism Infrastructure and Enterprise Zone Authority (TIEZA; Filipino: Pangasiwaan ng Turismo sa Sonang Impraestruktura at Negosyo), formerly the Philippine Tourism Authority (Filipino: Pangasiwaang Pilipino sa Turismo), is an agency of the Philippine national government under the Department of Tourism responsible for implementing policies and programs of the department pertaining to the development, promotion, and supervision of tourism projects in the Philippines.

Republic Act No. 9593 or "The Tourism Act of 2009" declares a national policy for tourism as an engine of investment, employment, growth and national development, and strengthening the Department of Tourism and its attached agencies to effectively and efficiently implement that policy, and appropriating fund thereof.

The Act supports the establishment of Tourism Enterprise Zones (TEZs) established to be the centers of tourism development in the country. TIEZA is mandated to designate, regulate and supervise the TEZs established under this Act, as well as develop, manage and supervise tourism infrastructure projects in the country.

The TIEZA is governed a board of directors (TIEZA Board) composed of Tourism Department Secretary, the TIEZA Chief Operating Officer, the Tourism Promotion Board Chief Operating Officer, the Department of Public Work and Highways Secretary, the Department of Environmental and Natural Resources Secretary, the Department of Internal and Local Government Secretary, and five representative directors that will be recommended by the Tourism Congress.

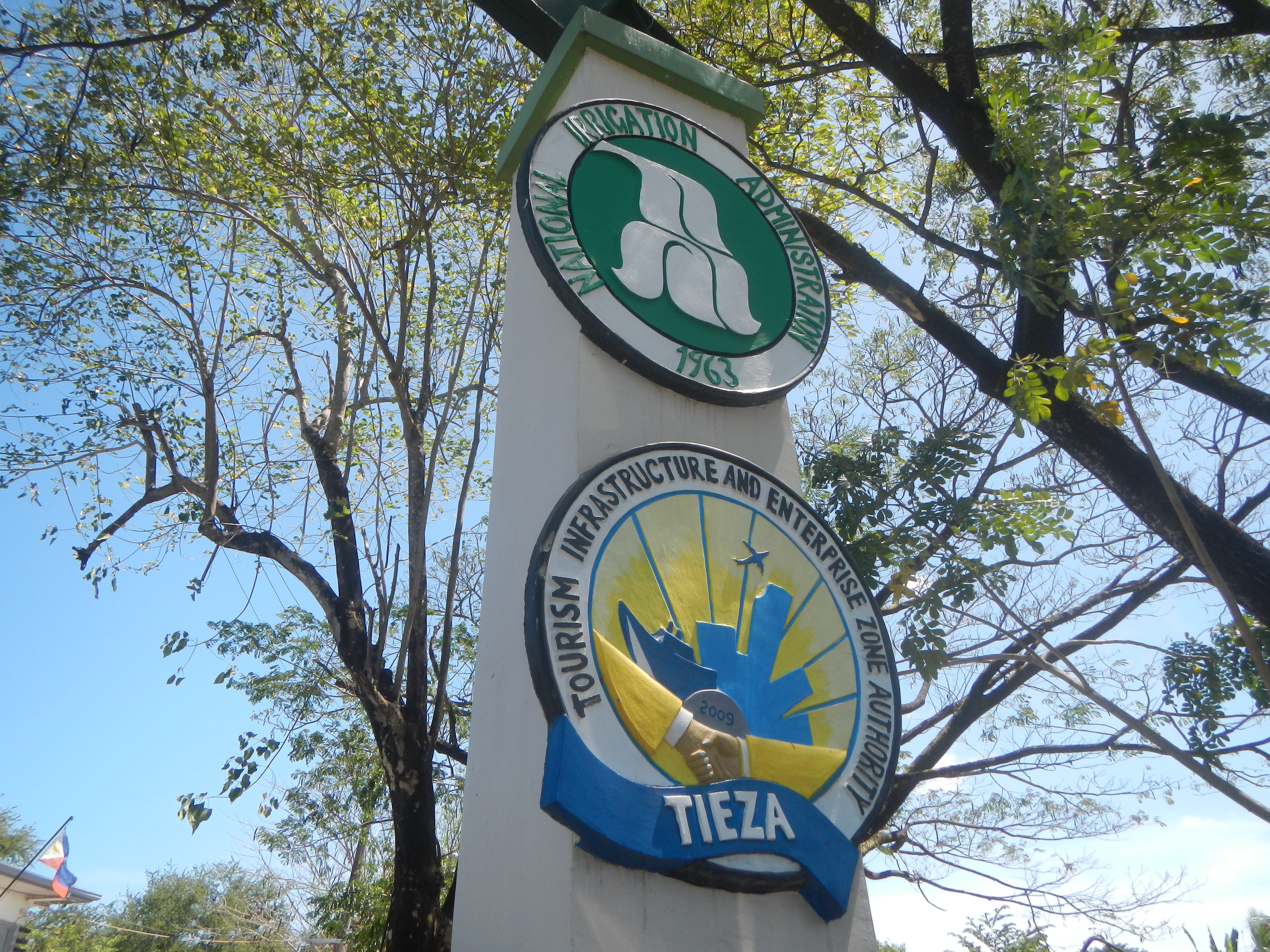
TIEZA (Bustos Dam)

As the infrastructure arm of DOT, TIEZA has been managing and operating several establishments. Among those operational are:

- Banaue Hotel and Youth Hostel
- Bustos Dam Eco Park
- Hilaga Northern Philippines Village (or Paskuhan Village)
- Club Intramuros Golf Course
- Rizal Lights and Sounds Museum
- Balicasag Island Dive Resort
- Gardens of Malasag Mountain Resort
- Zamboanga Golf Course and Beach Park
- Boracay Water Drainage Program
- Corregidor Island breakwater reconstruction

TIEZA derives 50% of the share of travel taxes collected in the Philippines. Due to the COVID-19 pandemic in the Philippines, the agency experienced reduced collection when compared to the pre-pandemic year of 2019.
