= Nicknames of Manila =

Slang terms for the capital city of the Philippines

Manila, the capital city of the Philippines, is known by a number of nicknames, aliases, sobriquets and slogans, both officially and unofficially, now and in the past.

The city is most popularly referred to as the Pearl of the Orient. This nickname appears in the lyrics of the city's official hymn and is also depicted in the city's coat of arms.

Manila is also frequently shortened to Mla or MNL (the IATA code for Ninoy Aquino International Airport).

== Nicknames ==
- Pearl of the Orient (Spanish: Perla del Oriente), first used in 1751 by Jesuit historian Juan Delgado in reference to the city's rich trade history even prior to the Manila-Acapulco Galleon era. It was made popular by José Rizal who gave the name Pearl of the Orient Seas (Spanish: Perla del Mar de Oriente) to his nativeland on the eve of his execution in 1896. It is then sometimes used to describe all of the Philippines.
- Distinguished and Ever Loyal City (Spanish: Insigne y Siempre Leal Ciudad), the royal title granted to the city by King Philip II in 1574 which also appeared in the original coat of arms of Manila.
- Venice of the Orient (Spanish: Venecia del Oriente), in reference to the city's low-lying ground intersected with many picturesque canals, particularly in the area of Binondo. It was made popular in the late 19th century by several authors including Graciano López Jaena.
- Rome of the East (Spanish: Roma del Oriente), also the City of Churches, particularly in reference to the walled city of Intramuros which, prior to World War II, contained several convents and churches of six major religious orders. Spanish Manila served as the center for missionaries for the whole of Asia and Oceania.
- City of the Sun (Spanish: Ciudad del Sol), coined by the Spanish poet Salvador Rueda during his visit to Manila in 1915.
- Havana of the Orient, in reference to the city's large tobacco export industry in the early 1900s.
- Queen City of the Pacific, from the 1938 documentary film Manila: Queen City of the Pacific written by American filmmaker André de la Varre.
- City of Our Affections, first used by national artist Nick Joaquin in 1950 in his literary play A Portrait of the Artist as Filipino.
- Imperial Manila, referring to the city's status as the Philippines' primate city and the nation's capital since the days of the Spanish empire.
- America's First Chinatown, in reference to Spanish Manila's (and eventually American Manila's) Binondo, the world's oldest Chinatown.
- City of Man, a nickname given to the city by Imelda Marcos in the 1970s which was also the name of her tourism and infrastructure development campaign for the city as governor of Metro Manila.
- Handsome Metropolis (Filipino: Metro Gwapo), coined by former Metropolitan Manila Development Authority chairman Bayani Fernando in 2006 as a campaign slogan for the redevelopment of the Manila metropolitan area.
- Capital of Fun, a recent nickname and tourism slogan coined by the Department of Tourism in 2014.
- Paris of Asia (or Paris of the East), a moniker given to Manila by Australian travel guide publisher Lonely Planet in 2015.

== See also ==
- List of city and municipality nicknames in the Philippines
