= Parol =

Filipino ornamental Christmas lantern

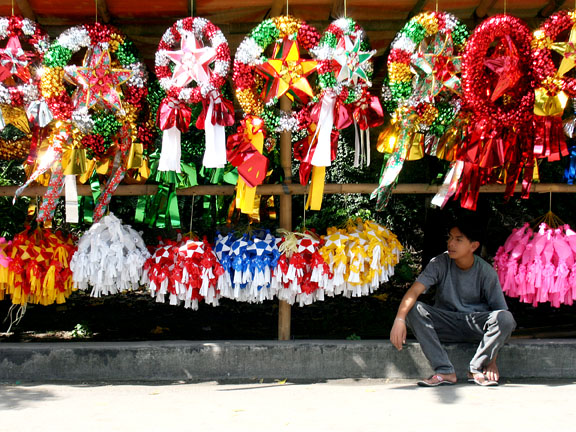
A vendor's stall with various parol designs

A parol (pronounced [paˈɾol], US: /pɑːˈroʊl/, also written as paról or parul, from Spanish farol, meaning lantern) is a Filipino ornamental lantern displayed during the Christmas season. Parols are traditionally constructed using bamboo and Japanese paper, and are illuminated with candles, oil lamps, or carbide lamps. Modern parols can be made using other materials such as plastic, metal, and capiz shells and are usually illuminated with electric lighting. Its most-common form is a five-pointed star, although it can come in various shapes and sizes. Large disc-shaped electronic versions of parols produced in Pampanga are known as "parul sampernandu", the phonetic spelling of parol San Fernando, owing to the city where these lanterns are a major product.

The parol is a traditional part of the Panunulúyan pageant in the nine-day Christmas Novena procession during the Spanish colonial period of the Philippines. It was initially rectangular or oblong in shape and was made with white paper, but eventually came to be made in various shapes and colors. It became standardized to a five-pointed star (symbolizing the Star of Bethlehem) during the American colonial period. It remains an iconic symbol of Filipino Christmas.

A Philippine Christmas lantern (known as a parol) with Christmas lights at night.

== History ==
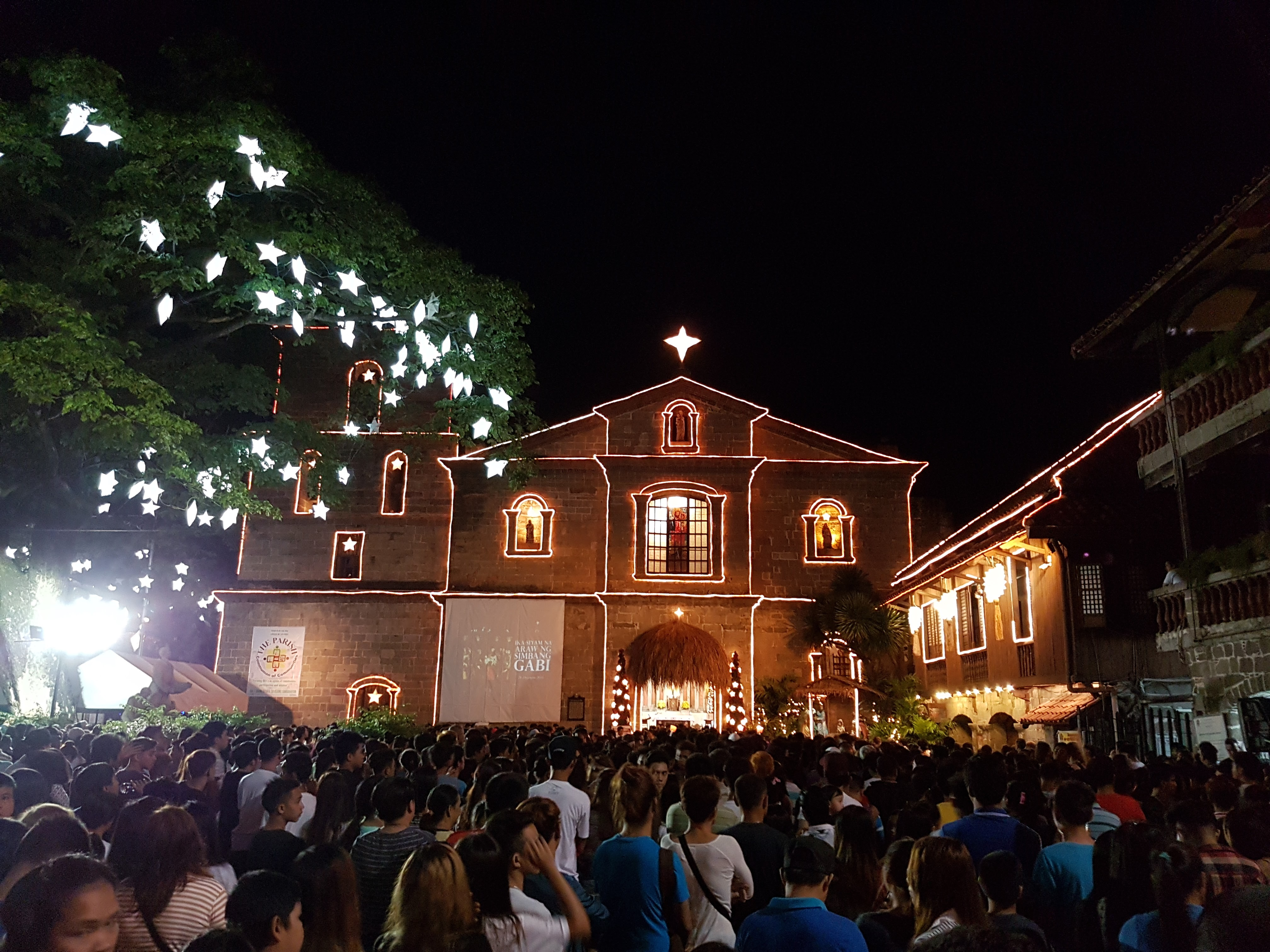
Parols illuminate the St. Joseph Parish Church in Las Piñas during Simbang Gabi.

Like in other parts of Southeast Asia, paper lanterns were introduced to the Philippines before the Spanish colonization of the Philippines. The word paról is the modern Filipino spelling of the original Spanish name farol, meaning "lantern". In the native languages, parol and lanterns in general are also known as paritaan.

The tradition of the parol becoming associated with Christmas dates back to the Spanish colonial period of the Philippines. It is a local adaptation of the Hispanic tradition of carrying small light sources (like torches, candles, or braziers) during the nine-day Christmas Novena procession leading up to the midnight mass (called Simbang Gabi in the Philippines).

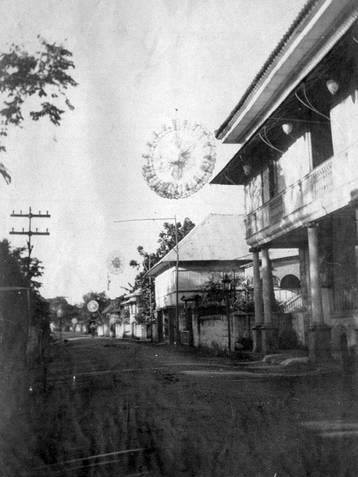
Six-pointed parols in San Fernando, Pampanga in 1904 from the Luther Parker Collection, National Library of the Philippines.

They are particularly associated with the Panunulúyan pageant accompanying the procession, which is a reenactment of the search for lodgings by Joseph and the pregnant Virgin Mary in Bethlehem. The actors portraying Joseph and Mary, as well as the townspeople, carried paper lanterns made with bamboo and Japanese paper (papel de japón). After the procession, these lanterns were then hung outside houses as decorations. Over time, they became an indispensable part of Filipino Christmas tradition.

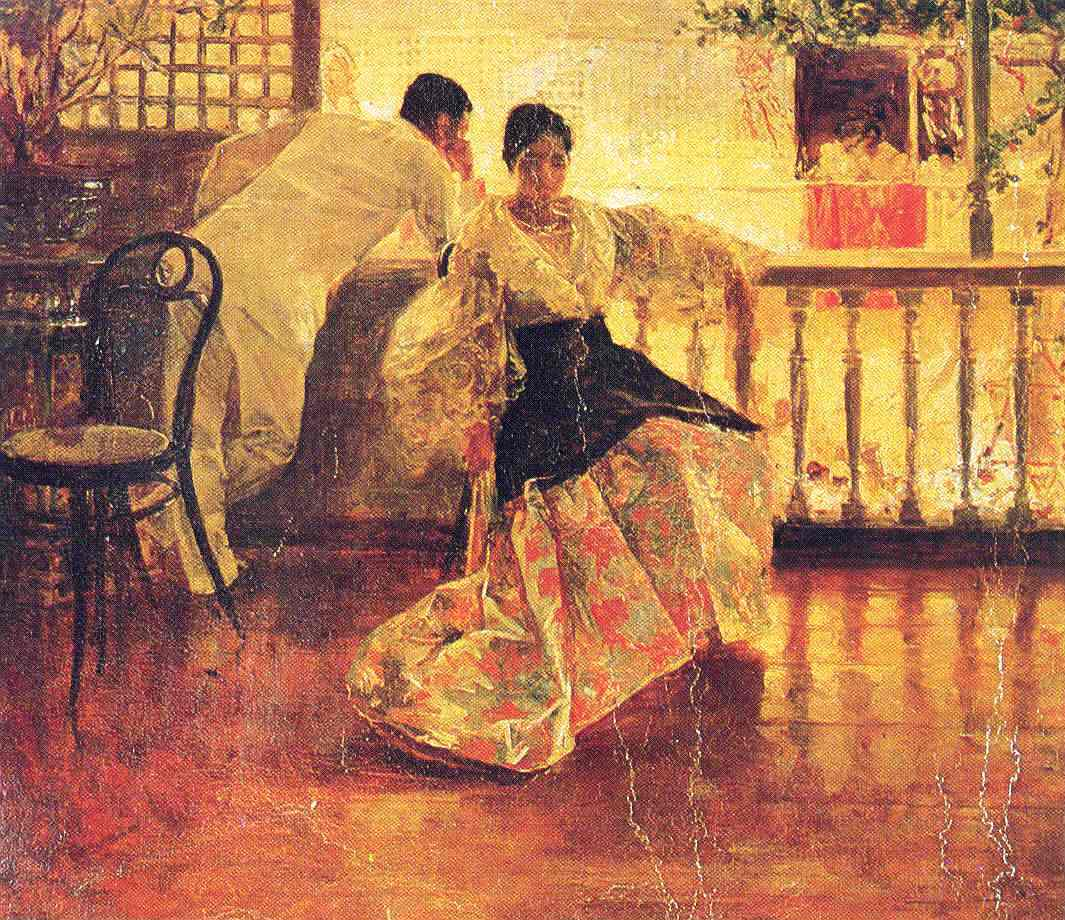
What appears to be six-pointed paróls are visible in the background of the painting Tampuhan (1895) by Juan Luna

Early Spanish-era parols were initially simple rectangular or oblong shapes and were made with white paper. They were illuminated by candles or coconut oil lamps. Their shapes and colors became more diverse by the 1830s, including intricate designs made with folded papercutting. The lanterns were all made by hand, and thus the designs varied by household.

In the traditional Lubenas processions of Pampanga which dates back to the 1800s, the shapes and locations of the parols used have become standardized. They feature a cross-shaped parol at the head of the procession representing Jesus, followed by a fish-shaped parol with hinged jaws (called the asan) representing Ichthys. Behind them are the carroza (wheeled carriage) or the andas (shoulder-borne palanquin) which carry religious images. The carriages are flanked by two rows of six, star-shaped parols (usually having more than five points) for a total of twelve; each lantern represents one of the twelve apostles. Behind the carriage is a giant intricately designed lantern (which is the origin of the Giant Lantern Festival). This giant lantern can take any form. In 1933, the giant lantern of Bgy. Del Pilar was reputedly built in the image of King Kong. This was followed by a choir and a band singing various versions of "Dios Te Salve" (local adaptations of "Ave Maria" with Spanish lyrics).

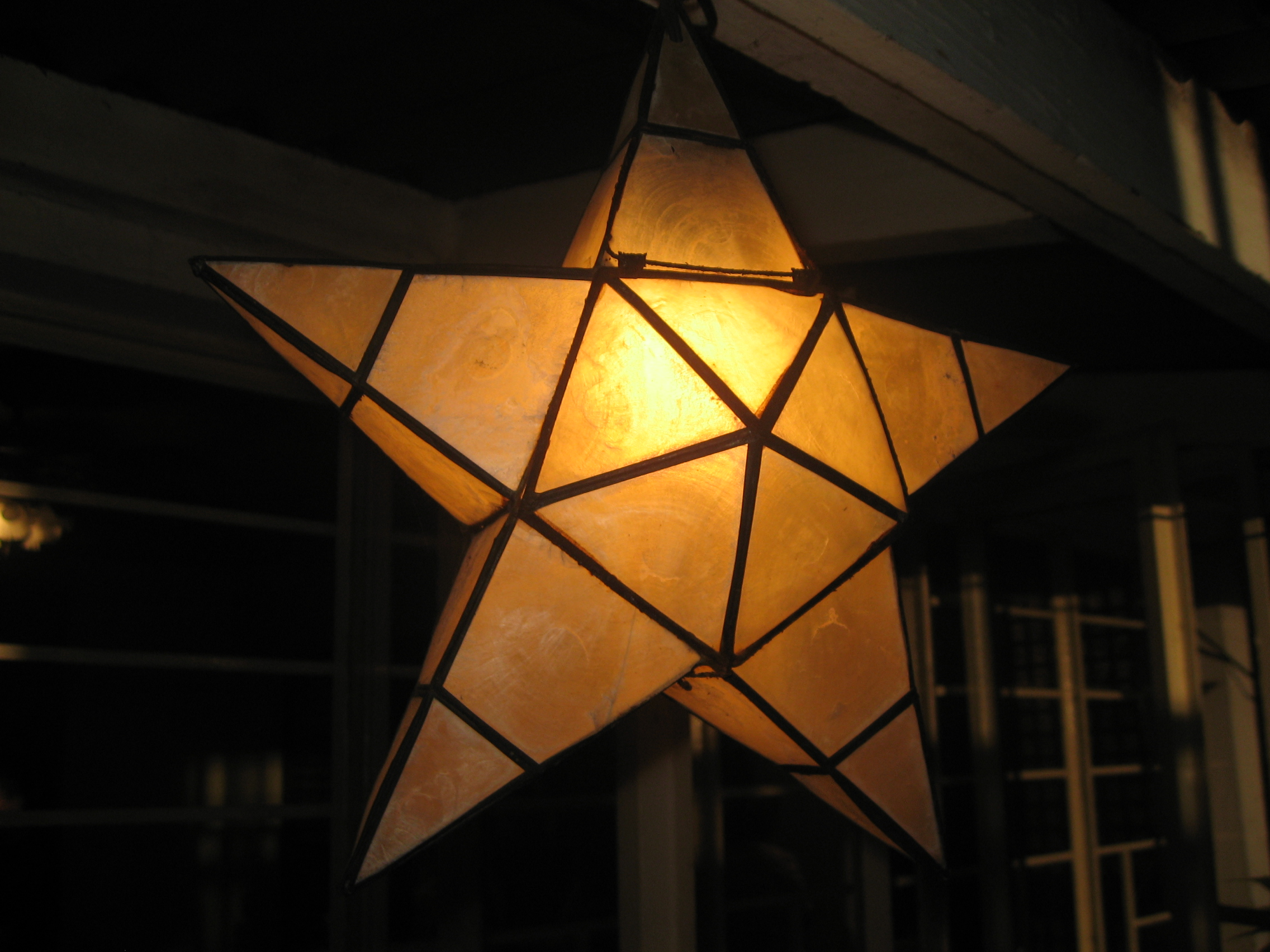
A simple star-shaped parol made of capiz shells

In the past, aside from the fish, parols shaped like a lamb (representing the Lamb of God), a dove (representing the Holy Spirit), and animals from the nativity scene were also carried, along with angel-shaped parols. But they are rarely featured today. All of the parols featured in the Lubenas are traditionally predominantly white, but other colors are used today for trimmings. The Lubenas was a vanishing tradition only practiced by around seven towns by the year 2000, but after recent efforts to revive it, there are more towns holding a Lubenas procession each year.

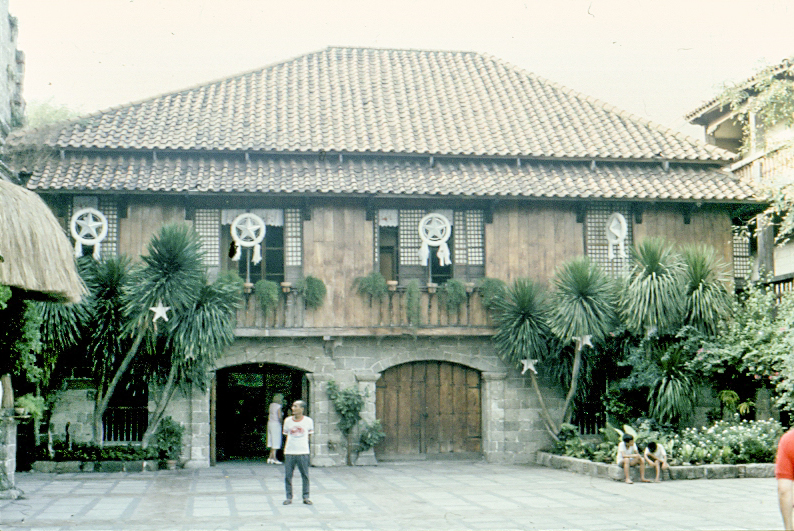
Parols displayed on the windows of a traditional Filipino house (bahay na bato) in 1982

The paról did not acquire its standard five-pointed star shape until the American colonial period. Based on oral accounts, an artisan from Pampanga named Francisco Estanislao allegedly crafted the first five-pointed star-shaped paról in 1908. His creation was made of bamboo strips covered with Japanese paper, illuminated by a candle or kalburo (carbide lamp).

The first battery-operated parols with incandescent bulbs were produced in the 1940s. In 1957, parols with rotor systems were invented by the lantern-maker Rodolfo David. The parol was used for the year's entry of Barangay Santa Lucia in the Giant Lantern Festival of San Fernando, Pampanga, which they subsequently won from 1957 to 1959. His parol used rotating steel drums with wires on hairpins to program the light and music. This became the template for commercial electric parols called Parul Sampernandu sold from 1964 onward.

The farolitos (or luminarias) of New Mexico, which are paper lanterns that have the same function during the Las Posadas, are derived from the Filipino parol via the Manila galleons.

== Construction and design ==
Parols with programmed LED lights

Traditionally, parols have a framework made of bamboo sticks which are then covered by coloured pieces of either Japanese paper or crêpe paper. The most common form is a five-pointed star with two decorative "tails".

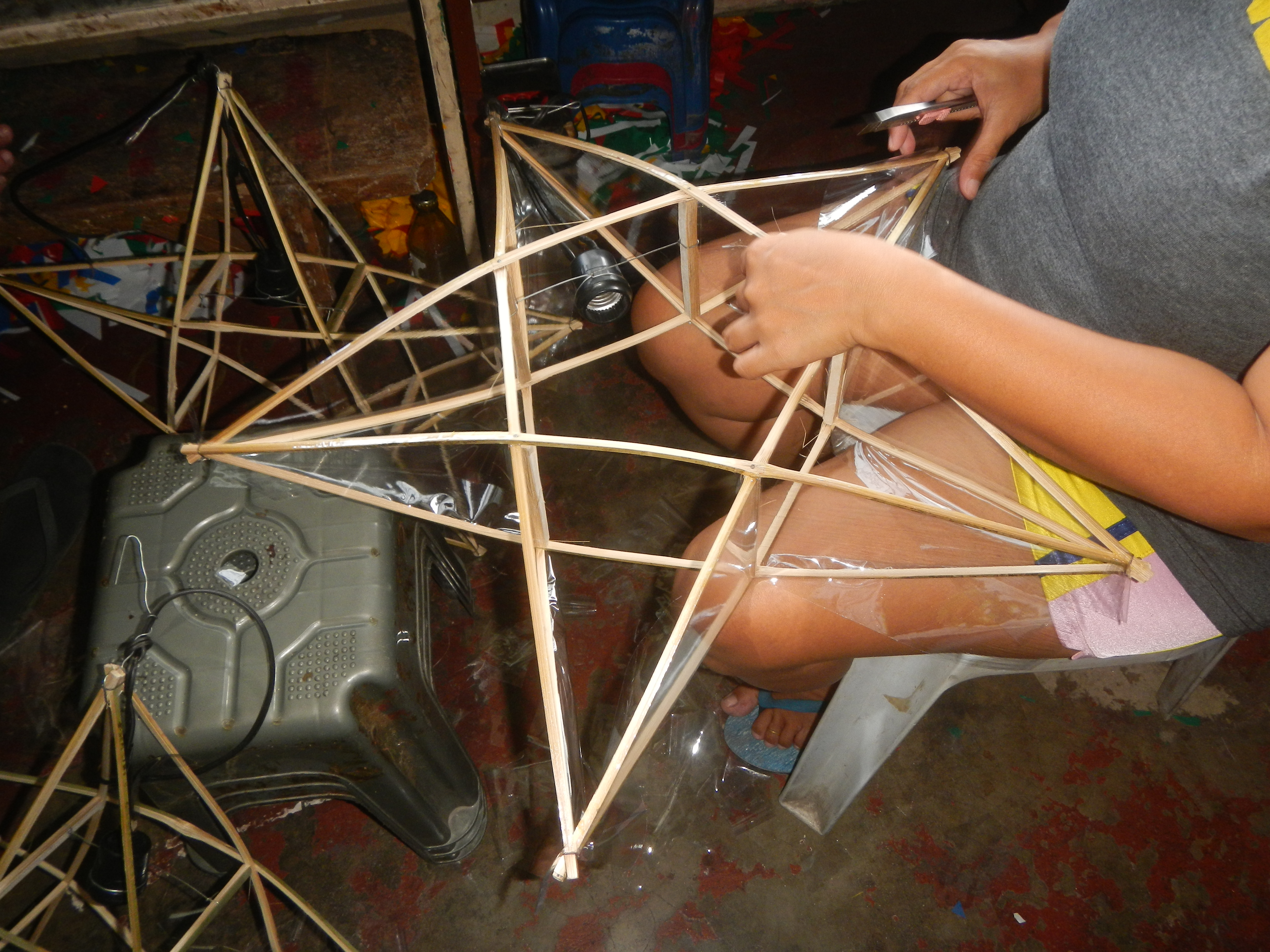
Building the frame of a traditional parol with bamboo sticks

Nowadays, the materials range from plastic, shells, glass, beads, foil, feathers, hemp, leaves, seeds, plastic straws, wood and even metal. They usually come in various sizes, from small, tinsel and foil lanterns to gigantic ones that are electrically lit at night, and may have one, three or more tails aside from the ubiquitous two. Some have a surrounding "halo," and the number of points on the star usually ranges from four to around ten (however, higher numbers exist). As for stellate patterns, more complex shapes that are seen are the rose, the bromeliad or pineapple, the snowflake and the sea urchin.

Other designs aside from the common stellate pattern include those of angels, huge flowers, Santa Claus's face, reindeer, happy faces, and Christmas trees, among other Western holiday symbols.

The lantern-makers of Pampanga have their own long-standing tradition on parol design. The Kapampangan parol has four concentric layers. The central circular part is known as the tambor or tambur ("drum"). This is followed by the siku-siku ("elbow"), which contains the criss-crossing star shapes. The third layer is the palimbun (from the Kapampangan word limbun, meaning a Novena procession), a circular rim that surrounds the siku-siku. The last layer is the puntetas ("edges" or "tips") which contain smaller intricate details. Pampanga is also the origin of the first electric and battery-operated parols with automated rotor systems, known as parul sampernandu, which date back to the 1940s to 1960s.

Recently, innovations from Pampanga include production of lanterns with electronic lights that can be programmed to produce a dancing effect, as is the use of LED rope lights, known as "flexilight" lanterns. In 2024, San Fernando, Pampanga, in its vision of sustainability launched its first all-LED rotors operated giant lantern using Firefly Electric and Lighting Corporation lights.

The original stellate design of the parol remains common in the Philippines and considered distinct for Filipinos. The traditional craft of lantern-making is usually taught to schoolchildren around Christmastime, but actual manufacture is now primarily done in the barrios and the poblacions and is rarely done in urban areas. A notable exception is San Fernando, Pampanga, which is considered "Home of the Giant Lanterns" for its million-peso lantern-making industry, as well as Las Piñas, a city in Metro Manila, where a lot of parols also originate.

== Use ==
=== In the Philippines ===
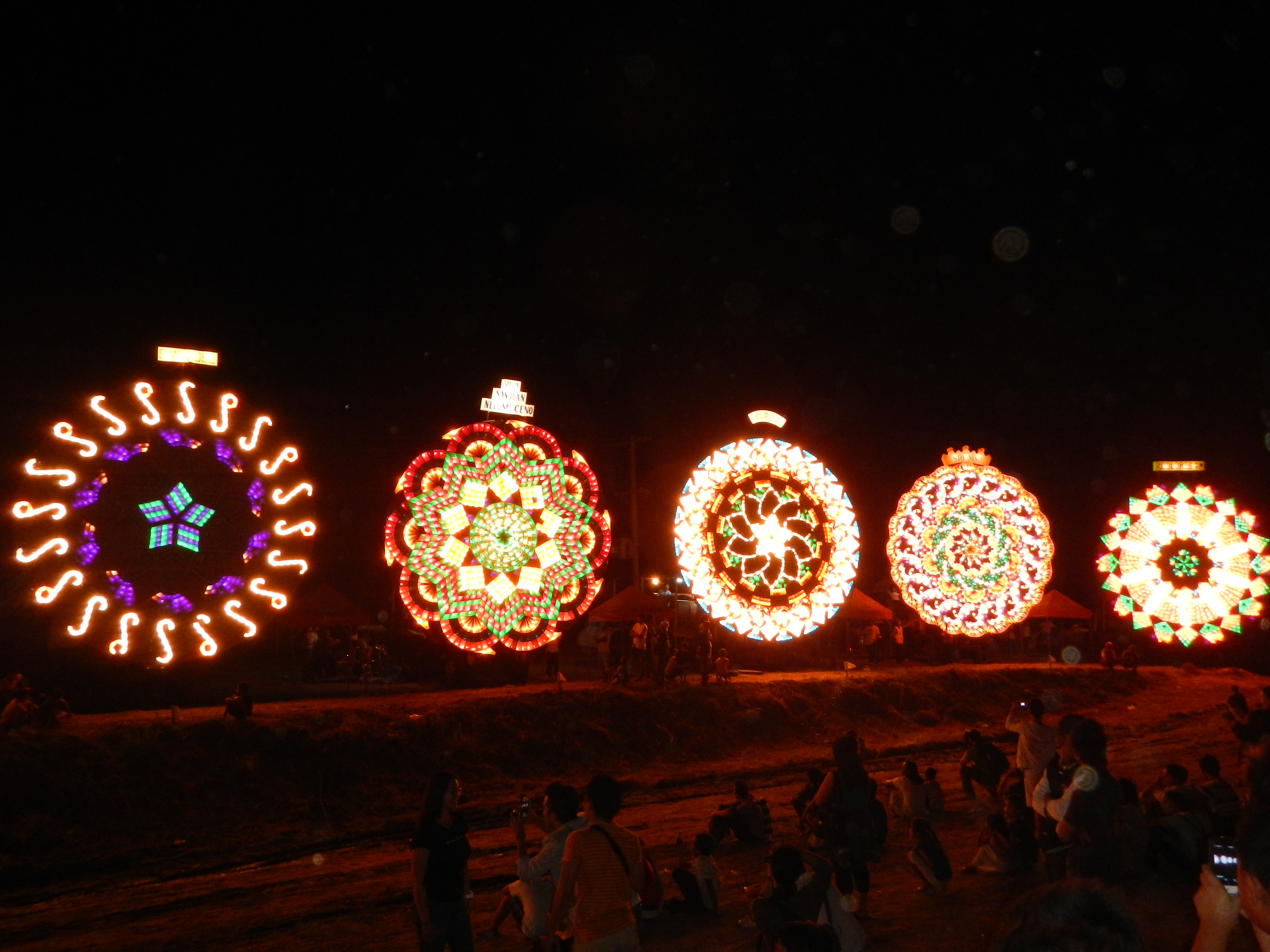
Entries in the 2012 Giant Lantern Festival in San Fernando, Pampanga

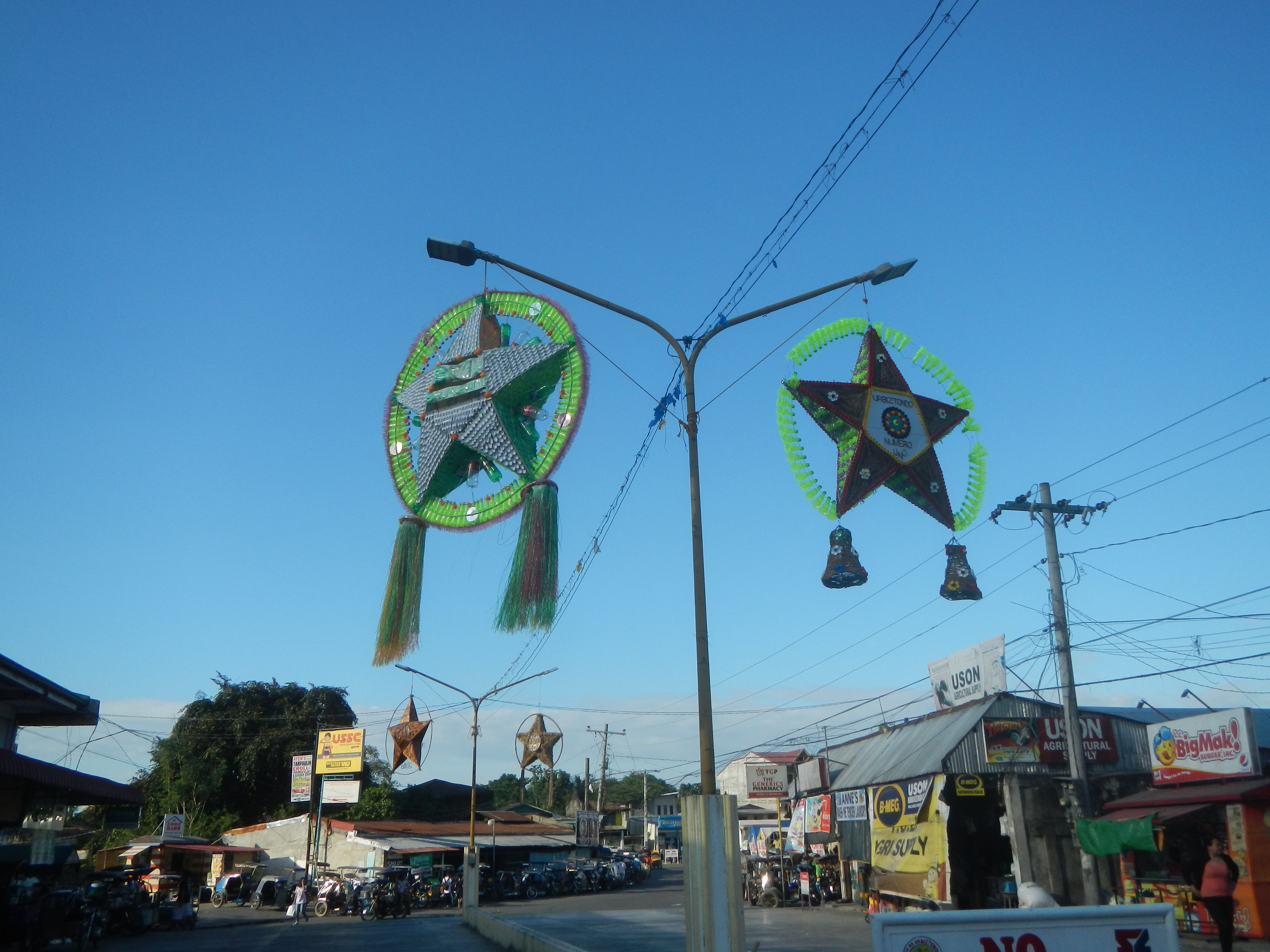
Parols hanging from lamp posts in Urbiztondo, Pangasinan

In the Philippines, the parol has become an iconic symbol of the Filipino Christmas and is as important to Filipinos as the Christmas tree is to Western cultures. Its annual debut on houses and streets is usually in September along with other Christmas symbols, signalling the coming of the season. The parol also retains its original association with the Simbang Gabi ritual, a series of dawn masses that lasts for nine days. These lanterns remain until January, traditionally removed after Epiphany, to honour the Three Kings and their visit to the infant Jesus.

Many communities, such as villages, schools, and groups hold competitions to see who can make the best parol. One such event is the annual Giant Lantern Festival in Pampanga, which attracts various craftsmen from across the archipelago. The competition revolves around the illumination and performances of giant parol that can reach up to 40 feet (12 m) in breadth. These giant lanterns are programmed to "dance" to the accompaniment of a brass band or recorded music.

=== Overseas ===
Although the use of the parol as a Christmas decoration is chiefly done in the Philippines, other countries where the Filipino diaspora have settled have also adapted its use. In Austria, the lanterns are a big attraction in the annual Wiener Christkindlmarkt (Vienna Christmas market). A ceremonial lighting of 60 parol in a 'Philippine Tree' was done at the Wiener Rathausplatz. The project was a collaboration between the city's government and the Philippine Embassy in Vienna, which introduced the lanterns in 2006.

Since 2005, renowned artist, Fred DeAsis, offers free Parol Making Workshop to the Filipino community in the Chicago, Illinois area and adjacent states. Workshops were coordinated by public libraries, community churches and local Filipino American cultural organizations. During the workshop, participants learn to make a traditional Filipino Christmas parol, originally designed by the artist, with the use of only 5 bamboo sticks, japanese paper, rubber bands, wire, glue and ornaments.

In San Francisco and Los Angeles, California, Filipino Americans celebrate an annual Parol Festival in December. Parols are also common as Christmas decorations for Filipino-American homes and churches. Filipinos in Canada hang parols in their party halls during Christmas parties to reminisce their traditional usage of the craft.

== See also ==
- Belén, another traditional Filipino symbol of Christmas
- Luminaria
- Windowpane oyster
- Las Posadas, a similar Novena tradition in Latin America
- Piñata, a similar but unrelated tradition in Mexico symbolizing the Star of Bethlehem
- Christmas lights
