= Giant Lantern Festival =

Annual festival in Pampanga, Philippines

Giant Lantern Festival/Ligligan Parul
- Some of the giant Christmas lanterns competing in the festival in 2023
- Official name: Ligligan Parul
- Also called: Giant Parols Festival
- Observed by: City of San Fernando, Pampanga
- Type: Cultural
- Significance: Celebrates the start of the Christmas season in the Philippines
- Observances: Holiday
- Begins: December 19, 2026
- Ends: January 1, 2027
- Date: In 3 months
- Frequency: Annual
- Related to: Christmas in the Philippines

The Giant Lantern Festival (Kapampangan: Ligligan Parul) is an annual festival held in mid-December in the City of San Fernando in the Philippines. The festival features a competition of giant parol lanterns. Because of the popularity of the festival, the city has been nicknamed the "Christmas Capital of the Philippines".

Central Luzon Television is the festival's official television partner since 2008.

== History ==
The San Fernando lantern industry evolved from the Giant Lantern Festival of San Fernando. The festival, which is held every December, finds its roots in Bacolor where a much simpler activity was held. Following the transfer of the provincial capital from Bacolor to San Fernando in August 1904, this lantern event followed as well. "Ligligan Parul" was said to have started in San Fernando in 1904. Others believe that the "Ligligan Parul" began in 1908.

This predecessor of the modern-day Giant Lantern Festival was actually a religious activity that we know today as “lubenas.” The lanterns measured just two feet in diameter, a far cry from the fifteen feet of the lanterns seen today in the festival. These were created in each barrio from bamboo and other locally available materials. During the nine-day novena before Christmas, which coincided with the simbang gabi from December 16 to 24, these paruls were brought around each barrio in procession to their visita. Before the midnight Mass on Christmas Eve, the lanterns were brought to the town church together with the barrio patrons.

This tradition gradually evolved as the lanterns became bigger and the designs became more intricate. Later, one big lantern was made for each barrio, which was created through a cooperative effort. Each resident contributed to its construction, from the concept and design to the materials and labor. In the end, these lanterns became a symbol of unity for the barrios.

It was in 1931 that electricity was introduced to the San Fernando lantern, thus sparking the birth of the first Giant Lantern Festival. The added illusion of dancing lights highlighted the bright colors and intricate designs of these Giant Lanterns. At this time, the lights were controlled by individual switches that were turned on and off following the beat of the music. The barangays of Del Pilar, Santa. Lucia and San Jose were among the first barangays to participate in the festival.

The first lantern festival was held to honor President Manuel L. Quezon. At that time, Quezon made Arayat his rest area and converted Mount Arayat into a tourist resort. As a show of gratitude to Quezon, the people of San Fernando held a Christmas lantern contest to honor the first family. Quezon himself donated the prize for his lantern contest, which was personally awarded to the winner by First Lady Aurora Aragon Quezon.

It was cancelled in 1978 and 1979 when Martial Law was declared. In the years that followed, more innovations were introduced to the giant lanterns. Colored plastics replaced traditional papel de hapon. The use of colored plastics will continue on until 2010, wherein fiberglass and handmade paper lanterns will make their first appearances.

Large steel barrels called rotors also substituted the hand-controlled switches to manipulate the lights. And lanterns have grown in size, approximately 20-feet today, and illuminated by about 3,500 to 5,000 light bulbs.

The festival was almost postponed in 1991 due to the cataclysmic Mount Pinatubo eruption.

From 1990 to 1998, the festival's venue was in Paskuhan Village. The festival was then held at the Bren Z. Guiao Convention Center in 1999. In 2000, the venue was moved again to SM City Pampanga until 2007. In 2008 up until present day, the venue is now at Robinsons Starmills. In 2011, Brgy. Calulut and Brgy. Del Carmen made their inaugural competition appearance. In 2015, Brgy's. Sindalan and Pandaras, also joined the competition for the first time.

On December 17, 2016, Brgy. Dolores achieved a grand slam champion after they won in three competitive years: 2014, 2015 and 2016. Followed by Brgy. Calulut and Brgy. Sindalan as 1st & 2nd runner up.

In 2017, the number of lights were limited to 10,000 light bulbs for each Giant Lantern participants.

On December 16, 2017, Brgy. Dolores won that year's competition for the fourth time. Followed by Brgy. San Jose & Brgy. Del Pilar as 1st & 2nd runners up. Also, Brgy. Del Rosario joined the competition for the first time.

In 2018, Brgy. Dolores did not participate that year after winning a hall-of-fame year previously. Also, 3 participating barangays returned for the competition: San Pedro, Sto. Nino & Del Carmen. And, for the first time in the history, a female-lead lantern maker from Brgy. San Jose competed in the festival.

On December 15, 2018, Brgy. Telabastagan won the competition after 5 years. Followed by Brgy. San Jose as first-runner up, Brgy. San Juan as second-runner up & Brgy. San Nicolas placed third-runner up.

On December 14, 2019, Brgy. Santa Lucia emerged as the winner of the competition, followed by Brgy. Calulut winning first runner-up, Brgy. Del Pilar as the 2nd runner-up, and Brgy. Sindalan getting the final position of 3rd runner-up. 12 barangays entered the competition that year making it its biggest celebration since 2006.

In 2020, the competition proper was canceled and instead presented as an exhibition due to the COVID-19 virus. This year, 7 barangays joined the festival. Only Brgy. Santa Lucia and Brgy. San Juan presented their new lantern design this year.

SMART gave prizes for the top 3 winners of #SmartxGLF2020 popularity award through social media. Out of 1350 votes, Brgy. San Juan, Brgy. Telabastagan, and Brgy. Santa. Lucia were the top three favorites, respectively.

In 2022, the Giant Lantern Festival competition returned, as well as the return of Brgy. Del Pilar, Dolores and Pandaras. On December 17, 2022, Brgy. San Juan emerged as the winner of the competition, marking their first championship. Brgy. Telabastagan and Brgy. Santa. Lucia hailed as 1st runner up and 2nd runner up.

The 2023 festival was held last December 16, also marking the comeback of Barangay San Jose into the festival's line-up since their last participation in 2019. Barangay Telabastagan won the first prize, followed by Barangays San Nicolas and San Juan winning the second and third prizes, respectively.

The 2024 festival required contestants to use at least 30% LED materials in their parols. Recently, San Fernando, Pampanga, in its vision of sustainability launched its first all-LED rotors operated giant lantern using Firefly Electric and Lighting Corporation lights.

In December 14, 2024, Brgy. San Nicolas emerged as the champion of the 2024 festival, a victorious comeback after 24 years. Brgy. Sto. Niño won the first runner up title, their first podium finish after 52 years. Brgy. Bulaon was hailed as the second runner up, making their very first podium finish in the festival. And Brgy. Telabastagan won the third runner up spot.

The 2025 competition marked the return of Brgy. Del Rosario in the festival after 8 years. Brgy. Telabastagan, however, took a short pause from competing in the same year. Brgy. Bulaon won their very first championship in the festival, followed by Brgy. Sto. Niño as first runner up, Brgy. Dolores as second runner up, and Brgy. Calulut as third runner up. Brgy. Calulut's lantern maker marked her debut historical, being the youngest in the edition as an 18-year old female lantern maker.

== Gallery ==
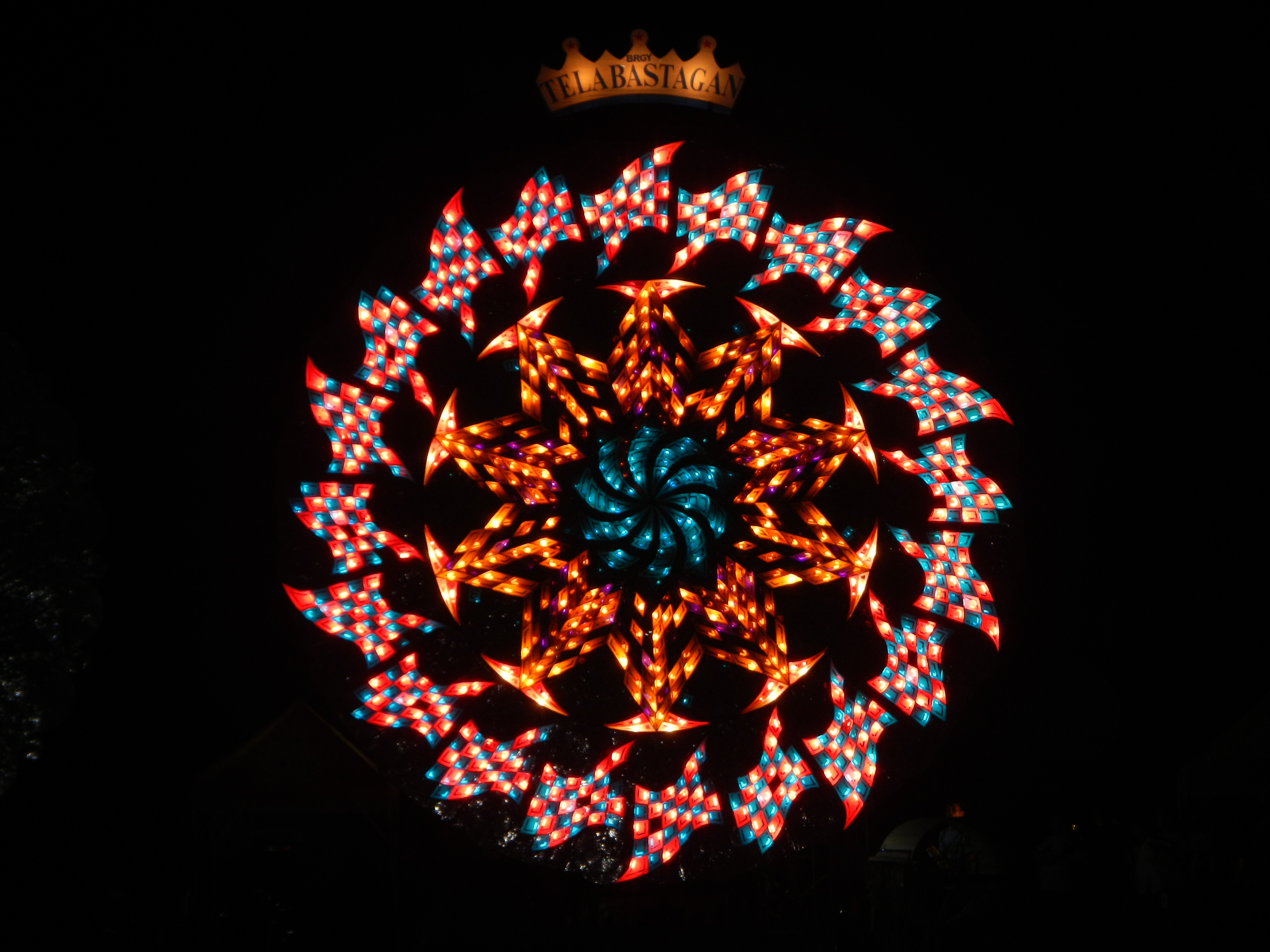
Barangay Telabastagan Entry (2012 Second Place Winner)

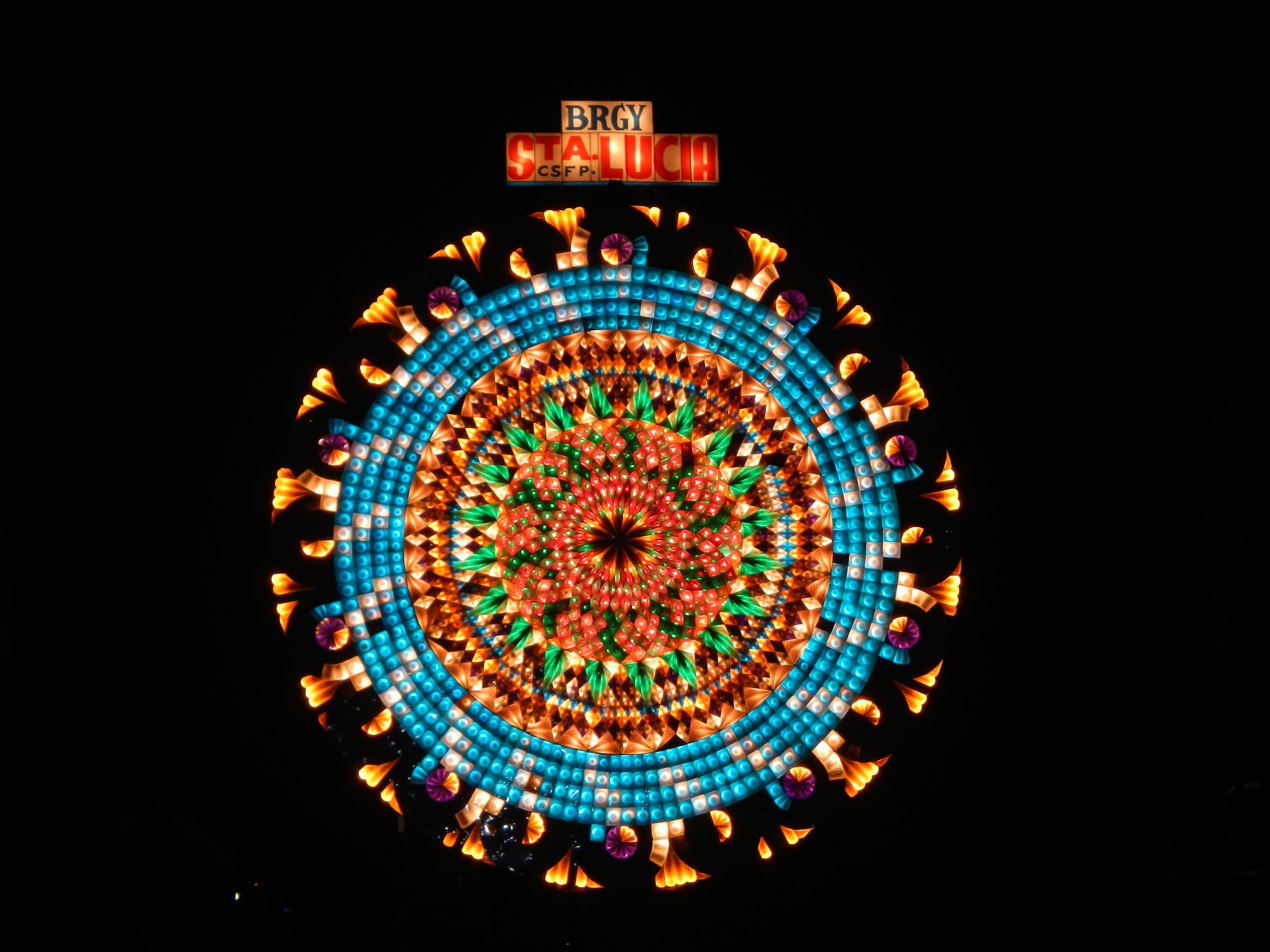
Barangay Santa Lucia Entry (2010 and 2011 Champion)

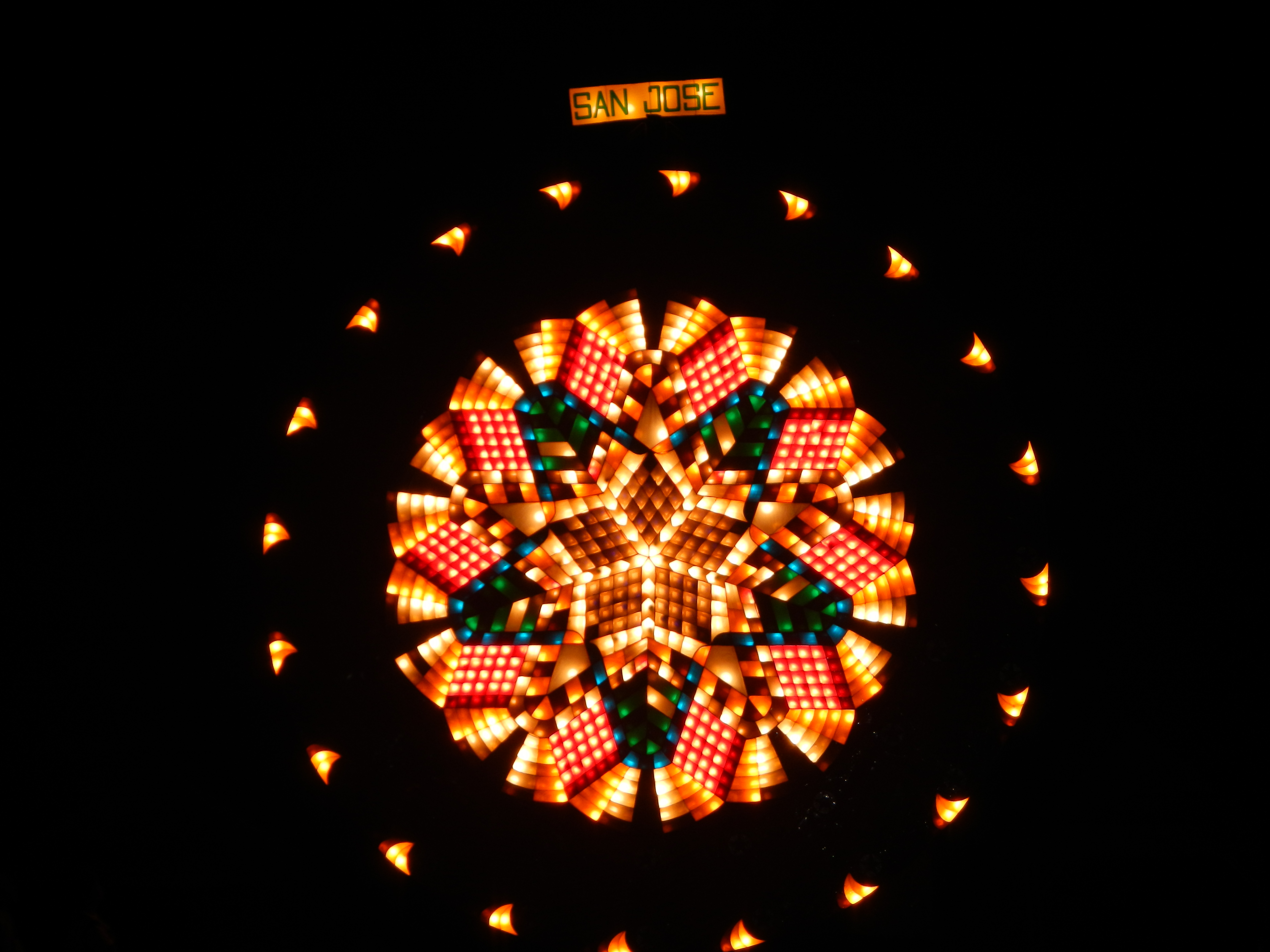
Barangay San Jose Entry (Second Place,2011 and Third Place, 2012)

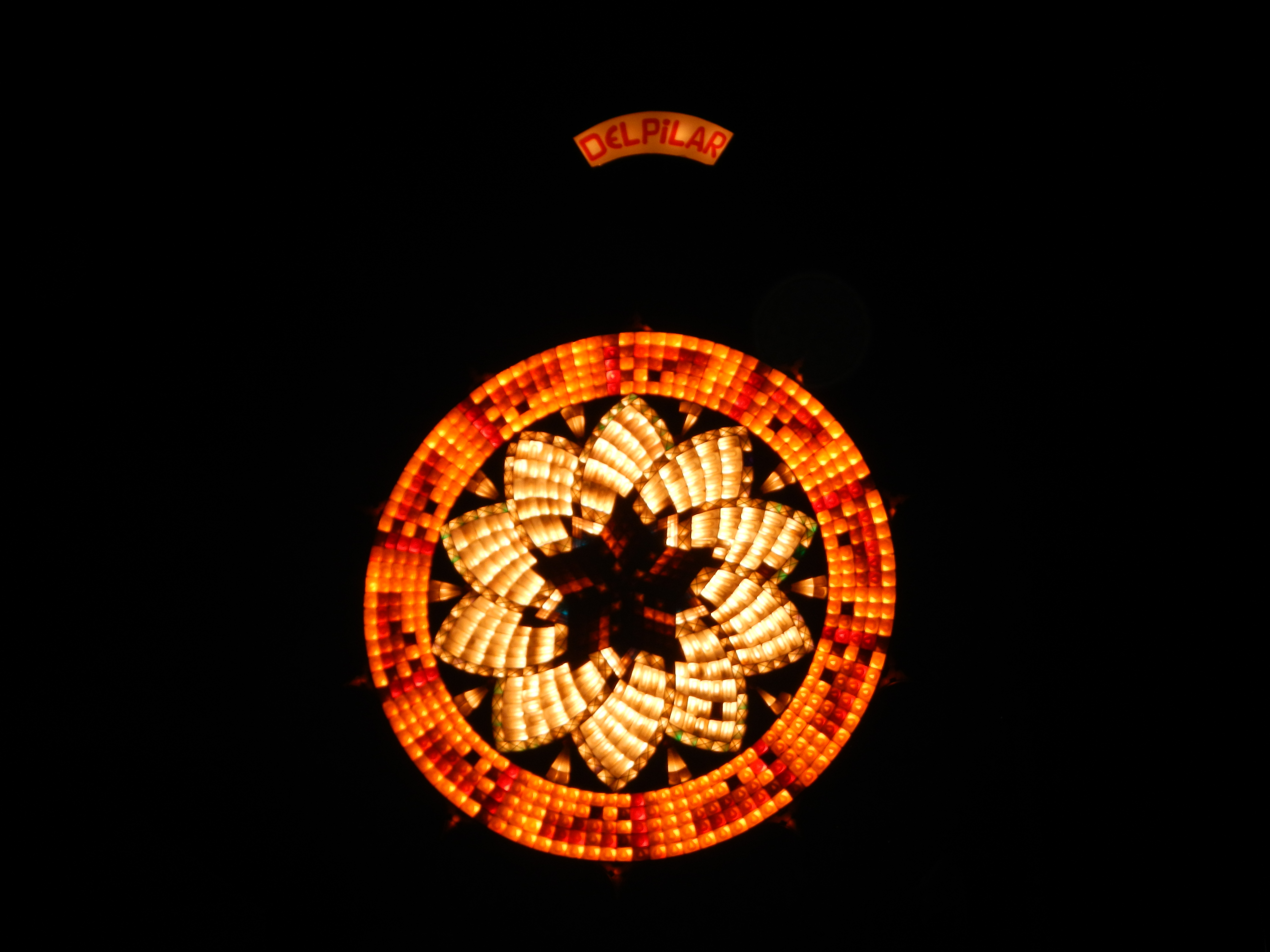
Barangay Del Pilar (2012 Grand Champion)

== In popular culture ==
In the 2019 show Where's Waldo? Wally and Wenda went to San Fernando, Pampanga.

The festival has been featured in various shows such as Biyahe ni Drew and Kapuso Mo, Jessica Soho.

== See also ==
- Christmas in the Philippines
- San Pedro Cutud Lenten Rites
- City of San Fernando, Pampanga

== Sources ==
- Video: 11 barangay, sumali sa taunang Giant Lantern Festival sa Pampanga
